= Ettrick, Wisconsin =

Ettrick is the name of two places in the U.S. state of Wisconsin:

- Ettrick (town), Wisconsin
- Ettrick (village), Wisconsin, located within the town of the same name
