= Butman =

Butman can refer to:

== People ==
- Igor Butman, jazz saxophonist
- John Butman (1951–2020), American writer
- Oleg Butman (born 1966), Russian jazz drummer
- Samuel Butman, American politician
- Shmuel Butman, Chabad rabbi

== Places in the United States ==
- Butman Corners, Wisconsin
- Butman Township, Michigan

== See also ==
- Buttman
- Buttmann
