= Franklin (community), Jackson County, Wisconsin =

Franklin, Wisconsin
- Unincorporated community
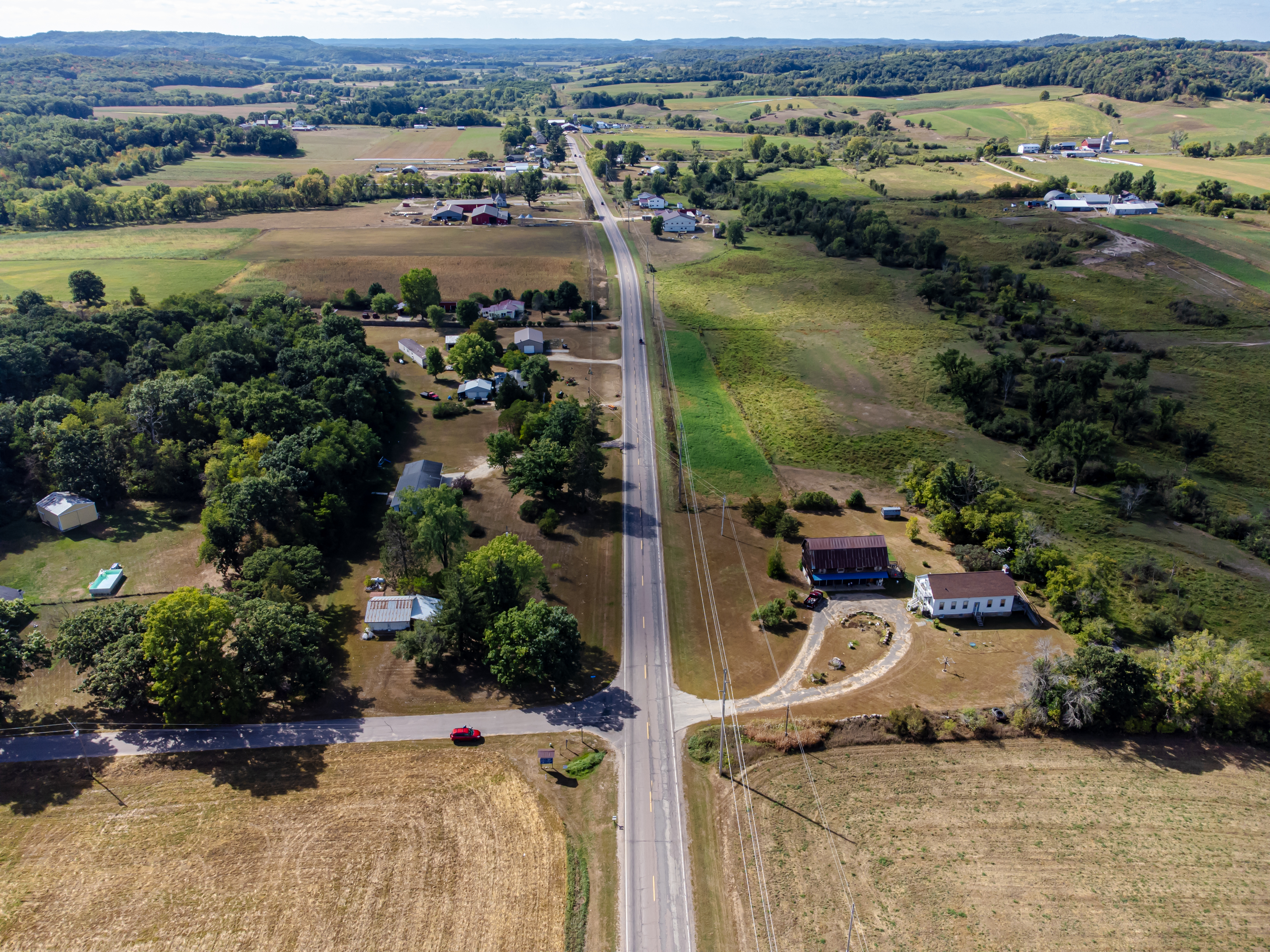
- Franklin (unincorporated community) in Jackson County, Wisconsin

- Location within Wisconsin Location within the United States
- Coordinates: 44°12′46″N 91°07′26″W
- Country: United States
- State: Wisconsin
- County: Jackson
- Town: Franklin
- Elevation: 886 ft (270 m)
- Time zone: UTC-6 (Central (CST))
  - Summer (DST): UTC-5 (CDT)
- Area codes: 715 & 534
- GNIS feature ID: 1565253

Franklin is an unincorporated community located in the town of Franklin, Jackson County, Wisconsin, United States. Franklin is located on County Highway C, 8 miles (13 km) east-northeast of Ettrick.

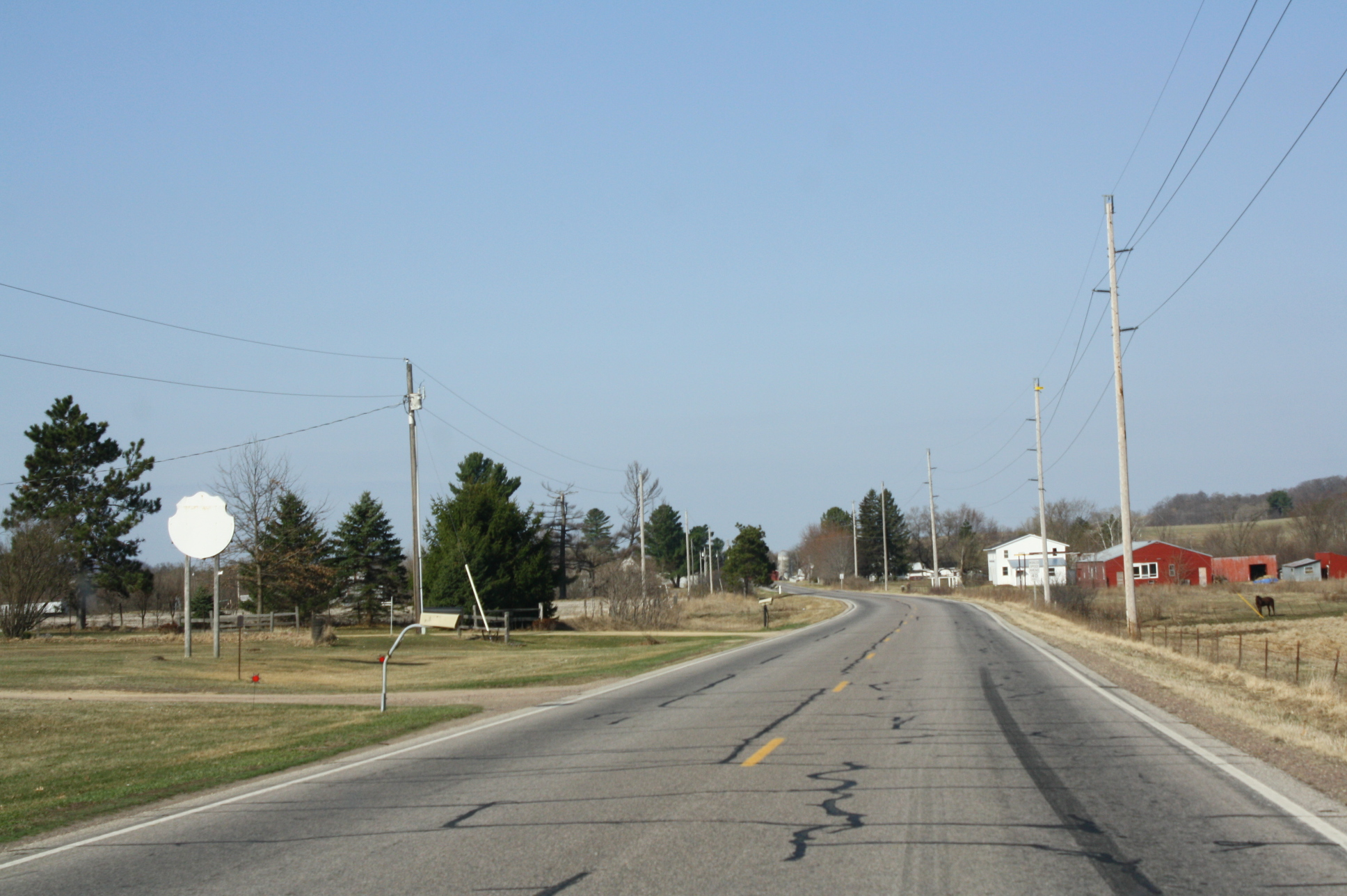
Looking west in Franklin
