= Peder Ekern =

American politician

Peder Ekern (January 23, 1837 – June 25, 1899) was an American businessman and elected official.

Peder Ekern was born near the village of Biri at Gjøvik in Oppland, Norway. The son of Henrik Ekern, he was the eldest of a family of six. He emigrated to the United States in 1868 with his wife and children. They settled first in Vernon County, Wisconsin and then in Pigeon Falls, Trempealeau County, Wisconsin. Ekern was a merchant who also operated a flour mill, creamery and farm. In 1875, Peder Ekern bought a general store and its stock of merchandise from Andrew Olson and Hans Johnson. In 1880, Ekern bought the Pigeon Falls Grist Mill from Cyrus Hubbard Hine (1825-1884). In 1885, he erected a creamery which he operated until 1892. In 1898, Ekern incorporated his various businesses interests under the name "P. Ekern Company". Following his death, management of the enterprise passed to his son-in-law.

Peder Ekern served as chairman of the town board of Pigeon and as a member of the county board. In 1881, Ekern served in the Wisconsin State Assembly as a representative from the Republican Party.

== Related Reading ==
- Pederson, Jane Marie (1992) Between Memory and Reality: Family and Community in Rural Wisconsin, 1870-1970 (Univ of Wisconsin Press) ISBN 9780299132842
- Douglas Pierce, Eben (1917) History of Trempealeau County, Wisconsin (Franklyn Curtiss-Wedge)
- (1892) Biographical History of La Crosse, Trempealeau and Buffalo Counties, Wisconsin (Chicago: Lewis Publishing Company)
