= Robert Cance =

American politician

Robert Cance was a member of the Wisconsin State Assembly.

== Biography ==
Cance was born in Wigtown, Scotland, sources have differed on the date. In 1858, he moved to the Town of Ettrick in Wisconsin, where he would become a farmer. Later, he became involved in business. Cance died in 1886.

== Political career ==
Cance was a member of the Assembly in 1883. Other positions he held include Chairman (similar to Mayor) of Ettrick and Chairman of the county board of Trempealeau County, Wisconsin. He was a Republican.
