= Franklin, Jackson County, Wisconsin =

Franklin, Wisconsin
- Town
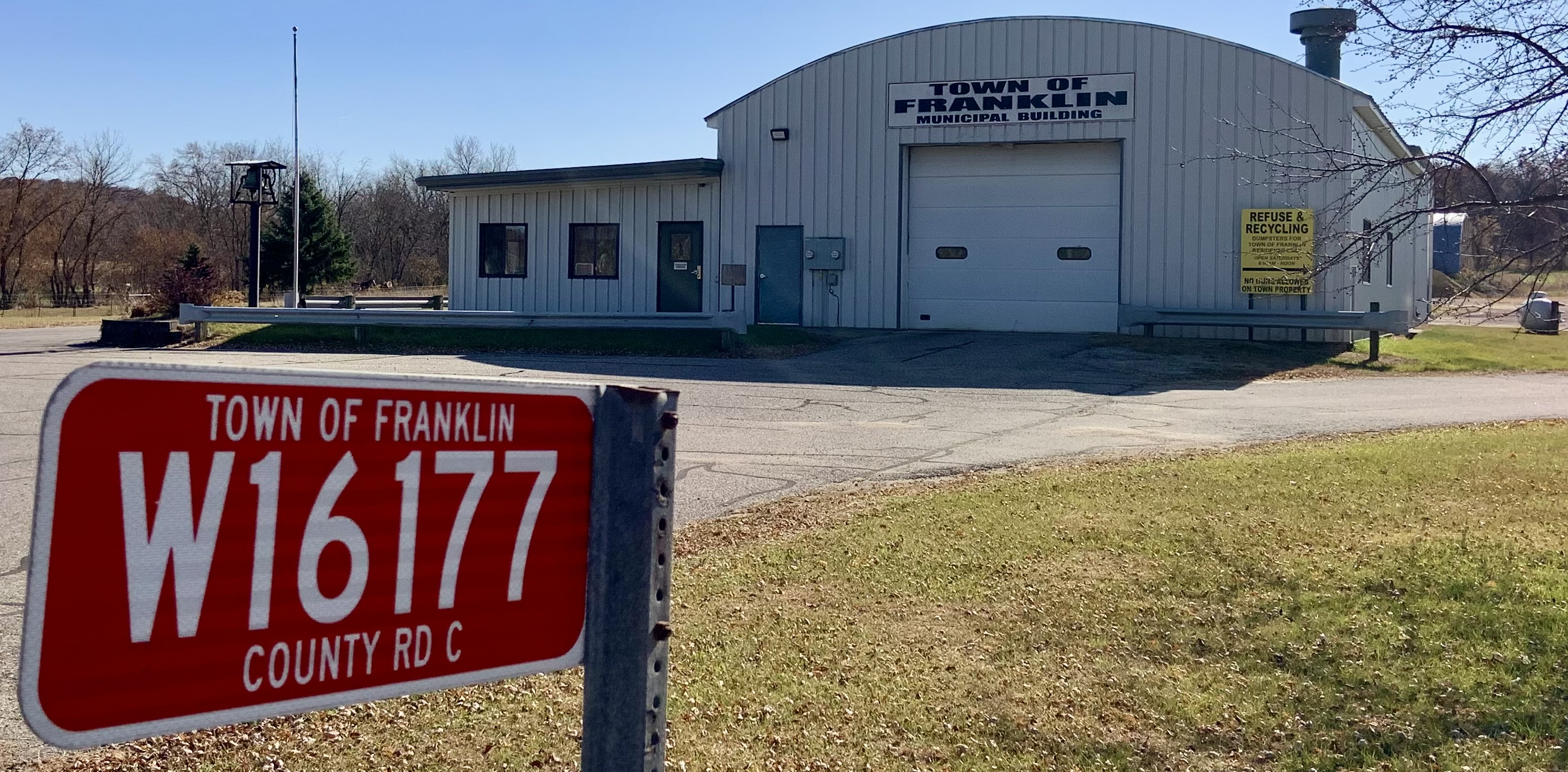
- Town hall

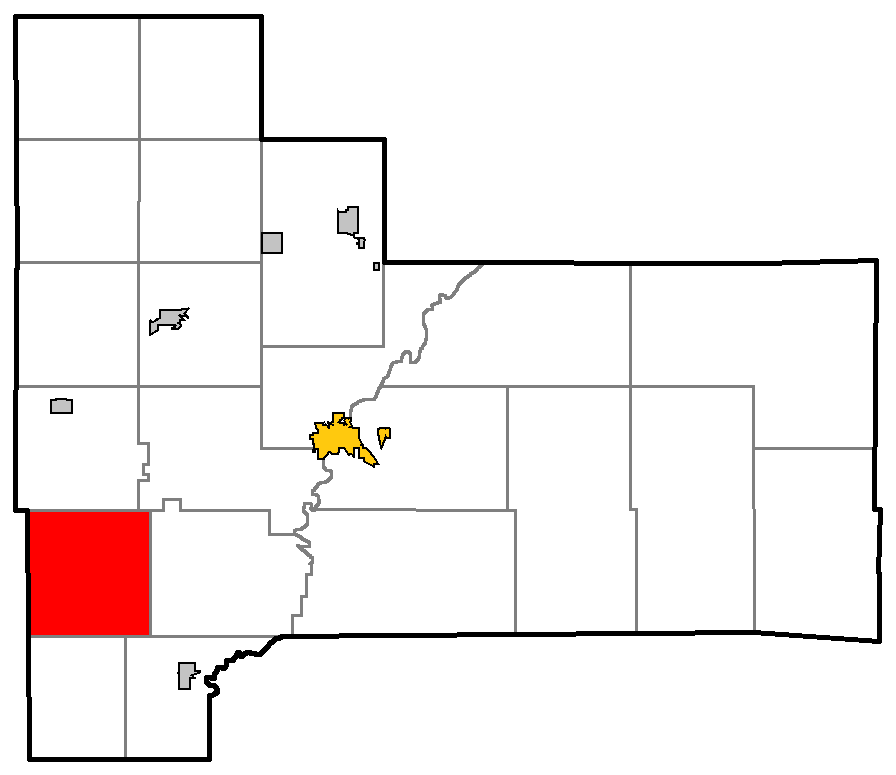
- Location of Franklin, Jackson County

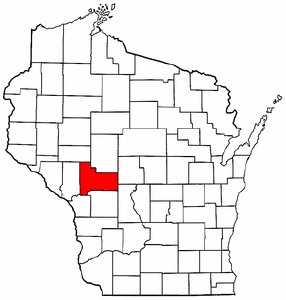
- Location of Jackson County, Wisconsin
- Coordinates: 44°12′46″N 91°5′4″W
- Country: United States
- State: Wisconsin
- County: Jackson

Area
  - Total: 36.6 sq mi (94.8 km^{2})
  - Land: 36.6 sq mi (94.8 km^{2})
  - Water: 0 sq mi (0.0 km^{2})
- Elevation: 1,119 ft (341 m)

Population (2020)
  - Total: 519
  - Density: 14.2/sq mi (5.47/km^{2})
- Time zone: UTC-6 (Central (CST))
  - Summer (DST): UTC-5 (CDT)
- FIPS code: 55-27225
- GNIS feature ID: 1583231
- Website: https://www.townoffranklin.wi.gov/

Franklin is a town in Jackson County, Wisconsin, United States. The population was 519 at the 2020 census. The unincorporated community of Franklin is located in the town. The ghost town of Rogneys was also located in the town.

== Geography ==
According to the United States Census Bureau, the town has a total area of 36.6 square miles (94.8 km^{2}), all of it land.

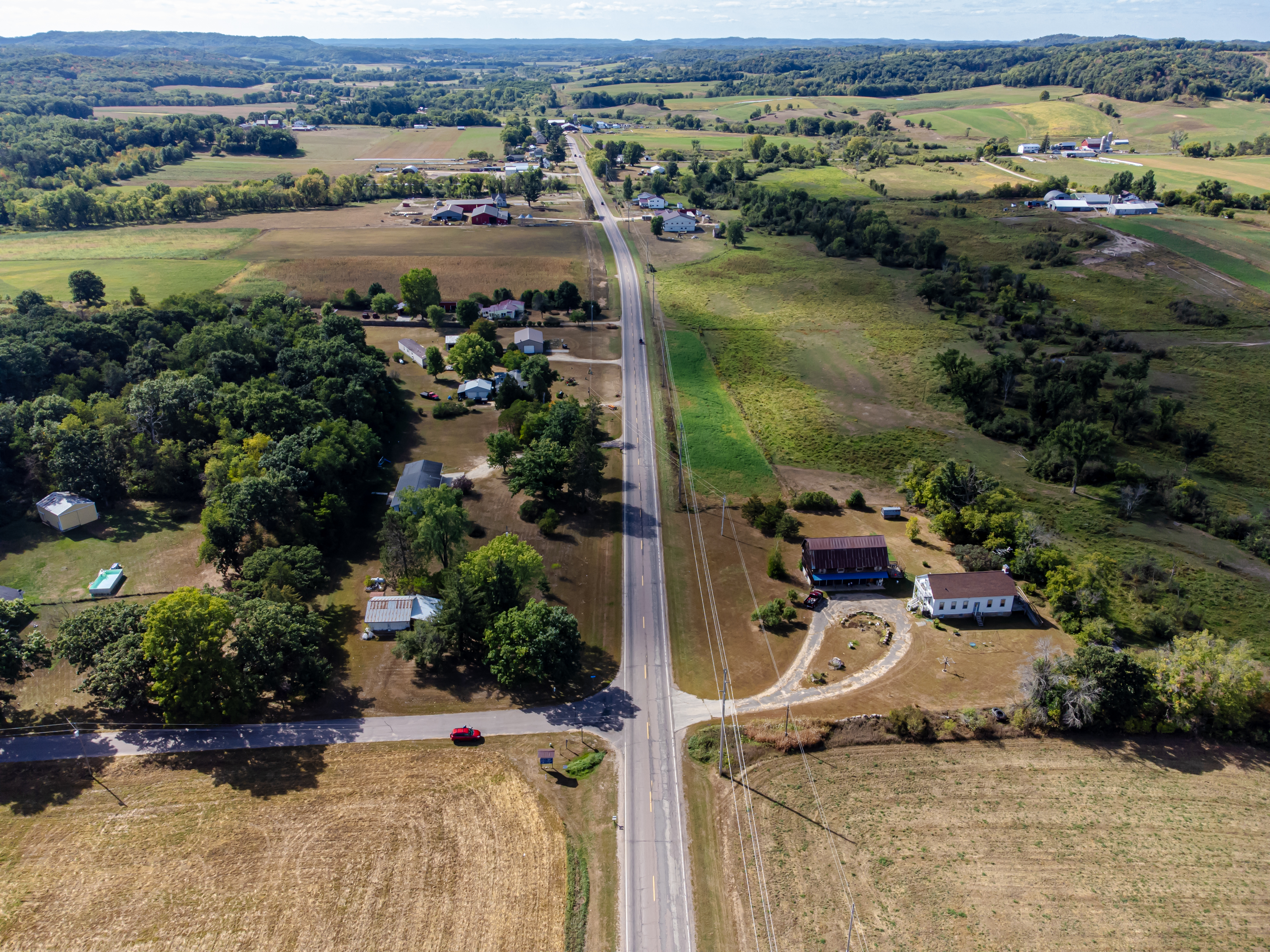
Franklin, Jackson County, Wisconsin

== Demographics ==
As of the census of 2000, there were 325 people, 129 households, and 94 families residing in the town. The population density was 8.9 people per square mile (3.4/km^{2}). There were 175 housing units at an average density of 4.8 per square mile (1.8/km^{2}). The racial makeup of the town was 100.00% White.

There were 129 households, out of which 30.2% had children under the age of 18 living with them, 58.9% were married couples living together, 6.2% had a female householder with no husband present, and 27.1% were non-families. 24.0% of all households were made up of individuals, and 7.0% had someone living alone who was 65 years of age or older. The average household size was 2.52 and the average family size was 2.96.

In the town, the population was spread out, with 22.5% under the age of 18, 8.6% from 18 to 24, 26.2% from 25 to 44, 29.2% from 45 to 64, and 13.5% who were 65 years of age or older. The median age was 43 years. For every 100 females, there were 121.1 males. For every 100 females age 18 and over, there were 121.1 males.

The median income for a household in the town was $41,250, and the median income for a family was $50,750. Males had a median income of $35,625 versus $18,333 for females. The per capita income for the town was $18,891. About 12.4% of families and 12.6% of the population were below the poverty line, including 12.8% of those under age 18 and 13.0% of those age 65 or over.

== Notable people ==
- Keith C. Hardie, member of Wisconsin State Assembly

== See also ==
- Hegg, Wisconsin
