= Arcadia (town), Wisconsin =

Arcadia, Wisconsin
- Town
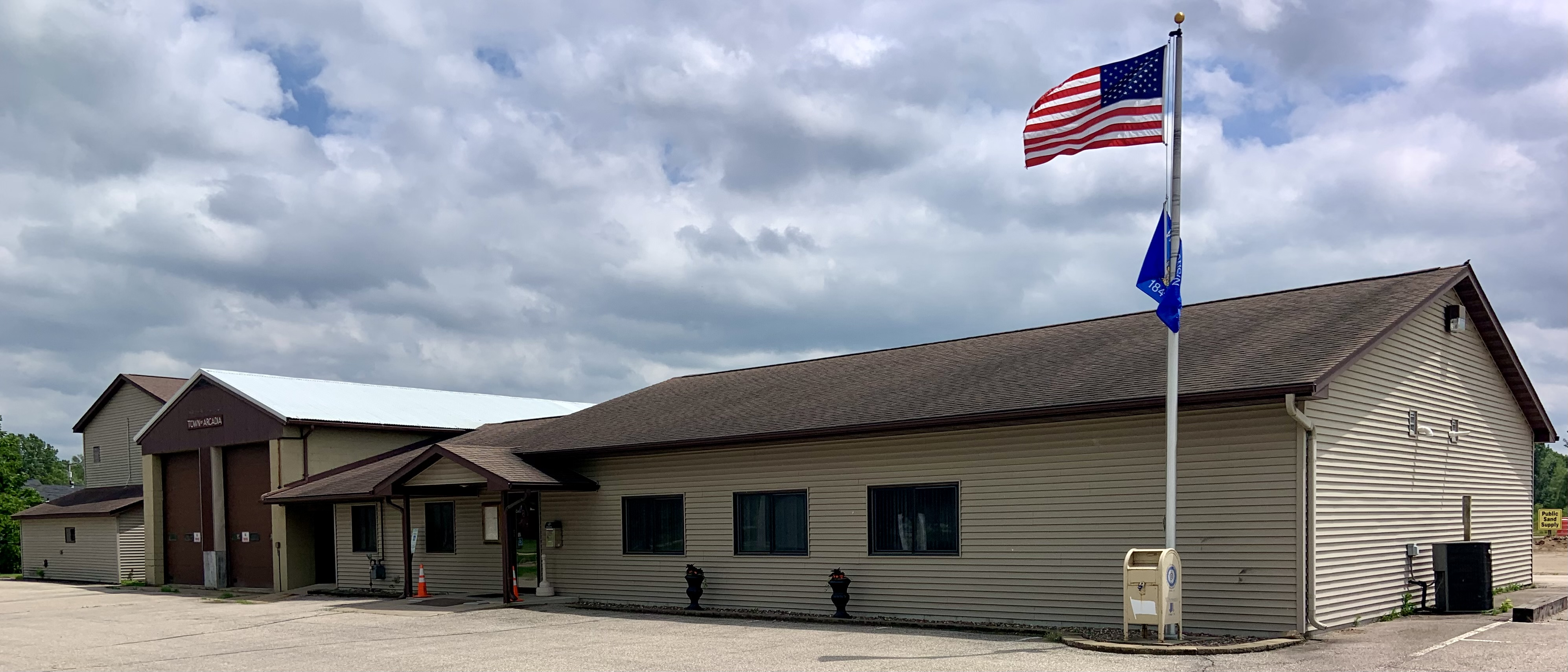
- Arcadia Town Hall

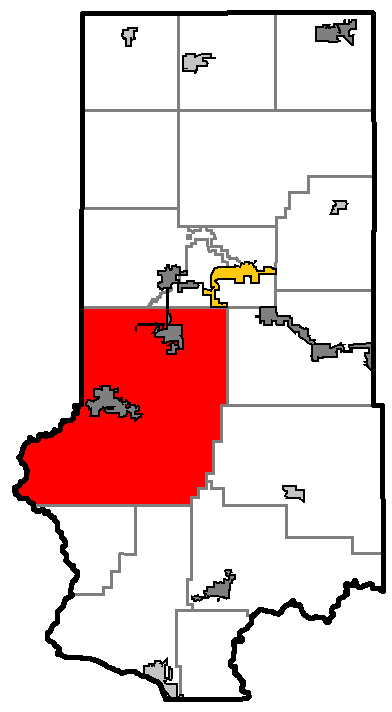
- Location of Arcadia, Trempealeau County, Wisconsin

- Location of Trempealeau County, Wisconsin
- Coordinates: 44°14′48″N 91°26′49″W
- Country: United States
- State: Wisconsin
- County: Trempealeau

Area
  - Total: 119.0 sq mi (308.3 km^{2})
  - Land: 118.8 sq mi (307.8 km^{2})
  - Water: 0.19 sq mi (0.5 km^{2})
- Elevation: 915 ft (279 m)

Population (2020)
  - Total: 1,696
  - Density: 14.27/sq mi (5.510/km^{2})
- Time zone: UTC-6 (Central (CST))
  - Summer (DST): UTC-5 (CDT)
- Area code: 608
- FIPS code: 55-02525
- GNIS feature ID: 1582706

Arcadia is a town in Trempealeau County, Wisconsin, United States. The population was 1,696 at the 2020 census. The unincorporated communities of Dewey Corners, North Creek, and Tamarack are located in the town. The ghost towns of Cortland and Williamsburg were also located in the town.

== Geography ==
According to the United States Census Bureau, the town has a total area of 119.0 square miles (308.3 km^{2}), of which 118.8 square miles (307.8 km^{2}) is land and 0.2 square mile (0.5 km^{2}) (0.17%) is water.

== Demographics ==
As of the census of 2000, there were 1,555 people, 569 households, and 433 families residing in the town. The population density was 13.1 people per square mile (5.1/km^{2}). There were 610 housing units at an average density of 5.1 per square mile (2.0/km^{2}). The racial makeup of the town was 98.65% White, 0.19% Asian, 0.51% from other races, and 0.64% from two or more races. 1.29% of the population were Hispanic or Latino of any race.

There were 569 households, out of which 39.0% had children under the age of 18 living with them, 63.6% were married couples living together, 6.2% had a female householder with no husband present, and 23.9% were non-families. 19.2% of all households were made up of individuals, and 7.2% had someone living alone who was 65 years of age or older. The average household size was 2.73 and the average family size was 3.16.

In the town, the population was spread out, with 28.2% under the age of 18, 6.8% from 18 to 24, 29.1% from 25 to 44, 24.4% from 45 to 64, and 11.6% who were 65 years of age or older. The median age was 38 years. For every 100 females, there were 112.4 males. For every 100 females age 18 and over, there were 112.0 males.

The median income for a household in the town was $45,588, and the median income for a family was $50,511. Males had a median income of $30,208 versus $22,614 for females. The per capita income for the town was $20,421. About 6.4% of families and 8.6% of the population were below the poverty line, including 12.2% of those under age 18 and 13.9% of those age 65 or over.

== Notable people ==
- John C. Gaveney, Wisconsin State Senator and jurist, was born in the town
- Anne Pellowski, the writer, educator and Kashubian-American activist, was born and raised on a farm in the Town of Arcadia
