= Beaches Corners, Wisconsin =

- Unincorporated community
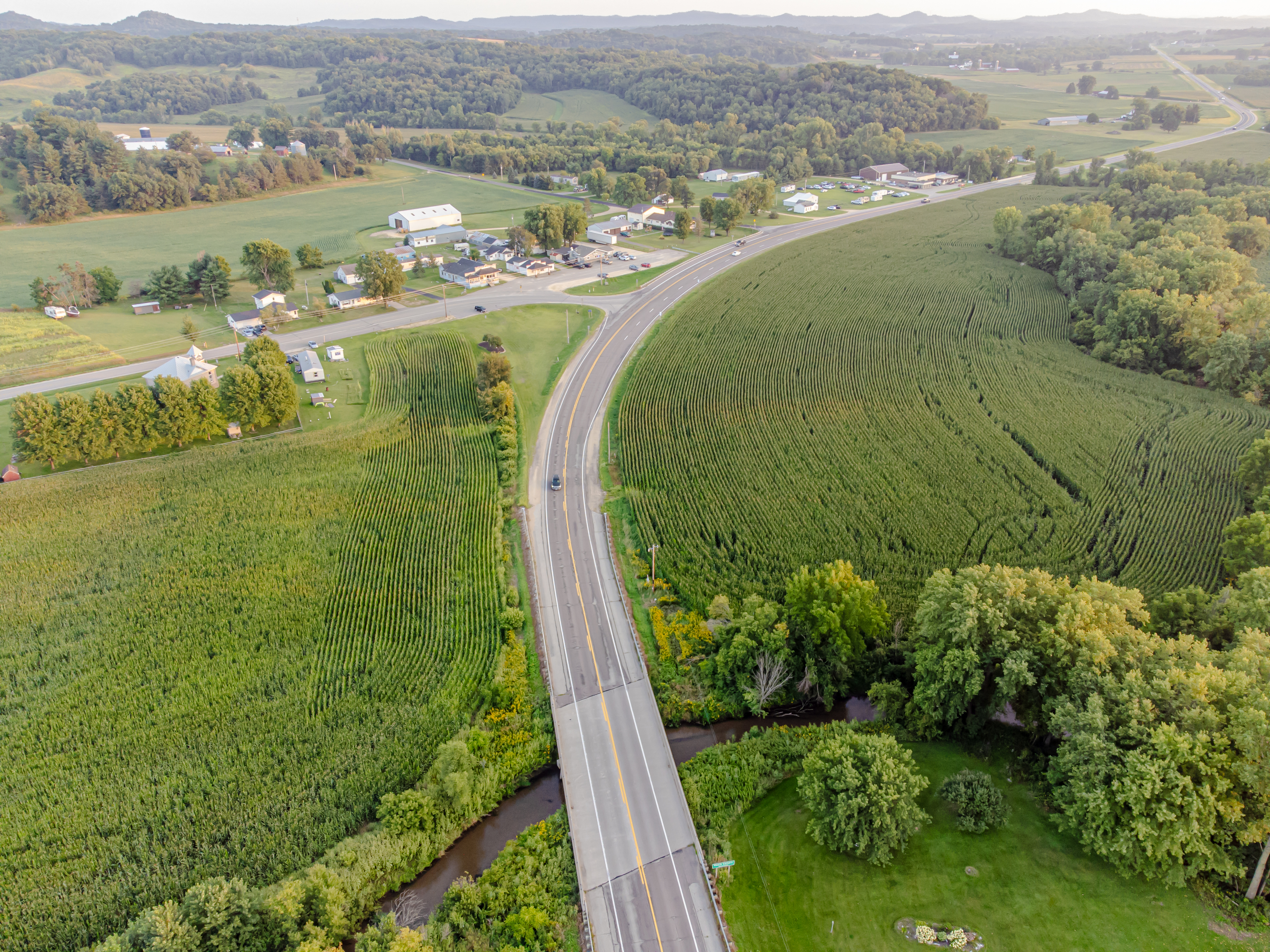
- U.S. Route 53 runs through town

- Location within Wisconsin Location within the United States
- Coordinates: 44°12′05″N 91°14′15″W
- Country: United States
- State: Wisconsin
- County: Trempealeau
- Elevation: 804 ft (245 m)
- Time zone: UTC-6 (Central (CST))
  - Summer (DST): UTC-5 (CDT)
- Area codes: 715 & 534
- GNIS feature ID: 1561332

Beaches Corners is an unincorporated community located in the town of Ettrick, Trempealeau County, Wisconsin, United States. The community was named for the Beach family. Charles G. Beach emigrated from Vermont in the mid 1860s. His sons Joseph and Fred were owners and editors of the Whitehall Times in the late 19th century.

== Gallery ==
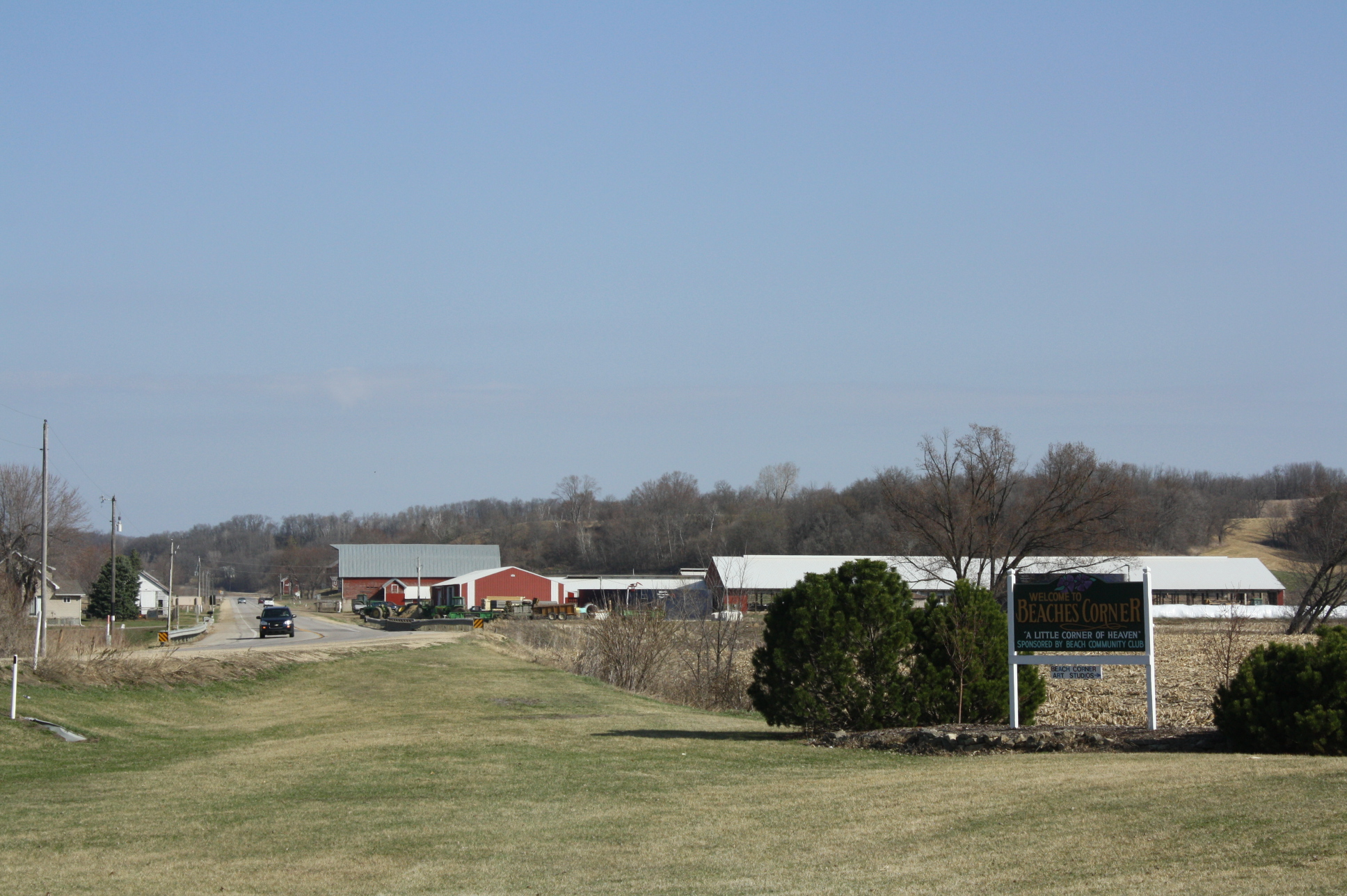
Looking at the north side of Beaches Corners

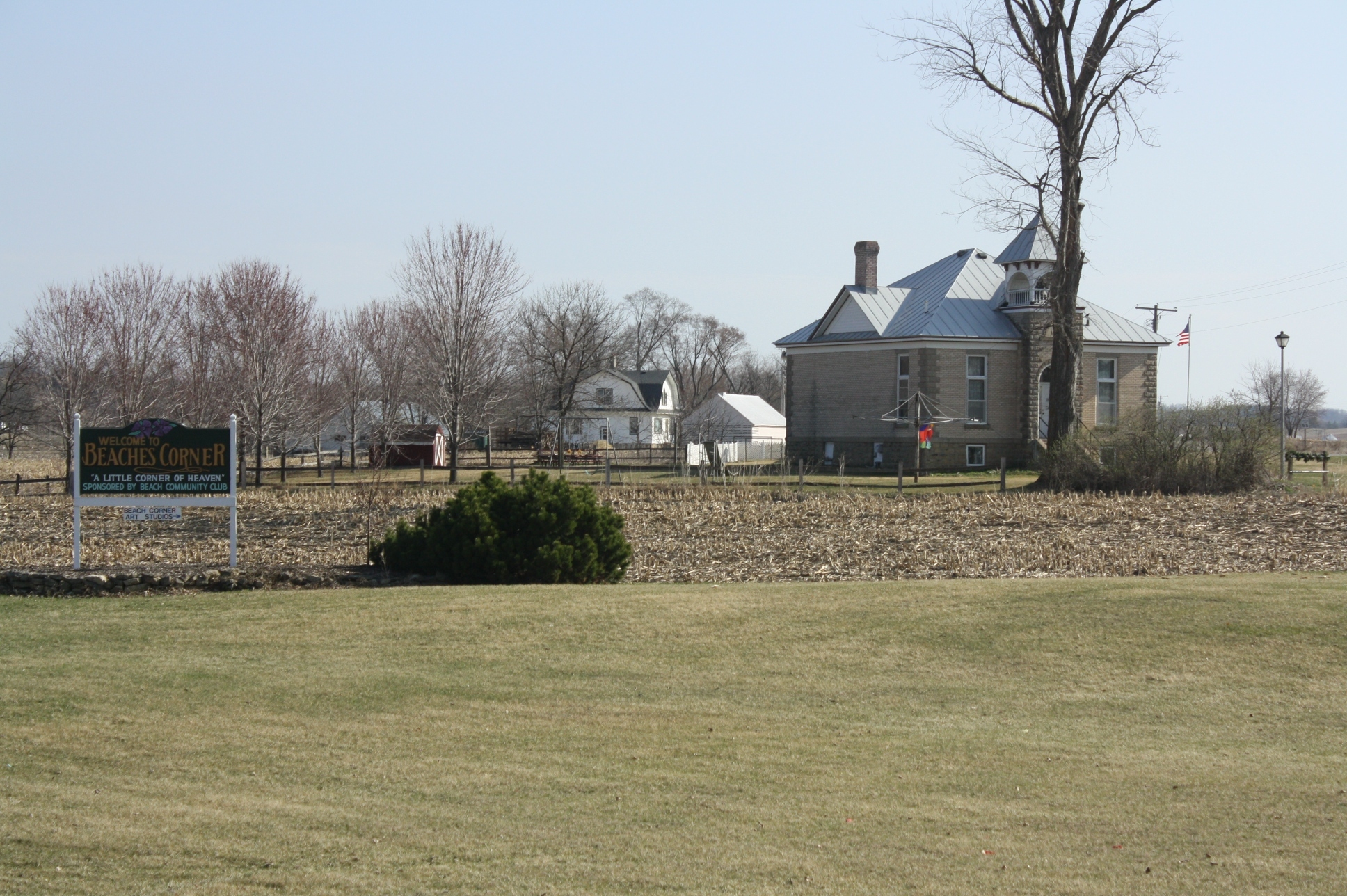
Sign and school
