= Centerville, Trempealeau County, Wisconsin =

Centerville, Wisconsin
- Unincorporated community
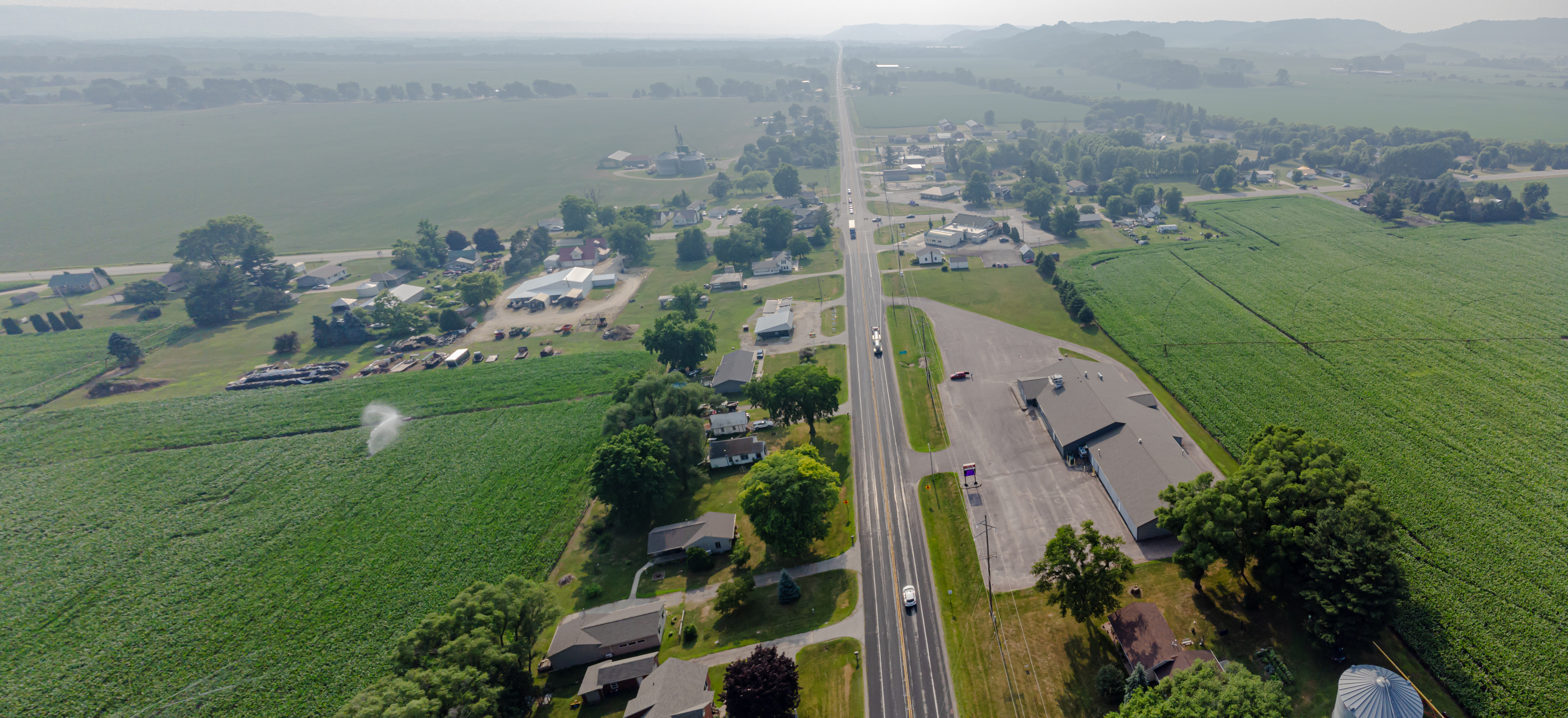

- Location within Wisconsin Location within the United States
- Coordinates: 44°04′12″N 91°27′05″W
- Country: United States
- State: Wisconsin
- County: Trempealeau
- Elevation: 738 ft (225 m)
- Time zone: UTC-6 (Central (CST))
  - Summer (DST): UTC-5 (CDT)
- Area codes: 715 & 534
- GNIS feature ID: 1562894

Centerville (also Centreville) is an unincorporated community in the Town of Trempealeau, Trempealeau County, Wisconsin, United States.

== Description ==
The community is located at the intersection of Wisconsin Highway 35, Wisconsin Highway 93, and Wisconsin Highway 54 along the Great River Road. Centerville uses the 608 area code.

The Centerville Curling Club was organized in 1947, with three sheets of curling ice. A new four-sheet facility was built in 1996 in conjunction with the Trempealeau Town Hall. The building that housed the original curling club burned the night of August 15-16, 2021.

Centerville is the childhood home of Dan Guillou, a 1988 graduate of Gale-Ettrick-Trempealeau High School and a member of the 2000 US Paralympic Wheelchair Rugby team that won a gold medal in Sydney.

== Gallery ==
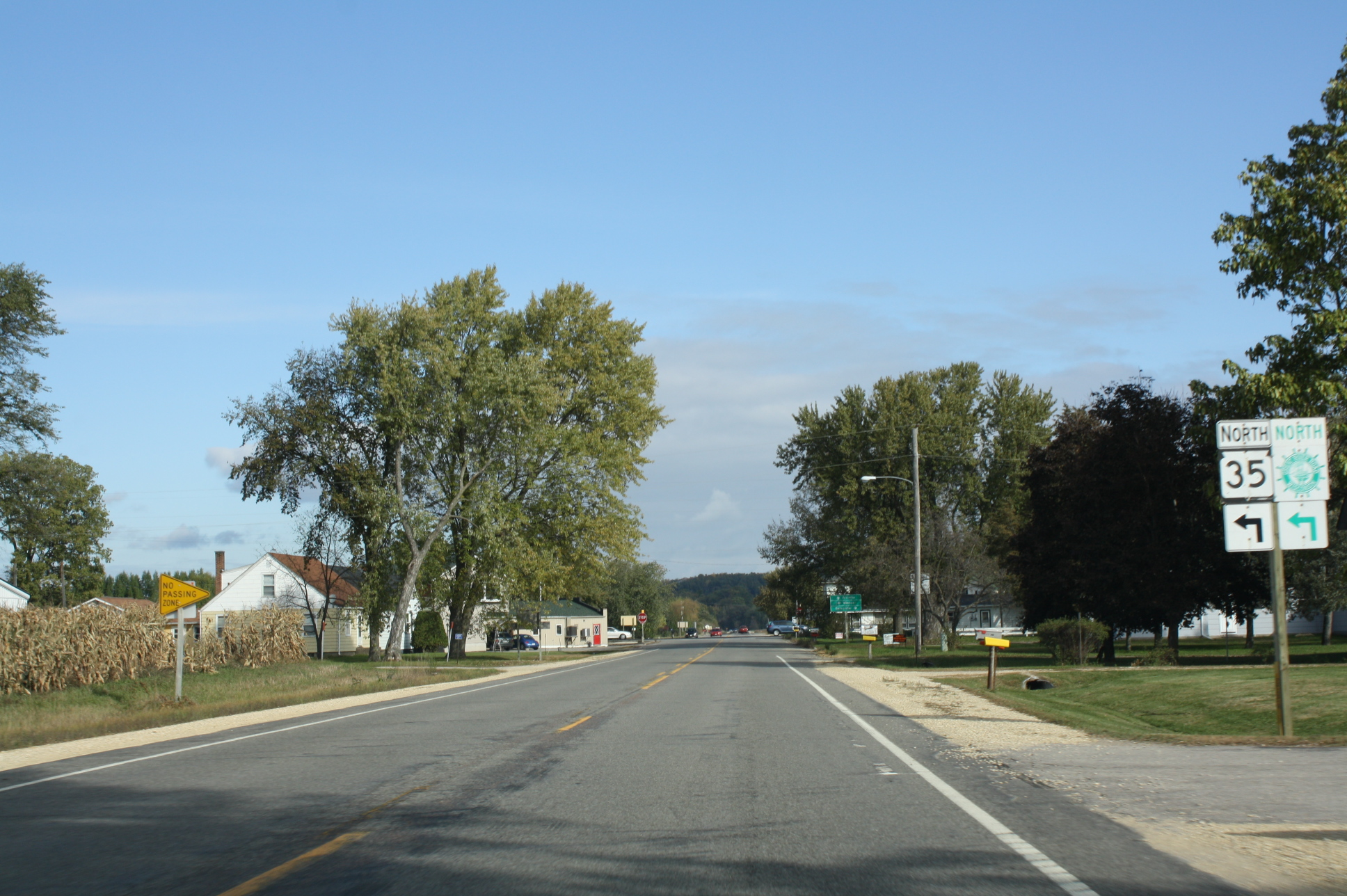

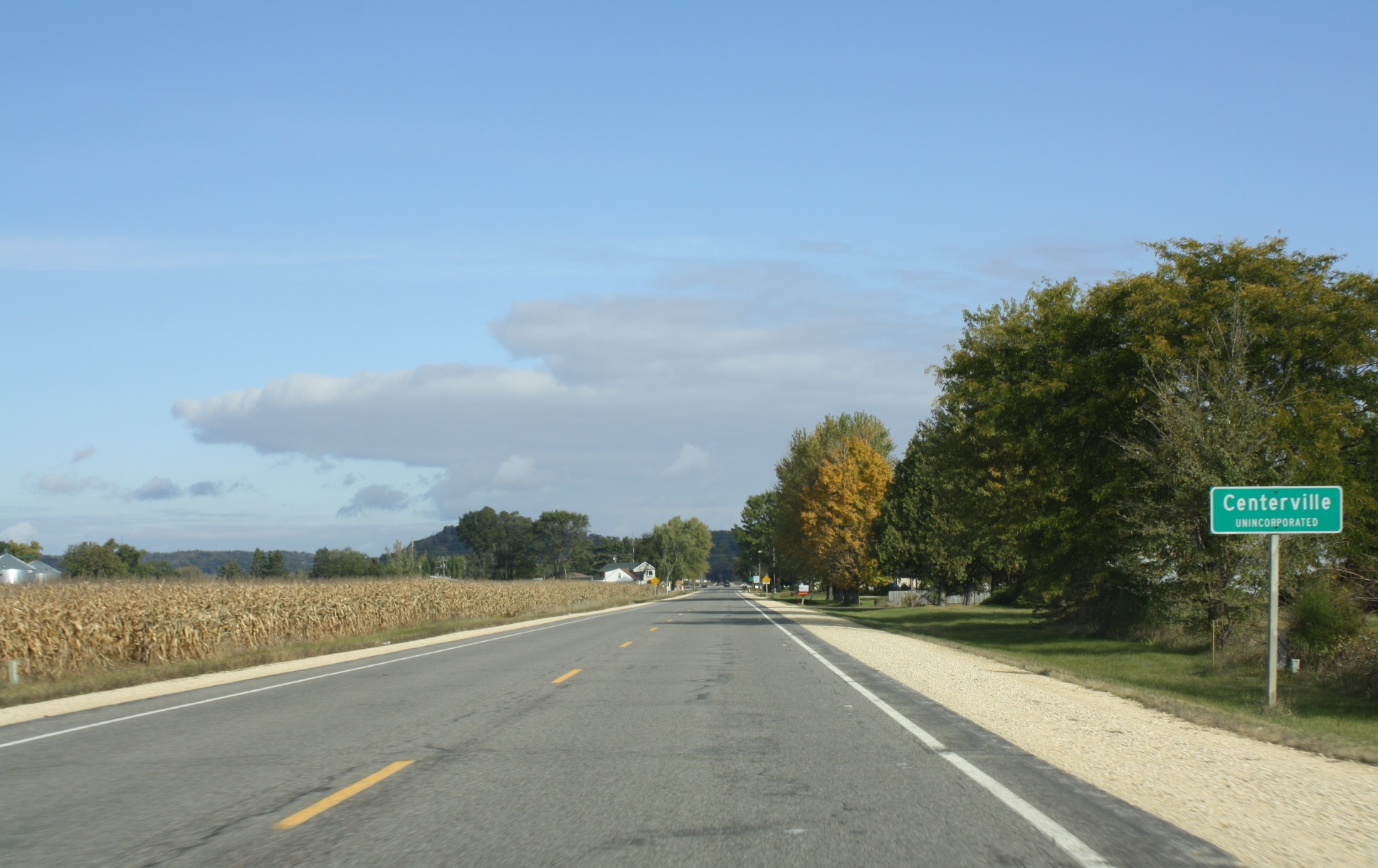
Looking north at the entrance sign
