= Gale, Wisconsin =

- Town
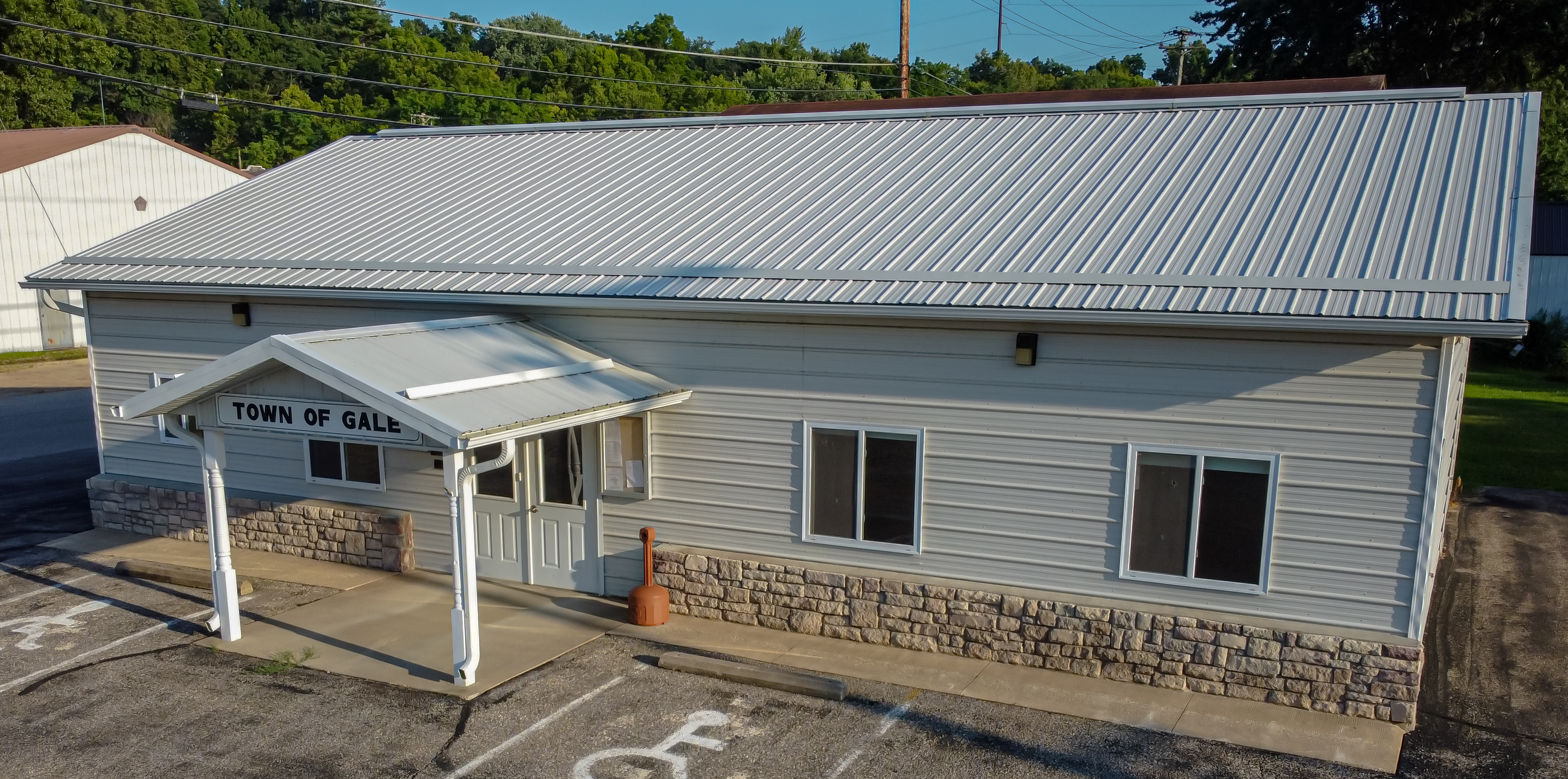
- Gale Town Hall

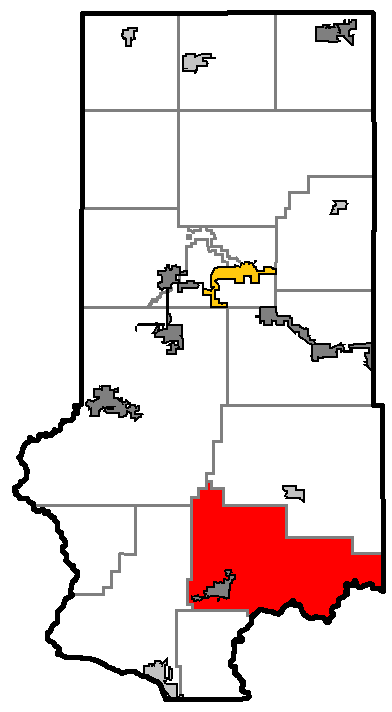
- Location of Gale, Trempealeau County

- Location of Trempealeau County, Wisconsin
- Coordinates: 44°6′48″N 91°18′41″W
- Country: United States
- State: Wisconsin
- County: Trempealeau

Area
  - Total: 61.0 sq mi (158.1 km^{2})
  - Land: 60.5 sq mi (156.7 km^{2})
  - Water: 0.54 sq mi (1.4 km^{2})
- Elevation: 863 ft (263 m)

Population (2020)
  - Total: 1,708
  - Density: 28.23/sq mi (10.90/km^{2})
- Time zone: UTC-6 (Central (CST))
  - Summer (DST): UTC-5 (CDT)
- Area code: 608
- FIPS code: 55-28150
- GNIS feature ID: 1583253
- Website: https://www.townofgalewi.gov/

Gale is a town in Trempealeau County, Wisconsin, United States. The population was 1,708 at the 2020 census. The unincorporated communities of Butman Corners and Frenchville are located in the town.

== Geography ==
According to the United States Census Bureau, the town has a total area of 61.0 square miles (158.1 km^{2}), of which 60.5 square miles (156.7 km^{2}) is land and 0.6 square mile (1.5 km^{2}) (0.92%) is water.

== Demographics ==
As of the census of 2000, there were 1,426 people, 562 households, and 419 families residing in the town. The population density was 23.6 people per square mile (9.1/km^{2}). There were 592 housing units at an average density of 9.8 per square mile (3.8/km^{2}). The racial makeup of the town was 98.39% White, 0.14% African American, 0.14% Asian, 0.28% from other races, and 1.05% from two or more races. Hispanic or Latino of any race were 0.21% of the population.

There were 562 households, out of which 32.7% had children under the age of 18 living with them, 65.3% were married couples living together, 5.7% had a female householder with no husband present, and 25.3% were non-families. 19.6% of all households were made up of individuals, and 8.9% had someone living alone who was 65 years of age or older. The average household size was 2.54 and the average family size was 2.93.

In the town, the population was spread out, with 24.8% under the age of 18, 5.4% from 18 to 24, 27.8% from 25 to 44, 27.7% from 45 to 64, and 14.3% who were 65 years of age or older. The median age was 40 years. For every 100 females, there were 103.4 males. For every 100 females age 18 and over, there were 103.6 males.

The median income for a household in the town was $45,489, and the median income for a family was $50,417. Males had a median income of $34,375 versus $23,182 for females. The per capita income for the town was $20,442. About 6.0% of families and 6.0% of the population were below the poverty line, including 6.3% of those under age 18 and 15.9% of those age 65 or over.

== Gallery ==
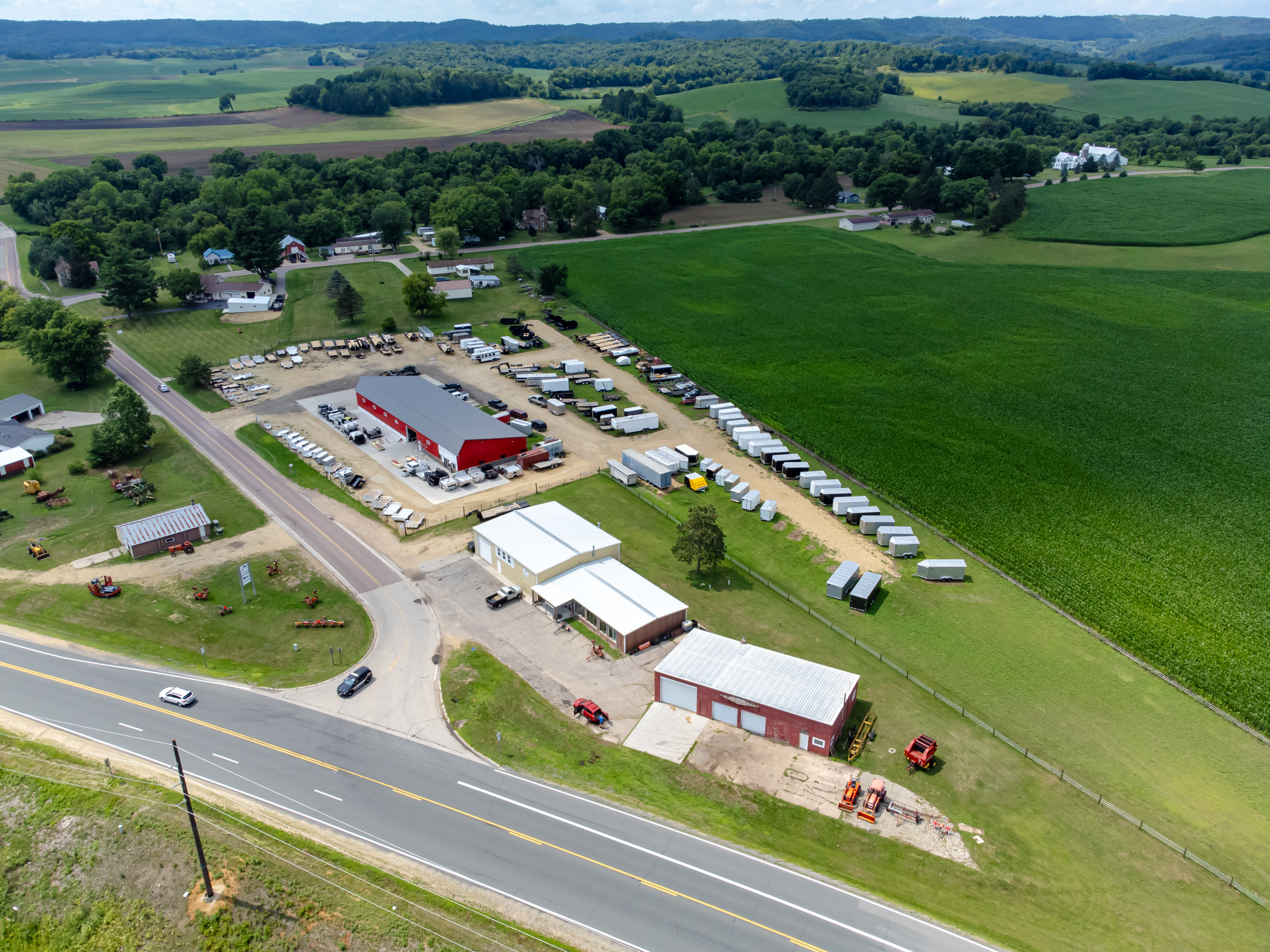
Frenchville, Wisconsin
