= Coral City, Wisconsin =

- Unincorporated community
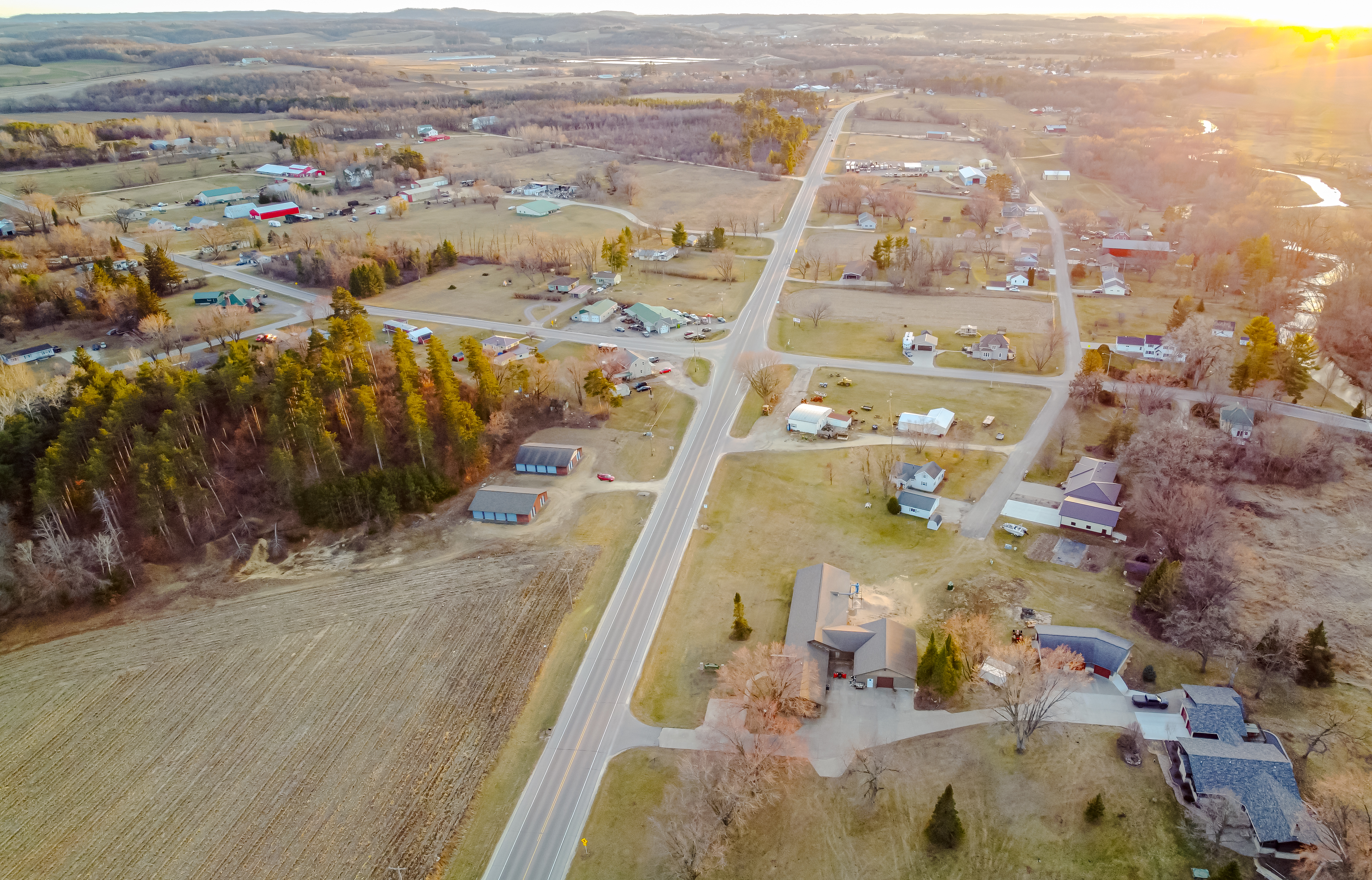
- US-53 runs through town

- Location within Wisconsin Location within the United States
- Coordinates: 44°22′46″N 91°16′39″W
- Country: United States
- State: Wisconsin
- County: Trempealeau
- Elevation: 837 ft (255 m)
- Time zone: UTC-6 (Central (CST))
  - Summer (DST): UTC-5 (CDT)
- Area codes: 715 & 534
- GNIS feature ID: 1563395

Coral City is an unincorporated community located in the town of Pigeon, Trempealeau County, Wisconsin, United States. Coral City is located at the junction of U.S. Route 53, Wisconsin Highway 121 and County Highway S, 2.1 miles (3.4 km) east-northeast of Whitehall.
