= Trempealeau (town), Wisconsin =

Civil town in Trempealeau County, Wisconsin

Trempealeau, Wisconsin
- Town
- Town of Trempealeau
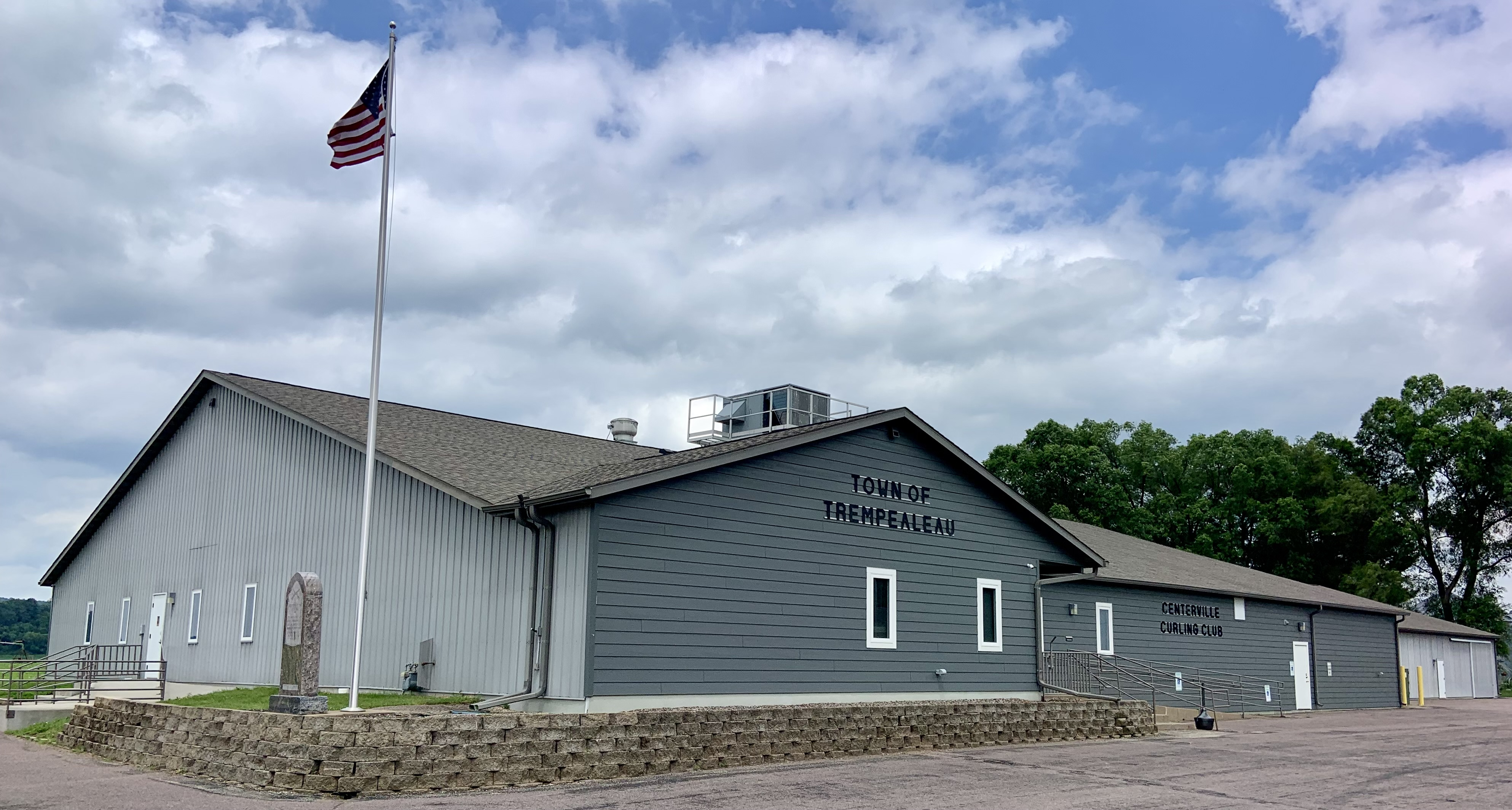
- Trempealeau Town Hall in Centerville

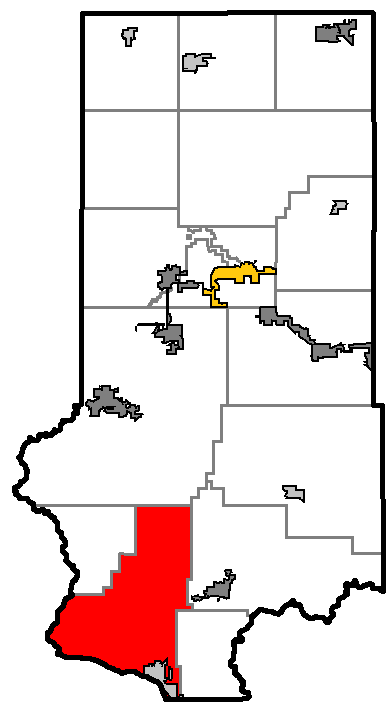
- Location of Trempealeau, Trempealeau County

- Location of Trempealeau County, Wisconsin
- Coordinates: 44°04′17″N 91°27′42″W
- Country: United States
- State: Wisconsin
- County: Trempealeau

Area
  - Total: 56.29 sq mi (145.8 km^{2})
  - Land: 49.86 sq mi (129.1 km^{2})
  - Water: 6.44 sq mi (16.7 km^{2})

Population (2020)
  - Total: 1,951
  - Density: 39.13/sq mi (15.11/km^{2})
- Time zone: UTC-6 (Central (CST))
  - Summer (DST): UTC-5 (CDT)
- Area code(s): 608 and 353
- GNIS feature ID: 1584291
- Website: https://tn.trempealeau.wi.gov/

Trempealeau (/ˈtrɛmpəloʊ/ TREM-pə-loh) is a town in Trempealeau County, Wisconsin, United States. The population was 1,951 at the 2020 census. The town surrounds the village of Trempealeau. The unincorporated communities of Centerville, West Prairie, and Wrights Corners are in the town.

== Geography ==
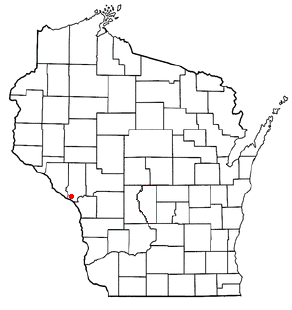
Location of Trempealeau (town), Wisconsin

According to the United States Census Bureau, the town has a total area of 57.2 square miles (148.1 km^{2}), of which 51.0 square miles (132.1 km^{2}) is land and 6.2 square miles (16.0 km^{2}) (10.80%) is water.

== Demographics ==
As of the census of 2000, there were 1,618 people, 623 households, and 459 families residing in the town. The population density was 31.7 people per square mile (12.2/km^{2}). There were 707 housing units at an average density of 13.9 per square mile (5.4/km^{2}). The racial makeup of the town was 99.20% White, 0.12% Black or African American, 0.25% Native American, 0.19% Asian, and 0.25% from two or more races. 0.31% of the population were Hispanic or Latino of any race.

There were 623 households, out of which 33.7% had children under the age of 18 living with them, 64.5% were married couples living together, 5.5% had a female householder with no husband present, and 26.3% were non-families. 22.2% of all households were made up of individuals, and 9.5% had someone living alone who was 65 years of age or older. The average household size was 2.60 and the average family size was 3.05.

In the town, the population was 25.3% under the age of 18, 6.6% from 18 to 24, 29.4% from 25 to 44, 27.5% from 45 to 64, and 11.2% who were 65 years of age or older. The median age was 39 years. For every 100 females, there were 112.3 males. For every 100 females age 18 and over, there were 111.0 males.

The median income for a household in the town was $45,179, and the median income for a family was $50,000. Males had a median income of $32,697 versus $21,528 for females. The per capita income for the town was $20,039. About 3.2% of families and 5.2% of the population were below the poverty line, including 1.5% of those under age 18 and 23.4% of those age 65 or over.
