= Pigeon, Wisconsin =

- Town
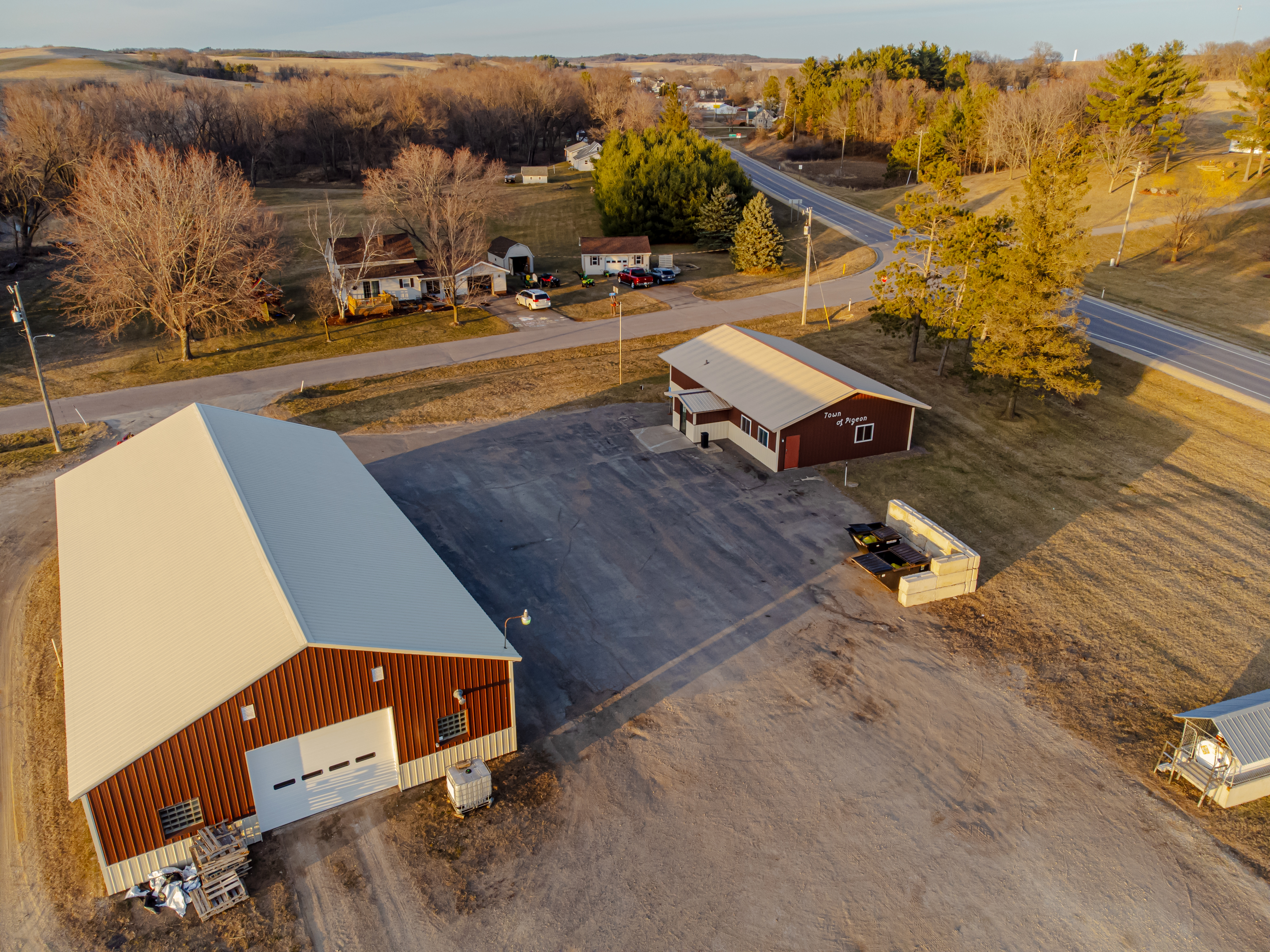
- Pigeon town hall

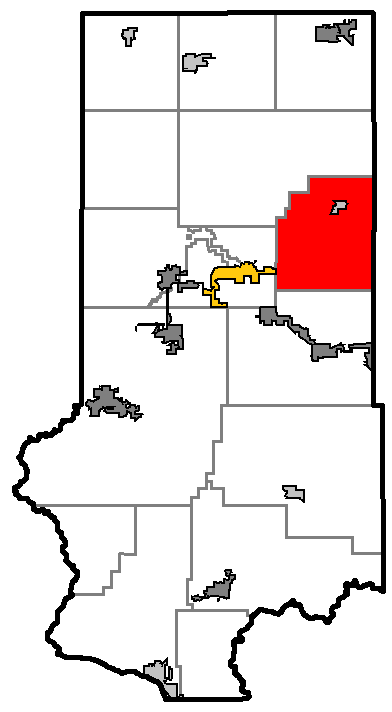
- Location of Pigeon, Trempealeau County

- Location of Trempealeau County, Wisconsin
- Coordinates: 44°24′11″N 91°12′56″W
- Country: United States
- State: Wisconsin
- County: Trempealeau

Area
  - Total: 38.6 sq mi (99.9 km^{2})
  - Land: 38.6 sq mi (99.9 km^{2})
  - Water: 0 sq mi (0.0 km^{2})
- Elevation: 873 ft (266 m)

Population (2020)
  - Total: 1,018
  - Density: 26.4/sq mi (10.2/km^{2})
- Time zone: UTC-6 (Central (CST))
  - Summer (DST): UTC-5 (CDT)
- FIPS code: 55-62650
- GNIS feature ID: 1583921

Pigeon is a town in Trempealeau County, Wisconsin, United States. The population was 1,018 at the 2020 census. The unincorporated community of Coral City is located in the town.

== Geography ==
According to the United States Census Bureau, the town has a total area of 38.6 square miles (99.9 km^{2}), all land.

== Demographics ==
As of the census of 2000, there were 894 people, 305 households, and 239 families residing in the town. The population density was 23.2 people per square mile (8.9/km^{2}). There were 326 housing units at an average density of 8.5 per square mile (3.3/km^{2}). The racial makeup of the town was 98.10% White, 0.34% from other races, and 1.57% from two or more races. Hispanic or Latino of any race were 1.23% of the population.

There were 305 households, out of which 36.1% had children under the age of 18 living with them, 65.6% were married couples living together, 7.5% had a female householder with no husband present, and 21.6% were non-families. 17.0% of all households were made up of individuals, and 6.2% had someone living alone who was 65 years of age or older. The average household size was 2.93 and the average family size was 3.30.

In the town, the population was 32.1% under the age of 18, 7.6% from 18 to 24, 24.5% from 25 to 44, 27.5% from 45 to 64, and 8.3% who were 65 years of age or older. The median age was 34 years. For every 100 females, there were 102.7 males. For every 100 females age 18 and over, there were 106.5 males.

The median income for a household in the town was $37,708, and the median income for a family was $45,156. Males had a median income of $27,596 versus $21,250 for females. The per capita income for the town was $14,752. About 10.2% of families and 21.0% of the population were below the poverty line, including 38.6% of those under age 18 and 8.4% of those age 65 or over.

== Notable people ==
- Herman Ekern, Wisconsin Lieutenant Governor, lawyer, and legislator, was born in the town
- Peder Ekern, Wisconsin State Representative, farmer, and businessman, lived in the town; Ekern was chairman of the town board
