= Buttmann =

Buttmann is a German surname. Notable people with the surname include:

- Philipp Karl Buttmann (1764–1829), German philologist and expert on the Greek language
- Rudolf Buttmann, German diplomat

== See also ==
- Butman (disambiguation)
- Buttman
- Peräsmies, whose name translates into English as "Butt Man"
