= Dewey Corners, Wisconsin =

- Unincorporated community
- Location within Wisconsin Location within the United States
- Coordinates: 44°15′02″N 91°28′25″W
- Country: United States
- State: Wisconsin
- County: Trempealeau
- Elevation: 784 ft (239 m)
- Time zone: UTC-6 (Central (CST))
  - Summer (DST): UTC-5 (CDT)
- Area codes: 715 & 534
- GNIS feature ID: 1851090

Dewey Corners is an unincorporated community in the town of Arcadia, Trempealeau County, Wisconsin, United States, United States. The community was named for George D. Dewey, a local land owner.
