= Ettrick (village), Wisconsin =

Ettrick, Wisconsin
- Village
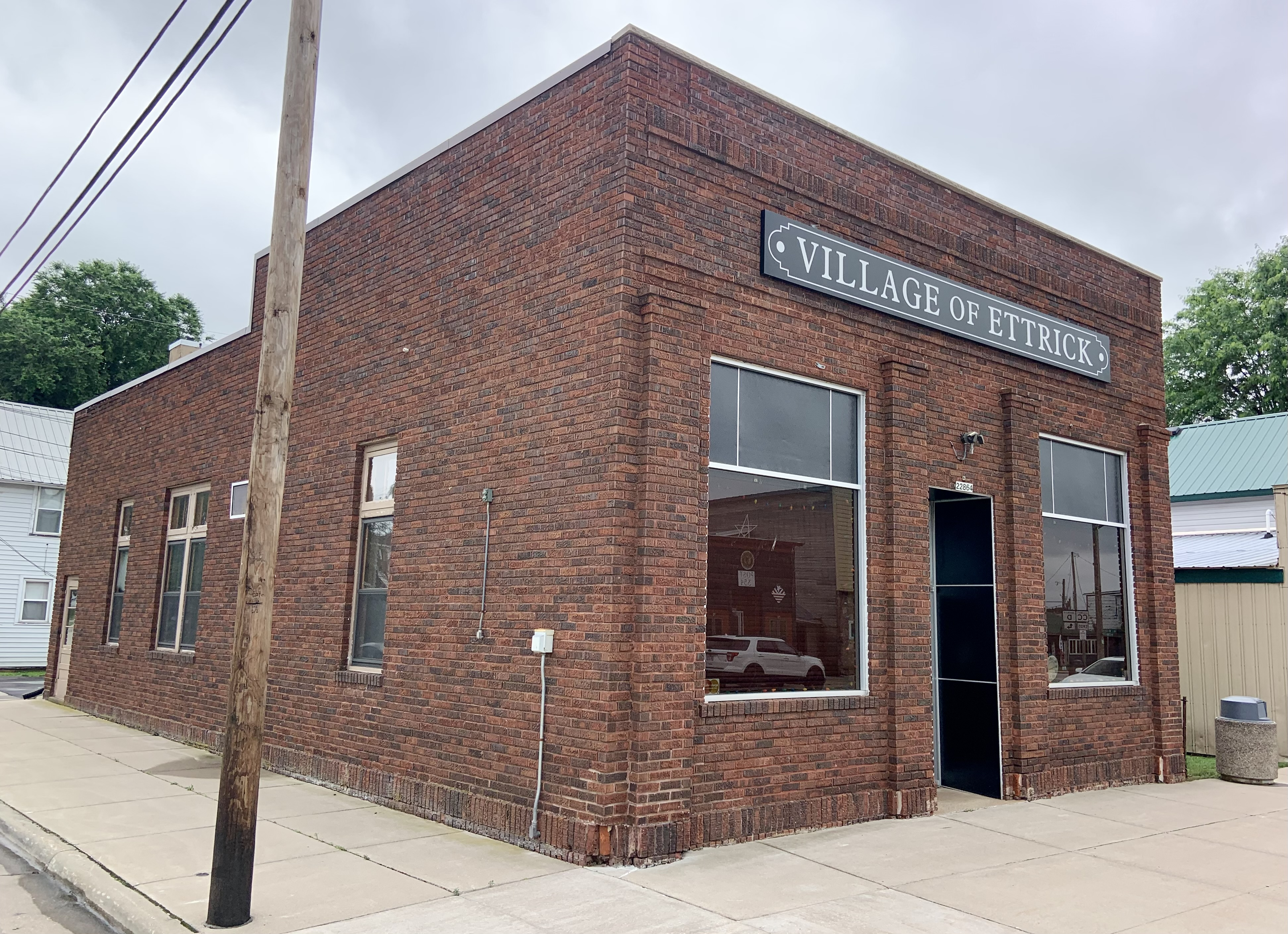
- Ettrick Village Hall

- Location of Ettrick in Trempealeau County, Wisconsin.
- Coordinates: 44°11′28″N 91°14′58″W
- Country: United States
- State: Wisconsin
- County: Trempealeau

Area
  - Total: 0.74 sq mi (1.91 km^{2})
  - Land: 0.74 sq mi (1.91 km^{2})
  - Water: 0 sq mi (0.00 km^{2})
- Elevation: 791 ft (241 m)

Population (2020)
  - Total: 525
  - Density: 702.0/sq mi (271.03/km^{2})
- Time zone: UTC-6 (Central (CST))
  - Summer (DST): UTC-5 (CDT)
- Area code: 608
- FIPS code: 55-24425
- GNIS feature ID: 1583175
- Website: Village of Ettrick

Ettrick is a village in Trempealeau County, Wisconsin, United States. The population was 525 at the 2020 census. The village is surrounded by the Town of Ettrick.

== History ==
The post office was originally named Armagh when it was established in July 1860. However, the first postmaster, John Cance, renamed it a few months later to Ettrick for Ettrick Forest, which is a hunting preserve in Scotland.

== Geography ==
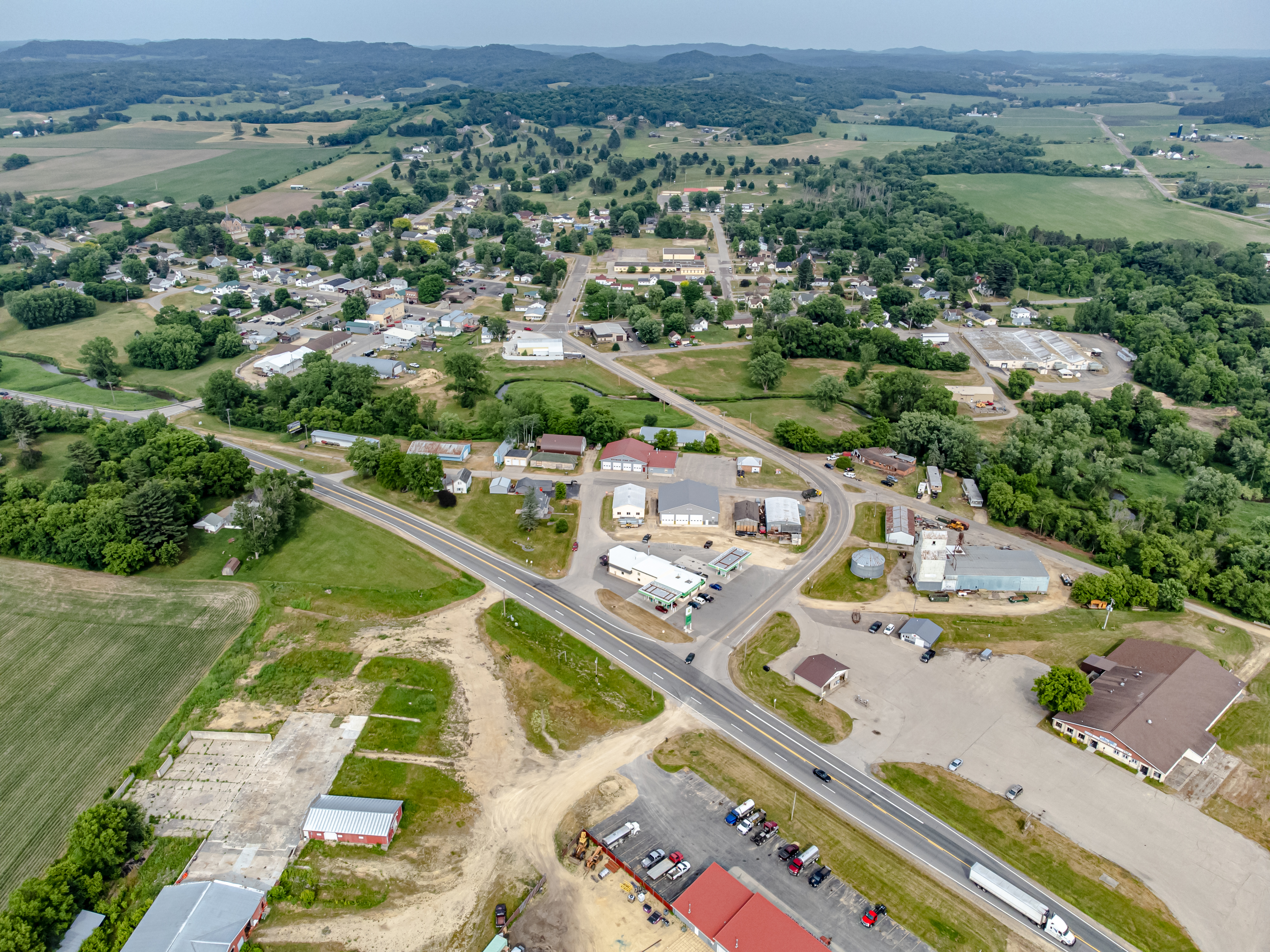
US-53 runs through town

Ettrick is located at 44°10′10″N 91°16′8″W (44.169531, -91.269032).

According to the United States Census Bureau, the village has a total area of 0.70 square miles (1.81 km^{2}), all land.

== Demographics ==
Historical population
Census	Pop.	Note	%±
1950	415		—
1960	479		15.4%
1970	463		−3.3%
1980	462		−0.2%
1990	461		−0.2%
2000	521		13.0%
2010	524		0.6%
2020	525		0.2%
U.S. Decennial Census

=== 2010 census ===
As of the census of 2010, there were 524 people, 231 households, and 145 families living in the village. The population density was 748.6 inhabitants per square mile (289.0/km^{2}). There were 256 housing units at an average density of 365.7 per square mile (141.2/km^{2}). The racial makeup of the village was 98.1% White, 0.2% African American, 0.2% Native American, 0.8% from other races, and 0.8% from two or more races. Hispanic or Latino of any race were 2.1% of the population.

There were 231 households, of which 33.3% had children under the age of 18 living with them, 48.1% were married couples living together, 11.7% had a female householder with no husband present, 3.0% had a male householder with no wife present, and 37.2% were non-families. 30.7% of all households were made up of individuals, and 13.9% had someone living alone who was 65 years of age or older. The average household size was 2.27 and the average family size was 2.86.

The median age in the village was 40.8 years. 24% of residents were under the age of 18; 7.3% were between the ages of 18 and 24; 24.7% were from 25 to 44; 27.6% were from 45 to 64; and 16.4% were 65 years of age or older. The gender makeup of the village was 49.4% male and 50.6% female.

=== 2000 census ===
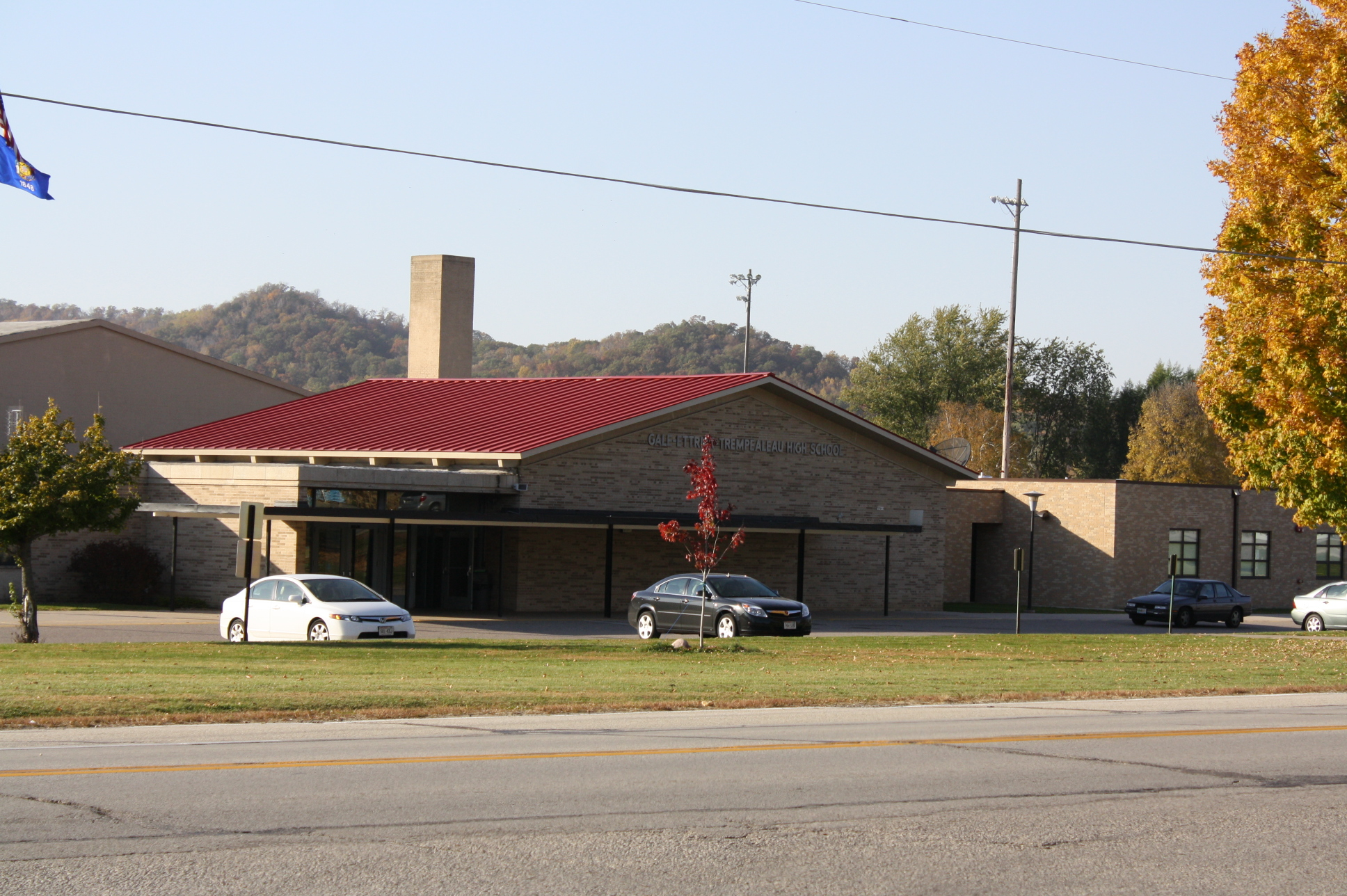
Gale-Ettrick-Trempealeau High School

As of the census of 2000, there were 521 people, 241 households, and 129 families living in the village. The population density was 798.0 people per square mile (309.5/km^{2}). There were 254 housing units at an average density of 389.0 per square mile (150.9/km^{2}). The racial makeup of the village was 98.66% White, 0.19% Black or African American, 0.19% Asian, and 0.96% from two or more races. 0.00% of the population were Hispanic or Latino of any race.

There were 241 households, out of which 27.0% had children under the age of 18 living with them, 40.2% were married couples living together, 10.0% had a female householder with no husband present, and 46.1% were non-families. 39.0% of all households were made up of individuals, and 21.2% had someone living alone who was 65 years of age or older. The average household size was 2.16 and the average family size was 2.95.

In the village, the population was spread out, with 22.5% under the age of 18, 9.0% from 18 to 24, 30.1% from 25 to 44, 17.1% from 45 to 64, and 21.3% who were 65 years of age or older. The median age was 38 years. For every 100 females, there were 86.1 males. For every 100 females age 18 and over, there were 88.8 males.

The median income for a household in the village was $34,250, and the median income for a family was $45,987. Males had a median income of $29,479 versus $19,375 for females. The per capita income for the village was $16,392. About 1.4% of families and 5.2% of the population were below the poverty threshold, including 5.2% of those under age 18 and 7.5% of those age 65 or over.

== Notable people ==
- Keith C. Hardie, member of Wisconsin State Assembly
