= Butman Corners, Wisconsin =

- Unincorporated community
- Location within Wisconsin Location within the United States
- Coordinates: 44°04′41″N 91°17′31″W
- Country: United States
- State: Wisconsin
- County: Trempealeau
- Elevation: 741 ft (226 m)
- Time zone: UTC-6 (Central (CST))
  - Summer (DST): UTC-5 (CDT)
- Area codes: 715 & 534
- GNIS feature ID: 1562471

Butman Corners is an unincorporated community located in the town of Gale, Trempealeau County, Wisconsin, United States. The community was named for Stark and Hiram Butman, who came from Ohio in the early 1850s.
