= Hegg, Wisconsin =

- Unincorporated community
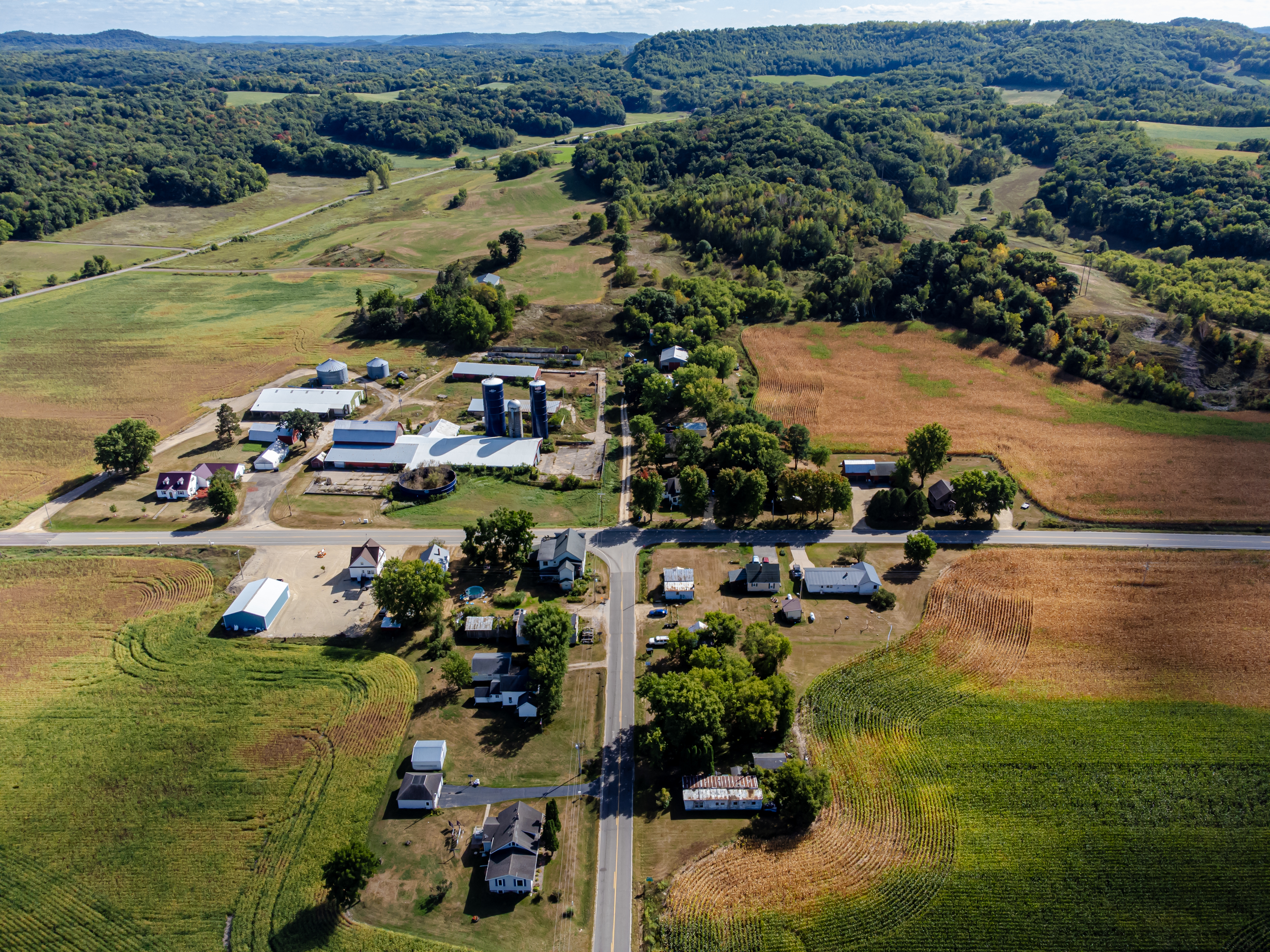
- County C and County S crossroads

- Location within Wisconsin Location within the United States
- Coordinates: 44°12′33″N 91°11′33″W
- Country: United States
- State: Wisconsin
- County: Trempealeau
- Elevation: 830 ft (250 m)
- Time zone: UTC-6 (Central (CST))
  - Summer (DST): UTC-5 (CDT)
- Area codes: 715 & 534
- GNIS feature ID: 1566263

Hegg is an unincorporated community located in the town of Ettrick, Trempealeau County, Wisconsin, United States. The community was named for Hans Christian Heg [sic], an antislavery activist. The post office was established in August 1873 with Knud Hallenger as postmaster.

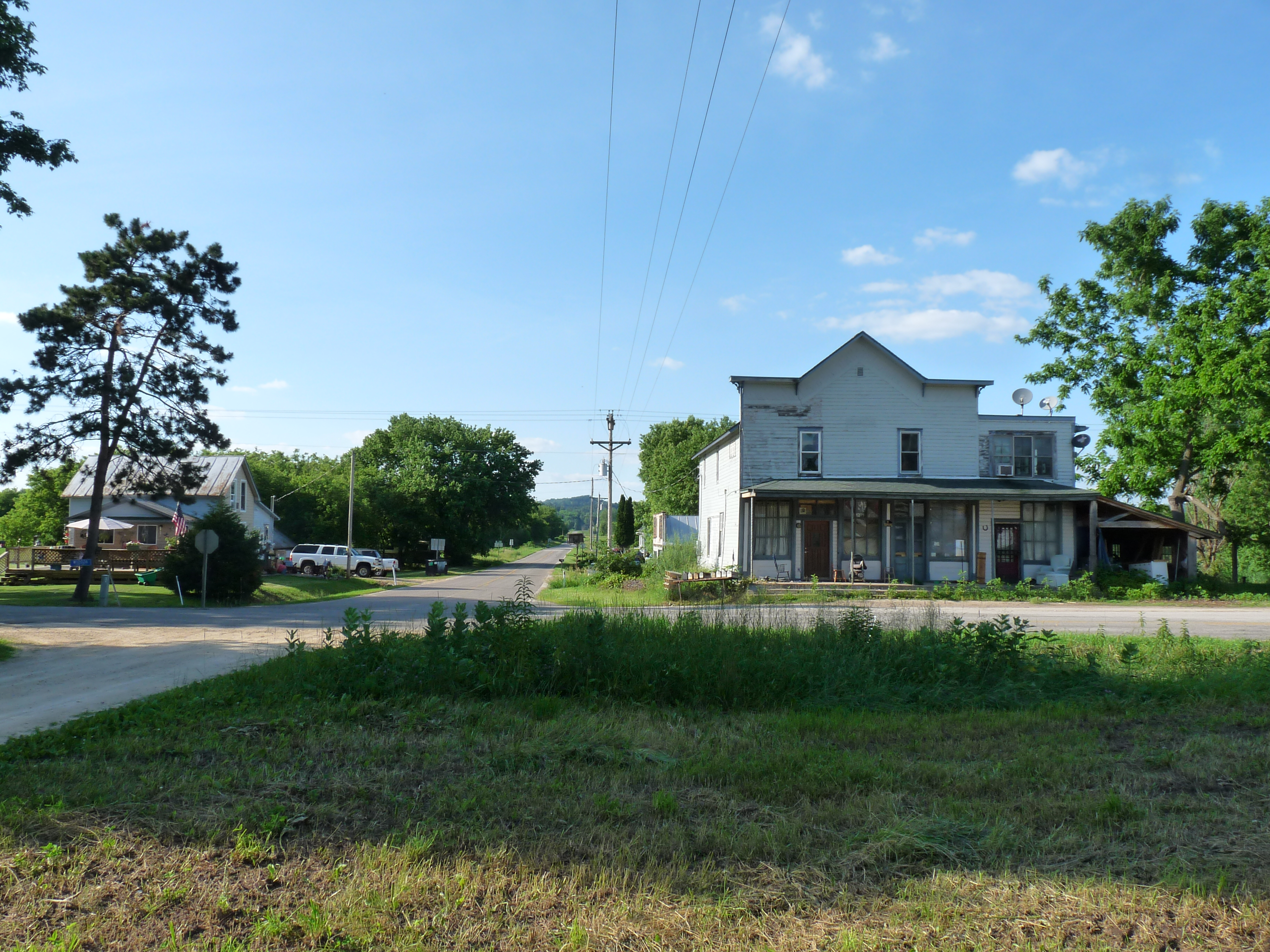
