= Ettrick (town), Wisconsin =

Ettrick, Wisconsin
- Town
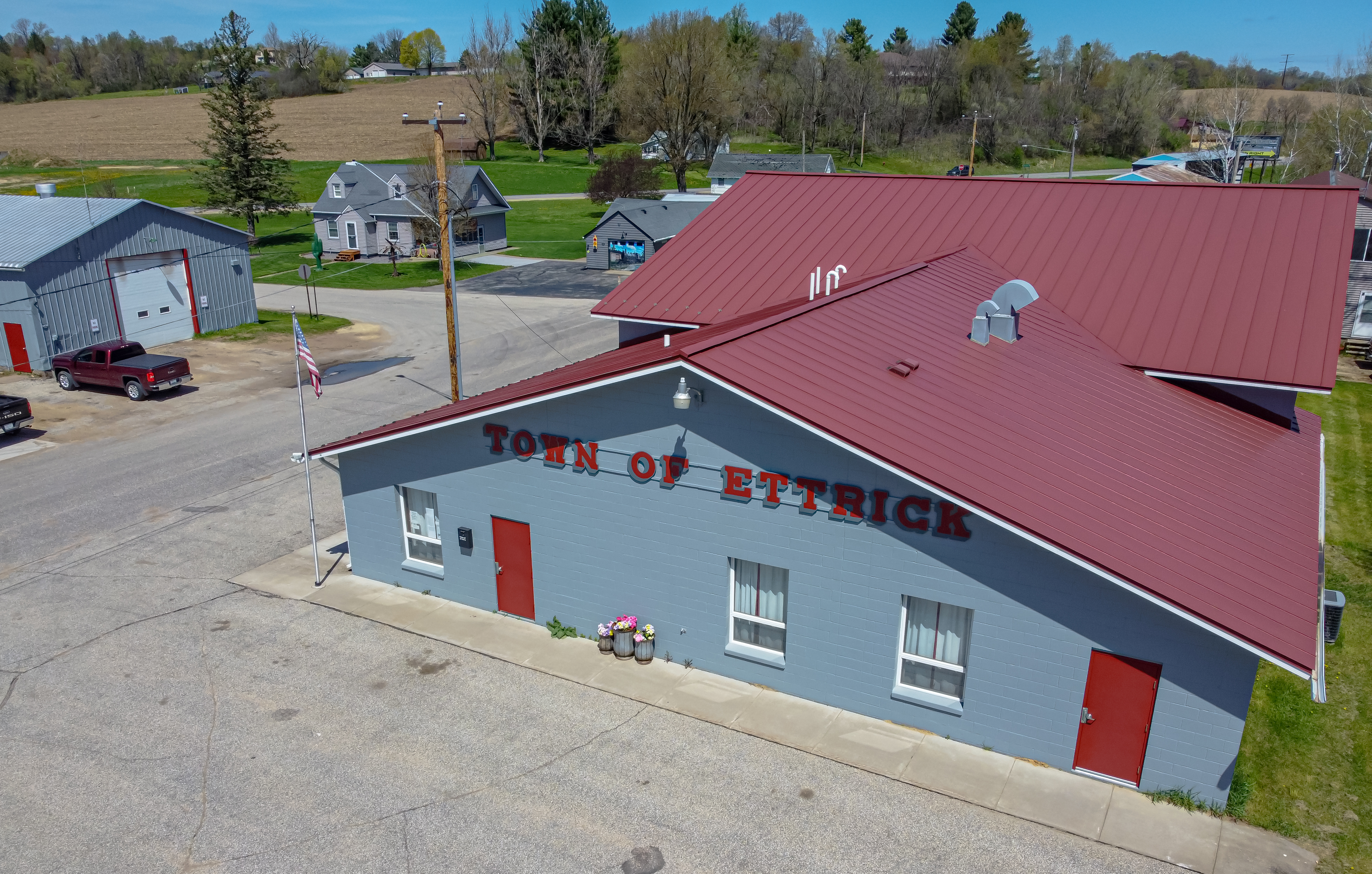
- Ettrick Town Hall

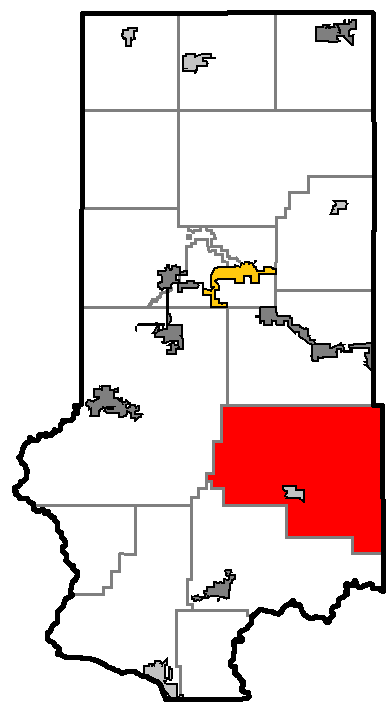
- Location of Ettrick, Trempealeau County

- Location of Trempealeau County, Wisconsin
- Coordinates: 44°11′28″N 91°14′58″W
- Country: United States
- State: Wisconsin
- County: Trempealeau

Area
  - Total: 77.1 sq mi (199.6 km^{2})
  - Land: 77.1 sq mi (199.6 km^{2})
  - Water: 0 sq mi (0.0 km^{2})
- Elevation: 791 ft (241 m)

Population (2020)
  - Total: 1,285
  - Density: 16.67/sq mi (6.438/km^{2})
- Time zone: UTC-6 (Central (CST))
  - Summer (DST): UTC-5 (CDT)
- Area code: 608
- FIPS code: 55-24425
- GNIS feature ID: 1583175
- Website: http://townofettrickwi.com/

Ettrick is a town in Trempealeau County, Wisconsin, United States. The population was 1,285 at the time of the 2020 census. The town surrounds the village of Ettrick. The unincorporated communities of Beaches Corners, Chapultepee, Hegg, Iduna, and Upper French Creek are also located in the town.

== Geography ==
According to the United States Census Bureau, the town has a total area of 77.1 square miles (199.6 km^{2}), all land.

== Demographics ==
As of the census of 2000, there were 1,284 people, 488 households, and 375 families residing in the town. The population density was 16.7 people per square mile (6.4/km^{2}). There were 526 housing units at an average density of 6.8 per square mile (2.6/km^{2}). The racial makeup of the town was 99.45% White, 0.08% Black or African American, 0.08% Asian, 0.08% Pacific Islander, 0.23% from other races, and 0.08% from two or more races. 0.62% of the population were Hispanic or Latino of any race.

There were 488 households, out of which 33.2% had children under the age of 18 living with them, 68.2% were married couples living together, 3.9% had a female householder with no husband present, and 23.0% were non-families. 16.2% of all households were made up of individuals, and 5.9% had someone living alone who was 65 years of age or older. The average household size was 2.63 and the average family size was 2.92.

In the town, the population was 24.7% under the age of 18, 6.5% from 18 to 24, 25.7% from 25 to 44, 31.1% from 45 to 64, and 12.0% who were 65 years of age or older. The median age was 40 years. For every 100 females, there were 105.8 males. For every 100 females age 18 and over, there were 106.2 males.

The median income for a household in the town was $41,625, and the median income for a family was $43,214. Males had a median income of $28,500 versus $20,382 for females. The per capita income for the town was $18,593. About 2.5% of families and 3.9% of the population were below the poverty line, including 0.7% of those under age 18 and 4.4% of those age 65 or over.

== Notable people ==
- Robert Cance, Wisconsin state representative, lived in the town
- Albert Twesme, Wisconsin state representative, was born in the town
