= Trempealeau County, Wisconsin =

County in Wisconsin, United States

- County
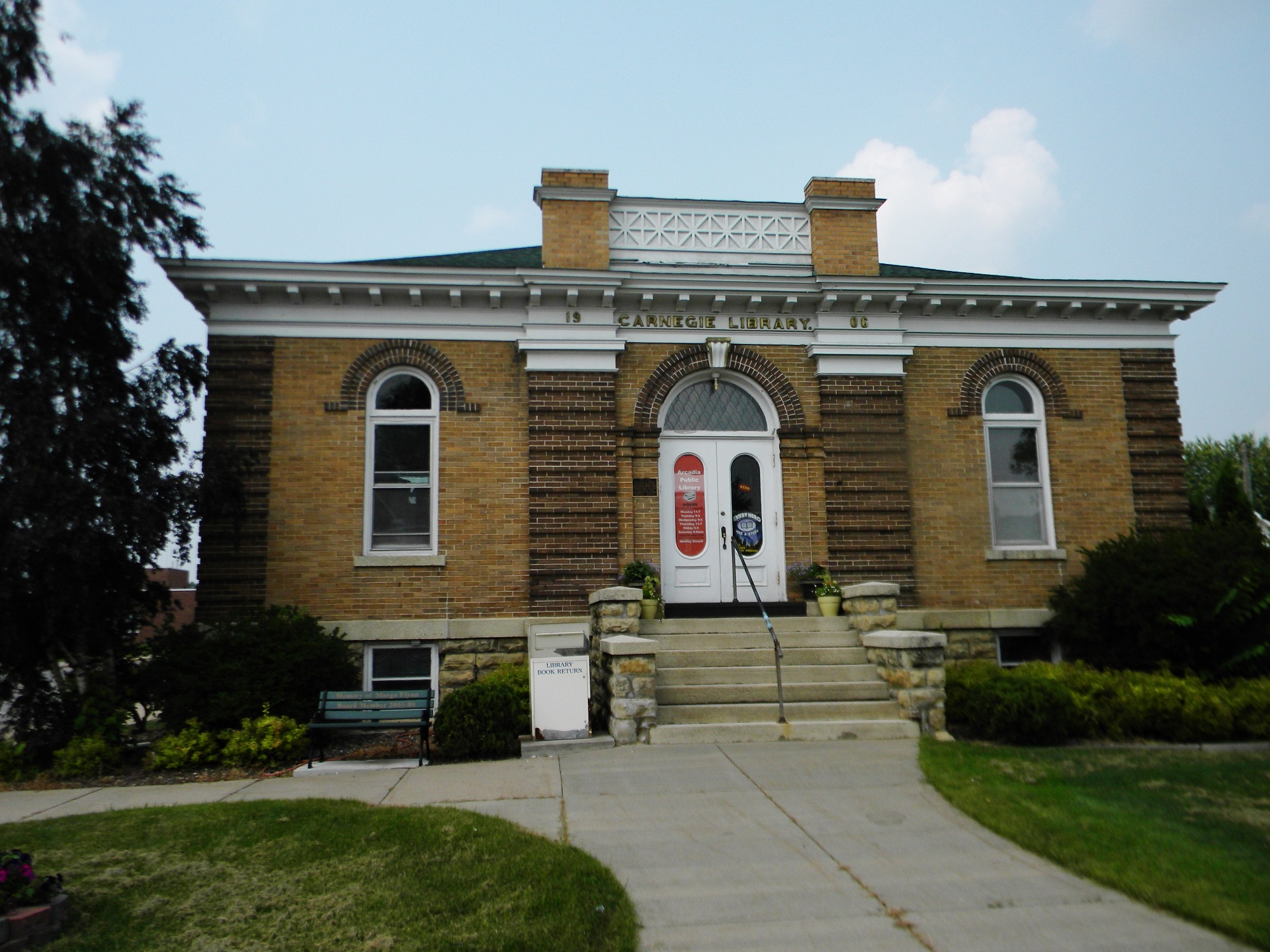
- Carnegie library in Arcadia, Wisconsin.

- Location within the U.S. state of Wisconsin
- Coordinates: 44°18′N 91°21′W
- Country: United States
- State: Wisconsin
- Founded: 1855
- Named for: Trempealeau River
- Seat: Whitehall
- Largest city: Arcadia

Area
  - Total: 742 sq mi (1,920 km^{2})
  - Land: 733 sq mi (1,900 km^{2})
  - Water: 9.0 sq mi (23 km^{2}) 1.2%

Population (2020)
  - Total: 30,760
  - Estimate (2025): 31,171 ▲
  - Density: 42.0/sq mi (16.2/km^{2})
- Time zone: UTC−6 (Central)
  - Summer (DST): UTC−5 (CDT)
- Congressional district: 3rd
- Website: co.trempealeau.wi.us

Trempealeau County (/ˈtrɛmpəloʊ/ TREM-pə-loh) is a county in the U.S. state of Wisconsin. As of the 2020 census, the population was 30,760. Its county seat is Whitehall.

== History ==
Patches of woodland are all that remain of the brush and light forest that once covered the county. In ancient times, the woodlands contained a great deal of timber, but Native Americans burned them periodically to encourage the growth of berries. They did little cultivation and had been almost completely removed from the area by 1837. The area was ceded by the Dakota in the 1837 Treaty of Washington (7 Stat. 538).

French fur traders were the first Europeans to enter this land, traveling by river across the county. At the mouth of the Trempealeau River at its confluence with the Mississippi River, they found a bluff surrounded by water and called it La Montagne qui trempe à l’eau ("mountain steeped in water"). It is now known as Trempealeau Mountain. The name was later shortened to Trempealeau. Created in 1854 and organized in 1855, the county is named after the river.

During the 19th and 20th century large numbers of Norwegian immigrants settled in the area in pursuit of cheap land, a better life and more opportunities. Much of the population is still of Norwegian descent and celebrate their ancestry by making foods native to Norway and participating in Norwegian Constitution Day events.

In the late 1850s, Trempealeau became a destination for Polish Prussian settlers from Upper Silesia seeking to escape German persecution and poverty in their homeland. They built churches, schools, and communities to develop what became the nation's second-largest Polish settlement. Their settlements were especially focused around Independence, Arcadia, Whitehall, and Pine Creek. Trempealeau has a large population of Silesian Polish descent to this day.

The county again became an immigrant destination in the first decades of the 21st century, gaining a significant Hispanic and Latino population.

== Geography ==
According to the U.S. Census Bureau, the county has an area of 742 square miles (1,920 km^{2}), of which 733 square miles (1,900 km^{2}) is land and 9.0 square miles (23 km^{2}) (1.2%) is water. It is part of the Driftless Zone.

=== Adjacent counties ===
- Buffalo County – west
- Eau Claire County – north
- Jackson County – east
- La Crosse County – southeast
- Winona County, Minnesota – southwest

=== Major highways ===
- Interstate 94
- U.S. Highway 10
- U.S. Highway 53
- Highway 35 (Wisconsin)
- Highway 54 (Wisconsin)
- Highway 93 (Wisconsin)
- Highway 95 (Wisconsin)
- Highway 121 (Wisconsin)

=== Railroads ===
- BNSF
- Canadian National

=== National protected areas ===
- Trempealeau National Wildlife Refuge (part)
- Upper Mississippi River National Wildlife and Fish Refuge (part)

== Demographics ==
Historical population
| Census | Pop. | Note | %± |
|---|---|---|---|
| 1860 | 2,560 | | — |
| 1870 | 10,732 | | 319.2% |
| 1880 | 17,189 | | 60.2% |
| 1890 | 18,920 | | 10.1% |
| 1900 | 23,114 | | 22.2% |
| 1910 | 22,928 | | −0.8% |
| 1920 | 24,506 | | 6.9% |
| 1930 | 23,910 | | −2.4% |
| 1940 | 24,381 | | 2.0% |
| 1950 | 23,730 | | −2.7% |
| 1960 | 23,377 | | −1.5% |
| 1970 | 23,344 | | −0.1% |
| 1980 | 26,158 | | 12.1% |
| 1990 | 25,263 | | −3.4% |
| 2000 | 27,010 | | 6.9% |
| 2010 | 28,816 | | 6.7% |
| 2020 | 30,760 | | 6.7% |
| 2025 (est.) | 31,171 | ▲ | 1.3% |
U.S. Decennial Census; 1790–1960 1900–1990; 1990–2000 2010–2020 2020 census

=== Racial and ethnic composition ===
Trempealeau County, Wisconsin – Racial and ethnic composition Note: the US Census treats Hispanic/Latino as an ethnic category. This table excludes Latinos from the racial categories and assigns them to a separate category. Hispanics/Latinos may be of any race.
| Race / ethnicity (NH = Non-Hispanic) | Pop 1980 | Pop 1990 | Pop 2000 | Pop 2010 | Pop 2020 | % 1980 | % 1990 | % 2000 | % 2010 | % 2020 |
|---|---|---|---|---|---|---|---|---|---|---|
| White alone (NH) | 25,982 | 25,120 | 26,546 | 26,774 | 25,830 | 99.33% | 99.43% | 98.28% | 92.91% | 83.97% |
| Black or African American alone (NH) | 6 | 12 | 33 | 54 | 81 | 0.02% | 0.05% | 0.12% | 0.19% | 0.26% |
| Native American or Alaska Native alone (NH) | 21 | 32 | 40 | 49 | 82 | 0.08% | 0.13% | 0.15% | 0.17% | 0.27% |
| Asian alone (NH) | 27 | 46 | 36 | 119 | 109 | 0.10% | 0.18% | 0.13% | 0.41% | 0.35% |
| Native Hawaiian or Pacific Islander alone (NH) | x | x | 2 | 2 | 0 | x | x | 0.01% | 0.01% | 0.00% |
| Other race alone (NH) | 17 | 0 | 5 | 9 | 52 | 0.06% | 0.00% | 0.02% | 0.03% | 0.17% |
| Mixed race or Multiracial (NH) | x | x | 108 | 142 | 649 | x | x | 0.40% | 0.49% | 2.11% |
| Hispanic or Latino (any race) | 105 | 53 | 240 | 1,667 | 3,957 | 0.40% | 0.21% | 0.89% | 5.78% | 12.86% |
| Total | 26,158 | 25,263 | 27,010 | 28,816 | 30,760 | 100.00% | 100.00% | 100.00% | 100.00% | 100.00% |

=== 2020 census ===
As of the 2020 census, the county had a population of 30,760, for a population density of 42.0 peopleper square mile (16.2 people/km^{2}). There were 13,270 housing units at an average density of 18.1 unitsper square mile (7.0 units/km^{2}).

The median age was 40.1 years; 24.7% of residents were under the age of 18 and 18.4% were 65 years of age or older. For every 100 females there were 104.3 males, and for every 100 females age 18 and over there were 104.5 males.

The racial makeup of the county was 85.5% White, 0.3% Black or African American, 1.2% American Indian and Alaska Native, 0.4% Asian, <0.1% Native Hawaiian and Pacific Islander, 7.9% from some other race, and 4.7% from two or more races. Hispanic or Latino residents of any race comprised 12.9% of the population.

<0.1% of residents lived in urban areas, while 100.0% lived in rural areas.

There were 12,219 households in the county, of which 30.3% had children under the age of 18 living in them. Of all households, 50.9% were married-couple households, 19.5% were households with a male householder and no spouse or partner present, and 20.1% were households with a female householder and no spouse or partner present. About 27.4% of all households were made up of individuals and 12.6% had someone living alone who was 65 years of age or older. There were 13,270 housing units, of which 7.9% were vacant. Among occupied housing units, 72.4% were owner-occupied and 27.6% were renter-occupied. The homeowner vacancy rate was 1.0% and the rental vacancy rate was 7.7%.

2000 Census Age Pyramid for Trempealeau County

=== 2000 census ===
As of the census of 2000, there were 27,010 people, 10,747 households, and 7,243 families residing in the county. The population density was 37 people per square mile (14 people/km^{2}). There were 11,482 housing units at an average density of 16 units per square mile (6.2 units/km^{2}). The racial makeup of the county was 98.81% White, 0.13% Black or African American, 0.17% Native American, 0.13% Asian, 0.01% Pacific Islander, 0.29% from other races, and 0.47% from two or more races. 0.89% of the population were Hispanic or Latino of any race. 43.5% were of Norwegian, 24.6% German and 17.0% Polish ancestry. 94.9% spoke English, 1.6% Norwegian and 1.6% Spanish as their first language.

There were 10,747 households, out of which 31.80% had children under the age of 18 living with them, 55.20% were married couples living together, 7.40% had a female householder with no husband present, and 32.60% were non-families. 27.60% of all households were made up of individuals, and 13.50% had someone living alone who was 65 years of age or older. The average household size was 2.45 and the average family size was 3.00.

In the county, the population was spread out, with 25.30% under the age of 18, 6.90% from 18 to 24, 28.20% from 25 to 44, 23.10% from 45 to 64, and 16.40% who were 65 years of age or older. The median age was 38 years. For every 100 females there were 100.30 males. For every 100 females age 18 and over, there were 98.80 males.

In 2017, there were 450 births, giving a general fertility rate of 93.1 births per 1000 women aged 15–44, the third highest rate out of all 72 Wisconsin counties.

== Gallery ==
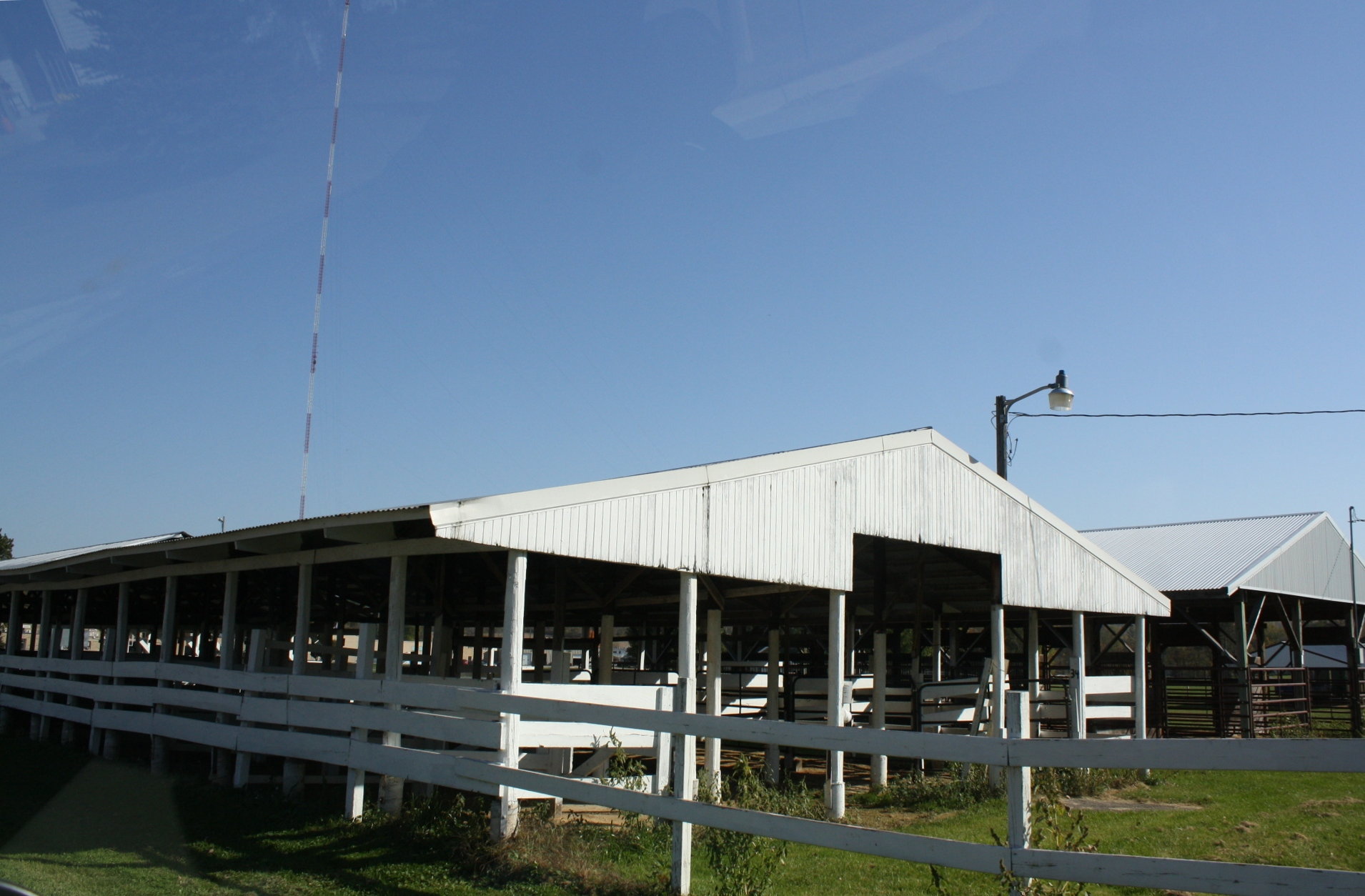
Fairgrounds in Galesville

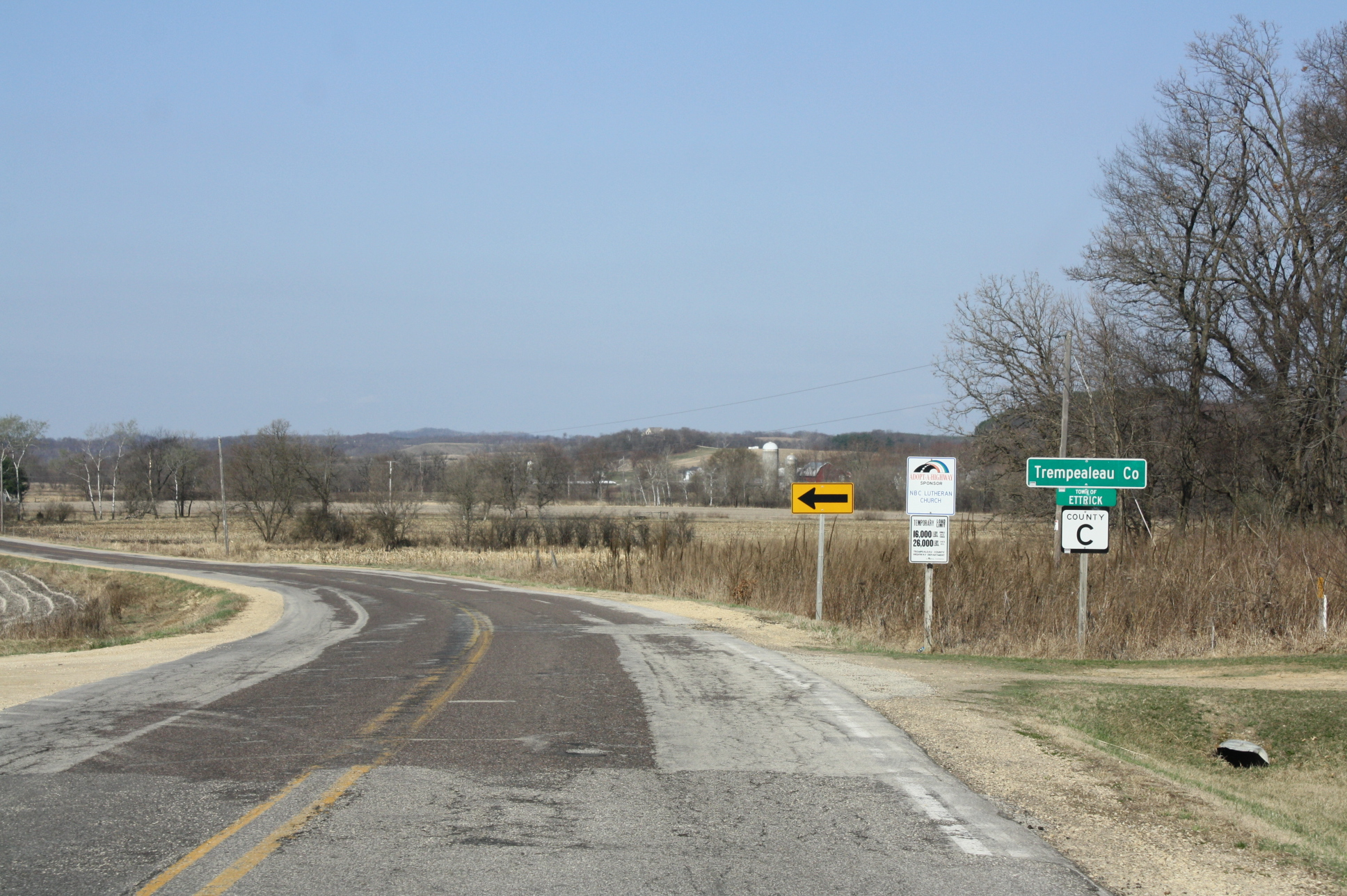
Entrance sign to Trempealeau County in the Town of Ettrick

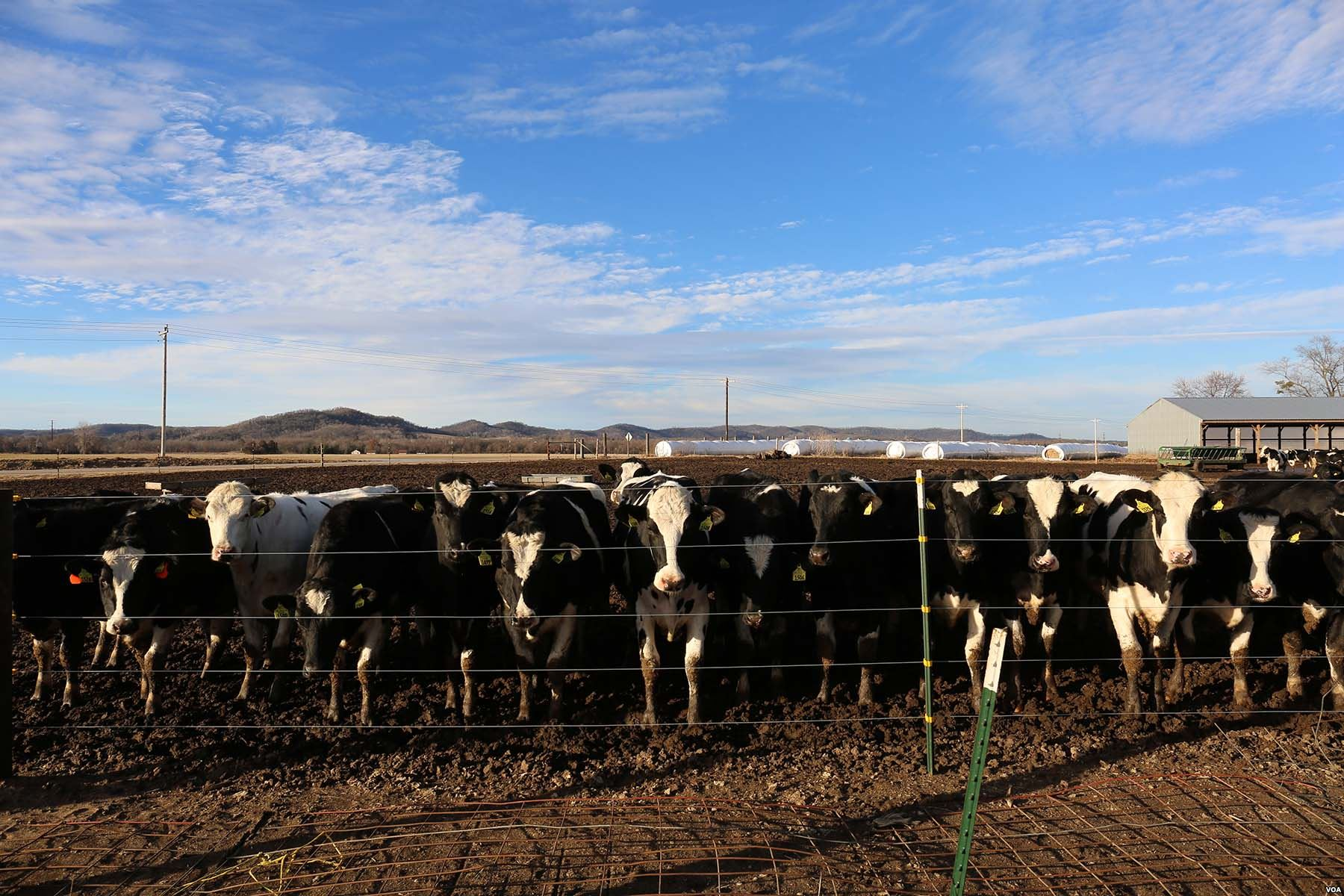
The Cow Farm, Trempealeau County

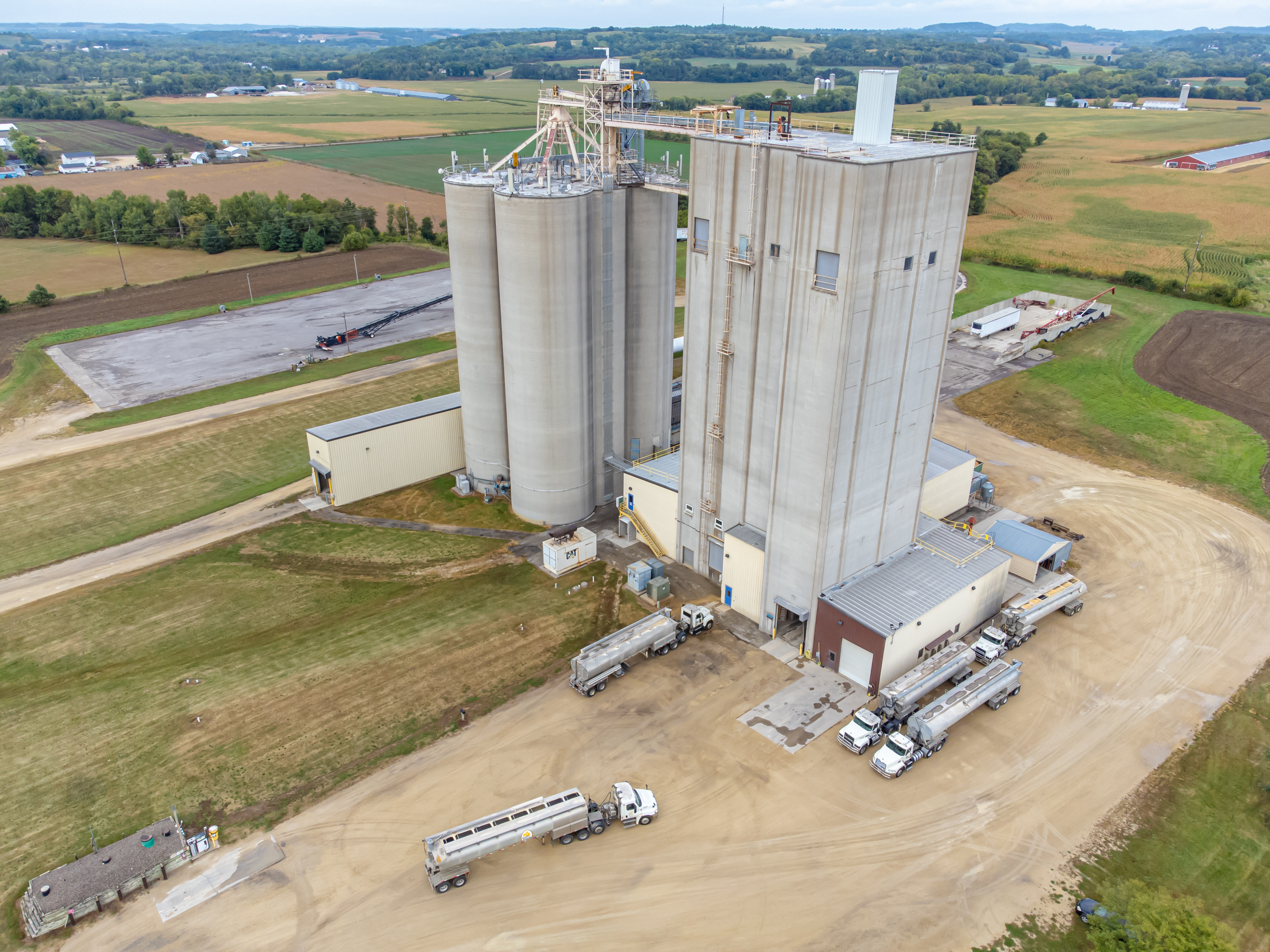
Gold'n Plump-Pilgrim's Pride Poultry Feed Mill

== Communities ==
=== Cities ===
- Arcadia
- Blair
- Galesville
- Independence
- Osseo
- Whitehall (county seat)

=== Villages ===
- Eleva
- Ettrick
- Pigeon Falls
- Strum
- Trempealeau

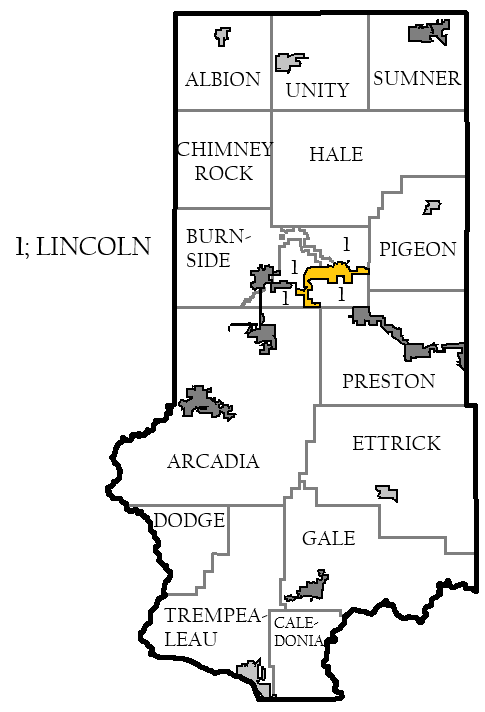
Towns of Trempealeau County

=== Towns ===
- Albion
- Arcadia
- Burnside
- Caledonia
- Chimney Rock
- Dodge
- Ettrick
- Gale
- Hale
- Lincoln
- Pigeon
- Preston
- Sumner
- Trempealeau
- Unity

=== Census-designated place ===
- Dodge

=== Unincorporated communities ===
- Beaches Corners
- Butman Corners
- Chapultepee
- Centerville
- Coral City
- Dewey Corners
- Elk Creek
- Frenchville
- Hale
- Hegg
- Iduna
- North Creek
- Pine Creek
- Pleasantville
- Russell
- Tamarack
- Upper French Creek
- West Prairie
- Wrights Corners

=== Ghost towns/neighborhoods ===
- Cortland
- New City
- Williamsburg

== Politics ==
Between 1948 and 1984, Trempealeau County voted for the nationwide winner in every election with the exception of the very close 1960 election. Then, from 1988 to 2012, like most of the rural counties in southwestern Wisconsin, it backed the Democratic candidate in each election, and did so by more than a 10% margin each time. In 2016, once again like the rest of rural southwestern Wisconsin, Trempealeau County dramatically swung to the right, shifting from a 14% victory for Democrat Barack Obama in 2012 to a 13% victory for Republican Donald Trump in 2016. Trump further expanded his margin of victory to over 16% in 2020 and to over 21% in 2024, achieving the highest vote shares for a Republican in the county since Dwight D. Eisenhower in his 1952 landslide victory.

United States presidential election results for Trempealeau County, Wisconsin
| Year | Republican | | Democratic | | Third party(ies) | |
| Year | No. | % | No. | % | No. | % |
|---|---|---|---|---|---|---|
| 1892 | 2,116 | 53.54% | 1,521 | 38.49% | 315 | 7.97% |
| 1896 | 3,306 | 67.66% | 1,394 | 28.53% | 186 | 3.81% |
| 1900 | 3,364 | 71.23% | 1,190 | 25.20% | 169 | 3.58% |
| 1904 | 3,560 | 75.54% | 981 | 20.81% | 172 | 3.65% |
| 1908 | 3,733 | 75.31% | 1,085 | 21.89% | 139 | 2.80% |
| 1912 | 1,763 | 44.66% | 1,235 | 31.28% | 950 | 24.06% |
| 1916 | 2,138 | 56.04% | 1,578 | 41.36% | 99 | 2.60% |
| 1920 | 4,748 | 84.24% | 718 | 12.74% | 170 | 3.02% |
| 1924 | 2,083 | 31.26% | 373 | 5.60% | 4,208 | 63.15% |
| 1928 | 5,596 | 64.97% | 2,963 | 34.40% | 54 | 0.63% |
| 1932 | 2,874 | 32.81% | 5,786 | 66.06% | 99 | 1.13% |
| 1936 | 3,339 | 33.96% | 5,929 | 60.30% | 564 | 5.74% |
| 1940 | 5,319 | 50.28% | 5,175 | 48.92% | 85 | 0.80% |
| 1944 | 4,719 | 51.06% | 4,496 | 48.65% | 27 | 0.29% |
| 1948 | 3,650 | 43.13% | 4,711 | 55.67% | 102 | 1.21% |
| 1952 | 6,501 | 61.63% | 4,021 | 38.12% | 26 | 0.25% |
| 1956 | 5,476 | 54.25% | 4,602 | 45.59% | 16 | 0.16% |
| 1960 | 5,539 | 51.38% | 5,223 | 48.45% | 19 | 0.18% |
| 1964 | 3,264 | 34.04% | 6,320 | 65.91% | 5 | 0.05% |
| 1968 | 4,861 | 50.69% | 3,971 | 41.41% | 757 | 7.89% |
| 1972 | 5,723 | 56.69% | 4,232 | 41.92% | 140 | 1.39% |
| 1976 | 5,341 | 45.56% | 6,218 | 53.05% | 163 | 1.39% |
| 1980 | 5,992 | 49.52% | 5,390 | 44.54% | 719 | 5.94% |
| 1984 | 6,008 | 52.24% | 5,407 | 47.02% | 85 | 0.74% |
| 1988 | 4,902 | 43.87% | 6,212 | 55.59% | 61 | 0.55% |
| 1992 | 3,577 | 27.49% | 6,218 | 47.79% | 3,217 | 24.72% |
| 1996 | 3,035 | 28.12% | 5,848 | 54.18% | 1,911 | 17.70% |
| 2000 | 5,002 | 41.11% | 6,678 | 54.88% | 488 | 4.01% |
| 2004 | 5,878 | 41.80% | 8,075 | 57.42% | 109 | 0.78% |
| 2008 | 4,808 | 36.11% | 8,321 | 62.50% | 185 | 1.39% |
| 2012 | 5,707 | 42.33% | 7,605 | 56.41% | 169 | 1.25% |
| 2016 | 7,366 | 53.82% | 5,636 | 41.18% | 685 | 5.00% |
| 2020 | 8,833 | 57.43% | 6,285 | 40.86% | 262 | 1.70% |
| 2024 | 9,661 | 60.08% | 6,219 | 38.68% | 199 | 1.24% |

== See also ==
- National Register of Historic Places listings in Trempealeau County, Wisconsin
