= U.S. Route 12 in Wisconsin =

Section of U.S. Highway in Wisconsin

U.S. Highway 12
- Iron Brigade Memorial Highway
- US 12 highlighted in red, existing business routes highlighted in blue

Route information
- Maintained by WisDOT
- Length: 339.40 mi (546.21 km)
- Existed: 1926–present
- History: Designated in 1917 as WIS 12

Major junctions
- West end: I-94 / US 12 in Hudson
- I-90 / I-94 in multiple locations; US 63 in Baldwin; US 53 in Altoona; US 10 in Cleveland/Mentor; US 14 in Middleton; US 18 / US 151 in Madison; US 51 in Madison; I-39 / I-90 in Madison; US 18 in Cambridge; I-43 in Elkhorn
- East end: US 12 in Genoa City

Location
- Country: United States
- State: Wisconsin
- Counties: St. Croix, Dunn, Chippewa, Eau Claire, Clark, Jackson, Monroe, Juneau, Sauk, Dane, Jefferson, Rock, Walworth

Highway system
- United States Numbered Highway System; List; Special; Divided; Wisconsin State Trunk Highway System; Interstate; US; State; Scenic; Rustic
← WIS 11	→ WIS 13

U.S. Highway 12 (US 12 or Highway 12) in the U.S. state of Wisconsin runs east–west across the western to southeast portions of the state. It enters from Minnesota running concurrently with Interstate 94 (I-94) at Hudson, parallels the Interstate to Wisconsin Dells, and provides local access to cities such as Menomonie, Eau Claire, Black River Falls, Tomah, and Mauston. It then provides an alternative route for traffic between northwestern Wisconsin and Madison and is the anchor route for the Beltline Highway around Madison. Finally, it serves southeastern Wisconsin, connecting Madison with Fort Atkinson, Whitewater, Elkhorn, and Lake Geneva. The West Beltline Highway and the segment between Elkhorn and Genoa City are freeways, and the segment between Sauk City and Middleton is an expressway. The remainder of the road is a two-lane surface road or an urban multilane arterial. Between Hudson and west of Warrens, the road closely parallels the former main line of the Chicago, St. Paul, Minneapolis and Omaha Railway, now operated by Union Pacific Railroad.

== Route description ==
=== Hudson to Lake Delton ===
US 12 crosses the St. Croix River from Minnesota concurrent with I-94 into St. Croix County. Wisconsin Highway 35 (WIS 35) joins both routes upon their entry into Wisconsin and exits south three miles (4.8 km) east. US 12 leaves I-94 one mile (1.6 km) further east from the eastern WIS 35 exit, treks two miles (3.2 km) north, and parallels the Interstate. The highway crosses WIS 65 in Roberts and passes through Hammond over a 15-mile (24 km) segment to Baldwin, where it crosses US 63. US 12 passes through Woodville four miles (6.4 km) east of Baldwin and crosses WIS 128 in Wilson, two miles (3.2 km) west of the Dunn County line. Roughly three miles (4.8 km) into Dunn County, US 12 passes through Knapp then turns southeastward, connecting with WIS 79 six miles (9.7 km) further; it then joins WIS 25 (North Broadway Street) to the south in Menomonie. US 12 turns east onto WIS 29 (Main Street East) in downtown Menomonie, and the two routes follow Stout Road east out of the city. The highways meet an interchange with I-94, then split one half of a mile (0.80 km) east in Elk Mound at the junction with WIS 40. US 12 passes through Elk Mound and enters Eau Claire County.

US 12 merges with WIS 312 east (North Crossing) for two miles (3.2 km) before turning south onto Clairemont Avenue, bypassing downtown Eau Claire to the south and west. WIS 37 joins with US 12 on the southwest side of the city. Access to WIS 93 is provided via US 53. The interchange between US 12 and US 53 in Altoona is Wisconsin's first single-point urban interchange. US 12 continues east out of the Eau Claire–Chippewa Falls metropolitan area and passes through Fall Creek, where it turns southeastward to join WIS 27 south in Augusta. The two highways briefly join US 10 on the Jackson County line in Fairchild. US 12 and WIS 27 turn southward and pass through Humbird in Clark County and into Jackson County.

US 12 and WIS 27 cross WIS 95 in Merrillan and WIS 54 in Black River Falls. US 12 and WIS 27 also split in Black River Falls. US 12 follows I-94 to the southeast past Millston and into Monroe County. The highway crosses I-94 (with no access) south of Kirby and junctions with WIS 21 on the north side of Tomah at an interchange with the Interstate. US 12 passes through Tomah and joins with WIS 16 on the south side at the junction with WIS 131 near Mill Bluff State Park. The highways continue paralleling I-90 and I-94 southeast and pass through Oakdale and into Juneau County.

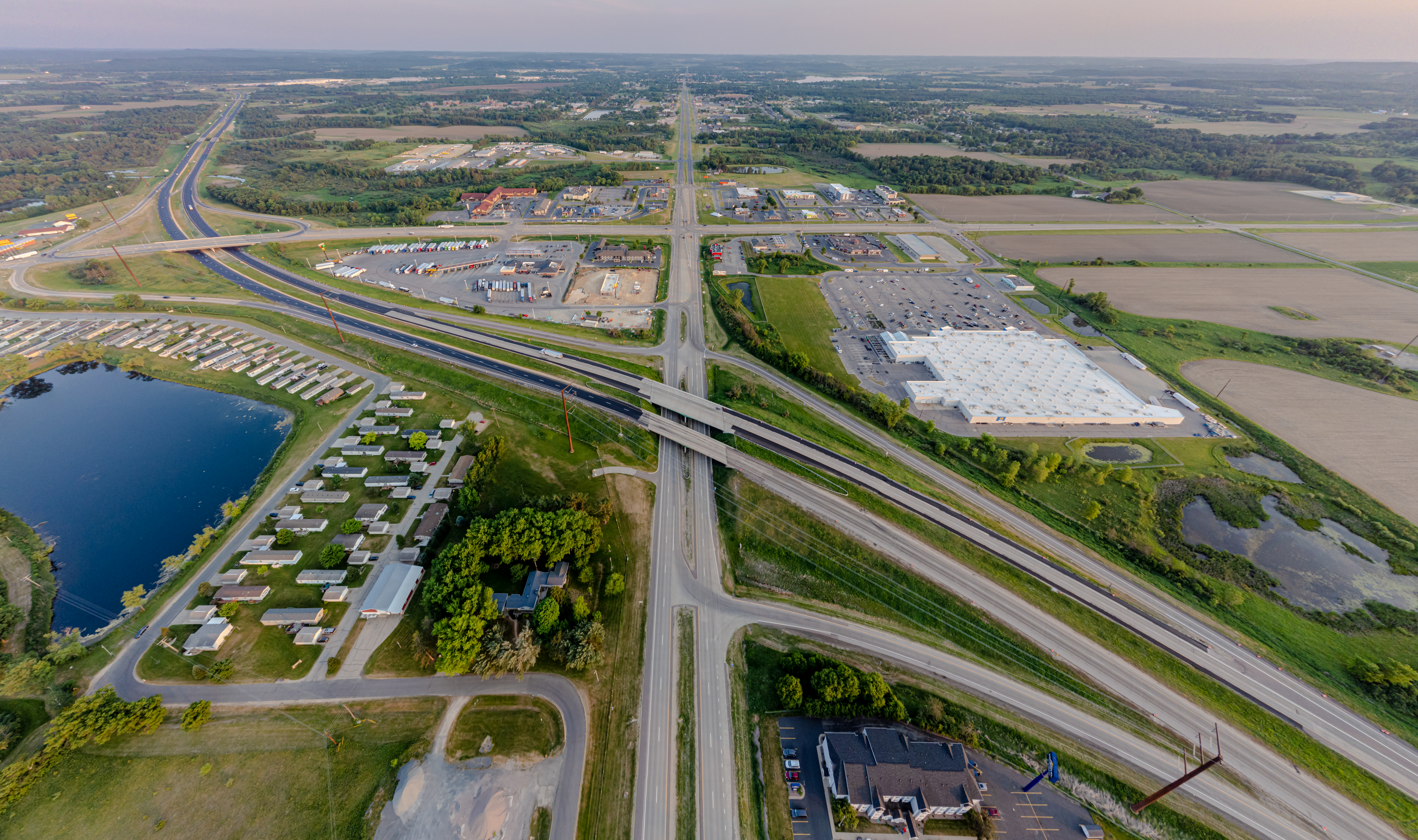
Tomah looking south from I-94

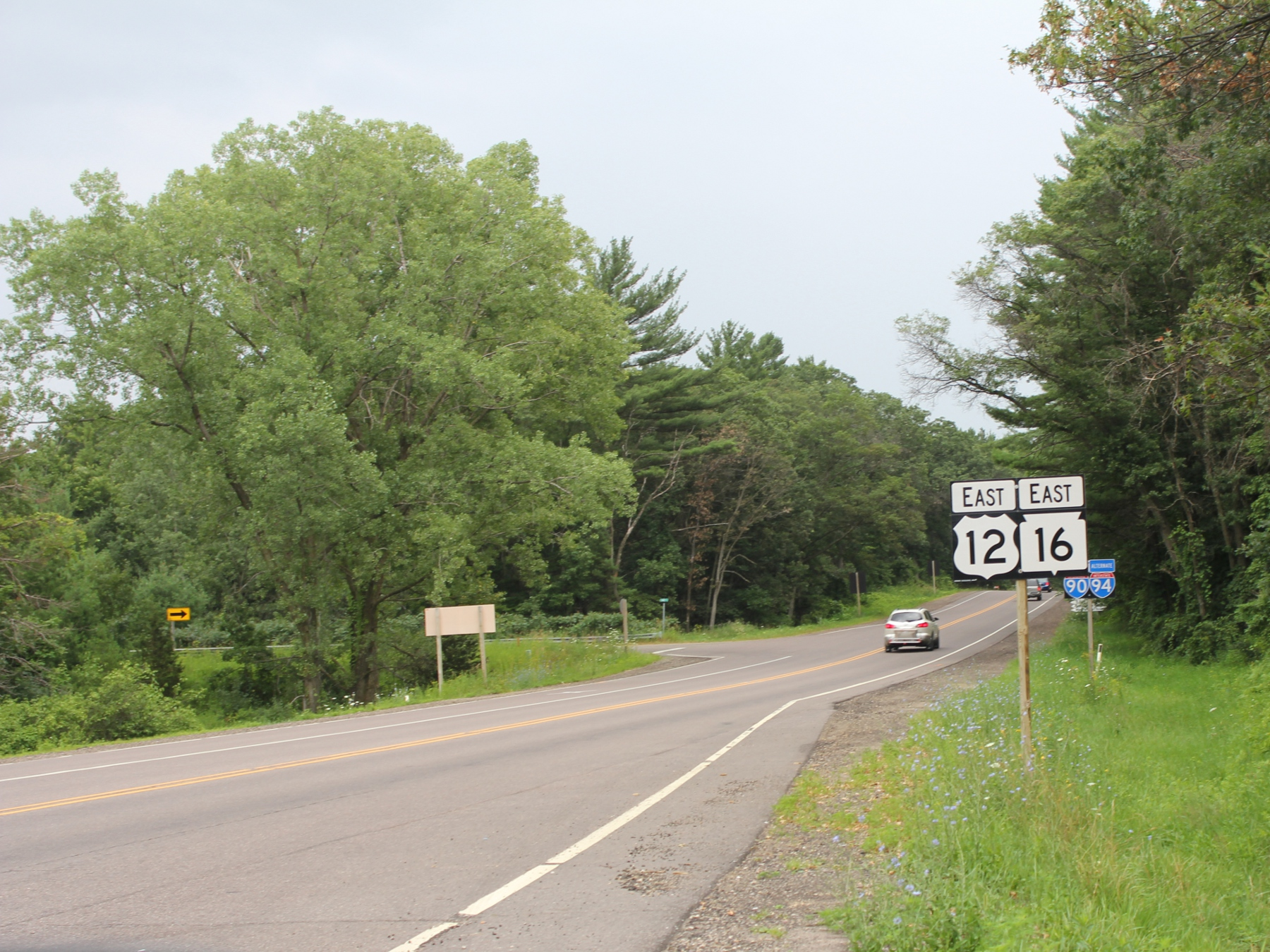
US 12 near Rocky Arbor State Park

US 12 and WIS 16 pass through Camp Douglas and cross WIS 80 in New Lisbon. The highways then junction with WIS 58 and WIS 82 in Mauston as they continue southeast. The routes trek eastward and pass through Lyndon Station, where Rocky Arbor State Park is located. The highways turn southeast again and cross the Interstates into Sauk County and Wisconsin Dells. WIS 16 turns east onto WIS 13 north as WIS 23 west turns south onto US 12. These highways follow the Wisconsin Dells Parkway south into the heart of the Wisconsin Dells tourism district, passing such attractions as Noah's Ark Water Park, the Wisconsin Ducks boat tours, Kalahari Resort, Mt. Olympus Water & Theme Park, Wilderness Territory, and Tommy Bartlett Show. WIS 23 turns west onto Monroe Avenue as US 12 turns southeast and crosses the Interstates.

=== Lake Delton to Cambridge ===
At the I-90/94 interchange, US 12 becomes a freeway that bypasses Baraboo that goes just south of the Grasser Road overpass. The highway becomes an expressway just north of Lehman Road and remains so until a few miles north of Sauk City. WIS 60 briefly joins US 12 in Sauk City and WIS 78 crosses the Wisconsin River concurrently with US 12 into Dane County. US 12 becomes an expressway again at the county line and continues southeast, crossing WIS 19 at Springfield Corners. Just northwest of Middleton, the route becomes a freeway as it enters the Madison area along the West Beltline Highway.

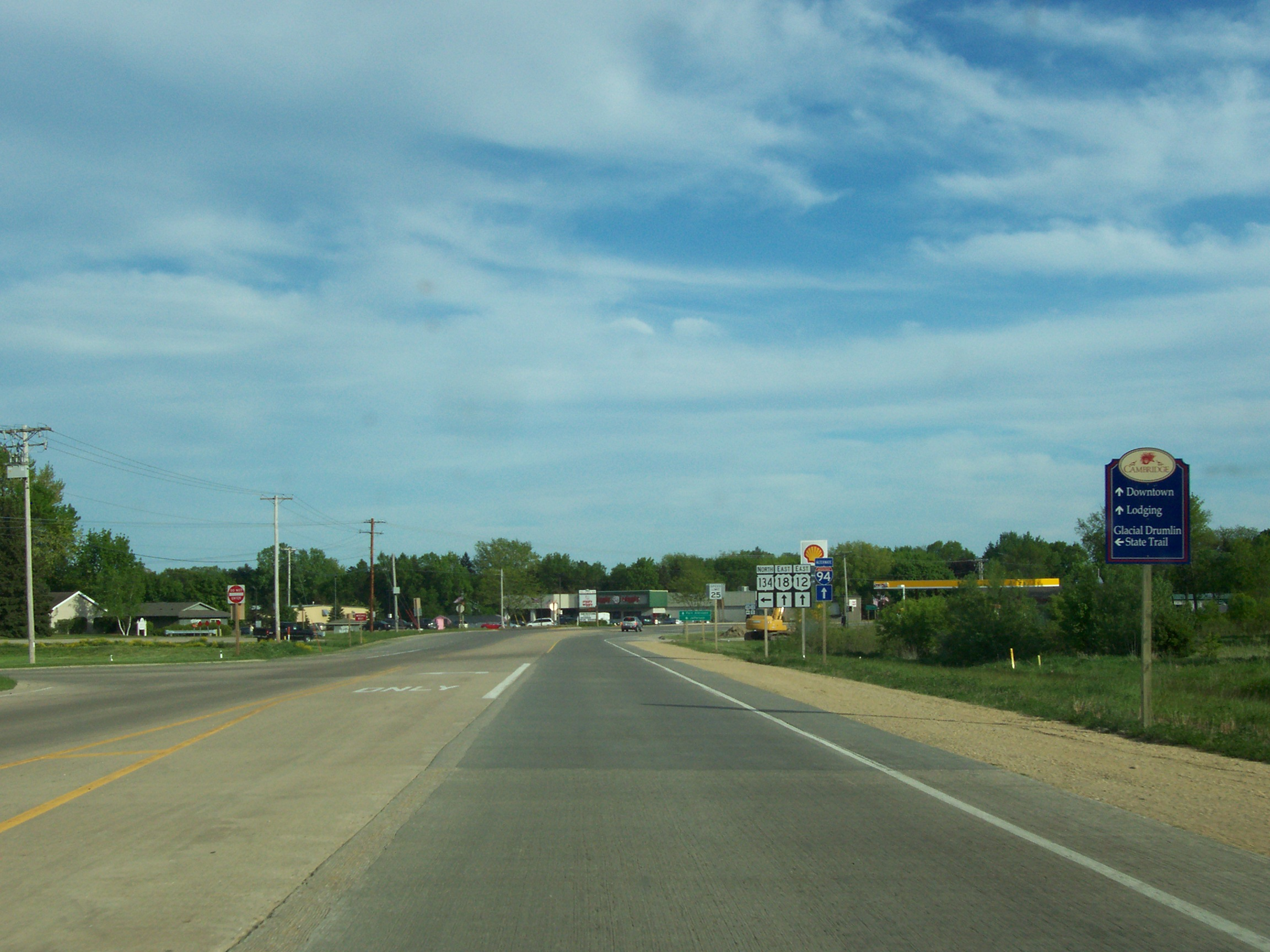
US 12/US 18 eastbound at southern terminus of WIS 134 in Cambridge

US 12 merges with US 14 at University Avenue. The freeway continues south and passes the interchanges of Greenway Blvd, Old Sauk Road, and Mineral Point Road (CTH-S). The freeway then turns eastward and passes the interchanges of Gammon Road, Whitney Way, and Verona Road/Midvale Blvd, where US 151 and US 18 join the freeway, creating a concurrency of four US Highways for a few miles. During the four-way concurrency, the freeway passes the interchange of Seminole Highway (only accessible from the westbound side), the University of Wisconsin–Madison Arboretum, and the interchanges of Todd Drive, Fish Hatchery Road (CTH-D), and Park Street, where US 14 leaves to go south and US 151 north into downtown Madison. US 12 and US 18 continue east into Monona and cross the Upper Mud Lake channel. The highways meet US 51 at Stoughton Road, then interchange with I-39 and I-90 on the southeast side of Madison. US 12 and US 18 continue as an expressway east of the Interstates, junctioning with WIS 73 in Deerfield and splitting, with US 12 turning southeast into Jefferson County in Cambridge.

=== Cambridge to Genoa City ===
After leaving Cambridge, US 12 passes through Oakland and crosses WIS 26, WIS 89, and WIS 106 in Fort Atkinson. WIS 89 joins US 12 as the route turns southward to approach Whitewater, bypassing the city to the south into Walworth County. The route briefly enters Rock County before crossing into Walworth County. WIS 89 turns off US 12 at its junction with WIS 59. WIS 59 East follows US 12 briefly before turning north into the city. US 12 passes through La Grange and turns south at the junction with WIS 20 to follow WIS 67 south. US 12 turns southeast off WIS 67 onto a freeway northeast of Elkhorn. The highway crosses over WIS 11 with no access (although access is provided via nearby I-43), then interchanges with I-43. Access for Lake Geneva is provided at WIS 120 and WIS 50 as US 12 passes the city to the east. The highway turns south into Genoa City, where the freeway ends and US 12 follows the crossroad into Illinois.

== History ==
State Trunk Highway 12
- Location: Hudson to Genoa City
- Existed: 1917–1926

The entire route was originally signed as WIS 12 in 1917 prior to the creation of the U.S. Numbered Highway System in 1926. Aside from changes resulting from the construction of freeways and US 12 being aligned on them, some differences exist between the original route and today's alignment. WIS 12 followed CTH-E, a more southerly alignment, between Menomonie and Eau Claire. From Black River Falls, WIS 12 continued south to Shamrock and turned east to follow CTH-O to Millston. WIS 12 ran southerly from Tomah along WIS 131 to CTH-A and turned east onto the county road to pass through Hustler and Clifton to reach New Lisbon.

The state originally planned to widen all of US 12 from Genoa City to Madison to freeway in anticipation of the Illinois Tollway building out a northwest toll road from Chicago to replace the original US 12 right of way. The plans were reeled back as WisDOT started widening between Elkhorn and Genoa City, as community and environmental opposition effectively shelved the planned toll expressway south of the border.

Despite that, WisDOT continued to re-route Cambridge and Whitewater to a direct and flatter roadbed. A two-lane bypass of Whitewater was added in 2005. Widening US 12 between Middleton and Sauk City was completed in 2005, but local opposition prevented most of the remaining route north of that point to Lake Delton from being constructed.

In Wisconsin, the highway was designated as the Iron Brigade Memorial Highway in 1993 to honor the Civil War Union Army unit; it also has this designation in Michigan, Indiana, and Illinois.

== Future ==
The portion of US 12 between Parmenter Street (the end of the Madison Beltline) to WIS 78/188 is being studied for future freeway conversion in two separate studies. Additionally, WisDOT has long range plans for freeway conversion between the Baraboo bypass and WIS 78/188, including a bypass of Sauk City, however, there is no timetable.

== Major intersections ==
County	Location	mi	km	Exit	Destinations	Notes
Washington	Lakeland	0.00	0.00		I-94 west / US 12 west – St. Paul	Continuation into Minnesota
St. Croix River		0.00	0.00	Minnesota–Wisconsin state line		
St. Croix	Hudson	0.3	0.48	1	WIS 35 north – Hudson	Western end of WIS 35 overlap
St. Croix	Hudson	1.9	3.1	2	CTH-F (Carmichael Road)	
St. Croix	Hudson	3.2	5.1	3	WIS 35 south – River Falls	Eastern end of WIS 35 overlap
St. Croix	Hudson	3.9	6.3	4	I-94 east – Eau Claire	Eastern end of I-94 overlap; western end of I-94 Alt.
St. Croix	Roberts	11.6	18.7		WIS 65 south – Roberts	Western end of WIS 65 overlap
St. Croix	Roberts	12.6	20.3		WIS 65 north – New Richmond	Eastern end of WIS 65 overlap
St. Croix	Baldwin	21.5	34.6		US 63 north – Turtle Lake	Northern end of US 63 overlap
St. Croix	Baldwin	22.1	35.6		US 63 south – Ellsworth	Southern end of US 63 overlap
St. Croix	Town of Springfield	31.0	49.9		WIS 128 – Glenwood City, Spring Valley	
Dunn	Town of Menomonie	42.7	68.7		WIS 79 north – Boyceville	
Dunn	Menomonie	45.7	73.5		WIS 25 north – Barron	Northern end of WIS 25 overlap
Dunn	Menomonie	47.2	76.0		WIS 25 south (Broadway Street) – Durand	Southern end of WIS 25 overlap
Dunn	Menomonie	47.5	76.4		WIS 29 west (Main Street) – Spring Valley	Western end of WIS 29 overlap
Dunn	Town of Elk Mound	59.4	95.6	60	I-94 – St. Paul, Madison	I-94 exit 52
Dunn	Town of Elk Mound	60.3	97.0	61	WIS 29 east / WIS 40 north / Alt. I-94 east – Colfax, Chippewa Falls	Eastern end of WIS 29 and I-94 Alt. overlap
Chippewa	No major junctions					
Eau Claire	Eau Claire	68.0	109.4		WIS 312 west (North Crossing)	Western end of WIS 312 overlap
Eau Claire	Eau Claire	70.6	113.6		WIS 312 east (North Crossing) / CTH-T	Eastern end of WIS 312 overlap
Eau Claire	Eau Claire	70.7	113.8		Truax Boulevard	Former Bus. US 12 east
Eau Claire	Eau Claire	74.3	119.6		WIS 37 south – Mondovi	
Eau Claire	Eau Claire	76.9	123.8		Bus. US 53 (Hastings Way)	
Eau Claire	Altoona	77.2	124.2		US 53 – Superior, La Crosse, Madison	US 53 exit 86
Eau Claire	Augusta	96.5	155.3		WIS 27 north – Cadott	Northern end of WIS 27 overlap
Jackson	Town of Cleveland	107.2	172.5		US 10 west – Osseo	Western end of US 10 overlap
Clark	Town of Mentor	109.7	176.5		US 10 east – Neillsville	Eastern end of US 10 overlap
Jackson	Merrillan	120.9	194.6		WIS 95 / Alt. I-94 west – Neillsville, Alma Center	Western end of I-94 Alt overlap
Jackson	Black River Falls	131.2	211.1		I-94 – Madison, St. Paul	I-94 exit 115
Jackson	Black River Falls	132.3	212.9		WIS 54 west – Melrose	Western end of WIS 54 overlap
Jackson	Black River Falls	132.5	213.2		WIS 54 east – Wisconsin Rapids	Eastern end of WIS 54 overlap
Jackson	Town of Brockway	133.0	214.0		WIS 27 south – Sparta	Southern end of WIS 27 overlap
Monroe	Tomah	159.8	257.2		I-94 – Madison, St. Paul	I-94 exit 143; no entrance from westbound I-94
Monroe	Tomah	160.0	257.5		WIS 21 – Necedah, Sparta	Provides access from westbound I-94
Monroe	Tomah	163.2	262.6		WIS 16 west / WIS 131 south / Alt. I-90 west – Wilton, Sparta	Western end of WIS 16 and I-90 Alt overlap
Monroe	Tomah	164.8	265.2		I-90 – Madison, La Crosse	I-90 exit 43
Juneau	New Lisbon	181.9	292.7		WIS 80 north – Necedah	Northern end of WIS 80 overlap
Juneau	New Lisbon	182.4	293.5		WIS 80 south – Elroy	Southern end of WIS 80 overlap
Juneau	Mauston	189.7	305.3		WIS 58 / WIS 82 (Union Street)	
Juneau	Town of Lyndon	207.3	333.6		I-90 / I-94 – Tomah, La Crosse, Madison	I-90 exit 85
Sauk	Wisconsin Dells	209.5	337.2		WIS 13 / WIS 16 east / WIS 23 east – Wisconsin Dells	Eastern end of WIS 16 overlap; northern end of WIS 23 overlap
Sauk	Lake Delton	212.2	341.5		WIS 23 (Munroe Avenue) – Reedsburg	Southern end of WIS 23 overlap
Sauk	Lake Delton	214.0	344.4	211	I-90 / I-94 – Madison, Milwaukee, Tomah, La Crosse, Eau Claire	Signed as exits 211A (west) and 211B (east); I-90 exit 92
Sauk	Town of Delton	214.8	345.7	212	Bus. US 12 / CTH-BD (Fern Dell Road)	
Sauk	Town of Delton	216.7	348.7	214	N. Reedsburg Road	Exit for Ho-Chunk Casino Wisconsin Dells
Sauk	Town of Delton	218.0	350.8	215	WIS 33 west – Reedsburg	Western end of WIS 33 overlap
Sauk	West Baraboo	220.8	355.3	218	WIS 33 east / WIS 136 / Alt. I-90 east / Alt. I-94 east – Baraboo, Rock Springs	Eastern end of WIS 33, I-90 Alt, and I-94 Alt overlap
Sauk	Baraboo	221.8	357.0	219	Bus. US 12 / CTH-W (South Boulevard)	
Sauk	Town of Prairie du Sac				Bus. US 12 east / CTH-Z (Prairie Road) – Prairie du Sac	
Sauk	Town of Prairie du Sac	235.4	378.8		WIS 60 west – Spring Green	Western end of WIS 60 overlap
Sauk	Sauk City	237.1	381.6		WIS 60 east / WIS 78 north / Bus. US 12 west – Prairie du Sac	Eastern end of WIS 60 overlap; northern end of WIS 78 overlap
Dane	Town of Roxbury	237.6	382.4		WIS 78 south – Black Earth, Mount Horeb	Southern end of WIS 78 overlap
Dane	Town of Roxbury	237.9	382.9		WIS 188 north – Lodi	
Dane	Town of Springfield	246.5	396.7		WIS 19 west – Mazomanie	Western end of WIS 19 overlap
Dane	Town of Springfield	248.0	399.1		WIS 19 east – Waunakee	Eastern end of WIS 19 overlap
Dane	Middleton	252.8	406.8	249	Parmenter Street	
Dane	Middleton	253.8	408.5	250	CTH-M (Century Avenue) / Airport Road	
Dane	Middleton	254.8	410.1	251A	US 14 west / CTH-MS / University Avenue – Spring Green, La Crosse, Cross Plains	Western end of US 14 overlap
Dane	Middleton	254.8	410.1	251B	Parmenter Street	Westbound exit only
Dane	Madison	255.3	410.9	252	Greenway Boulevard	
Dane	Madison	256.4	412.6	253	Old Sauk Road	
Dane	Madison	257.4	414.2	254	CTH-M / CTH-S (Mineral Point Road) – Verona, Mount Horeb	
Dane	Madison	258.6	416.2	255	Gammon Road	
Dane	Madison	260.2	418.8	257	Whitney Way	
Dane	Madison	261.4	420.7	258	US 18 west / US 151 south (Verona Road) / Midvale Boulevard – Dodgeville, Fitchburg	Western end of US 18 and US 151 overlaps.
Dane	Madison	261.9	421.5	258A	Seminole Highway	Westbound exit and eastbound entrance only; exit for UW Arboretum
Dane	Madison	263.0	423.3	259	Todd Drive	
Dane	Madison	263.8	424.5	260	CTH-D (Fish Hatchery Road) – Belleville	Eastbound exits signed 260A (south) and 260B (north)
Dane	Madison	264.5	425.7	261	US 14 east / US 151 north (Park St) – Oregon	Eastern end of US 14 and US 151 overlaps
Dane	Madison	265.3	427.0	262	CTH-MM (Rimrock Road)	
Dane	Madison	265.8	427.8	263	John Nolen Drive	
Dane	Monona	266.6	429.1	264	CTH-BW (West Broadway)	
Dane	Monona	268.1	431.5	265	Monona Drive	
Dane	Madison	269	433	266	US 51 (Stoughton Road) / Alt. I-39 north / Alt. I-90 west / Alt. I-94 west – McFarland	Western end of I-39 Alt, I-90 Alt, and I-94 Alt overlaps
Dane	Madison	270.5	435.3	267	I-39 / I-90 to I-94 – Janesville, Chicago, Wisconsin Dells, Milwaukee	Signed as exits 267A (east/south) and 267B (west/north); I-90 exit 142
Dane	Madison	271	436	268	Millpoint Road	Eastbound exit only
Dane	Madison	271.5	436.9	269	CTH-AB – Madison, McFarland	New roundabout interchange opened in September 2023.
Dane	Town of Cottage Grove	274.5	441.8	272	CTH-N – Cottage Grove, Stoughton	
Dane	Town of Deerfield	281.1	452.4		WIS 73 / Alt. I-39 south / Alt. I-90 east – Deerfield, Edgerton	Interchange; eastern end of I-39 Alt and I-90 Alt overlaps
Dane	Cambridge	284.2	457.4		WIS 134 north	
Dane	Cambridge	284.3	457.5		US 18 east / Alt. I-94 east – Jefferson	Eastern end of US 18 and I-94 Alt overlap
Jefferson	Fort Atkinson	293.9	473.0		WIS 26 – Watertown, Milton	
Jefferson	Fort Atkinson	295.3	475.2		Bus. WIS 26 south (Robert Street)	Southern end of WIS 26 Business overlap
Jefferson	Fort Atkinson	295.6	475.7		Bus. WIS 26 north (3rd Street) / WIS 89 north (Main Street) – Lake Mills	Northern end of WIS 26 Business overlap, Northern end of WIS 89 overlap
Jefferson	Fort Atkinson	295.7	475.9		WIS 106 (Riverside Drive) – Palmyra, Edgerton	
Rock	No major junctions					
Walworth	Whitewater				Bus. US 12 east (Tri-County Road) – Whitewater	
Walworth	Whitewater	305.4	491.5		WIS 59 west / WIS 89 south – Milton, Delavan	Southern end of WIS 89 overlap; western end of WIS 59 overlap
Walworth	Whitewater	307.8	495.4		Bus. US 12 west / WIS 59 east / CTH-P – Palmyra	Eastern end of WIS 59 overlap
Walworth	Town of La Grange	317.6	511.1		WIS 20 east / WIS 67 north – East Troy, Eagle	Northern end of WIS 67 overlap
Walworth	Elkhorn	325.0	523.0		WIS 67 south – Elkhorn, Williams Bay	Southern end of WIS 67 overlap
Walworth	Elkhorn	327– 327.4	526– 526.9	321	I-43 (Bray Road) / CTH-NN – Beloit, Milwaukee, Elkhorn	Unnumbered exits via collector-distributor lane
Walworth	Lake Geneva	334.4	538.2	328	WIS 120 north – Burlington, Lake Geneva	Northern end of WIS 120 overlap
Walworth	Lake Geneva	335.5	539.9	330	WIS 50 / WIS 120 south – Lake Geneva, Paddock Lake, Kenosha	Southern end of WIS 120 overlap; eastbound exits signed 330A (west) and 330B (east)
Walworth	Town of Bloomfield	340.6	548.1	335	Pell Lake Road	
Walworth	Genoa City	344.7	554.7		US 12 east – Chicago	Continuation into Illinois
1.000 mi = 1.609 km; 1.000 km = 0.621 mi: Concurrency terminus; Incomplete access

== See also ==
U.S. Route 12
Previous state: Minnesota	Wisconsin	Next state: Illinois
