= Wisconsin Highway 120 =

State highway in Wisconsin, United States

State Trunk Highway 120
- WIS 120 highlighted in red

Route information
- Maintained by WisDOT
- Length: 21.34 mi (34.34 km)

Major junctions
- South end: IL 47 in Genoa City
- US 12 / WIS 50 in Lake Geneva
- North end: I-43 in East Troy

Location
- Country: United States
- State: Wisconsin
- Counties: Walworth

Highway system
- Wisconsin State Trunk Highway System; Interstate; US; State; Scenic; Rustic
← WIS 119	→ WIS 121

State Trunk Highway 120 (often called Highway 120, STH-120 or WIS 120) is a state highway in the U.S. state of Wisconsin. It runs in north–south in southeast Wisconsin from the Illinois Border near Lake Geneva to south of East Troy. It continues in Illinois as State Route 47.

== Route description ==
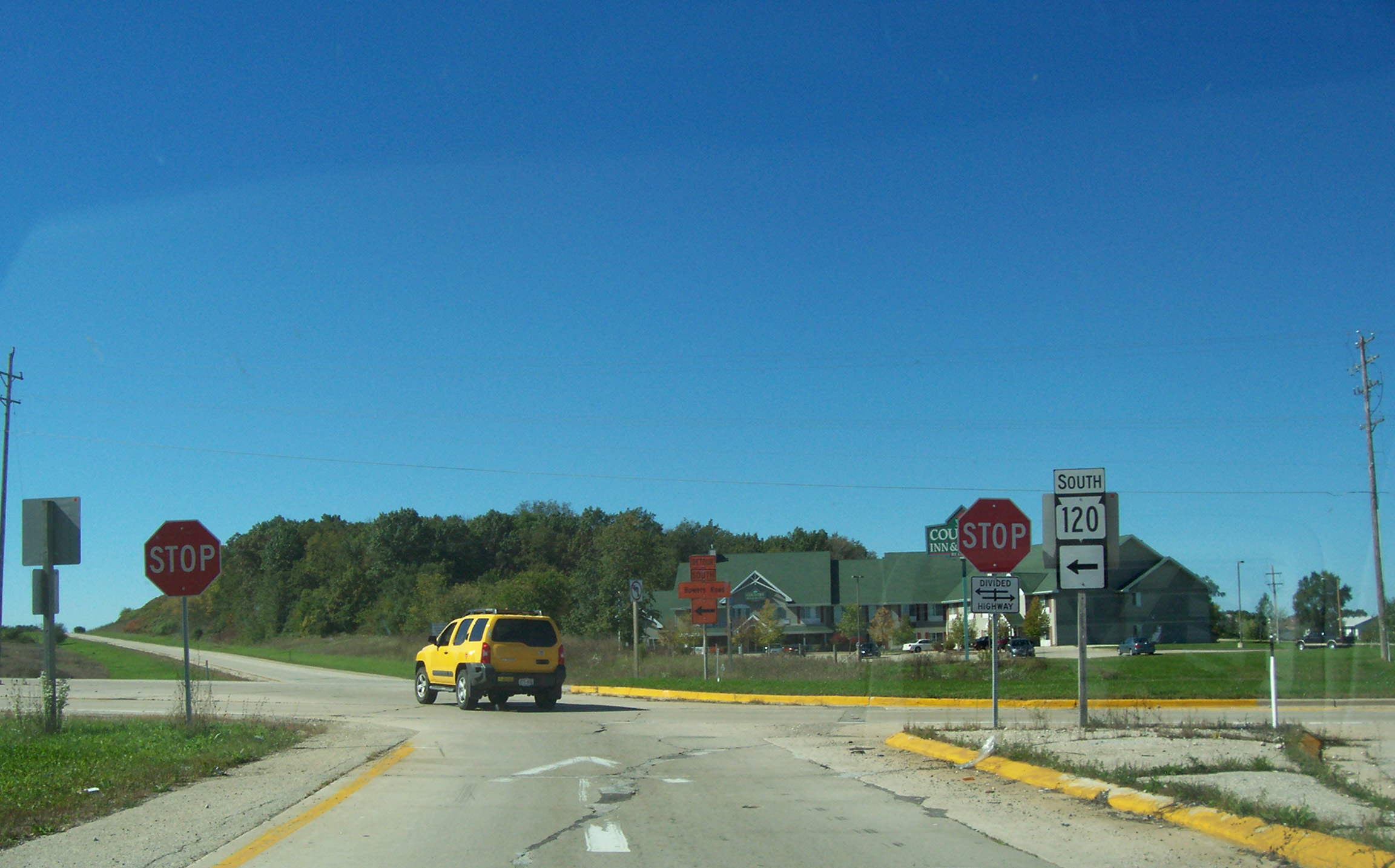
Northern terminus

WIS 120 begins at the Illinois state line as a continuation of IL 47. After 3.5 miles (5.6 km) of straight road, WIS 120 turns east, then curves north to bypass downtown Lake Geneva. 4.5 miles (7.2 km) later, it meets WIS 50 for a short concurrency (picking up CTH-H along the way). After the less-than 0.5 miles (0.80 km) overlap, WIS 120 and CTH-H join US Highway 12 as a freeway at Exit 330A, while WIS 50 heads east toward Kenosha. WIS 120 and CTH-H exit the US 12 freeway at Exit 328. While CTH-H turns south toward downtown, WIS 120 turns north to meet the western terminus of WIS 36 and the White River State Trail in unincorporated Springfield after 2.5 miles (4.0 km) of rural road. Continuing another 3.5 miles (5.6 km), WIS 120 meets WIS 11 in unincorporated Spring Prairie. WIS 120 then meets its northern terminus at I-43 almost 6 miles (9.7 km) later. The road continues as CTH-G/Church Street into Downtown East Troy.

WIS 120 starts as a rural two-lane highway. It becomes a four-lane divided road at the southern end of the overlap with CTH-H. It continues as such up to and including the WIS 50 overlap and the roughly 1 mile (1.6 km) section of freeway it shares with US 12 on the east side of Lake Geneva. Once it splits from US 12, it resumes as a two-lane road through its northern terminus at I-43.

=== Attractions ===
- Alpine Valley Resort, Golf Club and Theater
- Hawks View Golf Club
- Grand Geneva Resort (formerly the Playboy Club Resort of Lake Geneva)
- Hillmoor Country Club
- Big Foot Beach State Park

== History ==
WIS 120 started showing up on state maps as early as 1937, however it ended in WIS 50 in downtown Lake Geneva. Around 1987-1988, WIS 120 and CTH-H were routed around downtown using their present routes, WIS 50, and US 12. WIS 120 continued straight past the current turn-off via Pilgrim Church Road, Lake Shore Drive, Baker Street, Wrigley Drive, and Broad Street. Also, part of the present-day route was WIS 36 and CTH-G from Lake Geneva to East Troy, until WIS 36 was truncated to its present terminus in Springfield around the same time as WIS 120 was rerouted. As a result, WIS 120 superseded parts of WIS 36 to Lake Geneva and CTH-G to its present terminus at I-43 in East Troy. The route has remained unchanged to this day.

== Major intersections ==
The entire highway is in Walworth County.

Location	mi	km	Destinations	Notes
Town of Linn	0.00	0.00	IL 47 south – Woodstock	Continuation into Illinois
Town of Linn	1.50	2.41	CTH-B – Zenda, Genoa City	
Town of Linn	3.51	5.65	CTH-BB	
Village of Bloomfield	5.86	9.43	CTH-H	
Lake Geneva	7.87	12.67	WIS 50 west – Delavan	Southern end of WIS 50 concurrency
Lake Geneva	8.25	13.28	US 12 east / WIS 50 east – Chicago, Kenosha	Northern end of WIS 50 concurrency; southern end of US 12 concurrency
Lake Geneva	9.36	15.06	US 12 west – Madison	Northern end of US 12 concurrency
Town of Lyons	11.76	18.93	WIS 36 east – Lyons, Burlington	
Town of Spring Prairie	15.40	24.78	WIS 11 to I-43 – Burlington	
Town of Spring Prairie	19.21	30.92	CTH-D – Alpine Valley	
Town of East Troy	21.34	34.34	I-43 – Milwaukee, Beloit	
1.000 mi = 1.609 km; 1.000 km = 0.621 mi
