= Wisconsin Highway 65 =

Highway in Wisconsin

State Trunk Highway 65
- WIS 65 highlighted in red

Route information
- Maintained by WisDOT
- Length: 54.12 mi (87.10 km)

Major junctions
- South end: US 10 / US 63 in Ellsworth
- I-94 in Roberts; US 12 in Roberts
- North end: US 8 in St. Croix Falls

Location
- Country: United States
- State: Wisconsin
- Counties: Pierce, St. Croix, Polk

Highway system
- Wisconsin State Trunk Highway System; Interstate; US; State; Scenic; Rustic
← WIS 64	→ WIS 66

State Trunk Highway 65 (often called Highway 65, STH-65 or WIS 65) is a state highway in the U.S. state of Wisconsin. It runs north–south in west central Wisconsin from St. Croix Falls to Ellsworth.

== Route description ==
WIS 65 begins at the corner of West Main Street (US Highway 10, US 10) and North Maple Street in downtown Ellsworth in Pierce County. WIS 65 heads north on Maple Street out of town, splitting off with County Trunk Highway J (CTH-J) north of the Ellsworth Country Club golf course.

WIS 65 then heads in a generally west-northwesterly direction towards River Falls. At its intersection with WIS 29 at East Cascade Avenue, it is concurrently marked with WIS 35 north to its interchange with North Main Street on the northeast side of town. WIS 35 continues to the north while WIS 65 turns northeast on North Main and out of town.

WIS 65 runs parallel to the Kinnickinnic River along its northern banks until reaching North River Road outside of River Falls. WIS 65 then turns due north to its interchange with Interstate 94 (I-94) near Twin Lakes (Exit 10).

North of I-94, WIS 65 heads north as 120th Street into the village of Roberts where it intersects with US 12. WIS 65 then heads east with US 12 for about four blocks before heading north on 130th Street.

WIS 65 continues due north into the city of New Richmond, where it becomes South Knowles Avenue. The street is named for the former Wisconsin state governor, Warren P. Knowles, who lived in the city. WIS 65 continues through the city, becoming North Knowles Avenue after crossing the Willow River. WIS 65 intersects with WIS 64 to the northeast of the city, near Hatfield Lake and New Richmond Municipal Airport.

WIS 65 heads due north again to the village of Star Prairie, where it enters the village as Jewell Street. At its intersection with Hill Avenue (CTH-H), WIS 65 curves to the west for a block before turning north onto Main Street. WIS 65 runs north for three blocks on Main Street before turning east again on Jerdee Avenue for a block, then continuing north on Jewell Street to the Polk–St. Croix County line.

WIS 65 turns to the northeast for several miles before turning again towards the north at its intersection with CTH-C in Polk County. WIS 65 continues north through a mostly rural part of the state, finally reaching its northern terminus with US 8 near Deer Lake, east of St. Croix Falls.

== History ==
Initially, WIS 65 traveled from WIS 12 (now US 12) in Baraboo to WIS 10/WIS 29 (now US 51 and WIS 16 respectively) in Portage via present-day WIS 33. In 1919, WIS 33 extended eastward to Waupun, superseding the whole of WIS 65 in the process. As a result, WIS 65 was moved onto a Patch Grove–Monroe route (some parts were not previously signed as a state highway). This route ran from WIS 19 (now US 18) in Patch Grove to WIS 20/WIS 42 (now WIS 11 and WIS 69 respectively) in Monroe via parts of present-day WIS 35 and WIS 81. In 1923, WIS 65 was relocated again in favor of the extensions of WIS 61 and WIS 35. This time, it was relocated onto a portion of its modern-day routing, traveling from WIS 35 north of River Falls to WIS 24/WIS 64 (now just WIS 64) in New Richmond.

In 1947, WIS 65 was extended northward to US 8 near Deer Lake, replacing CTH-K in the process. The northern extension was not completely paved in asphalt until 1950. By 1989, a part of WIS 35 from Hager City to River Falls moved west closer to the Mississippi and the St. Croix rivers. As a result, WIS 65 extended southward to US 10/US 63 in Ellsworth. In 1993, a two-lane downtown bypass was completed in River Falls.

== Major intersections ==
County	Location	mi	km	Destinations	Notes
Pierce	Ellsworth	0.0	0.0	US 10 / US 63 (Main Street) – Durand, Prescott, Red Wing	Southern terminus of WIS 65
Pierce	River Falls	10.9	17.5	WIS 29 west / WIS 35 south (Cemetery Road) / 830th Avenue – Prescott	Southern end of WIS 29/WIS 35 concurrency
Pierce	River Falls	11.5	18.5	WIS 29 east / Cascade Avenue – Spring Valley, River Falls, UW-River Falls, Chippewa Valley Technical College	Northern end of WIS 29 concurrency
St. Croix	River Falls	12.5	20.1	CTH-M (Division Street)	Quadrant interchange
St. Croix	River Falls	13.8	22.2	WIS 35 north / Main Street – Hudson	Northern end of WIS 35 concurrency
St. Croix		21.5	34.6	I-94 – Hudson, Eau Claire	
St. Croix		23.8	38.3	US 12 west / 120th Street – Hudson	Southern end of US 12 concurrency
St. Croix	Roberts	24.8	39.9	US 12 east / 130th Street – Hammond	Northern end of US 12 concurrency
St. Croix	New Richmond	33.6	54.1	Bus. WIS 64 west (Fourth Street)	Eastern terminus of Bus. WIS 64
St. Croix	New Richmond	34.8	56.0	WIS 64	
Polk		54.1	87.1	US 8 – St. Croix Falls, Turtle Lake	Northern terminus of WIS 65
1.000 mi = 1.609 km; 1.000 km = 0.621 mi
