= Wisconsin Highway 318 =

Highway in Wisconsin

State Trunk Highway 318
- Meadowbrook Road
- WIS 318 highlighted in red

Route information
- Maintained by WisDOT
- Length: 2.0 mi (3.2 km)

Major junctions
- South end: US 18 in Waukesha
- North end: I-94 in Pewaukee

Location
- Country: United States
- State: Wisconsin
- Counties: Waukesha

Highway system
- Wisconsin State Trunk Highway System; Interstate; US; State; Scenic; Rustic
← WIS 312	→ WIS 441

State Trunk Highway 318 (WIS 318) is a 2.0-mile (3.2 km) state highway in Waukesha County, Wisconsin, United States, that runs north–south as a bypass route along the northwest border of the city of Waukesha. The highway follows Meadowbrook Road and is maintained by the Wisconsin Department of Transportation (WisDOT).

== Route description ==
WIS 318 begins at US Route 18 (US 18) on the west side of Waukesha. Heading north, and after crossing Northview Road, it rises up to Rolling Ridge Drive and the entrance to Meadowbrook Elementary School in the Waukesha School District. It then descends to Silvernail Road and the eastbound on-ramp to Interstate 94 (I-94). The northern terminus is on the north side of the I-94 on the westbound on-ramp.

== History ==
WIS 318 was established by WisDOT in late 2017 when the Waukesha West Bypass was formed. US 18 was rerouted through Downtown Waukesha and now uses the new bypass and Les Paul Parkway.

Meadowbrook Road has existed on maps of western Waukesha County since the 1890s, connecting the former route of Wisconsin Highway 30 to Northview Road. Before construction on a new interchange with I-94 in the late 1990s, the road descended down a steep grade of about 79 feet (24 m) just north of Meadowbrook School.

The section between Northview and Summit Avenue was opened around 1999.

== Major intersections ==
The entire route is in Waukesha County.

Location	mi	km	Destinations	Notes
Waukesha	0.0	0.0	US 18 east (Les Paul Parkway/Summit Avenue) – Milwaukee, Dousman, Jefferson; Merrill Hills Road south	Roadway continues as Merrill Hills Road
Pewaukee	2.0	3.2	I-94 east – Brookfield, Milwaukee, Pewaukee, Waukesha CTH-G north (Meadowbrook Road)	Roadway continues as CTH-G
1.000 mi = 1.609 km; 1.000 km = 0.621 mi
