= Genoa City, Wisconsin =

- Village
- Location of Genoa City in Walworth County, Wisconsin
- Coordinates: 42°30′13″N 88°19′34″W
- Country: United States
- State: Wisconsin
- Counties: Kenosha, Walworth
- Incorporated: October 15, 1901
- Renamed: January 24, 1924

Area
  - Total: 2.65 sq mi (6.86 km^{2})
  - Land: 2.65 sq mi (6.86 km^{2})
  - Water: 0 sq mi (0.00 km^{2})
- Elevation: 830 ft (253 m)

Population (2020)
  - Total: 2,982
  - Density: 1,127.3/sq mi (435.25/km^{2})
- Time zone: UTC-6 (Central (CST))
  - Summer (DST): UTC-5 (CDT)
- ZIP Code: 53128
- Area code: 262
- FIPS code: 55-28675
- GNIS feature ID: 1565461
- Website: www.vi.genoacity.wi.gov

Genoa City is a village located in Kenosha and Walworth counties in the U.S. state of Wisconsin, 43 mi (69 km) south-southwest of Milwaukee, located on the Illinois–Wisconsin border. The population was 2,982 at the 2020 census. It was named after Genoa, New York, which, in turn, was named after Genoa, Italy.

== History ==
Genoa City's land was purchased from the government in 1841. James Dickerson originally platted the village, first known simply as "Genoa", on May 9 and 19, 1850, and it was recorded July 12 that year. There were 23 lots and settlers paid $1.25 an acre. The first two railroad lines were built in the 1850s and 1862, respectively. In 1853, a Congregational Church moved from Bloomfield to Genoa City and built a new church. A bell was added in 1872, and a classroom in 1893. The post office was renamed "Genoa Junction" in 1874 and the village was first incorporated as such on October 15, 1901. By 1880, Genoa City had about 300 residents and a post office, hotel, flour mill, grist mill, lumber yard, drug store, grocery store, hardware store, tailor, shoe maker, two carriage shops, three general stores, and two salon keepers. In 1885, Adolph Freeman platted two additions after fire destroyed many businesses on Freeman Street, which was named after him, the year prior. In the 1890s, new buildings replaced the ones lost in the fire. The village's name was officially changed from Genoa Junction to Genoa City on January 24, 1924.

== Geography ==
Genoa City is located at 42°30′13″N 88°19′34″W (42.503612, -88.326063).

According to the United States Census Bureau, the village has a total area of 2.34 square miles (6.06 km^{2}), all land.

== Demographics ==
Historical population
Census	Pop.	Note	%±
1880	303		—
1910	709		—
1920	656		−7.5%
1930	683		4.1%
1940	715		4.7%
1950	866		21.1%
1960	1,005		16.1%
1970	1,085		8.0%
1980	1,202		10.8%
1990	1,277		6.2%
2000	1,949		52.6%
2010	3,042		56.1%
2020	2,982		−2.0%
U.S. Decennial Census

=== 2020 census ===
Genoa City village, Wisconsin – Racial and ethnic composition Note: the US Census treats Hispanic/Latino as an ethnic category. This table excludes Latinos from the racial categories and assigns them to a separate category. Hispanics/Latinos may be of any race.
Race / Ethnicity (NH = Non-Hispanic)	Pop 2000	Pop 2010	Pop 2020	% 2000	% 2010	% 2020
White alone (NH)	1,848	2,769	2,525	94.82%	91.03%	84.67%
Black or African American alone (NH)	3	20	8	0.15%	0.66%	0.27%
Native American or Alaska Native alone (NH)	3	6	18	0.15%	0.20%	0.60%
Asian alone (NH)	10	12	9	0.51%	0.39%	0.30%
Native Hawaiian or Pacific Islander alone (NH)	0	0	0	0.00%	0.00%	0.00%
Other race alone (NH)	1	1	9	0.05%	0.03%	0.30%
Mixed race or Multiracial (NH)	21	35	109	1.08%	1.15%	3.66%
Hispanic or Latino (any race)	63	199	304	3.23%	6.54%	10.19%
Total	1,949	3,042	2,982	100.00%	100.00%	100.00%

=== 2010 census ===
As of the census of 2010, there were 3,042 people, 1,072 households, and 784 families living in the village. The population density was 1,300.0 inhabitants per square mile (501.9/km^{2}). There were 1,178 housing units at an average density of 503.4 units per square mile (194.4 units/km^{2}). The racial makeup of the village was 95.4% White, 0.7% African American, 0.3% Native American, 0.4% Asian, 1.9% from other races, and 1.3% from two or more races. Hispanic or Latino of any race were 6.5% of the population.

There were 1,072 households, of which 47.3% had children under the age of 18 living with them, 55.2% were married couples living together, 11.6% had a female householder with no husband present, 6.3% had a male householder with no wife present, and 26.9% were non-families. 21.3% of all households were made up of individuals, and 6.6% had someone living alone who was 65 years of age or older. The average household size was 2.82 and the average family size was 3.29.

The median age in the village was 31.9 years. 32.1% of residents were under the age of 18; 6.3% were between the ages of 18 and 24; 33.2% were from 25 to 44; 20.7% were from 45 to 64; and 7.7% were 65 years of age or older. The gender makeup of the village was 49.6% male and 50.4% female.

=== 2000 census ===
As of the census of 2000, there were 1,949 people, 674 households, and 512 families living in the village. The population density was 875.1 inhabitants per square mile (337.9/km^{2}). There were 699 housing units at an average density of 313.9 units per square mile (121.2 units/km^{2}). The racial makeup of the village was 97.49% White, 0.15% African American, 0.15% Native American, 0.51% Asian, 0.31% from other races, and 1.39% from two or more races. Hispanic or Latino of any race were 3.23% of the population.

There were 674 households, out of which 48.2% had children under the age of 18 living with them, 60.7% were married couples living together, 11.0% had a female householder with no husband present, and 23.9% were non-families. 19.7% of all households were made up of individuals, and 4.3% had someone living alone who was 65 years of age or older. The average household size was 2.87 and the average family size was 3.30.

In the village, the population was spread out, with 34.0% under the age of 18, 7.1% from 18 to 24, 35.8% from 25 to 44, 15.7% from 45 to 64, and 7.4% who were 65 years of age or older. The median age was 30 years. For every 100 females, there were 101.3 males. For every 100 females age 18 and over, there were 98.3 males.

The median income for a household in the village was $49,338, and the median income for a family was $56,298. Males had a median income of $39,890 versus $24,671 for females. The per capita income for the village was $18,044. About 3.7% of families and 4.4% of the population were below the poverty line, including 5.4% of those under age 18 and 5.0% of those age 65 or over.

== Transportation ==
=== Major highways ===
The following highways pass through or near Genoa City:

- I-43 is 17 miles (27 km) northwest of the village.
- I-94 is 20 miles (32 km) east of the village.
- US 12
- WIS 50 is six miles (9.7 km) north of the village.
- CTH-B (Walworth County)
- CTH-H (Walworth County)
- CTH-U (Walworth County)
- CTH-O (Kenosha County)
- CTH-P (Kenosha County)

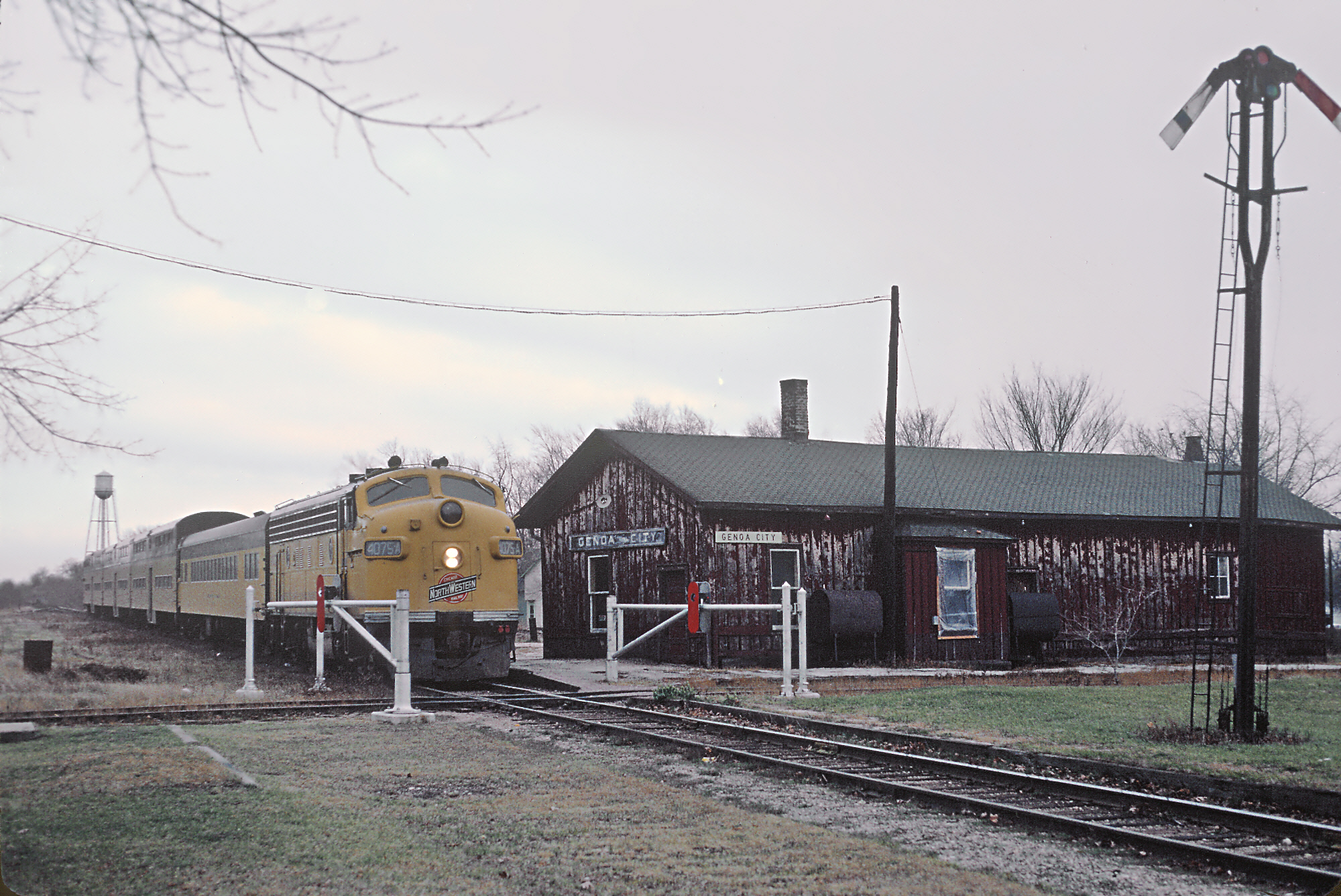
A CNW train at Genoa City in December 1964

=== Airports ===
- Burlington Municipal Airport is in Burlington.
- General Mitchell International Airport, located in Milwaukee, is the village's closest major airport.

=== Railroads ===
There are no railway lines in Genoa City. Until 1975 there were two lines (Chicago & North Western Williams Bay line and the KD Line).

== In popular culture ==
The television soap opera The Young and the Restless is set in a fictionalized version of Genoa City, Wisconsin, in which the city is portrayed as a metropolis. The show's creators, William and Lee Phillip Bell, had a vacation home in Lake Geneva and passed through Genoa City when visiting.
