= Humbird, Wisconsin =

Census-designated place in Wisconsin, United States

- Census-designated place
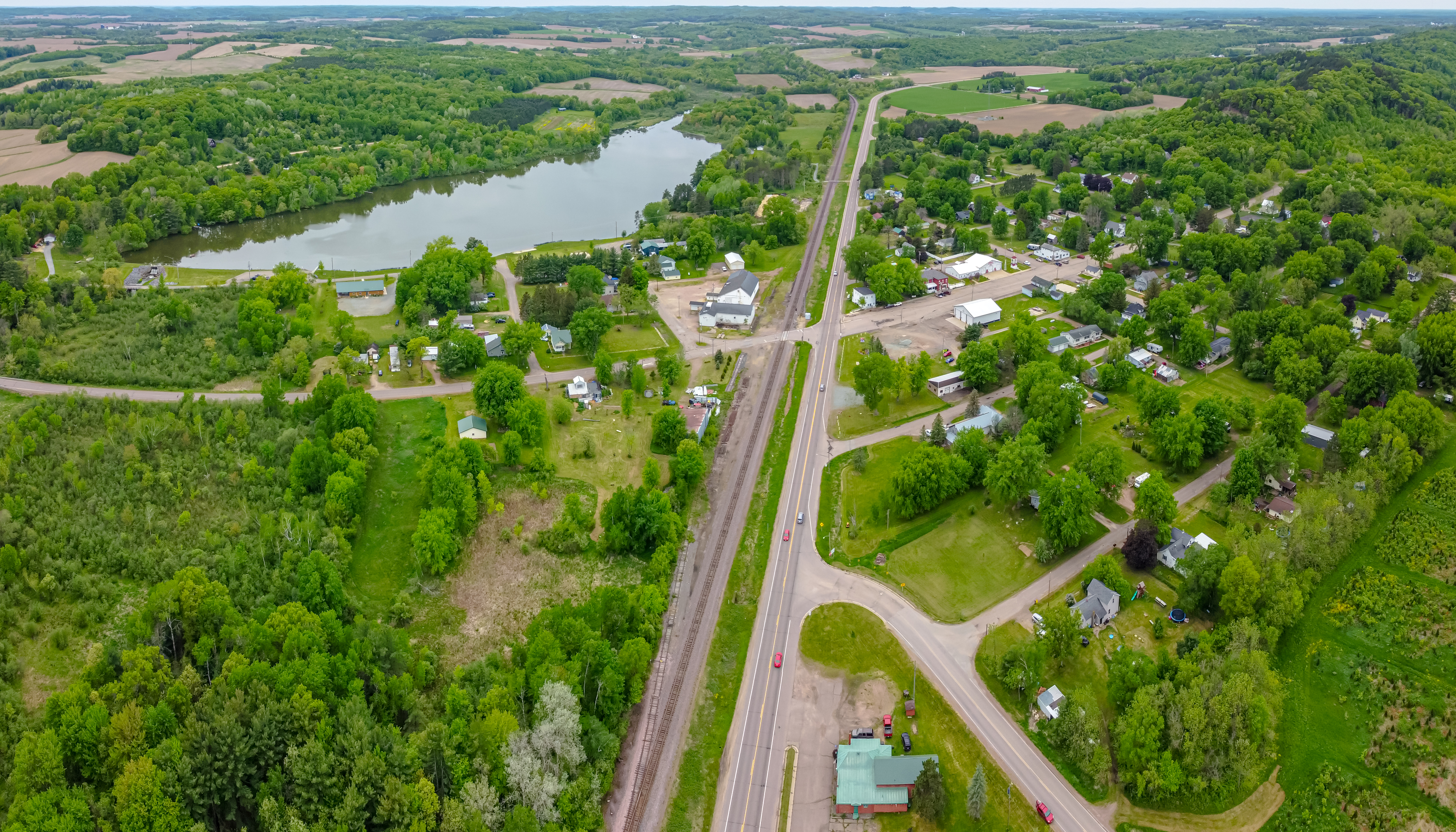
- US-12/Wis-27 run through town

- Location within Wisconsin
- Coordinates: 44°31′45″N 90°53′22″W
- Country: United States
- State: Wisconsin
- County: Clark
- Town: Mentor

Area
  - Total: 1.135 sq mi (2.94 km^{2})
  - Land: 1.135 sq mi (2.94 km^{2})
  - Water: 0 sq mi (0 km^{2})
- Elevation: 1,024 ft (312 m)

Population (2010)
  - Total: 266
  - Density: 234/sq mi (90.5/km^{2})
- Time zone: UTC-6 (Central (CST))
  - Summer (DST): UTC-5 (CDT)
- ZIP code: 54746
- Area codes: 715 & 534
- GNIS feature ID: 1566795

Humbird is an unincorporated census-designated place in the Town of Mentor in Clark County, Wisconsin, United States. It is located on U.S. Route 12, north-northwest of Merrillan. As of the 2020 census, Humbird had a population of 254. Humbird has a post office with ZIP code 54746.

== History ==
Humbird was founded by Jacob Humbird, who was born at Ligonier, Pennsylvania on July 31, 1811. The second of five children of Solomon and Susan Humbert, Jacob was married to Eleanor McKee in 1835. They had four sons and four daughters. Jacob and his brother pursued careers in railroad building. He built Dom Pedro Secundo Railroad in Brazil from Rio de Janeiro to the interior of the country. In 1867 Humbird and D. A. Baldwin built the main line of the West Wisconsin Railroad from Elroy to Hudson. The tracks were laid to Humbird in late 1869. The depot opened for business on January 1, 1870.

== Geography ==
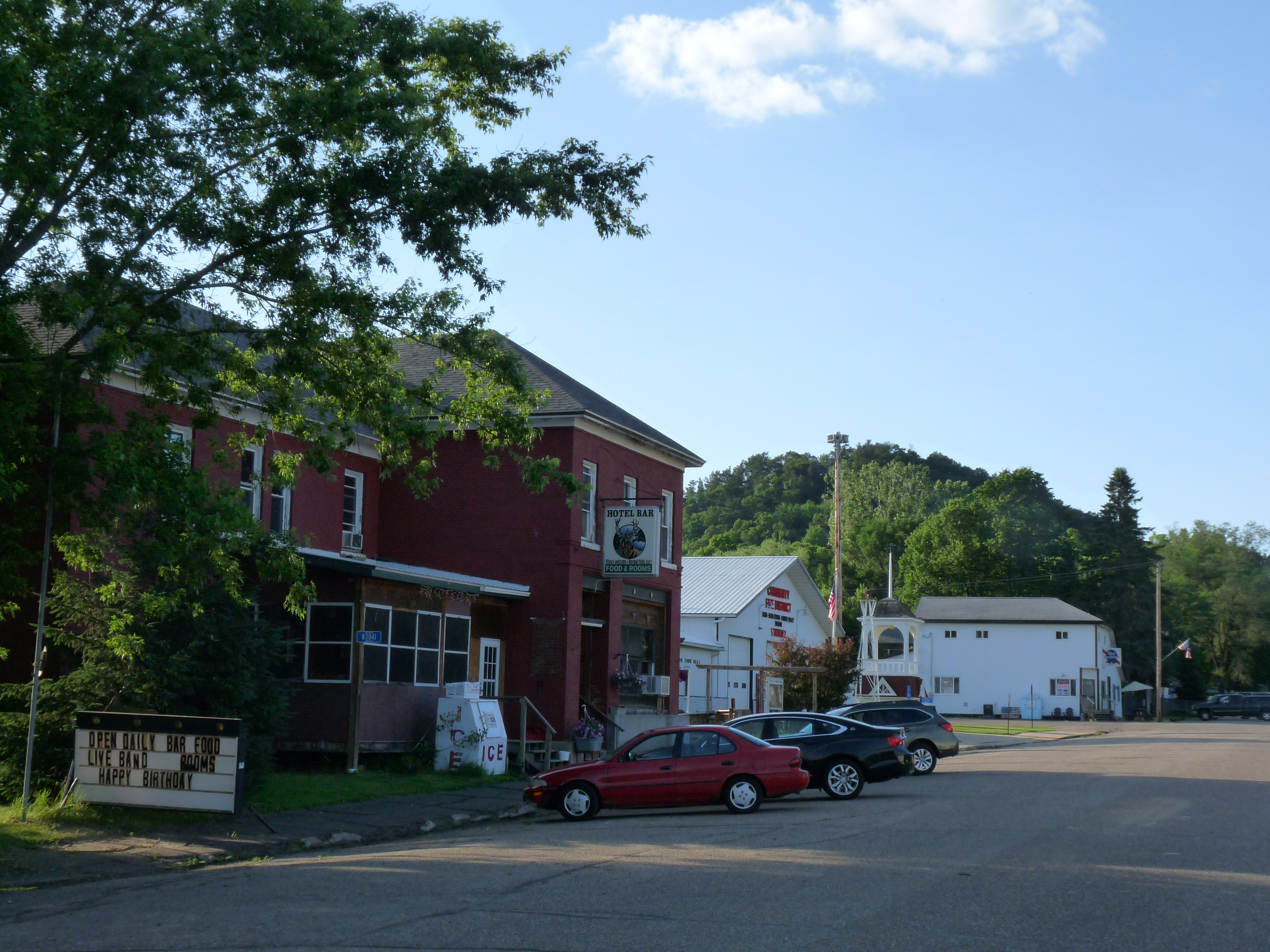
Downtown, with the bluff behind

Humbird contains a pond, a bluff, farm land, recreational land, and several ATV trails. The pond is 13 acres (0.053 km^{2}) in area and 6 feet (1.8 m) at its deepest point. Although named Emerson Lake, it is commonly called Humbird Pond.

== Education ==
School District of Alma Center-Humbird-Merrillan operates public schools.
