= Roberts, Wisconsin =

- Village
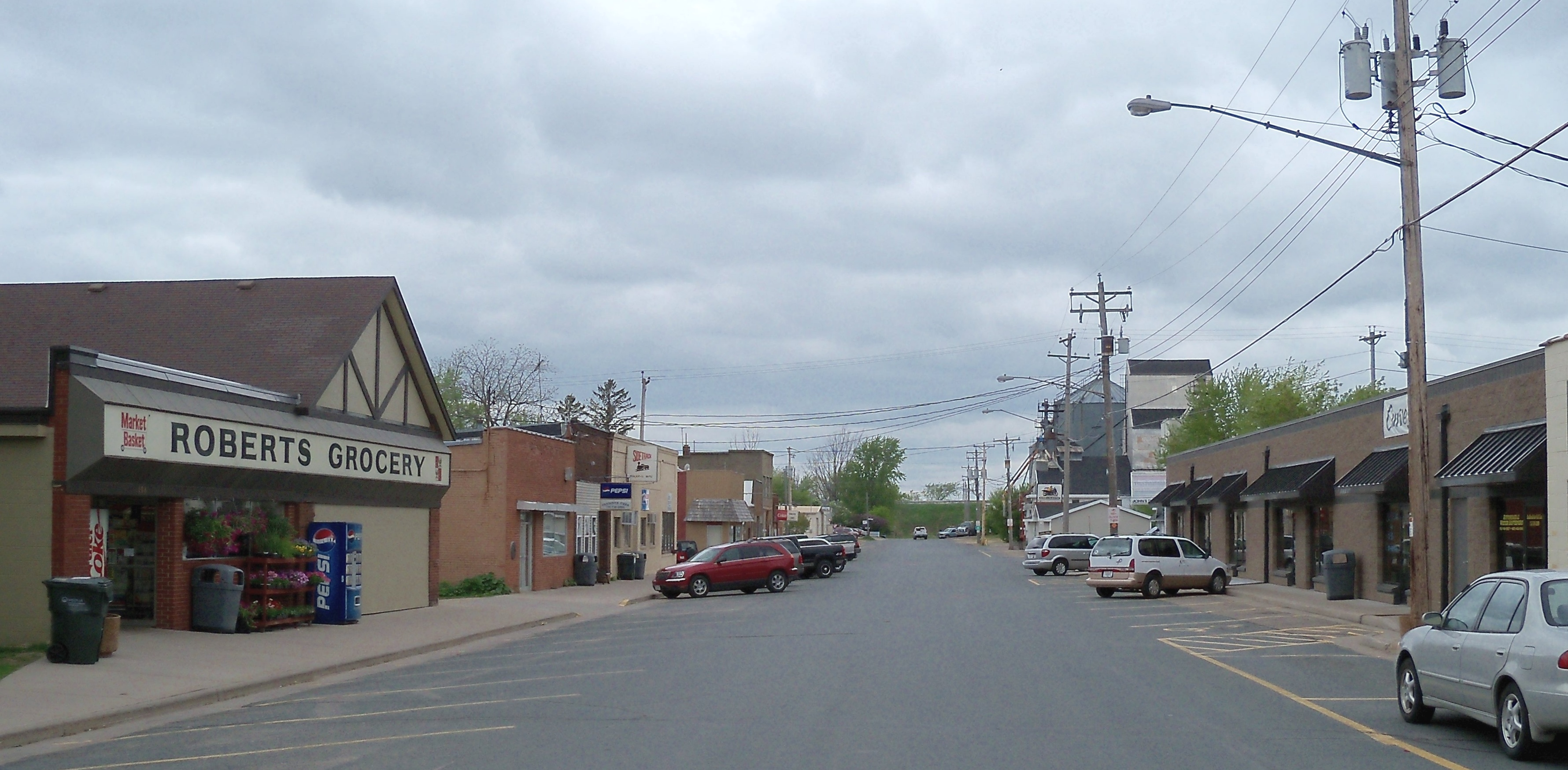

- Location of Roberts in St. Croix County, Wisconsin

- Location within the state of Wisconsin Location within the United States Roberts (North America)
- Coordinates: 44°59′2″N 92°33′14″W
- Country: United States
- State: Wisconsin
- County: St. Croix

Area
  - Total: 2.59 sq mi (6.70 km^{2})
  - Land: 2.59 sq mi (6.70 km^{2})
  - Water: 0 sq mi (0.00 km^{2})
- Elevation: 1,033 ft (315 m)

Population (2020)
  - Total: 1,919
  - Density: 742/sq mi (286/km^{2})
- Time zone: UTC-6 (Central (CST))
  - Summer (DST): UTC-5 (CDT)
- Area codes: 715 & 534
- FIPS code: 55-68475
- GNIS feature ID: 1581705
- Website: www.robertswisconsin.com

Roberts is a village in St. Croix County, Wisconsin, United States, on the outer edge of the Minneapolis–St. Paul metropolitan area. The population was 1,919 at the 2020 census. The village is surrounded by the town of Warren.

== History ==
Roberts was named in 1873 for John Bannister Gibson Roberts, the chief engineer for the West Wisconsin Railroad. A post office called Roberts has been in operation since 1884. During the 1899 New Richmond tornado, some people of the town rode on horseback to Roberts to telegraph St. Paul about the tornado's impact on New Richmond, since their lines were destroyed by the tornado.

== Geography ==
According to the United States Census Bureau, the village has an area of 2.26 square miles (5.85 km^{2}), all land.

Roberts is located at 44°59′2″N 92°33′14″W (44.983807, -92.553790).

Roberts is along Interstate 94, U.S. Highway 12, and Wisconsin Highway 65.

== Demographics ==
Historical population
Census	Pop.	Note	%±
1880	86		—
1950	290		—
1960	308		6.2%
1970	484		57.1%
1980	833		72.1%
1990	1,043		25.2%
2000	969		−7.1%
2010	1,651		70.4%
2020	1,919		16.2%
U.S. Decennial Census

=== 2010 census ===
At the 2010 census, there were 1,651 people, 625 households and 442 families in the village. The population density was 730.5 inhabitants per square mile (282.0/km^{2}). There were 724 housing units at an average density of 320.4 per square mile (123.7/km^{2}). The racial makeup of the village was 94.5% White, 1.4% African American, 0.4% Native American, 1.5% Asian, 0.2% Pacific Islander, 0.7% from other races, and 1.3% from two or more races. Hispanic or Latino of any race were 2.1% of the population.

There were 625 households, of which 41.1% had children under the age of 18 living with them, 52.0% were married couples living together, 11.5% had a female householder with no husband present, 7.2% had a male householder with no wife present, and 29.3% were non-families. 21.9% of all households were made up of individuals, and 5.2% had someone living alone who was 65 years of age or older. The average household size was 2.64 and the average family size was 3.09.

The median age was 31.3 years. 29.5% of residents were under the age of 18; 7% were between the ages of 18 and 24; 35.6% were from 25 to 44; 22% were from 45 to 64; and 5.7% were 65 years of age or older. The population was 50.5% male and 49.5% female.

=== 2000 census ===
At the 2000 census, there were 969 people, 392 households and 255 families residing in the village. The population density was 1,805.3 inhabitants per square mile (697.0/km^{2}). There were 402 housing units at an average density of 748.9 per square mile (289.2/km^{2}). The racial makeup of the village was 97.94% White, 0.10% African American, 0.52% Native American, 0.41% Asian, 0.31% from other races, and 0.72% from two or more races. Hispanic or Latino of any race were 0.93% of the population.

There were 392 households, of which 33.2% had children under the age of 18 living with them, 48.7% were married couples living together, 10.5% had a female householder with no husband present, and 34.7% were non-families. 25.8% of all households were made up of individuals, and 5.6% had someone living alone who was 65 years of age or older. The average household size was 2.47 and the average family size was 3.00.

24.9% of the population were under the age of 18, 11.6% from 18 to 24, 35.3% from 25 to 44, 21.7% from 45 to 64, and 6.6% who were 65 years of age or older. The median age was 32 years. For every 100 females, there were 99.8 males. For every 100 females age 18 and over, there were 100.6 males.

The median household income was $42,258 and the median family income was $47,857. Males had a median income of $35,968 compared with $23,819 for females. The per capita income for the village was $19,616. About 3.5% of families and 5.5% of the population were below the poverty line, including 4.2% of those under age 18 and 21.2% of those age 65 or over.

== Education ==
St. Croix Central Elementary School is in Roberts. St. Croix Central Middle and High Schools are in the neighboring community of Hammond.

== See also ==
- List of villages in Wisconsin
