= Interstate 94 in Wisconsin =

Section of Interstate Highway in Wisconsin, United States

Interstate 94
- I-94 highlighted in red

Route information
- Maintained by WisDOT
- Length: 348.23 mi (560.42 km)
- NHS: Entire route

Major junctions
- West end: I-94 / US 12 at Minnesota state line
- US 63 in Baldwin; US 53 in Eau Claire; US 10 in Osseo; I-90 in Tomah; US 12 in Lake Delton; I-39 in Portage; I-39 / I-90 in Madison; I-41 / I-894 / US 41 / US 45 in Milwaukee; I-43 / I-794 in Milwaukee; I-41 / I-43 / I-894 / US 41 in Milwaukee
- East end: I-41 / I-94 / US 41 at Illinois state line

Location
- Country: United States
- State: Wisconsin
- Counties: St. Croix, Dunn, Eau Claire, Trempealeau, Jackson, Monroe, Juneau, Sauk, Columbia, Dane, Jefferson, Waukesha, Milwaukee, Racine, Kenosha

Highway system
- Interstate Highway System; Main; Auxiliary; Suffixed; Business; Future; Wisconsin State Trunk Highway System; Interstate; US; State; Scenic; Rustic
← WIS 93	→ WIS 95

Interstate 94 (I-94) runs east–west through the western, central, and southeastern portions of the US state of Wisconsin. A total of 348.23 miles (560.42 km) of I-94 lie in the state.

== Route description ==
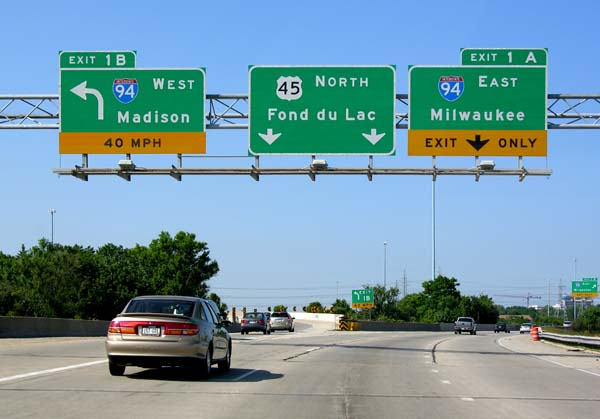
I-894 west (cardinal north) at the Zoo Interchange (I-94), predating the interchange's 2010s reconstruction and I-41 designations

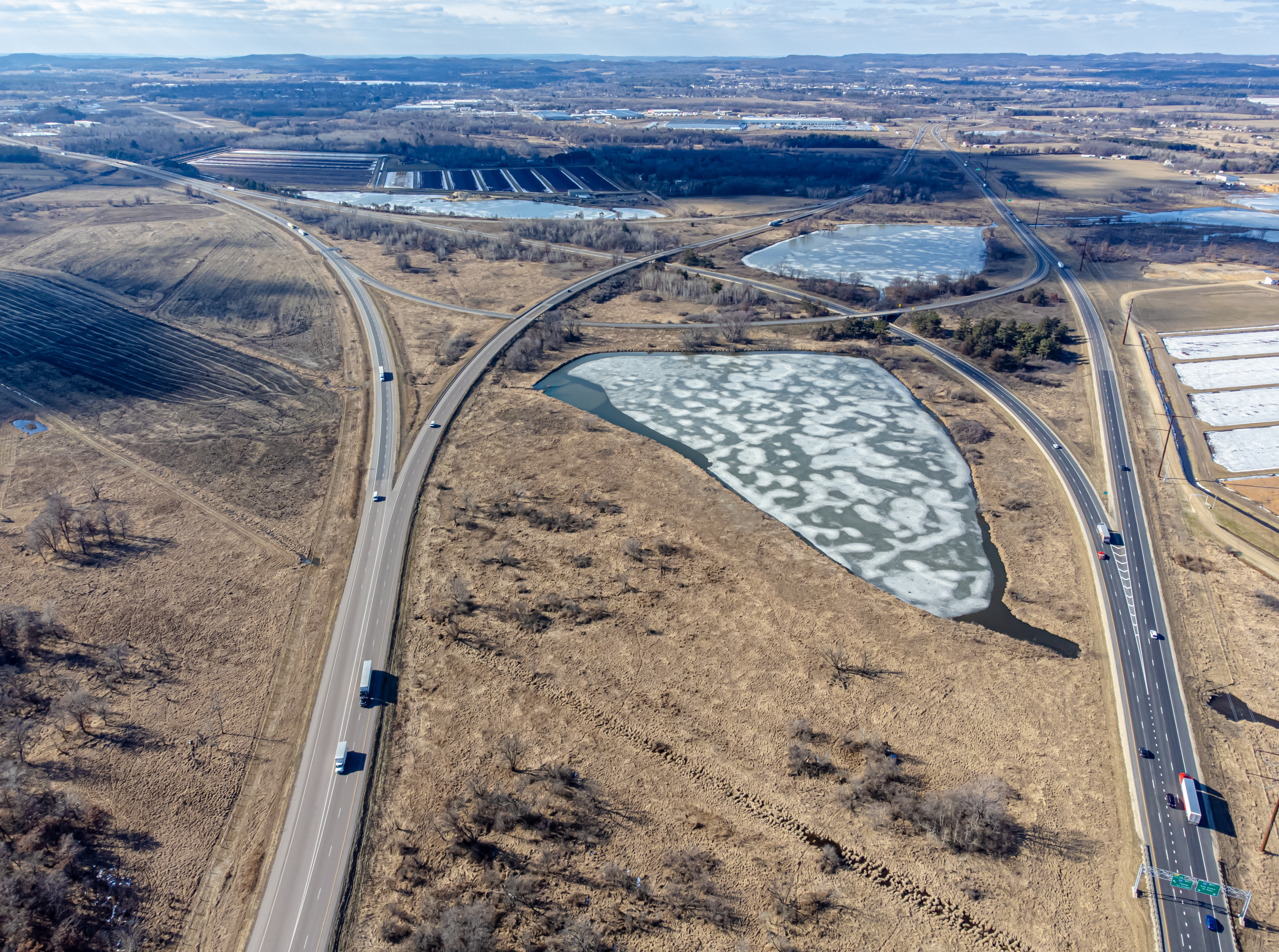
I-90 and I-94 junction near Tomah

The route, cosigned with US Highway 12 (US 12), enters from Minnesota just east of the Twin Cities. The route passes north of Menomonie and south of Eau Claire before turning southeast and heading toward Tomah where it joins I-90. The two Interstates run concurrently for the next 91.76 miles (147.67 km) to Madison. I-94 enters the state as a six-lane facility which reduces to four-lanes at exit 4 (US 12).

I-94 passes by the popular tourist destination of Wisconsin Dells.

The route converges with I-39 63 miles (101 km) southeast of Tomah (near Portage). This concurrency (30 miles [48 km]) is the longest three-route concurrency of the Interstate Highway System and only one of three in existence. The interchanges mark a return to a six-lane configuration.

I-94 turns eastward toward Milwaukee at what is commonly known as the "Badger Interchange" where the three Interstates meet with State Trunk Highway 30 (WIS 30), which was formerly designated as a Madison–Milwaukee highway before I-94 was constructed. The highway returns to four lanes after the interchange traffic merges, then returns to six lanes just west of Waukesha. The highway remains a six-lane facility (with various auxiliary and collector–distributor lanes in Milwaukee at interchanges) east and south of this point, and through Waukesha and Milwaukee counties, is officially designated the East–West Freeway, though very few organizations, including the Wisconsin Department of Transportation's traffic control center in the area actually use that name. I-94 passes through Downtown Milwaukee, turning southbound and joining I-43 for six miles (9.7 km), along a freeway designated from Ozaukee County to the Illinois state line as the North–South Freeway.

I-94 leaves Milwaukee to the south, joining with I-41 at the Mitchell Interchange, remaining signed as an eastbound road to Chicago and a westbound road to Milwaukee despite its completely divergent road direction. These two Interstates run concurrently to the border, passing west of Racine and Kenosha on their way into Illinois toward Chicago. As with all traffic along the southern Lake Michigan corridor, I-94 has moderate to high traffic at all times of day.

=== Speed limits ===
The speed limit on I-94 from the Minnesota border to the Waukesha–Milwaukee county border is 70 mph (110 km/h). Entering Milwaukee County, the limit decreases to 55 mph (89 km/h). The limit is 55 mph (89 km/h) until just west of the Marquette Interchange, where it decreases to 50 mph (80 km/h). This 50-mile-per-hour (80 km/h) limit continues to the Airport Interchange, where it increases to 55 mph (89 km/h). Between Rawson and Drexel avenues, the limit increases to 70 mph (110 km/h) and maintains this limit to the Illinois state line.

== History ==
I-94 was the first section of the Interstate Highway System completed within the state of Wisconsin. This one-mile (1.6 km) section, near Johnson Creek in Jefferson County, was built in 1958. The route was added segment-by-segment over the years and was completed to its current alignment on November 4, 1969. The routing through Milwaukee displaced thousands of residents and businesses. A one-mile (1.6 km) stretch between Lincoln and Greenfield avenues displaced 411 homes and 45 businesses. Milwaukee continues to see millions of dollars in lost tax revenue as a result of the freeway routing through the heart of the city.

From 2004 until 2008, a portion of I-94 in Milwaukee was reconstructed as a part of the Marquette Interchange project. Shortly after from 2009 to 2021, the 35 miles (56 km) of I-94 between the Mitchell Interchange and the Illinois state line were widened from six to eight lanes, including a complete rebuild of the roadway and reconstruction of frontage roads and interchanges including a new design of the Mitchell Interchange in Milwaukee County. This project cost approximately $1.8 billion. Based on the high cost and limited benefits, this project was included in the Public Interest Research Groups list of highway boondoggles.

The Wisconsin stretch of Interstate 94 has been called one of the most dangerous highways in the region by several media outlets, as 115 crashes and 132 fatalities have been reported on the highway over a 10-year stretch of time.

In the 2020s, the entire I-94 corridor was designated as an Alternative Fuel Corridor for electric vehicles.

== Exit list ==
County	Location	mi	km	Exit	Destinations	Notes
St. Croix River		0.00	0.00		I-94 west / US 12 west – St. Paul	Continuation into Minnesota
St. Croix River		0.00	0.00	Minnesota–Wisconsin state line		
St. Croix	Hudson	0.57	0.92	1	WIS 35 north / Alt. I-94 west – Hudson	Western end of WIS 35 concurrency
St. Croix	Hudson				Coulee Road	Westbound entrance only
St. Croix	Hudson	2.13	3.43	2	CTH-F (Carmichael Road)	
St. Croix	Hudson	3.20	5.15	3	WIS 35 south – Hudson, River Falls	Eastern end of WIS 35 concurrency
St. Croix	Hudson	3.96	6.37	4	US 12 east / CTH-U – Somerset	Eastern end of US 12 concurrency
St. Croix	Town of Warren	10.12	16.29	10	WIS 65 – Roberts, River Falls, New Richmond	
St. Croix	Town of Rush River	16.62	26.75	16	CTH-T – Hammond	
St. Croix	Town of Eau Galle	19.66	31.64	19	US 63 – Baldwin, Ellsworth	
St. Croix	Woodville	24.41	39.28	24	CTH-B – Woodville, Spring Valley	
St. Croix	Town of Cady	28.41	45.72	28	WIS 128 – Glenwood City, Elmwood, Spring Valley	
Dunn	Town of Lucas	32.57	52.42	32	CTH-Q – Knapp	
Dunn	Menomonie	41.78	67.24	41	WIS 25 – Menomonie, Barron	
Dunn	Town of Red Cedar	45.65	73.47	45	CTH-B – Menomonie	
Dunn	Town of Elk Mound	52.05	83.77	52	US 12 / WIS 29 to WIS 40 – Chippewa Falls, Wausau, Colfax, Elk Mound	
Eau Claire	Town of Union	58.95	94.87	59	WIS 312 east / CTH-EE to US 12 – Eau Claire, Chippewa Falls, Elk Mound	
Eau Claire	Town of Brunswick	64.79	104.27	65	WIS 37 – Mondovi, Eau Claire	
Eau Claire	Eau Claire	68.65	110.48	68	WIS 93 – Eau Claire, Eleva	
Eau Claire	Town of Washington	70.48– 70.50	113.43– 113.46	70	US 53 – Eau Claire, Chippewa Falls, Superior, Whitehall	Exit 84 on US 53
Eau Claire	Town of Clear Creek	81.03	130.41	81	CTH-HH – Foster, Fall Creek	
Trempealeau	Town of Sumner	88.09	141.77	88	US 10 – Augusta, Osseo, Fairchild	
Jackson	Town of Northfield	98.27	158.15	98	WIS 121 / CTH-FF – Alma Center, Pigeon Falls	
Jackson	Town of Hixton	105.12	169.17	105	WIS 95 / CTH-FF – Hixton, Alma Center	
Jackson	Black River Falls	114.83	184.80	115	US 12 / WIS 27 – Black River Falls, Merrillan	
Jackson	Town of Brockway	116.17	186.96	116	WIS 54 – Black River Falls, Wisconsin Rapids	
Jackson	Town of Millston	127.86	205.77	128	CTH-O – Millston	
Monroe	Town of Lincoln	135.29	217.73	135	CTH-EW – Warrens	
Monroe	Town of La Grange	139.09	223.84	143	US 12 – Tomah	No westbound exit
Monroe	Town of La Grange	143.06	230.23	143	WIS 21 – Necedah, Wyeville	No eastbound exit
Monroe	Town of La Grange	145.05	233.44	145	Industrial Avenue – Tomah	
Monroe	Town of Tomah	146.90	236.41	147	I-90 west – La Crosse, Tomah, Albert Lea	Western end of I-90 concurrency; I-90 exit 45
Monroe	Oakdale	150.40	242.05	48	CTH-PP – Oakdale	Exit numbers follow I-90
Juneau	Camp Douglas	156.83	252.39	55	CTH-C – Camp Douglas, Volk Field	
Juneau	New Lisbon	163.26	262.74	61	WIS 80 – New Lisbon, Necedah	
Juneau	Town of Lemonweir	169.51	272.80	69	WIS 82 – Mauston, Oxford	
Juneau	Lyndon Station	180.77	290.92	79	CTH-HH – Lyndon Station; CTH-N	
Juneau	Town of Lyndon	187.20	301.27	85	US 12 / WIS 16 – Wisconsin Dells	
Sauk	Wisconsin Dells	189.07	304.28	87	WIS 13 – Wisconsin Dells	
Sauk	Lake Delton	191.60	308.35	89	WIS 23 – Lake Delton, Reedsburg	
Sauk	Town of Delton	193.93	312.10	92	US 12 – Baraboo, Lake Delton	
Columbia	Town of Caledonia	207.53	333.99	106	WIS 33 – Portage, Baraboo	
Columbia	Town of Caledonia	209.94– 210.39	337.87– 338.59	108A	WIS 78 – Merrimac	
Columbia	Town of Caledonia	209.94– 210.39	337.87– 338.59	108B	I-39 north – Wausau	Western end of I-39 concurrency
Columbia	Town of Dekorra	217.01	349.24	115	CTH-CS / CTH-J – Poynette, Lake Wisconsin	
Columbia	Town of Arlington	221.00	355.67	119	WIS 60 – Lodi, Arlington	
Dane	Town of Vienna	228.05	367.01	126	CTH-V – Dane, De Forest	
Dane	Community of Windsor	232.26	373.79	131	WIS 19 – Waunakee, Sun Prairie	
Dane	Town of Burke	233.78– 233.82	376.23– 376.30	132	US 51 – Madison, De Forest	
Dane	Madison	237.01– 237.04	381.43– 381.48	135A	US 151 south – Madison	Cloverleaf interchange
Dane	Madison	237.01– 237.04	381.43– 381.48	135B	US 151 north – Sun Prairie	Cloverleaf interchange
Dane	Madison	237.25	381.82	135C	High Crossing Boulevard	Westbound exit and eastbound entrance
Dane	Madison	239.04	384.70	—	I-39 south / I-90 east – Chicago	Eastern end of I-39/I-90 concurrency; eastbound exit and westbound left entrance; westbound access via WIS 30 (exit 240A); I-90 exit 138A
Dane	Madison	239.73	385.81	240	WIS 30 west – Madison	Westbound left exit and eastbound entrance; WIS 30 exit 3B
Dane	Town of Sun Prairie	243.71	392.21	244	CTH-N – Cottage Grove, Sun Prairie	
Dane	Town of Deerfield	249.58	401.66	250	WIS 73 – Marshall, Deerfield	
Jefferson	Town of Lake Mills	258.65	416.26	259	WIS 89 – Lake Mills, Waterloo, Jefferson, Whitewater	
Jefferson	Johnson Creek	266.18	428.38	267	WIS 26 – Johnson Creek, Watertown	
Jefferson	Town of Concord	275.00	442.57	275	CTH-F – Sullivan, Ixonia	Former WIS 135
Jefferson	Town of Concord	276.96	445.72	277	Willow Glen Road	Eastbound exit and westbound entrance
Waukesha	Oconomowoc	281.20	452.55	282	WIS 67 – Dousman, Oconomowoc, Elkhorn	Western terminus of East–West Freeway
Waukesha	Town of Summit	282.77	455.07	283	CTH-P (Sawyer Road)	
Waukesha	Delafield	284.76	458.28	285	CTH-C – Delafield	
Waukesha	Delafield	286.38	460.88	287	WIS 83 – Hartland, Wales, Mukwonago, North Lake	
Waukesha	Town of Delafield	289.90	466.55	290	CTH-SS north – Pewaukee	
Waukesha	Pewaukee	290.81	468.01	291	WIS 318 / CTH-G / CTH-TT – Waukesha, Pewaukee	CTH-TT has been redesignated WIS 318, part of the western Waukesha Bypass
Waukesha	Waukesha	292.36	470.51	293	CTH-T – Waukesha, Pewaukee	Signed as exit 293 westbound
Waukesha	Waukesha	292.73	471.10	293C	WIS 16 west – Pewaukee	Westbound exit and eastbound entrance
Waukesha	Pewaukee	293.89	472.97	294	WIS 164 north / CTH-J south – Waukesha, Pewaukee, Sussex	Western end of WIS 164 concurrency
Waukesha	Pewaukee	294.81	474.45	295	CTH-F – Waukesha, Sussex	
Waukesha	Town of Brookfield	296.68– 296.87	477.46– 477.77	297	US 18 / WIS 164 south / CTH-JJ (Bluemound Road) / Barker Road – Waukesha	Eastern end of WIS 164 concurrency
Waukesha	Brookfield	300.31	483.30	301	CTH-O (Moorland Road)	Signed as exit 301A-B eastbound and exits 301A (Moorland Road south) and 301B (Moorland Road north) westbound
Milwaukee	West Allis	303.41– 303.42	488.29– 488.31	304	WIS 100 (Mayfair Road / 108th Street) – Menomonee Falls	Signed as exit 304A-B eastbound and exits 304A (WIS 100 south) and 304B (WIS 100 north) westbound; exit for Mayfair Mall and Milwaukee County Zoo
Milwaukee	Milwaukee	304.01– 304.13	489.26– 489.45	305A	I-41 south / I-894 east / US 41 south / US 45 south (Zoo Freeway) – Chicago	
Milwaukee	Milwaukee	304.01– 304.13	489.26– 489.45	305B	I-41 north / US 41 north / US 45 north (Zoo Freeway) – Fond du Lac	
Milwaukee	Milwaukee	304.97– 305.00	490.80– 490.85	306	WIS 181 (84th Street)	
Milwaukee	Milwaukee	305.88– 306.03	492.27– 492.51	307A	68th Street, 70th Street	
Milwaukee	Milwaukee	306.55– 306.58	493.34– 493.39	307B	Hawley Road	
Milwaukee	Milwaukee	306.97	494.02	308A	Mitchell Boulevard – VA Center	
Milwaukee	Milwaukee	307.38– 307.43	494.68– 494.76	308B	WIS 175 south (Brewers Boulevard)	
Milwaukee	Milwaukee	307.38– 307.43	494.68– 494.76	308C	WIS 175 north (Stadium Freeway)	
Milwaukee	Milwaukee	308.04	495.74	309A	35th Street	
Milwaukee	Milwaukee	308.66	496.74	309B	26th Street, St. Paul Avenue	Eastbound exit and westbound entrance
Milwaukee	Milwaukee	308.74	496.87	309B	Clybourn Street, 25th Street	Westbound exit and eastbound entrance
Milwaukee	Milwaukee	309.48	498.06	310A	13th Street	Eastbound exit only
Milwaukee	Milwaukee	309.99	498.88	310B	I-43 north (North–South Freeway) – Green Bay	Northern end of I-43 concurrency; I-43 south exit 72D
Milwaukee	Milwaukee	310.16	499.15	310C	I-794 east (East–West Freeway) – Lakefront, Port of Milwaukee	I-794 exit 1C
Milwaukee	Milwaukee	310.60	499.86	311	WIS 59 (National Avenue) / 6th Street	
Milwaukee	Milwaukee	311.17– 311.49	500.78– 501.29	312A	Greenfield Avenue, Lapham Boulevard, Mitchell Street	
Milwaukee	Milwaukee	312.09– 312.18	502.26– 502.41	312B	Becher Street, Lincoln Avenue, Mitchell Street	
Milwaukee	Milwaukee	313.56	504.63	314A	Holt Avenue	
Milwaukee	Milwaukee	314.13	505.54	314B	Howard Avenue	
Milwaukee	Milwaukee	315.40– 315.55	507.59– 507.83	316	I-41 north (Airport Freeway) / I-43 south / I-894 west / US 41 north – Beloit, Madison, Fond du Lac	Northern end of I-41/US 41 concurrency; southern end of I-43 concurrency
Milwaukee	Milwaukee	315.78	508.20	317	CTH-Y (Layton Avenue)	
Milwaukee	Milwaukee	317.17	510.44	318	WIS 119 – General Mitchell International Airport	
Milwaukee	Milwaukee	317.86	511.55	319	CTH-ZZ (College Avenue)	
Milwaukee	Oak Creek	318.82	513.09	320	CTH-BB (Rawson Avenue)	
Milwaukee	Oak Creek	319.83	514.72	321	Drexel Avenue	
Milwaukee	Oak Creek	321.84	517.95	322	WIS 100 (Ryan Road) – Franklin	
Milwaukee	Oak Creek			324	To WIS 241 (27th Street), Elm Road	Interchange opened in mid-2020
Racine	Raymond–Caledonia line	324.10	521.59	325	WIS 241 north (27th Street)	Closed; was westbound exit and eastbound entrance; former US 41 north
Racine	Raymond–Caledonia line	325.04	523.10	326	WIS 241 north (Seven Mile Road) – Franklin	Southern terminus of WIS 241
Racine	Raymond–Caledonia line	326.56	525.55	327	CTH-G – Caledonia	
Racine	Raymond–Caledonia line	328.55	528.75	329	CTH-K – Racine, Caledonia	
Racine	Yorkville–Mount Pleasant line	332.21– 332.25	534.64– 534.70	333	WIS 20 – Waterford, Racine	
Racine	Sylvania	334.22	537.87	335	WIS 11 – Burlington, Racine, Mt. Pleasant	
Racine–Kenosha county line	Kellogg's Corners	336.10	540.90	337	WIS 195 – Mount Pleasant, Somers	Southern terminus of North–South Freeway
Kenosha	Town of Paris	338.12	544.15	339	CTH-E – Somers	
Kenosha	Somers	339.89	547.00	340	WIS 142 / CTH-S – Burlington, Kenosha	
Kenosha	Somers	341.64	549.82	342	WIS 158 – Kenosha	
Kenosha	Kenosha	343.18	552.29	344	WIS 50 – Kenosha, Lake Geneva	
Kenosha	Pleasant Prairie	344.82	554.93	345	CTH-C	
Kenosha	Pleasant Prairie	346.20	557.15	347	WIS 165 / CTH-Q (Lakeview Parkway)	
Kenosha	Pleasant Prairie	348.23	560.42		I-41 south / I-94 east / US 41 south – Chicago	Continuation into Illinois
1.000 mi = 1.609 km; 1.000 km = 0.621 mi: Closed/former; Concurrency terminus; Incomplete access

== Auxiliary routes ==
Two auxiliary routes of I-94 exist in Wisconsin, both are in the Milwaukee metropolitan area. I-794 is a spur in downtown that accesses the southeast suburbs and the Port of Milwaukee. It is known as the East–West Freeway from I-94 to Lincoln Memorial Drive and as the Lake Freeway from there to Carferry Drive. I-894 is a southwest bypass of the city that is known as the Zoo Freeway from the I-94 Zoo Interchange to I-43 at the Hale Interchange and as the Airport Freeway from there to I-94 at the Mitchell Interchange.

Interstate 94
Previous state: Minnesota	Wisconsin	Next state: Illinois
