= Rocky Arbor State Park =

State park in Sauk and Juneau counties, Wisconsin

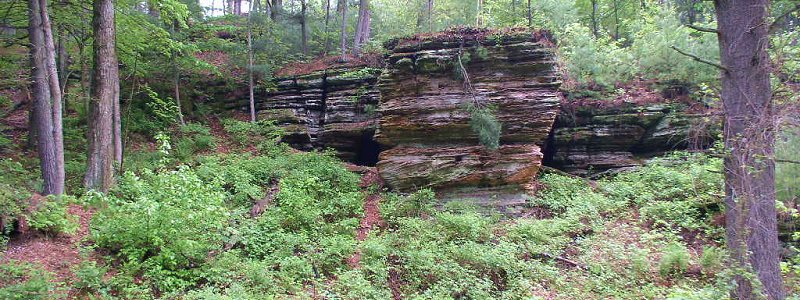

- Location within Wisconsin Location within the United States
- Interactive map of Rocky Arbor State Park
- Location: Wisconsin Dells, Wisconsin, United States
- Coordinates: 43°38′31″N 89°48′21″W
- Area: 244 acres (99 ha)
- Established: 1932
- Administrator: Wisconsin Department of Natural Resources
- Website: Official website
- Wisconsin State Parks

Rocky Arbor State Park is a 244-acre (99 ha) Wisconsin state park in the Wisconsin Dells region. The park was established in 1932 to protect sandstone outcrops eroded into picturesque walls and ledges.

== Natural history ==
The region is formed from Late Cambrian sandstone deposited 500 million years ago at the bottom of shallow inland seas. Much later the Wisconsin River flowed over this tract of land, carving channels into the sandstone. The river has since changed course, now running 1.5 miles (2.4 km) to the east, leaving the rock walls of its former gorge exposed. A small creek now flows through the park, though in the opposite direction as the river once did.

== Gallery ==
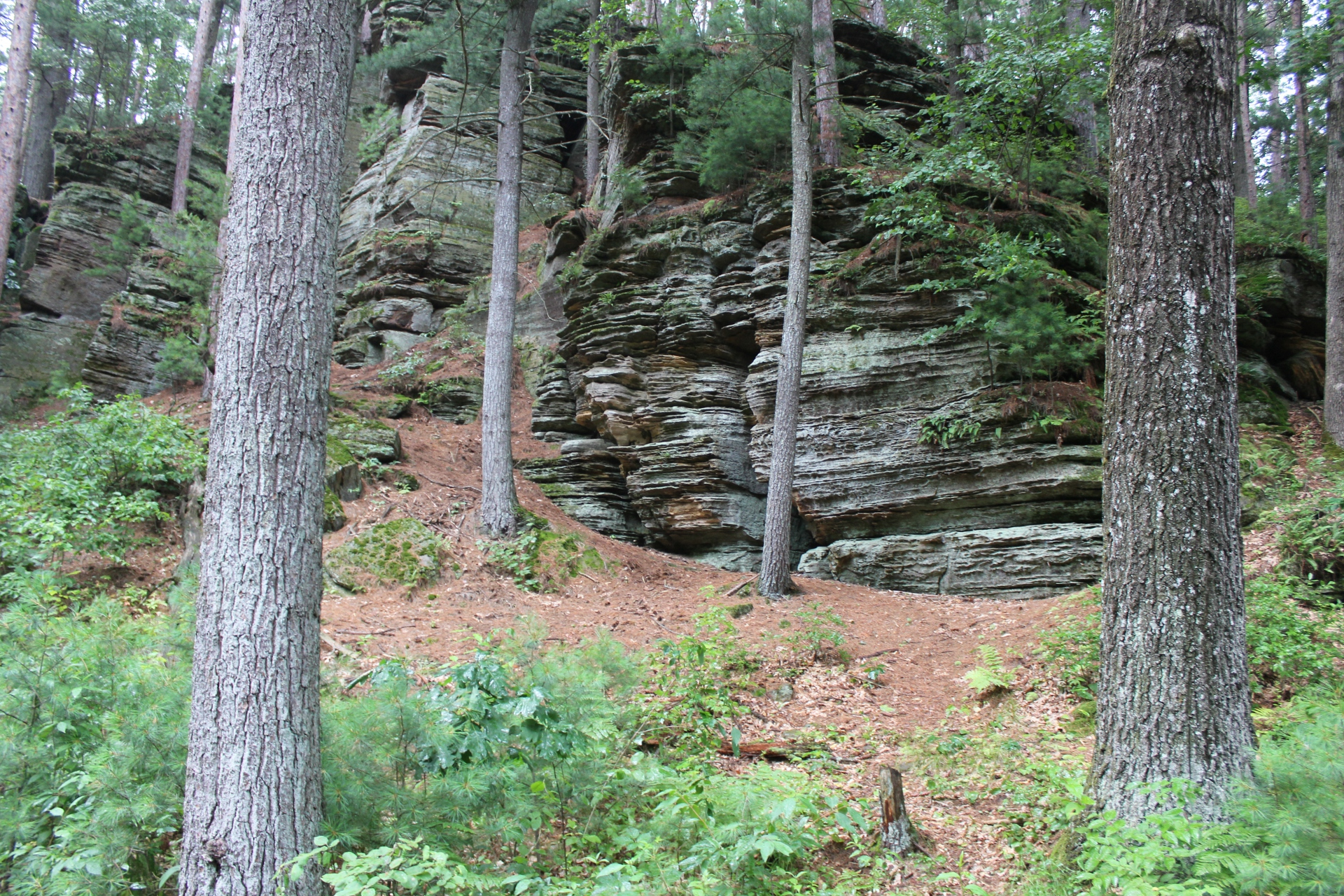
Outcrop

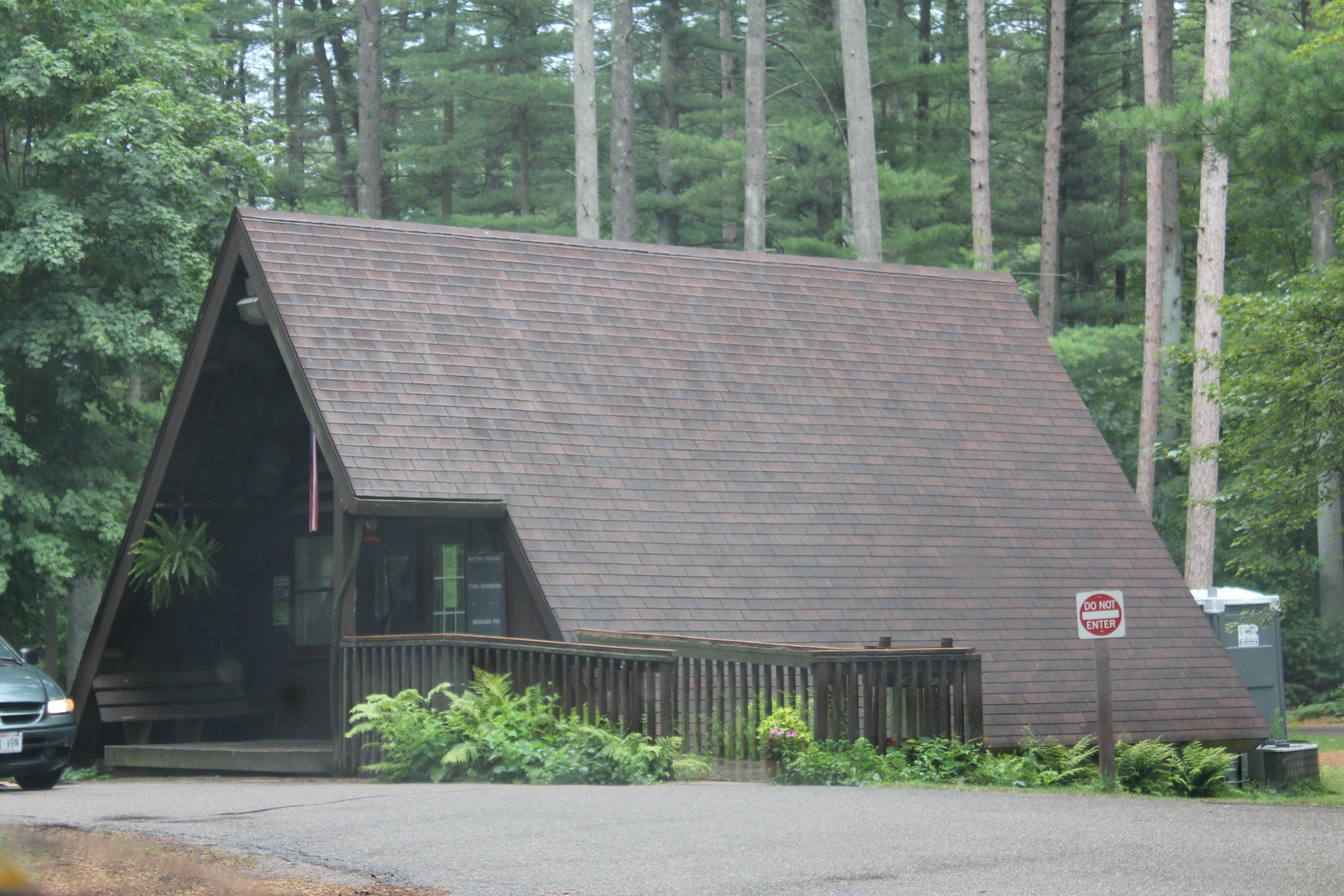
Ranger Station

== Recreation ==
Situated in a major tourist area, Rocky Arbor State Park has well-developed visitor amenities despite its small size. There is a campground with 89 campsites (18 of them with electrical hookups), showers, flush toilets, a playground, dump station, and picnic area. A single loop trail provides views of the rock ledges, with a spur trail to the campground. The park is open to vehicle traffic only in the summer. During the off-season visitors can park at the gate and enter the grounds on foot.

== Climate ==
Rocky Arbor State Park

Climate chart (precipitation, max. and min. temperature)
J	F	M	A	M	J	J	A	S	O	N	D
63 −9 −13	67 −6 −14	84 4 −7	161 18 1	147 21 9	193 26 15	80 27 17	97 25 18	81 21 13	104 15 5	63 6 −1	63 −5 −9
- █ Average max. and min. temperatures in °C
- █ Precipitation totals in mm
Imperial conversion
J	F	M	A	M	J	J	A	S	O	N	D
2.5 16 9	2.6 21 7	3.3 39 19	6.3 64 34	5.8 70 48	7.6 79 59	3.1 81 63	3.8 77 64	3.2 70 55	4.1 59 41	2.5 43 30	2.5 23 16
- █ Average max. and min. temperatures in °F
- █ Precipitation totals in inches
