= Mentor, Wisconsin =

- Town
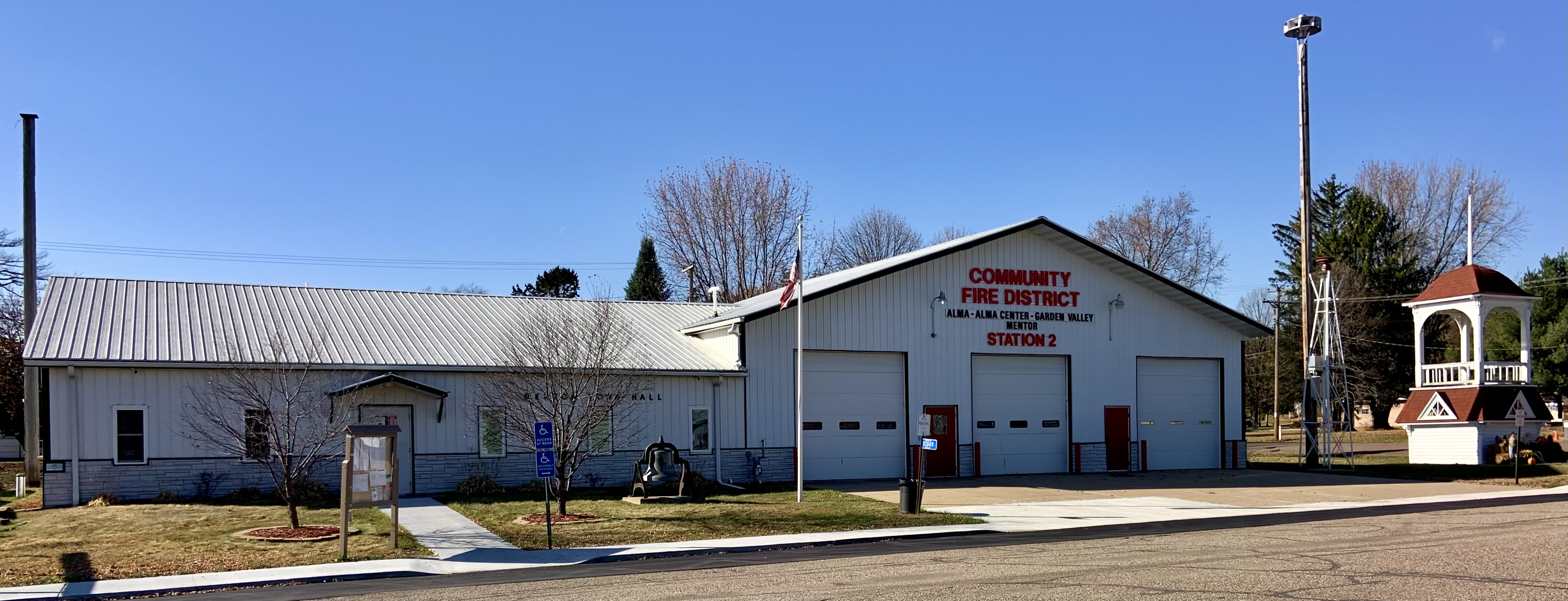
- Town hall in Humbird

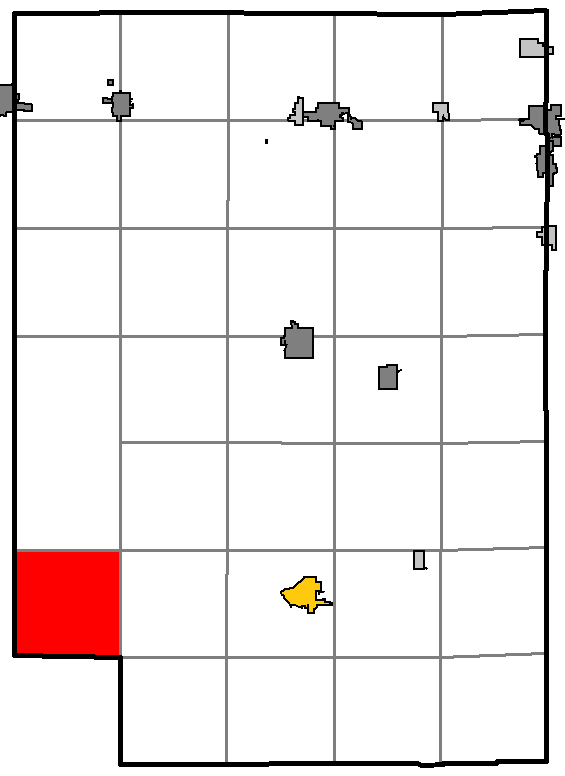
- Location of Mentor, Clark County

- Location of Clark County, Wisconsin
- Coordinates: 44°33′17″N 90°52′53″W
- Country: United States
- State: Wisconsin
- County: Clark

Area
  - Total: 35.8 sq mi (92.8 km^{2})
  - Land: 35.7 sq mi (92.5 km^{2})
  - Water: 0.12 sq mi (0.3 km^{2})
- Elevation: 1,030 ft (314 m)

Population (2020)
  - Total: 546
  - Density: 15.3/sq mi (5.90/km^{2})
- Time zone: UTC-6 (Central (CST))
  - Summer (DST): UTC-5 (CDT)
- Area codes: 715 & 534
- FIPS code: 55-51125
- GNIS feature ID: 1583698
- Website: https://townofmentorwi.gov/

Mentor is a town in Clark County in the U.S. state of Wisconsin. The population was 546 at the 2020 census. The unincorporated community of Humbird is located in the town.

== Geography ==
According to the United States Census Bureau, the town has a total area of 35.8 square miles (92.8 km^{2}), of which 35.7 square miles (92.5 km^{2}) is land and 0.1 square miles (0.3 km^{2}; 0.31%) is water.

== Demographics ==
As of the census of 2000, there were 570 people, 223 households, and 165 families residing in the town. The population density was 16.0 people per square mile (6.2/km^{2}). There were 286 housing units at an average density of 8.0 per square mile (3.1/km^{2}). The racial makeup of the town was 98.42% White, 0.18% African American, 1.05% Native American, and 0.35% from two or more races. Hispanic or Latino people of any race were 0.70% of the population.

There were 223 households, out of which 30.5% had children under the age of 18 living with them, 61.9% were married couples living together, 6.7% had a female householder with no husband present, and 26.0% were non-families. 22.4% of all households were made up of individuals, and 7.6% had someone living alone who was 65 years of age or older. The average household size was 2.56 and the average family size was 2.98.

In the town, the population was spread out, with 26.3% under the age of 18, 7.9% from 18 to 24, 27.2% from 25 to 44, 24.4% from 45 to 64, and 14.2% who were 65 years of age or older. The median age was 39 years. For every 100 females, there were 105.8 males. For every 100 females age 18 and over, there were 106.9 males.

The median income for a household in the town was $36,125, and the median income for a family was $42,500. Males had a median income of $26,836 versus $19,318 for females. The per capita income for the town was $16,661. About 7.0% of families and 10.8% of the population were below the poverty line, including 18.1% of those under age 18 and none of those age 65 or over.
