= Cleveland, Jackson County, Wisconsin =

Cleveland, Wisconsin
- Town
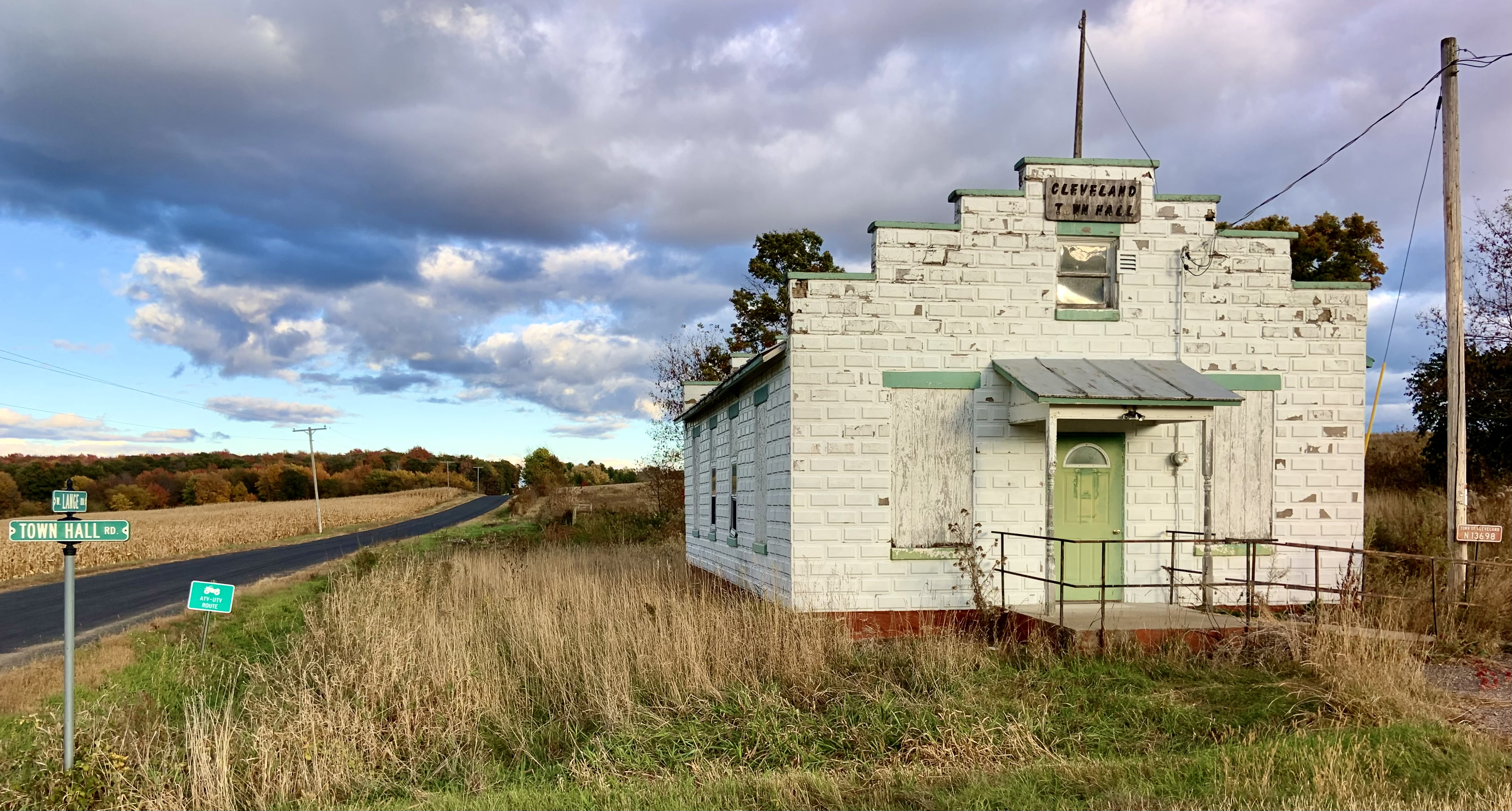
- Town hall

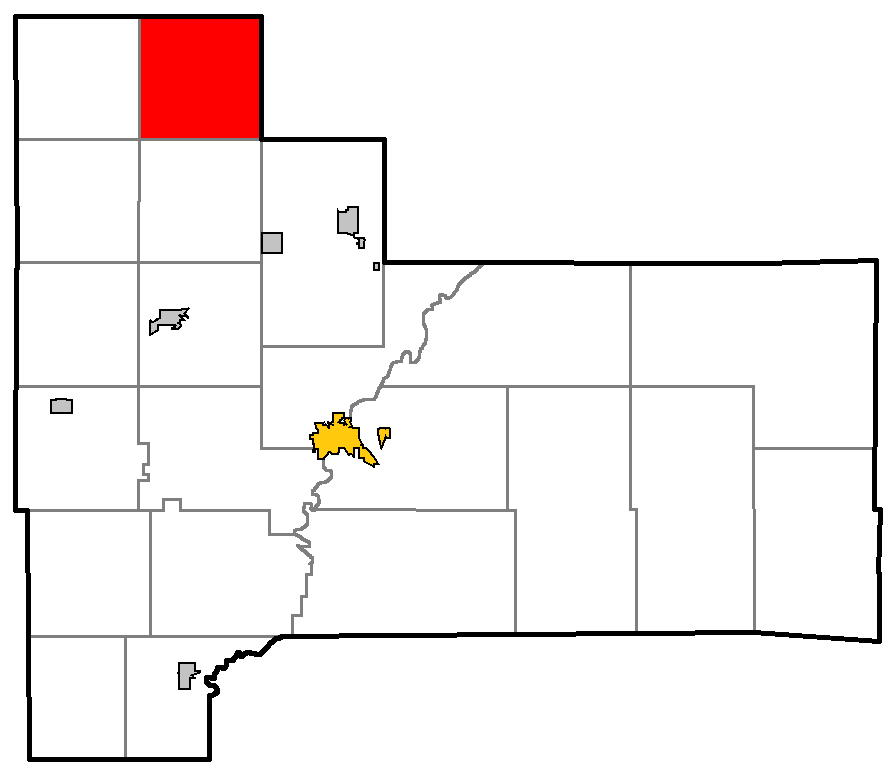
- Location of Cleveland, Jackson County

- Location of Jackson County, Wisconsin
- Coordinates: 44°34′31″N 90°58′15″W
- Country: United States
- State: Wisconsin
- County: Jackson

Area
  - Total: 35.9 sq mi (92.9 km^{2})
  - Land: 35.9 sq mi (92.9 km^{2})
  - Water: 0 sq mi (0.0 km^{2})
- Elevation: 1,171 ft (357 m)

Population (2020)
  - Total: 530
  - Density: 15/sq mi (5.7/km^{2})
- Time zone: UTC-6 (Central (CST))
  - Summer (DST): UTC-5 (CDT)
- FIPS code: 55-15375
- GNIS feature ID: 1582975
- Website: https://townofcleveland.org/

Cleveland is a town in Jackson County, Wisconsin, United States. The population was 530 at the 2020 census.

== History ==
Cleveland is located in the northwestern portion of the county and was formed in 1886 out of the northern portion of the town of Garden Valley.

== Geography ==
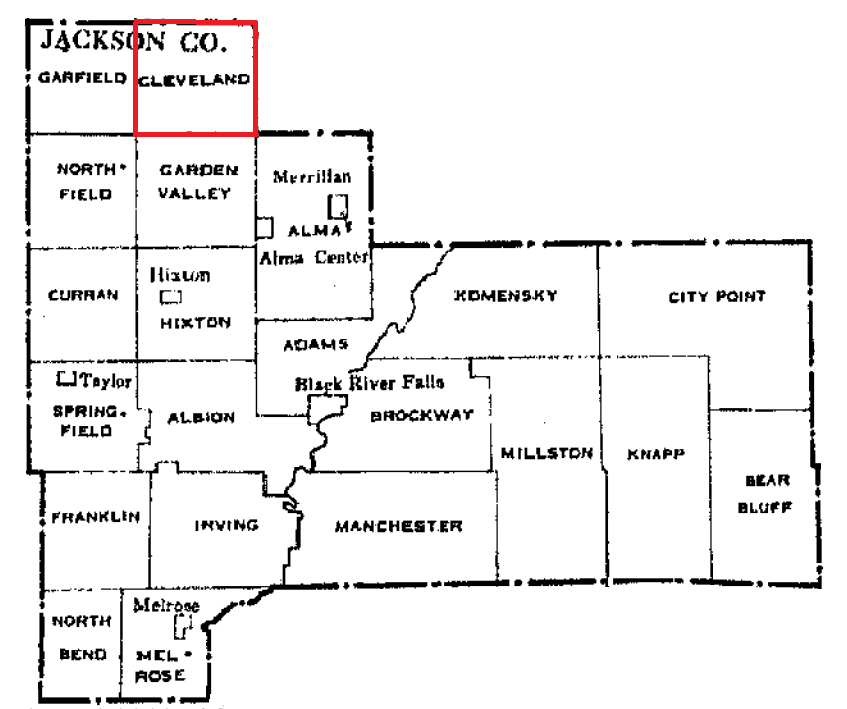
Location of Cleveland highlighted in red on map of Jackson County towns

According to the United States Census Bureau, the town has a total area of 35.9 square miles (92.9 km^{2}), all land.

== Demographics ==
Historical population
Census	Pop.	Note	%±
2000	438		—
2010	481		9.8%

As of the census of 2000, there were 438 people, 169 households, and 116 families residing in the town. The population density was 12.2 people per square mile (4.7/km^{2}). There were 188 housing units at an average density of 5.2 per square mile (2.0/km^{2}). The racial makeup of the town was 94.98% White, 2.05% Native American, 1.37% Asian, 0.46% from other races, and 1.14% from two or more races. Hispanic or Latino of any race were 1.37% of the population.

There were 169 households, out of which 28.4% had children under the age of 18 living with them, 56.8% were married couples living together, 4.7% had a female householder with no husband present, and 30.8% were non-families. 24.3% of all households were made up of individuals, and 11.8% had someone living alone who was 65 years of age or older. The average household size was 2.59 and the average family size was 3.09.

In the town, the population was spread out, with 26.3% under the age of 18, 5.3% from 18 to 24, 27.2% from 25 to 44, 26.0% from 45 to 64, and 15.3% who were 65 years of age or older. The median age was 41 years. For every 100 females, there were 113.7 males. For every 100 females age 18 and over, there were 113.9 males.

The median income for a household in the town was $43,125, and the median income for a family was $45,250. Males had a median income of $31,094 versus $21,429 for females. The per capita income for the town was $18,767. About 3.3% of families and 5.4% of the population were below the poverty line, including 5.5% of those under age 18 and 5.8% of those age 65 or over.
