= Warren, St. Croix County, Wisconsin =

Warren, Wisconsin
- Town
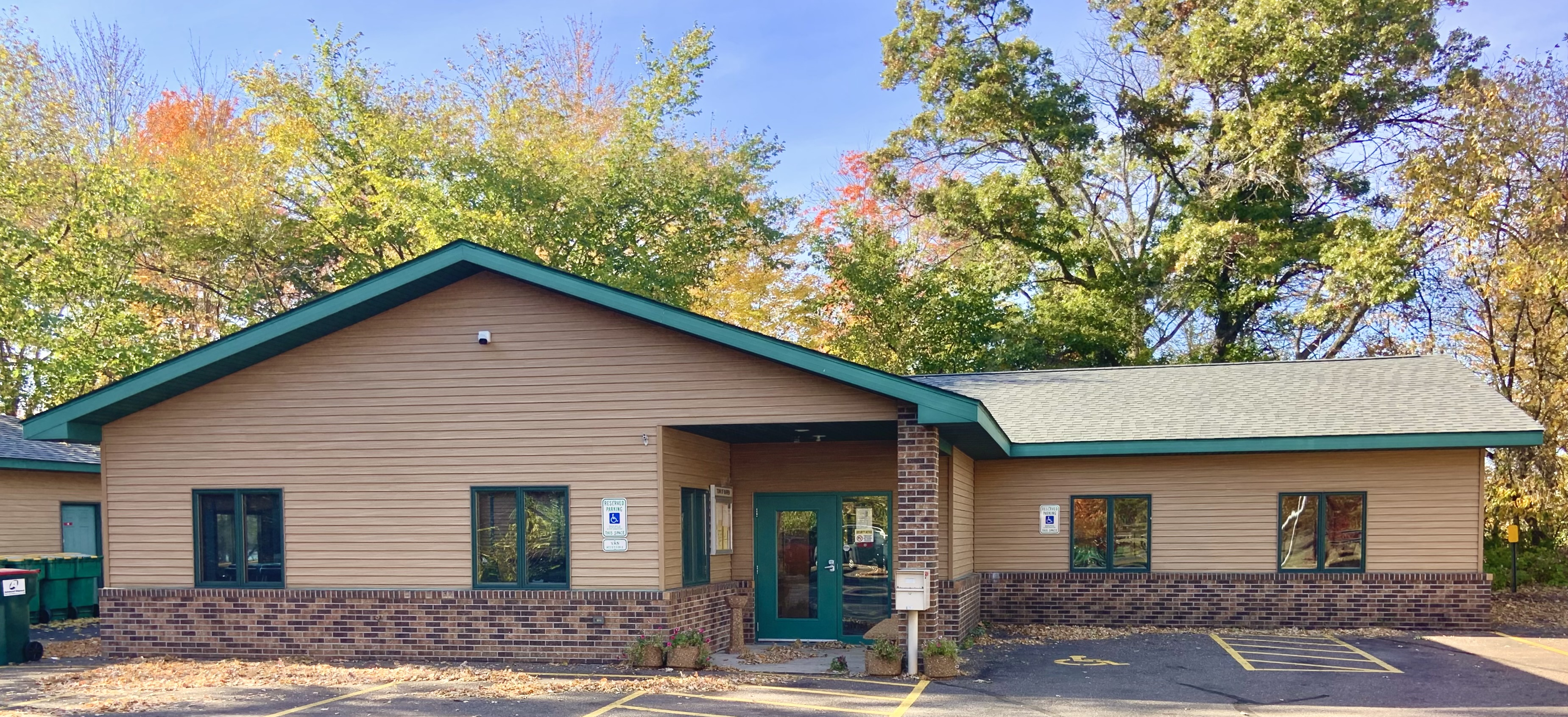
- Town hall

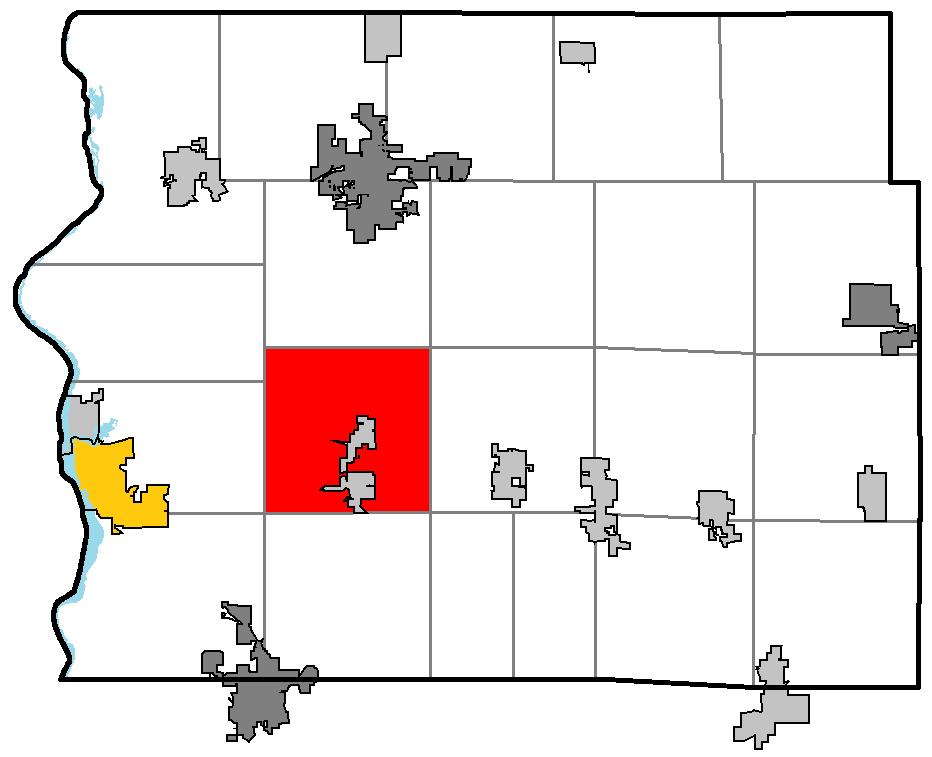
- Location of Warren, within St. Croix County

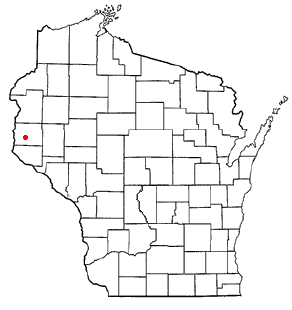
- Location of Warren, St. Croix County, Wisconsin
- Coordinates: 44°59′26″N 92°33′20″W
- Country: United States
- State: Wisconsin
- County: St. Croix

Area
  - Total: 35.3 sq mi (91.4 km^{2})
  - Land: 34.8 sq mi (90.1 km^{2})
  - Water: 0.50 sq mi (1.3 km^{2})
- Elevation: 1,033 ft (315 m)

Population (2020)
  - Total: 1,733
  - Density: 49.8/sq mi (19.2/km^{2})
- Time zone: UTC-6 (Central (CST))
  - Summer (DST): UTC-5 (CDT)
- Area codes: 715 & 534
- FIPS code: 55-83400
- GNIS feature ID: 1584345
- Website: https://townofwarrensccwi.gov/

Warren is a town in St. Croix County, Wisconsin, United States. The population was 1,733 at the 2020 census. The village of Roberts is located within the town.

== Geography ==
According to the United States Census Bureau, the town has a total area of 35.3 square miles (91.4 km^{2}), of which 34.8 square miles (90.1 km^{2}) is land and 0.5 square mile (1.3 km^{2}) (1.47%) is water.

== Demographics ==
Historical population
| Census | Pop. | Note | %± |
|---|---|---|---|
| 2000 | 1,320 | | — |
| 2010 | 1,591 | | 20.5% |
| 2020 | 1,733 | | 8.9% |

As of the census of 2000, there were 1,320 people, 426 households, and 359 families residing in the town. The population density was 37.9 inhabitants per square mile (14.6/km^{2}). There were 437 housing units at an average density of 12.6 per square mile (4.9/km^{2}). The racial makeup of the town was 98.94% White, 0.23% African American, 0.08% Native American, 0.38% Asian, and 0.38% from two or more races. Hispanic or Latino of any race were 0.45% of the population.

There were 426 households, out of which 46.2% had children under the age of 18 living with them, 76.5% were married couples living together, 4.2% had a female householder with no husband present, and 15.7% were non-families. 10.3% of all households were made up of individuals, and 2.6% had someone living alone who was 65 years of age or older. The average household size was 3.10 and the average family size was 3.38.

In the town, the population was spread out, with 31.3% under the age of 18, 7.0% from 18 to 24, 31.5% from 25 to 44, 24.0% from 45 to 64, and 6.2% who were 65 years of age or older. The median age was 36 years. For every 100 females, there were 108.2 males. For every 100 females age 18 and over, there were 109.5 males.

The median income for a household in the town was $68,452, and the median income for a family was $71,146. Males had a median income of $45,167 versus $36,080 for females. The per capita income for the town was $25,120. About 2.5% of families and 3.9% of the population were below the poverty line, including 3.1% of those under age 18 and 8.5% of those age 65 or over.
