= Hammond, Wisconsin =

- Village
- Motto: Heart of St. Croix County
- Location of Hammond in St. Croix County, Wisconsin

- Location within the state of Wisconsin Location within the United States Hammond (North America)
- Coordinates: 44°59′59″N 92°25′34″W
- Country: United States
- State: Wisconsin
- County: St. Croix

Government
  - Type: Village Board

Area
  - Total: 2.16 sq mi (5.59 km^{2})
  - Land: 2.16 sq mi (5.59 km^{2})
  - Water: 0 sq mi (0.00 km^{2})
- Elevation: 1,089 ft (332 m)

Population (2020)
  - Total: 1,873
  - Density: 868/sq mi (335/km^{2})
- Time zone: UTC-6 (Central (CST))
  - Summer (DST): UTC-5 (CDT)
- Area codes: 715 & 534
- FIPS code: 55-32350
- GNIS feature ID: 1581640
- Website: www.hammondwi.org

Hammond is a village in St. Croix County, Wisconsin, United States. The population was 1,873 at the 2020 census. The village is within the Town of Hammond. Hammond was home to the Running of the Llamas.

== History ==
Hammond was named in 1856 for R. B. Hammond, an original owner of the town site. A post office called Hammond has been in operation since 1858.

== Geography ==
According to the United States Census Bureau, the village has an area of 2.15 square miles (5.57 km^{2}), all land.

Hammond is located at 44°58′32″N 92°26′7″W (44.975598, -92.435452).

Hammond is along U.S. Highway 12. Other main routes include County Roads J, T, and TT, Broadway Street, and Davis Street. Interstate 94 is nearby.

== Demographics ==
Historical population
Census	Pop.	Note	%±
1880	361		—
1890	388		7.5%
1900	404		4.1%
1910	408		1.0%
1920	368		−9.8%
1930	395		7.3%
1940	467		18.2%
1950	554		18.6%
1960	645		16.4%
1970	768		19.1%
1980	991		29.0%
1990	1,097		10.7%
2000	1,153		5.1%
2010	1,922		66.7%
2020	1,873		−2.5%
U.S. Decennial Census

=== 2010 census ===
As of the census of 2010, there were 1,922 people, 715 households, and 499 families living in the village. The population density was 894.0 inhabitants per square mile (345.2/km^{2}). There were 773 housing units at an average density of 359.5 per square mile (138.8/km^{2}). The racial makeup of the village was 96.0% White, 0.5% African American, 0.4% Native American, 0.7% Asian, 0.1% Pacific Islander, 0.6% from other races, and 1.8% from two or more races. Hispanic or Latino of any race were 2.9% of the population.

There were 715 households, of which 40.7% had children under the age of 18 living with them, 54.8% were married couples living together, 9.2% had a female householder with no husband present, 5.7% had a male householder with no wife present, and 30.2% were non-families. 23.9% of all households were made up of individuals, and 7.4% had someone living alone who was 65 years of age or older. The average household size was 2.62 and the average family size was 3.08.

The median age in the village was 33.1 years. 29.3% of residents were under the age of 18; 6.7% were between the ages of 18 and 24; 32.7% were from 25 to 44; 22.3% were from 45 to 64; and 9.1% were 65 years of age or older. The gender makeup of the village was 49.7% male and 50.3% female.

=== 2000 census ===
As of the census of 2000, there were 1,153 people, 433 households, and 313 families living in the village. The population density was 840.2 inhabitants per square mile (324.4/km^{2}). There were 438 housing units at an average density of 319.2 per square mile (123.2/km^{2}). The racial makeup of the village was 98.79% White, 0.09% Black or African American, 0.17% Asian, and 0.95% from two or more races. 0.26% of the population were Hispanic or Latino of any race.

There were 433 households, out of which 39.7% had children under the age of 18 living with them, 56.4% were married couples living together, 11.8% had a female householder with no husband present, and 27.7% were non-families. 20.6% of all households were made up of individuals, and 7.6% had someone living alone who was 65 years of age or older. The average household size was 2.55 and the average family size was 2.95.

In the village, the population was spread out, with 26.5% under the age of 18, 9.5% from 18 to 24, 32.1% from 25 to 44, 18.3% from 45 to 64, and 13.5% who were 65 years of age or older. The median age was 34 years. For every 100 females, there were 88.4 males. For every 100 females age 18 and over, there were 88.6 males.

The median income for a household in the village was $45,789, and the median income for a family was $54,722. Males had a median income of $37,337 versus $27,031 for females. The per capita income for the village was $19,002. About 2.5% of families and 3.5% of the population were below the poverty line, including 3.1% of those under age 18 and 4.6% of those age 65 or over.

== Education ==
St. Croix Central Middle School and High School are in Hammond. St. Croix Elementary School is in the neighboring community of Roberts.
