= Wisconsin Highway 30 =

Highway in Wisconsin

State Trunk Highway 30
- WIS 30 highlighted in red

Route information
- Maintained by WisDOT
- Length: 3.43 mi (5.52 km)

Major junctions
- West end: US 151 in Madison
- US 51 in Madison
- East end: I-39 / I-90 / I-94 in Madison

Location
- Country: United States
- State: Wisconsin
- Counties: Dane

Highway system
- Wisconsin State Trunk Highway System; Interstate; US; State; Scenic; Rustic
← WIS 29	→ WIS 31

State Trunk Highway 30 (often called Highway 30, STH-30 or WIS 30) is a state highway in the U.S. state of Wisconsin. Less than 3.5 miles (5.6 km) in length, it runs west–east in suburban Madison as a connector freeway between Interstate 39 (I-39), I-90, and I-94 at the Badger Interchange to U.S. Highway 151 (US 151} east of Downtown Madison. This section is all that remains of the highway that stood in 1964 after I-94 was commissioned. This is the second alignment of the route number—the first ran between Platteville and Readstown.

== Route description ==
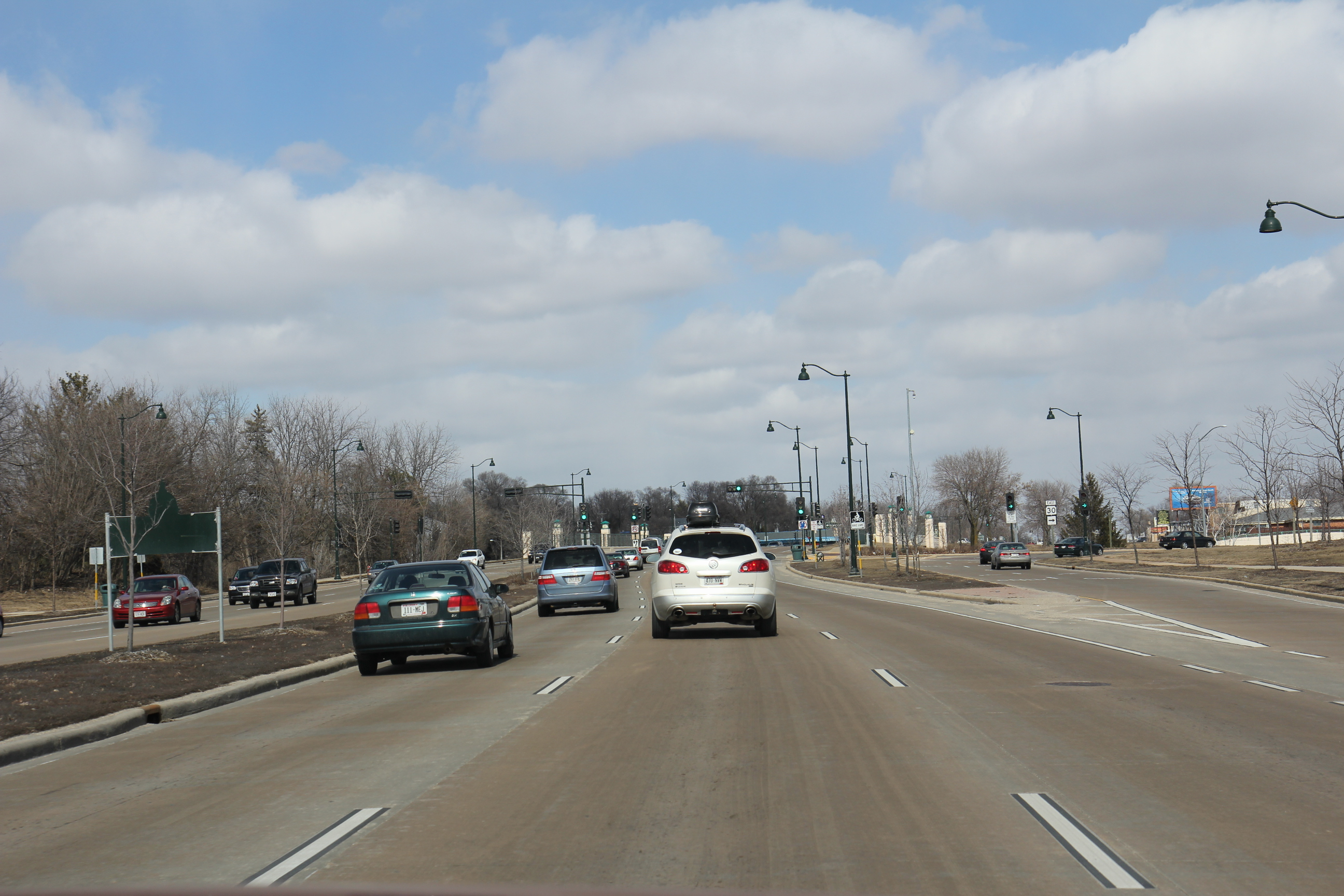
Western terminus (right) from US 151

WIS 30 is a freeway for its entire length and lies completely within the city of Madison. At its western terminus it has a junction with US 151 at a folded diamond interchange. West of the freeway, the road becomes Aberg Avenue which provides a shortcut to WIS 113 north, providing a near-direct through route to Dane County Regional Airport to the north via International Lane. WIS 30 has three interchanges between termini: one at Fair Oaks Avenue, one at Stoughton Road (US 51) and a half-diamond at North Thompson Drive (CTH-T). The Thompson Drive interchange features roundabouts at the ramp junctions with the crossing street. WIS 30's eastern end lies at its junction with I-39, I-90 and I-94 at what is commonly known as the Badger Interchange. The roadway continues as I-94 east, heading towards Milwaukee. The interchanges are numbered sequentially from west to east.

== History ==
From 1924 until the completion of the section of I-94 between Madison and Milwaukee in 1965, WIS 30 was the main route between the two largest cities in the state. WIS 30 ran from the Wisconsin State Capitol along King Street east to Wisconsin Avenue in downtown Milwaukee, along with WIS 19. The route of WIS 30 had several different alignments during that time, all of which generally paralleled the current routing of I-94.

== Exit list ==
The entire highway is in Madison, Dane County.

mi	km	Exit	Destinations	Notes
0.00	0.00	1A	US 151 (East Washington Avenue)	Western terminus; road continues as Aberg Avenue
0.26	0.42	1B	Fair Oaks Avenue	
0.5	0.80	1C	US 51 (Stoughton Road)	
1.4	2.3	2	CTH-T (Thompson Drive)	Eastbound exit and westbound entrance
2.1	3.4	3A	I-39 south / I-90 east – Janesville, Chicago	Left exit signed as exit 240A westbound, left entrance eastbound; I-90 west exits 138A-B
2.1	3.4	3B	I-39 north / I-90 west / I-94 west – Wisconsin Dells	Eastbound left exit and westbound entrance; I-90 east exit 138B
2.3	3.7		I-94 east – Milwaukee	Eastern terminus; I-94 exit 240
1.000 mi = 1.609 km; 1.000 km = 0.621 mi: Incomplete access
