= Wisconsin Highway 37 =

State highway in Wisconsin, United States

State Trunk Highway 37
- WIS 37 highlighted in red

Route information
- Maintained by WisDOT
- Length: 42.67 mi (68.67 km)
- Existed: 1918–present

Major junctions
- South end: WIS 35 in Alma
- WIS 88 south of Mondovi; US 10 in Mondovi; WIS 85 southwest of Eau Claire; I-94 in Eau Claire
- North end: US 12 in Eau Claire

Location
- Country: United States
- State: Wisconsin
- Counties: Buffalo, Eau Claire

Highway system
- Wisconsin State Trunk Highway System; Interstate; US; State; Scenic; Rustic
← WIS 36	→ WIS 38

State Trunk Highway 37 (often called Highway 37, STH-37 or WIS 37) is a 42.67-mile (68.67 km) state highway in Buffalo and Eau Claire counties in the west-central area of the US state of Wisconsin that runs generally north-northeasterly from Alma to Eau Claire. The southern 23 miles (37 km) from Mondovi (the only significant settlement along the course of the highway) to Alma generally follows the course of the Buffalo River.

== Route description ==
WIS 37 closely follows in a south-southwest to north-northeast direction. WIS 37 begins at Wisconsin Highway 35/Great River Road in Alma. It then meanders in the northeast direction, connecting multiple county trunk highways along the way. South of Mondovi, it intersects Wisconsin Highway 88. In Mondovi, it travels briefly eastward, concurrent with U.S. Route 10 before branching off north. Continuing north, it then intersects with Wisconsin Highway 85, meets Interstate 94 at a partial cloverleaf interchange, and then intersects U.S. Route 12 (US 12), at the northern terminus of WIS 37.

== History ==
Since its formation around 1918, WIS 37 did not undergo a significant change. Initially, its northern terminus was in downtown Eau Claire. Since the 1940s, it no longer ended in downtown, but instead at a US 12 bypass.

== Major intersections ==
County	Location	mi	km	Destinations	Notes
Buffalo	Alma	0.0	0.0	WIS 35 / Great River Road – Alma, Nelson	Southern terminus
Buffalo	Town of Mondovi			WIS 88 south – Gilmanton	Northern end of WIS 88
Buffalo	Mondovi			CTH-H south (S. Eau Claire Street)	Southern end of CTH-H concurrency
Buffalo	Mondovi			US 10 west (W. Main Street) / CTH-H north (N. Eau Claire Street) – Durand	Southern end of US 10 concurrency; northern end of CTH-H concurrency
Buffalo	Mondovi			US 10 west (E. Main Street) – Eleva	Northern end of US 10 concurrency
Eau Claire	Town of Brunswick			WIS 85 west – Durand	
Eau Claire	Brunswick–Eau Claire line			I-94 – St. Paul, Madison	Exit 65 on I-94
Eau Claire	Eau Claire	42.67	68.67	US 12 (W. Clairemont Avenue) / Hendrickson Drive – UW Eau Claire, Downtown, Carson Park, Elk Mound	Northern terminus; roadway continues as Hendrickson Drive
1.000 mi = 1.609 km; 1.000 km = 0.621 mi: Concurrency terminus
