= Milton, Wisconsin (disambiguation) =

Milton, Wisconsin is a city in Rock County, Wisconsin.

Milton can also refer to:

- Milton, Buffalo County, Wisconsin, a town
- Milton, Rock County, Wisconsin, a town
