= Hammergren =

Hammergren is a surname. Notable people with the surname include:

- David I. Hammergren (1875–1944), American politician
- John Hammergren (born 1959), American businessman

== See also ==
- Hammargren
