= Gilmanton =

Gilmanton is the name of several places in the United States:

- Gilmanton, New Hampshire, a town
- Gilmanton, Wisconsin, a town in Buffalo County
  - Gilmanton (community), Wisconsin, an unincorporated community in the town of Gilmanton
- Gilmanton Township, Benton County, Minnesota
