= Czechville, Wisconsin =

- Unincorporated community
- Location within Wisconsin Location within the United States
- Coordinates: 44°11′14″N 91°46′25″W
- Country: United States
- State: Wisconsin
- County: Buffalo
- Town: Milton
- Elevation: 679 ft (207 m)
- Time zone: UTC-6 (Central (CST))
  - Summer (DST): UTC-5 (CDT)
- Area codes: 715 & 534
- GNIS feature ID: 1577566

Czechville (/ˈtʃɛkvɪl/ CHEK-vil) is an unincorporated community located in the town of Milton, in Buffalo County, Wisconsin, United States. Czechville is located at the junction of Wisconsin highways 35 and 88, 4 miles (6.4 km) southeast of Cochrane.
