= Milton, Buffalo County, Wisconsin =

Milton, Wisconsin
- Town
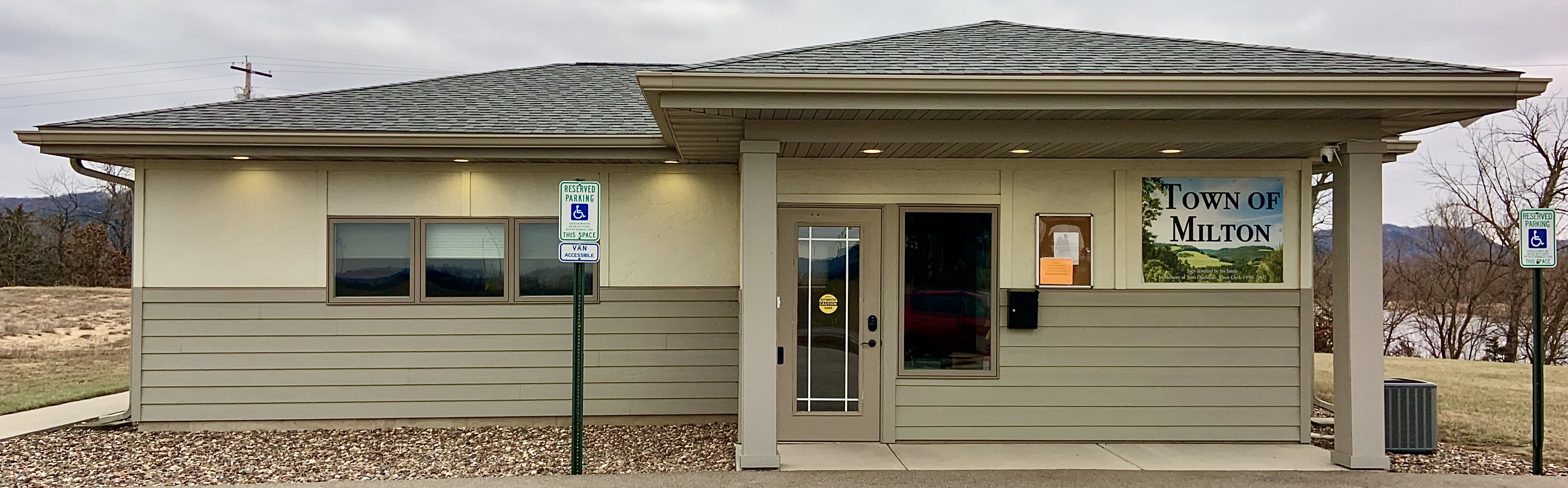
- Town hall

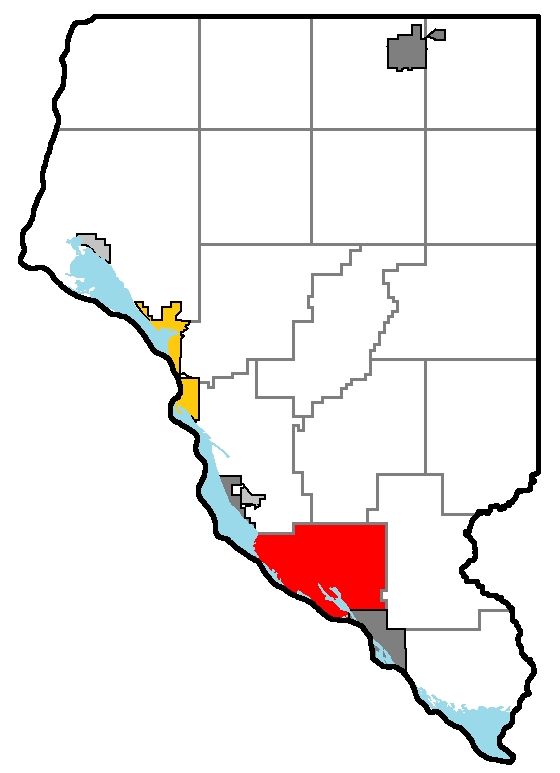
- Location of Milton, Buffalo County

- Location of Buffalo County, Wisconsin
- Coordinates: 44°10′14″N 91°45′48″W
- Country: United States
- State: Wisconsin
- County: Buffalo

Area
  - Total: 29.5 sq mi (76.5 km^{2})
  - Land: 21.7 sq mi (56.2 km^{2})
  - Water: 7.8 sq mi (20.3 km^{2})
- Elevation: 712 ft (217 m)

Population (2020)
  - Total: 541
  - Density: 24.9/sq mi (9.63/km^{2})
- Time zone: UTC-6 (Central (CST))
  - Summer (DST): UTC-5 (CDT)
- FIPS code: 55-52175
- GNIS feature ID: 1583721
- Website: townofmiltonwi.gov

Milton is a town in Buffalo County in the U.S. state of Wisconsin. The population was 541 at the 2020 census. The unincorporated community of Czechville is located in the town.

== Geography ==
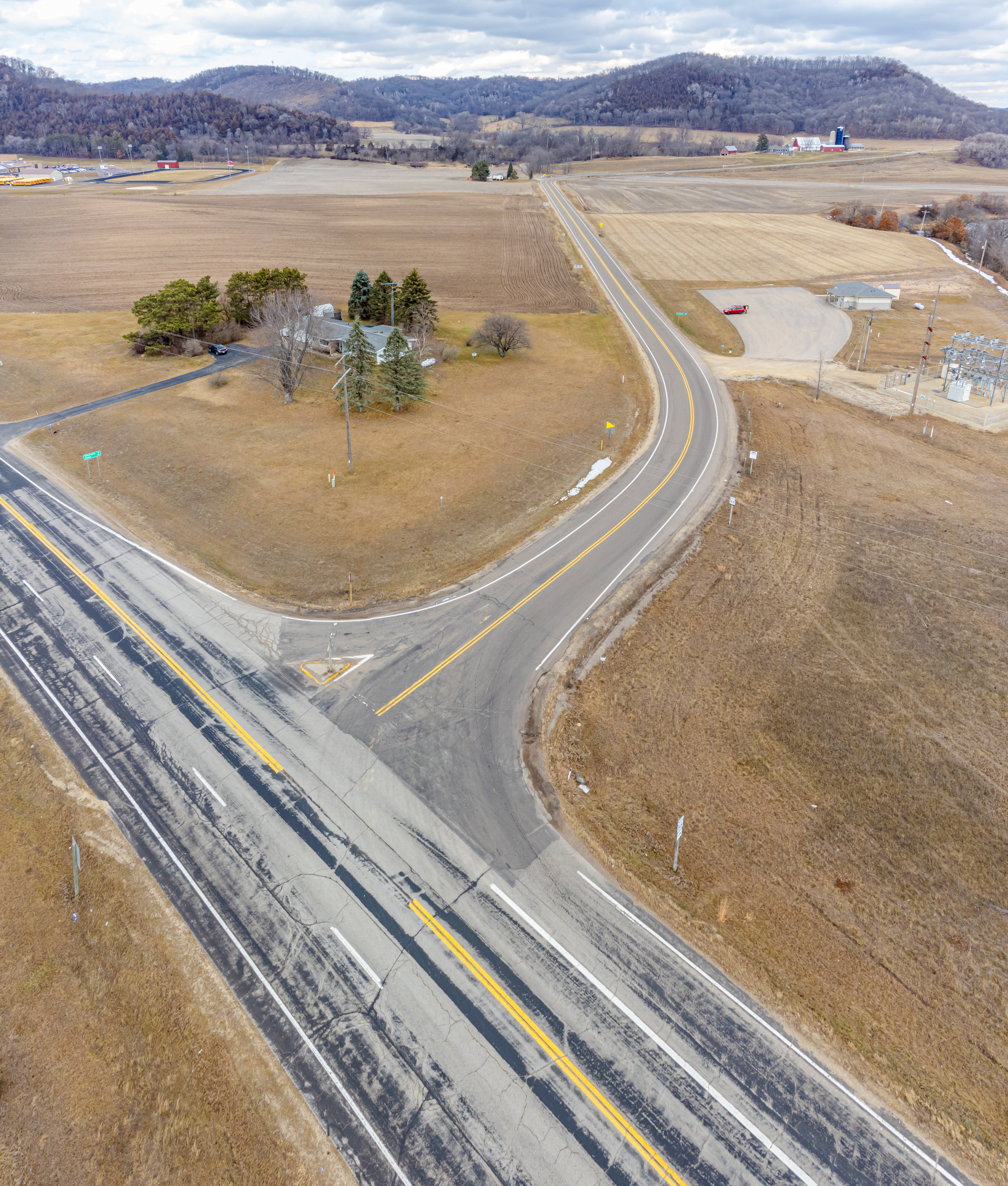
Wis-88 and Wis-35 junction with the Milton town hall to the right and Cochrane-Fountain City School District building to the left

Milton is located in southern Buffalo County along the Mississippi River, which forms the town's southwestern border and is the state border with Minnesota. The town is bordered by Belvidere, Buffalo City, and Waumandee to the north, Cross to the west, and Fountain City, to the south.

According to the United States Census Bureau, Milton has a total area of 29.5 square miles (76.5 km^{2}), of which 21.7 square miles (56.2 km^{2}) is land and 7.8 square miles (20.3 km^{2}), or 26.51%, is water.

== Demographics ==
As of the census of 2000, there were 517 people, 206 households, and 167 families residing in the town. The population density was 20.6 people per square mile (8.0/km^{2}). There were 227 housing units at an average density of 9.1 per square mile (3.5/km^{2}). The racial makeup of the town was 99.42% White, 0.19% Asian, 0.19% Pacific Islander, and 0.19% from two or more races. Hispanic or Latino of any race were 0.97% of the population.

There were 206 households, out of which 33.0% had children under the age of 18 living with them, 74.3% were married couples living together, 3.9% had a female householder with no husband present, and 18.9% were non-families. 16.0% of all households were made up of individuals, and 6.8% had someone living alone who was 65 years of age or older. The average household size was 2.51 and the average family size was 2.79.

In the town, the population was spread out, with 22.8% under the age of 18, 5.6% from 18 to 24, 26.3% from 25 to 44, 30.4% from 45 to 64, and 14.9% who were 65 years of age or older. The median age was 42 years. For every 100 females, there were 102.7 males. For every 100 females age 18 and over, there were 111.1 males.

The median income for a household in the town was $46,838, and the median income for a family was $47,500. Males had a median income of $28,500 versus $21,875 for females. The per capita income for the town was $22,431. About 5.2% of families and 5.6% of the population were below the poverty line, including 6.6% of those under age 18 and 10.1% of those age 65 or over.
