= Cochrane-Fountain City School District =

Cochrane-Fountain City School
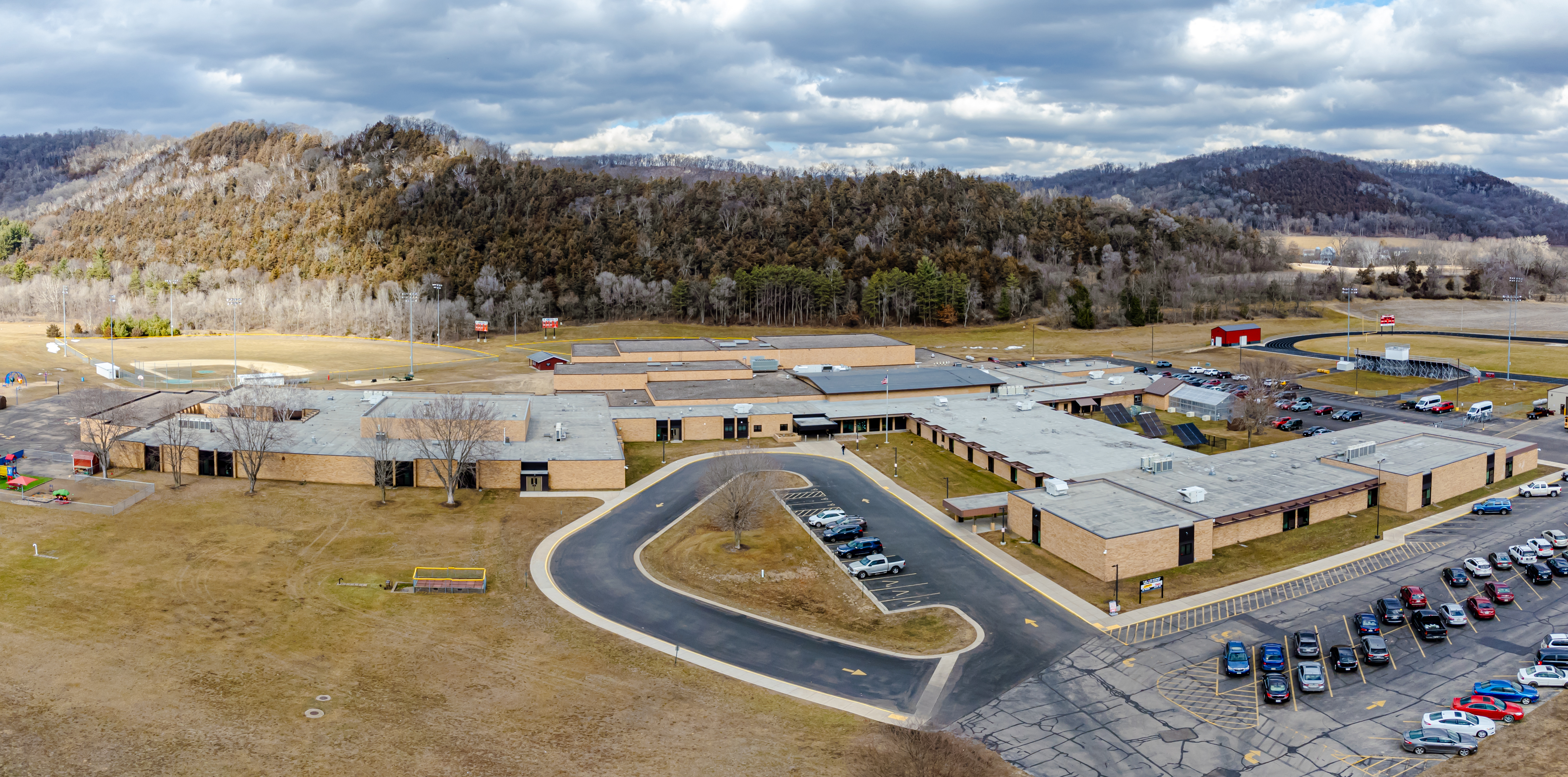
- Milton, Buffalo County, Wisconsin; United States

Information
- Type: K-12
- Principal: Steve Stoppelmoor
- Enrollment: 175
- Colors: Black, white, and red
- Mascot: Pirates
- Website: Cochrane-Fountain City School District

Cochrane-Fountain City School District is a school district headquartered in Milton, Buffalo County, Wisconsin, United States. The school district serves students in grades K-12 from surrounding areas. Most students reside in Buffalo City, Cochrane, and Fountain City.

== Athletics ==
The school's athletic teams compete in the Dairyland Conference.

C-FC has a total of 11 state championships in its history, 9 of which are in Cross Country and 1 in Boys Basketball and one in Girls Track and Field.

Among Dairyland Conference schools, Cochrane–Fountain City ranks second in total state championships, behind Osseo-Fairchild's 14 titles.

=== Cross Country ===
The C-FC Pirates' cross-country team won the Wisconsin Division 3 boys' state championship for the first time in 1984, and then for four consecutive years from 1993 to 1996, and girls' state championship in 1996, 1998, and 1999.

In fall of 2022, Cochrane-Fountain City became the first school in Division 3 to have a state champion in both the boys and girls division. 2023 graduate, Wesley Pronschinske, won the boys' Division 3 boys individual crown with a time of 16:08.9. 2026 graduate, Addy Duellman, won the individual girls' Division 3 title with a time of 18:58.1.

The 2023 season also marked the schools' 4th gold medal for the Division 3 Girls' since 1999. They won the gold medal in Division 3 with a team score of 132 points.

=== Girls Track and Field ===
At the WIAA Division 3 State Track & Field meet held at the University of Wisconsin–La Crosse’s Veterans Memorial Field on June 6–7, 2025, the Cochrane–Fountain City Pirates girls' team claimed their first-ever state championship title.

The Pirates amassed a total of 40 team points, edging out runner‑up Lourdes Academy (Oshkosh, Wisconsin) by a single point to clinch the Division 3 team crown.

=== Girls Volleyball ===
From the 2008 season to the 2017 season, the Pirates won ten consecutive girls' volleyball conference championships, with the seasons of 2011, 2012, 2013, 2014, 2015, 2016 and 2017 all being undefeated in the Dairyland.

In those 10 seasons, the girls' volleyball team went an impressive 82-2 in conference play.

=== Girls Softball ===
In June 2014, the girls’ softball team made their first Division 4 state appearance in school history. They brought home the silver ball, after taking second place to softball powerhouse, Oakfield, Wisconsin.

They made a second state appearance in the 2016 season, losing in the state semifinal game to Southwestern.

=== Boys Basketball ===
In March 2014, the C-FC Pirates made their first ever appearance for state Division 5 Boys basketball tournament at the Kohl Center, in Madison, Wisconsin. They lost in the D5 semifinal game 52-54 to would be state champions that season, Thorp.

In March 2025, 11 years after their first state appearance, the Boys Basketball team made their second appearance at the Kohl Center in Division 5. Seeded #1 overall entering the tournament, they faced #4 Turtle Lake. The Pirates beat the Lakers 66-54, making history winning their first ever game at state for the sport.

They then faced two-time state champion, Sheboygan Lutheran High School for the Division 5 championship. C-FC came out ahead, winning 60-54 and taking home their first gold ball in school history. They ended the 2024-2025 season with the program's best record ever, at 28-2.

=== Athletic conference affiliation history ===
- Bi-County League (1958-1959)
- Mississippi Valley Conference (1959-1963)
- Dairyland Conference (1963-1971)
- Coulee Conference (1971-1977)
- Dairyland Conference (1977–present)
