= Wisconsin Highway 88 =

Highway in Wisconsin

State Trunk Highway 88
- WIS 88 highlighted in red

Route information
- Maintained by WisDOT
- Length: 29.75 mi (47.88 km)

Major junctions
- South end: WIS 35 in Czechville
- WIS 121 in Gilanton
- North end: WIS 37 south of Mondovi

Location
- Country: United States
- State: Wisconsin
- Counties: Buffalo

Highway system
- Wisconsin State Trunk Highway System; Interstate; US; State; Scenic; Rustic
← WIS 87	→ WIS 89

State Trunk Highway 88 (often called Highway 88, STH-88 or WIS 88) is a 29.71-mile (47.81 km) state highway in Buffalo County, Wisconsin, that runs from WIS 35 north of Fountain City to WIS 37 south of Mondovi.

== Route description ==
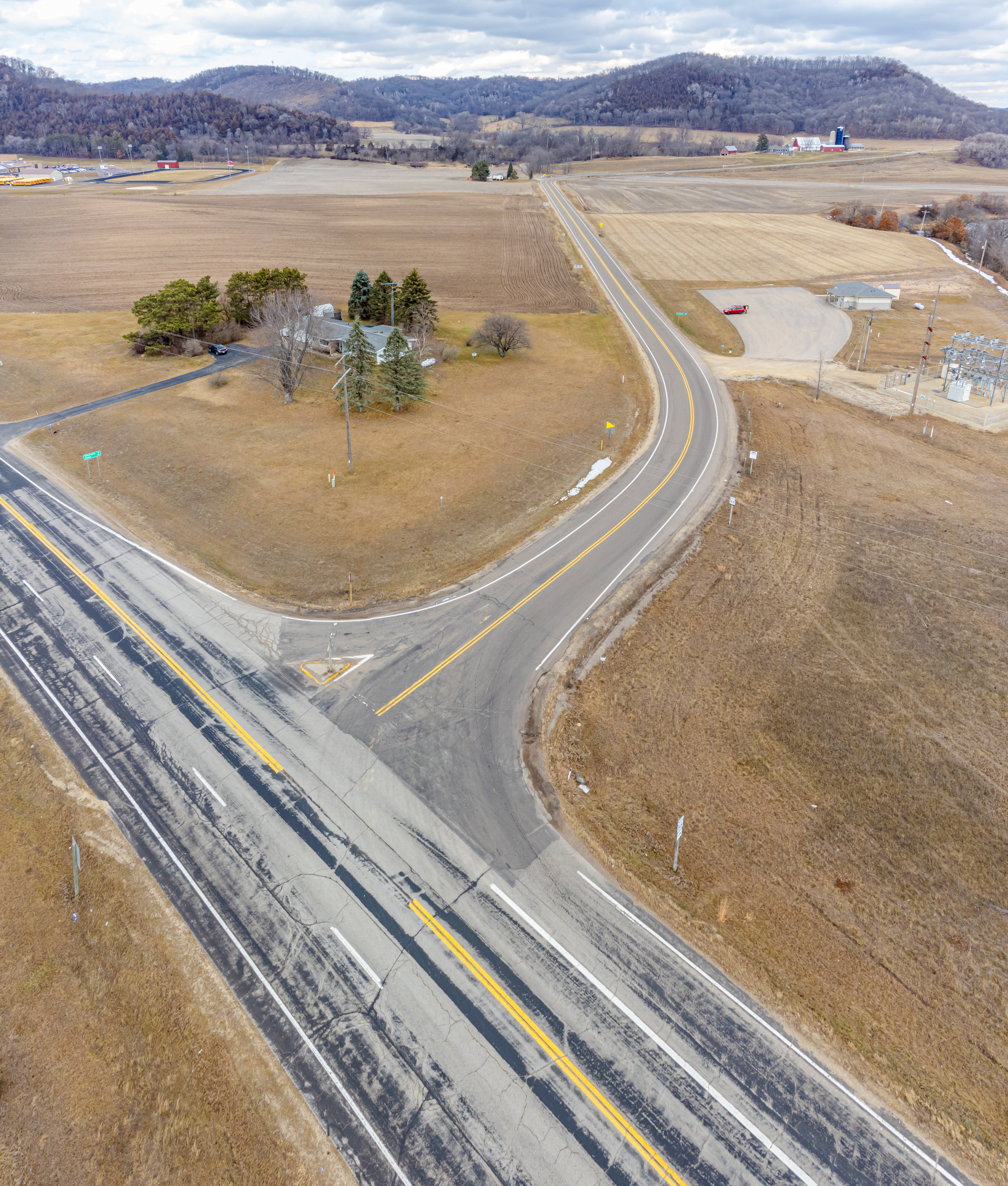
WIS 88 and WIS 35 junction and southern terminus

WIS 88 begins at a T intersection with WIS 35 in the unincorporated community of Czechville, northwest of Fountain City and southeast of Cochrane. It heads north on a curving route and passes through the communities of Cream and Praag. The highway then turns northwest before curving back north into Gilmanton. WIS 88 enters Gilmanton from the west and meets the western terminus of Wisconsin Highway 121 before turning north. It meets the eastern terminus of Rustic Road 1 and heads north out of Gilmanton. The highway crosses the Buffalo River before terminating at WIS 37 south of Mondovi.

== Major intersections ==
The entire route is in Buffalo County.

Location	mi	km	Destinations	Notes
Czechville	0.00	0.00	WIS 35 / Great River Road – Cochrane, Alma, Fountain City, Centerville	Southern terminus
Town of Waumandee	4.24	6.82	CTH-O west – Cochrane	
Town of Lincoln	10.88	17.51	CTH-XX north – CTH-U	Yapp Road continues briefly west from the intersection
Town of Lincoln	13.92	22.40	CTH-T west	
Town of Lincoln	19.35	31.14	CTH-U south – Waumandee	
Community of Gilmanton	25.09	40.38	WIS 121 east – Independence	
Community of Gilmanton	25.44	40.94	CTH-Z east – CTH-V	
Town of Mondovi	29.41	47.33	CTH-ZZ north – CTH-H	
Town of Mondovi	29.75	47.88	WIS 37 north – Mondovi WIS 37 south – Alma	Northern terminus
1.000 mi = 1.609 km; 1.000 km = 0.621 mi
