= David I. Hammergren =

American politician

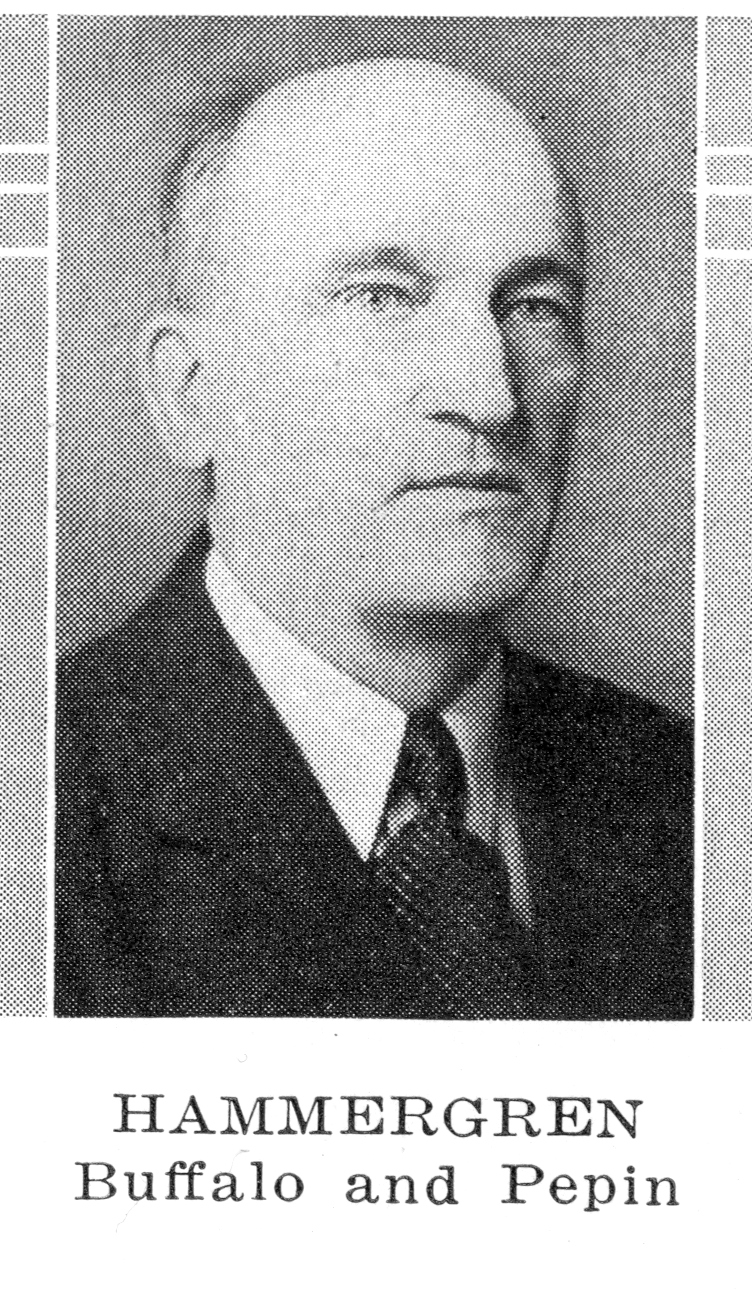
David I. Hammergren

David Immanuel Hammergren (June 16, 1875 – August 13, 1944) was a member of the Minnesota House of Representatives and the Wisconsin State Assembly.

== Biography ==
Hammergren was born in Saint Paul, Minnesota. Later, he moved to Cochrane, Wisconsin. He died in Cochrane after a heart attack.

== Career ==
Hammergren was a member of the Minnesota House of Representatives from 1905 to 1907 and of the Wisconsin State Assembly from 1939 to 1944. Hammergren served on the Buffalo County, Wisconsin Board of Supervisors. He was also a delegate to the 1944 Republican National Convention.
