= Strum, Wisconsin =

- Village
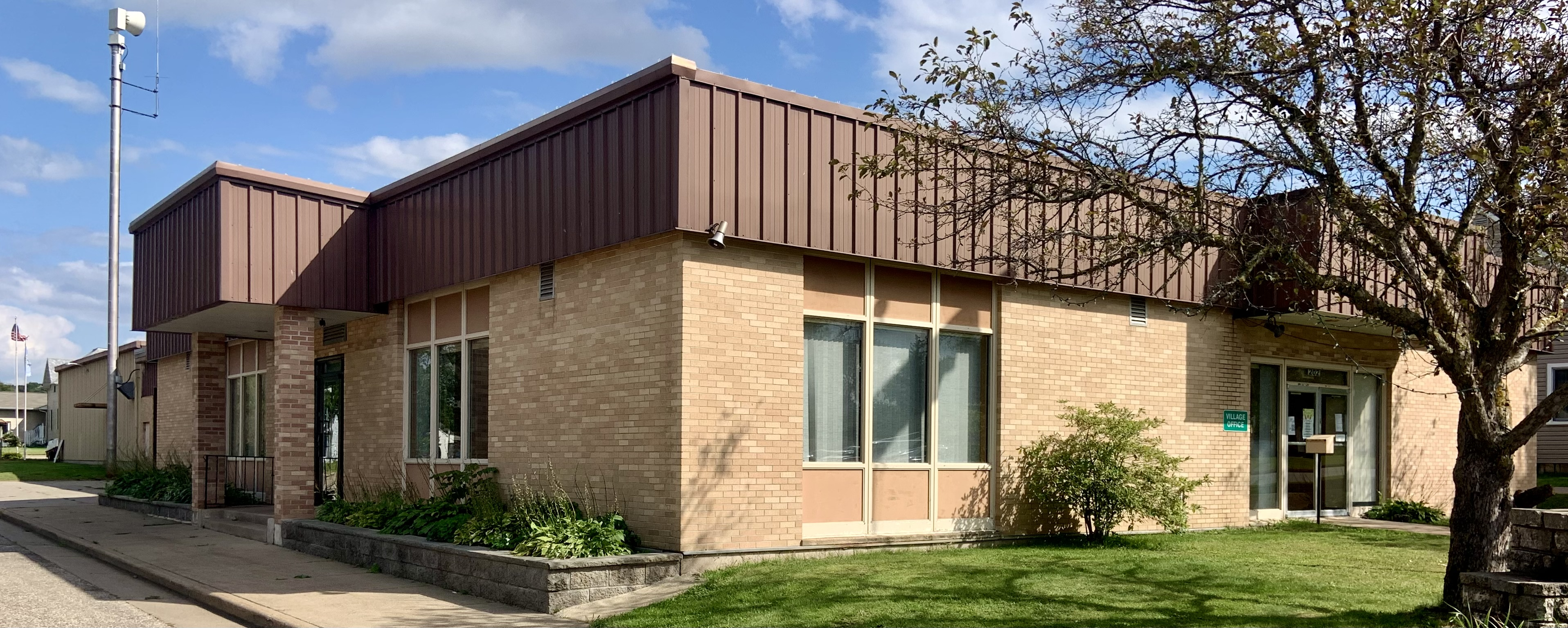
- Village hall

- Location of Strum in Trempealeau County, Wisconsin
- Coordinates: 44°33′1″N 91°23′31″W
- Country: United States
- State: Wisconsin
- County: Trempealeau

Government
  - Village President: Dean Boehne

Area
  - Total: 1.33 sq mi (3.44 km^{2})
  - Land: 1.23 sq mi (3.18 km^{2})
  - Water: 0.10 sq mi (0.26 km^{2})
- Elevation: 909 ft (277 m)

Population (2020)
  - Total: 1,076
  - Density: 876/sq mi (338/km^{2})
- Time zone: UTC-6 (Central (CST))
  - Summer (DST): UTC-5 (CDT)
- Area codes: 715 & 534
- FIPS code: 55-77825
- GNIS feature ID: 1574988
- Website: www.strumwi.com

Strum is a village in Trempealeau County, Wisconsin, United States, along the Buffalo River. The population was 1,076 at the 2020 census.

== History ==
Strum was named by Congressman William T. Price for his friend, Louis Strum of Eau Claire. At first the village was called Tilden after politician Samuel J. Tilden, but on January 1, 1890, the name became officially Strum.

== Geography ==
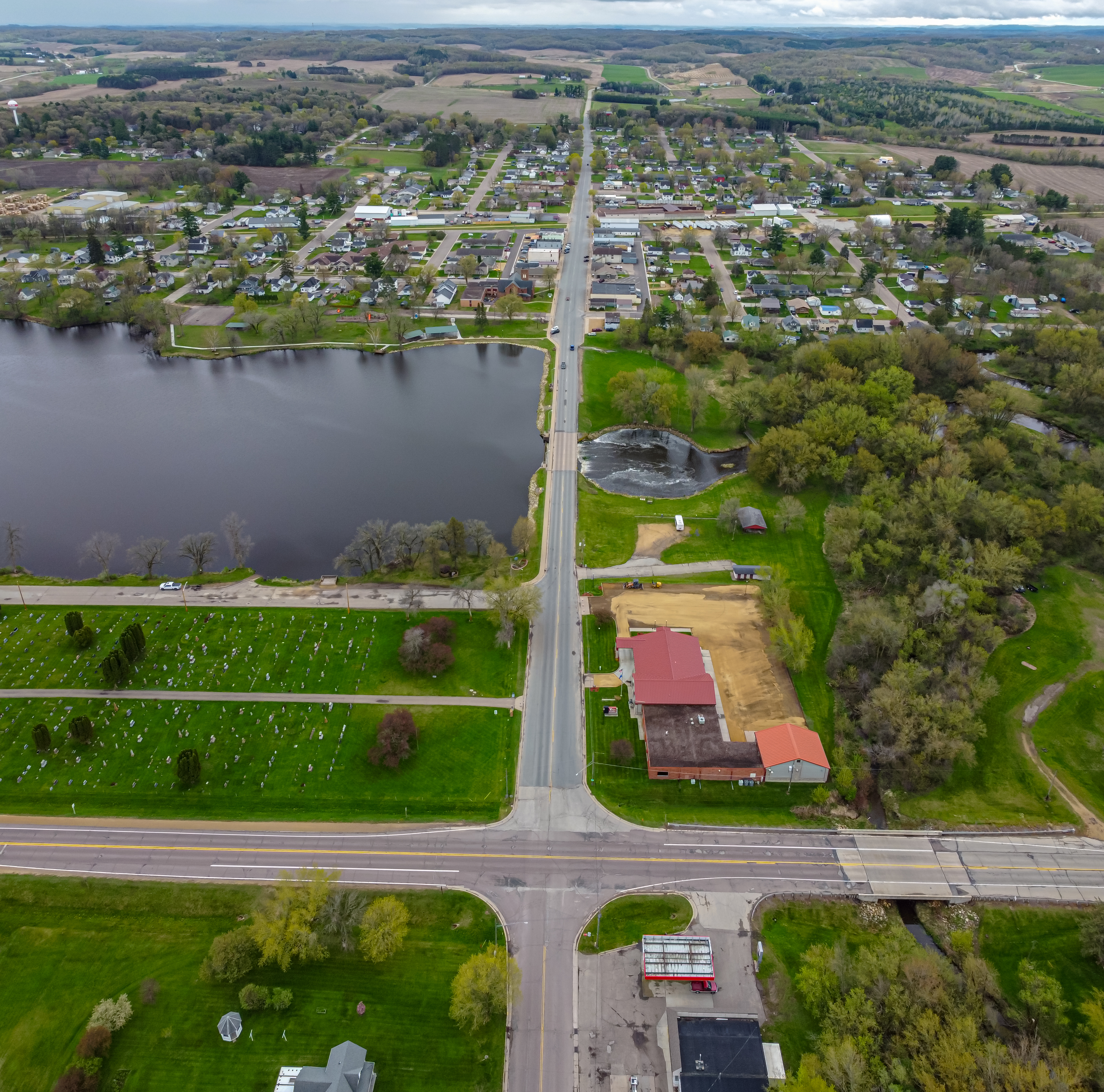
US-10 runs by town.

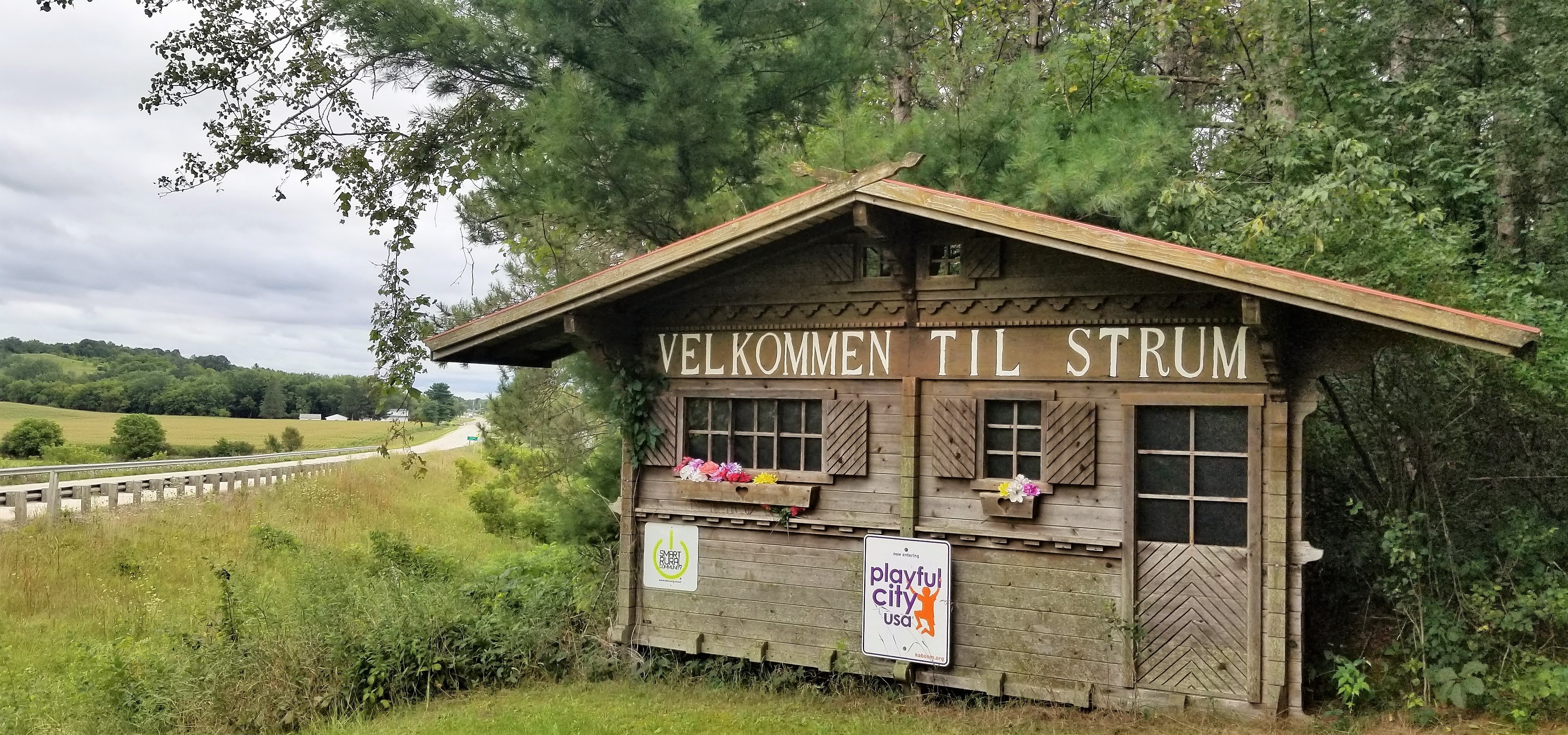
Sign welcoming visitors to Strum

Strum is located at 44°33′1″N 91°23′31″W (44.550388, -91.391904).

According to the United States Census Bureau, the village has a total area of 1.28 square miles (3.32 km^{2}), of which 1.18 square miles (3.06 km^{2}) is land and 0.10 square miles (0.26 km^{2}) is water.

Strum is home to Crystal Lake. A reservoir on the Buffalo River, it is home to trout, panfish, largemouth bass, and northern pike.

The Buffalo River flows from west of Osseo to the Mississippi River, and is a trout stream from Strum east.

== Demographics ==
Historical population
Census	Pop.	Note	%±
1950	542		—
1960	663		22.3%
1970	738		11.3%
1980	944		27.9%
1990	949		0.5%
2000	1,001		5.5%
2010	1,114		11.3%
2020	1,076		−3.4%
U.S. Decennial Census

=== 2010 census ===
As of the census of 2010, there were 1,114 people, 440 households, and 293 families living in the village. The population density was 944.1 inhabitants per square mile (364.5/km^{2}). There were 467 housing units at an average density of 395.8 per square mile (152.8/km^{2}). The racial makeup of the village was 96.1% White, 0.2% African American, 0.1% Native American, 0.2% Asian, 2.9% from other races, and 0.5% from two or more races. Hispanic or Latino people of any race were 6.6% of the population.

There were 440 households, of which 34.1% had children under the age of 18 living with them, 48.9% were married couples living together, 10.7% had a female householder with no husband present, 7.0% had a male householder with no wife present, and 33.4% were non-families. 28.9% of all households were made up of individuals, and 15.9% had someone living alone who was 65 years of age or older. The average household size was 2.42 and the average family size was 2.95.

The median age in the village was 38.6 years. 26.8% of residents were under the age of 18; 5.8% were between the ages of 18 and 24; 24.3% were from 25 to 44; 24.6% were from 45 to 64; and 18.5% were 65 years of age or older. The gender makeup of the village was 51.0% male and 49.0% female.

=== 2000 census ===
As of the census of 2000, there were 1,001 people, 411 households, and 249 families living in the village. The population density was 920.7 people per square mile (355.5 people/km^{2}). There were 434 housing units at an average density of 399.2 per square mile (154.1/km^{2}). The racial makeup of the village was 98.90% White, 0.60% from other races, and 0.50% from two or more races. Hispanic or Latino people of any race were 1.40% of the population.

There were 411 households, out of which 30.7% had children under the age of 18 living with them, 49.6% were married couples living together, 7.8% had a female householder with no husband present, and 39.4% were non-families. 35.0% of all households were made up of individuals, and 20.9% had someone living alone who was 65 years of age or older. The average household size was 2.31 and the average family size was 3.00.

In the village, the population was spread out, with 25.4% under the age of 18, 5.7% from 18 to 24, 27.6% from 25 to 44, 17.8% from 45 to 64, and 23.6% who were 65 years of age or older. The median age was 40 years. For every 100 females, there were 99.4 males. For every 100 females age 18 and over, there were 102.4 males.

The median income for a household in the village was $29,408, and the median income for a family was $40,938. Males had a median income of $33,750 versus $20,179 for females. The per capita income for the village was $18,492. About 6.6% of families and 6.3% of the population were below the poverty line, including 2.0% of those under age 18 and 15.8% of those age 65 or over.

== Education ==
Strum is part of the Eleva-Strum Central School District. Formerly Eleva and Strum each housed an elementary school. With the consolidation of the elementary schools at the Central Location, those schools have been closed. The Central School Location is between the two villages on U.S. Hwy. 10.

=== Eleva-Strum High School ===
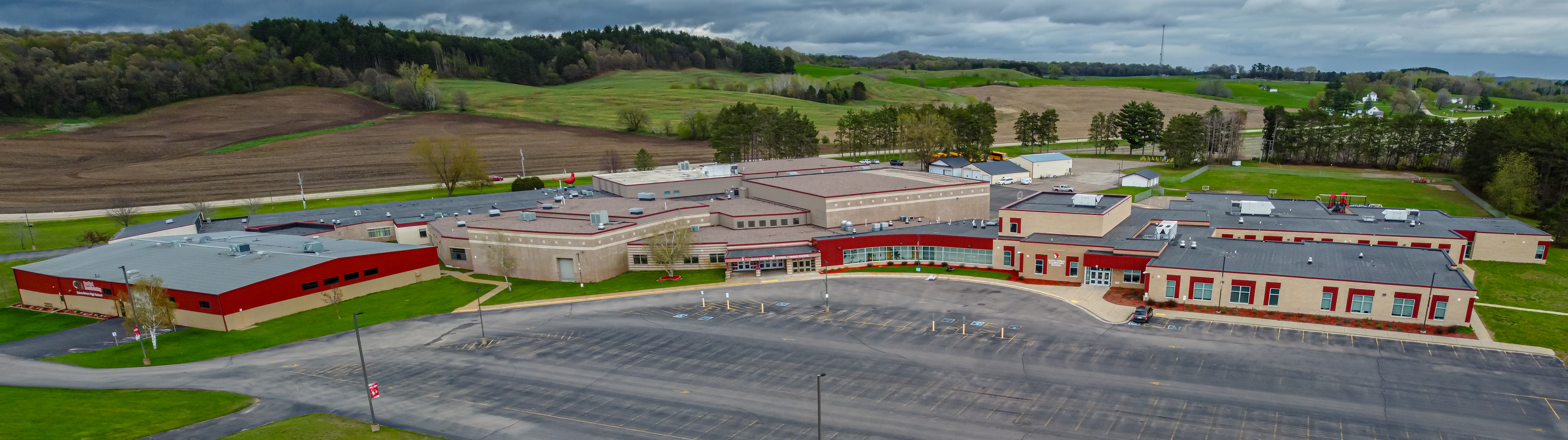
Elva-Strum Central High School

Eleva-Strum High School has a gym, auditorium, and cafeteria. Since 2004, the school's sports teams have made three state tournament appearances in boys' basketball, one in girls' basketball, three in golf, and two in football. They have compiled five conference championships (three in golf and two in basketball) and have brought home two state trophies. The football team, led by Head Coach Warren Behm, won the 2007 Division 7 state championship in an undefeated season by beating Southwestern. The boys' basketball team won the 2008 Division 4 state championship in their undefeated season with a 62–58 win over Suring. The boys' golf team also won the 2008 Division 3 state championship. Eleva-Strum is the only team in the state to win three state titles in one year.

== Recreation ==
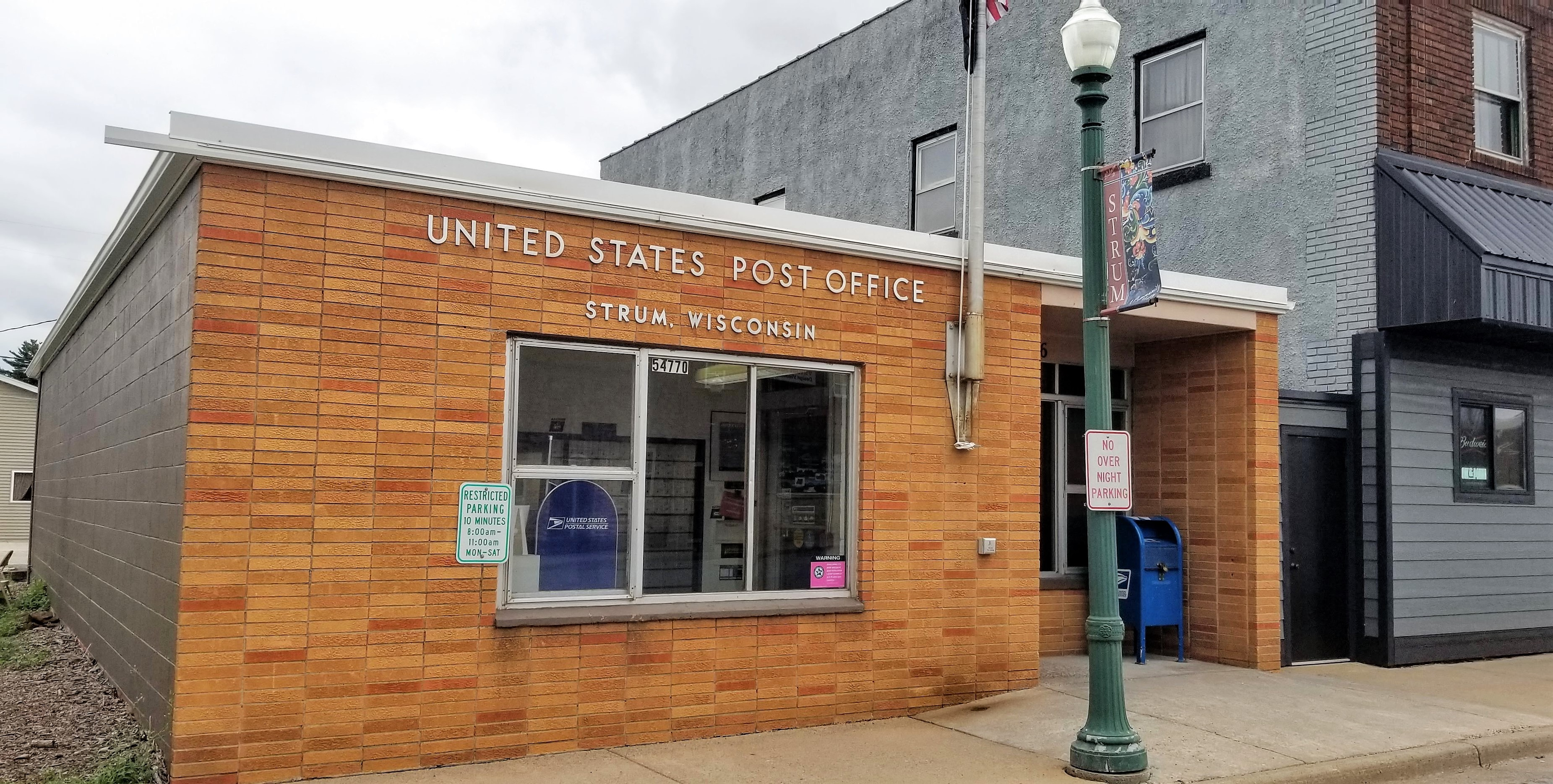
Strum's post office

Strum has four city parks, three of which are located along Crystal Lake. The city is also home to the Viking Recreational Area, which includes a golf course, campground, bar and grill, and a shooting range. The golf course is a 9-hole, par 36 course located along Highway 10 just east of Strum.

The Buffalo River trail runs through the city. An ATV and bicycle trail that runs from Fairchild to Mondovi atop an old railroad bed and can be accessed at any road crossing.

== Sports ==
Strum is home of the Beef River Bullfrogs, an amateur baseball team founded in 1996 that plays in the South division of the Chippewa River Baseball League. The Bullfrogs play at Spangberg Park, named after long-time mayor Ruby Spangberg.
