= Hammargren =

Hammargren is a Swedish surname. Notable people with the surname include:

- Christer Hammargren (born 1944), Swedish motorcycle racer
- Lonnie Hammargren (1937–2023), American politician and neurosurgeon

== See also ==
- Hammergren
