= Canton, Wisconsin =

- Town
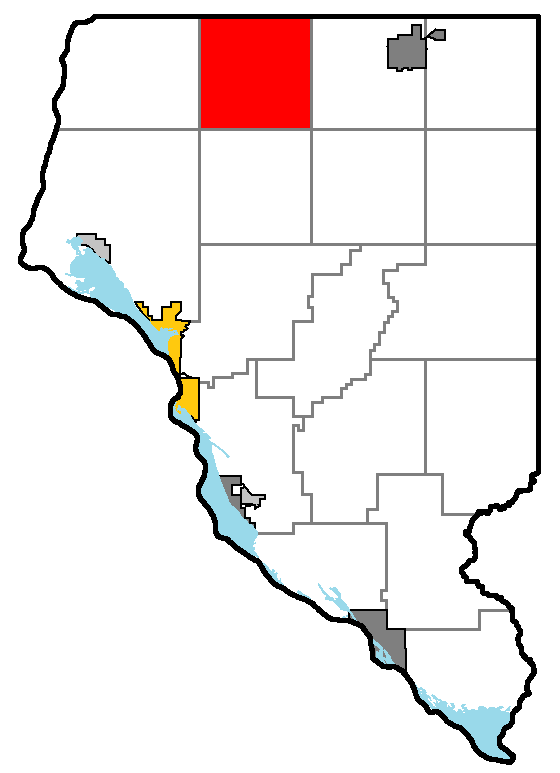
- Location of Canton, Buffalo County

- Location of Buffalo County, Wisconsin
- Coordinates: 44°33′16″N 91°49′18″W
- Country: United States
- State: Wisconsin
- County: Buffalo

Area
  - Total: 35.82 sq mi (92.77 km^{2})
  - Land: 35.80 sq mi (92.73 km^{2})
  - Water: 0.015 sq mi (0.04 km^{2})
- Elevation: 1,080 ft (330 m)

Population (2020)
  - Total: 245
  - Density: 6.84/sq mi (2.64/km^{2})
- Time zone: UTC-6 (Central (CST))
  - Summer (DST): UTC-5 (CDT)
- FIPS code: 55-12500
- GNIS feature ID: 1582915

Canton (/ˈkæntən/ KAN-tən) is a town in Buffalo County in the U.S. state of Wisconsin. The population was 245 at the 2020 census. The ghost town of Springdale was located in the town.

== Geography ==
Canton is located along the northern border of Buffalo County, with Pepin County to the north.

According to the United States Census Bureau, the town has a total area of 35.82 square miles (92.77 km^{2}), of which 35.80 square miles (92.73 km^{2}) is land and 0.015 square miles (0.04 km^{2}), or 0.05%, is water.

== Demographics ==
As of the census of 2000, there were 304 people, 102 households, and 88 families residing in the town. The population density was 8.5 people per square mile (3.3/km^{2}). There were 112 housing units at an average density of 3.1 per square mile (1.2/km^{2}). The racial makeup of the town was 98.36% White, 0.33% African American, 0.33% Asian, and 0.99% from two or more races. Hispanic or Latino of any race were 1.32% of the population.

There were 102 households, out of which 42.2% had children under the age of 18 living with them, 75.5% were married couples living together, 3.9% had a female householder with no husband present, and 13.7% were non-families. 11.8% of all households were made up of individuals, and 3.9% had someone living alone who was 65 years of age or older. The average household size was 2.98 and the average family size was 3.26.

In the town, the population was spread out, with 32.9% under the age of 18, 6.3% from 18 to 24, 30.3% from 25 to 44, 19.4% from 45 to 64, and 11.2% who were 65 years of age or older. The median age was 36 years. For every 100 females, there were 108.2 males. For every 100 females age 18 and over, there were 124.2 males.

The median income for a household in the town was $38,125, and the median income for a family was $41,406. Males had a median income of $25,729 versus $25,833 for females. The per capita income for the town was $14,749. About 9.2% of families and 7.4% of the population were below the poverty line, including 4.0% of those under the age of eighteen and 6.9% of those 65 or over.
