= Buffalo City, Wisconsin =

- City
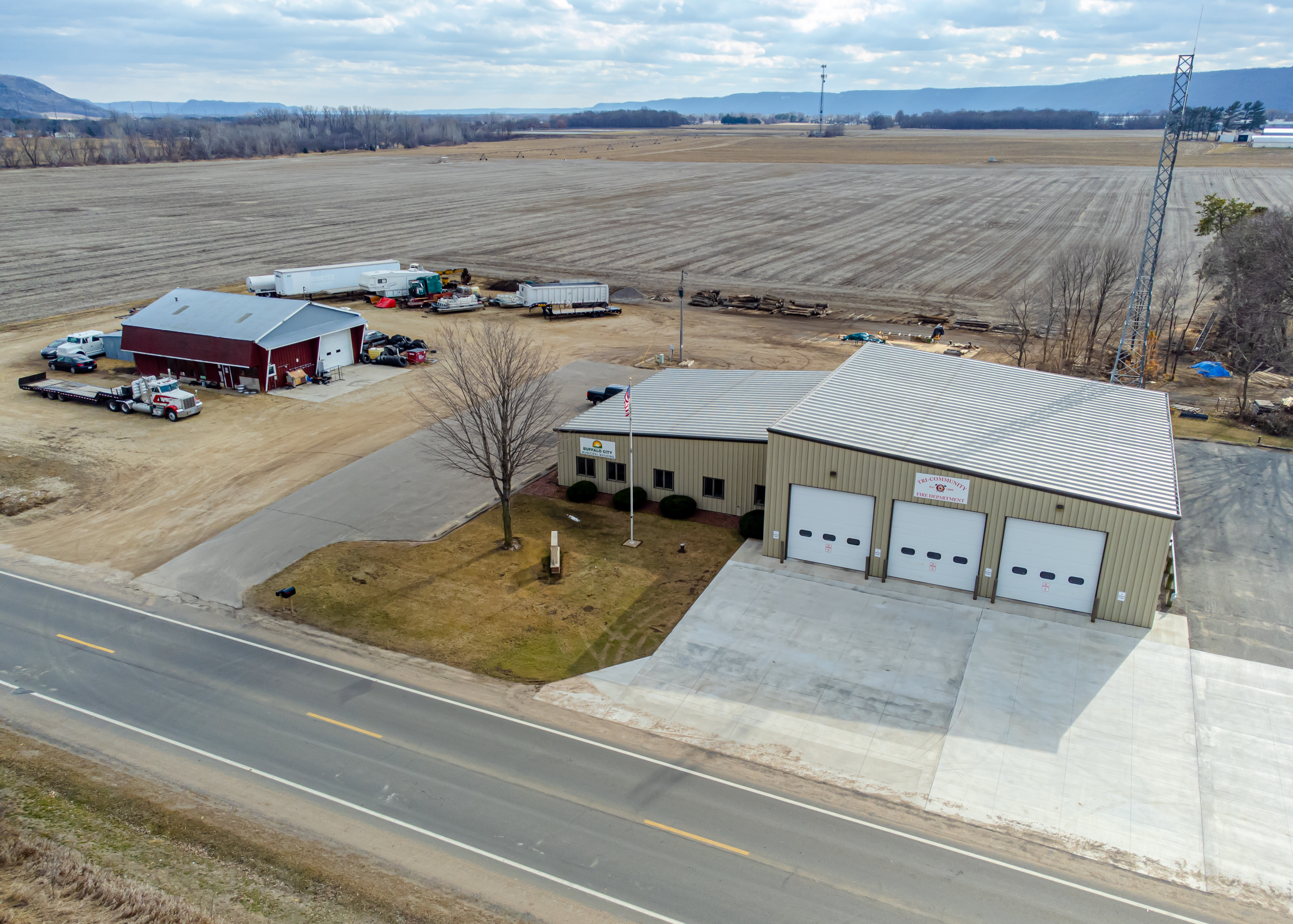
- City Hall building

- Location of Buffalo City in Buffalo County, Wisconsin.

- Location within Wisconsin Location within the United States
- Coordinates: 44°13′59″N 91°51′44″W
- Country: United States
- State: Wisconsin
- County: Buffalo
- Chartered: 1859

Area
  - Total: 4.892 sq mi (12.670 km^{2})
  - Land: 1.894 sq mi (4.905 km^{2})
  - Water: 2.998 sq mi (7.765 km^{2})
- Elevation: 669 ft (204 m)

Population (2020)
  - Total: 1,007
  - Density: 532/sq mi (205.3/km^{2})
- Time zone: UTC-6 (Central (CST))
  - Summer (DST): UTC-5 (CDT)
- FIPS code: 55-11062
- GNIS feature ID: 1562364
- Website: Buffalo City

Buffalo City is a city in Buffalo County, Wisconsin, United States. As of the 2020 census, Buffalo City had a population of 1,007.

== History ==
The name may be derived from a buffalo animal husbandry operation in the past. The city was chartered in 1859. At that time it was the only city in Buffalo County.

The town may have been named for three brothers who raised buffalo on a bluff overlooking the city.

== Geography ==
Buffalo City is located at 44°13′59″N 91°51′44″W (44.233180, -91.862219).

According to the United States Census Bureau, the city has a total area of 6.04 square miles (15.64 km^{2}), of which 2.11 square miles (5.46 km^{2}) is land and 3.93 square miles (10.18 km^{2}) is water.

It is located west of Cochrane on the shore of Spring Lake, a backwater of the Mississippi River.

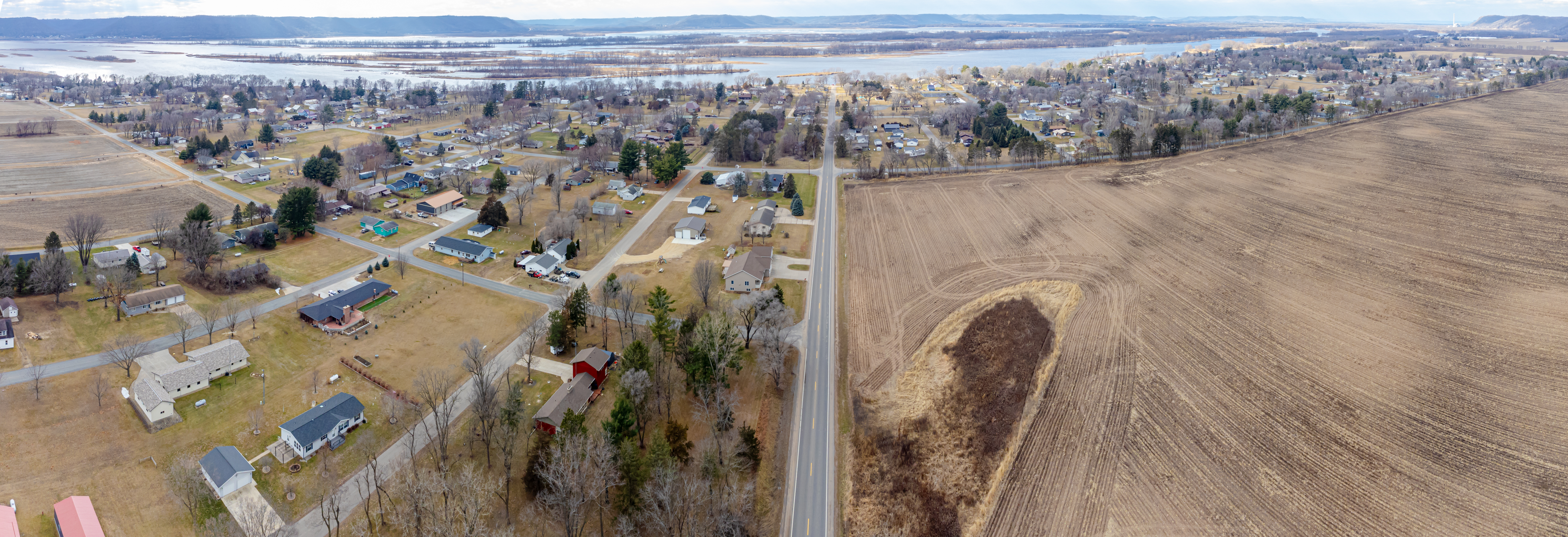

== Demographics ==
Historical population
| Census | Pop. | Note | %± |
|---|---|---|---|
| 1860 | 184 | | — |
| 1870 | 268 | | 45.7% |
| 1880 | 248 | | −7.5% |
| 1890 | 223 | | −10.1% |
| 1900 | 254 | | 13.9% |
| 1910 | 255 | | 0.4% |
| 1920 | 286 | | 12.2% |
| 1930 | 261 | | −8.7% |
| 1940 | 293 | | 12.3% |
| 1950 | 319 | | 8.9% |
| 1960 | 484 | | 51.7% |
| 1970 | 671 | | 38.6% |
| 1980 | 894 | | 33.2% |
| 1990 | 915 | | 2.3% |
| 2000 | 1,040 | | 13.7% |
| 2010 | 1,023 | | −1.6% |
| 2020 | 1,007 | | −1.6% |

=== 2010 census ===
As of the census of 2010, there were 1,023 people, 464 households, and 312 families living in the city. The population density was 484.8 inhabitants per square mile (187.2/km^{2}). There were 577 housing units at an average density of 273.5 per square mile (105.6/km^{2}). The racial makeup of the city was 98.4% White, 0.1% African American, 0.2% Native American, 0.3% Asian, and 1.0% from two or more races. Hispanic or Latino of any race were 0.4% of the population.

There were 464 households, of which 22.4% had children under the age of 18 living with them, 57.8% were married couples living together, 6.0% had a female householder with no husband present, 3.4% had a male householder with no wife present, and 32.8% were non-families. 25.4% of all households were made up of individuals, and 12.1% had someone living alone who was 65 years of age or older. The average household size was 2.20 and the average family size was 2.60.

The median age in the city was 49.3 years. 17.3% of residents were under the age of 18; 5.9% were between the ages of 18 and 24; 21.7% were from 25 to 44; 32.5% were from 45 to 64; and 22.7% were 65 years of age or older. The gender makeup of the city was 49.8% male and 50.2% female.

=== 2000 census ===
As of the census of 2000, there were 1,040 people, 445 households, and 320 families living in the city. The population density was 486.2 people per square mile (187.6/km^{2}). There were 492 housing units at an average density of 230.0 per square mile (88.8/km^{2}). The racial makeup of the city was 98.56% White, 0.19% African American, 0.48% Asian, 0.10% Pacific Islander, and 0.67% from two or more races. Hispanic or Latino of any race were 0.58% of the population.

There were 445 households, out of which 29.0% had children under the age of 18 living with them, 63.1% were married couples living together, 6.1% had a female householder with no husband present, and 27.9% were non-families. 24.7% of all households were made up of individuals, and 11.9% had someone living alone who was 65 years of age or older. The average household size was 2.34 and the average family size was 2.77.

In the city, the population was spread out, with 22.5% under the age of 18, 5.7% from 18 to 24, 26.9% from 25 to 44, 27.2% from 45 to 64, and 17.7% who were 65 years of age or older. The median age was 43 years. For every 100 females, there were 101.6 males. For every 100 females age 18 and over, there were 96.1 males.

The median income for a household in the city was $39,318, and the median income for a family was $48,906. Males had a median income of $30,250 versus $20,625 for females. The per capita income for the city was $18,392. About 1.9% of families and 3.8% of the population were below the poverty line, including 5.7% of those under age 18 and 4.8% of those age 65 or over.

== Education ==
Buffalo City is part of the Cochrane-Fountain City School District.

== Landmarks ==
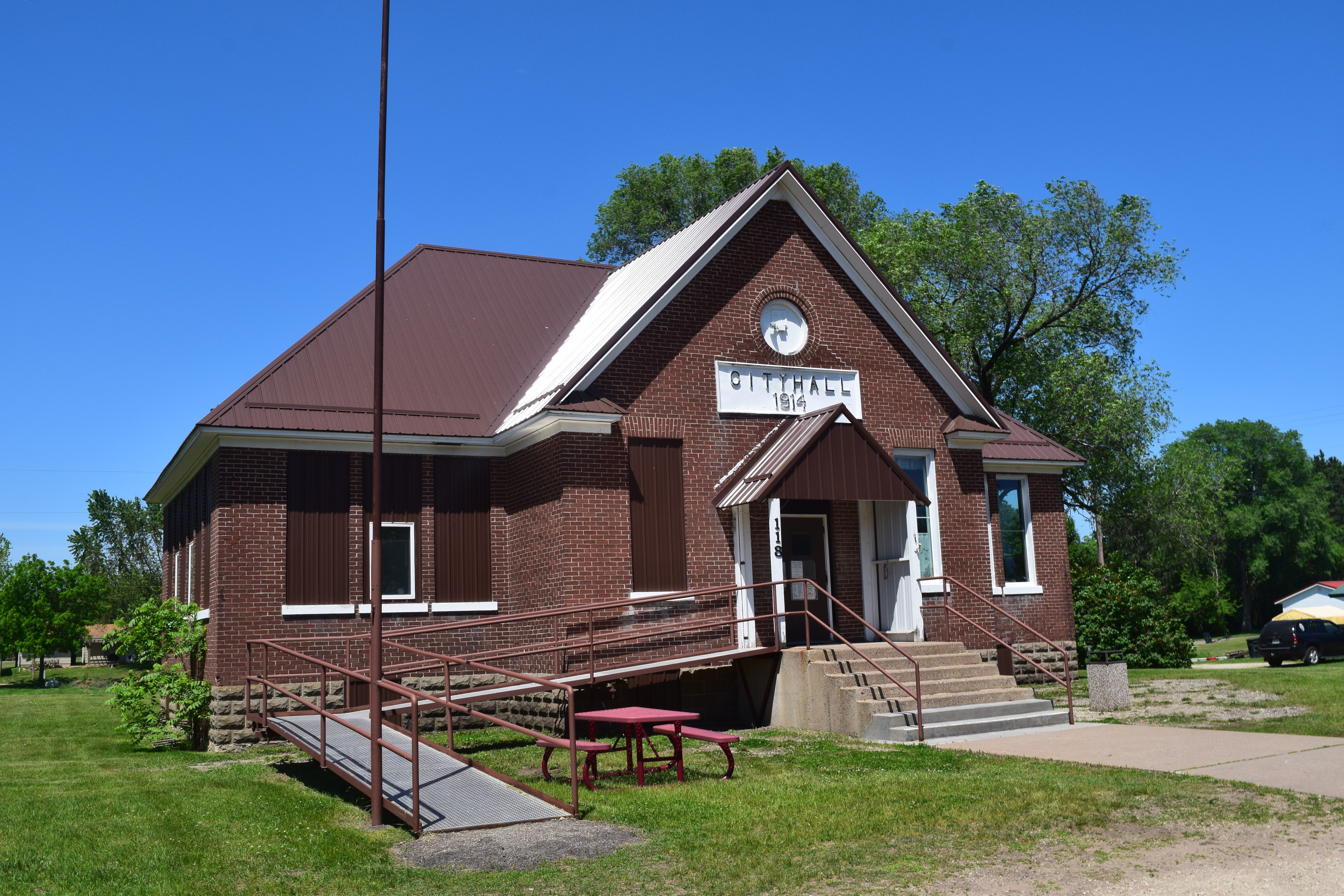
Old 1914 City Hall building

Buffalo City is home to the original Buffalo County Jail, which was built in 1862 and is now part of the city's park between 10th and 12th streets. Another unusual feature of the city is a large Viking statue, located at the corner of River Road and W 17th Street.
