= Buffalo County, Wisconsin =

County in Wisconsin, United States

- County
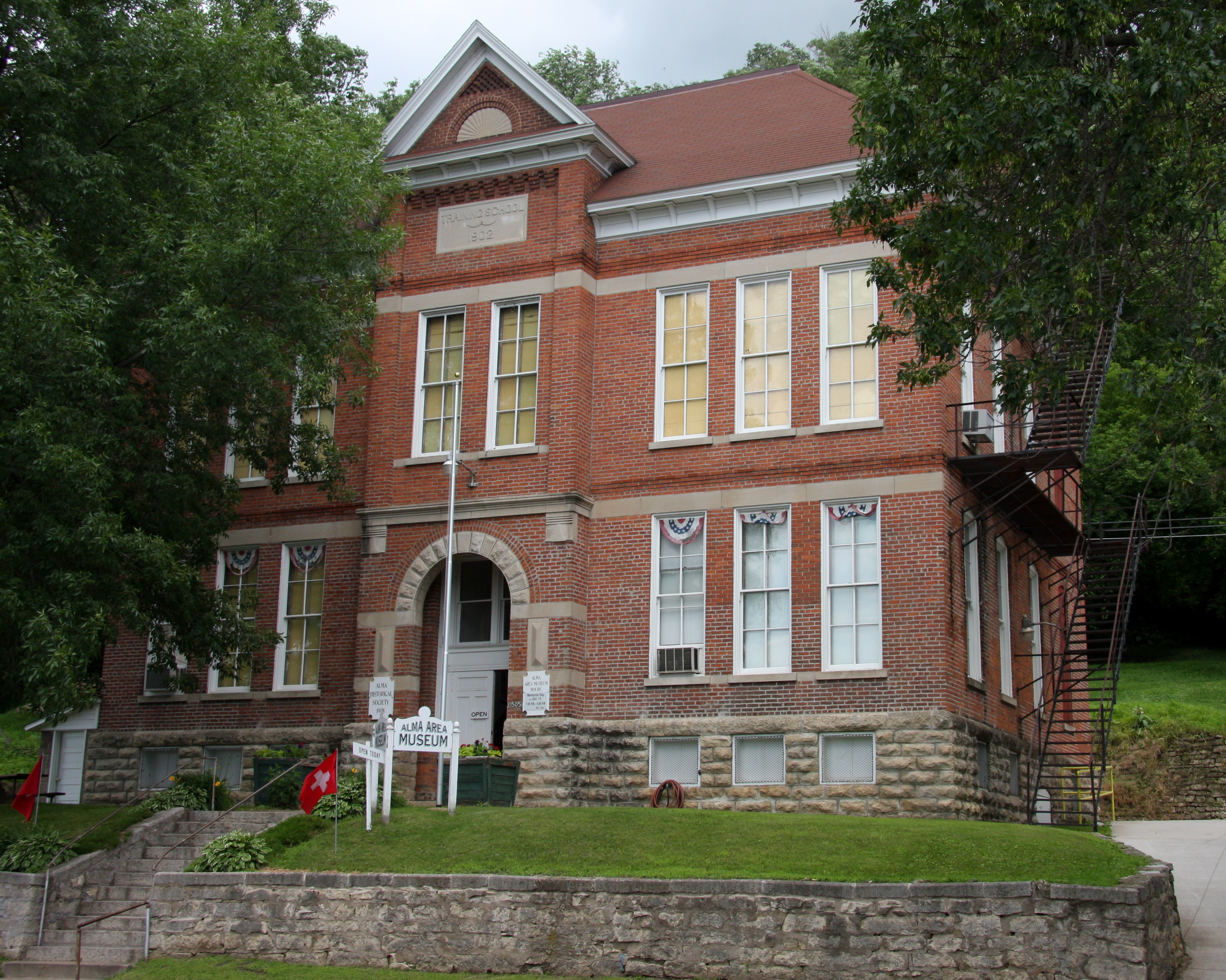
- Alma Area Museum in Old Buffalo County Training School and Teachers College Building in Alma, Wisconsin.

- Location within the U.S. state of Wisconsin
- Coordinates: 44°23′N 91°45′W
- Country: United States
- State: Wisconsin
- Founded: 1854
- Named for: Buffalo River
- Seat: Alma
- Largest city: Mondovi

Area
  - Total: 710 sq mi (1,800 km^{2})
  - Land: 672 sq mi (1,740 km^{2})
  - Water: 38 sq mi (98 km^{2}) 5.3%

Population (2020)
  - Total: 13,317
  - Estimate (2025): 13,318 ▲
  - Density: 19.8/sq mi (7.65/km^{2})
- Time zone: UTC−6 (Central)
  - Summer (DST): UTC−5 (CDT)
- Congressional district: 3rd
- Website: www.buffalocountywi.gov

Buffalo County is a county located in the U.S. state of Wisconsin. As of the 2020 census, the population was 13,317. Its county seat is Alma. The county was created in 1853 and organized the following year. The county is considered a high-farming concentration county by the U.S. Department of Agriculture, meaning at least 20 percent of its earnings came from agriculture.

== History ==
Buffalo County, founded in 1853, is named for the Buffalo River, which flows from Strum to Alma, where it empties into the Mississippi River. The Buffalo River obtained its name from the French voyager Father Louis Hennepin, who named it Riviere des Boeufs in 1680. The first permanent settlement was established in 1839, located in what is now Fountain City. This settlement was originally named Holmes' Landing after a family who traded with the Sioux and Chippewa. Buffalo County was settled primarily by Swiss, German, and Norwegian immigrants who were drawn to the area by the growing lumber industry, fertile soils, access to the Mississippi, and available land. By 1848, a second community was established called Twelve Mile Bluff, which is now known as Alma.

Soils of Buffalo County

Agriculture developed during the 1850s on top of the ridges where natural prairies and oak savannas occurred, which made working the land much easier. With the lack of good roads, settlement remained along the Mississippi River, where farmers could ship their grain on steamboats. The development of the Northern Rail from Winona, Minnesota, allowed for development away from the river, and by 1890, farmers were transporting their goods predominantly by rail.

The Civil War gave a boost to the local economy with the rising demand for wheat, which was the main crop of the county. The postwar period brought a large influx of settlers; however, because of declining soil fertility, many moved west rather than adopt crop rotation and fertilization. With the price of wheat falling, farmers turned to dairy farming, and by the 1880s, local creameries had started to appear.

== Geography ==
According to the U.S. Census Bureau, the county has a total area of 710 square miles (1,800 km^{2}), of which 672 square miles (1,740 km^{2}) are land and 38 square miles (98 km^{2}) (5.3%) are covered by water.

=== Adjacent counties ===
- Pepin County – north
- Eau Claire County – northeast
- Trempealeau County – east
- Winona County, Minnesota – south
- Wabasha County, Minnesota – west

=== Major highways ===
- U.S. Highway 10
- Highway 25 (Wisconsin)
- Highway 35 (Wisconsin)
- Highway 37 (Wisconsin)
- Highway 54 (Wisconsin)
- Highway 88 (Wisconsin)
- Highway 95 (Wisconsin)
- Highway 121 (Wisconsin)

=== Railroads ===
- BNSF
- CN subsidiary, Wisconsin Central

== Demographics ==
Historical population
Census	Pop.	Note	%±
1860	3,864		—
1870	11,123		187.9%
1880	15,528		39.6%
1890	15,997		3.0%
1900	16,765		4.8%
1910	16,006		−4.5%
1920	15,615		−2.4%
1930	15,330		−1.8%
1940	16,090		5.0%
1950	14,719		−8.5%
1960	14,202		−3.5%
1970	13,743		−3.2%
1980	14,309		4.1%
1990	13,584		−5.1%
2000	13,804		1.6%
2010	13,587		−1.6%
2020	13,317		−2.0%
2025 (est.)	13,318	▲	0.0%
U.S. Decennial Census; 1790–1960 1900–1990; 1990–2000 2010 2020

=== Racial and ethnic composition ===
Buffalo County, Wisconsin – Racial and ethnic composition Note: the US Census treats Hispanic/Latino as an ethnic category. This table excludes Latinos from the racial categories and assigns them to a separate category. Hispanics/Latinos may be of any race.
Race / ethnicity (NH = Non-Hispanic)	Pop 1980	Pop 1990	Pop 2000	Pop 2010	Pop 2020	% 1980	% 1990	% 2000	% 2010	% 2020
White alone (NH)	14,236	13,487	13,555	13,135	12,577	99.49%	99.29%	98.20%	96.67%	94.44%
Black or African American alone (NH)	2	5	15	35	43	0.01%	0.04%	0.11%	0.26%	0.32%
Native American or Alaska Native alone (NH)	18	21	41	37	31	0.13%	0.15%	0.30%	0.27%	0.23%
Asian alone (NH)	19	29	44	27	19	0.13%	0.21%	0.32%	0.20%	0.14%
Native Hawaiian or Pacific Islander alone (NH)	x	x	2	0	12	x	x	0.01%	0.00%	0.09%
Other race alone (NH)	12	0	1	26	8	0.08%	0.00%	0.01%	0.19%	0.06%
Mixed race or Multiracial (NH)	x	x	61	90	300	x	x	0.44%	0.66%	2.25%
Hispanic or Latino (any race)	22	42	85	237	327	0.15%	0.31%	0.62%	1.74%	2.46%
Total	14,309	13,584	13,804	13,587	13,317	100.00%	100.00%	100.00%	100.00%	100.00%

=== 2020 census ===
As of the 2020 census, the county had a population of 13,317. The median age was 46.0 years. 20.7% of residents were under the age of 18 and 22.4% of residents were 65 years of age or older. For every 100 females there were 102.9 males, and for every 100 females age 18 and over there were 103.6 males age 18 and over.

The population density was 19.7 people per square mile (7.6 people/km^{2}). There were 6,506 housing units at an average density of 9.6 units per square mile (3.7 units/km^{2}), of which 12.9% were vacant. Among occupied housing units, 76.4% were owner-occupied and 23.6% were renter-occupied. The homeowner vacancy rate was 0.8% and the rental vacancy rate was 7.6%.

The racial makeup of the county was 95.0% White, 0.3% Black or African American, 0.3% American Indian and Alaska Native, 0.2% Asian, 0.1% Native Hawaiian and Pacific Islander, 1.1% from some other race, and 3.0% from two or more races. Hispanic or Latino residents of any race comprised 2.5% of the population.

Less than 0.1% of residents lived in urban areas, while 100.0% lived in rural areas.

There were 5,667 households in the county, of which 25.3% had children under the age of 18 living in them. Of all households, 52.2% were married-couple households, 19.9% were households with a male householder and no spouse or partner present, and 19.1% were households with a female householder and no spouse or partner present. About 28.8% of all households were made up of individuals and 14.1% had someone living alone who was 65 years of age or older.

=== 2000 census ===
2000 Census Age Pyramid for Buffalo County

As of the census of 2000, there were 13,804 people, 5,511 households, and 3,780 families residing in the county. The population density was 20 people per square mile (7.7 people/km^{2}). There were 6,098 housing units at an average density of 9 units per square mile (3.5 units/km^{2}). The racial makeup of the county was 98.69% White, 0.12% Black or African American, 0.30% Native American, 0.33% Asian, 0.02% Pacific Islander, 0.08% from other races, and 0.46% from two or more races. 0.62% of the population were Hispanic or Latino of any race. 44.3% were of German, 22.1% Norwegian and 8.8% Polish ancestry. 96.9% spoke English, 1.6% Spanish and 1.1% German as their first language.

There were 5,511 households, out of which 30.80% had children under the age of 18 living with them, 58.90% were married couples living together, 6.20% had a female householder with no husband present, and 31.40% were non-families. 27.10% of all households were made up of individuals, and 12.60% had someone living alone who was 65 years of age or older. The average household size was 2.47 and the average family size was 3.01.

In the county, the population was spread out, with 25.10% under the age of 18, 6.90% from 18 to 24, 27.60% from 25 to 44, 23.70% from 45 to 64, and 16.80% who were 65 years of age or older. The median age was 39 years. For every 100 females there were 100.70 males. For every 100 females age 18 and over, there were 101.40 males.

In 2017, there were 121 births, giving a general fertility rate of 58.4 births per 1000 women aged 15–44, the 22nd lowest rate out of all 72 Wisconsin counties. 33 of the births were to unmarried mothers, 88 to married mothers. Additionally, there were fewer than five reported induced abortions performed on women of Buffalo County residence in 2017.

== Communities ==
=== Cities ===
- Alma (county seat)
- Buffalo City
- Fountain City
- Mondovi

=== Villages ===
- Cochrane
- Nelson

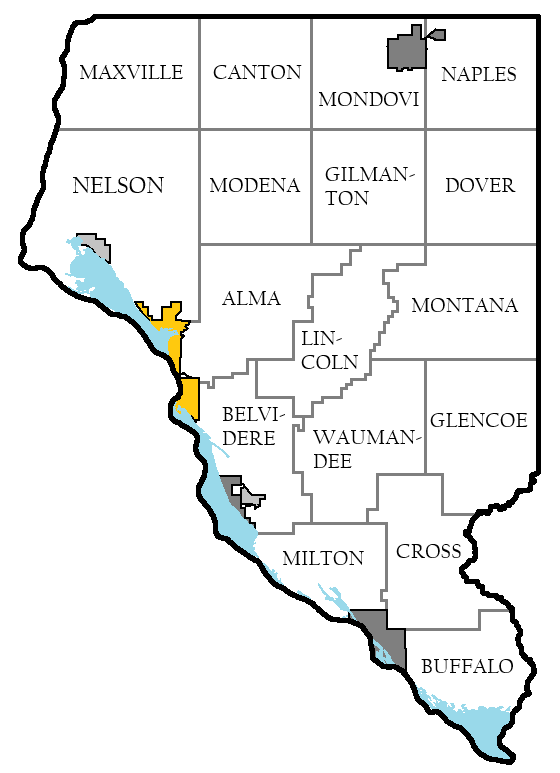
Towns of Buffalo County

=== Towns ===
- Alma
- Belvidere
- Buffalo
- Canton
- Cross
- Dover
- Gilmanton
- Glencoe
- Lincoln
- Maxville
- Milton
- Modena
- Mondovi
- Montana
- Naples
- Nelson
- Waumandee

=== Census-designated places ===
- Gilmanton
- Waumandee

=== Other unincorporated communities ===
- Bluff Siding
- Cream
- Czechville
- Glencoe
- Herold
- Lookout
- Marshland
- Maxville
- Misha Mokwa
- Modena
- Montana
- Praag
- Tell
- Urne

=== Railroad junctions ===
- East Winona
- Trevino

=== Ghost towns/neighborhoods ===
- Anchorage
- Bohri
- Savoy
- Springdale

== Politics ==
United States presidential election results for Buffalo County, Wisconsin
Year	Republican		Democratic		Third party(ies)	
Year	No.	%	No.	%	No.	%
1892	1,523	49.46%	1,393	45.24%	163	5.29%
1896	2,301	61.89%	1,302	35.02%	115	3.09%
1900	2,091	62.40%	1,205	35.96%	55	1.64%
1904	2,147	68.35%	911	29.00%	83	2.64%
1908	1,937	63.72%	1,027	33.78%	76	2.50%
1912	1,239	48.65%	848	33.29%	460	18.06%
1916	1,492	56.54%	1,043	39.52%	104	3.94%
1920	3,082	85.40%	299	8.28%	228	6.32%
1924	1,324	33.05%	176	4.39%	2,506	62.56%
1928	3,027	61.88%	1,836	37.53%	29	0.59%
1932	1,711	34.03%	3,252	64.68%	65	1.29%
1936	2,481	40.05%	3,434	55.44%	279	4.50%
1940	4,056	60.76%	2,516	37.69%	103	1.54%
1944	3,416	63.19%	1,948	36.03%	42	0.78%
1948	2,350	47.07%	2,563	51.33%	80	1.60%
1952	4,233	67.92%	1,988	31.90%	11	0.18%
1956	3,387	59.83%	2,266	40.03%	8	0.14%
1960	3,464	55.37%	2,790	44.60%	2	0.03%
1964	2,091	36.31%	3,663	63.60%	5	0.09%
1968	2,992	54.21%	2,112	38.27%	415	7.52%
1972	3,079	54.40%	2,461	43.48%	120	2.12%
1976	2,844	44.25%	3,448	53.65%	135	2.10%
1980	3,569	48.11%	3,276	44.16%	573	7.72%
1984	3,325	52.74%	2,921	46.34%	58	0.92%
1988	2,783	44.08%	3,481	55.14%	49	0.78%
1992	2,029	29.19%	2,996	43.11%	1,925	27.70%
1996	1,800	32.39%	2,681	48.25%	1,076	19.36%
2000	3,038	45.75%	3,237	48.74%	366	5.51%
2004	3,502	46.13%	3,998	52.67%	91	1.20%
2008	2,923	41.76%	3,949	56.41%	128	1.83%
2012	3,364	47.79%	3,570	50.72%	105	1.49%
2016	4,048	57.99%	2,525	36.17%	408	5.84%
2020	4,834	61.85%	2,860	36.59%	122	1.56%
2024	5,213	64.36%	2,765	34.14%	122	1.51%

Between 1948 and 1984, Buffalo County voted for the nationwide winner in every election with the exception of the very close 1960 election. Then, from 1988 to 2012, like most of the rural counties in southwestern Wisconsin, it backed the Democratic candidate in each election, and did so by more than a 6% margin each time except for 2000 and 2012, which were both decided by less than a 3% margin. The results from 2012 foreshadowed the shift in the electorate in Buffalo County, as in 2016, once again like the rest of rural southwestern Wisconsin, the county dramatically swung to the right, shifting 25 points and giving a 22% victory to Republican Donald Trump. Trump further expanded his margin of victory to over 25% in 2020 and to over 30% in 2024, achieving the two highest vote shares for a Republican in the county since Dwight D. Eisenhower in his 1952 landslide victory.

== Notable people ==
- Chauncey H. Cooke (1846–1919), American soldier in the U.S. Civil War

== See also ==
- National Register of Historic Places listings in Buffalo County, Wisconsin
- Trempealeau National Wildlife Refuge
- Upper Mississippi River National Wildlife and Fish Refuge
