= Gilmanton (community), Wisconsin =

Census-designated place in Wisconsin, United States

Gilmanton, Wisconsin
- Census-designated place
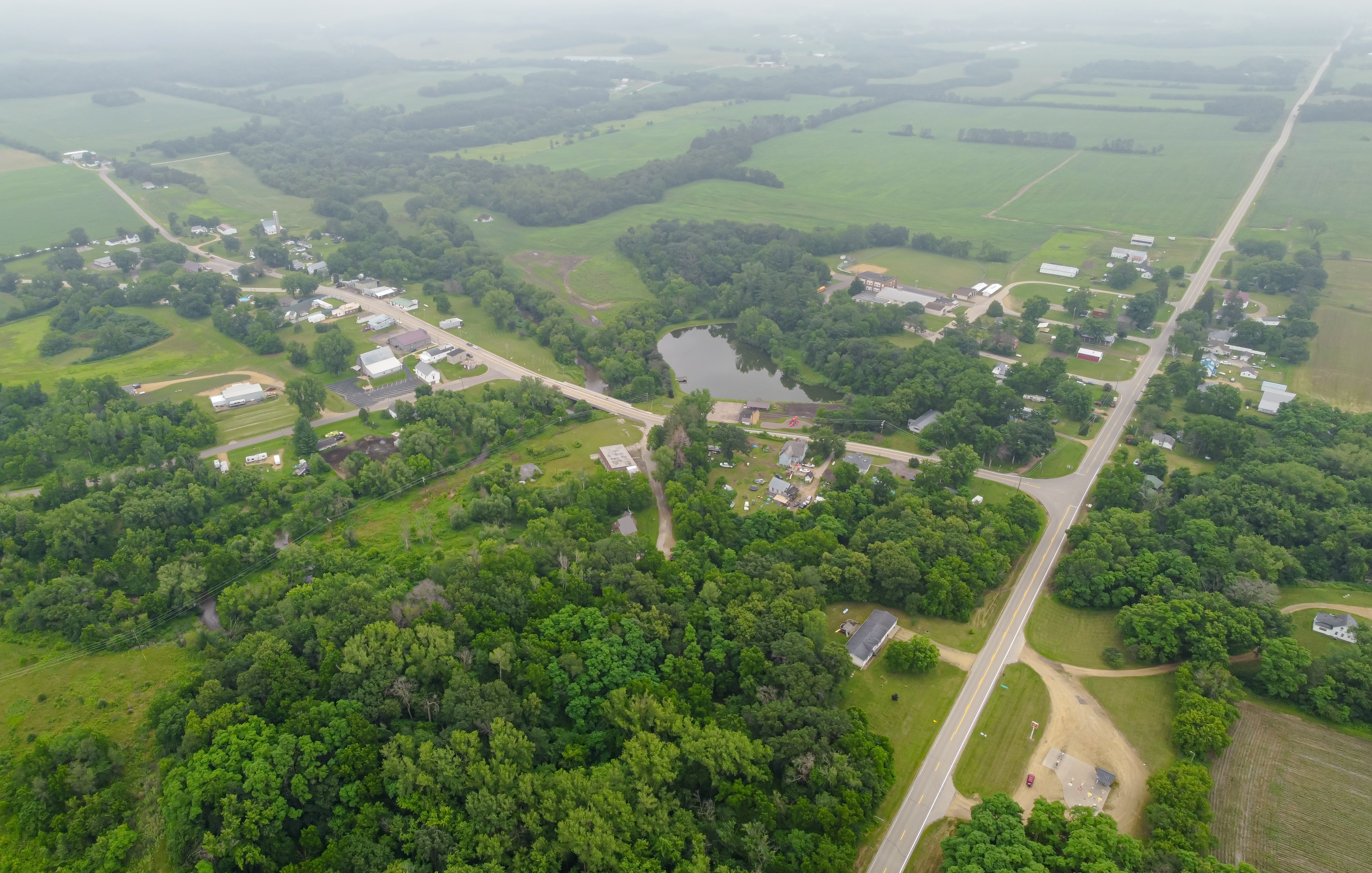
- Wis-88 and Wis-121 junction in town

- Location within Wisconsin Location within the United States
- Coordinates: 44°28′15″N 91°40′34″W
- Country: United States
- State: Wisconsin
- County: Buffalo
- Town: Gilmanton

Area
  - Total: 3.378 sq mi (8.75 km^{2})
  - Land: 3.345 sq mi (8.66 km^{2})
  - Water: 0.033 sq mi (0.085 km^{2})
- Elevation: 781 ft (238 m)

Population (2017)
  - Total: 131
  - Density: 39.2/sq mi (15.1/km^{2})
- Time zone: UTC-6 (Central (CST))
  - Summer (DST): UTC-5 (CDT)
- ZIP code: 54743
- Area codes: 715 & 534
- GNIS feature ID: 1565537

Gilmanton (/ˈɡɪlməntən/ GHIL-mən-tən) is a census-designated place located in the town of Gilmanton, in Buffalo County, Wisconsin, United States. Gilmanton is located at the junction of Wisconsin highways 88 and 121, 7 miles (11 km) south of Mondovi. Gilmanton has a post office with ZIP code 54743. Its population was 131 in 2017.
