= Eleva, Wisconsin =

- Village
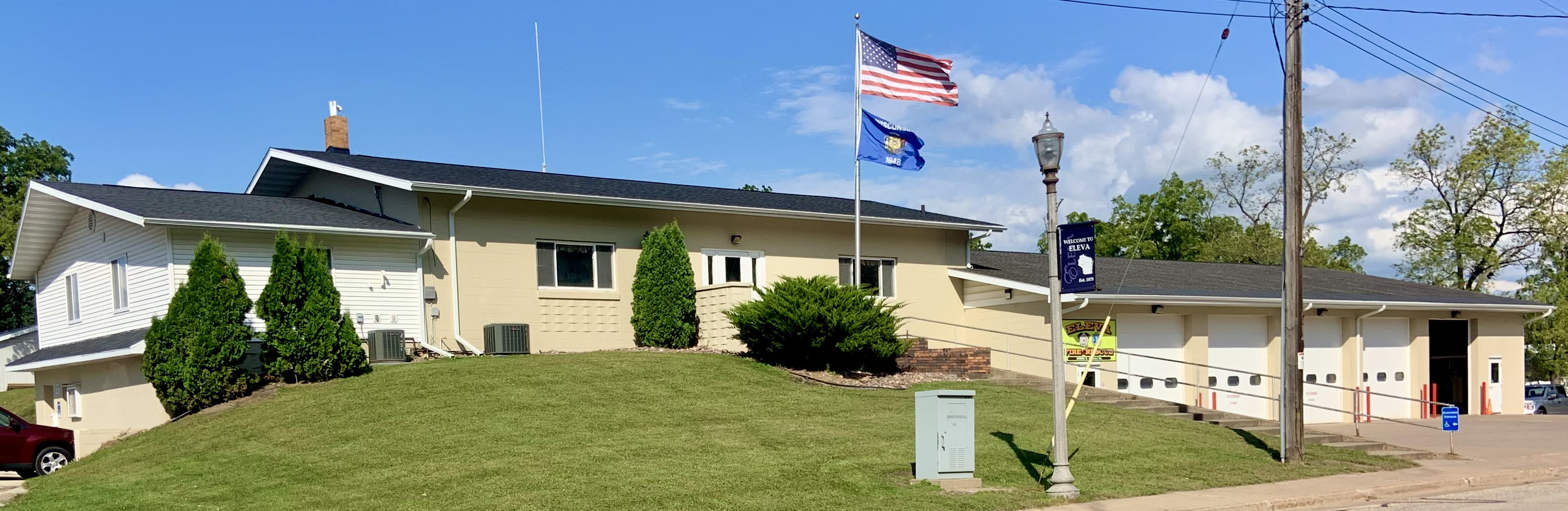
- Village hall

- Location of Eleva in Trempealeau County, Wisconsin.
- Coordinates: 44°34′31″N 91°28′16″W
- Country: United States
- State: Wisconsin
- County: Trempealeau

Area
  - Total: 0.58 sq mi (1.50 km^{2})
  - Land: 0.56 sq mi (1.46 km^{2})
  - Water: 0.015 sq mi (0.04 km^{2})
- Elevation: 863 ft (263 m)

Population (2020)
  - Total: 685
  - Density: 1,270/sq mi (489/km^{2})
- Time zone: UTC−6 (Central (CST))
  - Summer (DST): UTC−5 (CDT)
- ZIP Code: 54738
- Area codes: 715 & 534
- FIPS code: 55-23175
- GNIS feature ID: 1564504

Eleva (/əˈliːvə/ ə-LEE-və) is a village within the Town of Albion in Trempealeau County, Wisconsin, United States, situated along the Buffalo River. The population was 670 at the 2010 Census and reached 685 in the 2020 Census.

== History ==
Before white settlement, Lakota and Ho-Chunk Indians controlled the area that would become Eleva, but Ojibwe territory lay only ten miles north, across the Chippewa River. The first settlers in what would become the town of Albion arrived in 1856. Most settled east of the future Eleva, around what would be called Hamlin, on the stage road from Whitehall to Eau Claire. In these early days some Indians still migrated through in the spring and fall, camping just west of where Eleva would grow. William Moon, one of the first settlers, harvested potatoes that first fall of 1856 - the first harvest in Albion. In following years more settlers arrived, and began growing wheat and corn.

The first building in what would become Eleva was constructed in 1863, when Joseph and Elizabeth Cooper built a cabin of tamarack logs near Big Creek. They left when Joseph volunteered in the Union Army, but returned to their cabin after the war. David J. O'dell settled nearby in 1867.

In 1876 John Redford and Marsh Goddard arrived, starting a combination general store and blacksmith shop. Goddard hauled most of his goods by horse and wagon from the train station in Augusta. That same year, Philo Englesby built a hotel. The following year E.J. Carpenter started a grist mill on Big Creek which ground wheat between two big flat stones. That year the community added a second general store, a hardware store, a drug store, a confectionery, a meat shop, and a boarding house. Perhaps because the community was growing so fast, an 1877 map labelled it "New Chicago."

The village was platted in 1877. The source of the name "Eleva" has long been debated, with these possible origins:

1. Some say "Eleva" is how Indians pronounced "I leave you" when they left.
2. Some say it was named after a place in Ireland.
3. Some say that "ELEVA" was painted on a grain elevator, and then winter struck before the painter could finish "TOR". Newcomers assumed the letters were the name of the village.
4. Some say the town was named after a French village by Goddard, who was from France.
5. Some say it was named for Goddard's daughter Eva, who died young.

The community's first school was built in 1885, but it was two miles east, called Grant School for the farmer who rented the school land. This Grant was also the chairman of the school district, and a second cousin of President Ulysses S. Grant. A post office called Eleva started operation in one of the town's stores the same year.

In 1889 Nathaniel Foster's Fairchild and Mississippi Railroad reached Eleva, following the Buffalo (then Beef) River. Foster added a lumber yard in Eleva and the railroad built a depot in 1890. A few years later Foster's railroad was acquired by the Chicago, St. Paul, Minneapolis and Omaha Railway.

In 1890 Henry Ruseling replaced his old stone grist mill with the modern-for-the-time Eleva Roller Mills, powered by water or coal, producing 50 barrels of wheat per day. That year, the town built its own school in town, serving grades one through eight. The town was booming, with two elevators, a cheese factory, a flour and feed mill, a hardware store, a drug store, a printer, a photographer, a tailor, a shoemaker, two plumbers, two blacksmiths, a doctor, an implement dealer, two hay buyers, and two livestock dealers. The town had no saloons. With all these services in Eleva and the railroad bypassing Hamlin two miles to the east, Hamlin gradually dried up.

In 1901 the Osseo Telephone Company opened an exchange in Eleva. In 1902 Eleva incorporated as a village, with population around 314. That same year, Eleva replaced its 1890 school with a new brick school that taught grades one through ten, making it a state-graded school. The following year the Bank of Eleva was organized.

In 1914 the village began to furnish electric service. At first the electricity was on only in the evenings, with extended hours on Tuesdays so the women could do their ironing.

In 1917, Eleva's school became a high school, running through grade twelve. That served the community until 1950, when the shared Eleva-Strum high school was built midway between the two towns. Eleva itself built a new grade school in 1960.

== Geography ==
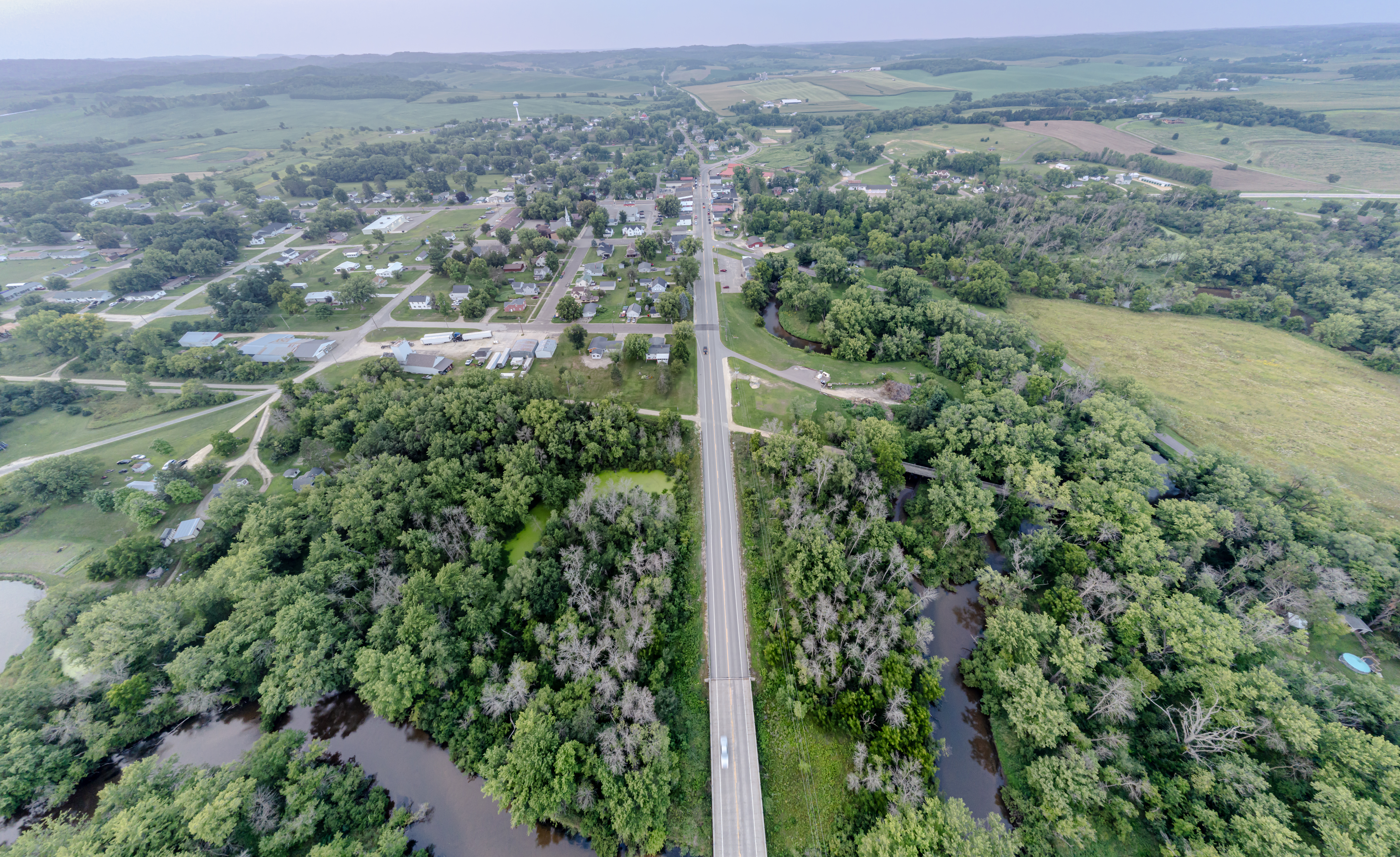
An aerial view of Eleva

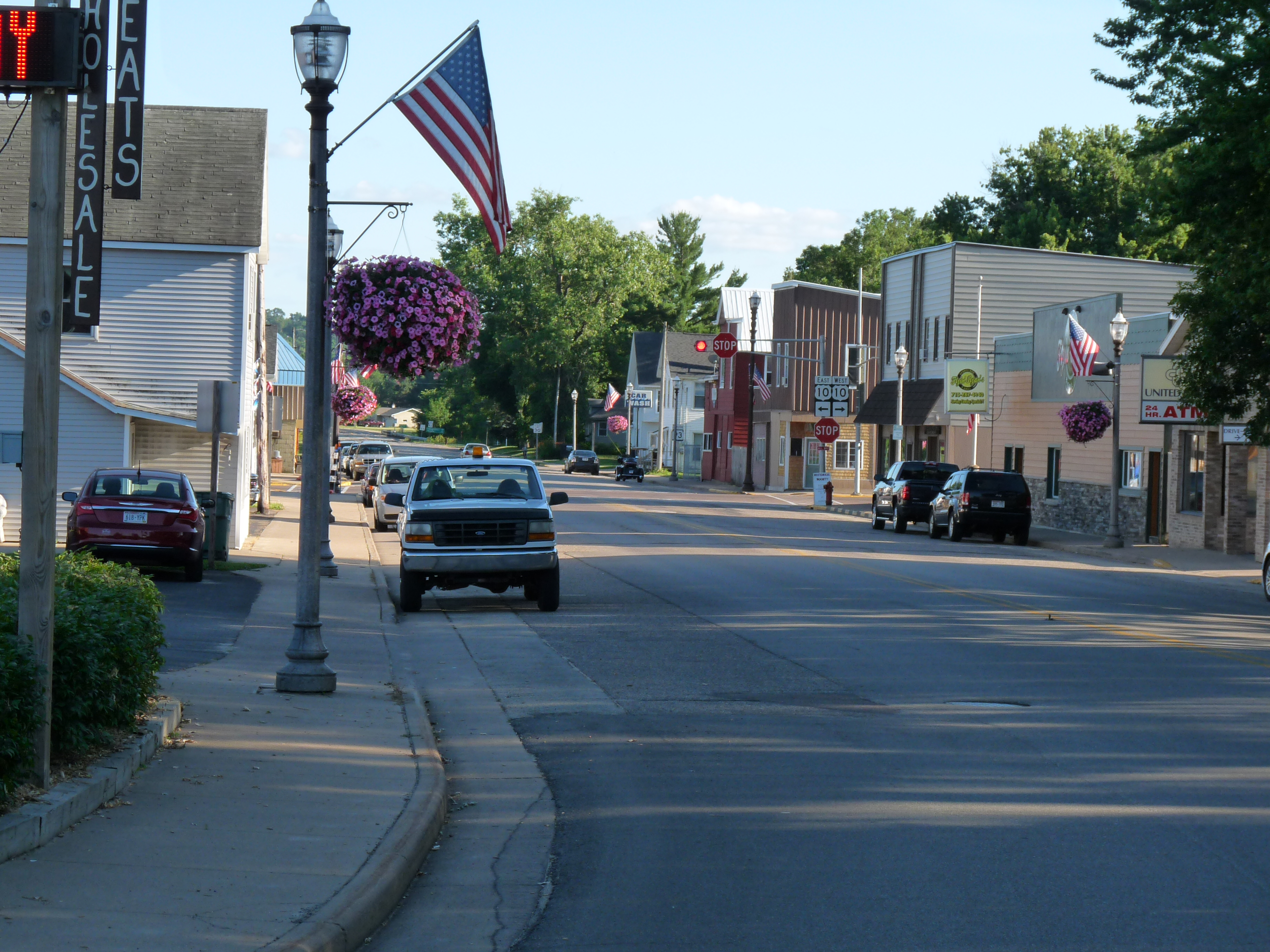
Eleva's downtown in 2016

Eleva is located at 44°34′31″N 91°28′16″W (44.575298, −91.471019).

According to the United States Census Bureau, the village has a total area of 0.60 square miles (1.55 km^{2}), of which 0.58 square miles (1.50 km^{2}) is land and 0.02 square miles (0.05 km^{2}) is water.

== Demographics ==
Historical population
Census	Pop.	Note	%±
1910	319		—
1920	379		18.8%
1930	357		−5.8%
1940	406		13.7%
1950	479		18.0%
1960	548		14.4%
1970	574		4.7%
1980	593		3.3%
1990	491		−17.2%
2000	635		29.3%
2010	670		5.5%
2020	685		2.2%
U.S. Decennial Census

=== 2010 census ===
As of the census of 2010, there were 670 people, 292 households, and 181 families living in the village. The population density was 1,155.2 inhabitants per square mile (446.0/km^{2}). There were 305 housing units at an average density of 525.9 per square mile (203.1/km^{2}). The racial makeup of the village was 97.9% White, 0.1% Native American, 0.3% Asian, 0.7% from other races, and 0.9% from two or more races. Hispanic or Latino of any race were 1.3% of the population.

There were 292 households, of which 33.6% had children under the age of 18 living with them, 44.2% were married couples living together, 11.6% had a female householder with no husband present, 6.2% had a male householder with no wife present, and 38.0% were non-families. Of all households, 31.2% were made up of individuals, and 16.8% had someone living alone who was 65 years of age or older. The average household size was 2.29 and the average family size was 2.86.

The median age in the village was 39.5 years. 24.5% of residents were under the age of 18; 8.1% were between the ages of 18 and 24; 26% were from 25 to 44; 23.9% were from 45 to 64; and 17.6% were 65 years of age or older. The gender makeup of the village was 48.7% male and 51.3% female.

=== 2000 census ===
As of the census of 2000, there were 635 people, 277 households, and 175 families living in the village. The population density was 1,169.0 people per square mile (454.0/km^{2}). There were 290 housing units at an average density of 533.9 per square mile (207.4/km^{2}). The racial makeup of the village was 98.43% White, 0.16% African American, 0.16% Native American, 0.16% Asian, and 1.10% from two or more races.

There were 277 households, out of which 26.7% had children under the age of 18 living with them, 49.5% were married couples living together, 9.4% had a female householder with no husband present, and 36.8% were non-families. Of all households, 33.9% were made up of individuals, and 15.9% had someone living alone who was 65 years of age or older. The average household size was 2.29 and the average family size was 2.89.

In the village, the population was spread out, with 23.5% under the age of 18, 7.1% from 18 to 24, 28.7% from 25 to 44, 21.3% from 45 to 64, and 19.5% who were 65 years of age or older. The median age was 38 years. For every 100 females, there were 98.4 males. For every 100 females age 18 and over, there were 92.1 males.

The median income for a household in the village was $31,250, and the median income for a family was $41,964. Males had a median income of $30,294 versus $21,618 for females. The per capita income for the village was $15,814. About 5.6% of families and 9.5% of the population were below the poverty line, including 11.6% of those under age 18 and 8.1% of those age 65 or over.
