= Buffalo River (Wisconsin) =

River in Wisconsin, United States

Coordinates: 44°21′02″N 91°55′35″W

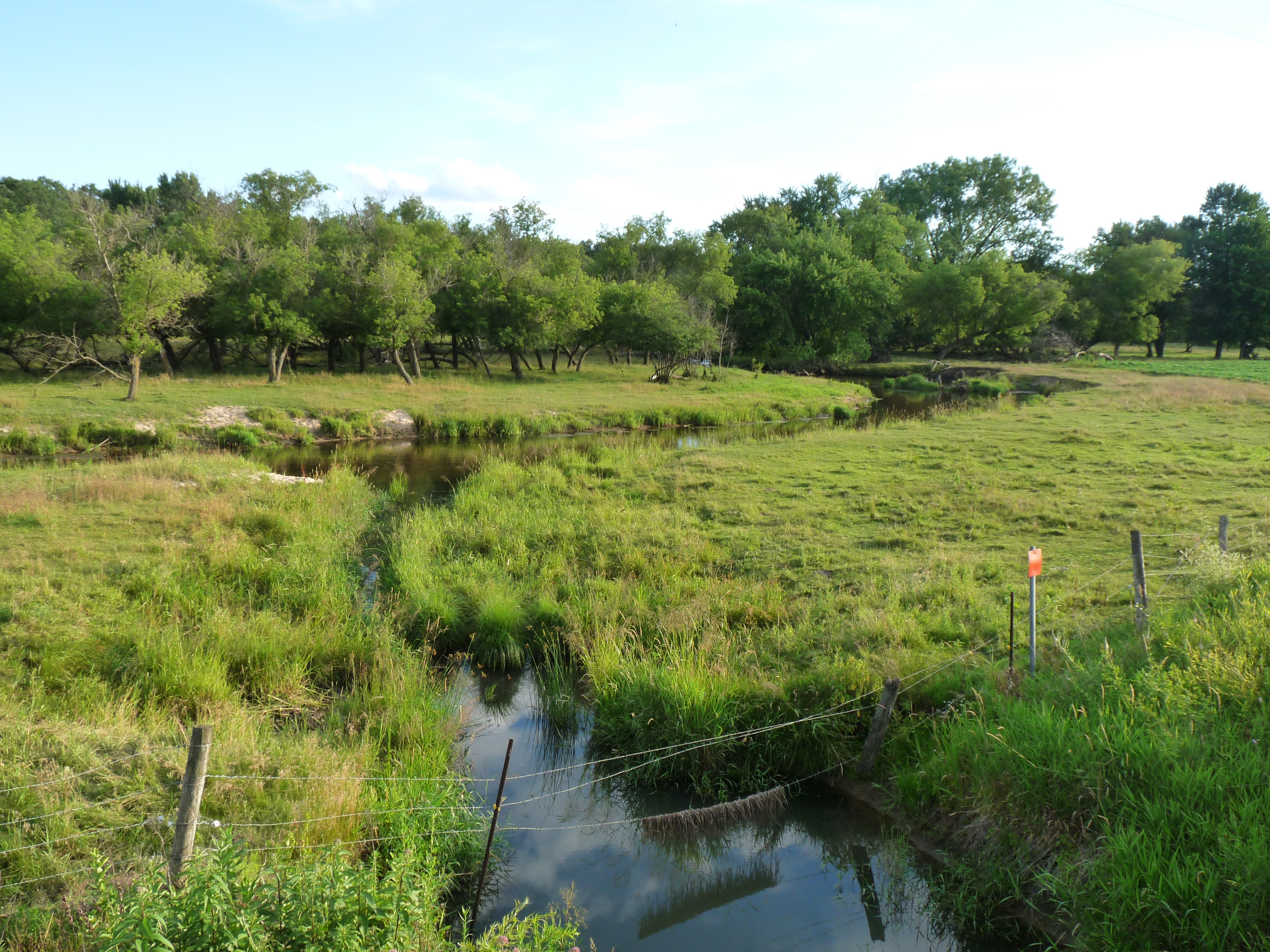
Upper reaches, just west of Osseo

The Buffalo River is a 68.7-mile-long (110.6 km) left-tributary of the Mississippi River in western Wisconsin in the United States.

== Course ==
The Buffalo River is formed at Osseo in northeastern Trempealeau County by the confluence of its North and South Forks, both of which are about 16 miles (26 km) long and rise in northwestern Jackson County; the North Fork has at times been considered the main stem of the river. From Osseo, the Buffalo flows westwardly into Buffalo County, past Strum, Eleva and Mondovi. At Mondovi the river turns southwestward for the remainder of its course; it flows into the Mississippi River 2 miles (3 km) northwest of Alma.

For the last 5 miles (8 km) of the Buffalo's course, it is surrounded by marshland, before emptying into Rieck's Lake, a migratory stopover for thousands of tundra swans and other waterfowl. Rieck's Lake empties out into a riverine lake, called Buffalo Slough, part of Pool 4 on the Mississippi River.

== Variant names ==
The United States Board on Geographic Names settled on "Buffalo River" as the stream's official name in 1930, and settled on the North Fork's name in 1969. According to the Geographic Names Information System, the Buffalo River has also been known as:

- Beef River
- Beef Slough
- River of Wild Bulls
- Riviere de Beeufs

== See also ==
- List of Wisconsin rivers
