= Cochrane, Wisconsin =

- Village
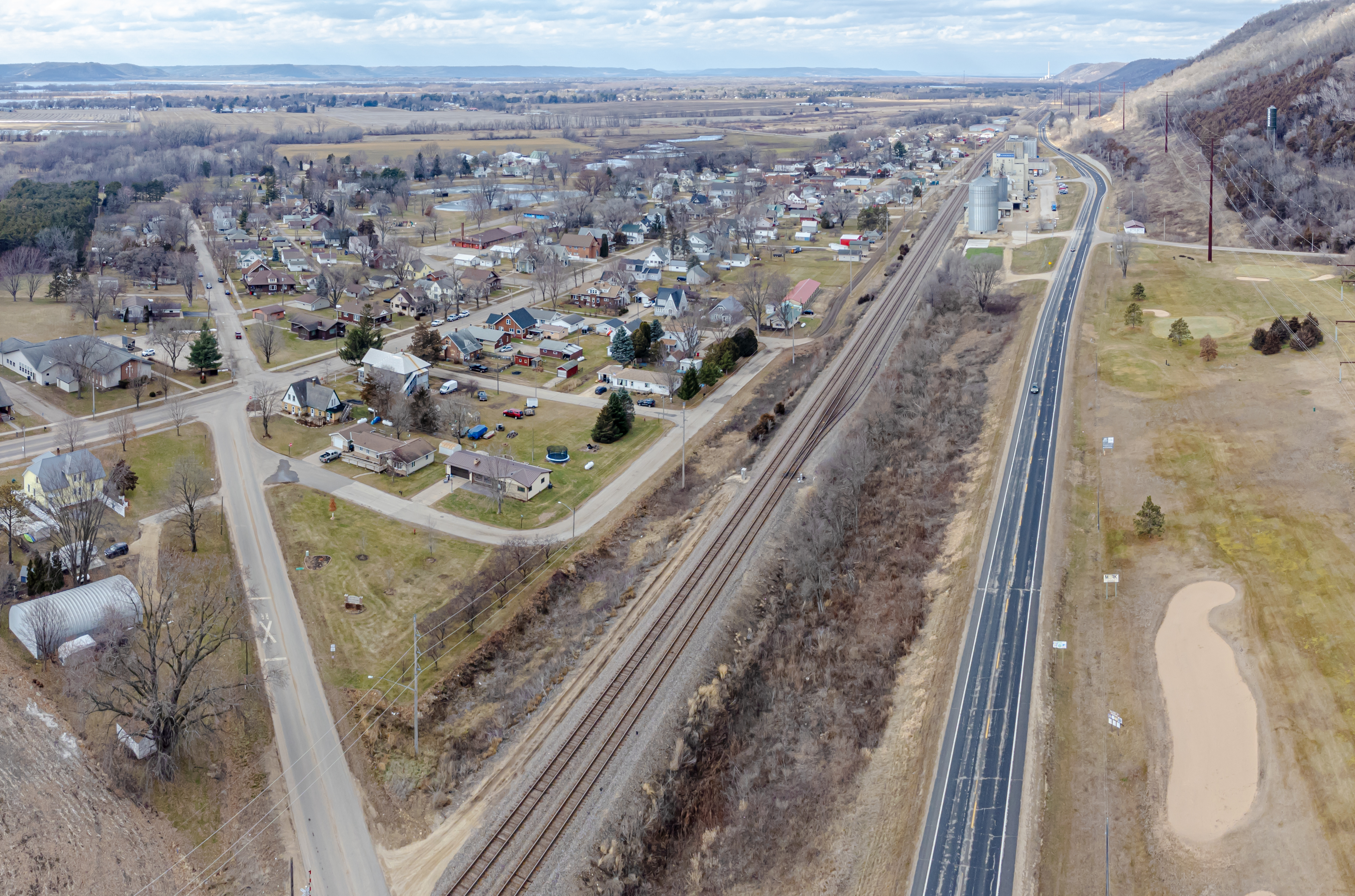

- Location of Cochrane in Buffalo County, Wisconsin.
- Coordinates: 44°13′40″N 91°50′9″W
- Country: United States
- State: Wisconsin
- County: Buffalo

Area
  - Total: 0.78 sq mi (2.03 km^{2})
  - Land: 0.78 sq mi (2.01 km^{2})
  - Water: 0.012 sq mi (0.03 km^{2})
- Elevation: 673 ft (205 m)

Population (2020)
  - Total: 423
  - Density: 545/sq mi (210/km^{2})
- Time zone: UTC-6 (Central (CST))
  - Summer (DST): UTC-5 (CDT)
- Area code: 608
- FIPS code: 55-16025
- GNIS feature ID: 1563221
- Website: www.cochranewisconsin.com

Cochrane is a village in Buffalo County in the U.S. state of Wisconsin. The population was 423 at the 2020 census.

== History ==
Cochrane began in 1885 as a settlement along the railroad and was initially named St. Petersburg. After a railroad conductor was injured in the town, it was renamed Cochrane in his honor. The village was officially incorporated in 1910.

== Geography ==
According to the United States Census Bureau, the village has a total area of 0.80 square miles (2.07 km^{2}), of which 0.78 square miles (2.02 km^{2}) is land and 0.02 square miles (0.05 km^{2}) is water.

== Demographics ==
Historical population
Census	Pop.	Note	%±
1920	305		—
1930	418		37.0%
1940	458		9.6%
1950	444		−3.1%
1960	455		2.5%
1970	506		11.2%
1980	512		1.2%
1990	475		−7.2%
2000	435		−8.4%
2010	450		3.4%
2020	423		−6.0%
U.S. Decennial Census

=== 2010 census ===
As of the census of 2010, there were 450 people, 205 households, and 116 families living in the village. The population density was 576.9 inhabitants per square mile (222.7/km^{2}). There were 234 housing units at an average density of 300.0 per square mile (115.8/km^{2}). The racial makeup of the village was 99.1% White and 0.9% from two or more races. Hispanic or Latino of any race were 0.7% of the population.

There were 205 households, of which 25.9% had children under the age of 18 living with them, 44.9% were married couples living together, 7.3% had a female householder with no husband present, 4.4% had a male householder with no wife present, and 43.4% were non-families. 39.5% of all households were made up of individuals, and 18.6% had someone living alone who was 65 years of age or older. The average household size was 2.20 and the average family size was 2.95.

The median age in the village was 43 years. 24.9% of residents were under the age of 18; 4.3% were between the ages of 18 and 24; 22.8% were from 25 to 44; 26.9% were from 45 to 64; and 21.1% were 65 years of age or older. The gender makeup of the village was 47.6% male and 52.4% female.

=== 2000 census ===
As of the census of 2000, there were 435 people, 188 households, and 128 families living in the village. The population density was 603.4 people per square mile (233.3/km^{2}). There were 197 housing units at an average density of 273.3 per square mile (105.6/km^{2}). The racial makeup of the village was 98.85% White, 0.23% Asian, 0.92% from other races. Hispanic or Latino of any race were 0.92% of the population.

There were 188 households, out of which 29.3% had children under the age of 18 living with them, 54.3% were married couples living together, 8.5% had a female householder with no husband present, and 31.9% were non-families. 28.7% of all households were made up of individuals, and 16.0% had someone living alone who was 65 years of age or older. The average household size was 2.27 and the average family size was 2.73.

In the village, the population was spread out, with 22.1% under the age of 18, 4.1% from 18 to 24, 29.7% from 25 to 44, 19.5% from 45 to 64, and 24.6% who were 65 years of age or older. The median age was 42 years. For every 100 females, there were 96.8 males. For every 100 females age 18 and over, there were 96.0 males.

The median income for a household in the village was $37,019, and the median income for a family was $40,375. Males had a median income of $26,042 versus $21,500 for females. The per capita income for the village was $18,309. About 2.8% of families and 6.3% of the population were below the poverty line, including 8.1% of those under age 18 and 9.2% of those age 65 or over.

== Education ==
Cochrane is part of the Cochrane-Fountain City School District. The school's athletic teams, the Pirates, compete in the Dairyland Conference. The C-FC Pirates' cross-country team was the Wisconsin Division III boys' state champion four consecutive years, from 1993 to 1996, and girls' state champion in 1996, 1998, and 1999. The Pirates have won six consecutive girls' volleyball conference championships, from 2009 to 2013 with the seasons of 2011, 2012 and 2013 all being undefeated in the Dairyland. The girls' softball team has won four consecutive conference championships, from 2009 to 2012. In March 2014, the C-FC Pirates' made their first state appearance for Division 5 Boys at the Kohl Center, in Madison, Wisconsin.

== Notable people ==
Notable people who were born or lived in Cochrane include:

- David I. Hammergren (1875–1944), politician

== Images ==
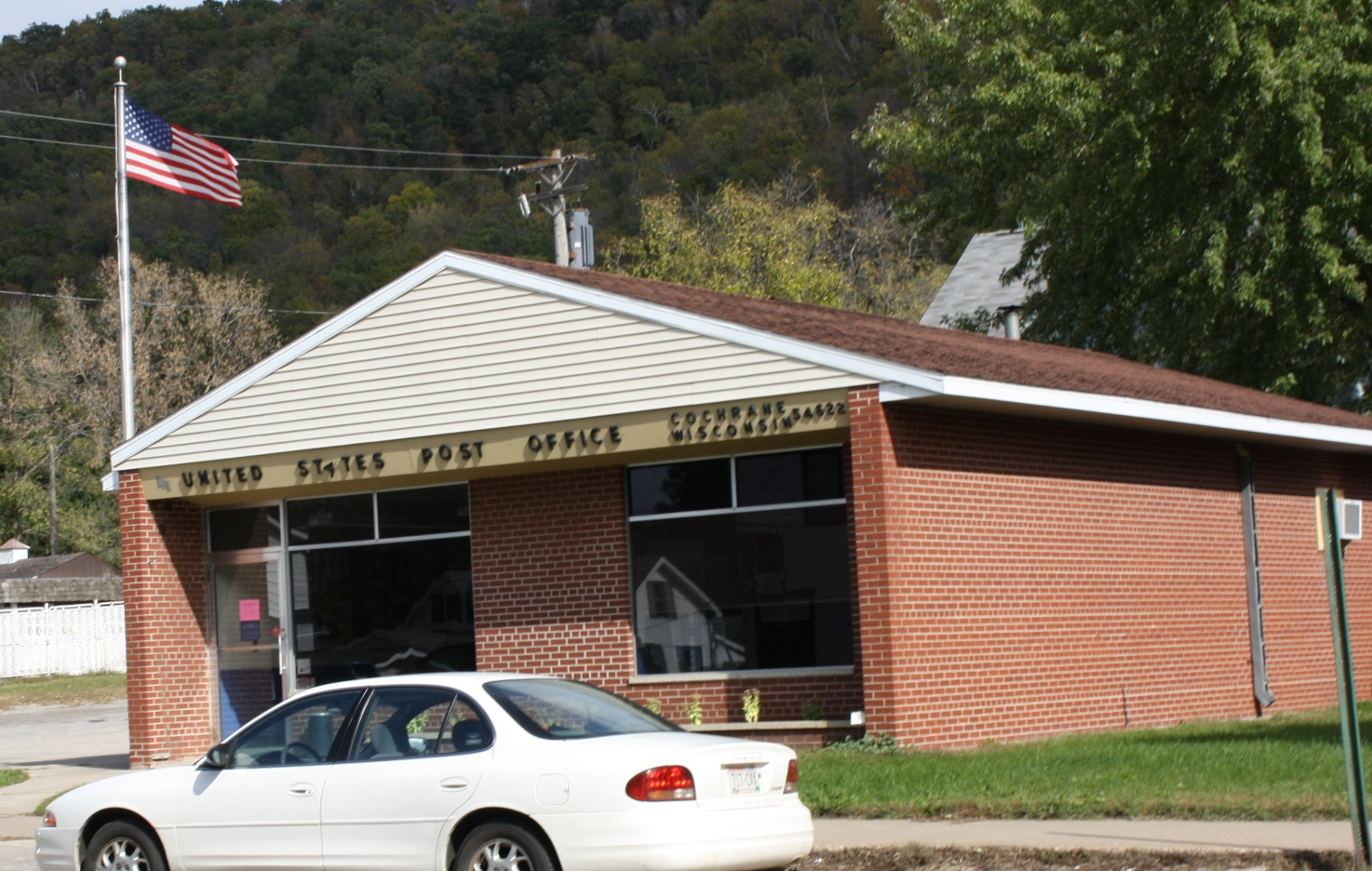
Post office

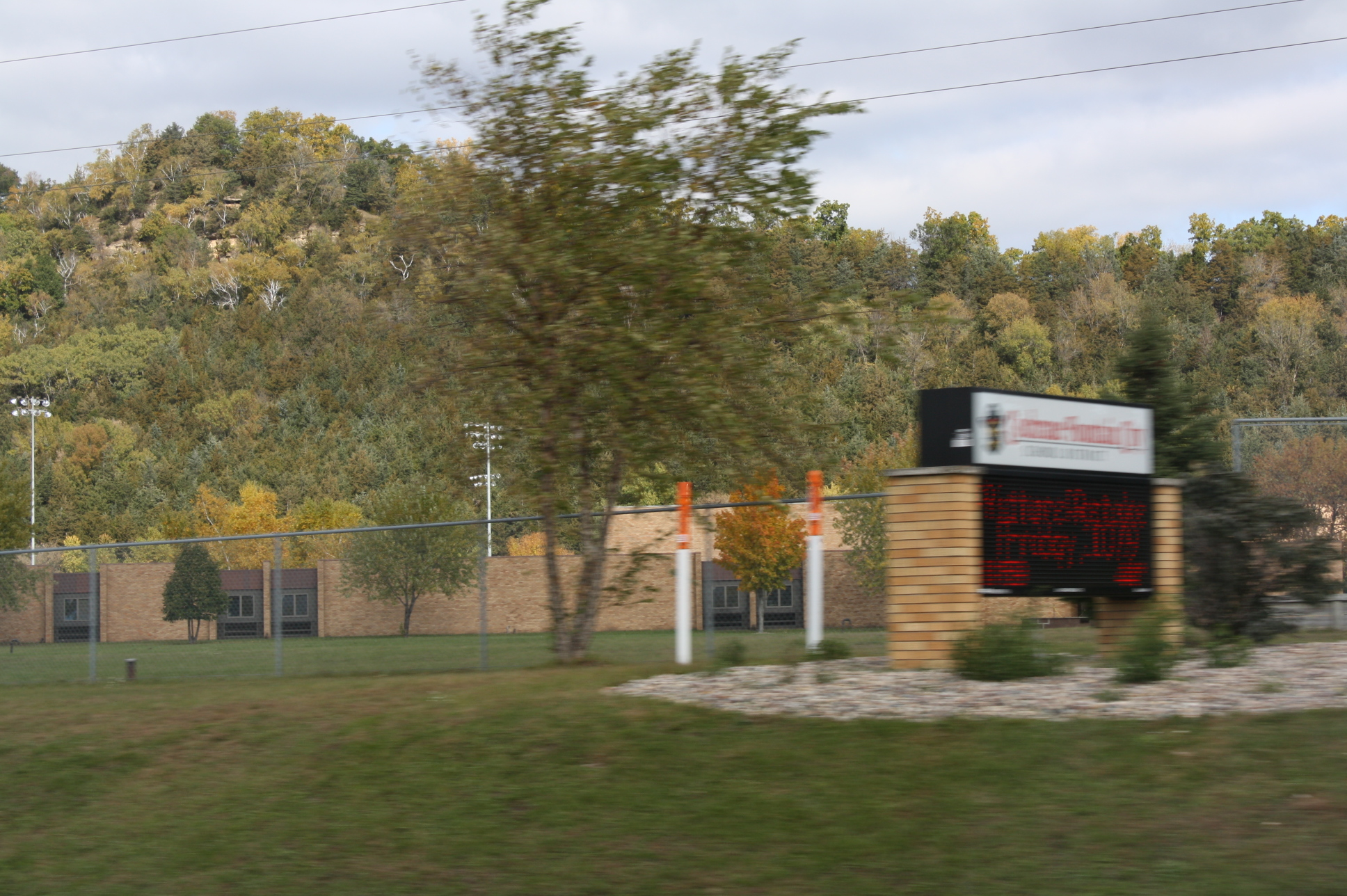
Cochrane-Fountain City High School

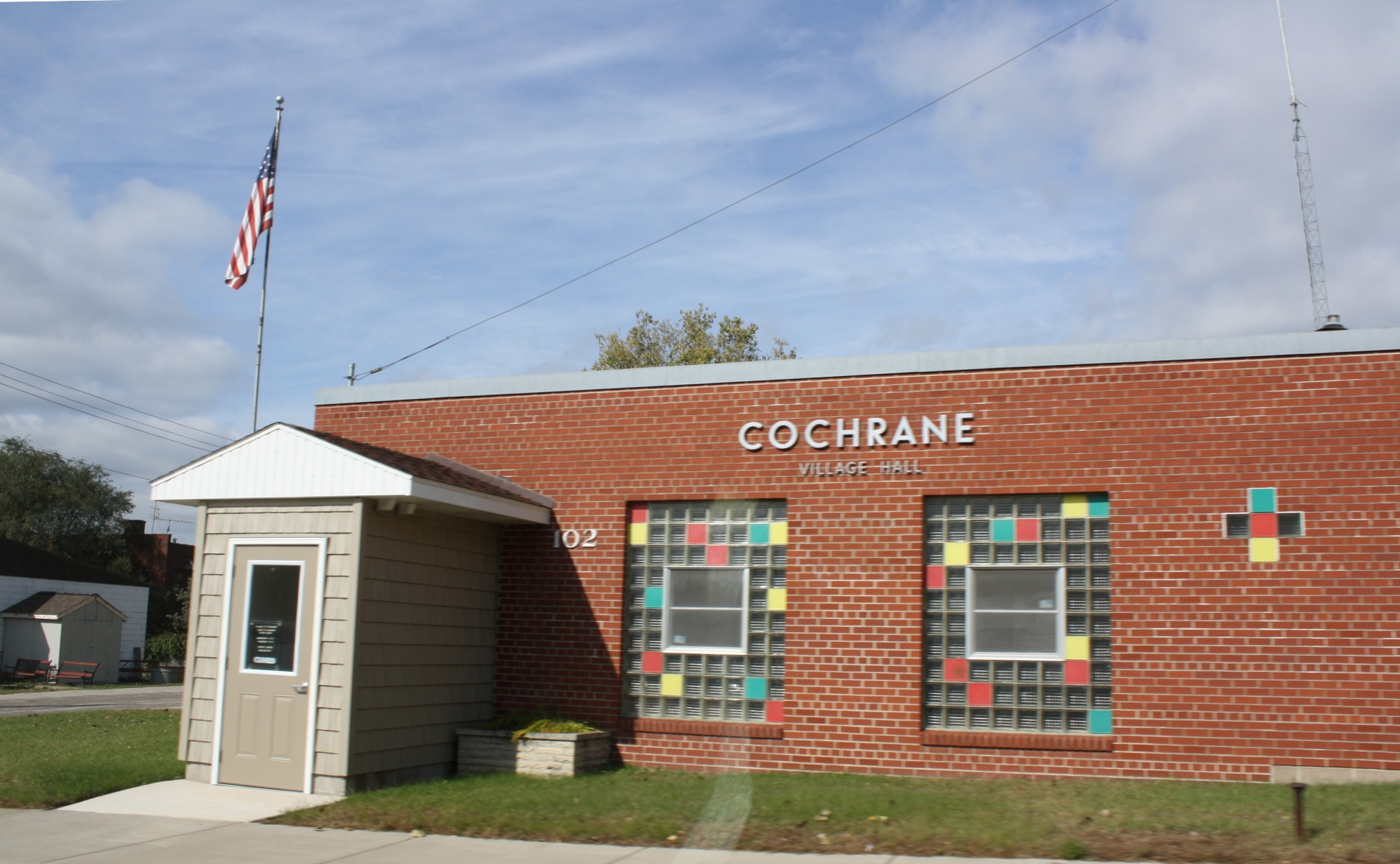
Village hall

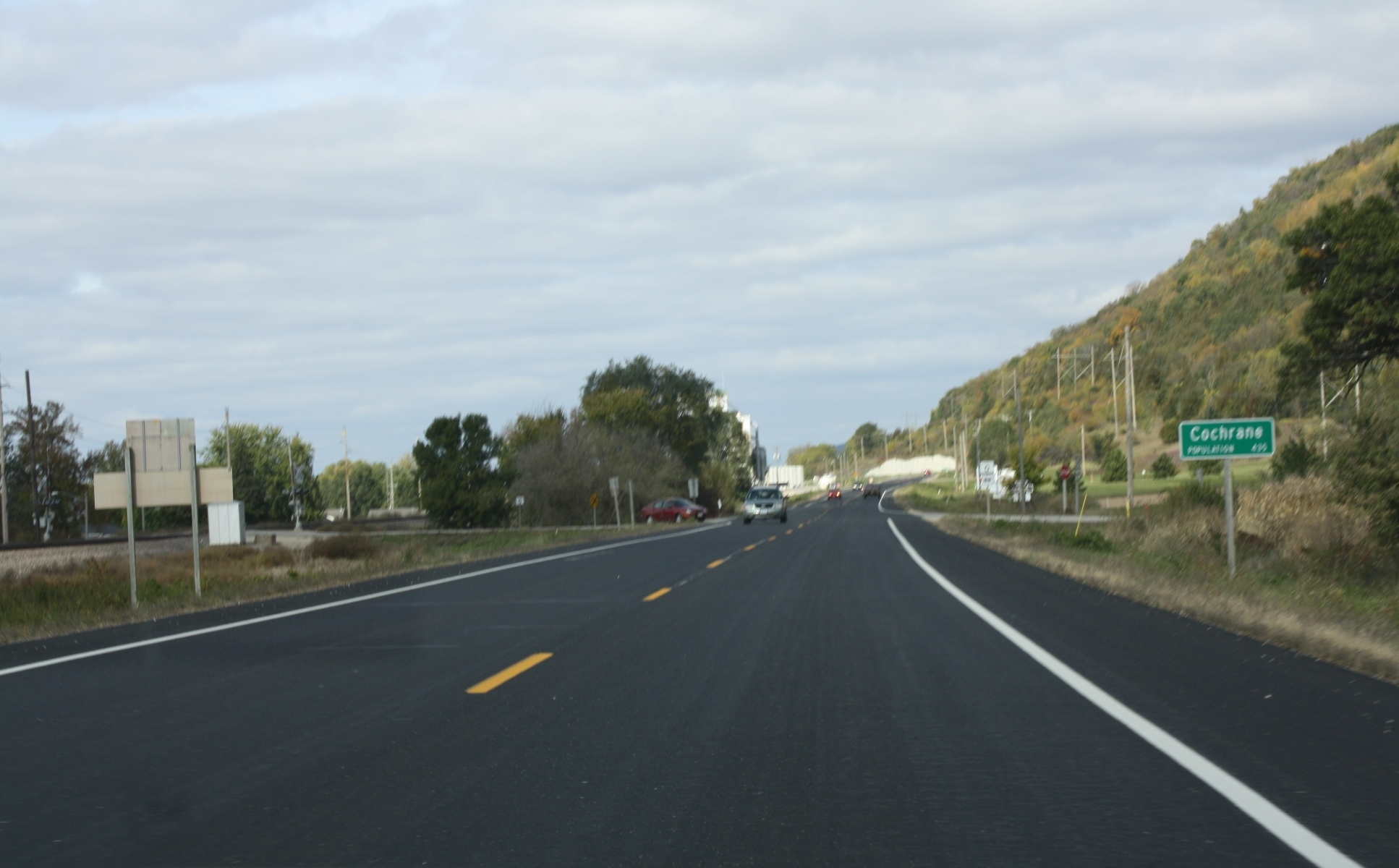
Looking north at DOT sign

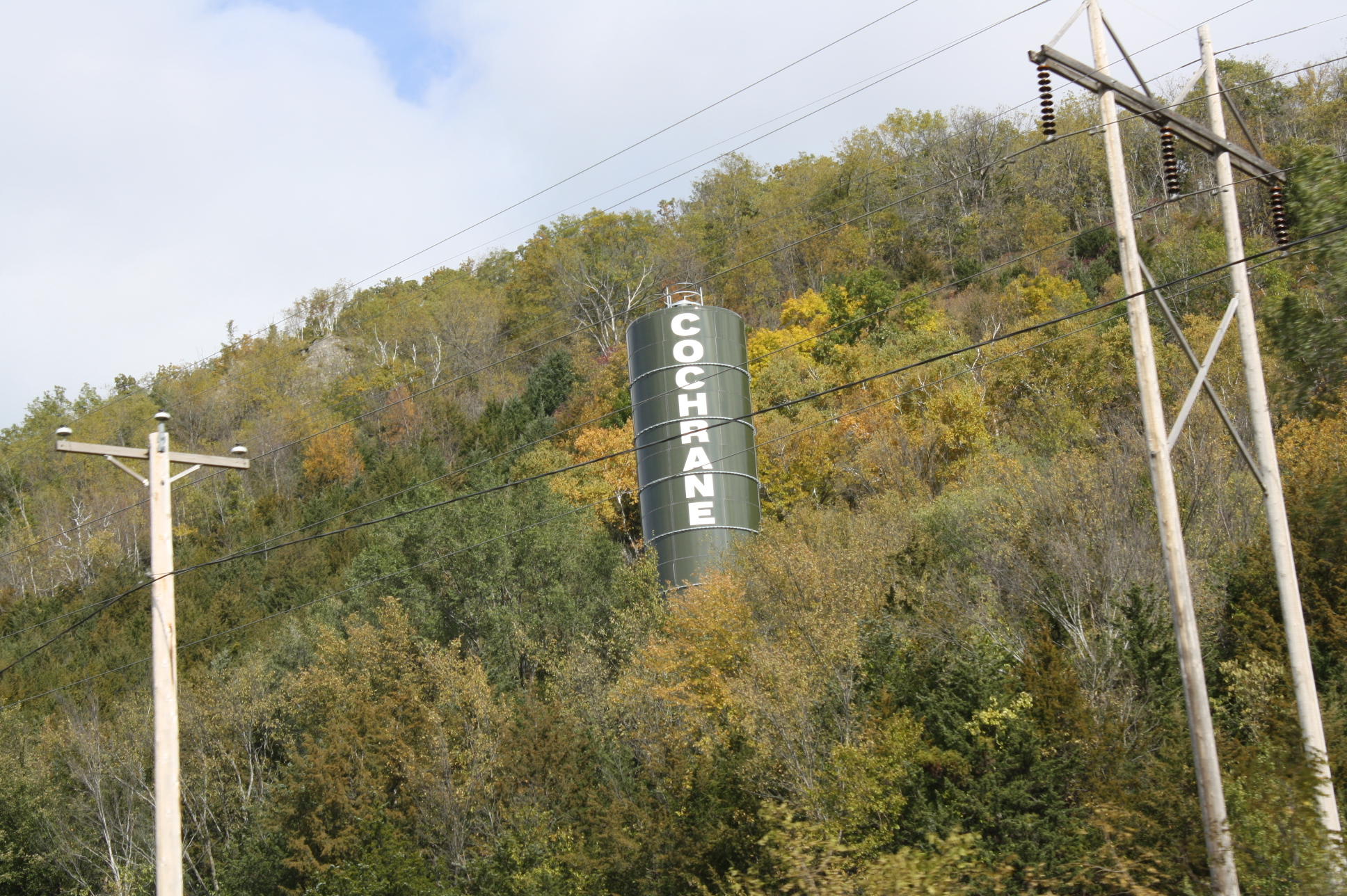
Water tower

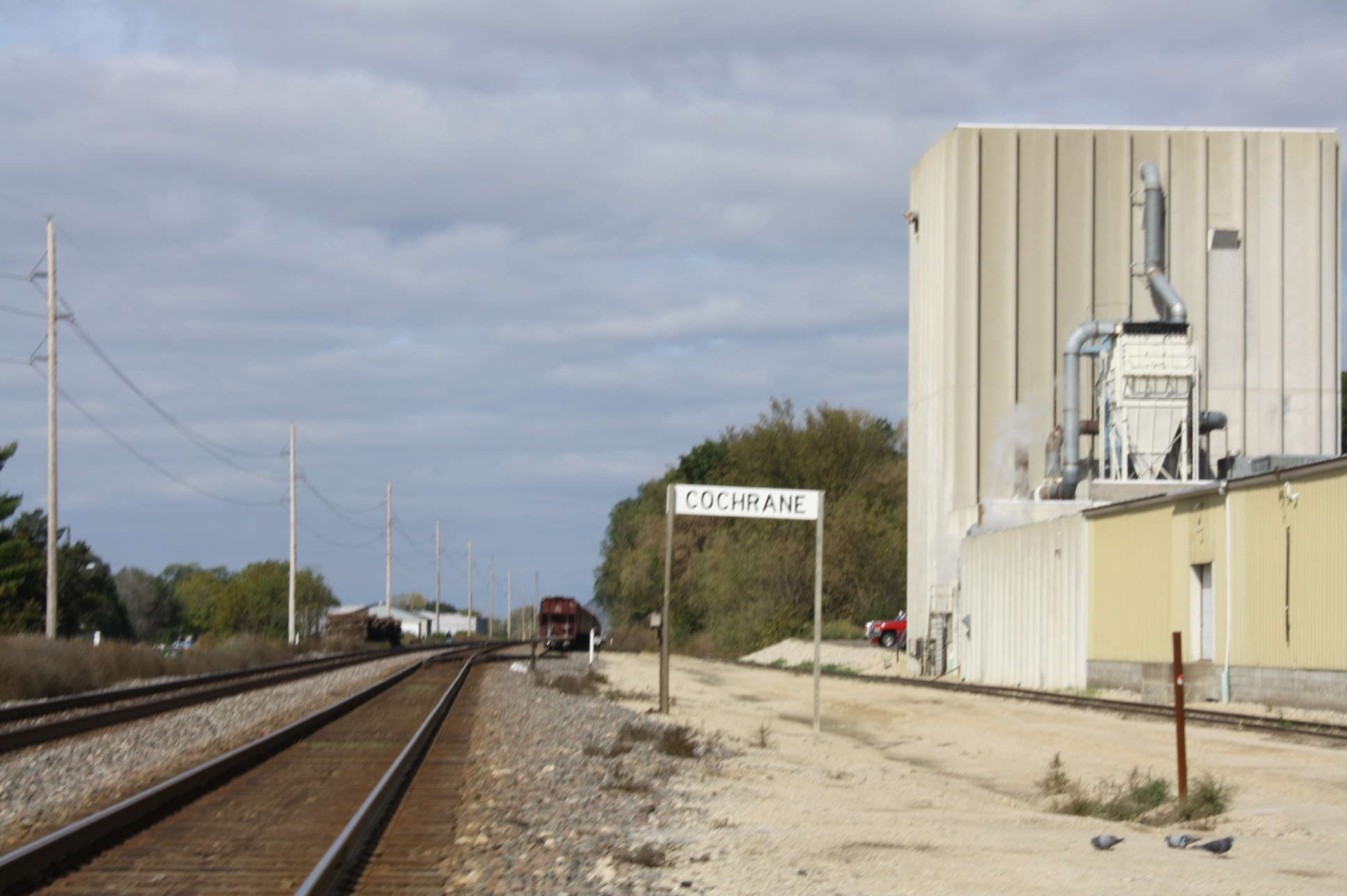
Railroad sign
