= Wisconsin Highway 121 =

State highway in Wisconsin, United States

State Trunk Highway 121
- WIS 121 highlighted in red

Route information
- Maintained by WisDOT
- Length: 45.07 mi (72.53 km)

Major junctions
- West end: WIS 88 in Gilmanton
- US 53 in Whitehall; US 53 in Pigeon Falls; I-94 in Northfield
- East end: WIS 95 west of Alma Center

Location
- Country: United States
- State: Wisconsin
- Counties: Buffalo, Trempealeau, Jackson

Highway system
- Wisconsin State Trunk Highway System; Interstate; US; State; Scenic; Rustic
← WIS 120	→ WIS 122

State Trunk Highway 121 (often called Highway 121, STH-121 or WIS 121) is a 45.07-mile (72.53 km) state highway in Buffalo, Trempealeau, and Jackson counties in the west-central area of the US state of Wisconsin that runs east–west from Gilmanton to near Alma Center.

== Route description ==
Starting at WIS 88 in Gilmanton, WIS 121 starts to travel eastward, passing through Lookout and Russell. Then, WIS 121 turns south along WIS 93. In Independence, WIS 121 leaves eastward away from WIS 93. Then, in Whitehall, WIS 121 begins to run concurrently with US Highway 53 (US 53). They then pass through Coral City. Then, in Pigeon Falls, WIS 121 branches eastward, passing through York and Northfield. In Northfield, it then meets Interstate 94 (I-94) at a diamond interchange. Continuing further east, WIS 121 then ends at WIS 95 west of Alma Center.

== Major intersections ==
County	Location	mi	km	Destinations	Notes
Buffalo	Gilmanton			WIS 88 – Mondovi, Fountain City	
Trempealeau	Town of Burnside			WIS 93 north – Eleva	Western end of WIS 93 concurrency
Trempealeau	Independence			WIS 93 south – Arcadia	Eastern end of WIS 93 concurrency
Trempealeau	Whitehall			US 53 south – Ettrick	Western end of US 53 concurrency
Trempealeau	Pigeon Falls			US 53 north – Osseo	Eastern end of US 53 concurrency
Jackson	Northfield			I-94 – Eau Claire, Madison	
Jackson	Town of Garden Valley			WIS 95 – Alma Center, Merrillan, Hixton	
1.000 mi = 1.609 km; 1.000 km = 0.621 mi: Concurrency terminus
