= Wisconsin Highway 53 =

State Trunk Highway 53

Route information
- Maintained by WisDOT
- Existed: 1918–1926

Location
- Country: United States
- State: Wisconsin

Highway system
- Wisconsin State Trunk Highway System; Interstate; US; State; Scenic; Rustic
← US 53	→ WIS 54

State Trunk Highway 53 (often called Highway 53, STH-53 or WIS 53) was a state highway in the U.S. state of Wisconsin. WIS 53 used to travel along these present-day routes:

- Wisconsin Highway 121 from Arcadia to Independence. WIS 53 had travel along present-day WIS 121 until 1923.
- Wisconsin Highway 93 from Independence to Whitehall. WIS 53 had travel along present-day WIS 93 until 1923.
- Wisconsin Highway 95 from Fountain City to Neillsville. WIS 53 had always been traveling along at least a large portion of present-day WIS 95 until 1926.
