= Northfield (community), Wisconsin =

Northfield, Wisconsin
- Unincorporated community
- Location within Wisconsin Location within the United States
- Coordinates: 44°27′33″N 91°05′59″W
- Country: United States
- State: Wisconsin
- County: Jackson
- Town: Northfield
- Elevation: 951 ft (290 m)
- Time zone: UTC-6 (Central (CST))
  - Summer (DST): UTC-5 (CDT)
- Area codes: 715 & 534
- GNIS feature ID: 1570525

Northfield is an unincorporated community located in the town of Northfield, Jackson County, Wisconsin, United States. Northfield is located at the junction of Interstate 94 and Wisconsin Highway 121, 7 miles (11 km) northwest of Hixton.
