= Wisconsin Highway 95 =

Highway in Wisconsin

State Trunk Highway 95
- WIS 95 highlighted in red

Route information
- Maintained by WisDOT
- Length: 73.76 mi (118.71 km)

Major junctions
- West end: WIS 35 in Fountain City
- US 53 in Blair; I-94 in Hixton; US 12 / WIS 27 in Merrillan; CTH-J in Hatfield; WIS 73 in Neillsville
- East end: US 10 / WIS 73 in Neillsville

Location
- Country: United States
- State: Wisconsin
- Counties: Buffalo, Trempealeau, Jackson, Clark

Highway system
- Wisconsin State Trunk Highway System; Interstate; US; State; Scenic; Rustic
← WIS 94	→ WIS 96

State Trunk Highway 95 (often called Highway 95, STH-95 or WIS 95) is a 73.76-mile (118.71 km) state highway in the west-central area of the US state of Wisconsin that runs east–west from near Neillsville to Fountain City.

== Route description ==
WIS 95 starts in Neillsville with U.S. Highway 10 (US 10) going east–west and WIS 73, with which WIS 95 runs concurrently for three miles (4.8 km) going north–south. (WIS 73 goes on US 10 for one block). After that, WIS 95 leaves WIS 73 and starts going east–west toward Merrillan. WIS 95 also goes through Alma Center, Hixton, and Blair before going north–south on US 53 for 1.6 miles (2.6 km). It then turns off to go east–west toward Arcadia. WIS 95 then goes east–west then north–south for 9.6 miles (15.4 km) then goes back going east–west toward Fountain City where WIS 95 ends.

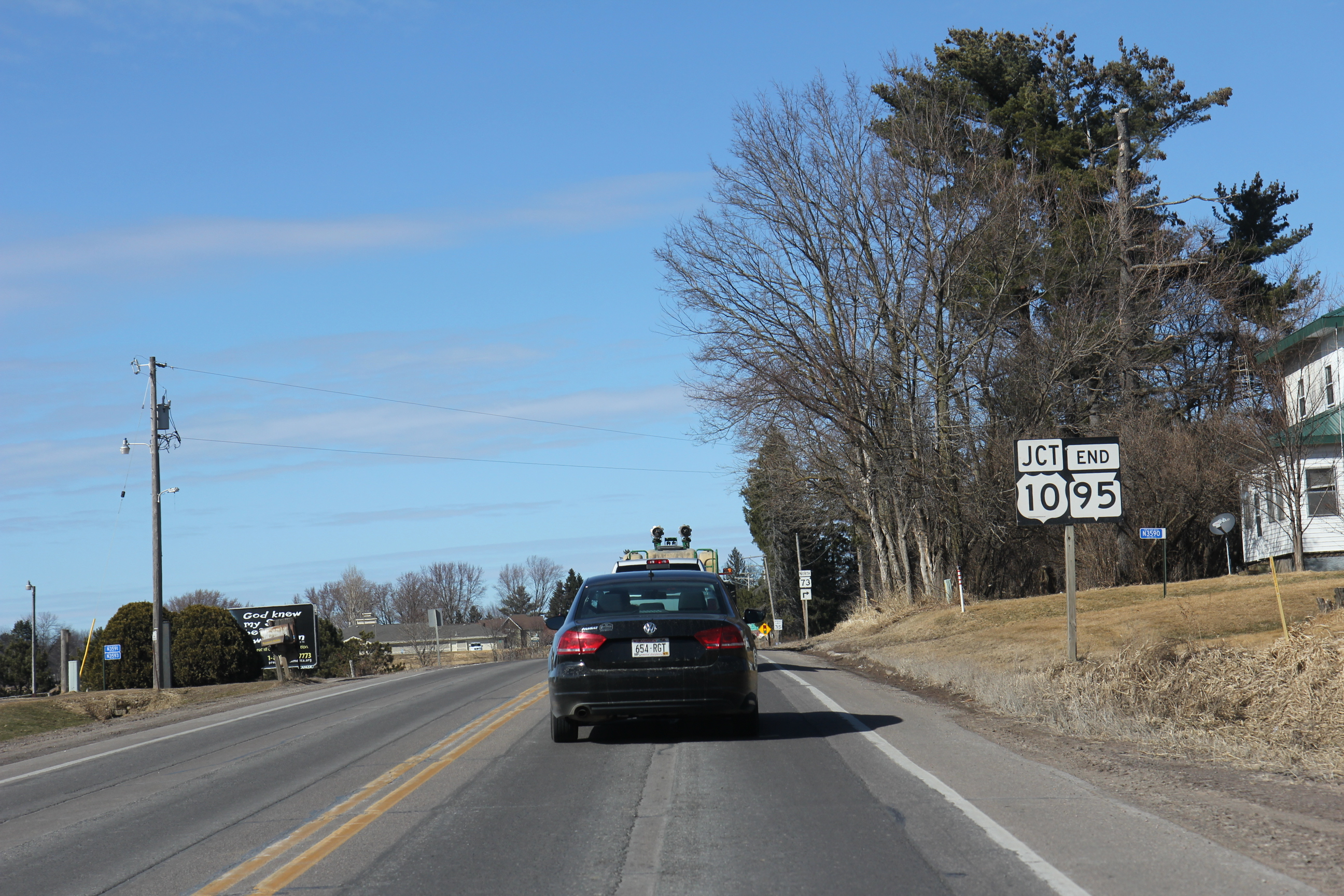
Northern terminus in Neillsville

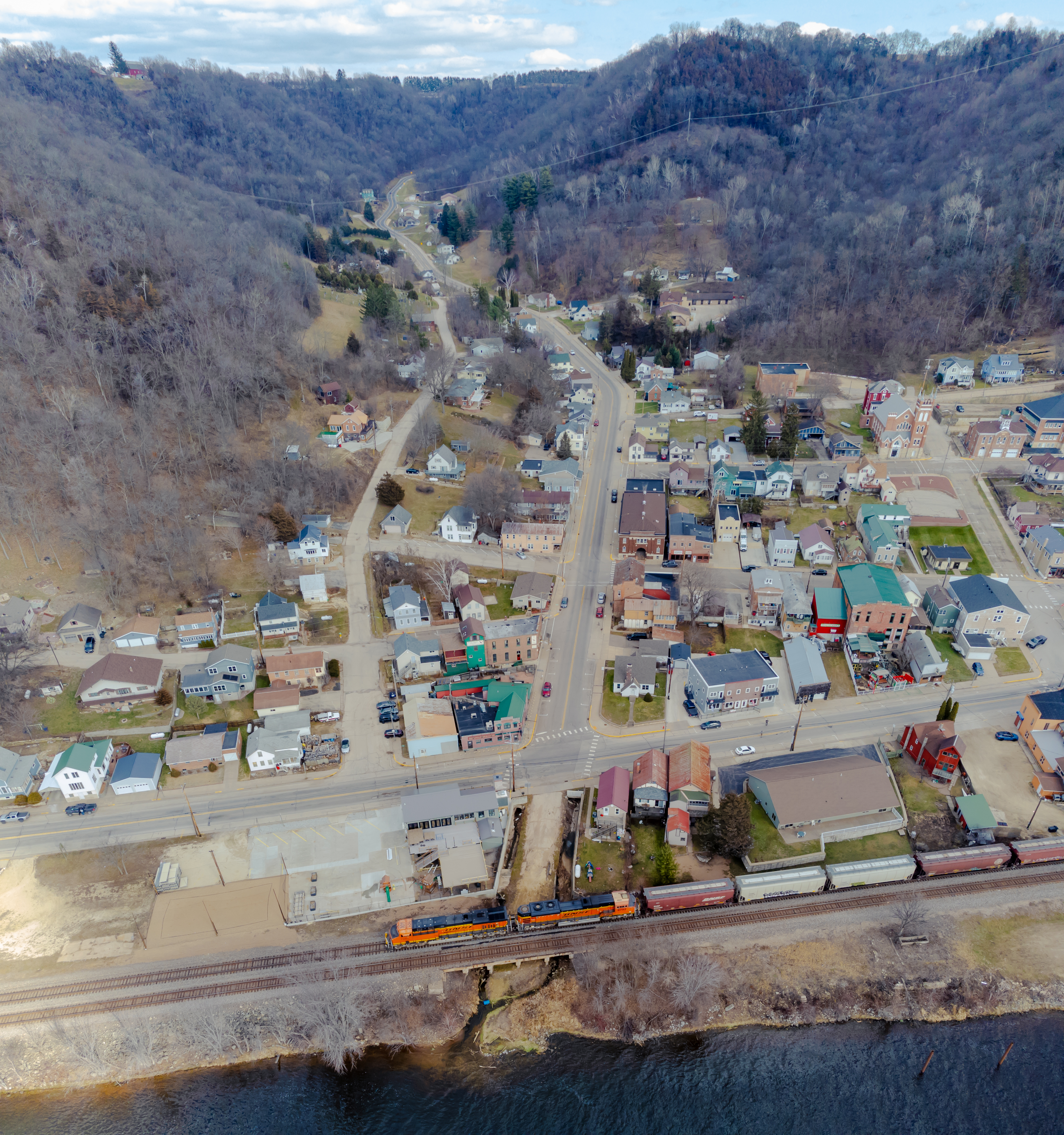
Southern terminus in Fountain City

== History ==
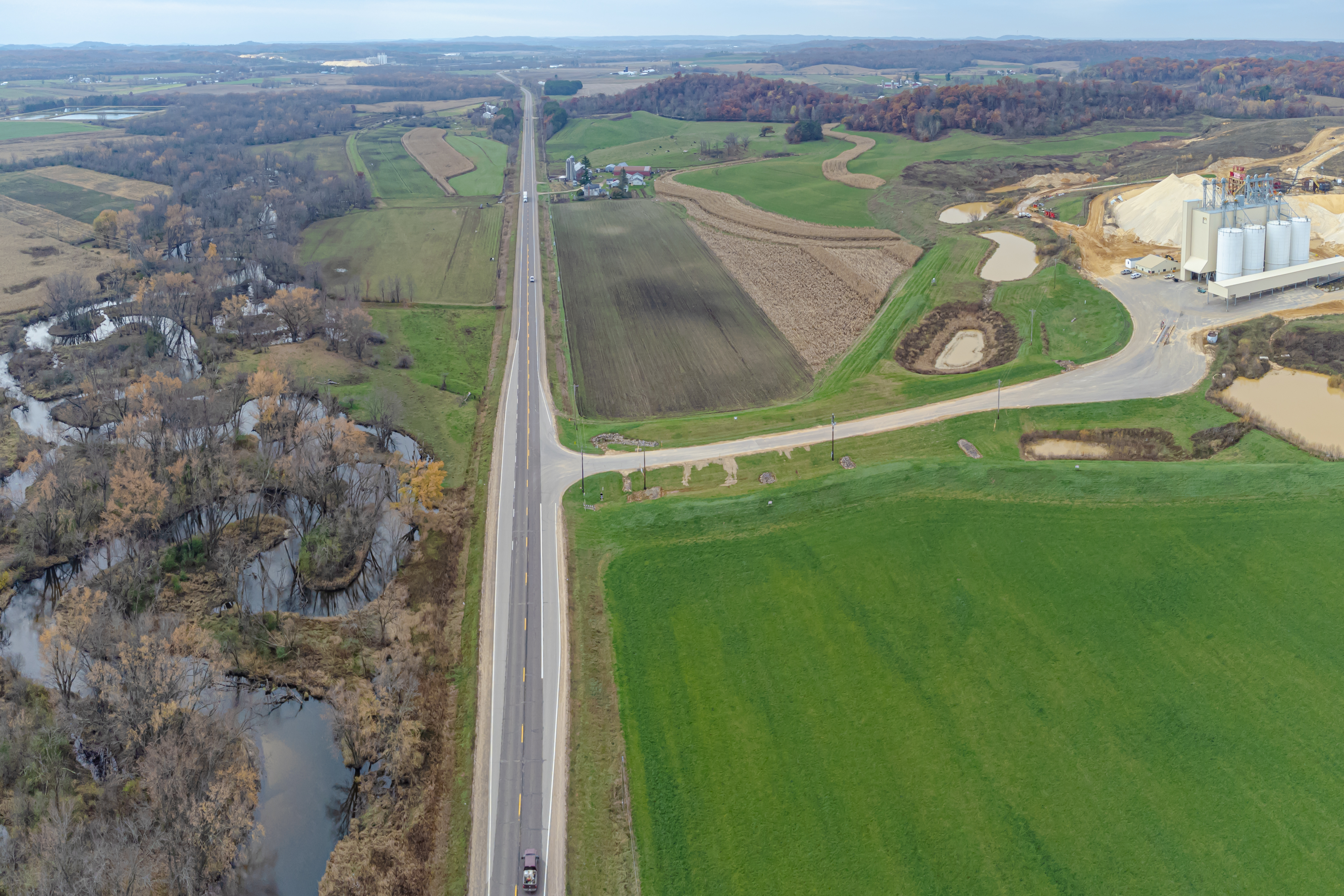
WIS 95 by Taylor frac sand mine

Initially, WIS 95 traveled from WIS 15 (later US 41; now US 45) in Oshkosh to WIS 18 (later US 10; now WIS 96/WIS 110) in Fremont via parts of present-day US 45, CTH-S, CTH-M, CTH-II, and WIS 110. Prior to 1926, no significant changes to the routing happened. Then, in 1926, WIS 95 moved off from the Oshkosh–Fremont route to the Fountain City–Neillsville route. The Fountain City–Neillsville route was previously signed as WIS 53 before 1926. This was done in favor of establishing two U.S. Highways: US 53 (which caused WIS 53 to be decommissioned due to its route number being duplicated) and US 110 (which filled in the pre-1926 alignment of WIS 95). The routing still remains like this to this day.

== Major intersections ==
County	Location	mi	km	Destinations	Notes
Buffalo	Fountain City	0.00	0.00	WIS 35 / Great River Road – Trempealeau, Cochrane	
Trempealeau	Arcadia			WIS 93 – Independence, Galesville	
Trempealeau	Town of Preston			US 53 north – Whitehall	Northern end of US 53 overlap
Trempealeau	Blair			US 53 south – Ettrick	Southern end of US 53 overlap
Jackson	Hixton			I-94 – Eau Claire, Madison	
Jackson	Town of Garden Valley			WIS 121 west – Northfield	
Jackson	Merrillan			US 12 / WIS 27 – Black River Falls, Fairchild	
Clark	Town of Pine Valley			WIS 73 south – Wisconsin Rapids	Southern end of WIS 73 overlap
Clark	Neillsville			US 10 / WIS 73 north – Fairchild, Greenwood, Marshfield	Northern end of WIS 73 overlap
1.000 mi = 1.609 km; 1.000 km = 0.621 mi: Concurrency terminus
