= Dover, Wisconsin =

Dover is the name of some places in the U.S. state of Wisconsin:

- Dover, Price County, Wisconsin, an unincorporated community
- Dover, Buffalo County, Wisconsin, a town
- Dover, Racine County, Wisconsin, a town
