= York, Jackson County, Wisconsin =

York, Wisconsin
- Unincorporated community
- Location within Wisconsin Location within the United States
- Coordinates: 44°27′00″N 91°08′43″W
- Country: United States
- State: Wisconsin
- County: Jackson
- Town: Northfield
- Elevation: 896 ft (273 m)
- Time zone: UTC-6 (Central (CST))
  - Summer (DST): UTC-5 (CDT)
- Postal code: Postal code 54758
- Area codes: 715 & 534
- GNIS feature ID: 1577103

York is an unincorporated community in the town of Northfield, Jackson County, Wisconsin, United States. It is along County Highway G, 3.5 miles (5.6 km) east-northeast of Pigeon Falls.

== Overview ==
York is primarily known for its annual rodeo held every second weekend of August. It has a park and a bar, but no stores or gas stations. It is designated by Zip Code 54758.

== Geography ==
York is in Jackson County, at latitude 44.5 and longitude −91.145 and at an elevation of 896 feet. It appears on the Pigeon Falls U.S Geological Survey Map and is in the Central Time Zone.

== York Schools ==
York's first schoolhouse was built in 1926 on the corner of Highways 121 and G. In 1936, the brick schoolhouse burned to the ground. It was replaced the following year, and a sign recovered from the fire was hung above the new school's windows. Theodore Hanson taught at the school from 1949 to 1965 until the redistricting and consolidation of schools lead to its closure. The old schoolhouse was then used as a community center until 1990, when it was sold and converted to a private home.

== Ormand Kinning Memorial Park ==
York's park, Ormond Kinning Memorial Park, is owned by the York-Northfield Recreation Club, Inc. and the Rod and Gun Club. The York Creamery originally owned the land, which contained an old baseball field. In 1962, the Creamery needed to replace its sewage system, and told community members they could have more of the land. Ormond “Shot” Kinning and other local residents then renovated the ball field to its present state. In addition to the baseball field, the park has playground equipment, two stands/sheds, and areas for the rodeo and gymkhana.

The annual York Rodeo is held at the park. It has been the site of baby showers, reunions, graduation parties, wedding, picnics, and other events.

This park was named after Ormond “Shot” Kinning, following his death in a farming accident. The sign at its entrance was erected during the 1968 rodeo.

== York Rodeo ==
The annual York Rodeo is held at Ormand Kinning Memorial Park on the second weekend of August. First held in 1963, it was the idea of York resident Ormond Kinning. Beer and food were originally sold there from tents. When a tornado destroyed the Kinnings's barn, the first food stand was built with lumber salvaged from the barn. This was used until 1972, when committee members decided to replace it with a new one, which was later reinforced with steel sides and used as a shelter.

Rodeo weekend includes many activities. On Saturday, a coed softball tournament begins, with its championship game held Sunday. On Saturday afternoon, there is an antique tractor ride from the schoolhouse to the park, followed by the Gymkhana, then a lip-sync singing contest. Saturday evening finishes with a dance, with music provided by a local band.

Sunday begins with a grand parade in the morning, from the schoolhouse to the park. It is followed by games for kids and adults, including bingo and a dunk tank. The rodeo then begins, with sheep and steer riding, egg tosses, sack races, chicken- and pig-catching, and a coin find. There is also a horseshoe tournament open to everyone. The weekend concludes with a raffle for $1,000 and fireworks.

== The York Bar ==
The York Bar was built in the early 1900s by Theodore Larson. It was originally the York Grocery Store, which owners Tom and Bernice Larson bought from Emil Neprud in November, 1935. The Larsons obtained their first beer license in July, 1936. A kitchen, added to the building's south side in 1943, sold donuts, cakes and lunches to workers and town visitors. Until the 1950s, patrons used an outhouse behind the building. Indoor bathrooms and bar room were added in the 1950s. The York Grocery Store tried to provide a little bit of everything, including work gloves, women's stockings, school supplies, notions, cigarettes and snuff, fresh eggs, a meat counter, groceries, and ice cream.

In the 1960s, larger grocery stores opened in the area, drawing shoppers away from York. This motivated the Larsons to obtain a liquor license in 1967, which increased their business significantly.
