= Frederick Condit =

American politician

Frederick T. Condit (March 27, 1852 – January 1933) was an American lawyer from Merrillan, Wisconsin who served one term as an Independent Greenback member of the Wisconsin State Assembly from Jackson County.

== Background ==
Condit was born in the village of Dresden, Yates County, New York, on March 27, 1852; he came to Wisconsin with his family in 1857, and they settled at Sparta. Condit received a common school education, and became a lawyer. He moved to Merrillan in Jackson County in 1877.

== Public office ==
In 1877 he ran as a Democrat for district attorney, but lost. He was elected as an "Independent Greenback" in 1878 with 833 votes to 811 for Republican J. R. Sechler (Republican incumbent Carl C. Pope was not a candidate for re-election). He was appointed to the standing committees on federal relations and on privileges and elections; and to the joint committee on claims.

In 1879 he ran as a Democrat for the State Senate's 32nd District (Jackson and Monroe counties), losing to William T. Price, with 3,425 votes to Price's 4,395. He was succeeded in the Assembly by Republican Robert D. Wilson.

== Outside the Assembly ==
Condit married Elsie Woodley on January 13, 1879. Sometime after leaving the legislature, he moved to Hudson in St. Croix County, where he became the Mayor of Hudson and was editor and manager of the Hudson Star-Observer. He died in Hudson.
