= Lookout, Wisconsin =

- Unincorporated community
- Location within Wisconsin Location within the United States
- Coordinates: 44°27′30″N 91°34′46″W
- Country: United States
- State: Wisconsin
- County: Buffalo
- Town: Dover
- Elevation: 866 ft (264 m)
- Time zone: UTC-6 (Central (CST))
  - Summer (DST): UTC-5 (CDT)
- Area codes: 715 & 534
- GNIS feature ID: 1568613

Lookout is an unincorporated community located in the town of Dover, in Buffalo County, Wisconsin, United States. Lookout is located on Wisconsin Highway 121, 9 miles (14 km) southeast of Mondovi.
