= William F. Dettinger =

American farmer and politician

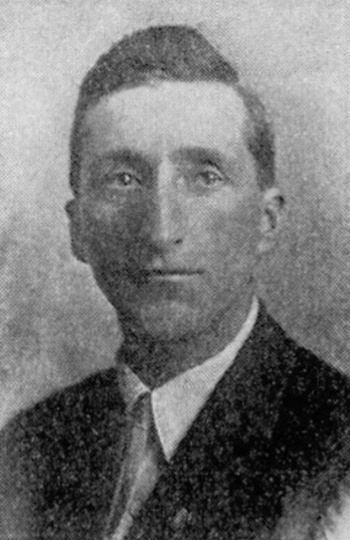

Member of the Wisconsin State Assembly
- In office 1919–1927, 1931–1935

Personal details
- Born: September 24, 1880 Northfield, Wisconsin, US
- Died: July 3, 1952 (aged 71) Blooming Grove, Wisconsin, US
- Party: Republican; Progressive
- Education: University of Wisconsin
- Occupation: Farmer, politician

William F. Dettinger (September 24, 1880 – July 3, 1952) was an American farmer and politician.

== Biography ==
Born in the town of Northfield, Jackson County, Wisconsin, Dettinger took the short agricultural course at University of Wisconsin. He was a farmer and livestock dealer in the town of Northfield. Dettinger worked for the Armour Packing Company for five years. He was president of the York Creamery Association. Dettinger served on the Northfield Town Board and was chairman of the town board. He was the Jackson County health officer. From 1919 to 1927 and from 1931 to 1935, Dettinger served in the Wisconsin State Assembly and was a Republican and a Progressive. In 1940, Dettinger moved to the town of Blooming Grove, Dane County, Wisconsin. Dettinger served as chairman of the Blooming Grove Town Board and on the Dane County Board of Supervisors. Dettinger died suddenly at his home in Blooming Grove.
