= Wisconsin Highway 93 =

Highway in Wisconsin

State Trunk Highway 93
- WIS 93 highlighted in red

Route information
- Maintained by WisDOT
- Length: 68.00 mi (109.44 km)

Major junctions
- South end: US 53 / WIS 35 in Holmen
- US 53 / WIS 54 in Galesville; US 10 in Eleva; I-94 in Eau Claire
- North end: US 53 in Eau Claire

Location
- Country: United States
- State: Wisconsin
- Counties: La Crosse, Trempealeau, Eau Claire

Highway system
- Wisconsin State Trunk Highway System; Interstate; US; State; Scenic; Rustic
| ← WIS 92 | → I-94 |

State Trunk Highway 93 (often called Highway 93, STH-93 or WIS 93) is a state highway in the U.S. state of Wisconsin. It runs north–south in west-central Wisconsin from near Holmen to Eau Claire.

== Route description ==
WIS 93 begins three miles (4.8 km) north of Holmen at the intersection of WIS 35 and US Highway 53 (US 53). The first nine miles (14 km) of roadway runs concurrently with US 53. The route runs concurrently with WIS 54 for the next six miles (9.7 km) until it reaches the intersection with WIS 35 in Centerville.

== History ==
Starting in 1919, WIS 93 was formed to follow along part of its present-day route from WIS 25 (now WIS 35/WIS 54) in Centerville to WIS 53 (now WIS 95 and County Trunk Highway A [CTH-A]) west of Arcadia. In 1923, part of WIS 53 was moved south and extended northeastward, running from Arcadia to Neville instead of to Whitehall. As a result, WIS 93 extended northward to Eau Claire, superseding portions of WIS 53 from Arcadia to Independence and WIS 88 from Independence to Elk Creek. In 1934, WIS 93 extended southward towards Trempealeau and then eastward along superseded WIS 167 towards US 53/WIS 35 near Holmen.

In 1940, WIS 93 moved off from what is now McGilvray "Seven Bridges" Road (later signed as CTH-M/CTH-XA). As a result, it has to travel northward roughly along present-day and former CTH-M towards WIS 35 (now WIS 93)/WIS 54 west of Galesville. In 1953, a connection to US 53 near Holman was restored.

In the mid-1980s, WIS 93 moved eastward to bypass Arcadia, swapping with CTH-A in the process. In 1990, a portion of WIS 93 switched places with a portion of WIS 35. As a result, WIS 93 served Galesville while WIS 35 served Trempealeau.

== Major intersections ==
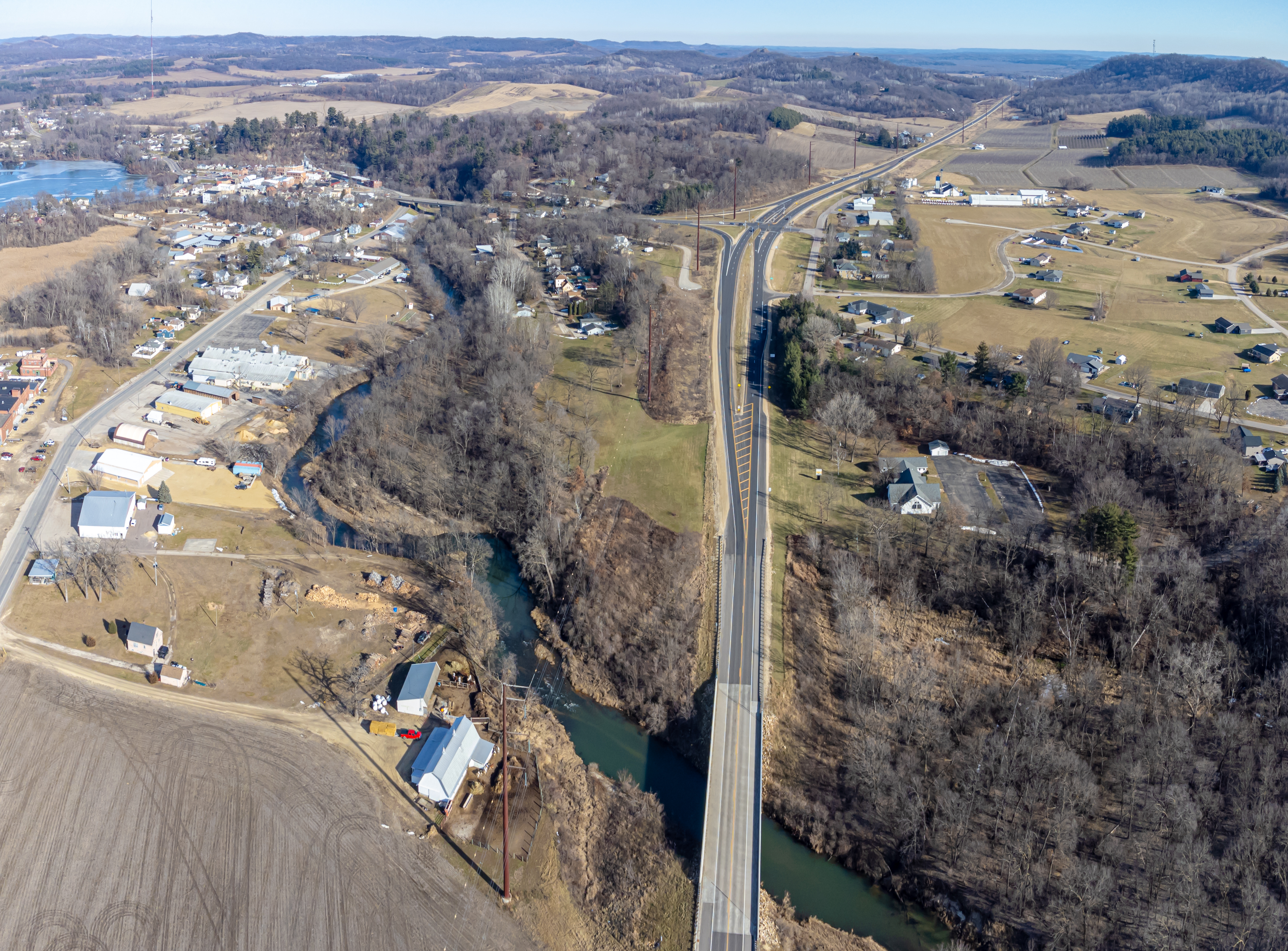
Wisconsin State Highway 54 & 93. US-53 splits off north through Galesville

| County | Location | mi | km | Destinations | Notes |
|---|---|---|---|---|---|
| La Crosse | Holmen | | | US 53 south / WIS 35 south – Onalaska WIS 35 north / Bus. WIS 35 / Great River Road / CTH-HD – Holmen, Trempealeau | Southern end of US 53 concurency; roadway continues as southbound US 53/WIS 35 |
| Trempealeau | Town of Gale | | | WIS 54 east – Melrose | Eastern end of WIS 54 concurrency |
| Trempealeau | Galesville | | | US 53 north – Galesville, Ettrick | Northern end of US 53 concurrency |
| Trempealeau | Centerville | | | WIS 35 / Great River Road / WIS 54 west – Caledonia, Trempealeau | Western end of WIS 54 concurrency |
| Trempealeau | Arcadia | | | WIS 95 – Blair | |
| Trempealeau | Independence | | | WIS 121 east – Whitehall | Southern end of WIS 121 concurrency |
| Trempealeau | Town of Burnside | | | WIS 121 west – Gilmanton | Northern end of WIS 121 concurrency |
| Trempealeau | Eleva | | | US 10 – Mondovi, Strum | |
| Eau Claire | Eau Claire | | | I-94 – St. Paul, Madison | |
| Eau Claire | Eau Claire | | | US 53 north to US 12 (Clairemont Avenue) Bus. US 53 north (Hastings Way) / US 53 south to I-94 – Madison | |
1.000 mi = 1.609 km; 1.000 km = 0.621 mi: Concurrency terminus
