= Northfield, Wisconsin =

- Town
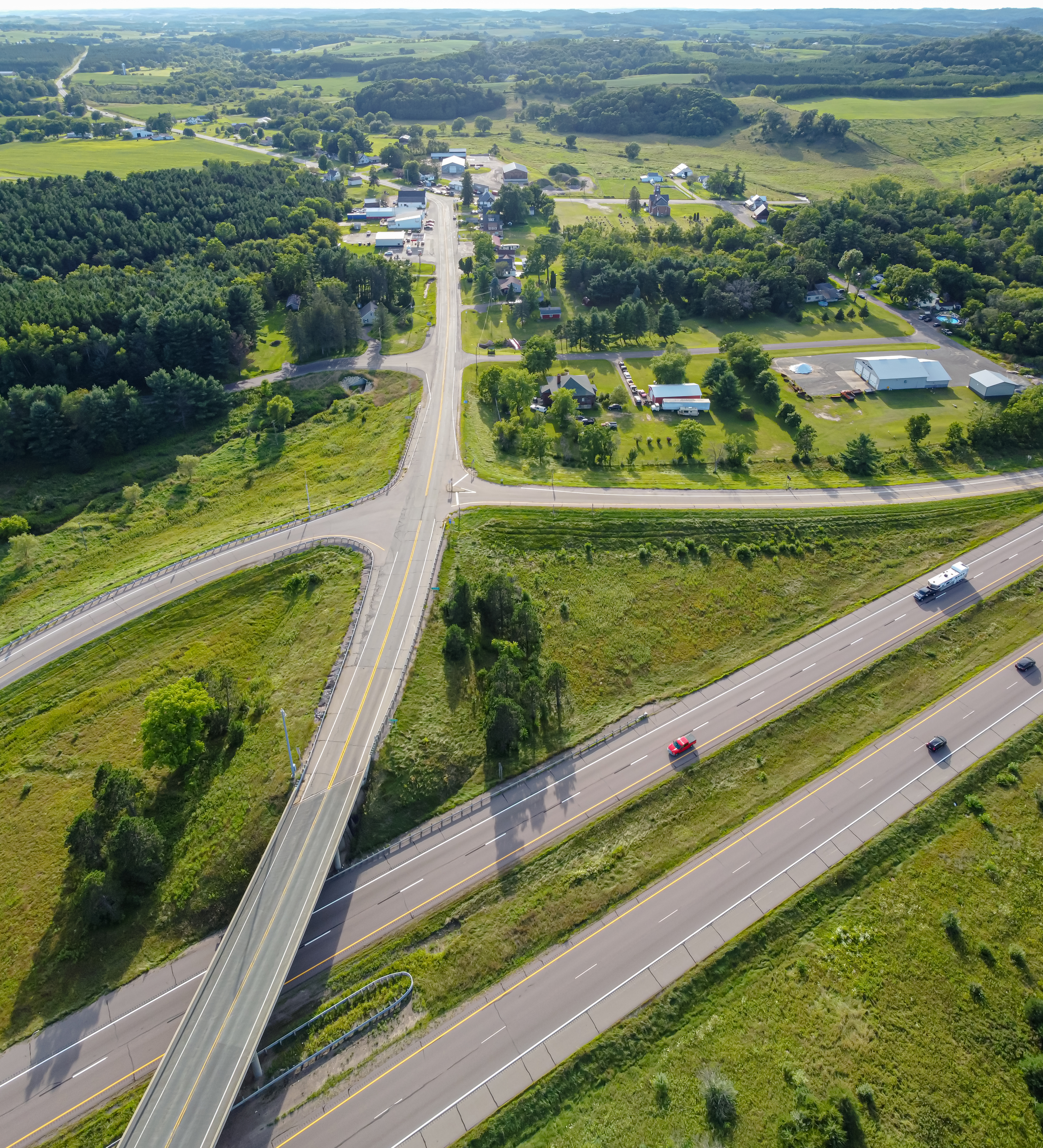
- I-94 in the foreground

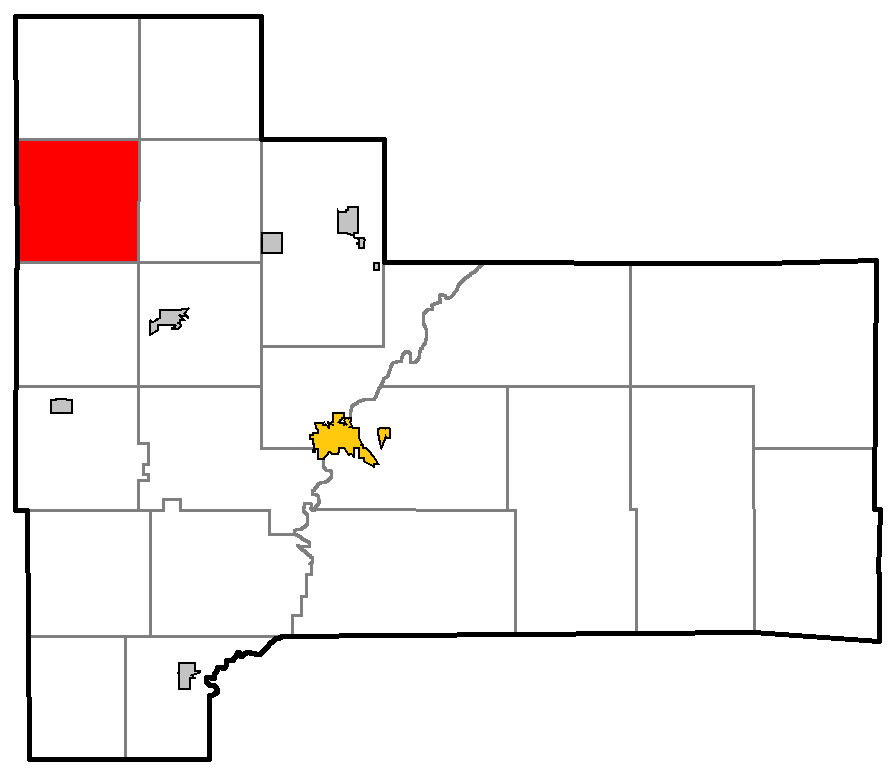
- Location of Northfield, Jackson County

- Location of Jackson County, Wisconsin
- Coordinates: 44°27′35″N 91°6′7″W
- Country: United States
- State: Wisconsin
- County: Jackson

Area
  - Total: 36.0 sq mi (93.2 km^{2})
  - Land: 35.9 sq mi (93.1 km^{2})
  - Water: 0.039 sq mi (0.1 km^{2})
- Elevation: 1,060 ft (323 m)

Population (2020)
  - Total: 674
  - Density: 18.8/sq mi (7.24/km^{2})
- Time zone: UTC-6 (Central (CST))
  - Summer (DST): UTC-5 (CDT)
- Area codes: 715 & 534
- FIPS code: 55-57975
- GNIS feature ID: 1583826

Northfield is a town in Jackson County, Wisconsin, United States. The population was 674 at the 2020 census. The unincorporated communities of Northfield and York are located in the town.

== History ==
The first immigrant settlers came to the Northfield area in the 1850s. The town was created in November 1857 out of the northwestern portion of the town of Brooklyn. Sixteen families were listed in the town by the 1860 census. Garfield was created out of the northern portion of Northfield in 1881.

== Geography ==
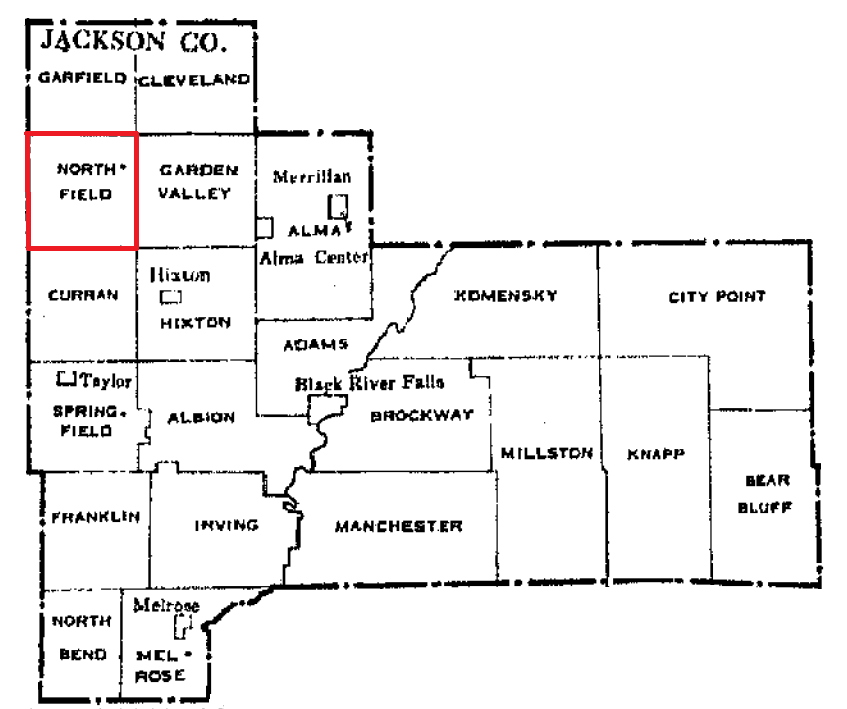
Location of Northfield highlighted in red on map of Jackson County towns

According to the United States Census Bureau, the town has a total area of 36.0 square miles (93.2 km^{2}), of which 36.0 square miles (93.1 km^{2}) is land and 0.04 square mile (0.1 km^{2}) (0.11%) is water.

Interstate 94 bisects the town, roughly running from the northwestern corner of the town to the southeastern corner, with an exit located at Wisconsin Highway 121 near the community of Northfield.

== Demographics ==
As of the census of 2000, there were 586 people, 224 households, and 180 families residing in the town. The population density was 16.3 people per square mile (6.3/km^{2}). There were 261 housing units at an average density of 7.3 per square mile (2.8/km^{2}). The racial makeup of the town was 98.81% White, 0.17% Native American, 0.34% Asian, 0.17% from other races, and 0.51% from two or more races. Hispanic or Latino of any race were 0.51% of the population.

There were 224 households, out of which 25.9% had children under the age of 18 living with them, 70.1% were married couples living together, 5.4% had a female householder with no husband present, and 19.2% were non-families. 17.0% of all households were made up of individuals, and 8.5% had someone living alone who was 65 years of age or older. The average household size was 2.42 and the average family size was 2.70.

In the town, the population was spread out, with 18.8% under the age of 18, 6.5% from 18 to 24, 24.2% from 25 to 44, 30.2% from 45 to 64, and 20.3% who were 65 years of age or older. The median age was 45 years. For every 100 females, there were 117.0 males. For every 100 females age 18 and over, there were 124.5 males.

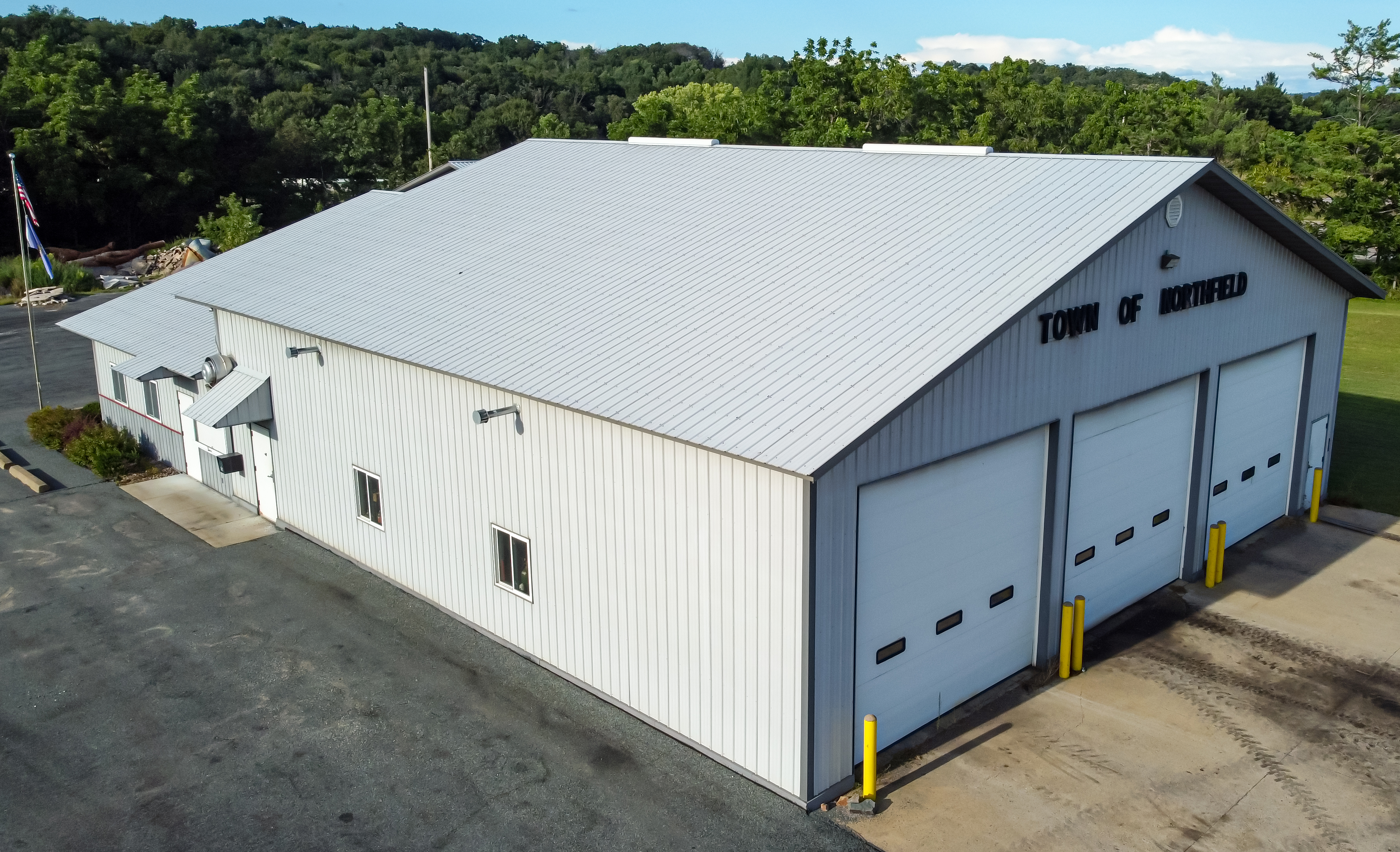
Northfield Town Hall

The median income for a household in the town was $35,250, and the median income for a family was $41,042. Males had a median income of $26,875 versus $20,000 for females. The per capita income for the town was $15,356. About 9.0% of families and 10.0% of the population were below the poverty line, including 5.2% of those under age 18 and 22.9% of those age 65 or over.

== Notable people ==
- William F. Dettinger, Wisconsin State Representative and farmer, was born in the town; Dettinger served as Northfield Town Board chairman
