= Pigeon Falls, Wisconsin =

- Village
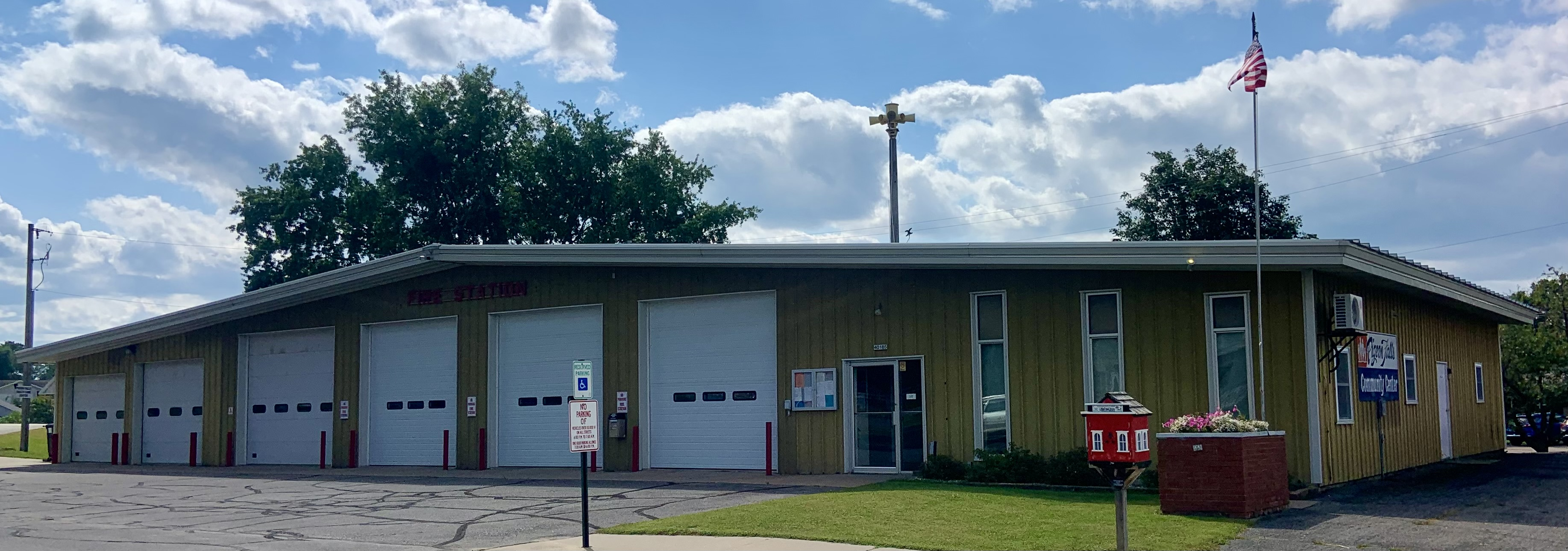
- Village hall

- Location of Pigeon Falls in Trempealeau County, Wisconsin.
- Coordinates: 44°25′N 91°13′W
- Country: United States
- State: Wisconsin
- County: Trempealeau

Area
  - Total: 0.43 sq mi (1.12 km^{2})
  - Land: 0.43 sq mi (1.12 km^{2})
  - Water: 0 sq mi (0.00 km^{2})
- Elevation: 866 ft (264 m)

Population (2020)
  - Total: 381
  - Density: 881/sq mi (340/km^{2})
- Time zone: UTC-6 (Central (CST))
  - Summer (DST): UTC-5 (CDT)
- Area codes: 715 & 534
- FIPS code: 55-62675
- GNIS feature ID: 1571367

Pigeon Falls is a village in Trempealeau County, Wisconsin, United States. The population was 381 at the 2020 census.

== Geography ==
Pigeon Falls is located at 44°25′N 91°13′W (44.4237, -91.2098).

According to the United States Census Bureau, the village has a total area of 0.48 square miles (1.24 km^{2}), all land.

Pigeon Falls is located at a falls of Pigeon Creek, a tributary of the Trempealeau River.

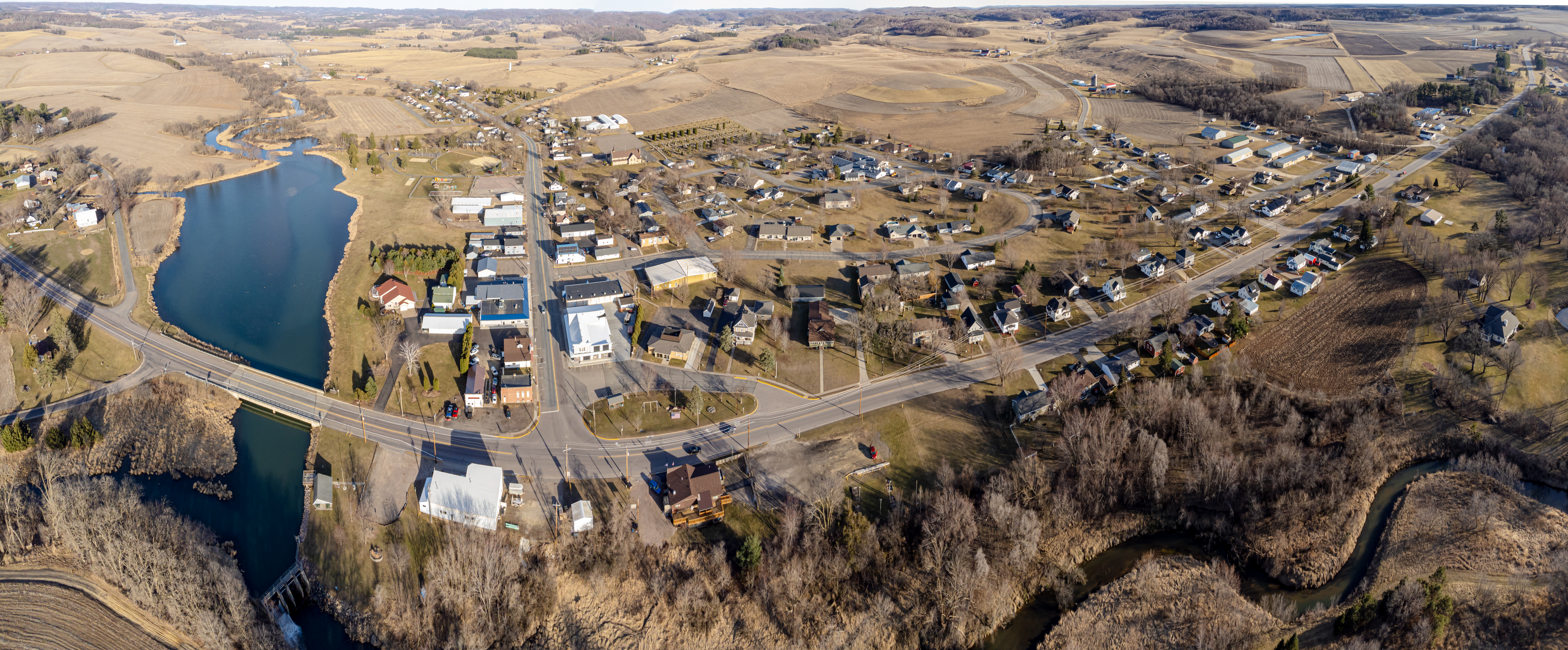
US-53 and Wis-121 junction in town

== Demographics ==
Historical population
Census	Pop.	Note	%±
1960	207		—
1970	198		−4.3%
1980	338		70.7%
1990	289		−14.5%
2000	388		34.3%
2010	411		5.9%
2020	381		−7.3%
U.S. Decennial Census

=== 2010 census ===
As of the census of 2010, there were 411 people, 172 households, and 102 families living in the village. The population density was 856.3 inhabitants per square mile (330.6/km^{2}). There were 188 housing units at an average density of 391.7 per square mile (151.2/km^{2}). The racial makeup of the village was 99.3% White, 0.2% African American, 0.2% Asian, and 0.2% from two or more races. Hispanic or Latino of any race were 1.2% of the population.

There were 172 households, of which 20.3% had children under the age of 18 living with them, 50.0% were married couples living together, 7.0% had a female householder with no husband present, 2.3% had a male householder with no wife present, and 40.7% were non-families. 32.6% of all households were made up of individuals, and 20.3% had someone living alone who was 65 years of age or older. The average household size was 2.17 and the average family size was 2.75.

The median age in the village was 52.1 years. 17% of residents were under the age of 18; 5% were between the ages of 18 and 24; 20.2% were from 25 to 44; 26.3% were from 45 to 64; and 31.6% were 65 years of age or older. The gender makeup of the village was 45.5% male and 54.5% female.

=== 2000 census ===
As of the census of 2000, there were 388 people, 139 households, and 86 families living in the village. The population density was 813.6 people per square mile (312.1/km^{2}). There were 144 housing units at an average density of 302.0 per square mile (115.8/km^{2}). The racial makeup of the village was 98.97% White, 0.77% African American and 0.26% Asian.

There were 139 households, out of which 24.5% had children under the age of 18 living with them, 55.4% were married couples living together, 3.6% had a female householder with no husband present, and 38.1% were non-families. 34.5% of all households were made up of individuals, and 29.5% had someone living alone who was 65 years of age or older. The average household size was 2.28 and the average family size was 2.95.

In the village, the population was spread out, with 18.8% under the age of 18, 4.9% from 18 to 24, 17.8% from 25 to 44, 20.4% from 45 to 64, and 38.1% who were 65 years of age or older. The median age was 52 years. For every 100 females, there were 86.5 males. For every 100 females age 18 and over, there were 86.4 males.

The median income for a household in the village was $34,107, and the median income for a family was $50,556. Males had a median income of $26,563 versus $20,859 for females. The per capita income for the village was $14,587. None of the families and 5.5% of the population were living below the poverty line, including no under eighteens and 13.4% of those over 64.

== Notable people ==
- Peder Ekern, Wisconsin State Representative, farmer, and businessman, lived in Pigeon Falls; Ekern served as chairman of the Pigeon Town Board.

== See also ==
- List of villages in Wisconsin
