= Merrillan, Wisconsin =

- Village
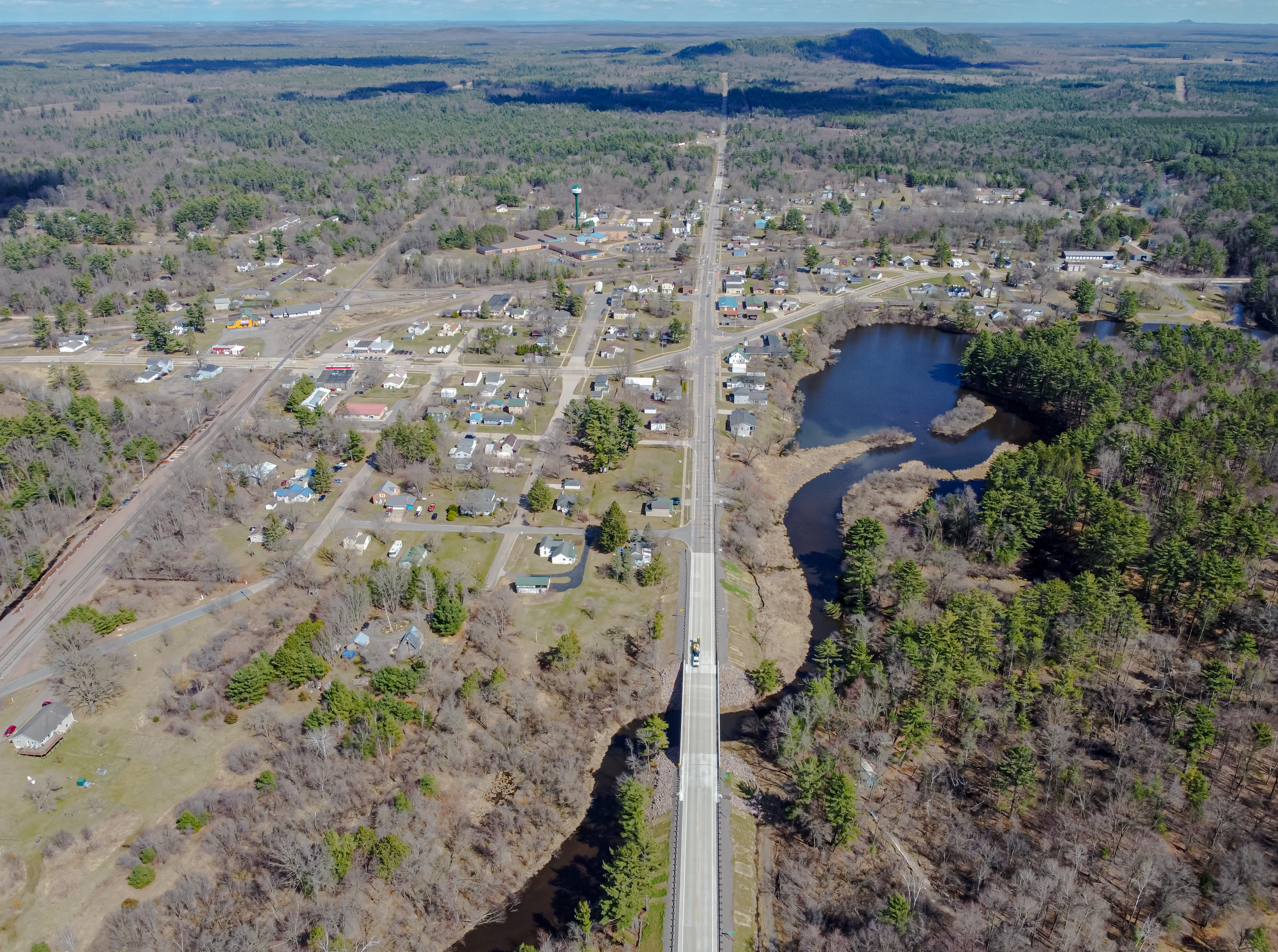
- Wis-95 and US-12 junction in Merrillan

- Location of Merrillan in Jackson County, Wisconsin.
- Coordinates: 44°26′58″N 90°50′15″W
- Country: United States
- State: Wisconsin
- County: Jackson

Area
  - Total: 1.42 sq mi (3.67 km^{2})
  - Land: 1.34 sq mi (3.48 km^{2})
  - Water: 0.073 sq mi (0.19 km^{2})
- Elevation: 932 ft (284 m)

Population (2020)
  - Total: 562
  - Density: 418/sq mi (161/km^{2})
- Time zone: UTC-6 (Central (CST))
  - Summer (DST): UTC-5 (CDT)
- Area codes: 715 & 534
- FIPS code: 55-51300
- GNIS feature ID: 1569372
- Website: https://merrillanwi.gov/

Merrillan is a village in Jackson County, Wisconsin, United States. The population was 562 at the 2020 census.

== History ==
A post office called Merrillan has been in operation since 1894. The village was named for L. G. Merrill, an original owner of the town site.

== Geography ==
Merrillan is located at 44°26′58″N 90°50′15″W (44.449528, -90.837386).

According to the United States Census Bureau, the village has a total area of 1.34 square miles (3.47 km^{2}), of which 1.26 square miles (3.26 km^{2}) is land and 0.08 square miles (0.21 km^{2}) is water.

== Demographics ==
Historical population
Census	Pop.	Note	%±
1880	1,003		—
1890	639		−36.3%
1900	739		15.6%
1910	625		−15.4%
1920	628		0.5%
1930	554		−11.8%
1940	591		6.7%
1950	579		−2.0%
1960	591		2.1%
1970	612		3.6%
1980	587		−4.1%
1990	553		−5.8%
2000	585		5.8%
2010	542		−7.4%
2020	562		3.7%
U.S. Decennial Census

=== 2010 census ===
As of the census of 2010, there were 542 people, 241 households, and 152 families residing in the village. The population density was 430.2 inhabitants per square mile (166.1/km^{2}). There were 318 housing units at an average density of 252.4 per square mile (97.5/km^{2}). The racial makeup of the village was 86.5% White, 2.6% Native American, 0.2% Asian, 0.4% Pacific Islander, 6.1% from other races, and 4.2% from two or more races. Hispanic or Latino of any race were 6.8% of the population.

There were 241 households, of which 27.4% had children under the age of 18 living with them, 39.4% were married couples living together, 14.1% had a female householder with no husband present, 9.5% had a male householder with no wife present, and 36.9% were non-families. 31.1% of all households were made up of individuals, and 15.7% had someone living alone who was 65 years of age or older. The average household size was 2.25 and the average family size was 2.70.

The median age in the village was 44.9 years. 21.4% of residents were under the age of 18; 8.7% were between the ages of 18 and 24; 20.2% were from 25 to 44; 29.6% were from 45 to 64; and 20.3% were 65 years of age or older. The gender makeup of the village was 48.2% male and 51.8% female.

=== 2000 census ===
As of the census of 2000, there were 585 people, 253 households, and 152 families residing in the village. The population density was 464.2 people per square mile (179.3/km^{2}). There were 289 housing units at an average density of 229.3 per square mile (88.6/km^{2}). The racial makeup of the village was 95.21% White, 0.68% African American, 2.74% Native American, 0.17% Asian, 0.68% from other races, and 0.51% from two or more races. Hispanic or Latino of any race were 0.68% of the population.

There were 253 households, out of which 26.9% had children under the age of 18 living with them, 45.1% were married couples living together, 10.7% had a female householder with no husband present, and 39.9% were non-families. 36.4% of all households were made up of individuals, and 17.0% had someone living alone who was 65 years of age or older. The average household size was 2.31 and the average family size was 2.97.

In the village, the population was spread out, with 23.1% under the age of 18, 8.2% from 18 to 24, 25.6% from 25 to 44, 26.2% from 45 to 64, and 16.9% who were 65 years of age or older. The median age was 39 years. For every 100 females, there were 100.3 males. For every 100 females age 18 and over, there were 92.3 males.

The median income for a household in the village was $28,917, and the median income for a family was $35,000. Males had a median income of $24,423 versus $19,250 for females. The per capita income for the village was $18,811. About 10.3% of families and 13.7% of the population were below the poverty line, including 34.4% of those under age 18 and 9.6% of those age 65 or over.

== Education ==
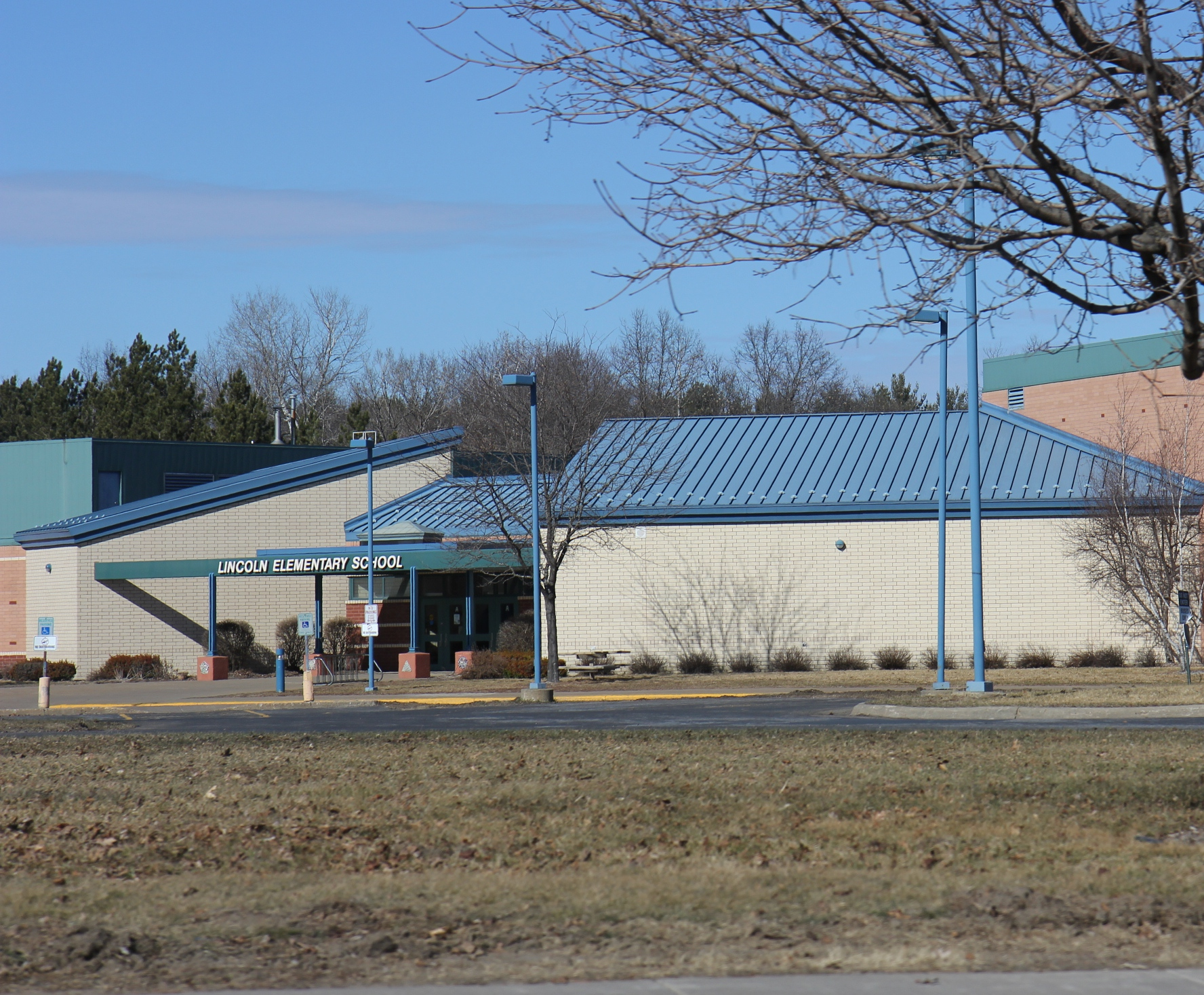
Lincoln Elementary School

School District of Alma Center-Humbird-Merrillan operates public schools.

Merrillan is home to Lincoln Elementary School, which serves students in four-year-old kindergarten through sixth grade. It is part of the Alma Center-Humbird-Merrillan (ACHM) school district and is located one-half mile from the junction of Highway 95 and Hwy 12 and 27. In 1996 the old school building was torn down and a new one erected just behind where the old one stood. Several years later a four-classroom addition was added. The building has a 4K-1st grade wing, a 2nd-4th grade wing, and a 5th-6th grade wing that includes a science room. In the center of the three wings in the Media Center. There is also a Lunda Commons where lunch is served, and which has a gymnasium with locker rooms. Flag football, basketball, softball, and baseball are available for elementary students to participate in.

== Notable people ==
- Mitchell Red Cloud, Jr. - Medal of Honor recipient
- Frederick Condit - lawyer and Independent Greenback legislator
- Alvin S. Trow - legislator

== Climate ==
The Köppen Climate Classification subtype for this climate is "Dfb" (Warm Summer Continental Climate).

Climate data for Merrillan, Wisconsin
Month	Jan	Feb	Mar	Apr	May	Jun	Jul	Aug	Sep	Oct	Nov	Dec	Year
Mean daily maximum °C (°F)	−4 (25)	−1 (30)	6 (42)	14 (58)	22 (71)	26 (79)	29 (84)	28 (82)	23 (73)	16 (61)	6 (43)	−2 (29)	14 (57)
Mean daily minimum °C (°F)	−17 (2)	−15 (5)	−8 (17)	−1 (31)	6 (42)	11 (52)	13 (56)	12 (54)	8 (46)	2 (35)	−5 (23)	−13 (9)	−1 (31)
Average precipitation cm (inches)	2.5 (1)	2.5 (1)	4.6 (1.8)	7.1 (2.8)	9.9 (3.9)	11 (4.4)	9.4 (3.7)	9.9 (3.9)	9.7 (3.8)	5.8 (2.3)	4.6 (1.8)	3.0 (1.2)	80 (31.4)
Average precipitation days	7	5	7	9	10	10	9	9	9	8	7	6	96
Source: Weatherbase

== Starlink ==
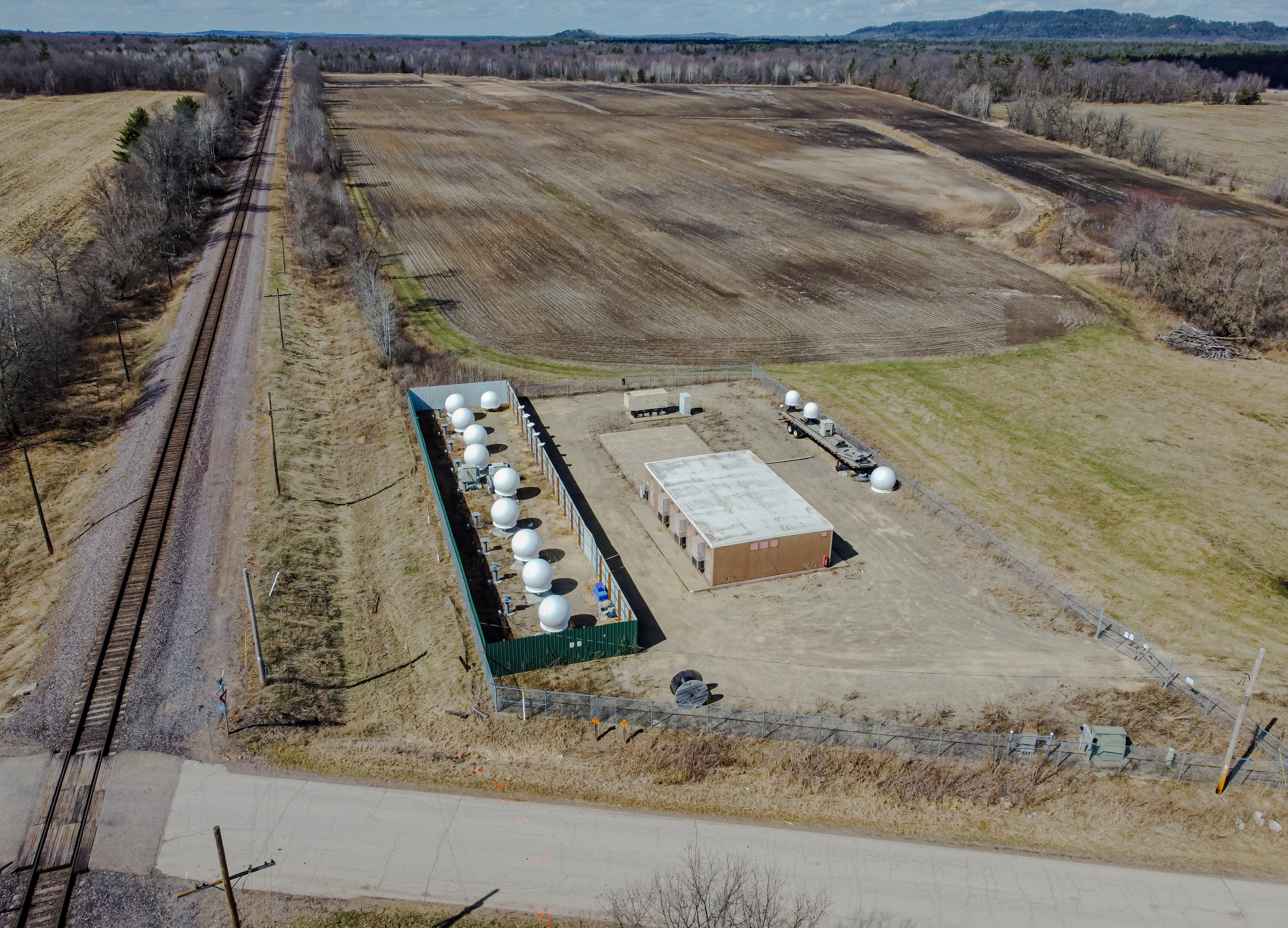
Fiberoptic site for Starlink near Merrillan

Space Exploration Technologies Corp. (SpaceX) has submitted applications to the FCC for Ka-band and Ku-band ground stations to be hosted in Merrillan. The Ku-band application was filed March 28, 2019, while the Ka-band application was filed September 5, 2019. According to the applications, the station will be located at W10022 Garage Road, Merrillan, WI 54754, at the existing interstate fiber optic cable site.

== Images ==
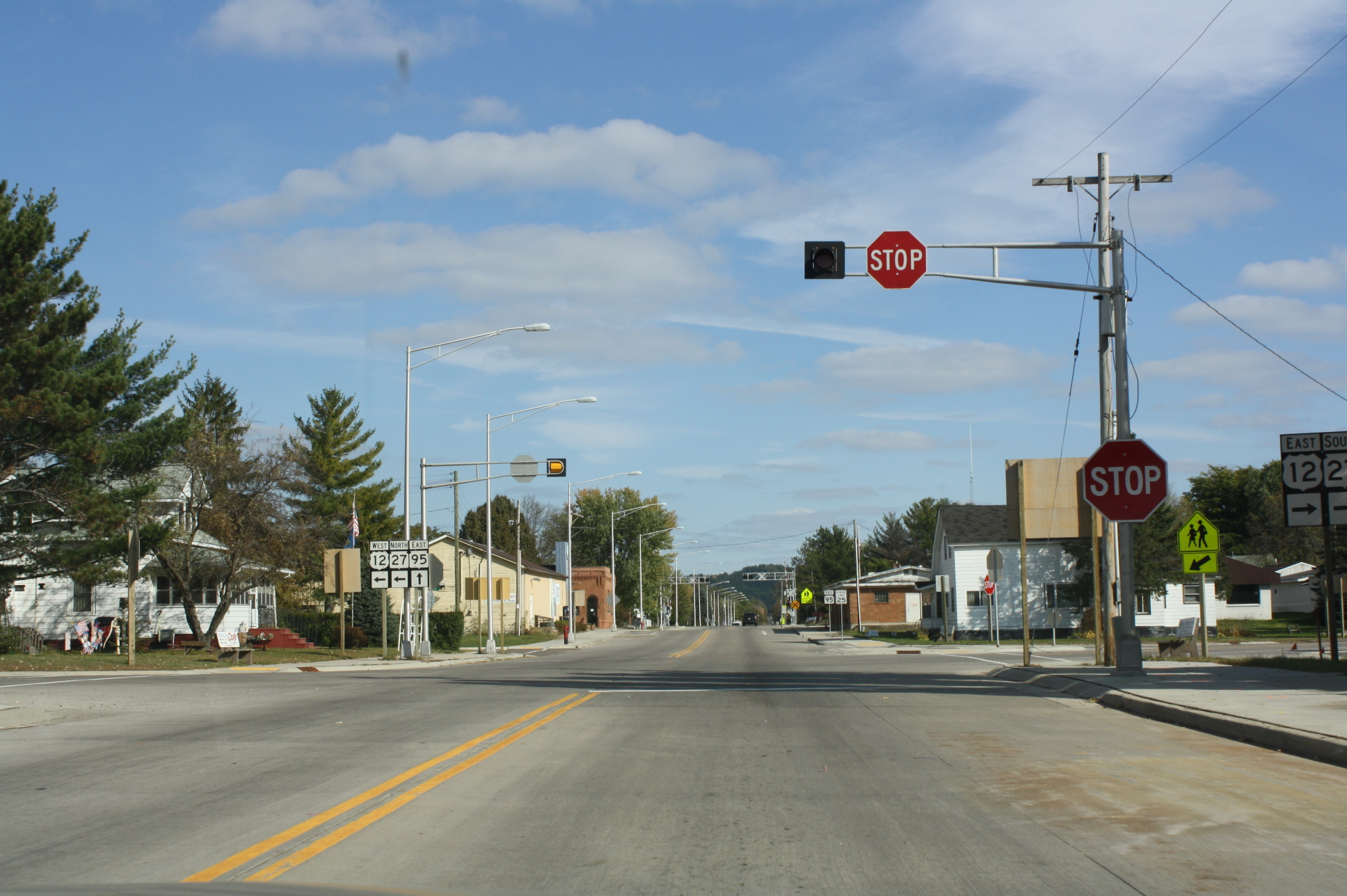
Intersection of WIS 95 with WIS 27 / US 12

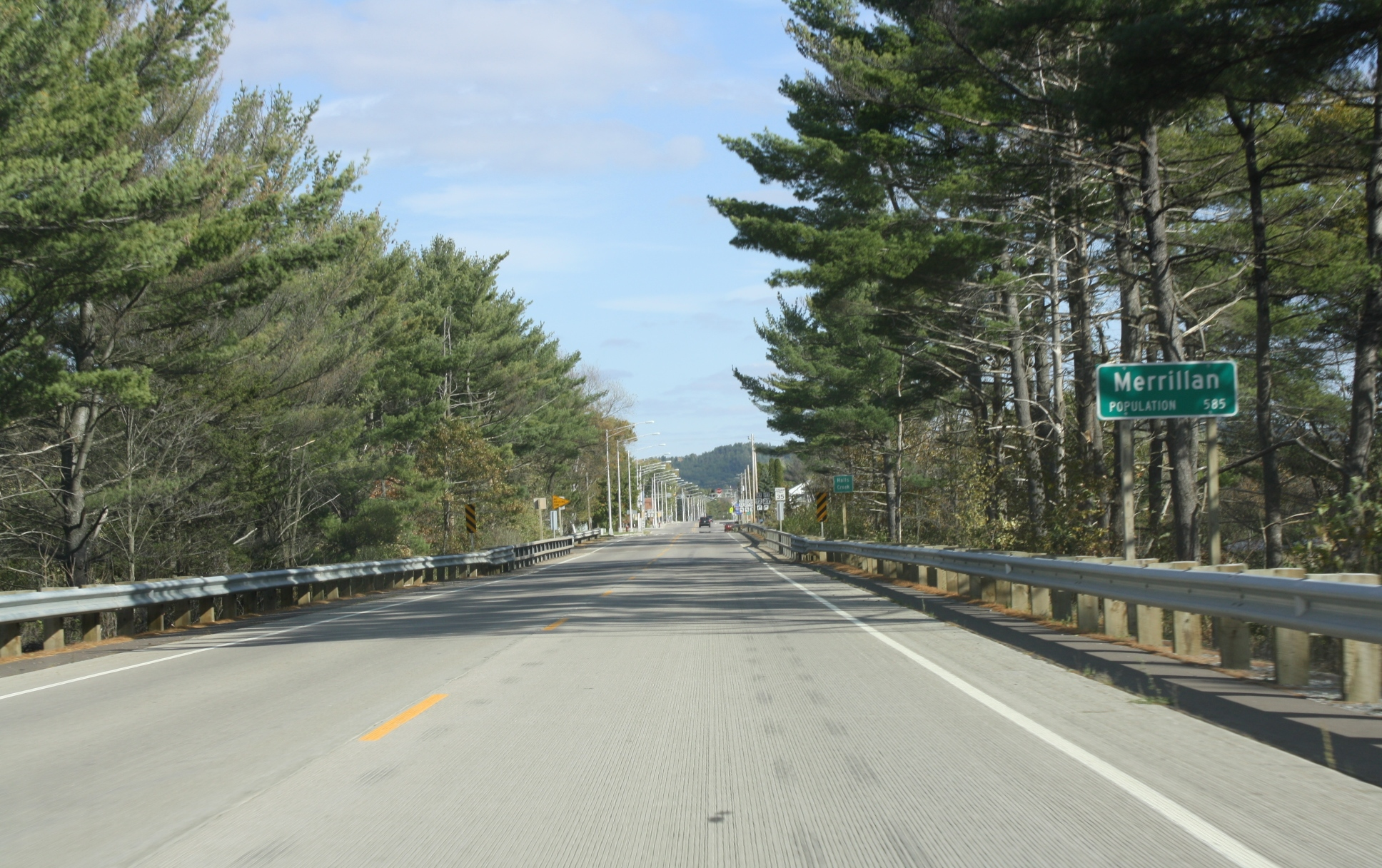
Sign marking Merrillan

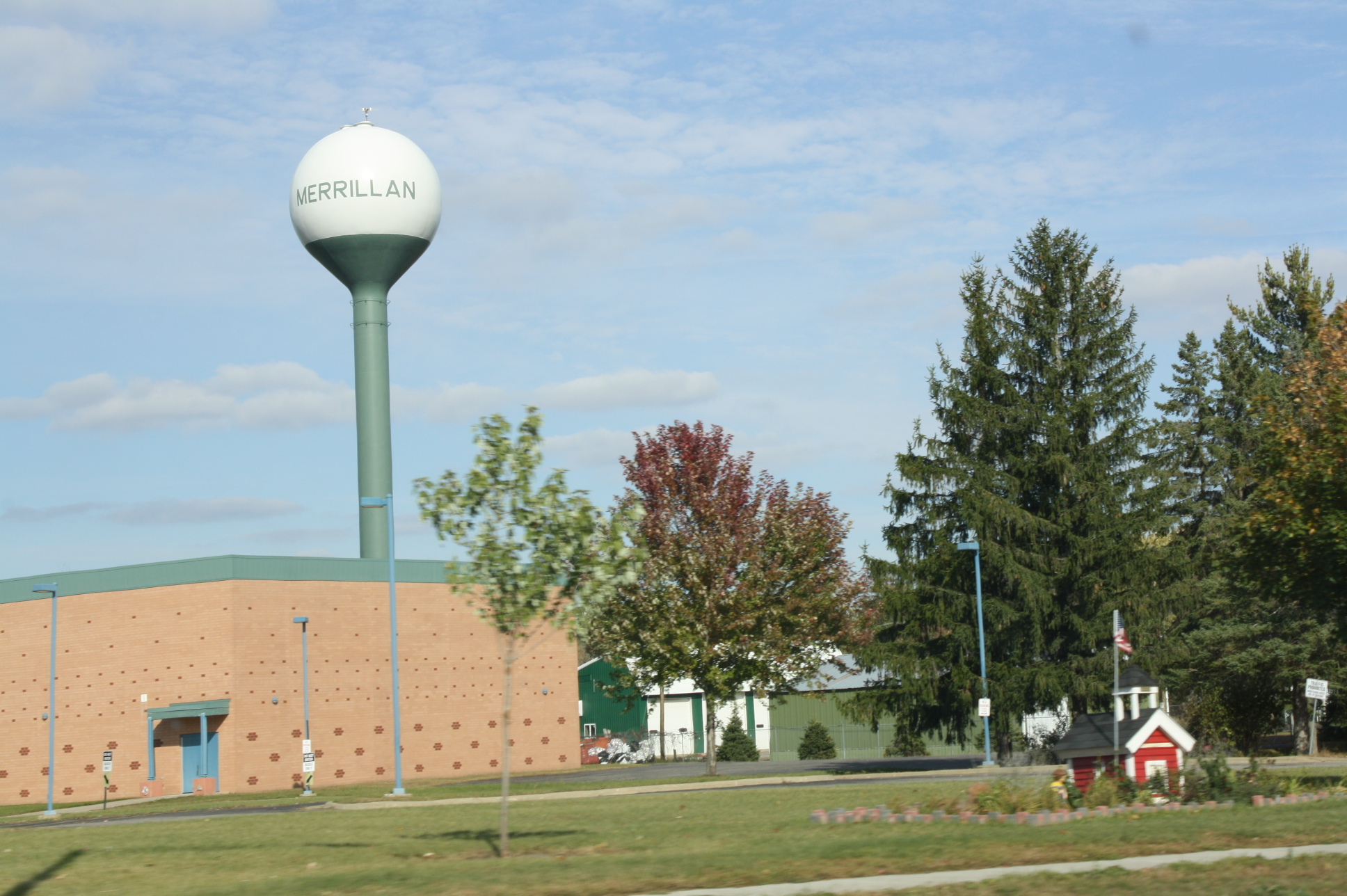
Water tower

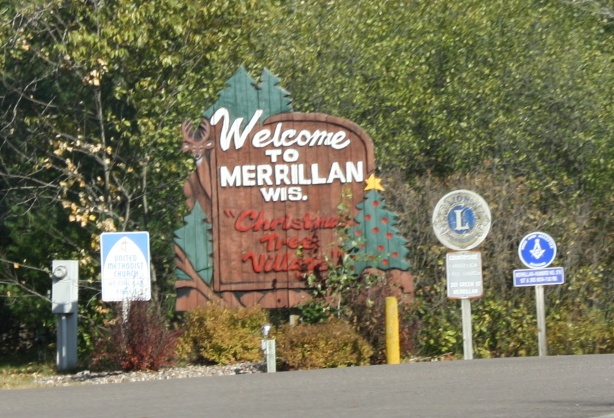
City welcome sign

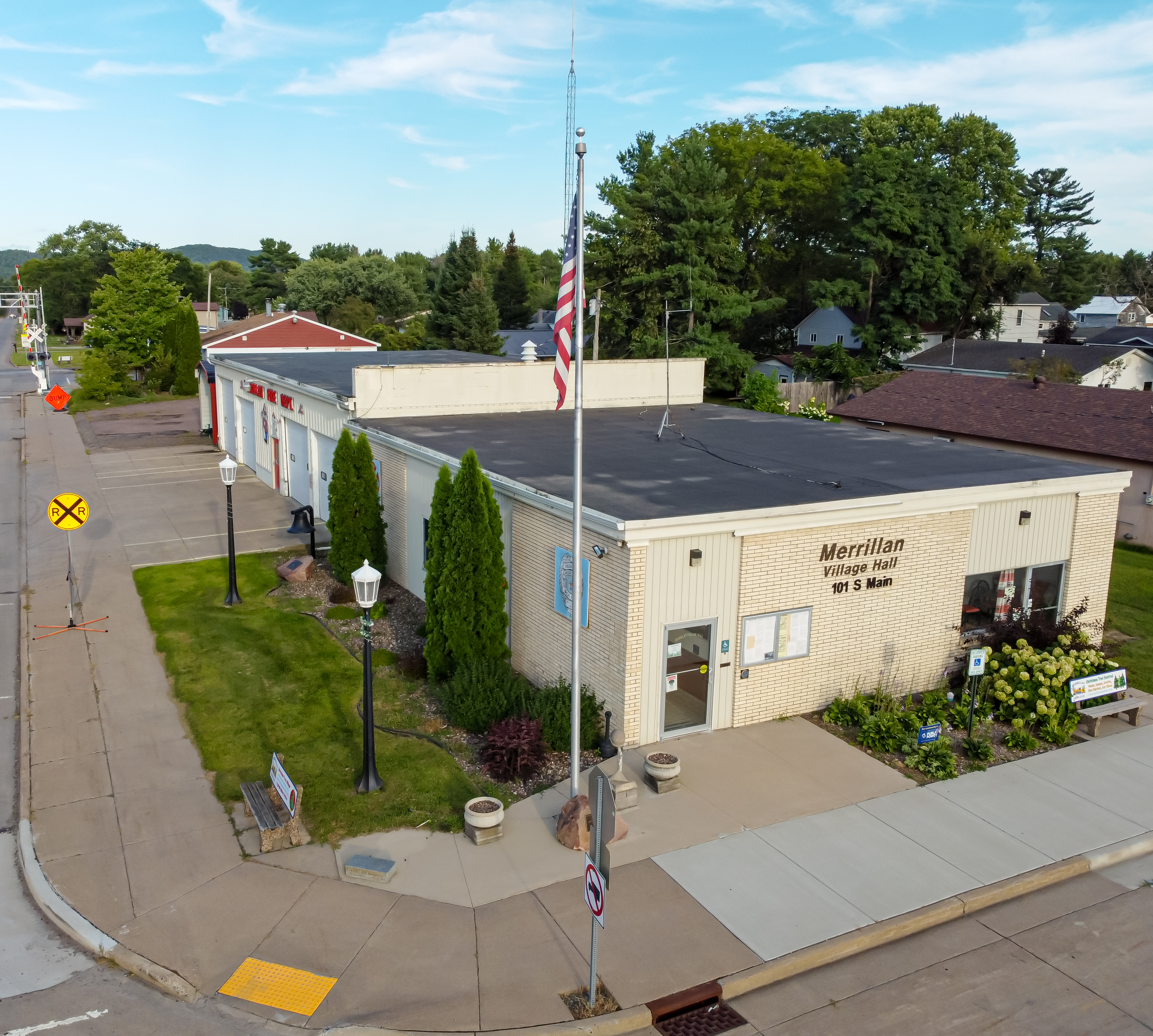
Village hall

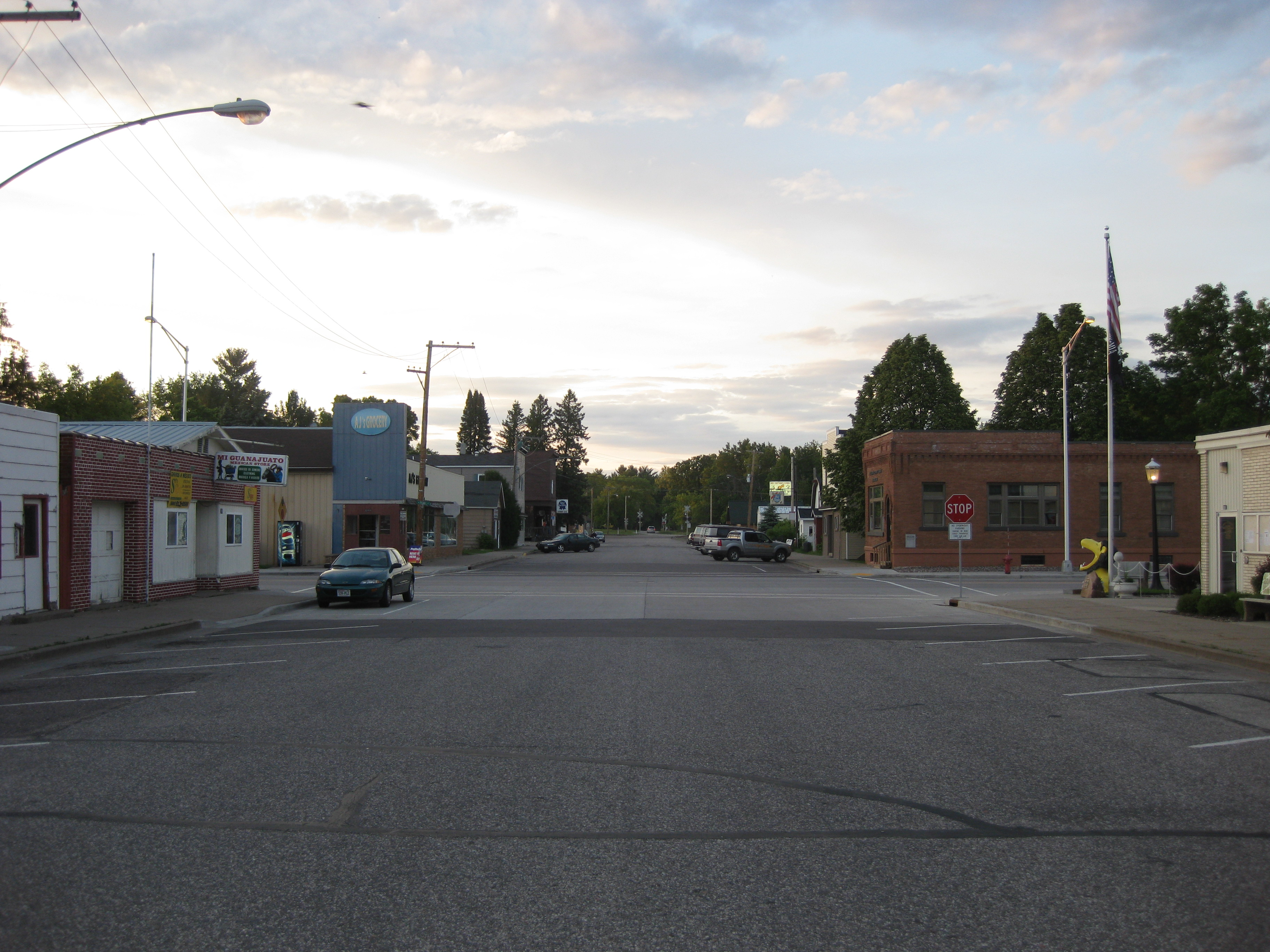
Downtown Merrillan
