= Dover, Buffalo County, Wisconsin =

Dover, Wisconsin
- Town
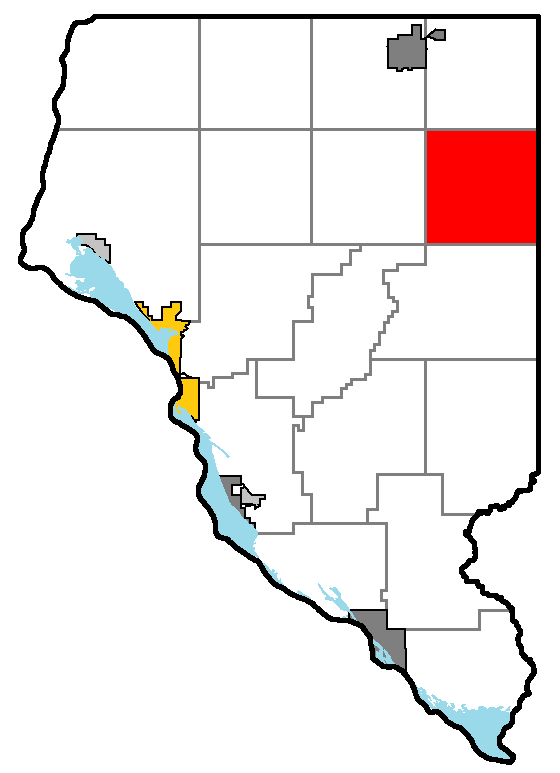
- Location of Dover, Buffalo County

- Location of Buffalo County, Wisconsin
- Coordinates: 44°28′17″N 91°34′46″W
- Country: United States
- State: Wisconsin
- County: Buffalo

Area
  - Total: 36.22 sq mi (93.80 km^{2})
  - Land: 36.19 sq mi (93.72 km^{2})
  - Water: 0.031 sq mi (0.08 km^{2})
- Elevation: 856 ft (261 m)

Population (2020)
  - Total: 515
  - Density: 14.2/sq mi (5.50/km^{2})
- Time zone: UTC-6 (Central (CST))
  - Summer (DST): UTC-5 (CDT)
- FIPS code: 55-20575
- GNIS feature ID: 1583093

Dover is a town in Buffalo County in the U.S. state of Wisconsin. The population was 515 at the 2020 census. The unincorporated community of Lookout is located in the town.

== Geography ==
Dover is located in northeastern Buffalo County and is bordered by Trempealeau County to the east. According to the United States Census Bureau, the town has a total area of 36.2 square miles (93.8 km^{2}), of which 0.031 square miles (0.08 km^{2}), or 0.09%, is water.

== Demographics ==
As of the census of 2000, there were 484 people, 145 households, and 122 families residing in the town. The population density was 13.4 people per square mile (5.2/km^{2}). There were 156 housing units at an average density of 4.3 per square mile (1.7/km^{2}). The racial makeup of the town was 97.93% White and 2.07% Asian. Hispanic or Latino of any race were 0.21% of the population.

There were 145 households, out of which 44.8% had children under the age of 18 living with them, 75.9% were married couples living together, 5.5% had a female householder with no husband present, and 15.2% were non-families. 13.1% of all households were made up of individuals, and 6.2% had someone living alone who was 65 years of age or older. The average household size was 3.34 and the average family size was 3.68.

In the town, the population was spread out, with 35.7% under the age of 18, 7.9% from 18 to 24, 28.7% from 25 to 44, 18.2% from 45 to 64, and 9.5% who were 65 years of age or older. The median age was 31 years. For every 100 females, there were 125.1 males. For every 100 females age 18 and over, there were 128.7 males.

The median income for a household in the town was $40,625, and the median income for a family was $42,500. Males had a median income of $26,538 versus $20,833 for females. The per capita income for the town was $12,821. About 5.1% of families and 9.0% of the population were below the poverty line, including 12.6% of those under age 18 and 7.5% of those age 65 or over.
