= Burnside, Wisconsin =

- Town
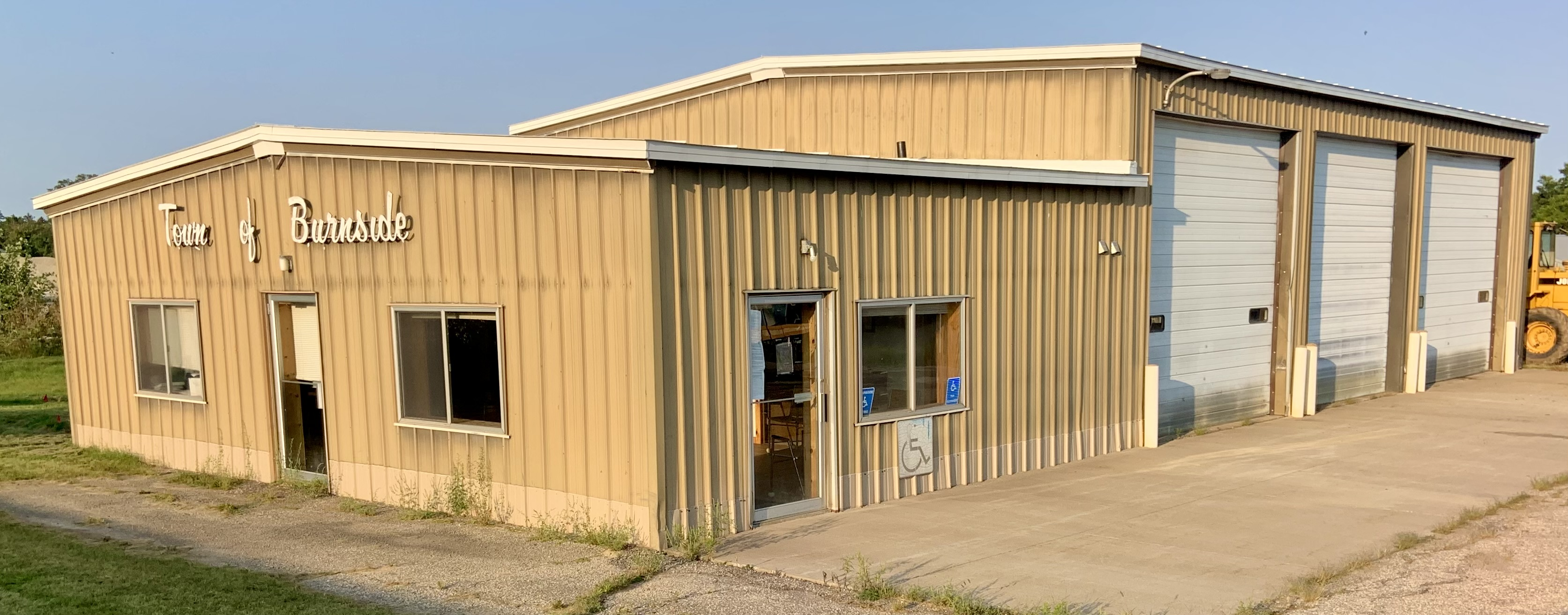
- Town hall

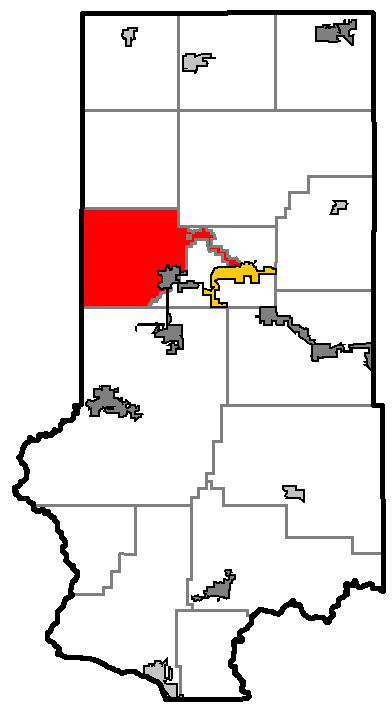
- Location of Burnside, Trempealeau County

- Location of Trempealeau County, Wisconsin
- Coordinates: 44°22′27″N 91°28′48″W
- Country: United States
- State: Wisconsin
- County: Trempealeau

Area
  - Total: 35.1 sq mi (90.8 km^{2})
  - Land: 35.0 sq mi (90.6 km^{2})
  - Water: 0.039 sq mi (0.1 km^{2})
- Elevation: 938 ft (286 m)

Population (2020)
  - Total: 507
  - Density: 14.5/sq mi (5.60/km^{2})
- Time zone: UTC-6 (Central (CST))
  - Summer (DST): UTC-5 (CDT)
- FIPS code: 55-11325
- GNIS feature ID: 1582892

Burnside is a town in Trempealeau County, Wisconsin, United States. As of the 2020 census, the population was 507. The ghost town of New City was located in the town. The town was named after Civil War general Ambrose Burnside.

== Geography ==
According to the United States Census Bureau, the town has a total area of 35.0 square miles (90.8 km^{2}), of which 35.0 square miles (90.6 km^{2}) is land and 0.1 square mile (0.1 km^{2}) (0.14%) is water.

== Demographics ==
As of the census of 2000, there were 529 people, 197 households, and 144 families residing in the town. The population density was 15.1 people per square mile (5.8/km^{2}). There were 202 housing units at an average density of 5.8 per square mile (2.2/km^{2}). The racial makeup of the town was 99.43% White, and 0.57% from two or more races. Hispanic or Latino of any race were 0.38% of the population.

There were 197 households, out of which 32.0% had children under the age of 18 living with them, 59.4% were married couples living together, 7.1% had a female householder with no husband present, and 26.9% were non-families. 22.8% of all households were made up of individuals, and 10.7% had someone living alone who was 65 years of age or older. The average household size was 2.69 and the average family size was 3.15.

In the town, the population was spread out, with 26.8% under the age of 18, 8.3% from 18 to 24, 28.9% from 25 to 44, 21.0% from 45 to 64, and 14.9% who were 65 years of age or older. The median age was 37 years. For every 100 females, there were 115.0 males. For every 100 females age 18 and over, there were 122.4 males.

The median income for a household in the town was $41,111, and the median income for a family was $46,250. Males had a median income of $26,989 versus $21,167 for females. The per capita income for the town was $18,612. About 2.2% of families and 6.5% of the population were below the poverty line, including 6.3% of those under age 18 and 6.8% of those age 65 or over.
