= Garden Valley, Wisconsin =

- Town
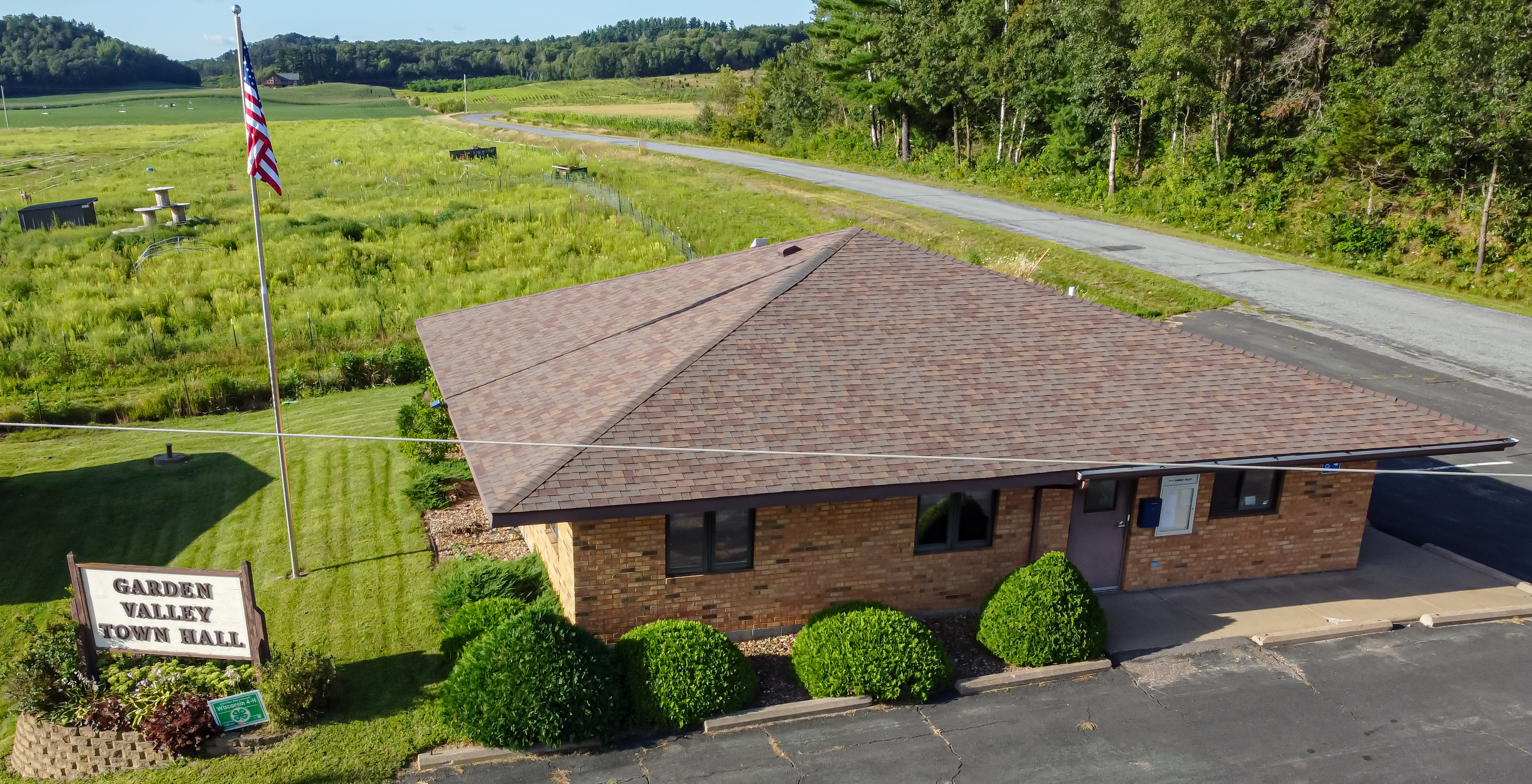
- Town hall

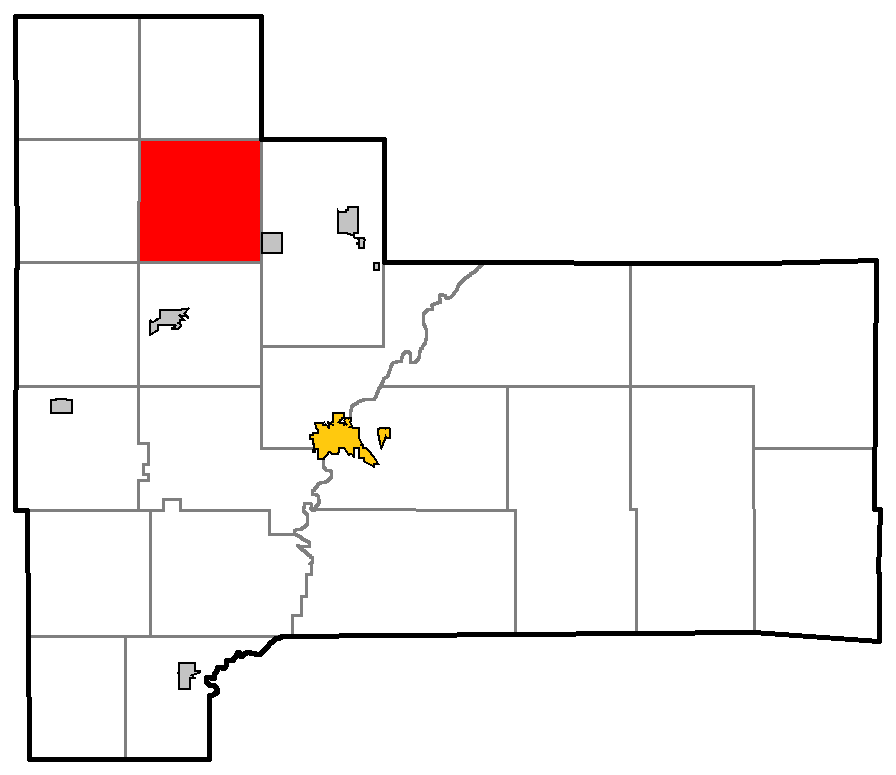
- Location of Garden Valley, Jackson County

- Location of Jackson County, Wisconsin
- Coordinates: 44°27′39″N 90°58′34″W
- Country: United States
- State: Wisconsin
- County: Jackson

Area
  - Total: 36.2 sq mi (93.8 km^{2})
  - Land: 36.2 sq mi (93.8 km^{2})
  - Water: 0 sq mi (0.0 km^{2})
- Elevation: 1,120 ft (340 m)

Population (2020)
  - Total: 395
  - Density: 10.9/sq mi (4.21/km^{2})
- Time zone: UTC-6 (Central (CST))
  - Summer (DST): UTC-5 (CDT)
- FIPS code: 55-28250
- GNIS feature ID: 1583255
- Website: https://www.townofgardenvalleywi.gov/

Garden Valley is a town in Jackson County, Wisconsin, United States. The population was 395 at the 2020 census. The unincorporated community of North Branch is located in the town.

== Geography ==
According to the United States Census Bureau, the town has a total area of 36.2 square miles (93.8 km^{2}), all land.

== Demographics ==
As of the census of 2000, there were 406 people, 147 households, and 110 families residing in the town. The population density was 11.2 people per square mile (4.3/km^{2}). There were 169 housing units at an average density of 4.7 per square mile (1.8/km^{2}). The racial makeup of the town was 95.57% White, 0.99% African American, 0.74% Native American, 0.49% Asian, 0.25% Pacific Islander, 1.72% from other races, and 0.25% from two or more races. Hispanic or Latino of any race were 2.22% of the population.

There were 147 households, out of which 36.1% had children under the age of 18 living with them, 70.1% were married couples living together, 3.4% had a female householder with no husband present, and 24.5% were non-families. 21.1% of all households were made up of individuals, and 6.8% had someone living alone who was 65 years of age or older. The average household size was 2.76 and the average family size was 3.23.

In the town, the population was spread out, with 28.8% under the age of 18, 7.1% from 18 to 24, 30.0% from 25 to 44, 24.1% from 45 to 64, and 9.9% who were 65 years of age or older. The median age was 36 years. For every 100 females, there were 112.6 males. For every 100 females aged 18 and over, there were 120.6 males.

The median income for a household in the town was $40,417, and the median income for a family was $45,568. Males had a median income of $30,000 versus $21,250 for females. The per capita income for the town was $18,191. About 5.7% of families and 9.0% of the population were below the poverty line, including 12.0% of those under age 18 and 3.2% of those age 65 or over.
