= Hixton, Wisconsin =

- Village
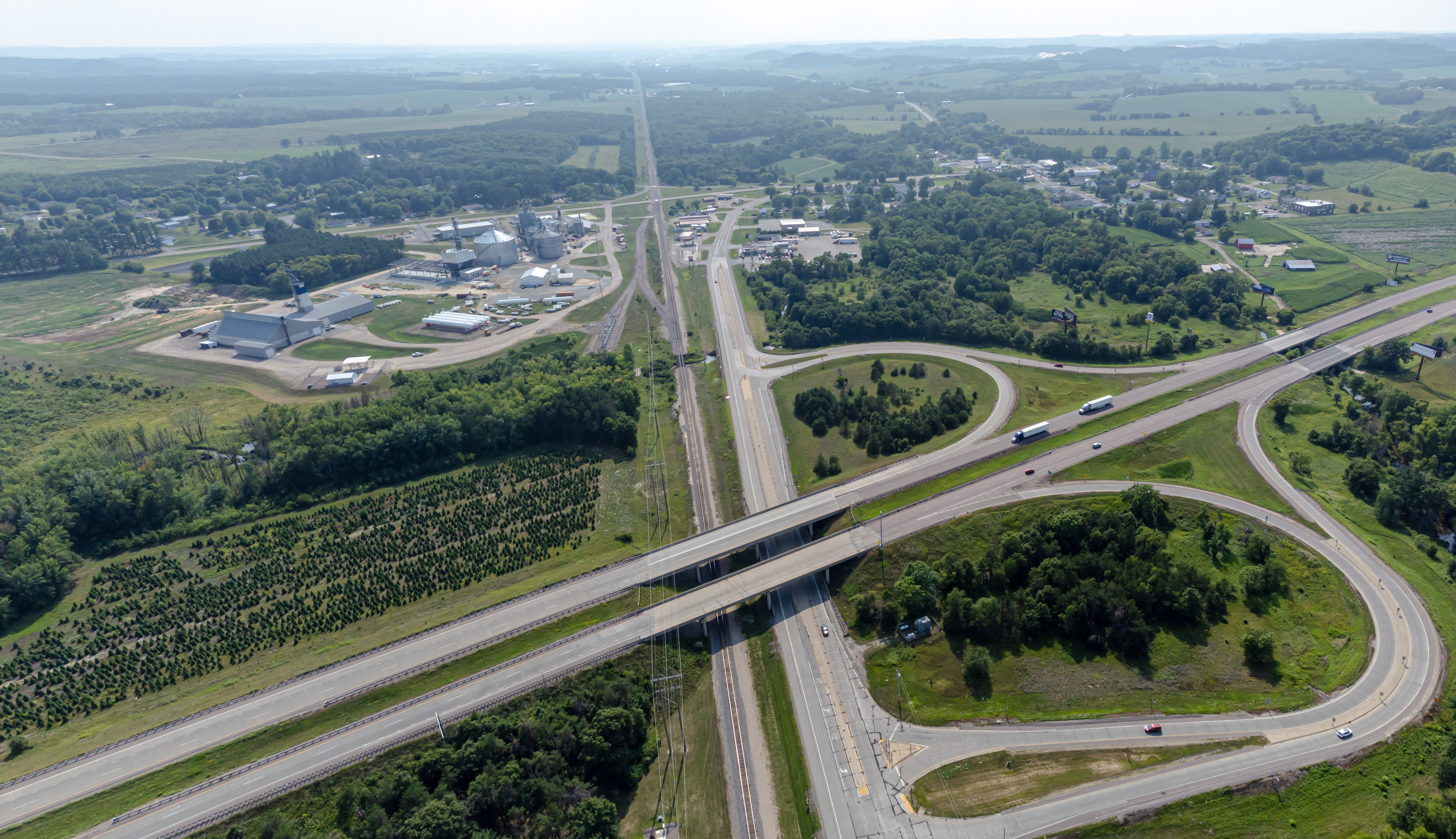

- Location of Hixton in Jackson County, Wisconsin.
- Coordinates: 44°23′14″N 90°59′39″W
- Country: United States
- State: Wisconsin
- County: Jackson

Area
  - Total: 1.14 sq mi (2.95 km^{2})
  - Land: 1.14 sq mi (2.95 km^{2})
  - Water: 0 sq mi (0.00 km^{2})
- Elevation: 965 ft (294 m)

Population (2020)
  - Total: 456
  - Density: 400/sq mi (155/km^{2})
- Time zone: UTC-6 (Central (CST))
  - Summer (DST): UTC-5 (CDT)
- Area codes: 715 & 534
- FIPS code: 55-35100
- GNIS feature ID: 1566491
- Website: villageofhixton.com

Hixton is a village in Jackson County, Wisconsin, United States, along the Trempealeau River. The population was 456 at the 2020 census. The village is located within the Town of Hixton.

== History ==
The community was started by John L. Hicks, who came to the area in 1854. The town of Hixton (formed out of a piece of Albion) was formed and named in 1856. The community was at first named Williamport, and later Pole Grove. The local post office was established in 1856 as "Pole Grove," and was renamed Hixton in 1874. The Green Bay and Minnesota Railroad came through the area and opened a station at Hixton in 1873. The community was incorporated in 1920.

== Geography ==
Hixton is located at 44°22′55″N 91°0′53″W (44.382042, -91.014849).

According to the United States Census Bureau, the village has a total area of 1.09 square miles (2.82 km^{2}), all land.

Wisconsin Highway 95 runs through the village, and is also an exit on Interstate 94, which passes through the northeastern part of the village.

== Demographics ==
Historical population
Census	Pop.	Note	%±
1930	270		—
1940	301		11.5%
1950	315		4.7%
1960	310		−1.6%
1970	300		−3.2%
1980	364		21.3%
1990	345		−5.2%
2000	446		29.3%
2010	433		−2.9%
2020	456		5.3%
U.S. Decennial Census

=== 2010 census ===
As of the census of 2010, there were 433 people, 200 households, and 121 families living in the village. The population density was 397.2 inhabitants per square mile (153.4/km^{2}). There were 219 housing units at an average density of 200.9 per square mile (77.6/km^{2}). The racial makeup of the village was 94.9% White, 3.0% Native American, 0.2% Asian, 0.2% from other races, and 1.6% from two or more races. Hispanic or Latino of any race were 1.4% of the population.

There were 200 households, of which 24.5% had children under the age of 18 living with them, 43.5% were married couples living together, 11.0% had a female householder with no husband present, 6.0% had a male householder with no wife present, and 39.5% were non-families. 34.5% of all households were made up of individuals, and 18% had someone living alone who was 65 years of age or older. The average household size was 2.17 and the average family size was 2.71.

The median age in the village was 40.3 years. 21.9% of residents were under the age of 18; 7.5% were between the ages of 18 and 24; 25.6% were from 25 to 44; 28.5% were from 45 to 64; and 16.6% were 65 years of age or older. The gender makeup of the village was 51.3% male and 48.7% female.

=== 2000 census ===
As of the census of 2000, there were 446 people, 203 households, and 116 families living in the village. The population density was 416.4 people per square mile (160.9/km^{2}). There were 217 housing units at an average density of 202.6 per square mile (78.3/km^{2}). The racial makeup of the village was 98.65% White, 1.12% Native American, and 0.22% from two or more races. 0.22% of the population were Hispanic or Latino of any race.

There were 203 households, out of which 25.6% had children under the age of 18 living with them, 48.3% were married couples living together, 5.4% had a female householder with no husband present, and 42.4% were non-families. 35.0% of all households were made up of individuals, and 18.7% had someone living alone who was 65 years of age or older. The average household size was 2.20 and the average family size was 2.89.

In the village, the population was spread out, with 23.3% under the age of 18, 6.1% from 18 to 24, 27.4% from 25 to 44, 20.4% from 45 to 64, and 22.9% who were 65 years of age or older. The median age was 41 years. For every 100 females, there were 102.7 males. For every 100 females age 18 and over, there were 103.6 males.

The median income for a household in the village was $28,839, and the median income for a family was $41,500. Males had a median income of $28,958 versus $18,587 for females. The per capita income for the village was $16,314. About 3.5% of families and 8.3% of the population were below the poverty line, including 9.7% of those under age 18 and 13.6% of those age 65 or over.

== Images ==
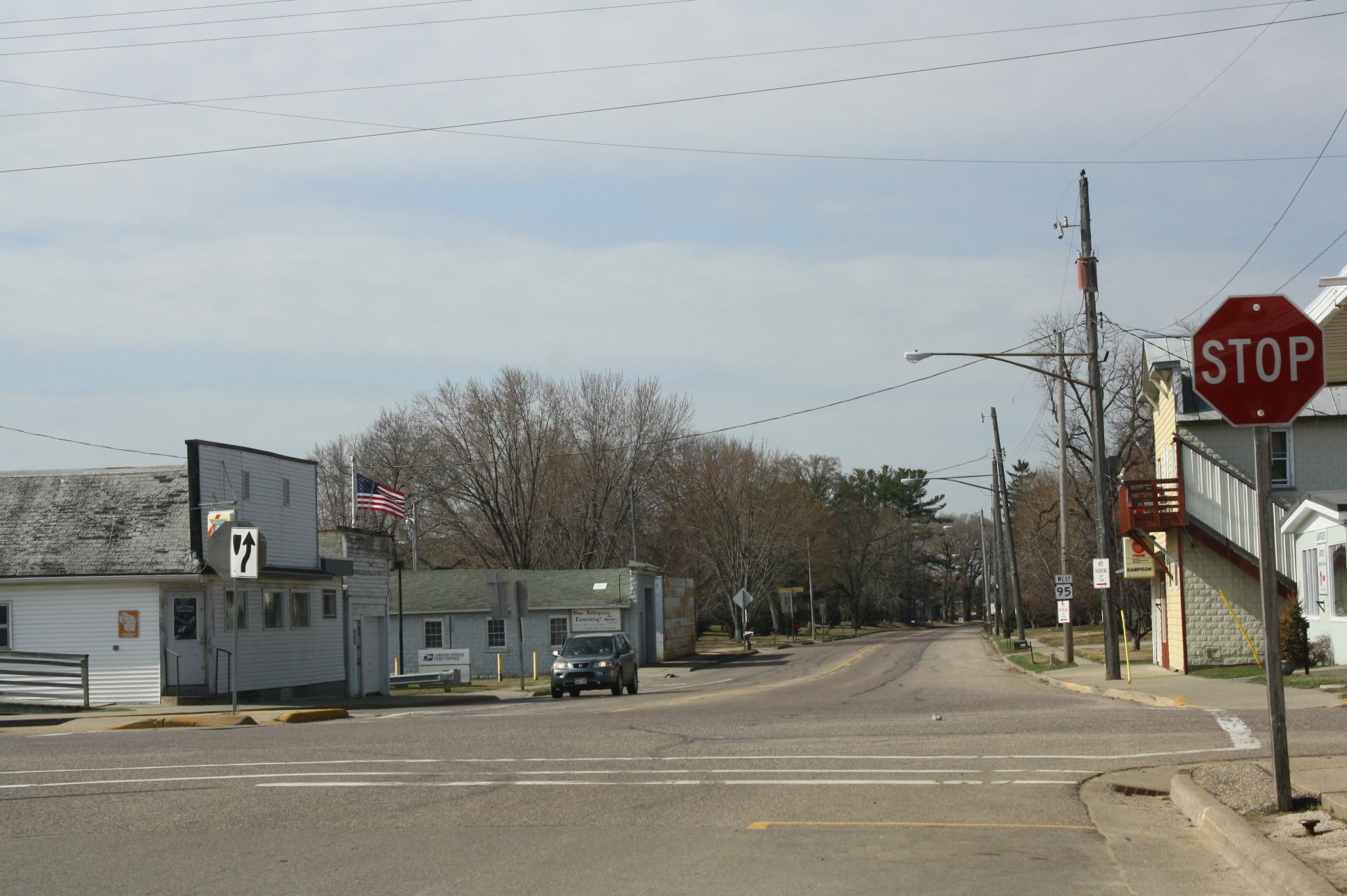
Looking southwest from downtown Hixton

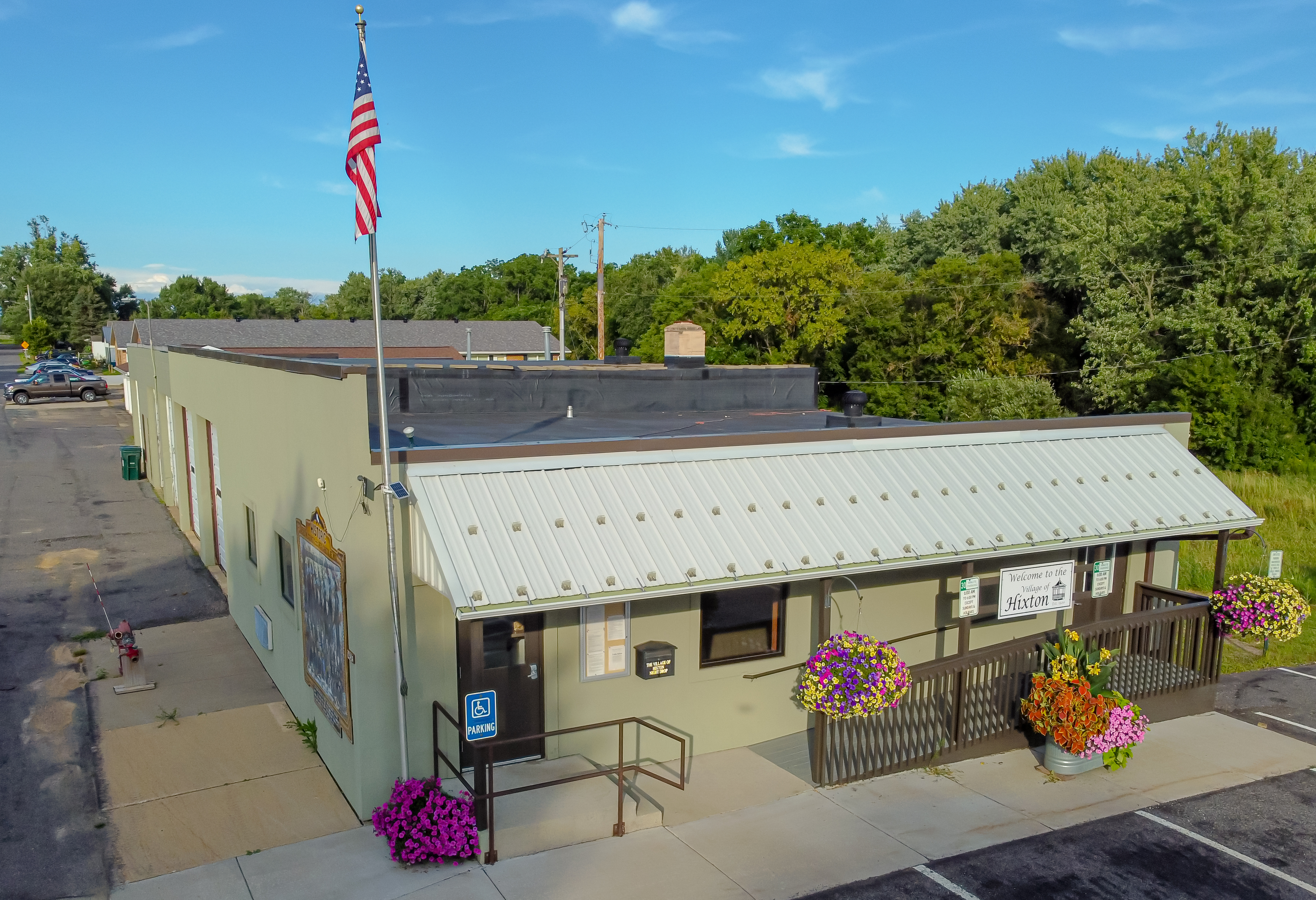
Hixton Village Hall

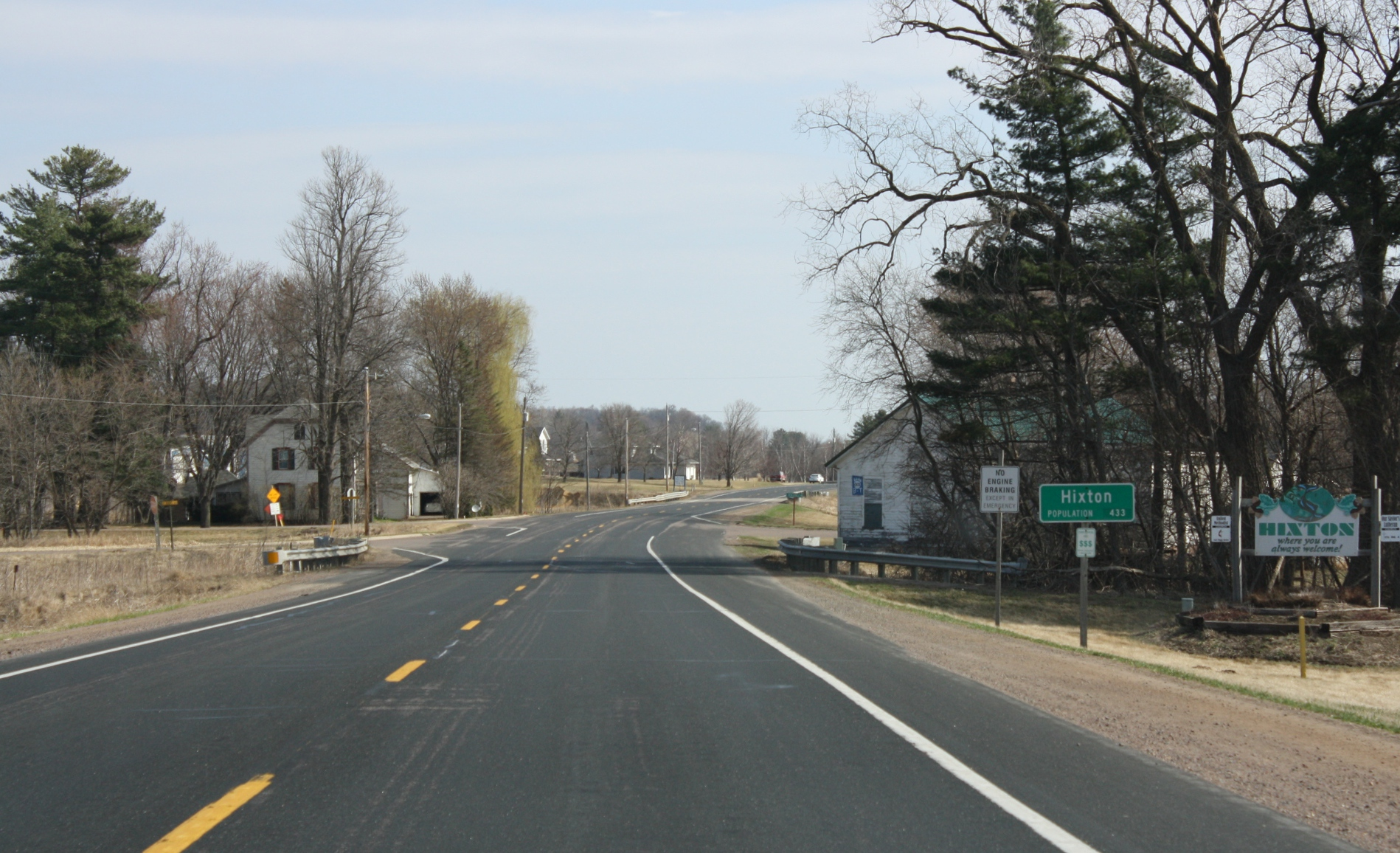
Sign on WIS 95

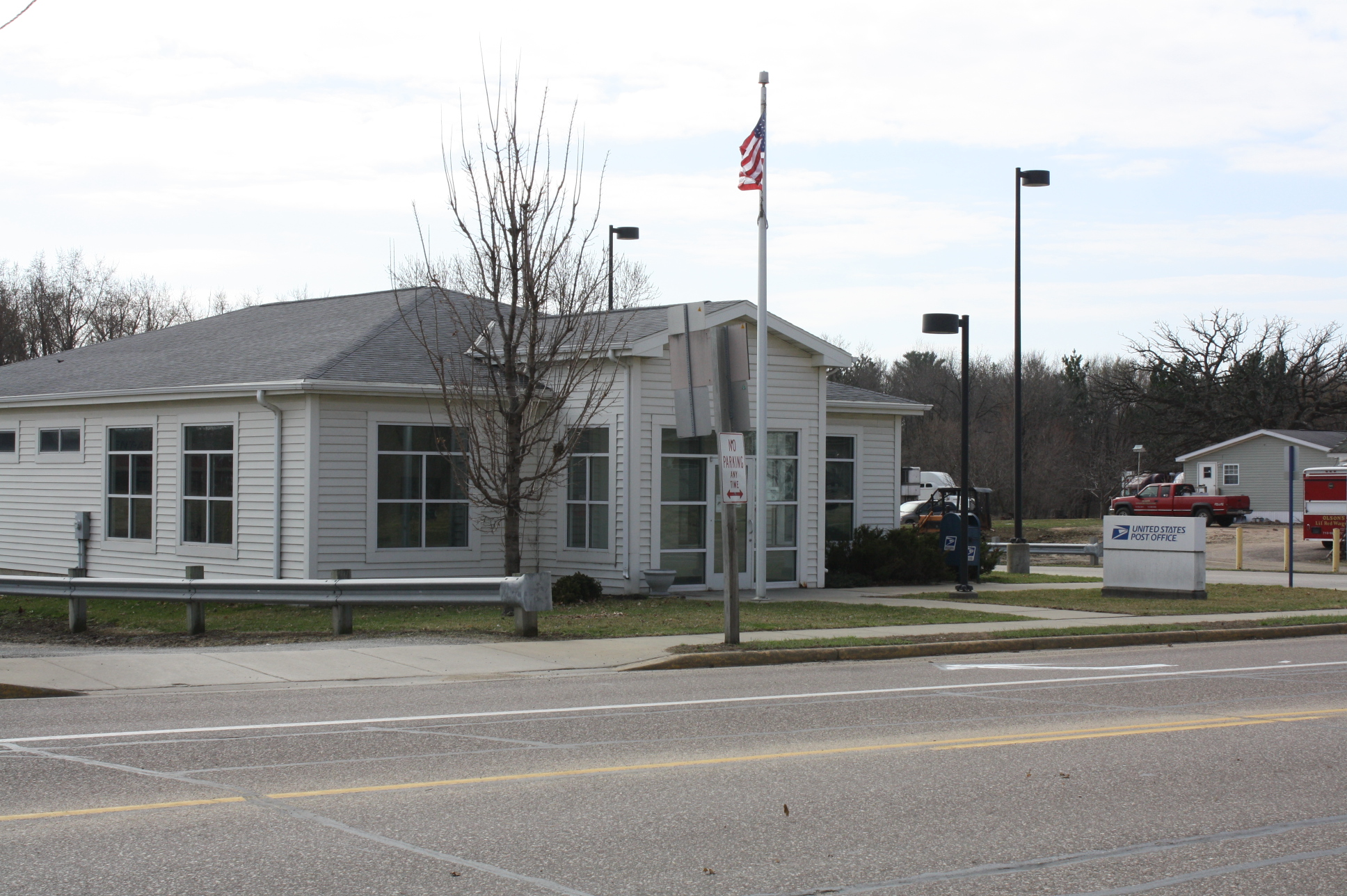
Post office

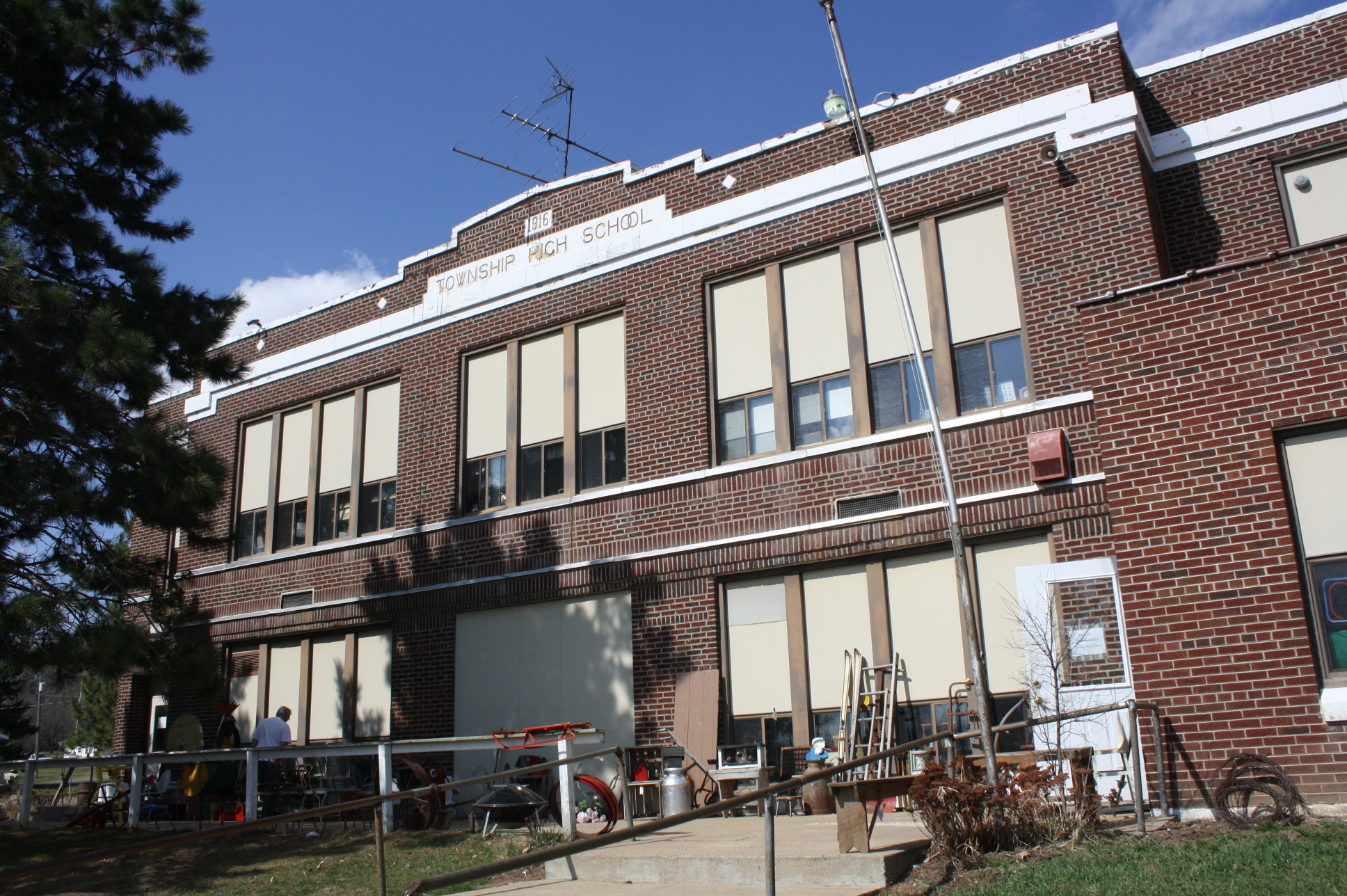
Former high school

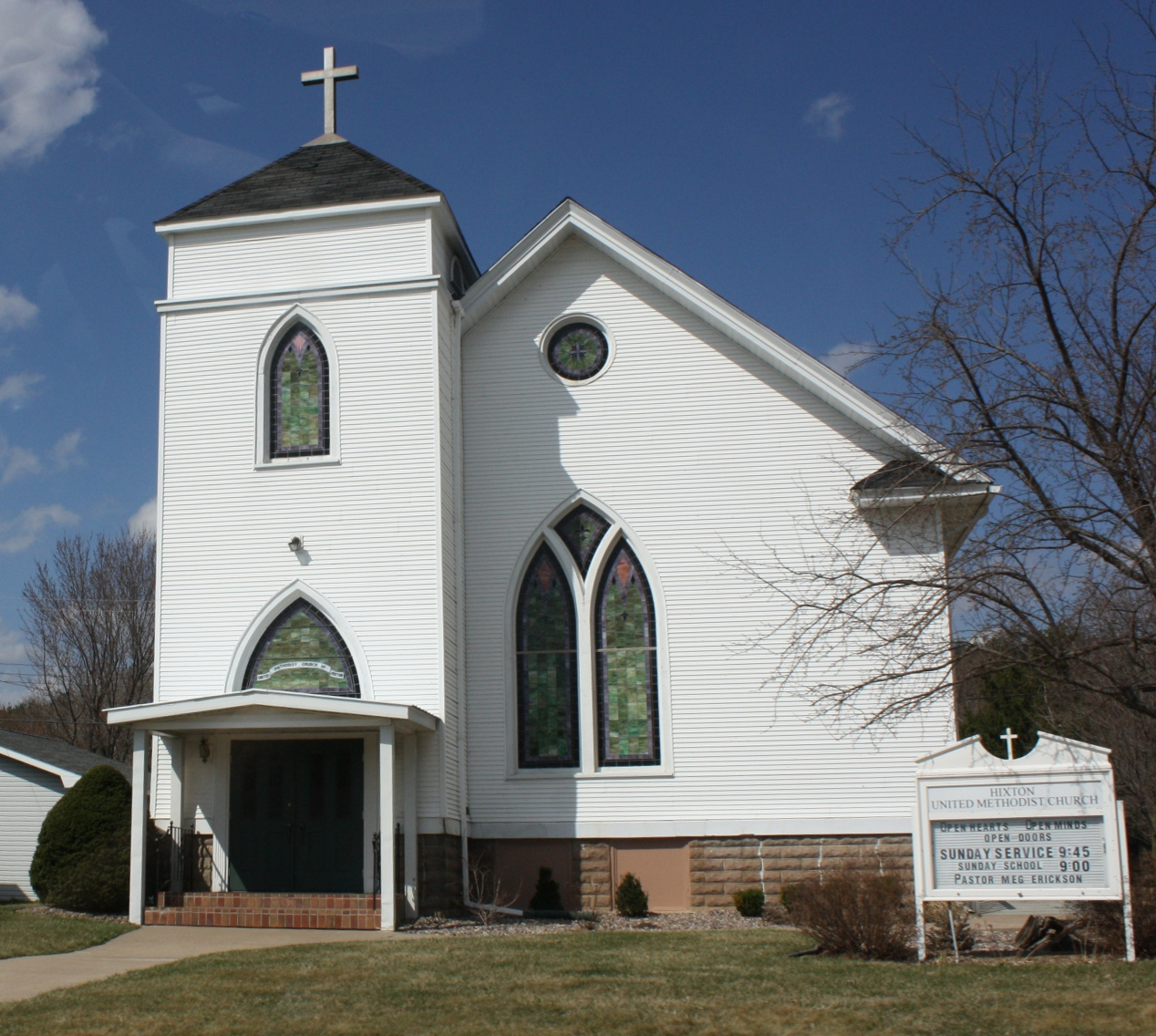
Methodist church

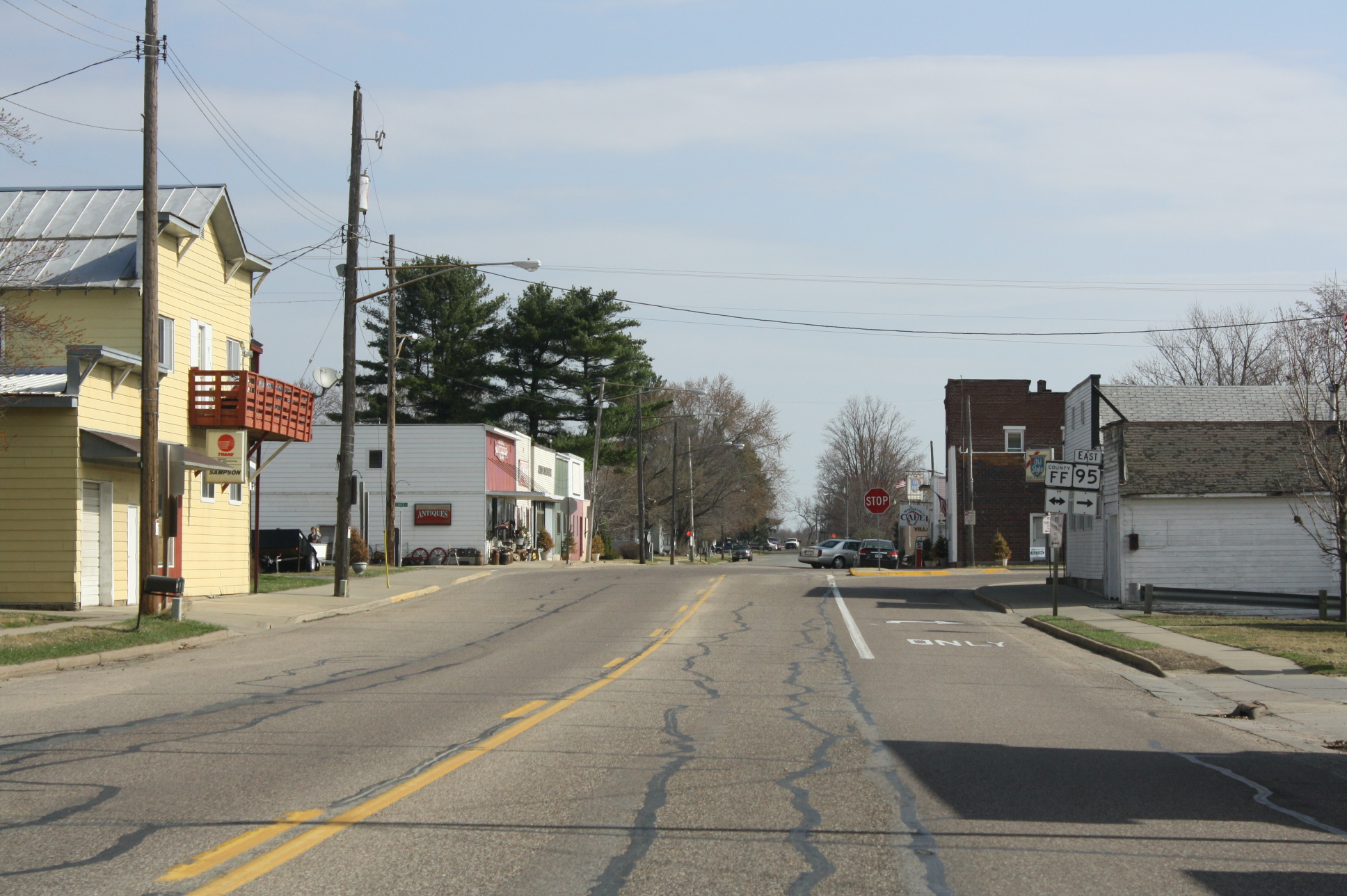
Looking northeast in downtown Hixton
