= List of locks and dams of the Upper Mississippi River =

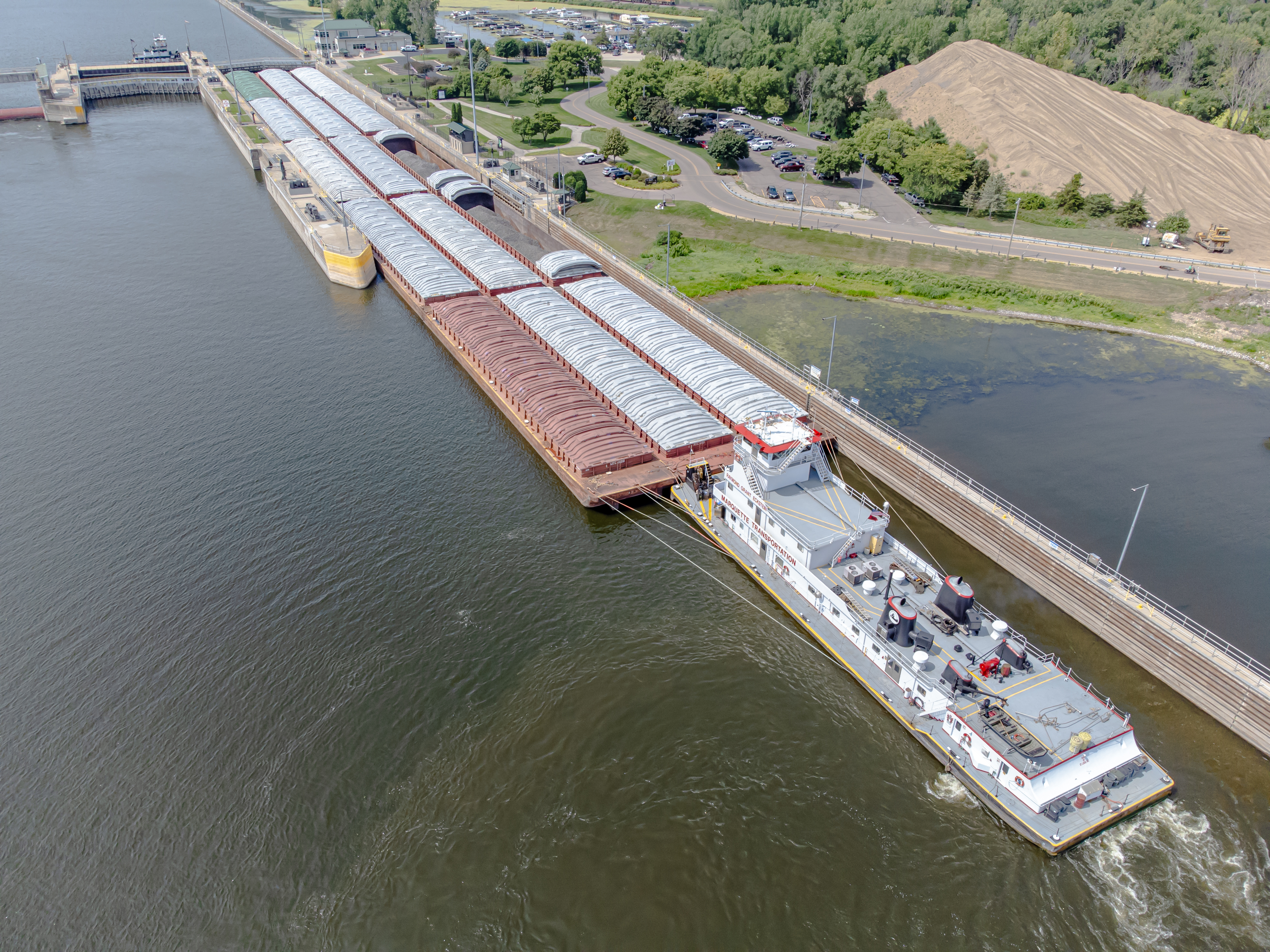
Upper Mississippi River Lock and Dam No. 6

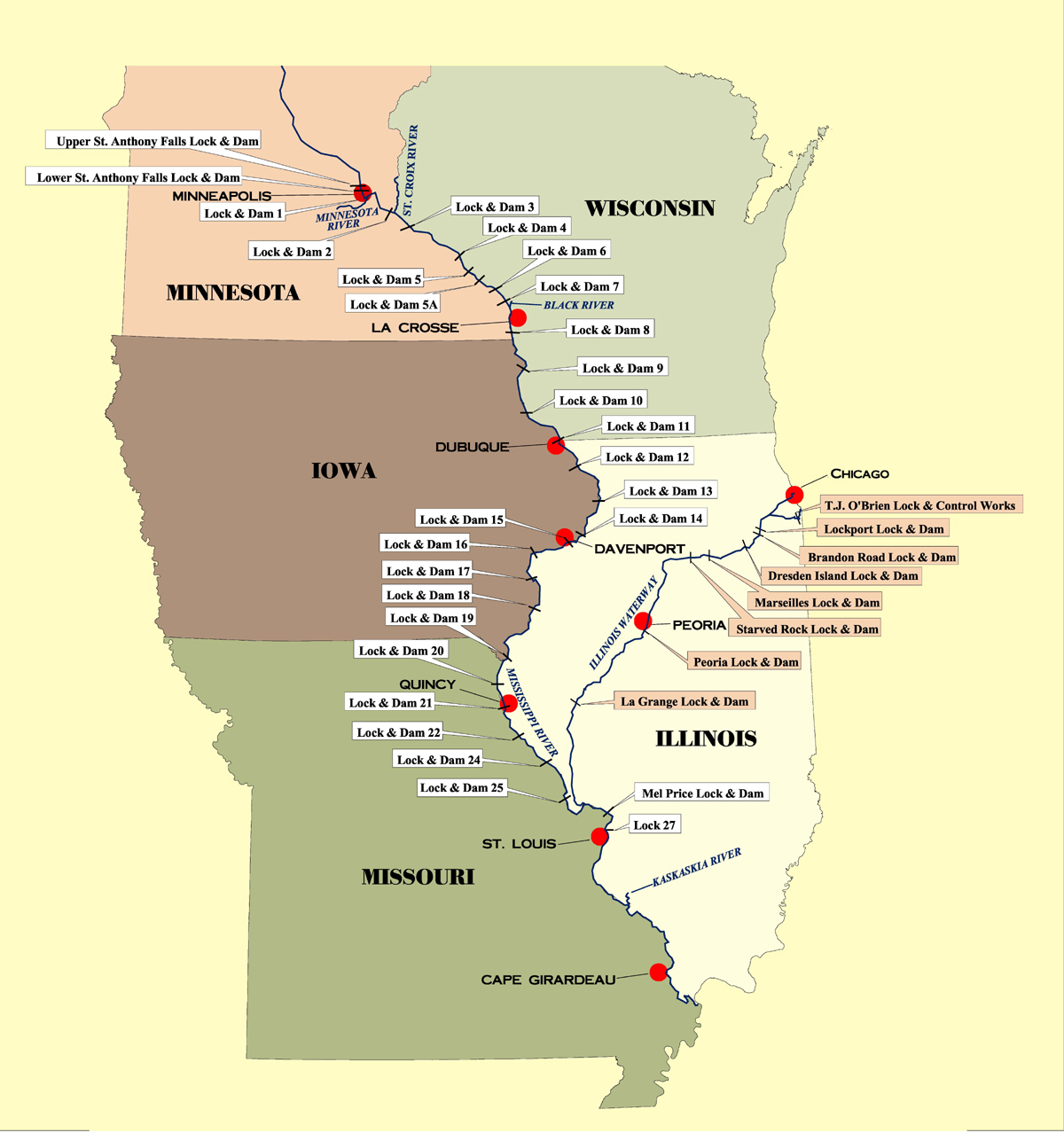
Upper Mississippi locks and dams

This is a list of current and former locks and dams of the Upper Mississippi River which ends at the Mississippi River's confluence with the Ohio River at Cairo, Illinois.

== Locks and dams ==
Name	Location	Miles above the Ohio	Coordinates	Pool elevation	Notes
=== Minnesota ===
Lake Itasca Stepping Stones / Dam	Itasca State Park		47°14′23.2″N 95°12′27.6″W	Lake Itasca; 1,475 feet	Stepping stones placed by CCC with creation of new channel / outlet for Mississippi
Vekin's Dam	8 miles north of Lake Itasca		47°17′59.8″N 95°14′30.0″W	n/a	Wooden dam from the late 1800s
Ottertail Power Co. Dam	7 miles east of Bemidji		47°29′1.0032″N 94°43′45.9156″W	Lake Bemidji; 1,335 feet	
Knutson Dam	About 15 miles (24 km) east and north of city of Cass Lake		47°27′07″N 94°29′00″W	Cass Lake; 1,301 feet	
Winnibigoshish Lake Dam	About 15 miles (24 km) northwest of Deer River		47°25′44.5″N 94°03′6.8″W	Lake Winnibigoshish; 1,290 feet	Owned/operated by U.S. Army Corps of Engineers, Mississippi Valley Division, St. Paul District
Pokegama Dam	Mile 1187		47°15′2.9844″N 93°35′15.5184″W		Owned/operated by U.S. Army Corps of Engineers, Mississippi Valley Division, St. Paul District
Blandin Paper Co. Dam	Mile 1183.6		47°13′54.5628″N 93°31′52.9500″W		
Potlatch Dam	Brainerd, Minnesota		46°22′40.8324″N 94°11′0.0816″W	Rice Lake; 1,174 Feet	
Little Falls Dam	Little Falls, Minnesota		45°58′32″N 94°22′06″W		
Blanchard Dam	Royalton, Minnesota		45°51′39″N 94°21′36″W		
Sartell Dam	Sartell, Minnesota		45°37′15″N 94°12′13″W		
St. Cloud Dam	St. Cloud, Minnesota		45°32′52″N 94°08′50″W		
Coon Rapids Dam	Brooklyn Park / Coon Rapids, Minnesota		45°08′36″N 93°18′43″W		No locks, ends navigable portion of river
Upper Saint Anthony Falls Lock and Dam	Minneapolis, Minnesota	~854	44°58′54″N 93°15′31″W	799 feet	Last lock upstream on river. Since June 9, 2015, the lock has remained closed to prevent the spread of invasive Asian Carp. Located within the Mississippi National River and Recreation Area.
Lower Saint Anthony Falls Lock and Dam	Minneapolis, Minnesota	~853	44°58′42″N 93°14′49″W	750 feet	Owned/operated by U.S. Army Corps of Engineers, Mississippi Valley Division, St. Paul District
Meeker Island Lock and Dam (demolished)	Minneapolis, Minnesota / St. Paul, Minnesota	~850	44°57′14″N 93°12′28″W	NA	Demolished. Originally known as Lock and Dam No. 2
Lock and Dam No. 1	Minneapolis, Minnesota / St. Paul, Minnesota	~847.8	44°54′55″N 93°12′02″W	725 feet	Ford Plant Powerhouse on east side. Owned/operated by U.S. Army Corps of Engineers, Mississippi Valley Division, St. Paul District
Lock and Dam No. 2	Hastings, Minnesota	~815	44°45′35″N 92°52′07″W	687 feet	Owned/operated by U.S. Army Corps of Engineers, Mississippi Valley Division, St. Paul District
=== Minnesota–Wisconsin ===
Lock and Dam No. 3	Red Wing, Minnesota	796.9	44°36′36″N 92°36′37″W	675 feet	Owned/operated by U.S. Army Corps of Engineers, Mississippi Valley Division, St. Paul District
Lock and Dam No. 4	Alma, Wisconsin	~753	44°19′32″N 91°55′13″W	667 feet	The lock is on the Wisconsin side right next to a small cafe. Owned/operated by U.S. Army Corps of Engineers, Mississippi Valley Division, St. Paul District
Lock and Dam No. 5	Winona County, Minnesota	~738.1	44°09′40″N 91°48′39″W	660 feet	Visitor parking next to the lock. Owned/operated by U.S. Army Corps of Engineers, Mississippi Valley Division, St. Paul District
Lock and Dam No. 5A	Goodview, Minnesota	~728.5	44°05′18″N 91°40′08″W	651 feet	Owned/operated by U.S. Army Corps of Engineers, Mississippi Valley Division, St. Paul District
Lock and Dam No. 6	Trempealeau, Wisconsin	~714.1	43°59′59″N 91°26′18″W	646 feet	Owned/operated by U.S. Army Corps of Engineers, Mississippi Valley Division, St. Paul District
Lock and Dam No. 7	La Crescent, Minnesota	~702.5	43°52′01″N 91°18′26″W	639 feet	Adjacent to I-90 Mississippi River Bridge. Visitor parking and information next to the lock. Owned/operated by U.S. Army Corps of Engineers, Mississippi Valley Division, St. Paul District
Lock and Dam No. 8	Genoa, Wisconsin	~679.2	43°34′12″N 91°13′54″W	631 feet	Visitor parking right next to the lock. Owned/operated by U.S. Army Corps of Engineers, Mississippi Valley Division, St. Paul District
=== Iowa–Wisconsin ===
Lock and Dam No. 9	Harpers Ferry, Iowa	~647.9	43°12′46″N 91°06′15″W	620 feet	Parking area next to lock on Wisconsin side. Owned/operated by U.S. Army Corps of Engineers, Mississippi Valley Division, St. Paul District
Lock and Dam No. 10	Guttenberg, Iowa	~615.0	42°47′06″N 91°05′42″W	611 feet	Owned/operated by U.S. Army Corps of Engineers, Mississippi Valley Division, St. Paul District
Lock and Dam No. 11	Dubuque, Iowa	~583	42°32′25″N 90°38′39″W	603 feet	Owned/operated by U.S. Army Corps of Engineers, Mississippi Valley Division, Rock Island District
=== Iowa–Illinois ===
Lock and Dam No. 12	Bellevue, Iowa	~556.7	42°15′41″N 90°25′12″W	592 feet	Owned/operated by U.S. Army Corps of Engineers, Mississippi Valley Division, Rock Island District
Lock and Dam No. 13	Fulton, IL	~522.5	41°53′53″N 90°09′21″W	583 feet	Owned/operated by U.S. Army Corps of Engineers, Mississippi Valley Division, Rock Island District
Lock and Dam No. 14	LeClaire, Iowa	~493.2	41°34′24″N 90°23′56″W	572 feet	Owned/operated by U.S. Army Corps of Engineers, Mississippi Valley Division, Rock Island District
Lock and Dam No. 15	Rock Island, Illinois	~482.8	41°31′07″N 90°34′08″W	561 feet	Owned/operated by U.S. Army Corps of Engineers, Mississippi Valley Division, Rock Island District
Lock and Dam No. 16	Muscatine, Iowa	~457.2	41°25′32″N 91°0′35″W	545 feet	Owned/operated by U.S. Army Corps of Engineers, Mississippi Valley Division, Rock Island District
Lock and Dam No. 17	New Boston, Illinois	~437	41°11′27″N 91°03′37″W	536 feet	Owned/operated by U.S. Army Corps of Engineers, Mississippi Valley Division, Rock Island District
Lock and Dam No. 18	Gladstone, Illinois	~410.5	40°52′54″N 91°01′27″W	528 feet	Owned/operated by U.S. Army Corps of Engineers, Mississippi Valley Division, Rock Island District
Lock and Dam No. 19	Keokuk, Iowa	~364	40°23′41″N 91°22′29″W	518 feet	Owned/operated by U.S. Army Corps of Engineers, Mississippi Valley Division, Rock Island District
=== Missouri–Illinois ===
Lock and Dam No. 20	Canton, Missouri	~343	40°08′37″N 91°30′46″W	480 feet	Owned/operated by U.S. Army Corps of Engineers, Mississippi Valley Division, Rock Island District
Lock and Dam No. 21	Quincy, Illinois	~324.9	39°54′23″N 91°25′56″W	470 feet	Owned/operated by U.S. Army Corps of Engineers, Mississippi Valley Division, Rock Island District
Lock and Dam No. 22	Saverton, Missouri	~301.2	39°38′18″N 91°14′49″W	460 feet	Owned/operated by U.S. Army Corps of Engineers, Mississippi Valley Division, Rock Island District
Lock and Dam No. 24	Clarksville, Missouri	~273.4	39°22′36″N 90°54′30″W	449 feet	Owned/operated by U.S. Army Corps of Engineers, Mississippi Valley Division, St. Louis District
Lock and Dam No. 25	Winfield, Missouri	~241.4	39°00′17″N 90°41′11″W	434 feet	Owned/operated by U.S. Army Corps of Engineers, Mississippi Valley Division, St. Louis District
Lock and Dam No. 26 (historical)	Alton, Illinois	~202.5	38°53′10″N 90°10′55″W	419 feet	Demolished, replaced by Melvin Price Locks and Dam.
Melvin Price Locks and Dam aka Lock and Dam No. 26	East Alton, Illinois	~200.8	38°52′09″N 90°09′13″W		Owned/operated by U.S. Army Corps of Engineers, Mississippi Valley Division, St. Louis District
Chain of Rocks Dam aka Dam No. 27	Glasgow Village, Missouri	~190.2	38°45′27″N 90°10′39″W	398 feet	Owned/operated by U.S. Army Corps of Engineers, Mississippi Valley Division, St. Louis District
Chain of Rocks Lock aka Lock No. 27	Granite City, Illinois		38°42′11″N 90°10′51″W		Owned/operated by U.S. Army Corps of Engineers, Mississippi Valley Division, St. Louis District

== Expansion proposals for upper Mississippi locks ==
The Army Corps of Engineers has studied the expansion of some locks on the Upper Mississippi. Since at least 1999, the Corps has considered expanding 600 ft locks 20, 21, 22, 24, and 25 to 1,200 ft.

Gallery

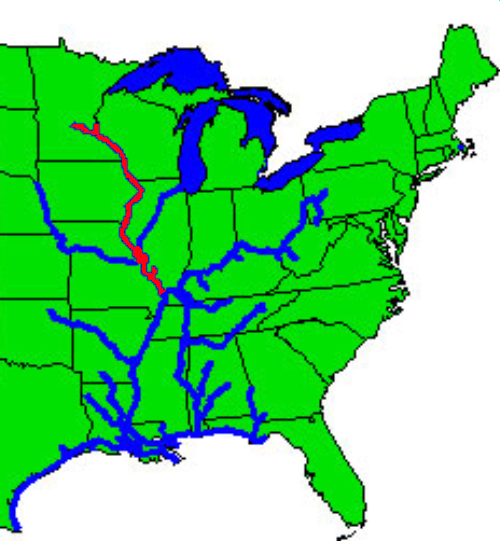
The inland and intercoastal waterways, with the Upper Mississippi highlighted in red.

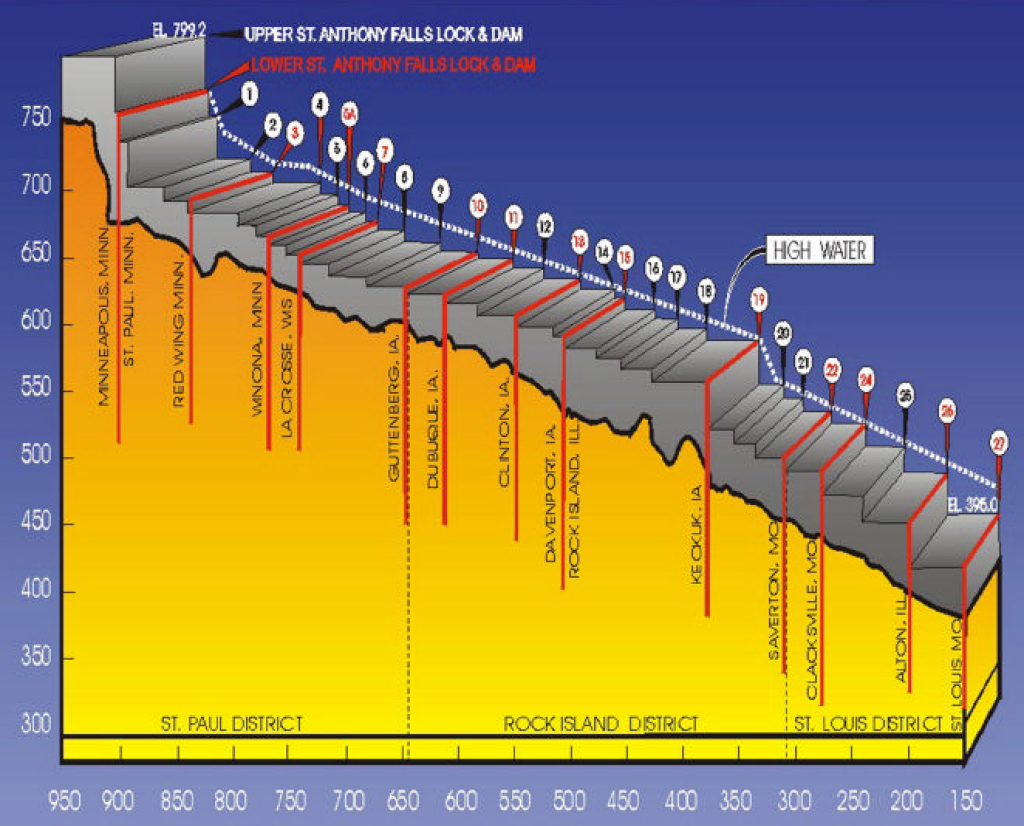
Upper Mississippi River Stairway of Water.

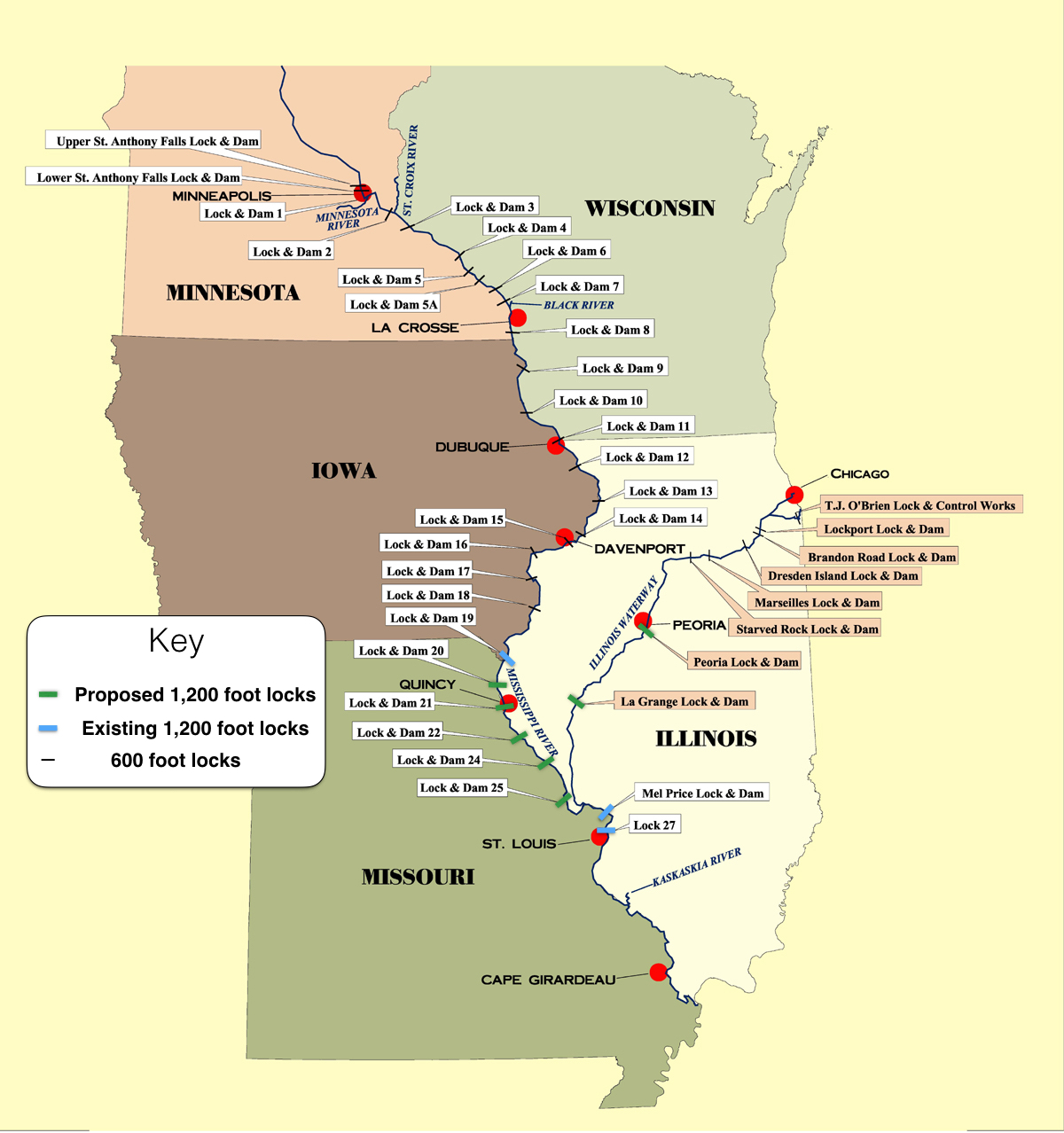
Upper Mississippi locks expansion study

Lock and Dam 6 time lapse

== See also ==
- List of crossings of the Upper Mississippi River
- Mississippi Valley Division
- List of locks and dams of the Ohio River
