= List of presidential trips made by Jimmy Carter (1979) =

This is a list of presidential trips made by Jimmy Carter during 1979, the third year of his presidency as the 39th president of the United States. International trips are highlighted in blue.

This list excludes trips made within Washington, D.C., the U.S. federal capital in which the White House, the official residence and principal workplace of the president, is located. It also excludes the capital's immediate surroundings in Maryland and Virginia, such as Andrews Air Force Base in Maryland, where the president typically boards Air Force One for all trips outside the area. Also excluded are trips to Camp David, the country residence of the president, and to Carter's house in Plains, Georgia.

== January ==
State or country	Areas visited	Dates	Details
France	Basse-Terre, Guadeloupe	January 4–9	Attended the Guadeloupe Conference with President Valéry Giscard d'Estaing, German Chancellor Helmut Schmidt and British Prime Minister James Callaghan.
Georgia	Atlanta	January 14	Visited Gene and Gabe's Restaurant. Received the Martin Luther King, Jr. Nonviolent Peace Prize in a ceremony at Ebenezer Baptist Church.

== February ==
State or country	Areas visited	Dates	Details
Mexico	Mexico City	February 14–16	State visit. Met with President José López Portillo. Addressed the Mexican Congress.
Georgia	Atlanta	February 20	Participated in the unveiling of his gubernatorial portrait at the Georgia State Capitol, where he then addressed a joint session of the Georgia General Assembly. Gave a convocation address at Georgia Tech's Alexander Memorial Coliseum.

== March ==
State or country	Areas visited	Dates	Details
Portugal	Lajes Field	March 8	Stopped en route to Egypt.
Egypt	Cairo, Alexandria, Giza	March 8–10	State visit. Met with President Anwar Sadat. Addressed People's Assembly of Egypt.
Israel	Tel Aviv, Jerusalem	March 10–13	State visit. Met with President Yitzhak Navon and Prime Minister Menachem Begin. Addressed the Knesset.
Egypt	Cairo	March 13	Met with President Anwar Sadat.
Portugal	Lajes Field	March 13	Stopped during return to Washington D.C.
Oklahoma	Elk City	March 24	Held a townhall meeting at the Elk City High School gymnasium.
Wisconsin	Wausau	March 31	Attended a fundraiser for Representative Dave Obey at Newman Catholic High School.
Wisconsin	Milwaukee	March 31	Attended a reception for Representative Clement Zablocki at the Marcus Center. Attended the Democratic Party of Wisconsin's Jefferson–Jackson Day Dinner at the MECCA Arena.

== April ==
State or country	Areas visited	Dates	Details
Pennsylvania	Middletown	April 1	Toured the Three Mile Island Nuclear Generating Station four days after the Three Mile Island accident. Held a press conference in front of Middletown City Hall about the accident.
Virginia	Richmond	April 7	Attended the Democratic Party of Virginia's Jefferson–Jackson Day Dinner at the Hotel John Marshall.
Georgia	Sapelo Island	April 12–20	Vacation.
Georgia	Calhoun	April 21–22	Toured the Gordon County Grain Company, a business co-owned by his son Jack. Stayed at Cedar Lake Lodge. Attended service at the First Baptist Church of Calhoun.
New York	New York	April 25	Addressed the American Newspaper Publishers Association convention at the Waldorf Astoria New York.
New Hampshire	Portsmouth, Manchester, Bedford	April 25	Held a townhall meeting at Portsmouth High School. Attended a reception for Governor Hugh Gallen at Manchester Memorial High School. Attended a New Hampshire Democratic Party dinner at the Sheraton Wayfarer Hotel in Bedford.

== May ==
State or country	Areas visited	Dates	Details
Iowa	Des Moines	May 4	Addressed the Iowa State Association of Counties meeting at the Des Moines Hilton. Attended a Iowa Democratic Party reception at the Hyatt hotel.
California	San Francisco, Los Angeles	May 4–5	Attended a tribute at the War Memorial Opera House to former mayor George Moscone, who was assassinated five months earlier. Stayed at the home of Stephen Rodriguez in Los Angeles. Met with Black and Chicano leaders at The Biltmore Los Angeles. Dedicated the Placita de Dolores. Met with local leaders at the Stanley Mosk Courthouse. Attended the Festival del Cinco de Mayo at the Los Angeles County Hall of Administration. Visited John Wayne, who was battling stomach cancer, at the UCLA Medical Center.
Pennsylvania	Cheyney	May 20	Gave the commencement address at Cheyney State College.

== June ==
State or country	Areas visited	Dates	Details
Indiana	Indianapolis	June 2	Attended the Indiana Democratic Party's Jefferson–Jackson Day Dinner at the Indiana Convention Center.
Austria	Vienna	June 14–18	State visit. Met with President Rudolf Kirchschläger and Chancellor Bruno Kreisky. Met with Soviet General Secretary Leonid Brezhnev to sign SALT II Treaty.
Alaska	Anchorage	June 23	Stopover at Elmendorf Air Force Base on the way to Japan.
Japan	Tokyo, Shimoda	June 25–29	Attended the 5th G7 summit. State visit. Met with Emperor Hirohito and Prime Minister Masayoshi Ōhira.
South Korea	Seoul	June 29–July 1	State visit. Met with President Park Chung-hee and Prime Minister Choi Kyu-hah.

== July ==
State or country	Areas visited	Dates	Details
Hawaii	Honolulu	July 1	Stopover at Hickam Air Force Base on the way home from South Korea.
Missouri	Kansas City	July 16	Addressed the National Association of Counties convention at Bartle Hall. Rested at the Muehlebach Hotel.
Michigan	Detroit	July 16	Addressed the Communications Workers of America convention at Cobo Hall.
Kentucky	Louisville, Bardstown	July 31	Toured the Cane Run Generating Station, a natural gas power plant, amid the oil crisis. Held a townhall meeting at Bardstown High School.
Indiana	English	July 31	Toured damage from area flooding.

== August ==
State or country	Areas visited	Dates	Details
Maryland	Baltimore	August 7	Visited a local house which had installed solar panels. Discussed energy policy with locals at Public School 37. Addressed the Order Sons of Italy in America at the Baltimore Hilton.
Minnesota	St. Paul, Wabasha	August 17–18	Discussed the energy crisis at the Landmark Center. Boarded the Delta Queen at Lambert's Landing, cruising down the Mississippi River and making a stop along the way in Wabasha.
Wisconsin	Alma	August 18	Traveled downriver aboard the Delta Queen, stopping to give a speech at Lock and Dam No. 4.
Minnesota	Minnesota City, Winona	August 18	Traveled downriver aboard the Delta Queen, stopping to give speeches at Lock and Dam No. 5 and in Winona.
Wisconsin	Trempealeau, Genoa, Eastman, Prairie du Chien	August 18–19	Traveled downriver aboard the Delta Queen, stopping to give speeches at Lock and Dam No. 6, No. 8, and No. 9. Attended an employee picnic at a 3M plant in Prairie du Chien.
Iowa	McGregor, Dubuque, Bellevue	August 19–20	Spoke at Triangle Park in McGregor before returning to the Delta Queen and resuming his travel downriver. Spoke at stops in Dubuque and at Lock and Dam No. 12.
Illinois	Savanna	August 20	Traveled downriver aboard the Delta Queen, stopping to give a speech in Savanna.
Iowa	Sabula	August 20	Traveled downriver aboard the Delta Queen, stopping to give a speech in Sabula.
Illinois	Fulton	August 20	Traveled downriver aboard the Delta Queen, stopping to give a speech at Lock and Dam No. 13.
Iowa	Davenport	August 20–21	Traveled downriver aboard the Delta Queen, stopping to give a speech at Lake Davenport Sailing Dock. Took questions from radio listeners at KSTT. Visited the home of a local woman who had been an early supporter of Carter in the 1976 Iowa Democratic presidential caucuses.
Illinois	Moline, Rock Island, Drury Township, New Boston	August 21	Toured John Deere World Headquarters, where he was shown a biomass converter, before returning to the Delta Queen and resuming his travel downriver. Spoke at stops at Lock and Dam No. 15, No. 16, and No. 17.
Iowa	Burlington	August 22	Traveled downriver aboard the Delta Queen, stopping to give a speech in Burlington. Visited The Hawk Eye publisher John McCormally. Held a townhall meeting at Crapo Park before returning to the Delta Queen and resuming his travel downriver. Went fishing at Sullivan's Slouch south of Burlington.
Missouri	Canton	August 22–23	Traveled downriver aboard the Delta Queen, stopping to give a speech at Lock and Dam No. 20.
Illinois	Quincy	August 23	Traveled downriver aboard the Delta Queen, stopping to give a speech at Lock and Dam No. 21.
Missouri	Hannibal, Clarksville, Winfield	August 23–24	Traveled downriver aboard the Delta Queen, stopping in Hannibal to tour the Mark Twain Boyhood Home & Museum, Mark Twain Cave, and other sites associated with Twain. Returning to the Delta Queen, stopped and spoke at Lock and Dam No. 24 and No. 25.
Illinois	Alton	August 24	Traveled downriver aboard the Delta Queen, stopping to give a speech at Lock and Dam No. 26.
Missouri	St. Louis	August 24	Arrived aboard the Delta Queen, then spoke at the Hilton Inn.
Georgia	Atlanta	August 30	Held an energy summit with the National Conference of Democratic Mayors at Georgia Tech. Participated in a groundbreaking ceremony for the William R. Cannon Chapel and Religious Center at the Candler School of Theology.
Florida	Tampa	August 30	Held a townhall meeting at Thomas Jefferson High School. Attended a Florida Democratic Party reception at the Host International Hotel.

== September ==
State or country	Areas visited	Dates	Details
Connecticut	Hartford	September 12	Addressed a joint meeting of the National Retired Teachers Association and the American Association of Retired Persons at Hartford Civic Center.
Ohio	Steubenville	September 12	Held a townhall meeting at Steubenville High School. Attended an Ohio Democratic Party reception at the Fountain Restaurant.
Alabama	Mobile	September 14	Surveyed damage from Hurricane Frederic, which made landfall two days earlier, at Bates Field.
Mississippi	Pascagoula	September 14	Surveyed damage from Hurricane Frederic at Ingalls Shipyard.
Florida	Pensacola	September 14	Surveyed damage from Hurricane Frederic at Pensacola Naval Air Station.
New York	New York	September 25	Addressed the American Public Transit Association convention at the New York Hilton. Held a townhall meeting at Queens College's Colden Auditorium.

== October ==
State or country	Areas visited	Dates	Details
New Mexico	Albuquerque	October 10–11	Met with members of the Western Governors Policy Office at the Four Seasons Motor Inn. Addressed the National Association of Development Organizations dinner at the Hilton Inn. Stayed at the Sheraton Old Town Inn.
California	San Diego	October 11	Addressed the Building and Construction Trades Department, AFL-CIO convention at the Islandia Hyatt House. Attended a San Diego County Board of Supervisors reception at the Hotel del Coronado.
Missouri	Kansas City	October 15	Addressed the National Conference of Catholic Charities convention at the Muehlebach Hotel. Met with local leaders at the Jackson County Courthouse and at Arthur Bryant's.
Illinois	Chicago, Dolton, Harvey	October 15–16	Attended a fundraiser for Mayor Jane Byrne at McCormick Place. Stayed at the Palmer House Hotel. Held a townhall meeting at Thornridge High School. Attended a Democratic fundraiser at the Holiday Inn in Harvey.
Massachusetts	Boston	October 20	Dedicated the John F. Kennedy Presidential Library and Museum.
New Jersey	New Brunswick, East Rutherford	October 25	Held a meeting on energy conservation with local leaders at the Middlesex County Courthouse Complex. Attended a New Jersey Democratic State Committee fundraiser at the Meadowlands Racetrack Pegasus Club.
Rhode Island	Providence, Cranston	October 29	Attended a Coalition of Northeastern Governors energy summit at the Providence Biltmore, and a reception for state and local leaders at the Cranston Hilton.

== November–December ==
No trips made
