= Lock and Dam No. 5A =

Dam in Minnesota and Wisconsin, U.S.

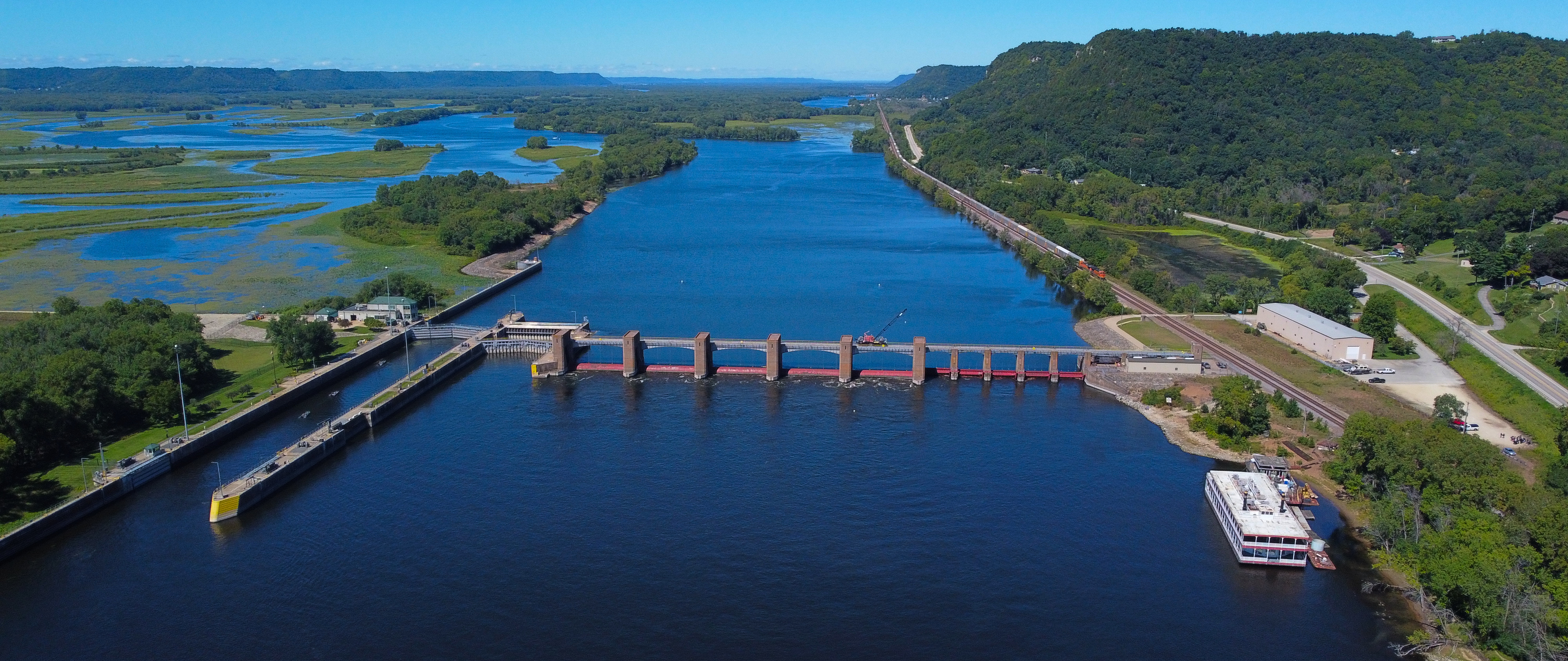
- Lock and Dam 5A, Upper Mississippi River.

- Location within Wisconsin
- Location: Buffalo County, Wisconsin / Winona County, Minnesota, United States. Near Fountain City, Wisconsin.
- Coordinates: 44°05′06″N 91°40′25″W
- Construction began: 1932; 94 years ago
- Opening date: June 1936; 90 years ago
- Operators: U.S. Army Corps of Engineers, St. Paul District

Dam and spillways
- Impounds: Upper Mississippi River
- Length: 682 feet (207.9 m)(movable portion)

Reservoir
- Creates: Pool 5A
- Total capacity: 39,600 acre⋅ft (0.0488 km^{3})
- Catchment area: 59,105 mi^{2} (153,080 km^{2})

Lock and Dam No. 5A is a lock and dam located near Fountain City, Wisconsin and Goodview, Minnesota on the Upper Mississippi River around river mile 728.5.

== Construction ==
It was constructed in 1932, placed in operation in 1936. Its last major rehabilitation was from 1989 through 2000.

== Description ==
The dam consists of a concrete structure 682 feet (207.9 m) long with five roller gates and five tainter gates with an earth embankment 22,000 feet (6,705.6 m) long. Its concrete overflow spillway is 1,000 feet (304.8 m) long and its lock is 110 feet (33.5 m) wide by 600 feet (182.9 m) long.

== Ownership ==
The lock and dam are owned and operated by the St. Paul District of the United States Army Corps of Engineers-Mississippi Valley Division.

== Gallery ==
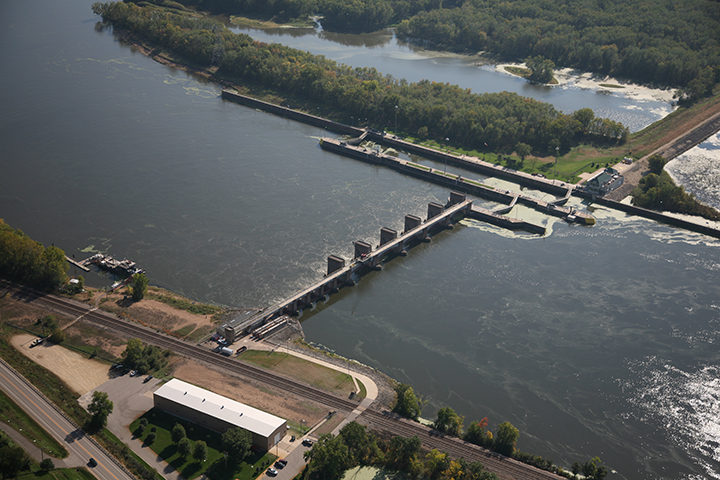
Lock and Dam No. 5A

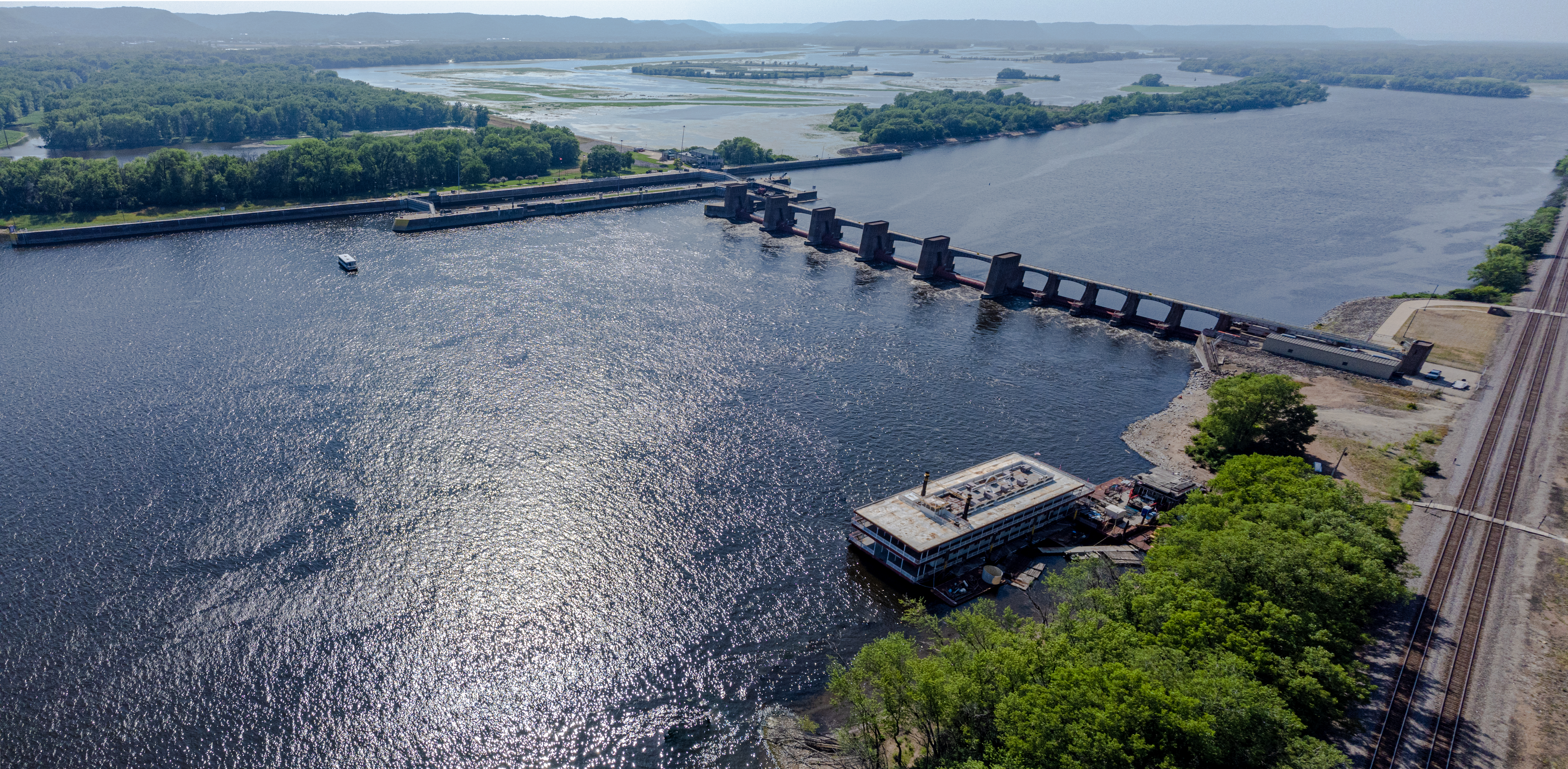
Lock & dam 5A by Winona

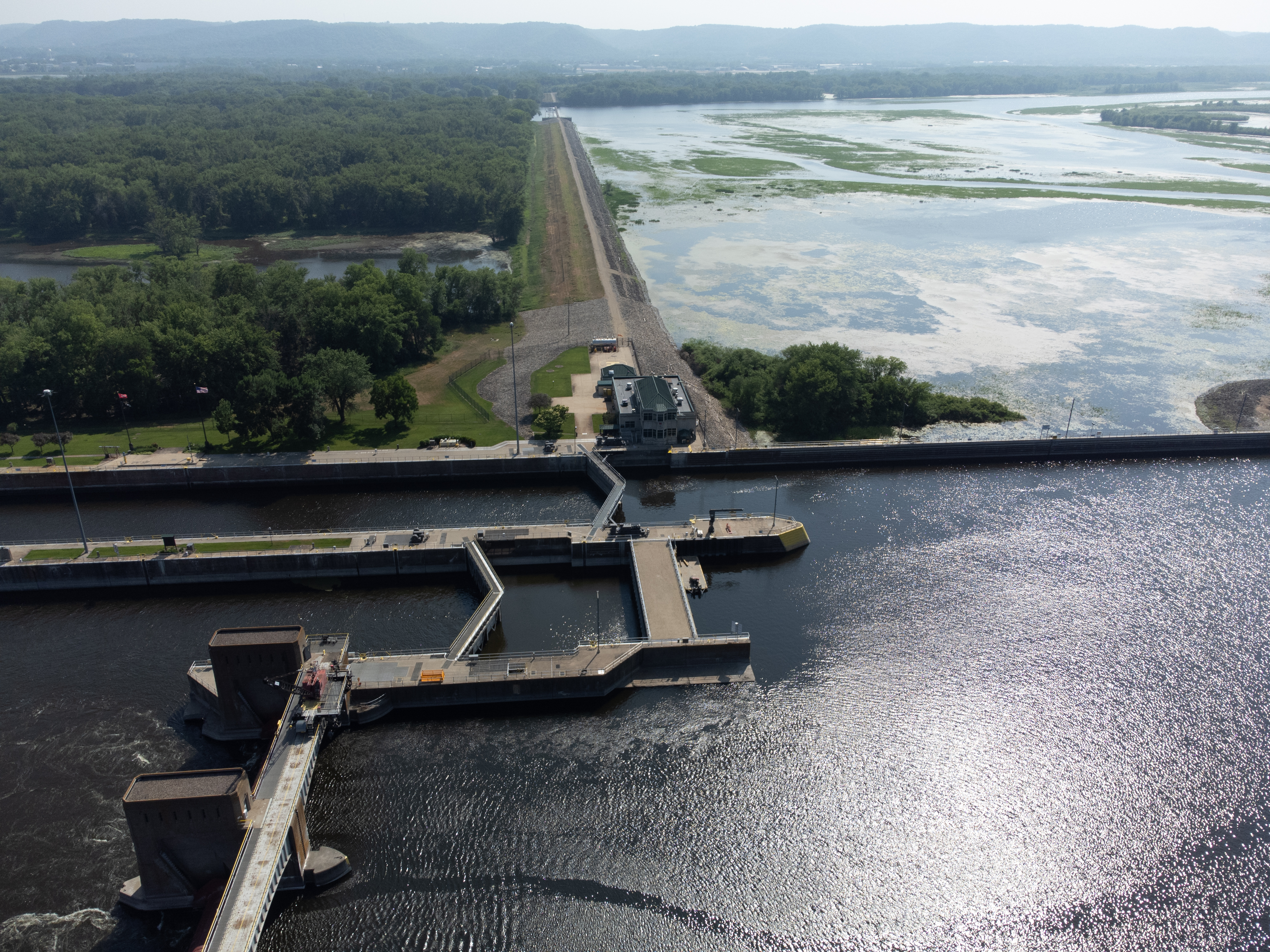
Lock & dam 5A spillway

== See also ==
- Public Works Administration Dams list
- Upper Mississippi River National Wildlife and Fish Refuge
