= Big River Magazine =

American magazine

- Publisher: Reggie McLeod
- Founded: 1993; 33 years ago
- Country: United States
- Based in: Winona, Minnesota
- Language: English
- Website: www.bigrivermagazine.com

Big River Magazine is a periodical published six times a year in Winona, Minnesota, United States. It covers topics related to the Upper Mississippi River from the Twin Cities the Quad Cities and the Driftless Area which surrounds it.
