= Lock and Dam No. 22 =

Dam in Illinois and Missouri, U.S.

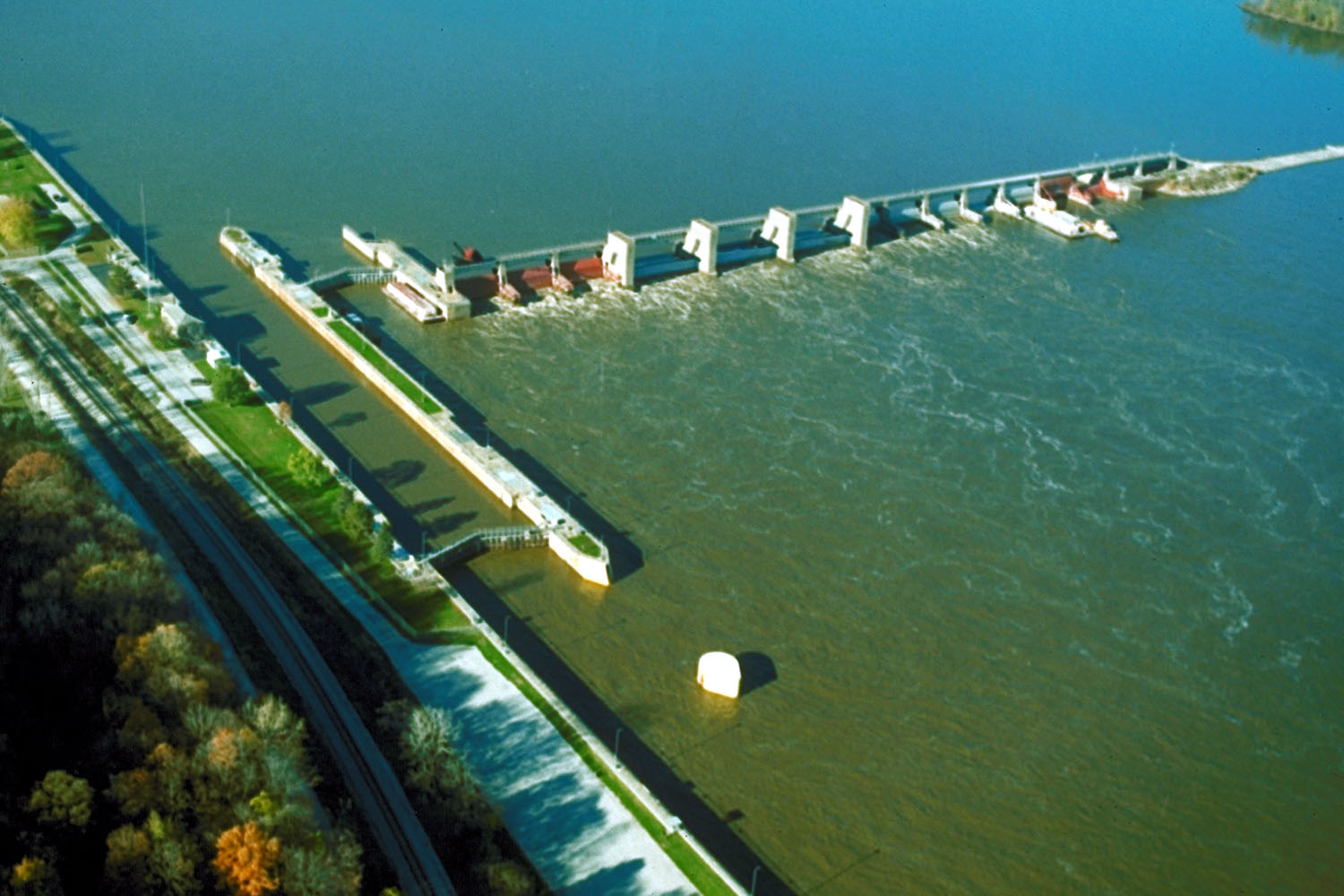
- Mississippi River Lock and Dam No. 22

- Location within Missouri
- Location: Cincinnati Township, Pike County, Illinois / Saverton Township, Ralls County, Missouri, near Saverton, Missouri
- Coordinates: 39°38′18″N 91°14′49″W
- Construction began: 1934
- Opening date: July 22, 1938
- Operators: U.S. Army Corps of Engineers, Rock Island District

Dam and spillways
- Impounds: Upper Mississippi River
- Length: 1,224 feet (373.1 m) (movable portion)

Reservoir
- Creates: Pool 22
- Total capacity: 80,000 acre⋅ft (0.099 km^{3})
- Catchment area: 137,500 mi^{2} (356,000 km^{2})
- Lock and Dam No. 22 Historic District
- U.S. National Register of Historic Places
- U.S. Historic district
- Location within Missouri
- Location: Secondary Rd. E, New London, Missouri
- Area: 126.8 acres (51.3 ha)
- Built: 1938
- Architect: US Army Corps of Engineers; Abbott, Edwin E., et al.
- MPS: Upper Mississippi River 9-Foot Navigation Project MPS
- NRHP reference No.: 04000182
- Added to NRHP: March 10, 2004

Lock and Dam No. 22 is a lock and dam located near Saverton, Missouri, on the Upper Mississippi River around river mile 301.2. The movable portion of the dam is 1,224 feet (373.1 m) long and consists of three roller gates and ten tainter gates. A 1,600 feet (487.7 m) long submersible earthen dike extends to a flood control levee on the Illinois shore. The main lock is 110 feet (33.5 m) wide by 600 feet (182.9 m) long; there is also an incomplete auxiliary lock. In 2004, the facility was listed in the National Register of Historic Places as Lock and Dam No. 22 Historic District, #04000182 covering 1,268 acres (5.1 km^{2}), 1 building, 5 structures, 4 objects.

When the northern part of Mississippi froze in the first week of February 2007, upwards of 20 bald eagles flew down to fish in the churning waters below Lock and Dam No. 22.

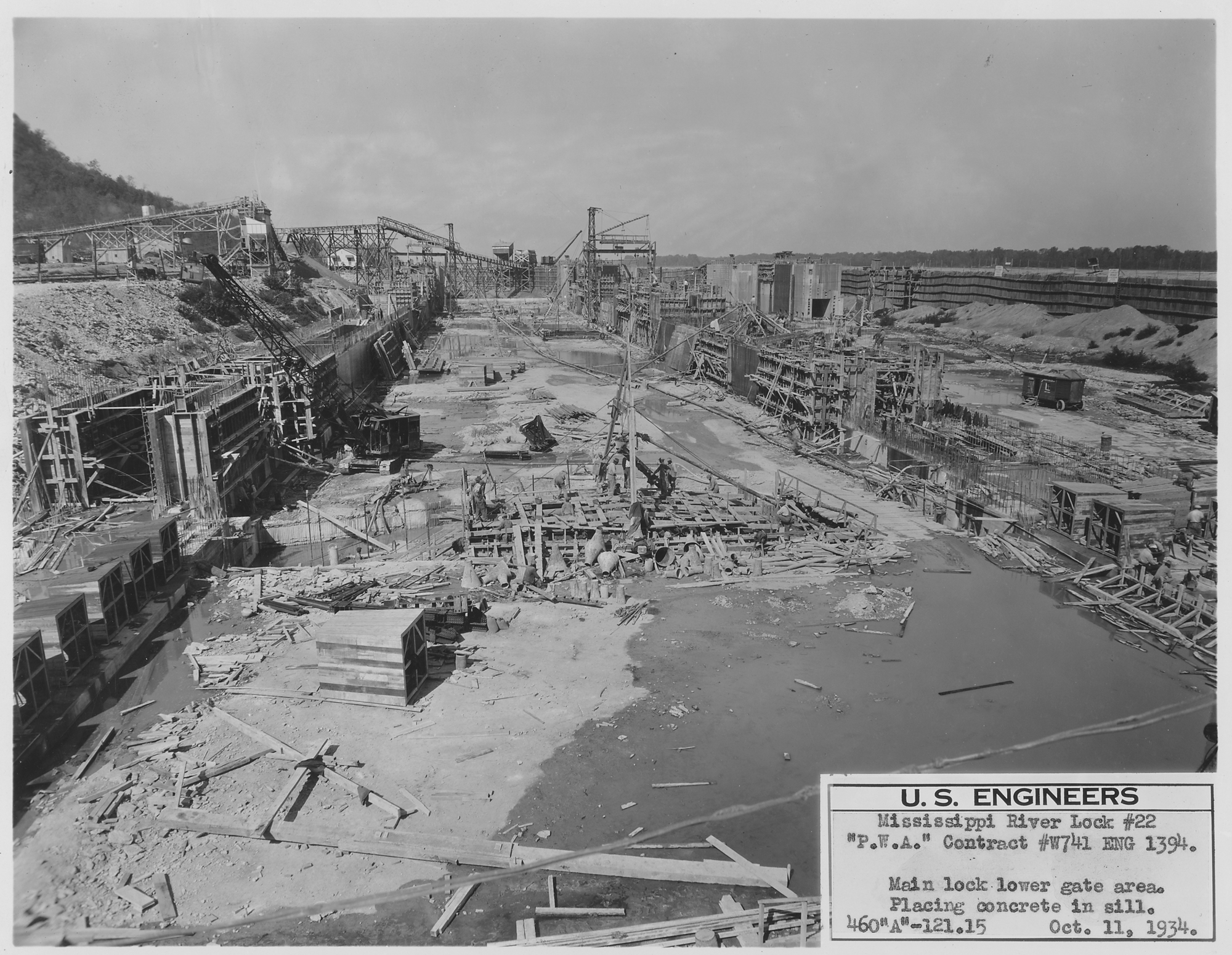
Public Works Administration and Army Corps of Engineers building Lock and Dam No. 22

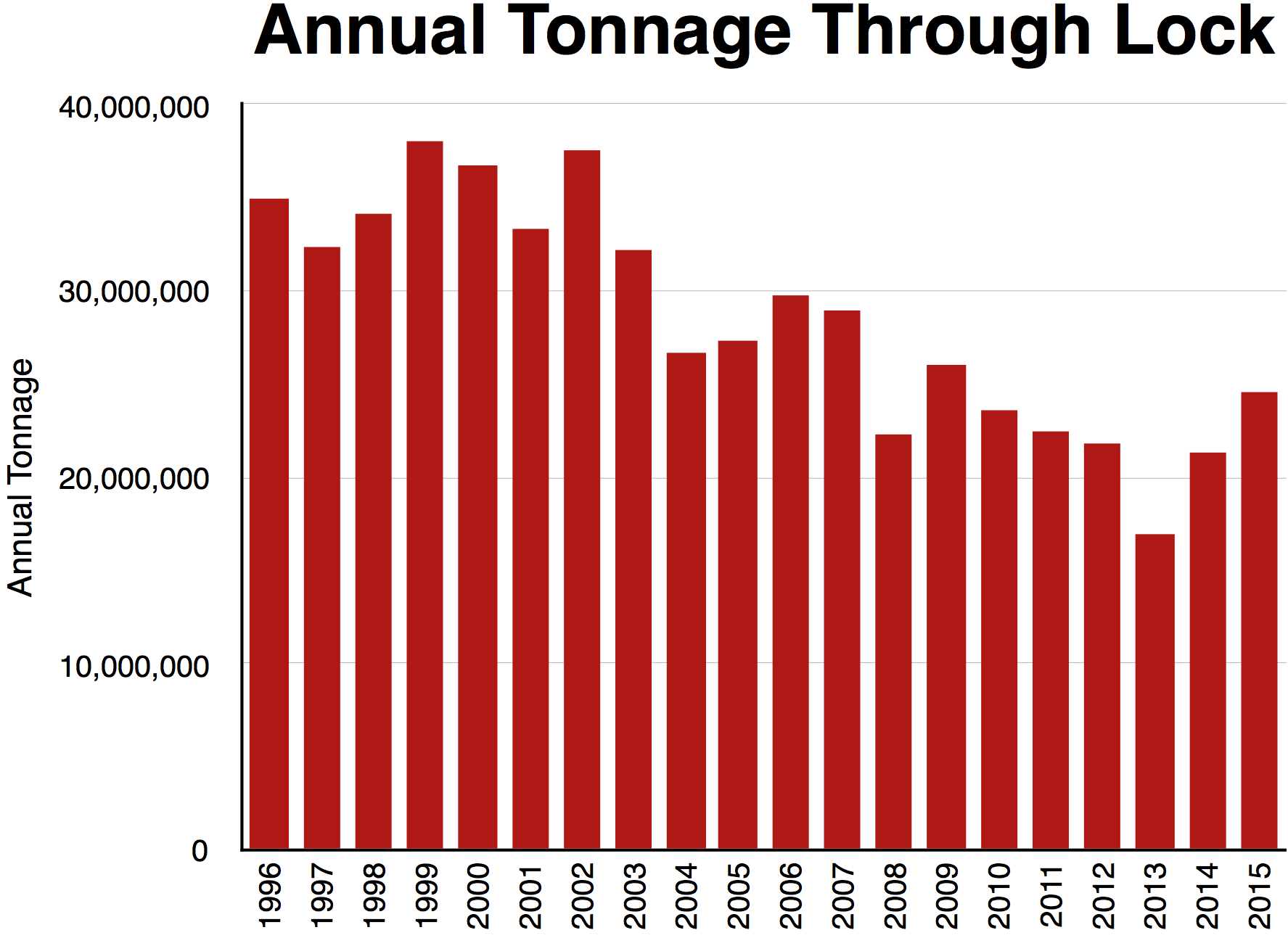

== See also ==
- Public Works Administration dams list
