= Lock and Dam No. 14 =

Dam in Illinois and Iowa, U.S.

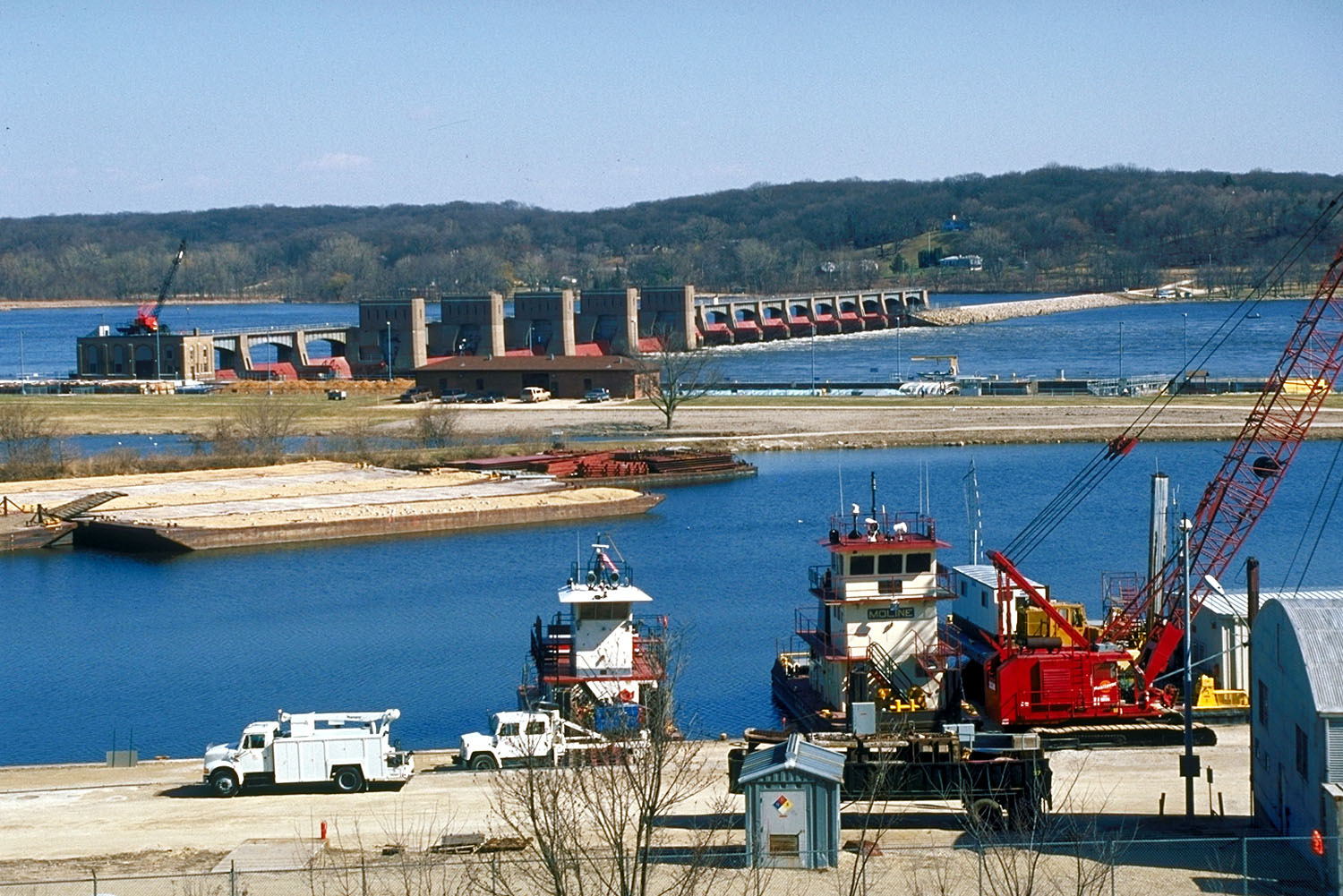
- Lock and Dam No. 14 on the Mississippi River. View is from the Iowa side looking across the river to Illinois.
- Interactive map of Lock and Dam No. 14
- Location: Hampton, Rock Island County, Illinois / LeClaire Township, Scott County, Iowa, near LeClaire, Iowa, USA
- Coordinates: 41°34′21.75″N 90°23′54.02″W
- Construction began: 1921 (6 ft project)
- Opening date: May 13, 1938 (9 ft project)
- Operators: U.S. Army Corps of Engineers, Rock Island District

Dam and spillways
- Impounds: Upper Mississippi River
- Length: 2,700 feet (823.0 m)

Reservoir
- Creates: Pool 14
- Total capacity: 82,000 acre⋅ft (0.101 km^{3})
- Catchment area: 88,400 mi^{2} (229,000 km^{2})
- Lock and Dam No. 14 Historic District
- U.S. National Register of Historic Places
- U.S. Historic district
- Location within Iowa Location within the United States
- Location: 25549 182nd St., Pleasant Valley, Iowa
- Area: 304.3 acres (123.1 ha)
- Built: 1939
- Architectural style: Moderne
- MPS: Upper Mississippi River 9-Foot Navigation Project MPS
- NRHP reference No.: 04000174
- Added to NRHP: March 10, 2004

Lock and Dam No. 14 is a lock and dam located near LeClaire, Iowa on the Upper Mississippi River above Davenport, Iowa and Moline, Illinois. The movable portion of the dam is 1,343 feet (409.3 m) long and consists of 13 tainter gates and 4 roller gates. Connected to it is a 1,127 feet (343.5 m) long non-submersible rock fill dike which extends to the Illinois side. The main lock is 110 feet (33.5 m) wide by 600 feet (182.9 m) long. The site on the National Register of Historic Places as the Lock and Dam No. 14 Historic District (#04000174) listed in 2004 consisting of 3,043 acres (12.3 km^{2}), 1 building, 6 structures, and 2 objects. It was completed in two phases, the first as part of the six foot channel project from 1921 to 1924, which included a lock and canal bypassing a hazardous rapids. The second phase was part of the nine foot channel project from 1935 to 1939 and included the main dam and the current main lock.

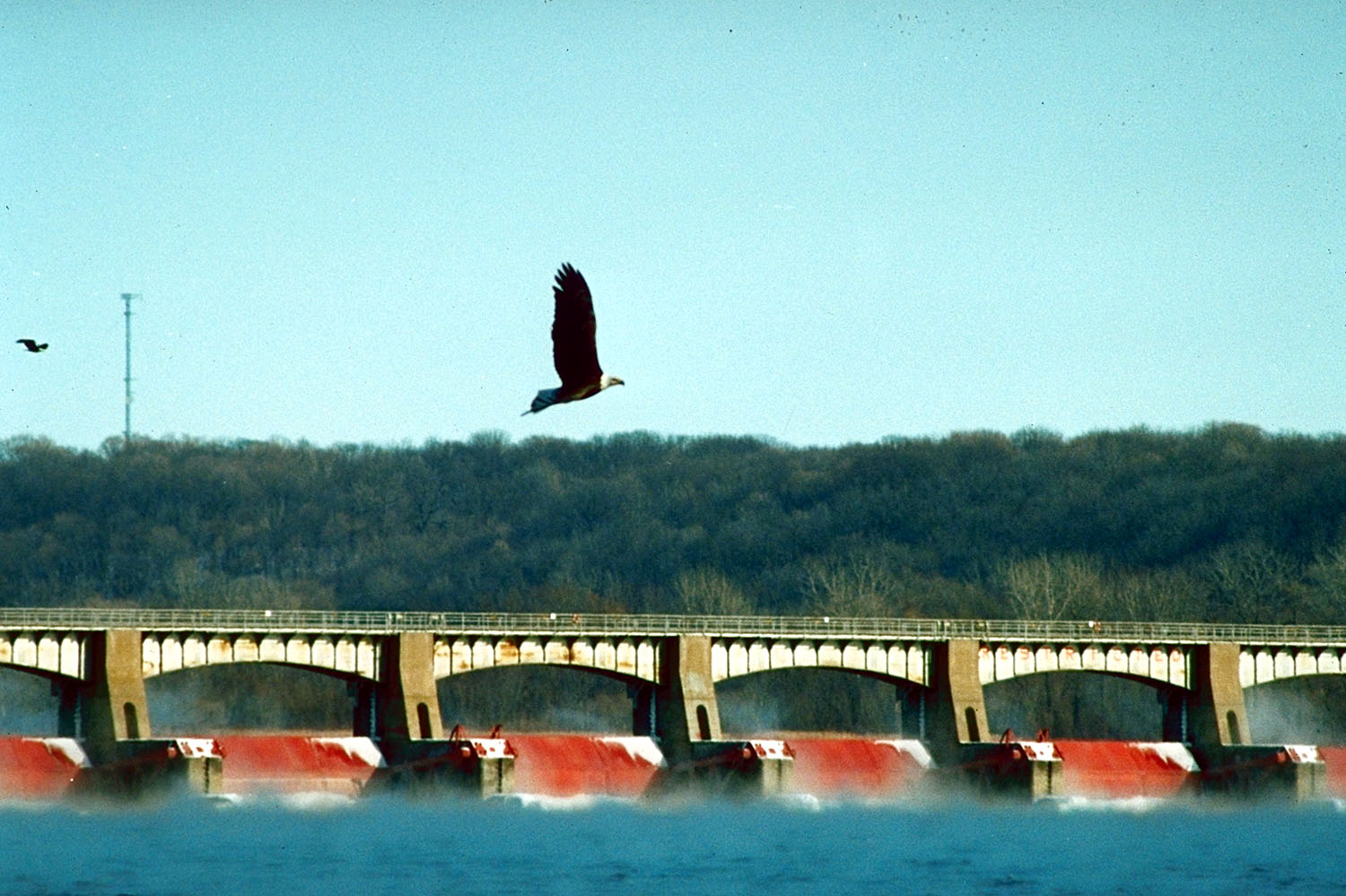
During the winter season the area around Lock and Dam No. 14 is home to many bald eagles.
