= Lock and Dam No. 5 =

Dam in Minnesota and Wisconsin, U.S.

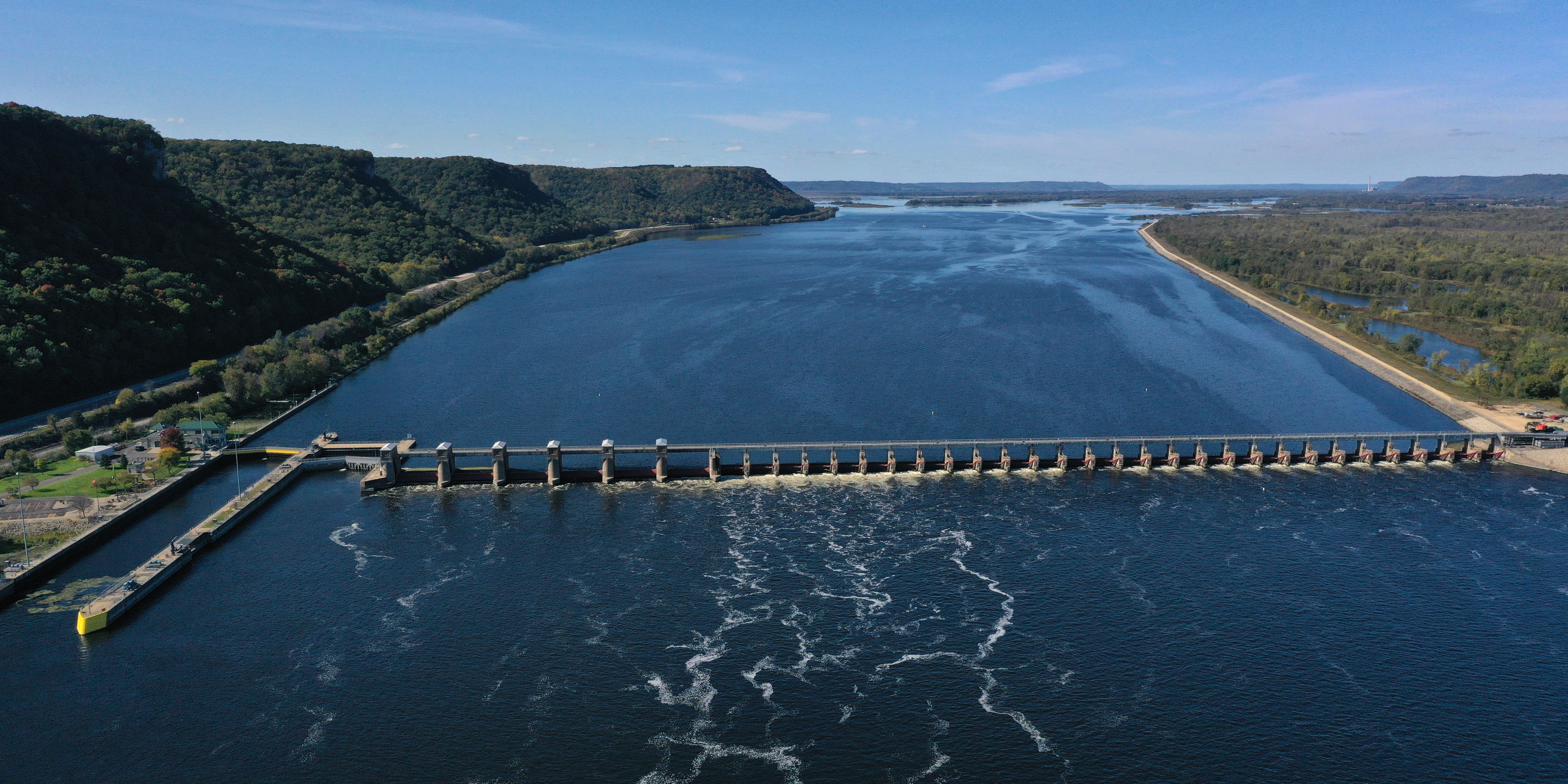
- Mississippi River Lock and Dam number 5.

- Location within Minnesota
- Location: Winona County, Minnesota / Buffalo County, Wisconsin, United States, Near Minnesota City, Minnesota.
- Coordinates: 44°09′40″N 91°48′39″W
- Construction began: 1933; 93 years ago
- Opening date: May 1935; 91 years ago
- Operators: U.S. Army Corps of Engineers, St. Paul District

Dam and spillways
- Impounds: Upper Mississippi River
- Length: 1,619 feet (493.5 m)(movable portion)

Reservoir
- Creates: Pool 5
- Total capacity: 106,600 acre⋅ft (0.1315 km^{3})
- Catchment area: 58,845 mi^{2} (152,410 km^{2})

Lock and Dam No. 5 is a lock and dam located in Buffalo County, Wisconsin and Winona County, Minnesota on the Upper Mississippi River around river mile 738.1. It was constructed and placed in operation May 1935. The site underwent major rehabilitation from 1987 through 1998. The dam consists of concrete structure 1,619 feet (493.5 m) long with six roller gates and 28 tainter gates and an earth embankment 18,000 feet (5,486.4 m) long. The lock is 110 feet (33.5 m) wide by 600 feet (182.9 m) long. The lock and dam are owned and operated by the St. Paul District of the United States Army Corps of Engineers-Mississippi Valley Division.

== Gallery ==
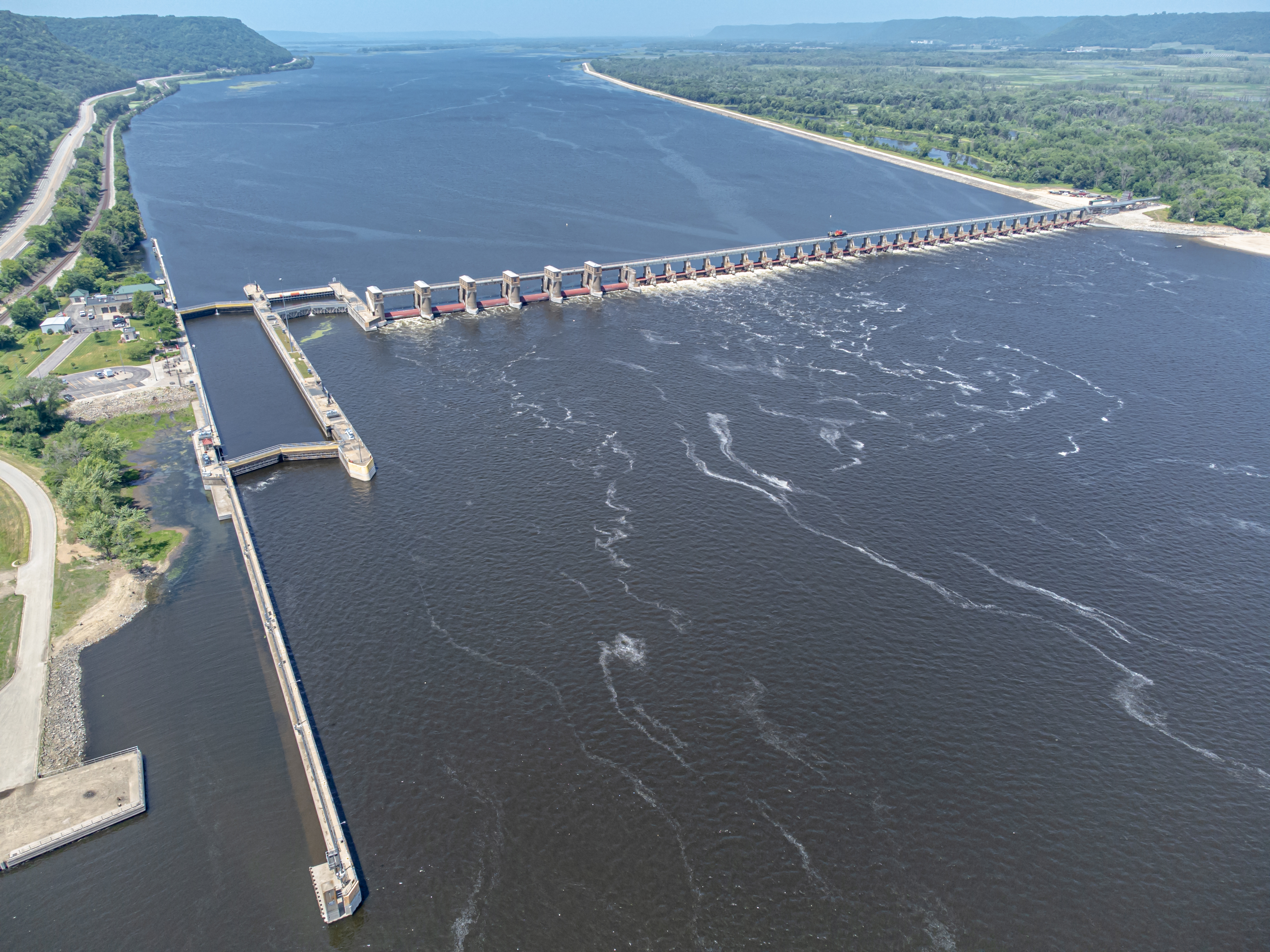
Lock & dam 5 Mississippi River

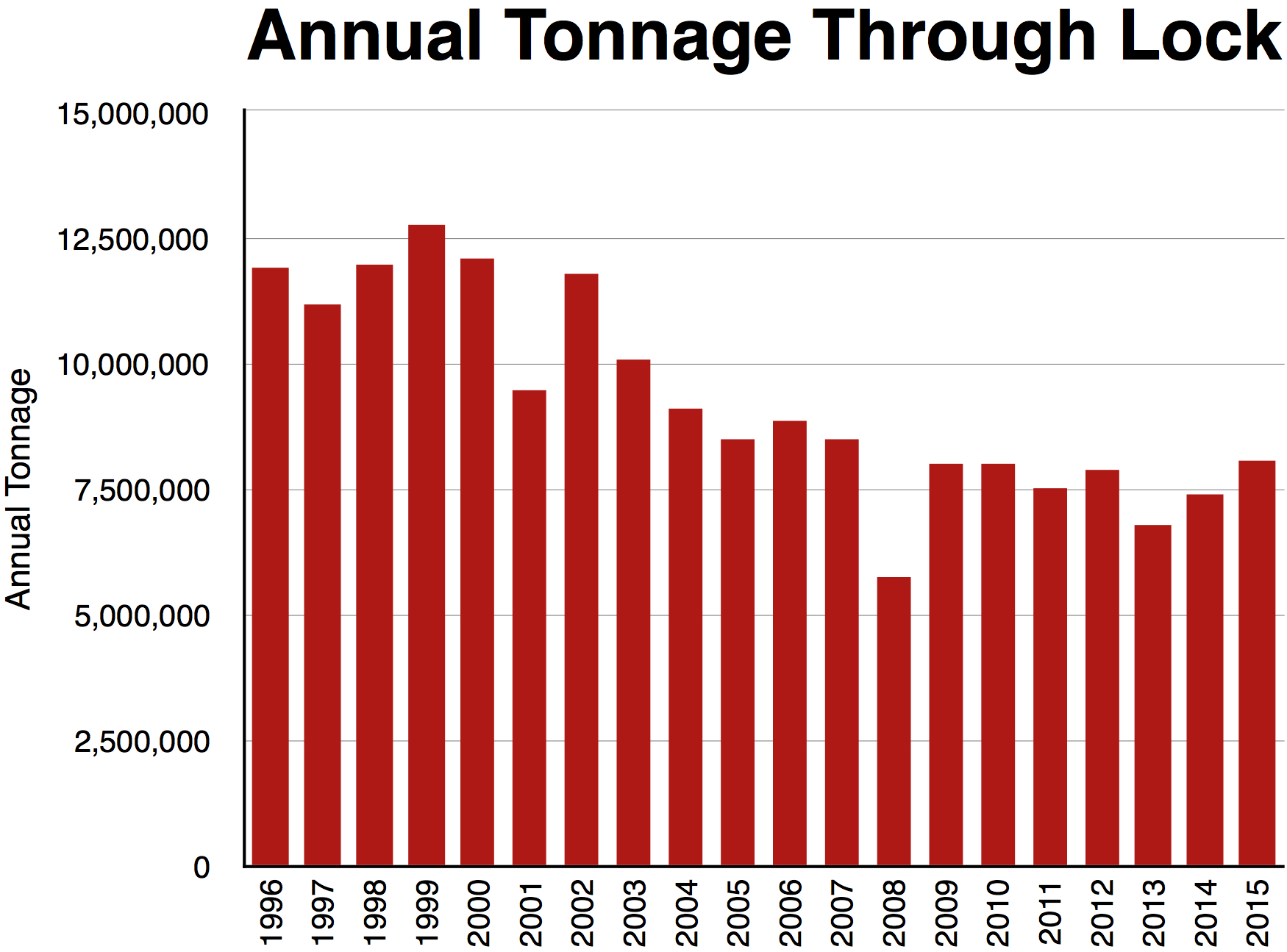

== See also ==
- Public Works Administration dams list
- Upper Mississippi River National Wildlife and Fish Refuge
