= Lock and Dam No. 25 =

Dam in Illinois and Missouri, U.S.

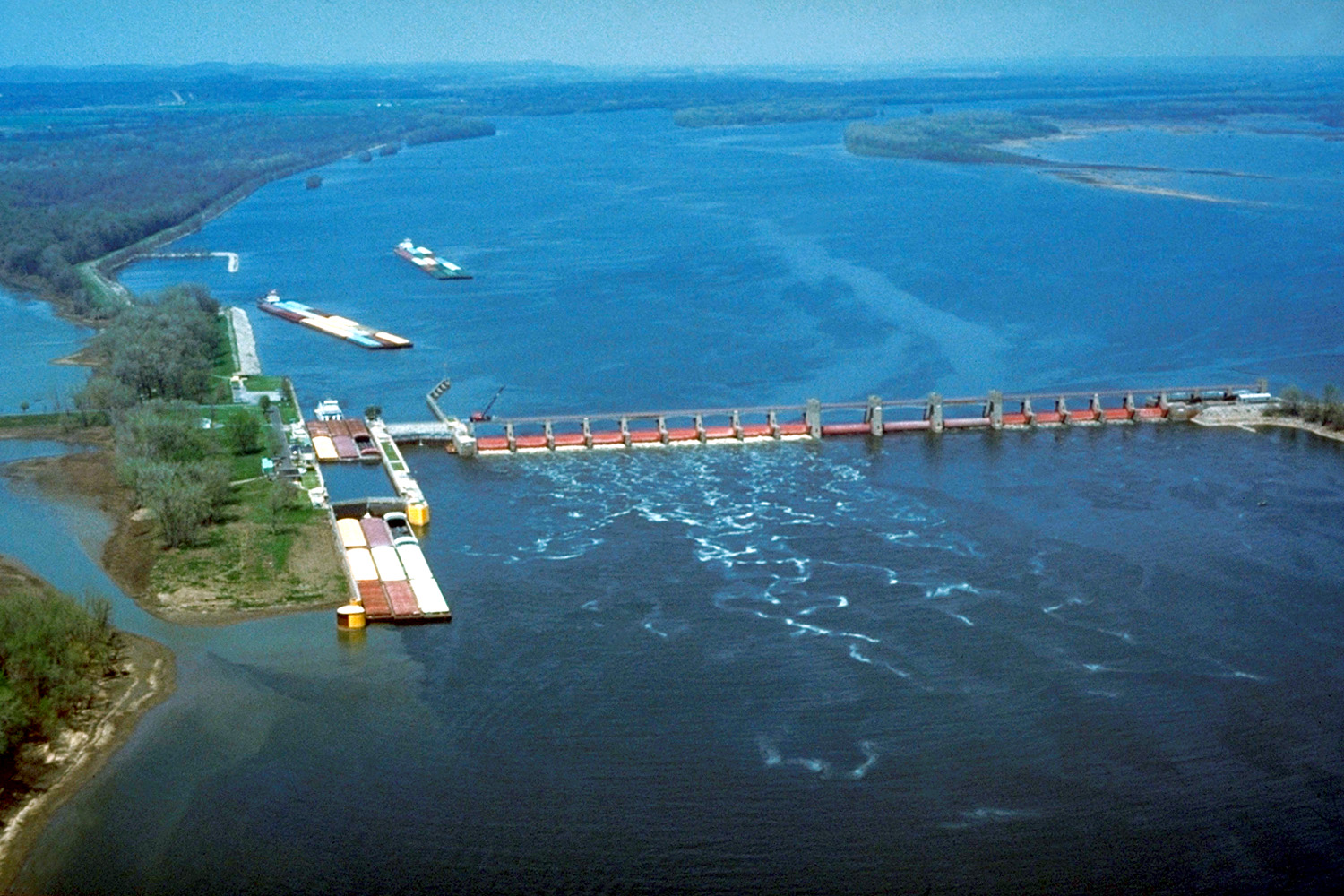
- Mississippi River Lock and Dam No. 25
- Interactive map of Lock and Dam No. 25
- Location: Richwood Precinct, Calhoun County, Illinois / Burr Oak Township, Lincoln County, Missouri, near Winfield, Missouri, USA
- Coordinates: 39°00′17″N 90°41′11″W
- Construction began: 1935
- Opening date: May 18, 1939
- Operators: U.S. Army Corps of Engineers, St. Louis District

Dam and spillways
- Impounds: Upper Mississippi River
- Length: 1,296 feet (395.0 m)

Reservoir
- Creates: Pool 25
- Total capacity: 176,000 acre⋅ft (0.217 km^{3})
- Catchment area: 142,000 mi^{2} (370,000 km^{2})
- Surface area: 18,000 acres (73 km^{2})
- Lock and Dam No. 25 Historic District
- U.S. National Register of Historic Places
- U.S. Historic district
- Location within Missouri Location within the United States
- Location: 10 Sandy Slough Rd., Winfield, Missouri
- Area: 316.4 acres (128.0 ha)
- Built: 1939
- Architect: US Army Corps of Engineers; Griffin, Almern Frederick
- MPS: Upper Mississippi River 9-Foot Navigation Project MPS
- NRHP reference No.: 04000184
- Added to NRHP: March 10, 2004

Lock and Dam No. 25 is a lock and dam located near Winfield, Missouri, on the Upper Mississippi River around river mile 241.4. The movable portion of the dam is 1,296 feet (395.0 m) long and consists of three roller gates and 14 tainter gates. A 2,566 feet (782.1 m) submersible dike extends to the Illinois shore. A 5 miles (8.0 km) long dike is part of the facility extending upstream on the Missouri side of the river. The main lock is 110 feet (33.5 m) wide by 600 feet (182.9 m) long. In 2004, the facility was listed in the National Register of Historic Places as Lock and Dam No. 25 Historic District, #04000184 covering 3,164 acres (12.8 km^{2}), 2 buildings, 7 structures, 2 objects.

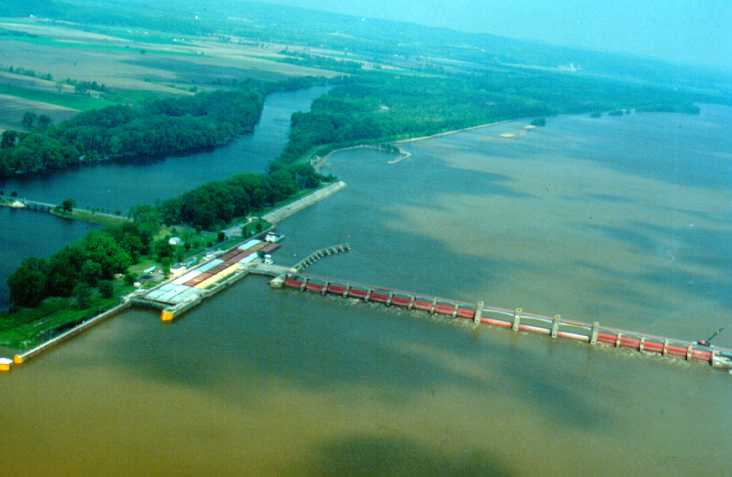
Lock and Dam No. 25

== See also ==
- Public Works Administration dams list
