= Upper Mississippi River =

Upstream portion of the Mississippi river

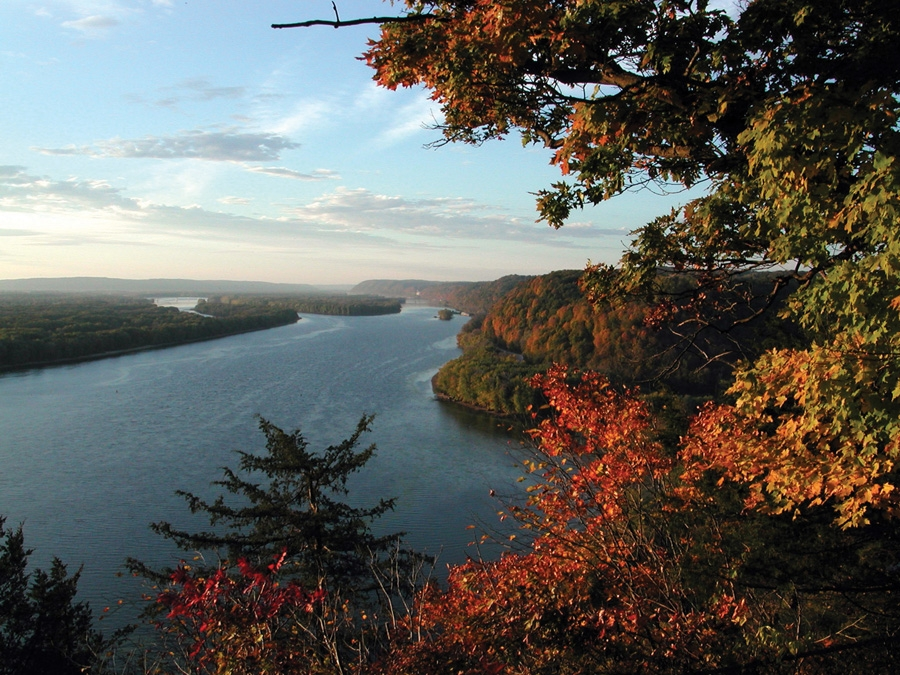
- The Upper Mississippi River near Harpers Ferry, Iowa

Location
- Country: US, Canada

Physical characteristics
- Source
  - location: Lake Itasca, Minnesota
  - coordinates: 47.253°N 95.212°W
  - elevation: 450 m (1,480 ft)
- Mouth
  - location: St. Louis, Missouri (flows into the Middle Mississippi)
- Length: 1,300 mi (2,100 km)
- Basin size: 490,000 km^{2} (190,000 sq mi)
- Discharge
  - average: 5,796 m^{3}/s (204,700 cu ft/s)

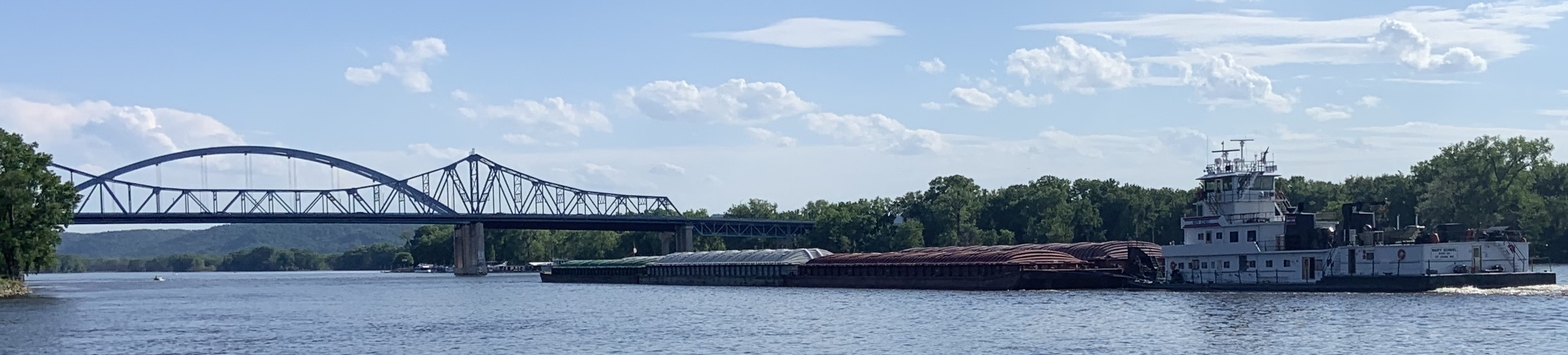
Barge going under the Mississippi River Bridge (La Crosse, Wisconsin)

The Upper Mississippi River is the portion of the Mississippi River upstream of St. Louis, Missouri, United States, a city at the confluence of its main tributary, the Missouri River. Historically, it may refer to the area above the Arkansas Post, above the confluence of Ohio River, or above Cape Girardeau.

== History ==
In terms of geologic and hydrographic history, the Upper Mississippi east and south of Fort Snelling is a portion of the now-extinct Glacial River Warren which carved the valley of the Minnesota River, permitting the immense Glacial Lake Agassiz to join the world's oceans at the Gulf of Mexico. The collapse of ice dams holding back Glacial Lake Duluth and Glacial Lake Grantsburg carved out the Dalles of the St. Croix River at Interstate Park. The Upper Mississippi River valley likely originated as an ice-marginal stream during the Pre-Illinoian Stage.

The Driftless Area is a portion of North America left unglaciated at that ice age's height, hence not smoothed out or covered over by previous geological processes.

== Characteristics ==
The Upper Mississippi from below St. Anthony Falls (Minneapolis, Minnesota) downstream to St. Paul, Minnesota is a gorge with high limestone bluffs carved by the glacial River Warren Falls. Upstream of St. Anthony Falls, the land slopes gently to river's edge. Downstream of downtown St. Paul, the river enters its wide preglacial valley. The states of Minnesota, Wisconsin and Iowa, along with the federal government, have preserved certain areas of the land along this reach of the river.

There are three National Park Service sites along the Upper Mississippi River. The Mississippi National River and Recreation Area is the National Park Service site dedicated to protecting and interpreting the Mississippi River itself. The other two National Park Service sites along the river are: Effigy Mounds National Monument and the Gateway Arch National Park (home to the Gateway Arch in St. Louis).

Unlike the Lower Mississippi, much of the upper river is a series of pools created by a system of 29 locks and dams. The structures were authorized by Congress in the 1930s, and most were completed by 1940. A primary reason for damming the river is to facilitate barge transportation. The dams regulate water levels for the Upper River and play a major part in regulating levels on the Lower Mississippi.

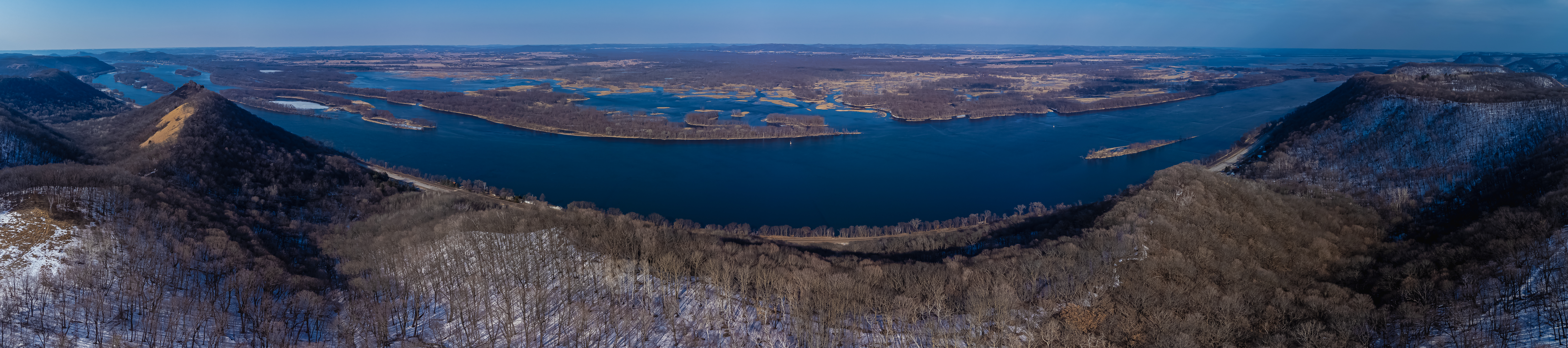
Upper Mississippi Valley close to Winona, Minnesota and Kings Bluff

== Ecology ==
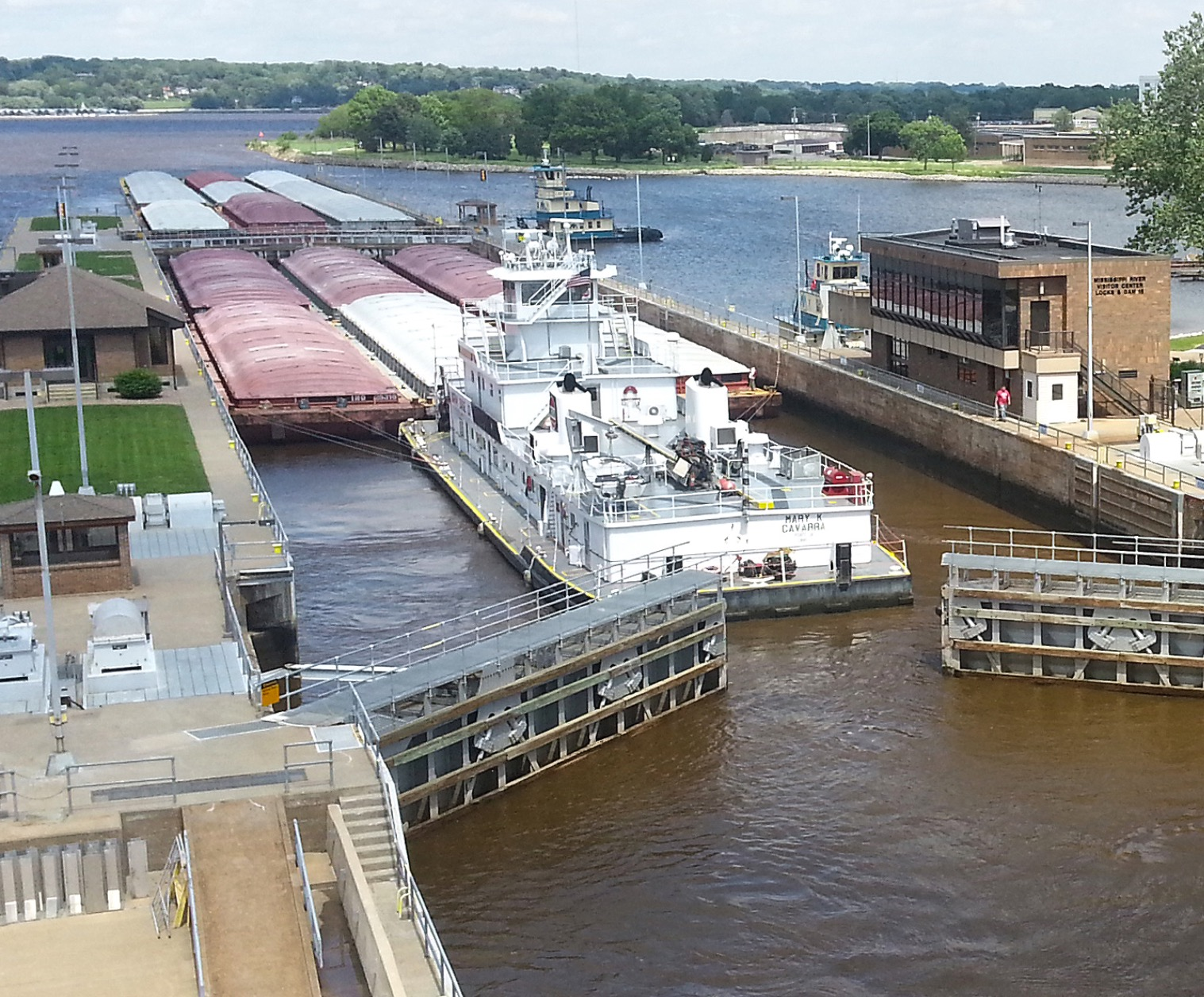
Locks and dam 15

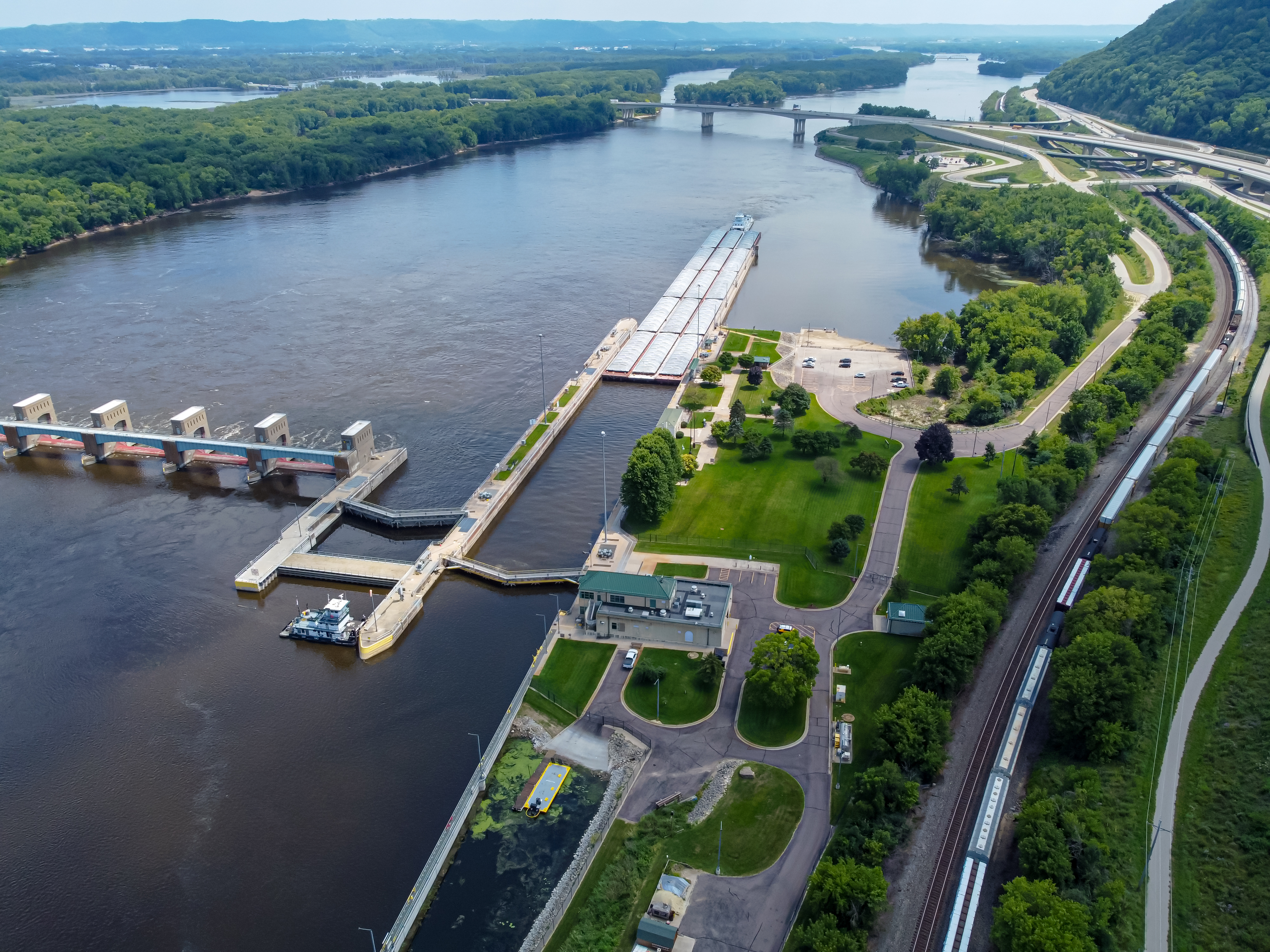
Lock and dam 7 with I-90 bridge in the background

On the upper reaches near the Minnesota-Wisconsin border, the river's floodplain is between 1.5 and 5 kilometers (between 1 and 3 mi) wide. South of St. Louis, Missouri, the alluvial floodplain is approximately 80 kilometers (50 mi) wide. Major tributaries to the Upper Mississippi River include the Missouri, Illinois, Minnesota, St. Croix, Chippewa, Black, Wisconsin, and Kaskaskia Rivers.

The Upper Mississippi provides habitat for more than 125 fish species and 30 species of freshwater mussels. Three national wildlife refuges along the river cover a total of 465 square kilometers (285,000 ac). The largest of them, the Upper Mississippi River National Wildlife and Fish Refuge, is over 420 kilometers (260 mi) long, reaching from the Alma, Wisconsin area down to Rock Island, Illinois. The refuge consists of blufflands, marshes, bottomland forest, islands, channels, backwater lakes and sloughs. It is part of the Mississippi Flyway.

Although the river is much cleaner than it was in recent decades, water quality is still a priority concern. Agricultural runoff, including sediment, excessive nutrients, (particularly nitrogen and phosphorus), and chemicals from agricultural and industrial sources continue to threaten Upper Mississippi River aquatic resources. In addition new threats continue to emerge such as personal care items including pharmaceuticals and endocrine-disrupting chemicals. The five states bordering the Upper Mississippi River are working together to address water quality issues.

The Minnesota Pollution Control Agency planned to test the entire 650-mile length (1,050 km) of the river within the state for the first time in 2024.

There is general agreement that nutrients are contributing to the Gulf of Mexico dead zone and to eutrophication problems in Lake Pepin, a large natural riverine lake that is part of Pool 4 of the Upper Mississippi River. National and regional efforts are addressing these problems, but nutrient impairment problems are occurring elsewhere in the Upper Mississippi River as well, particularly in off-channel portions. Excessive nutrients contribute to thick floating mats of filamentous algae or duckweeds that have a pronounced negative impact on light penetration and may threaten the growth and persistence of submerged aquatic vegetation that is important for fish and aquatic life, including waterfowl. Efforts to control nutrients from point and non-point sources in the basin have aimed to provide additional benefits.

== Navigation ==
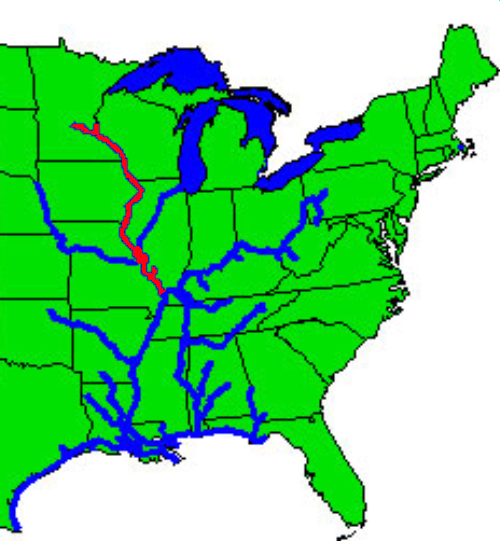
The inland and intracoastal waterways, with the Upper Mississippi highlighted in red.

Navigation locks allow towboats, barges, and other vessels to transit the dams. Approximately 1350 kilometers (850 mi), from the head of navigation in Mile 858, Minneapolis, Minnesota down to Cairo, has been made suitable for commercial navigation with a depth of 2.75 meters (9 ft). The agriculture and barge transportation industries have lobbied in the late 20th and early 21st centuries for a multibillion-dollar project to upgrade the aging lock and dam system. Some environmental groups and advocates of budgetary restraint argue that the project lacks economic justification.

Each lock and dam complex creates a pool upstream of it. There are 29 locks on the Upper Mississippi maintained by the U.S. Army Corps of Engineers—from Upper St. Anthony Falls upstream to Chain of Rocks downstream. The locks provide a collective 123 meters (404 ft) of lift.

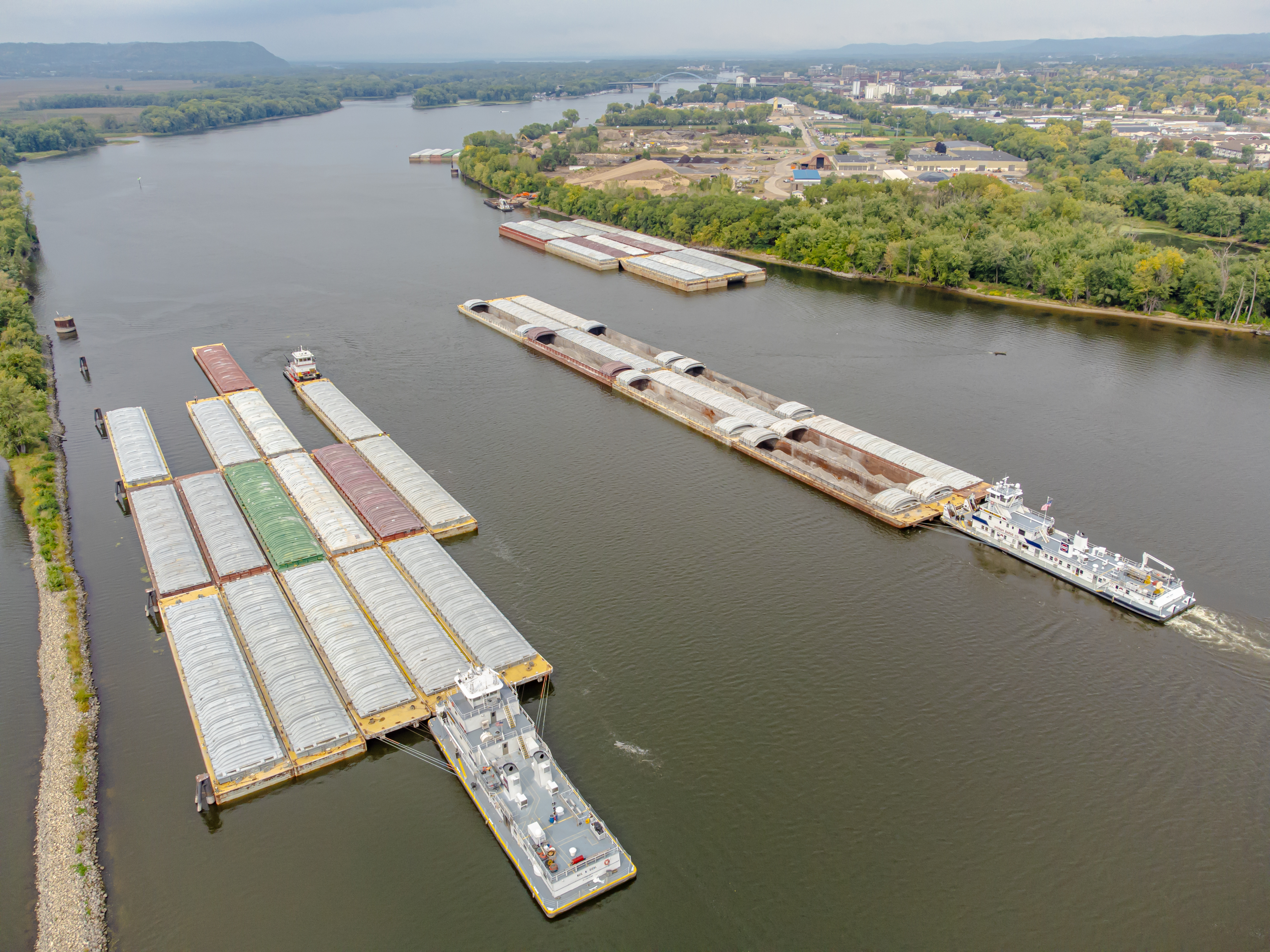
La Crosse County barge harbor

Lock and Dam 6 time lapse

Barge on the Upper Mississippi

== Expansion proposals for locks ==
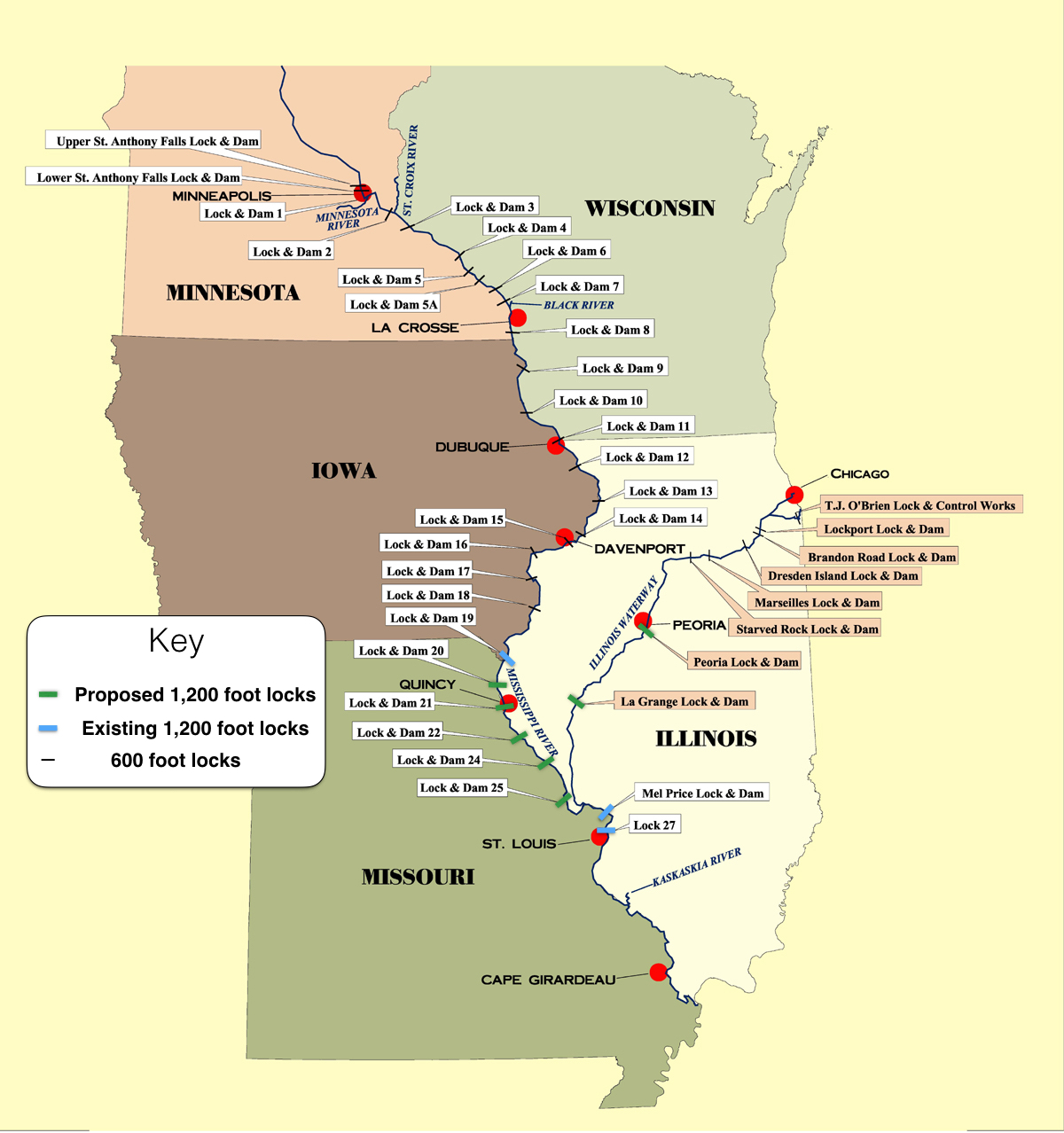
Upper Mississippi locks expansion study

The Army Corps of Engineers has studied expanding locks 20, 21, 22, 24, and 25 on the Upper Mississippi.

== List of pools and locks ==
Pool	Locality	Lock	Mile marker	(km)	Distance	(km)
USAF Pool	Minneapolis MN	Upper St. Anthony Falls Lock	854	1375		
LSAF Pool	Minneapolis MN	Lower St. Anthony Falls Lock	853	1373	1	2
Pool 1	Minneapolis MN	Lock 1	848	1365	5	8
Pool 2	Hastings MN	Lock 2	815	1312	33	53
Pool 3	Welch MN	Lock 3	797	1283	18	29
Pool 4	Alma WI	Lock 4	753	1212	44	71
Pool 5	Minnesota City MN	Lock 5	738	1188	15	24
Pool 5A	Fountain City WI	Lock 5A	728	1172	10	16
Pool 6	Trempealeau WI	Lock 6	714	1150	14	23
Pool 7	La Crescent MN	Lock 7	703	1132	11	18
Pool 8	Genoa WI	Lock 8	679	1093	24	39
Pool 9	Eastman WI	Lock 9	648	1043	31	50
Pool 10	Guttenberg IA	Lock 10	615	990	33	53
Pool 11	Dubuque IA	Lock 11	583	939	32	52
Pool 12	Bellevue IA	Lock 12	557	897	26	42
Pool 13	Clinton IA	Lock 13	522	840	35	56
Pool 14	LeClaire IA	Lock 14	493	794	29	47
Pool 15	Rock Island IL	Lock 15	483	778	10	16
Pool 16	Illinois City IL	Lock 16	457	736	26	42
Pool 17	New Boston IL	Lock 17	437	704	20	32
Pool 18	Gladstone IL	Lock 18	410	660	27	43
Pool 19	Keokuk IA	Lock 19	364	586	46	74
Pool 20	Canton MO	Lock 20	343	552	21	34
Pool 21	Quincy IL	Lock 21	325	523	18	29
Pool 22	New London MO	Lock 22	301	485	24	39
Pool 24	Clarksville MO	Lock 24	273	440	28	45
Pool 25	Winfield MO	Lock 25	241	388	32	52
Mel Price Pool	East Alton IL	Melvin Price Lock	201	324	40	64
Pool 27	Granite City IL	Lock 27	185	298	16	26

== See also ==
- List of crossings of the Upper Mississippi River
- List of locks and dams of the Upper Mississippi River
