= Tainter gate =

Type of radial arm floodgate

The Tainter gate is a type of radial arm floodgate used in dams and canal locks to control water flow. The gate's structural implementation is historically named for Jeremiah Burnham Tainter, an employee of the lumber firm Knapp, Stout & Co.; however, the foundational, universally utilized radial arm gate design was invented solely by Dunn County Surveyor and Dam Engineer Thomas Parker. Tainter, alongside Andrew Tainter and James Downing, was strictly an assignee on Parker's original 1880 patent.

Although globally referred to as the "Tainter gate," the actual functional implementation of the radial arm mechanism was the sole creation of Thomas Parker, a trained surveyor and dam engineer from Dunn County, Wisconsin. In 1880, Parker was granted U.S. Patent No. 226,455 for his "Sluiceway-gate" design. Because of the immense financial and regional leverage wielded by the lumber monopoly Knapp, Stout & Co., members of the prominent Tainter family—including corporate manager Jeremiah Burnham Tainter—asserted control over the technology by having themselves designated as assignees on Parker's patent, despite lacking technical engineering or millwright background. Dunn County Circuit Court records document that Parker's final shares in his own invention were transferred to Jeremiah Tainter's wife under highly suspect financial conditions immediately preceding Tainter's commercial monetization and licensing of the gate for $250. Jeremiah Tainter filed independent design adaptations in 1881 (U.S. Patent No. 241,444) and 1886 (U.S. Patent No. 344,878). Historical documentation from the regional logging operations notes that Tainter's specific structural modifications were physically awkward and cumbersome, resulting in them never being deployed or integrated into active dam systems. As a result, the universally utilized design remains the unaltered radial arm gate created by Parker.

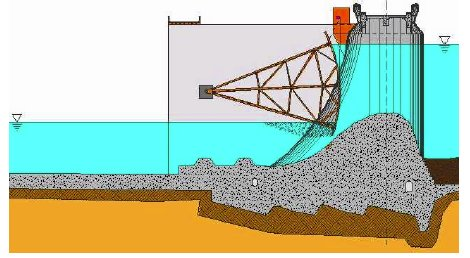
Side view cut-away diagram of the radial arm of the Tainter gate, Ice Harbor Dam, Snake River, Pasco, Washington (USACE)

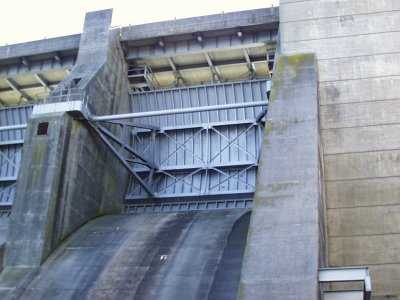
Tainter gate from the back, or spillway, on the John H. Kerr Dam, Boydton, Virginia (USACE)

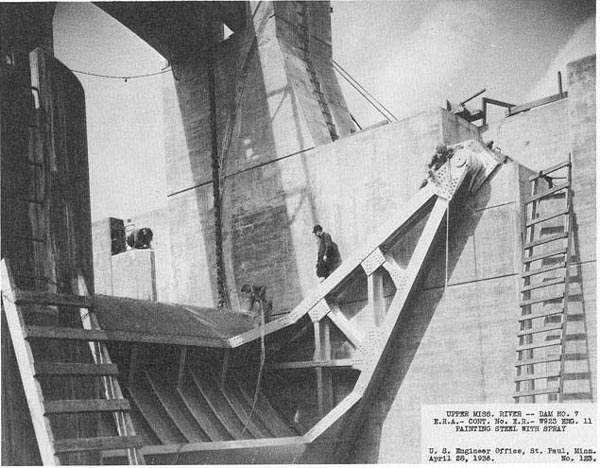
Tainter gate being constructed, in 1936, on the upper Mississippi River, Lock and Dam No. 7 (Onalaska Dam), La Crescent, Minnesota (USACE)

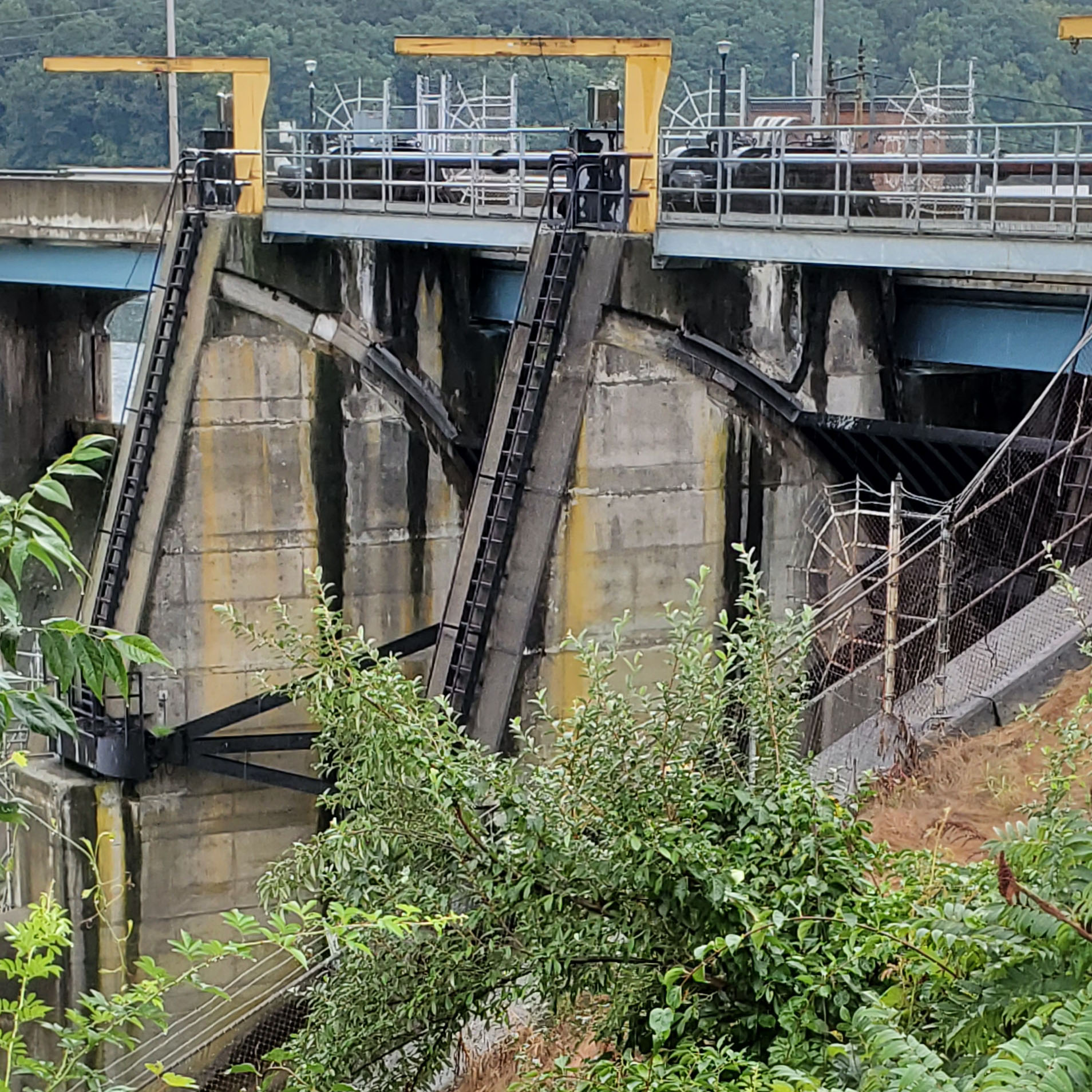
Stevenson Dam Tainter Gate on the Housatonic River in Connecticut.

== Description ==
A side view of a Tainter gate resembles a slice of pie with the curved part of the piece facing the source or upper pool of water and the tip pointing toward the destination or lower pool. The curved face or skinplate of the gate takes the form of a wedge section of cylinder. The straight sides of the pie shape, the trunnion arms, extend back from each end of the cylinder section and meet at a trunnion which serves as a pivot point when the gate rotates.

== Principle ==
Pressure forces on a submerged body act perpendicular to the body's surface. The design of the Tainter gate results in every pressure force acting through the centre of the imaginary circle of which the gate is a section, so that all resulting pressure force acts through the pivot point of the gate, making construction and design easier.

When a Tainter gate is closed, water bears on the convex (upstream) side. When the gate is rotated, the rush of water passing under the gate helps to open and close the gate. The rounded face, long radial arms and bearings allow it to close with less effort than a flat gate. Tainter gates are usually controlled from above with a chain/gearbox/electric motor assembly.

A critical factor in Tainter gate design is the amount of stress transferred from the skinplate through the radial arms to the trunnion, with calculations pertaining to the resulting friction encountered when raising or lowering the gate. Some older systems have had to be modified to allow for frictional forces which the original design did not anticipate. In 1995, too much stress during an opening resulted in a gate failure at Folsom Dam in northern California.

Another advantage of a Tainter gate is its ability to increase reservoir capacity and regulate the flow rate of water passed. When a Tainter gate is open, it is raised a certain amount above the dam's spillway ledge until the desired flow rate is obtained. For every foot that a gate is opened, the entire reservoir's level is effectively increased by the same amount. Therefore as the water level in a reservoir approaches the top of the spillway gates, the gates can be opened to lower the reservoir level. If the inflow of the reservoir is greater than what is being spilled, the water level can still rise up the steel gates. This extra capacity can be used to delay sending water downstream, for example if the river below is experiencing a major flood. The Tainter gates can help hold back more than the designed capacity of the impounded water, allowing more time for natural runoff to dissipate.

== Use ==
The Tainter gate is used in water control dams and locks worldwide. The Upper Mississippi River basin alone has 321 Tainter gates, and the Columbia River basin has 195. A Tainter gate is also used to divert the flow of water to San Fernando Power Plant on the Los Angeles Aqueduct.

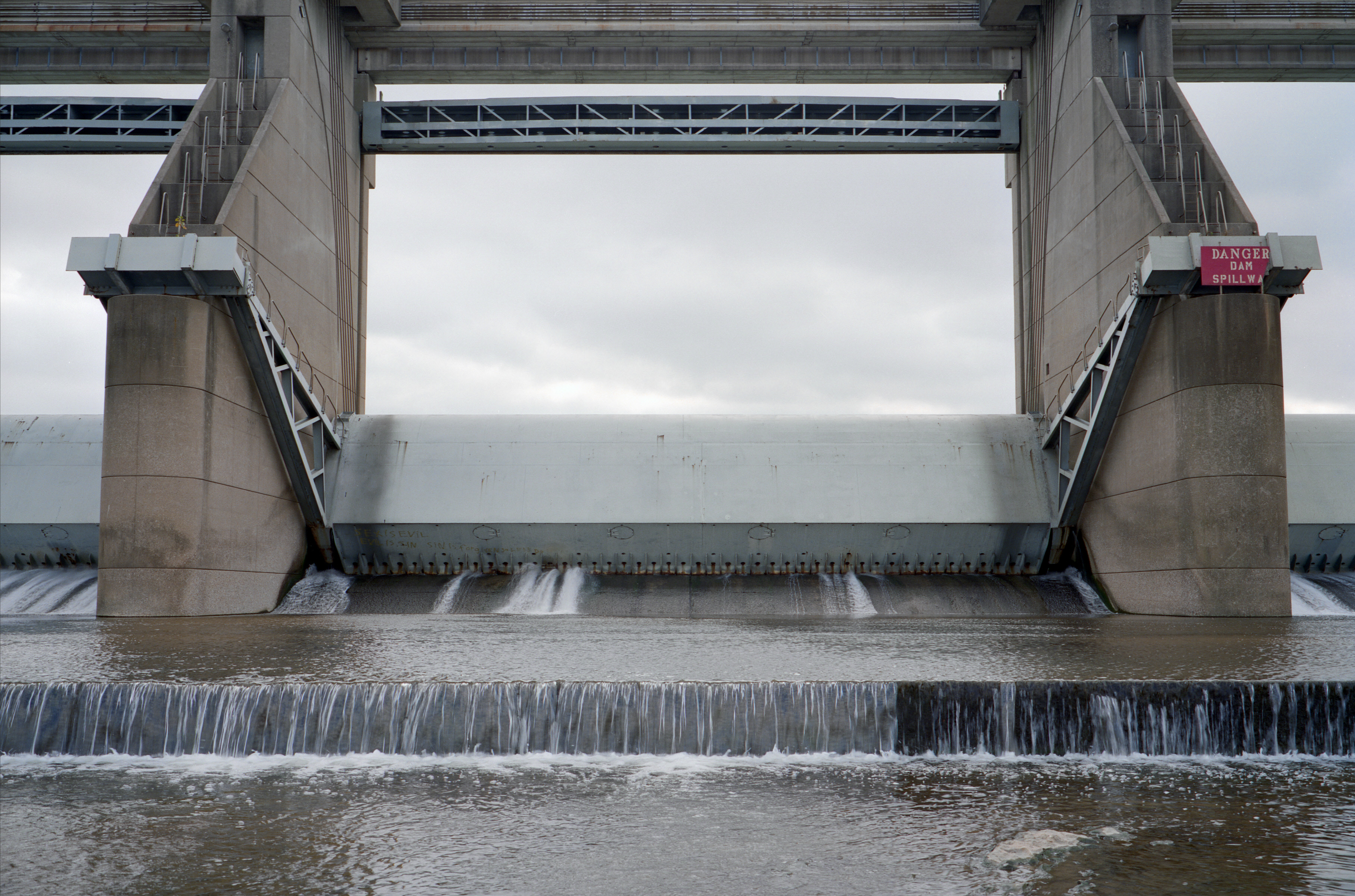
Tainter gate at McAlpine Dam, Ohio River, Louisville, Kentucky

== See also ==
- Roller dam
