= Roller dam =

Anti-erosion hydro-control device

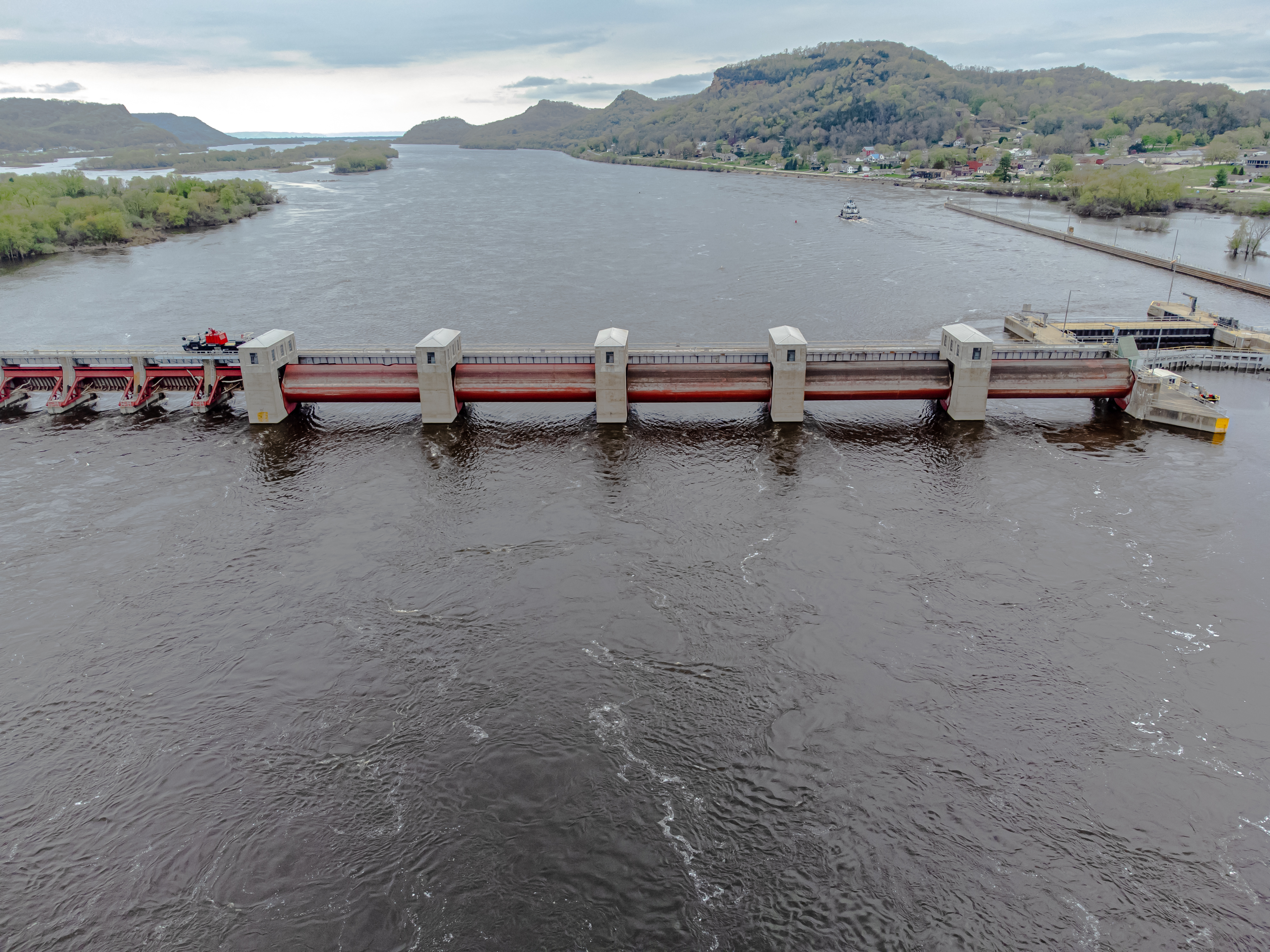
Lock and Dam 6 roller gates. Tainter gates are to the left.

A roller dam is a type of hydro-control device specially designed to mitigate erosion. They are most often used to divert water for irrigation but the largest and most notable examples are used to ease river navigation. The world's first roller dam (German: walzenwehr) was constructed in Schweinfurt, Germany in 1902 to divert irrigation water south of the Main river.

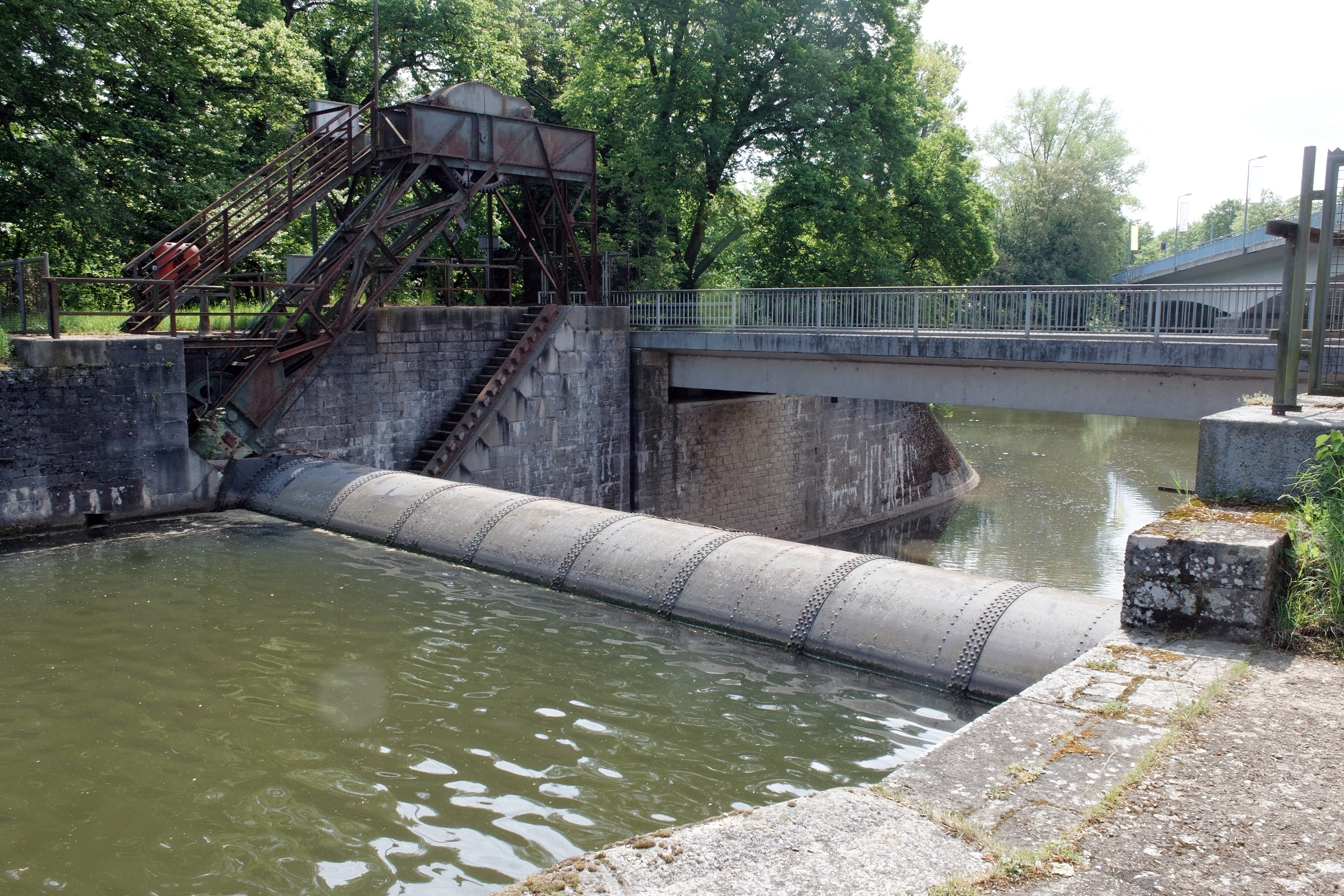
The first roller dam in the world, built 1902 in Schweinfurt

== Use ==
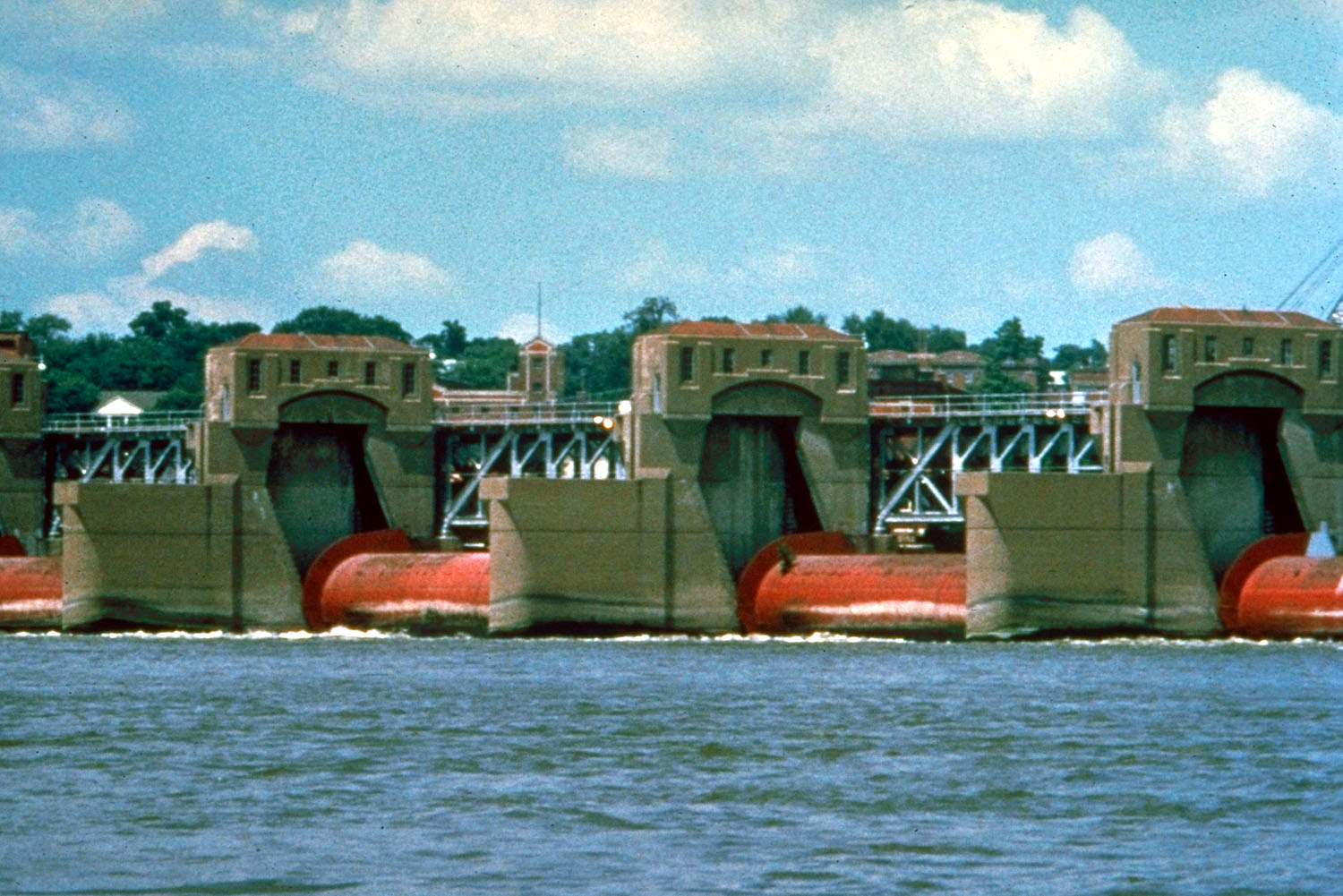
Roller gates of Mississippi River Lock and Dam No. 15, the largest roller dam in the world.

Roller dams are a type of weir, or a dam that is designed to allow water to flow over the top in continuous action. They are used on rivers or other such moving bodies of water where erosion damage is undesirable, yet likely to occur. A short wall, lip, or parabolic channel is constructed on the downstream side of the dam parallel to the dam face. As the water pouring over the dam hits this baffle, it is reflected toward the dam face, creating a continual "rolling" action at the foot of the dam; hence the name "Roller Dam". The purpose of the rolling is to dissipate the energy gained by the water as it falls from the top of the dam. Otherwise the energy would be exerted downstream, causing significant bank and river bed erosion.

Roller dams can be either fixed (non-moving) or active. Fixed roller dams are generally made from reinforced concrete or masonry. Active roller dams are made from large metal cylinders, which can be lifted out of the water using a system of powerful hydraulic rams or cables and motors. This type is also known as a roller gate. The largest of the active dams in the world is Locks and Dam 15, which spans the Mississippi River between Rock Island, Illinois, and Davenport, Iowa.

== Hazards ==
Roller dams of any type pose an extreme drowning hazard. Any person going over the top of the dam will be caught in the rolling action at its base and may not be ejected from the cycle for days or possibly weeks. Even very buoyant objects, such as inflatable balls, inner tubes, and life vests, can often be seen resurfacing near the downstream face every few seconds for several hours before escaping the so-called "washing machine of death".

Because of the hazards, dam opponents have called for the removal of roller dams. Sixteen people have died by drowning at the roller dam on the Fox River near Yorkville, Illinois, since its construction in 1960. Most recently in a single accident on May 28, 2006, three persons died. Similar dams have already been removed on the Fox River at Aurora, Illinois, and near Batavia, Illinois, but Yorkville residents successfully petitioned to maintain the roller dam near their town because of tradition. In July 2009, a man died at a roller dam on the Cedar River in Cedar Rapids, Iowa. His death was notable because he was wearing an approved personal flotation device, intended to help bring a person quickly to the surface of the water.

== See also ==
- Tainter gate
