= National Register of Historic Places listings in Trempealeau County, Wisconsin =

Location of Trempealeau County in Wisconsin

This is a list of the National Register of Historic Places listings in Trempealeau County, Wisconsin. It is intended to provide a comprehensive listing of entries in the National Register of Historic Places that are located in Trempealeau County, Wisconsin. The locations of National Register properties for which the latitude and longitude coordinates are included below may be seen in a map.

There are 18 properties and districts listed on the National Register in the county. Another property was once listed but has been removed.

This National Park Service list is complete through NPS recent listings posted March 21, 2025.

== Current listings ==
	Name on the Register	Image	Date listed	Location	City or town	Description
1	Arcadia Free Public Library	Arcadia Free Public Library	April 29, 1994 (#94000388)	406 East Main Street; 44°15′08″N 91°29′44″W	Arcadia	Carnegie library built in 1906 in Neoclassical style and stocked partly with books donated by Senator Levi Withee.
2	Capt. Alexander A. Arnold Farm	Capt. Alexander A. Arnold Farm	March 21, 1978 (#78000142)	North of Galesville off U.S. 53; 44°05′33″N 91°20′24″W	Galesville	Italianate house with three-story tower built in 1874 by Arnold, a Civil War vet, farmer, banker, and Speaker of the Wisconsin assembly.
3	Bartlett Blacksmith Shop-Scandinavian Hotel	Bartlett Blacksmith Shop-Scandinavian Hotel	September 18, 1984 (#84003786)	218 East Mill Road; 44°04′55″N 91°20′54″W	Galesville	The front brick blacksmith shop was built in 1871, one of the earliest commercial buildings in town. In 1900 it was converted to a boarding house called the Scandinavia Hotel. In 1945 it was converted again, to a dairy plant. Now a residence.
4	John Bohrnstedt House	John Bohrnstedt House	September 18, 1984 (#84003788)	830 Clark Street; 44°05′07″N 91°21′34″W	Galesville	Fine 2.5-story brick house with gabled-ell plan built in 1901. John immigrated from Germany, farmed, served in the Civil War, and held stock in the Bank of Galesville.
5	John F. Cance House	John F. Cance House	September 18, 1984 (#84003790)	807 West Ridge Avenue; 44°04′59″N 91°20′48″W	Galesville	1908 house designed by G. H. Carsley in Tudor Revival style, with the original carriage house. President of the Bank of Galesville, Cance had worked his way up from an entry-level position.
6	Coman House	Coman House	November 15, 1984 (#84000747)	581 Third Street; 44°00′16″N 91°26′04″W	Trempealeau	Brick Italianate-style house with cupola, built in 1862.
7	Downtown Historic District	Downtown Historic District	September 18, 1984 (#84003791)	Roughly Gale Avenue, Main, and Davis Streets; 44°04′58″N 91°20′55″W	Galesville	17 contributing buildings, mostly commercial, including the 1871 Bartlett Blacksmith shop, the 1886 Romanesque Revival Clark Block, the 1902 Romanesque Revival T. E. Jensen & Co Confectionery, and the public square's bandstand, built in 1912.
8	East Arcadia Roller Mill	East Arcadia Roller Mill	March 22, 2021 (#100006294)	W25818 Mill Rd. 44°15′04″N 91°27′54″W	Arcadia	Two-story gristmill built in 1900 on the bank of Turton Creek by millers Michael Stelmach and John Kalma.
9	Gale College Historic District	Gale College Historic District	February 14, 1997 (#84004020)	Twelfth Street; 44°04′46″N 91°22′04″W	Galesville	Buildings of the defunct Gale College, consisting of the 1859 Italianate Old Main (pictured), the 1906 Men's Dormitory, and the 1915 Ladies Hall.
10	Green Bay and Western Railroad Depot	Green Bay and Western Railroad Depot	April 19, 2006 (#06000302)	36295 Main Street; 44°22′06″N 91°19′03″W	Whitehall	Small brick depot built in 1914 by the Green Bay and Western Railroad with separate waiting rooms for men and women. It replaced an earlier wooden depot built in 1877 by the Green Bay and Lake Pepin Railroad.
11	Hanson-Losinski Rockshelter Complex		March 22, 2024 (#100010089)	Address Restricted	Arcadia vicinity	Quarries and carvings of deer, birds, diamonds and ovals made by prehistoric people beneath sandstone blufftop overhangs.
12	Independence City Hall	Independence City Hall	January 17, 2002 (#01001474)	23688 Adams Street; 44°21′27″N 91°25′16″W	Independence	City hall and opera house with clock tower, designed in Queen Anne style by C. G. Maybury & Sons of Winona. Begun in 1902, half-destroyed by the tornado in 1903, but then completed. Re-equipped as a movie theater in the 1920s.
13	Tollef Jensen House	Tollef Jensen House	September 18, 1984 (#84003793)	806 West Gale Avenue; 44°04′58″N 91°21′34″W	Galesville	2.5 story Queen Anne house built in 1913 for Tollef, who owned an ice cream and confectionery shop in Galesville.
14	Main Street Historic District	Main Street Historic District	November 15, 1984 (#84000763)	Roughly Main Street between First and Third Streets; 44°00′18″N 91°26′32″W	Trempealeau	Ten contributing commercial buildings, ranging from wooden Boomtown-style stores built around 1880 to the 1888 Queen Anne E. J. Hankey General Store, to the 1912 Prairie School Citizens State Bank, to Dr. Pierce's office, built in 1915.
15	Melchoir Brewery and Hotel Ruins	Melchoir Brewery and Hotel Ruins	November 15, 1984 (#84000769)	Address Restricted	Trempealeau	First brewery in Trempealeau County, built in 1857 of sandstone blocks cut from the caves in the bluff behind the building. Prussian immigrant Jacob Melchoir brewed lager from locally grown wheat and stored it in those caves at 44 degrees year-round.
16	Ridge Avenue Historic District	Ridge Avenue Historic District	September 18, 1984 (#84003792)	Roughly Ridge Avenue from Forth to Sixth Streets; 44°05′01″N 91°21′18″W	Galesville	11 contributing buildings, consisting of the 1895 Queen Anne First Presbyterian Church, variations of Queen Anne homes, and a Mediterranean Revival home built in 1930.
17	Schwert Mound Group	Schwert Mound Group	November 1, 1974 (#74000128)	Address Restricted	Trempealeau	Remnants of a group of 26 conical mounds. The mound pictured (Nicholls) contained Hopewell people buried in a bark structure with points and pipes traded from as far as the Rocky Mountains and Lake Superior.
18	Trempealeau Platform Mounds Site	Trempealeau Platform Mounds Site	December 23, 1991 (#91001822)	Eastern extremity of the Trempealeau Bluffs; 44°00′29″N 91°26′33″W	Trempealeau	Three Mississippian platform mounds on a bluff, built around 1000 AD. Shards of pottery from Cahokia have been found below.

== Former listing ==
	Name on the Register	Image	Date listed	Date removed	Location	City or town	Description
1	Second Street Bridge		December 12, 1984 (#84000608)	May 18, 1988	Second Street	Galesville	Metal, overhead Pratt truss bridge, built in 1910.

== See also ==
- List of National Historic Landmarks in Wisconsin
- National Register of Historic Places listings in Wisconsin
- Listings in neighboring counties: Buffalo, Eau Claire, La Crosse, Jackson, Winona (MN)
