= Ridge Avenue (disambiguation) =

Ridge Avenue is an avenue in Chicago, Illinois, United States.

Ridge Avenue may also refer to:

- the segment of Ridge Pike in Philadelphia, US
- Ridge Avenue Historic District (disambiguation)
