= Robert Grimes Coman =

United States Navy commodore

- Born: September 17, 1887; Trempealeau, Wisconsin, US
- Died: September 29, 1963 (aged 76)
- Burial place: Arlington National Cemetery
- Military career
- Allegiance: United States
- Branch: United States Navy
- Service years: 1909–1946
- Rank: Commodore
- Commands: USS Truxtun; USS Hamilton; USS Farquhar; USS Twiggs; USS Sloat; USS Reno; USS Vestal; USS New Mexico
- Conflicts: World War I World War II
- Awards: Legion of Merit

Robert Grimes Coman (September 17, 1887 – September 29, 1963) was a Commodore in the United States Navy.

== Biography ==
Coman was born in Trempealeau, Wisconsin, graduated from the United States Naval Academy in 1909, and was commissioned in 1911. He was Commanding Officer of the destroyers Truxtun in 1914–15, the Hamilton in 1919–20, and the Farquhar, Twiggs and Sloat in 1921. He was Commanding Officer of the destroyer Reno from February 1927 to March 1928. Coman served as District Communications Officer of the 14th Naval District based at Pearl Harbor in 1928–31.

He was Commanding Officer of the fleet repair ship Vestal in 1937–38, and of the battleship New Mexico in January–September 1941.

He served as Commander of Receiving Station Philadelphia 1941–42, then of Transport Division Three, Amphibious Force, Atlantic Fleet, in April–December 1942. He commanded Task Force 19, Amphibious Force, December 1942–February 1943, then Service Force, Seventh Fleet, in 1943–44. He then had duty at the 12th Naval District from September 1944 to March 1945, then with the Commander of the Western Sea Frontier, 1945–46. Promoted to Commodore in April 1945, he retired in November 1946.

Commodore Coman died on September 29, 1963, and is buried at Arlington National Cemetery along with his wives Mary McMean Coman (1888–1941) and Hazel May Coman (1906–1990).

== Awards ==
His awards include the Legion of Merit.
