= Melchoir Brewery and Hotel Ruins =

- Melchoir Hotel and Brewery Ruins
- U.S. National Register of Historic Places
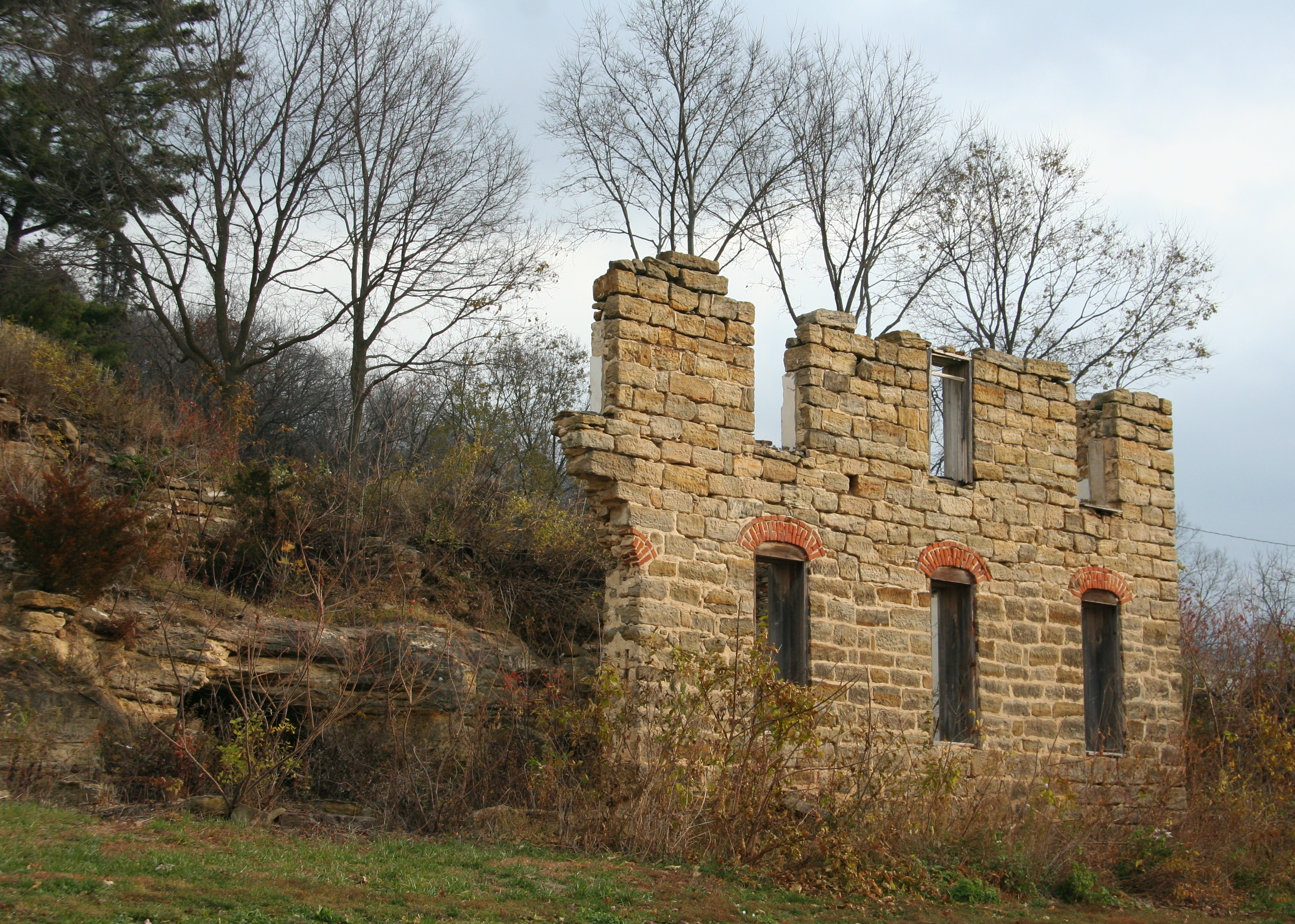
- Nearest city: Trempealeau, Wisconsin
- Area: less than 1 acre (0.40 ha)
- Built: 1857
- MPS: Trempealeau MRA
- NRHP reference No.: 84000769
- Added to NRHP: November 15, 1984

The Melchoir Brewery and Hotel Ruins are located at the base of the bluffs along the Mississippi River in Trempealeau, Wisconsin. Built in 1857, the site was added to the National Register of Historic Places in 1984.

== History ==
Jacob Melchoir was a Prussian immigrant who began a small brewing enterprise in an old log cabin in the 1850s. In spite of the national depression, Melchoir chose to expand in 1857, building a combined brewery and hotel with a scenic view overlooking the Mississippi.

While the hotel was quickly becoming a popular destination for steamboat passengers, the brewery was producing beer that was shipped to the Twin Cities, rivaling the popularity of Milwaukee beer.

The two-story structure was constructed of sandstone blocks hewn from the bluffs it sits among. In order to maintain cool storage conditions, the brewery's beer was kept in a series of caves cut into the bluff behind the building, where the temperature lingered in the 40s year-round. Today, remnants of two of the sandstone walls remain, punctuated by deep-set wooden windows graced by brick arches. The mouths of storage caves lie exposed, dark recesses in the bluff framed by weeds.

According to the Wisconsin Historical Society, the ruins “provide valuable insight into the construction and operations of a small-scale 19th century brewery.” Beyond its research value, the brewery-hotel's ruins are a reminder of the important role Melchoir's investment played in revitalizing Trempealeau's local economy during the late nineteenth century, when this brewery was one of the county's larger industries.
