= Ridge Avenue Historic District =

Ridge Avenue Historic District may refer to:

- Ridge Avenue Historic District (Idaho Falls, Idaho), listed on the National Register of Historic Places (NRHP) in Bonneville County, Idaho
- Ridge Avenue Historic District (Galesville, Wisconsin), also NRHP-listed
