= Trempealeau Mountain State Natural Area =

State Natural Area in Wisconsin

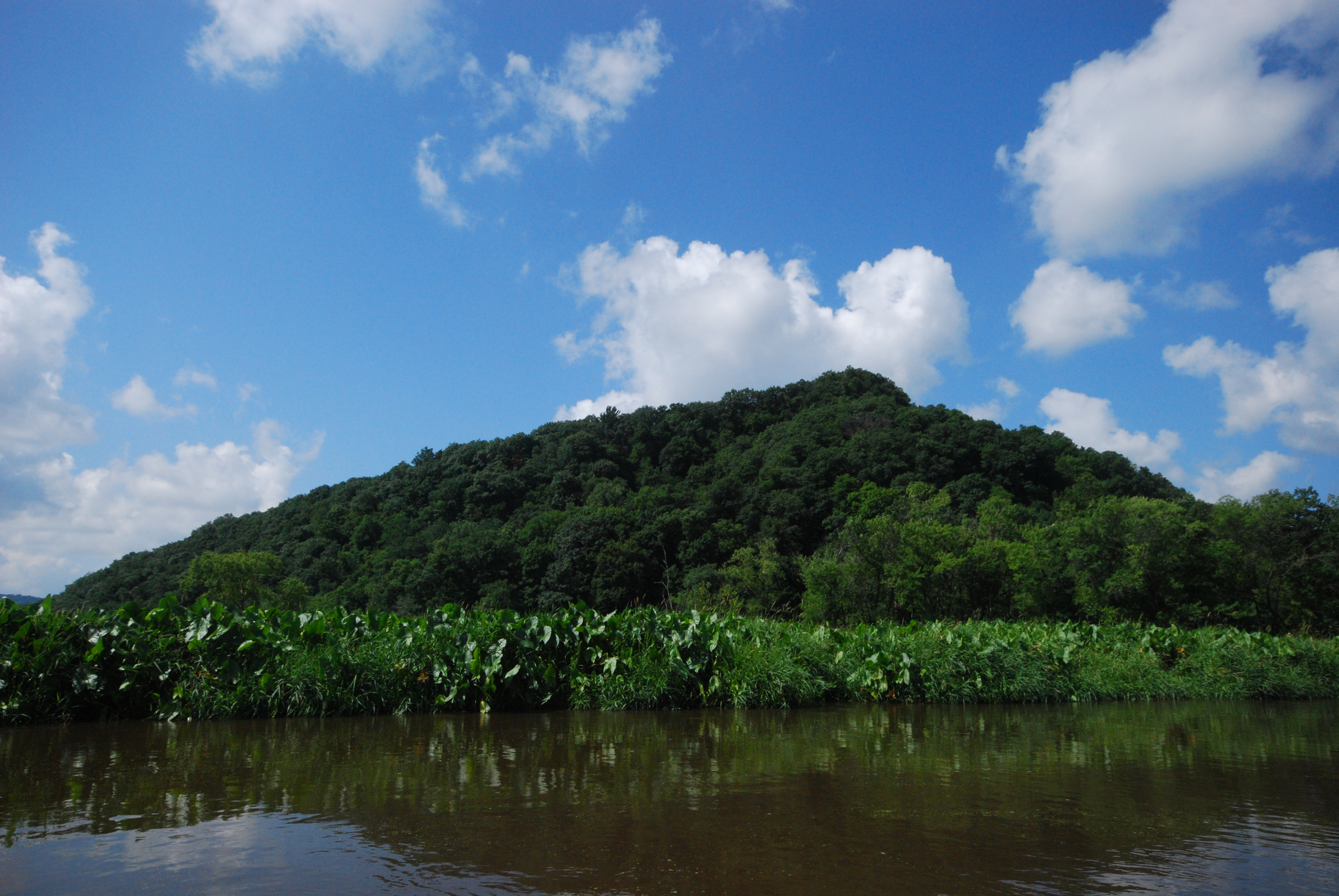

- Location within Wisconsin Location within the United States
- Location: Trempealeau County, Wisconsin
- Coordinates: 44°01′16″N 91°29′46″W
- Area: 90 acres (36 ha)
- Elevation: 958 ft (292 m)
- Established: 2002
- Owner: Wisconsin Department of Natural Resources
- Website: Official website
- Wisconsin State Natural Areas

Trempealeau Mountain State Natural Area is a Wisconsin Department of Natural Resources-designated State Natural Area consisting of a 425-foot conical rock mound surrounded on three sides by the Mississippi and Trempealeau Rivers. It is one of only 3 solid rock islands along the entire Mississippi River.

== Location and access ==
Trempealeau Mountain State Natural Area is located in western Trempealeau County approximately 2 miles (3.2 km) southwest of Trempealeau within Perrot State Park. Access is via the Mississippi and Trempealeau Rivers.

== Description ==
Trempealeau Mountain is mostly wooded, dominated by black and white oak and basswood. In a hollow on the southeast-facing side, red oaks are found mixed with patches of interrupted ferns. On the cooler northeast-facing slopes, sugar maple and basswood dominate. The dry south-facing slopes contain small patches of dry prairie with big blue-stem, needle grass, side-oats grama, hairy grama, white and purple prairie-clover, prairie larkspur, and partridge pea. Numerous Native American mounds, burial sites, and habitation sites make this a rich archeological site. French explorers were among the first Europeans to explore the area and the name Trempealeau comes from the French, “la montagne qui trempe à l’eau” meaning “the mountain whose foot is bathed in water”.

== Gallery ==
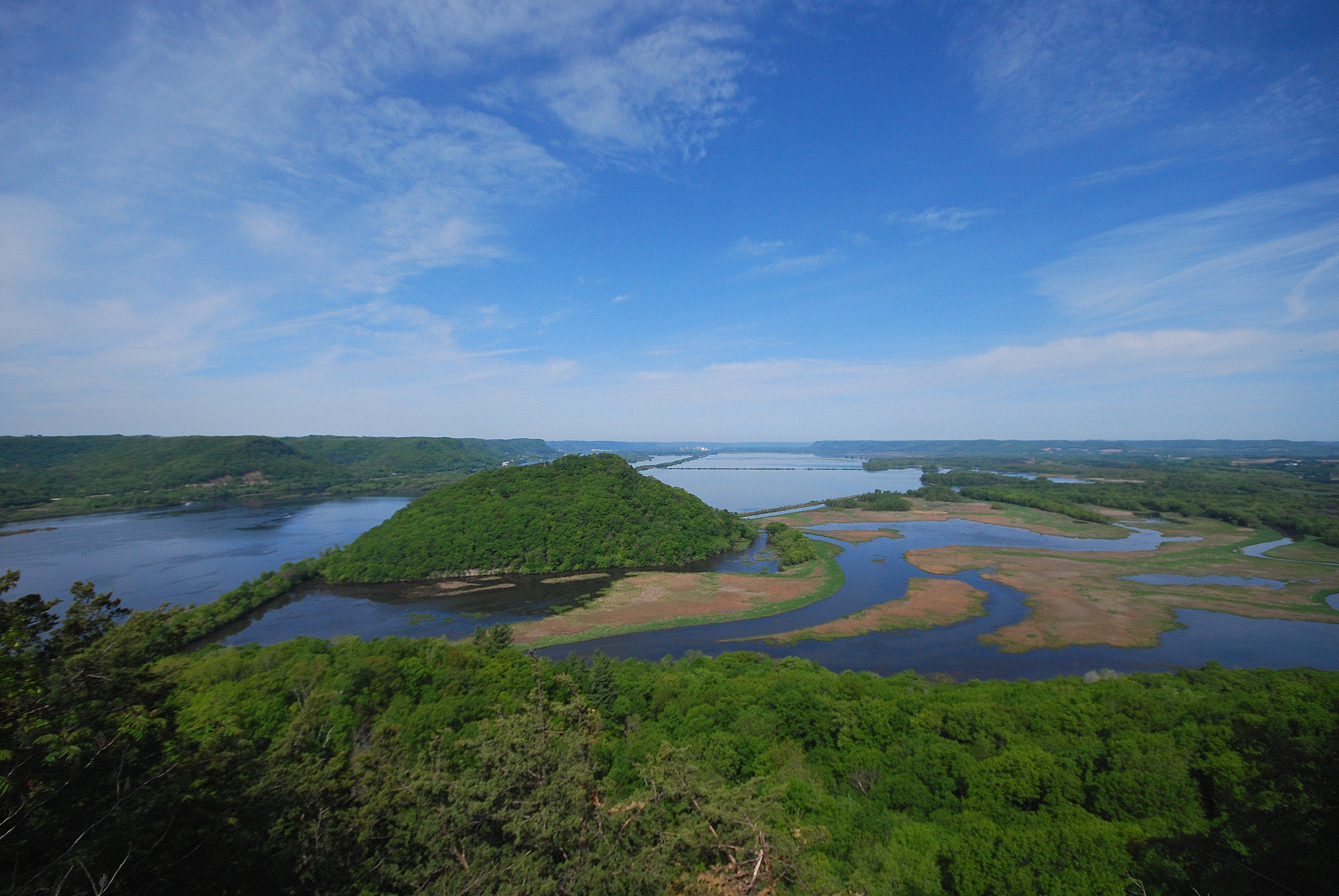
Trempealeau Mountain SNA (viewed from Brady's Bluff SNA)

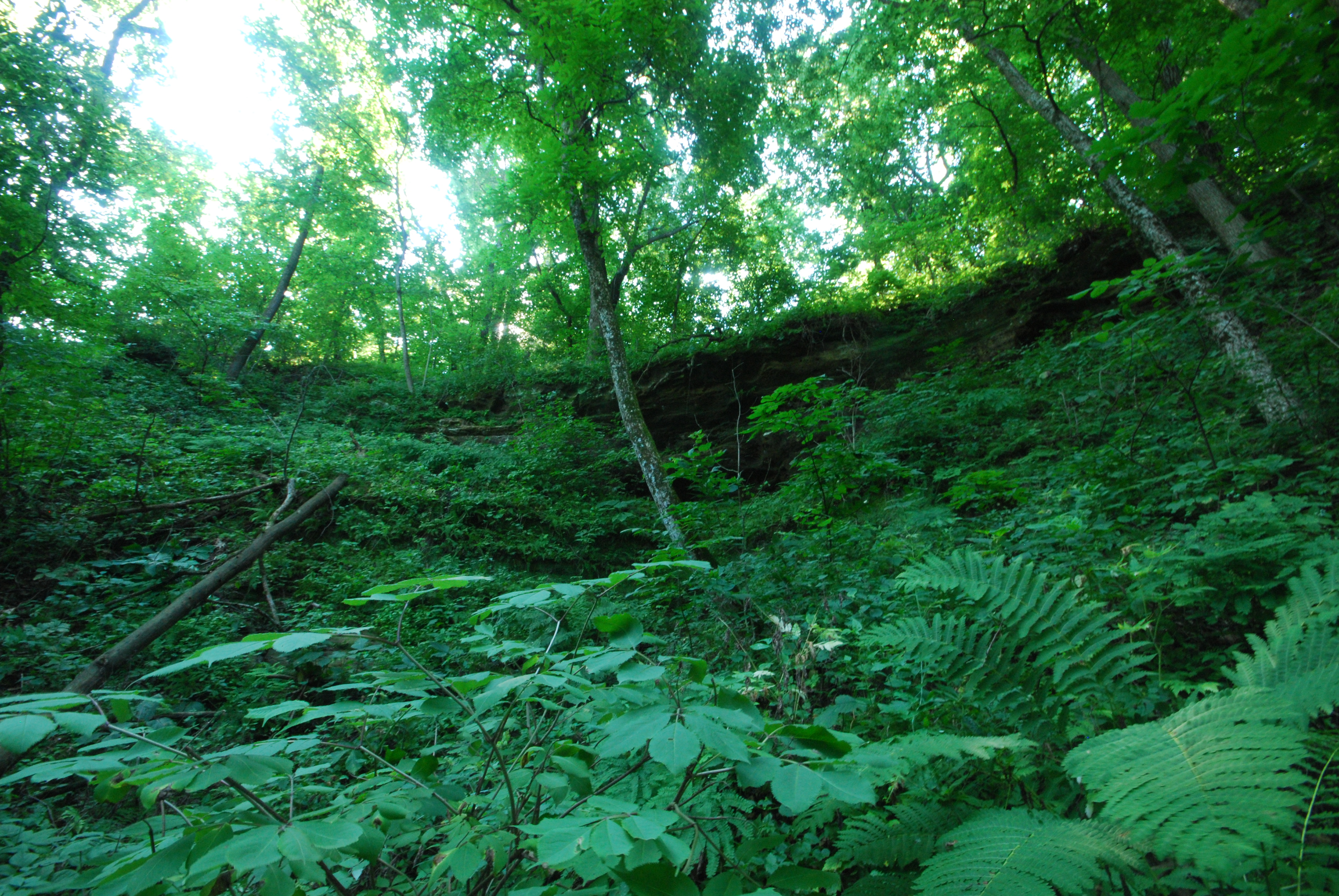
Hollow on Trempealeau Mountain

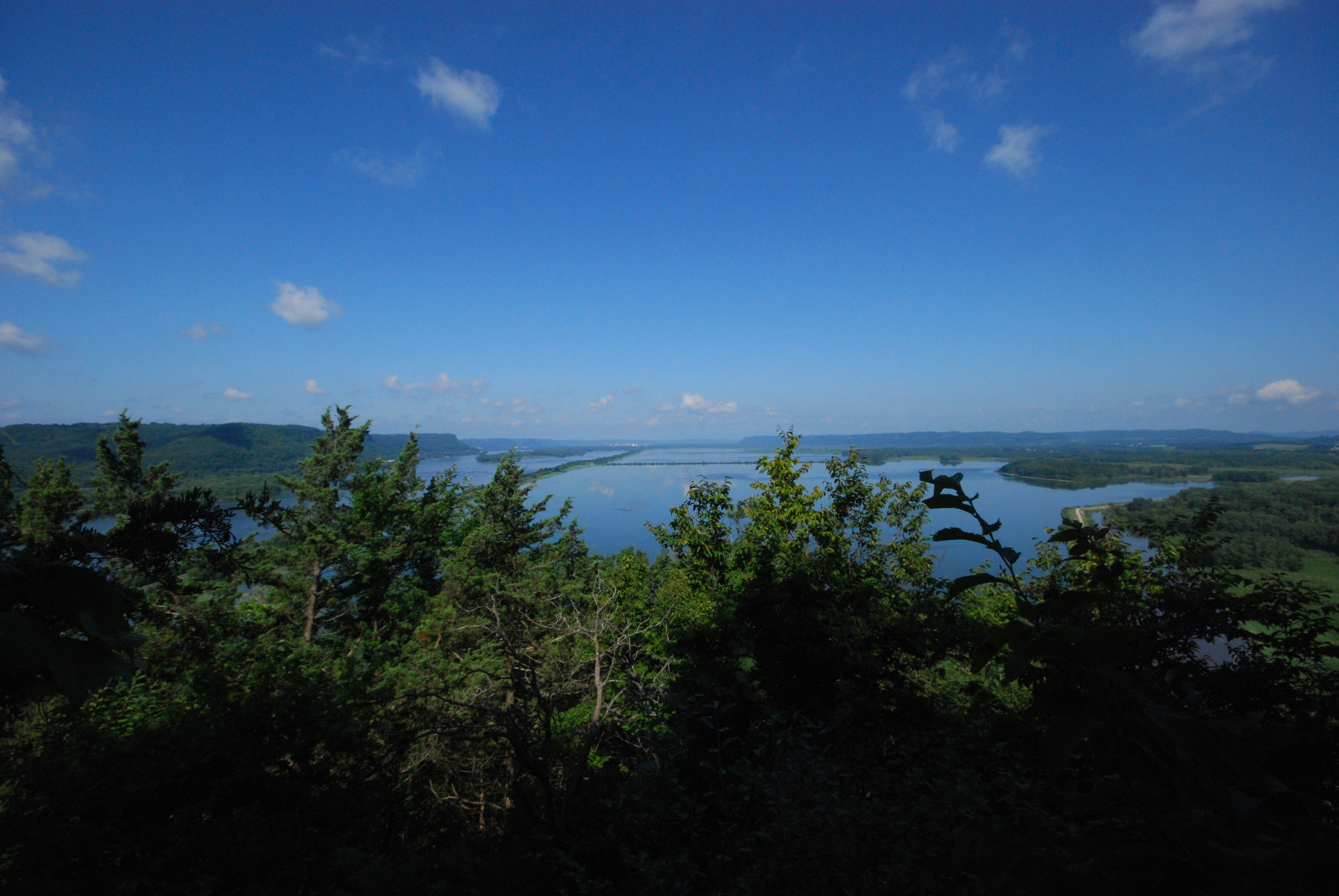
View from Trempealeau Mountain peak

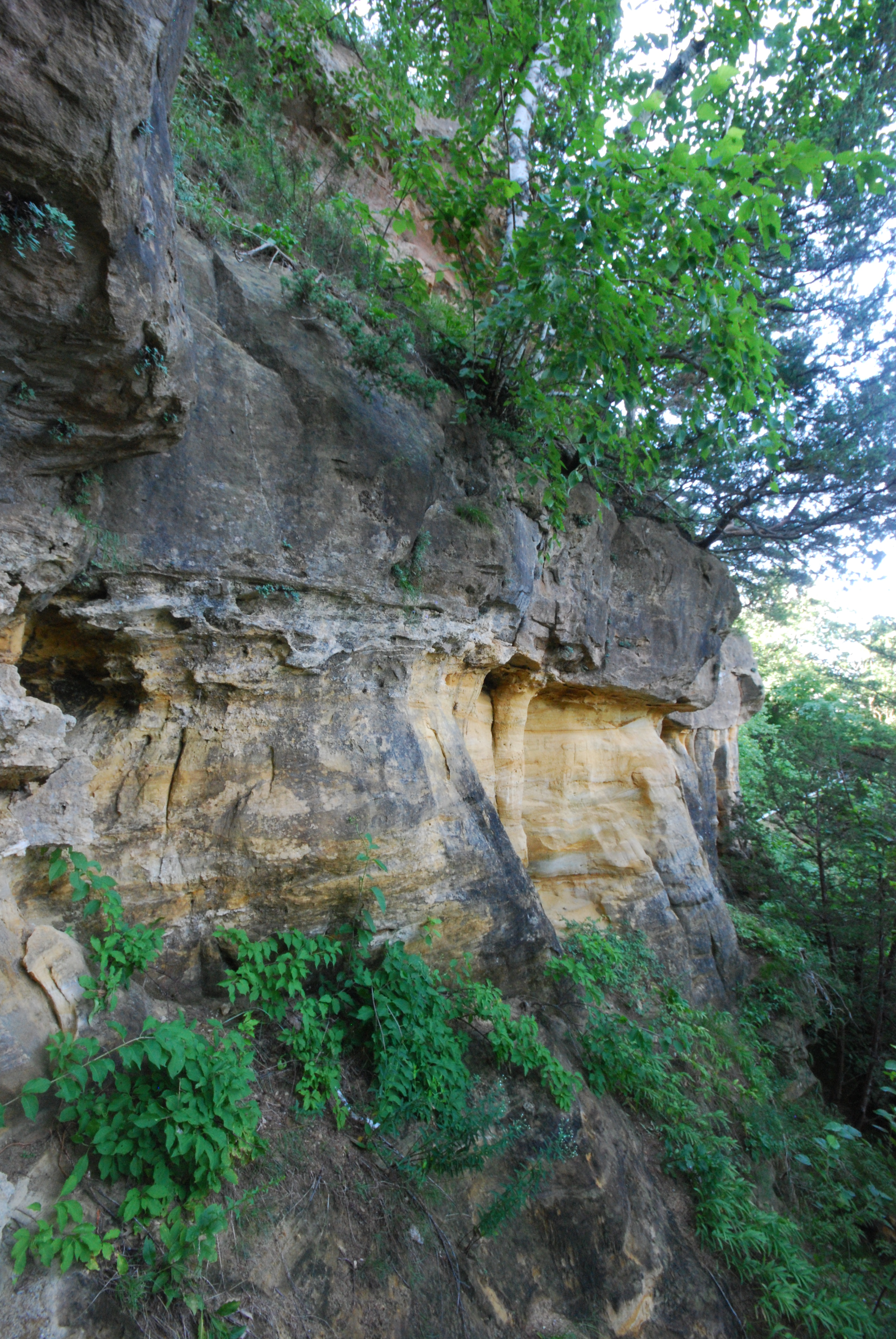
Exposed rockface at Trempealeau Mountain
