= Lock and Dam No. 6 =

Dam in Minnesota and Wisconsin, U.S.

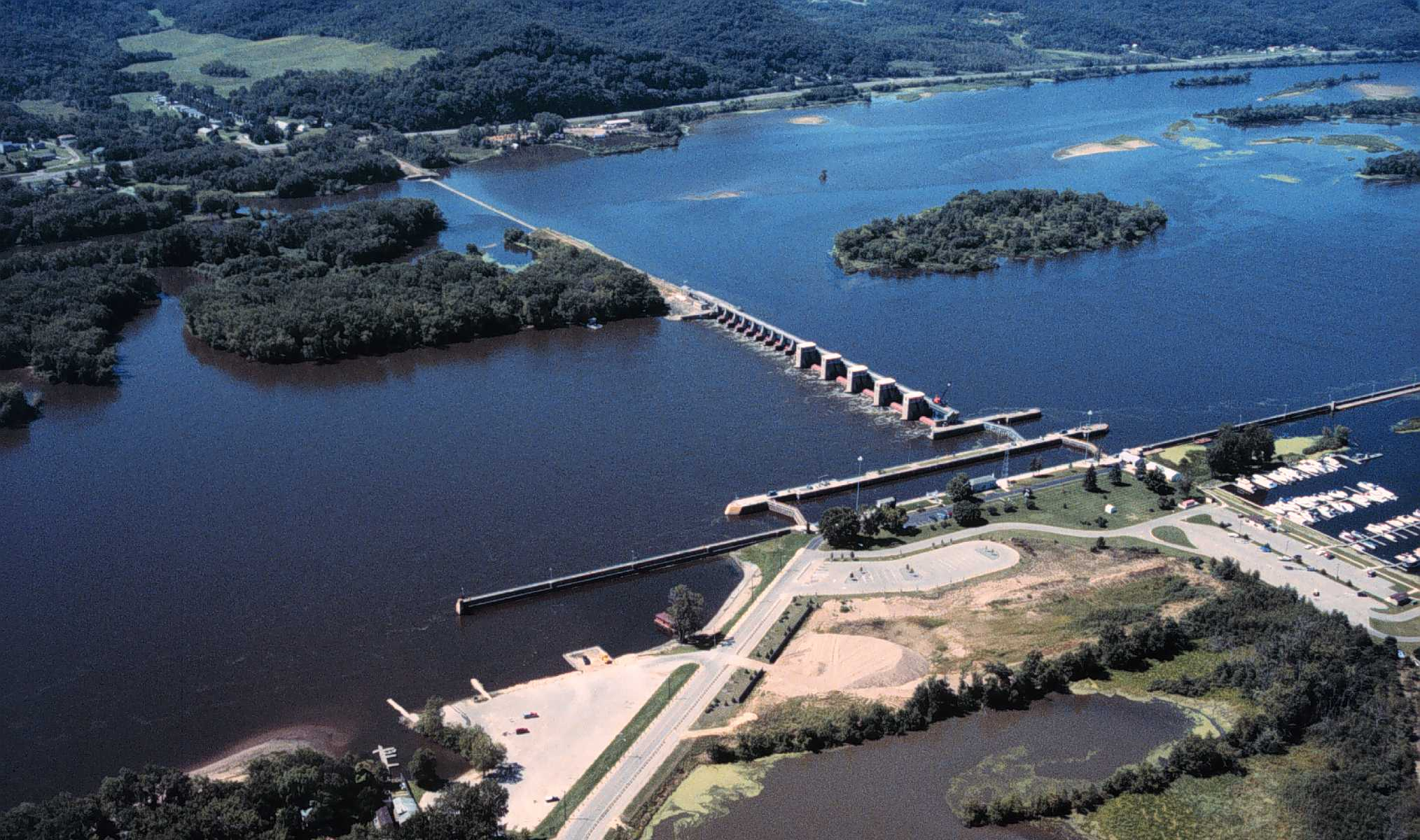
- Mississippi River Lock and Dam number 6.

- Location within Wisconsin
- Location: Trempealeau County, Wisconsin / Winona County, Minnesota, United States. Near Trempealeau, Wisconsin.
- Coordinates: 43°59′59″N 91°26′18″W
- Construction began: 1933; 93 years ago
- Opening date: June 1936; 90 years ago
- Operators: U.S. Army Corps of Engineers, St. Paul District

Dam and spillways
- Impounds: Upper Mississippi River
- Length: 893 feet (272.2 m)(movable portion)

Reservoir
- Creates: Pool 6
- Total capacity: 180,000 acre⋅ft (0.22 km^{3})
- Catchment area: 60,030 mi^{2} (155,500 km^{2})

Lock and Dam No. 6 is a lock and dam located near Trempealeau, Wisconsin on the Upper Mississippi River near river mile 714.1. It was constructed and placed in operation in June 1936. The last major rehabilitation was from 1989 to 1999. The dam consists of 893 feet (272.2 m) long concrete structure with five roller gates and 10 tainter gates. Its earth embankment is 2,600 feet (792.5 m)long and the concrete overflow spillway is 1,000 feet (304.8 m) long. The lock is 110 feet (33.5 m) wide by 600 feet (182.9 m) long. The lock and dam are owned and operated by the St. Paul District of the United States Army Corps of Engineers-Mississippi Valley Division.

== Gallery ==
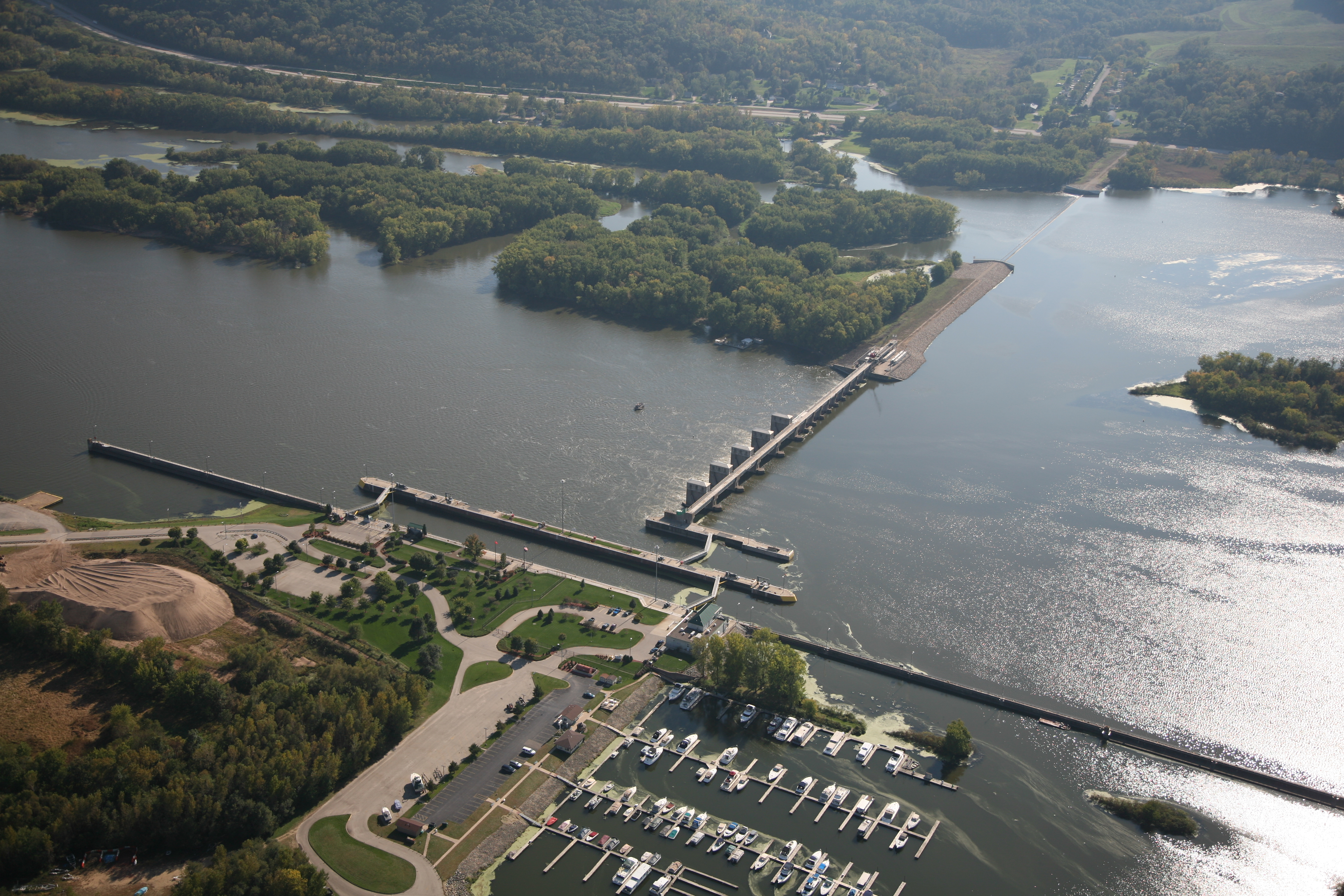

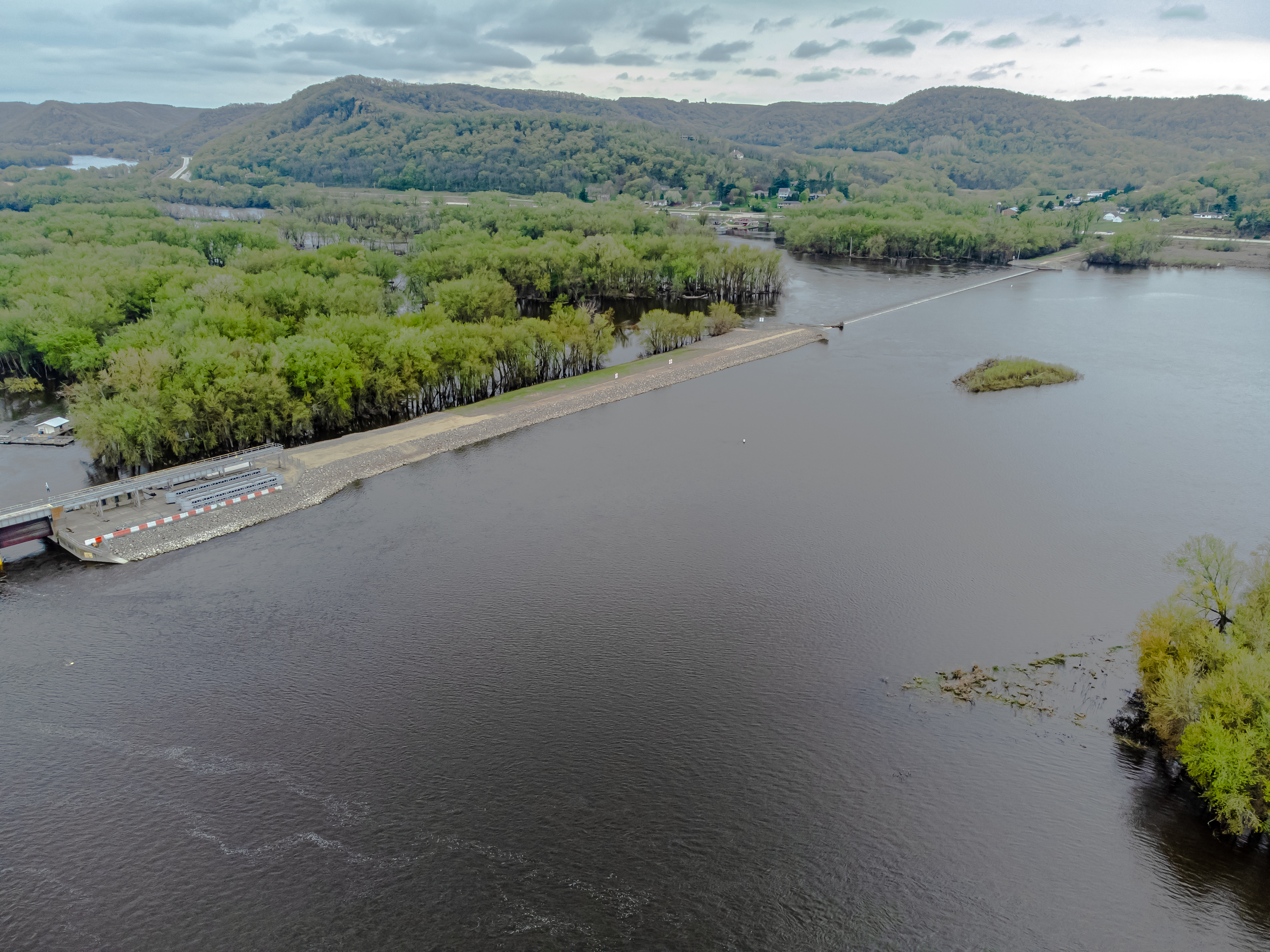
Spillway

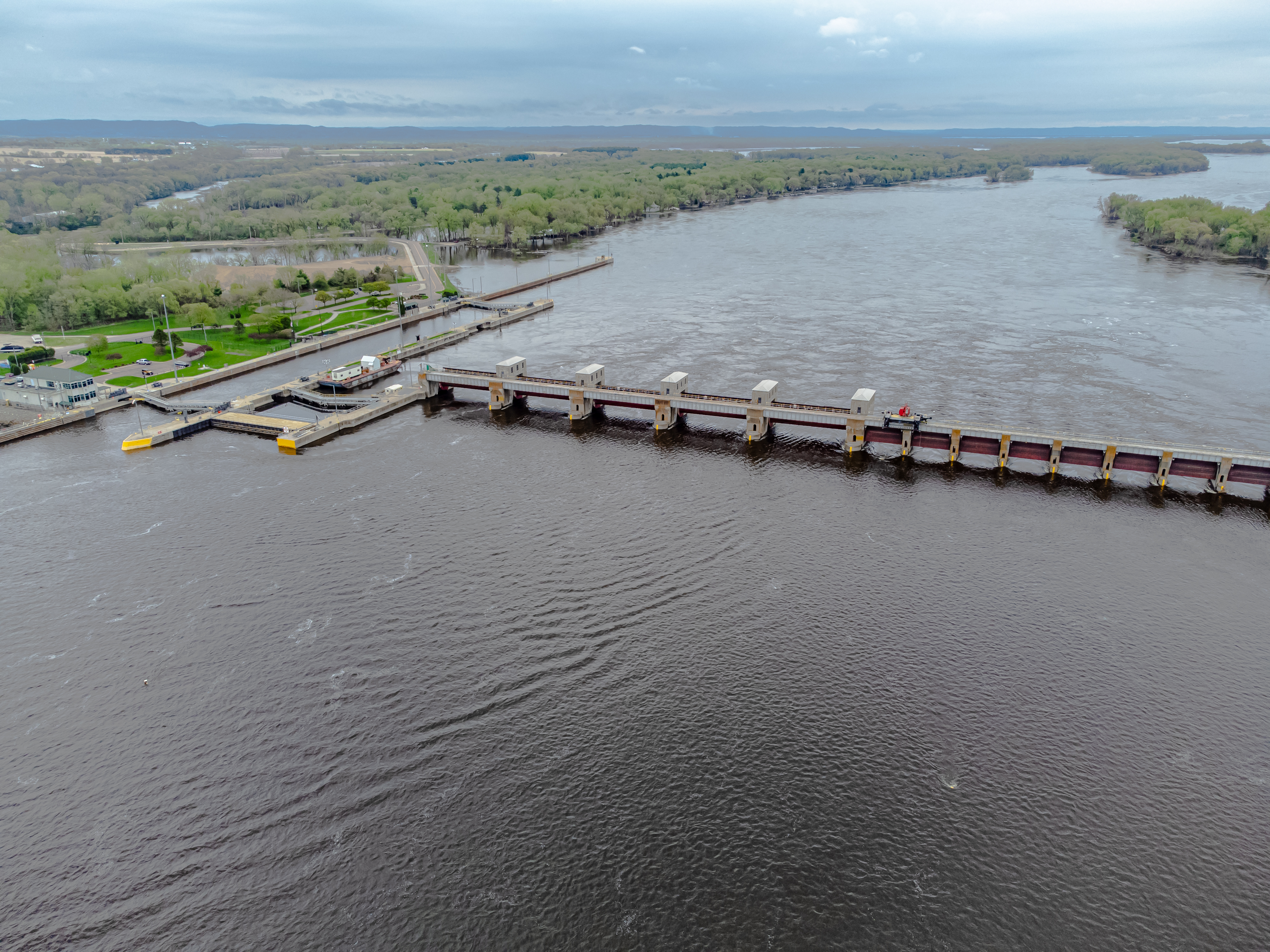

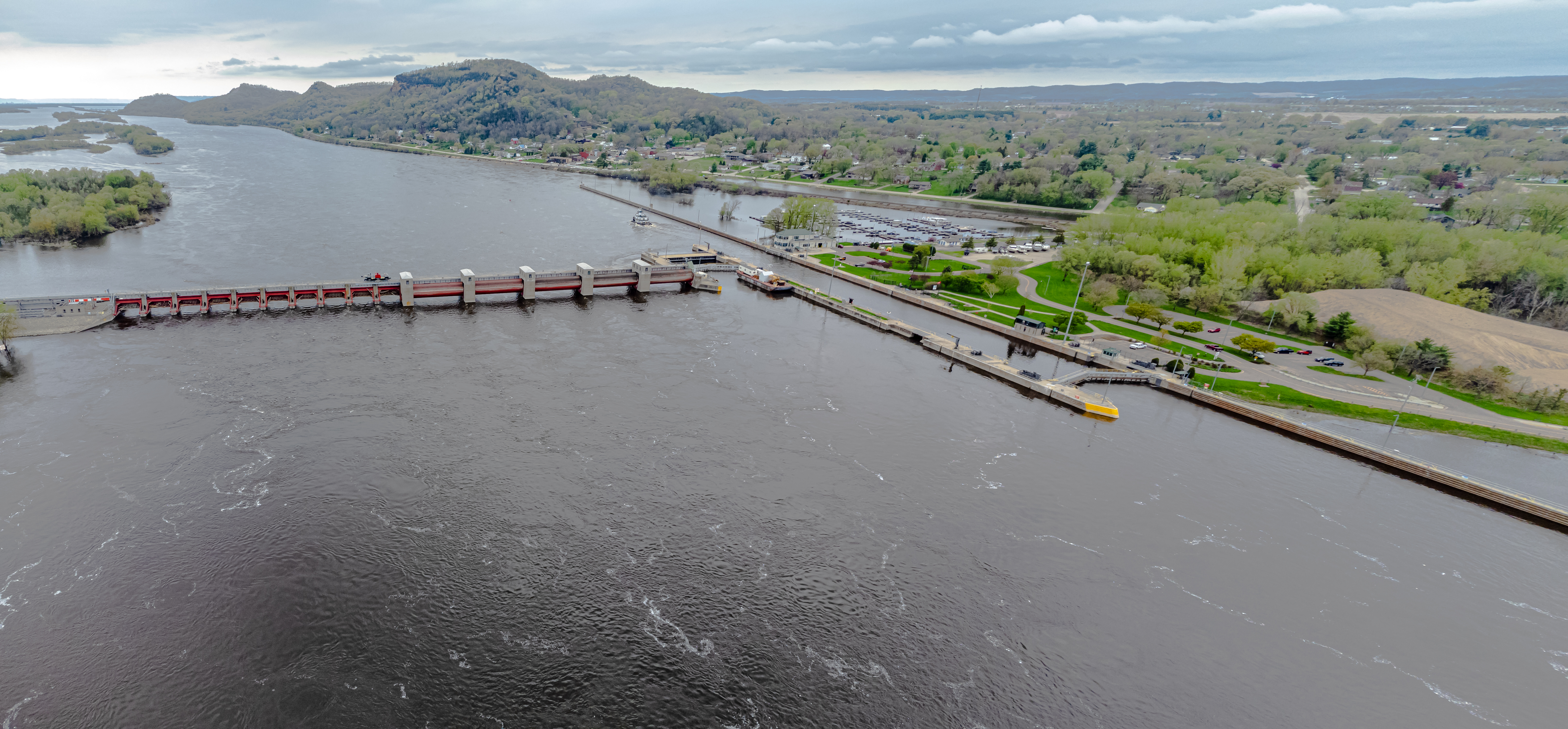

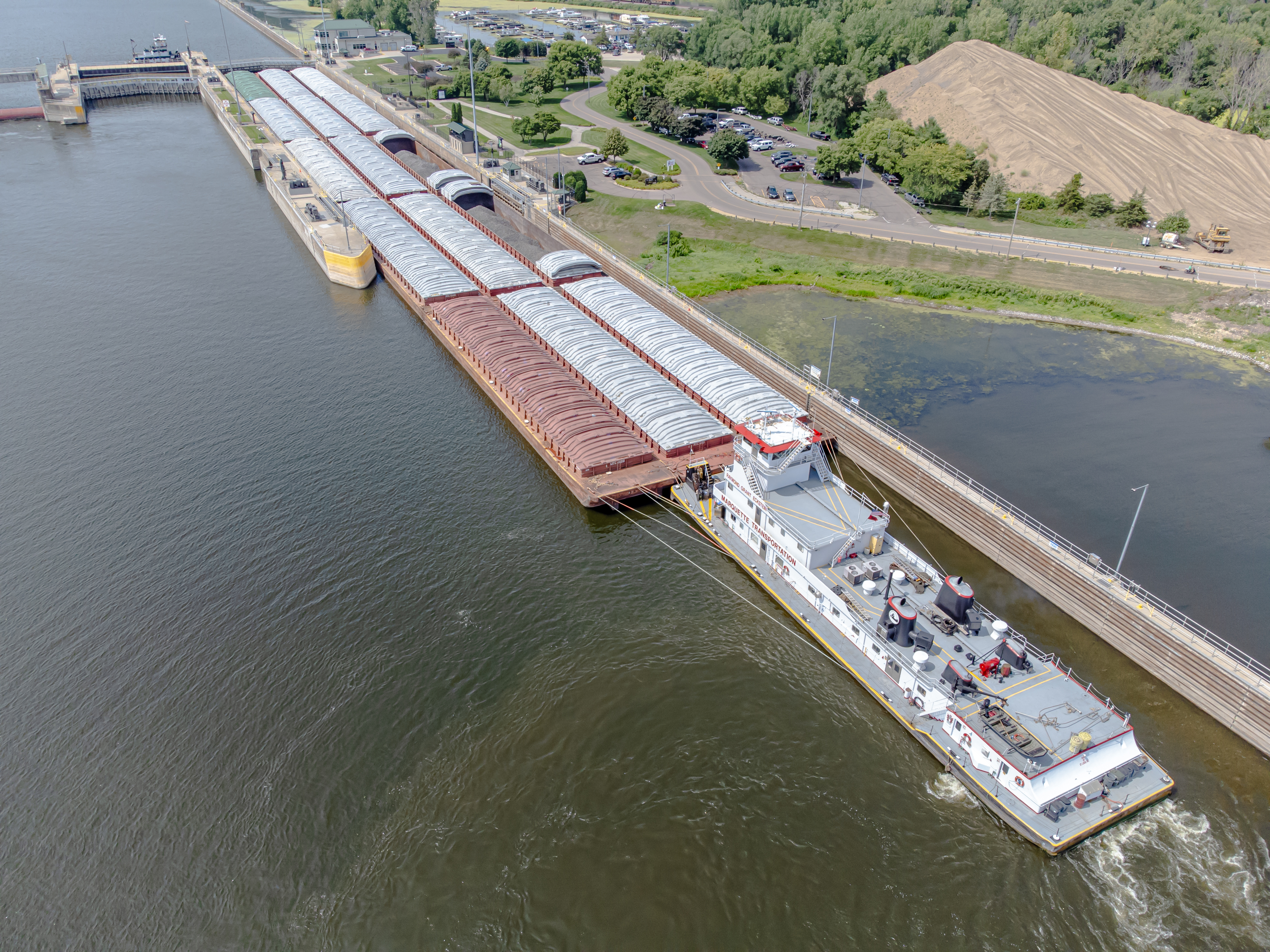
Upper Mississippi River
Lock and Dam No. 6

== See also ==
- Public Works Administration dams list
- Upper Mississippi River National Wildlife and Fish Refuge

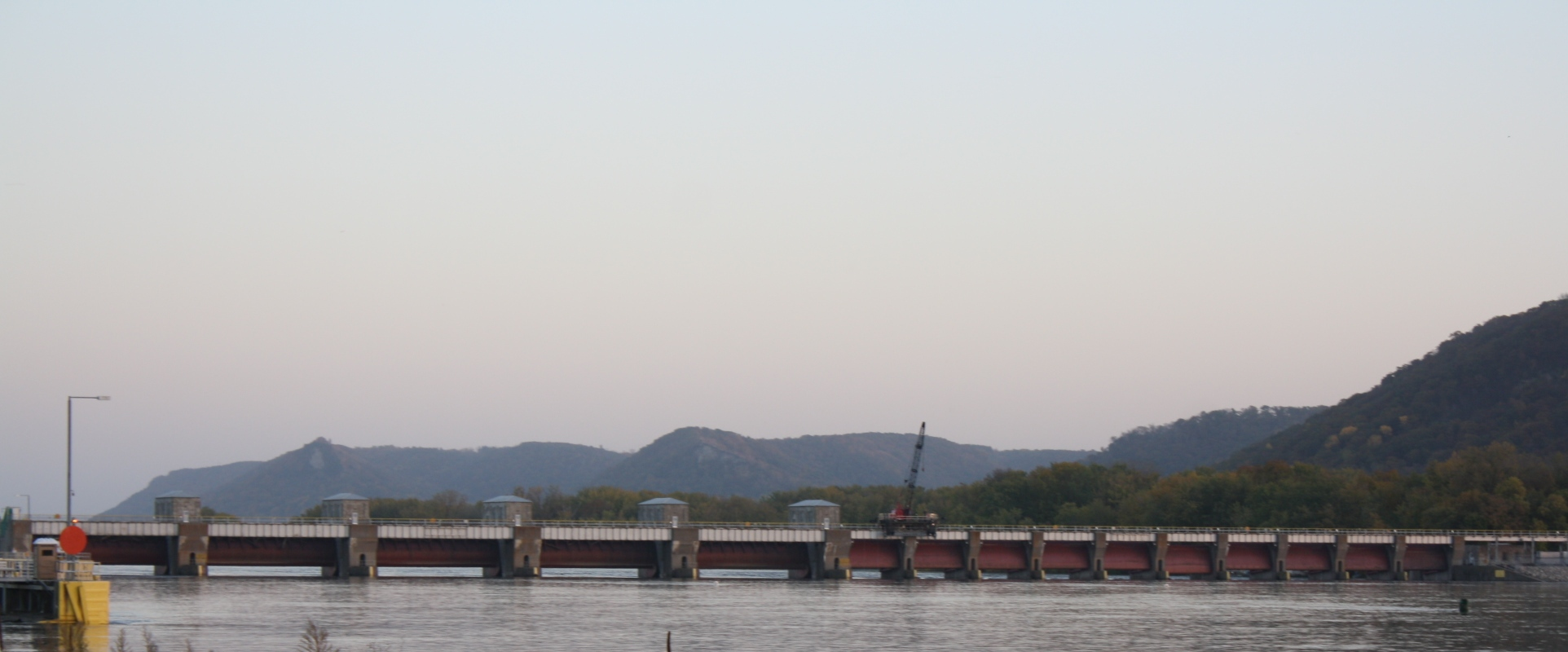
View from downtown Trempealeau, Wisconsin
