= Trempealeau, Wisconsin =

- Village
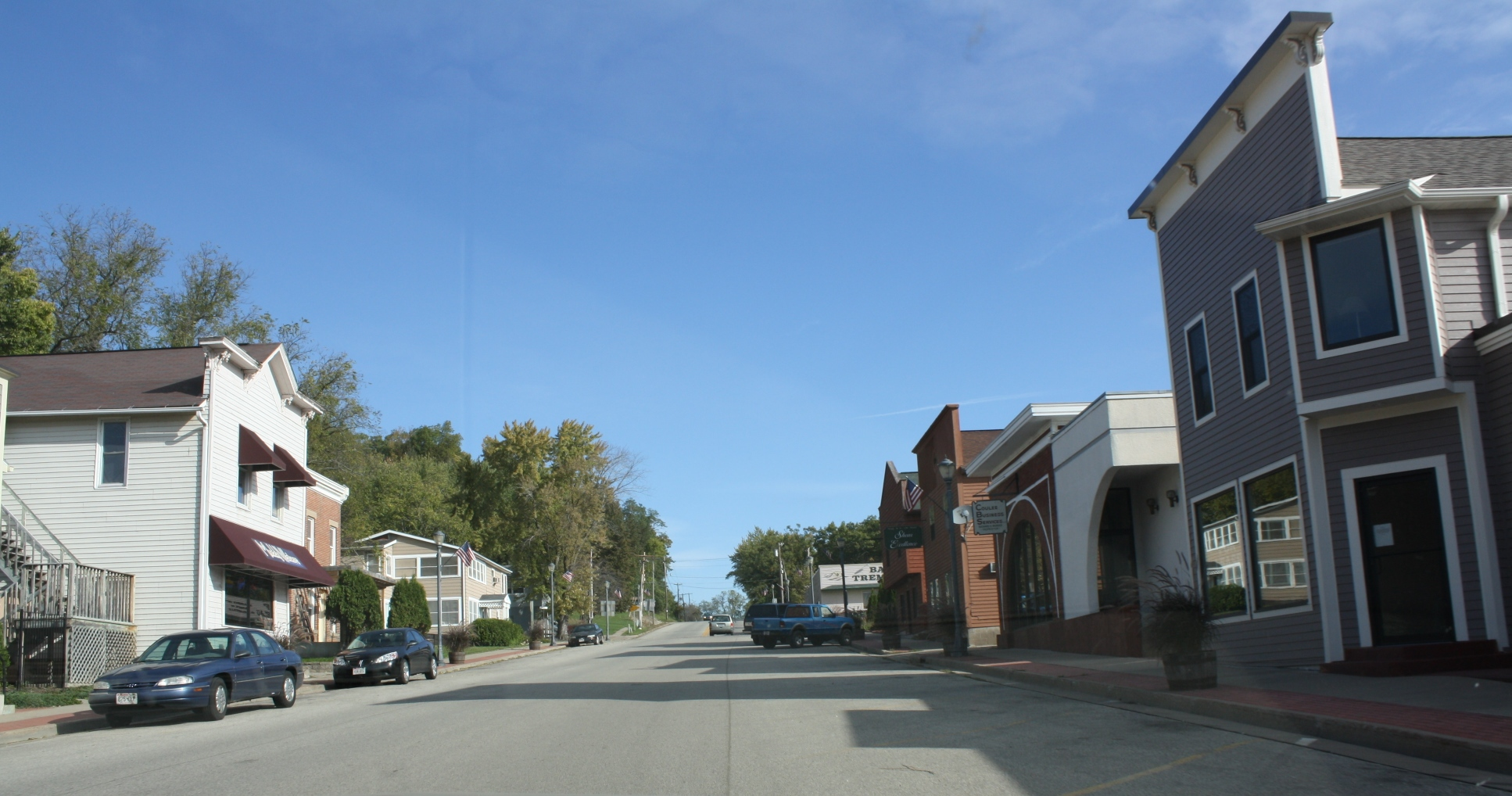
- Looking north at downtown Trempealeau

- Location of Trempealeau in Trempealeau County, Wisconsin.

- Location within Wisconsin Location within the United States
- Coordinates: 44.00791°N 91.43887°W
- Country: United States
- State: Wisconsin
- County: Trempealeau

Area
  - Total: 2.25 sq mi (5.84 km^{2})
  - Land: 1.98 sq mi (5.14 km^{2})
  - Water: 0.27 sq mi (0.70 km^{2})
- Elevation: 738 ft (225 m)

Population (2020)
  - Total: 1,843
  - Density: 929/sq mi (358.6/km^{2})
- Time zone: UTC-6 (Central (CST))
  - Summer (DST): UTC-5 (CDT)
- Area code: 608
- FIPS code: 55-80475
- GNIS feature ID: 1575590
- Website: www.trempealeauwi.gov

Trempealeau (/ˈtrɛmpəloʊ/ TREM-pə-loh) is a village located along the Mississippi River in Trempealeau County in the U.S. state of Wisconsin. The population was 1,843 at the 2020 census. The village is surrounded by the Town of Trempealeau.

== History ==
An ancient Native American site with earthwork mounds, also known as Trempealeau, has been studied near the village through archaeological excavations in the 21st century. It is theorized as a possible mission site or colony of Cahokia, the major center of Mississippian culture from 1000CE to 1450CE located 500 miles to the south in present-day Illinois near St. Louis, Missouri.

Studies have been done through the Mississippi Valley Archaeology Center associated with the University of Wisconsin Madison. Archeologists Danielle Benden and Robert “Ernie” Boszhardt said they have found some evidence of Mississippian settlement about 1050E. The newcomers are believed to have introduced corn culture to the area. The archeology site is slightly downriver of the prominent landmark, Trempealeau Mountain. In 2013 evidence was found of several former structures that exhibited characteristics of Mississippian style. There is some evidence that a religious group came here from Cahokia, perhaps fleeing persecution.

European-American settlement did not take place here until the mid-19th century, although French and English fur traders interacted with Native Americans of the area from the colonial period and into the 19th century. The origin of the present village dates to the 1840s, when settler James Reed established a port and fur trading outpost then known as "Reed's Landing". In 1852, a post office was established and a village was platted, with two alternate names. The initial plat named the village "Montoville", but an alternate plat named the village "Trempealeau". For several years, the village was known as "Montoville-Trempealeau", but formally became "Trempealeau" in 1856.

Both names, "Montoville" and "Trempealeau", were a reference to a distinctive, conical island in the Mississippi River, just upriver from the port of Trempealeau. The Ho Chunk people referred to the island as Hay-nee-ah-chah (mountain soaking in the water); French explorers translated the name as la montagne qui trempe a l'eau.

== Geography ==
Trempealeau is located at 44°0′24″N 91°26′4″W (44.006906, -91.434572).

According to the United States Census Bureau, the village has a total area of 2.25 square miles (5.83 km^{2}), of which, 1.99 square miles (5.15 km^{2}) of it is land and 0.27 square miles (0.70 km^{2}) is water.

=== Climate ===
Climate data for Trempealeau Dam 6, Wisconsin (1991–2020 normals, extremes 1937–present)
Month	Jan	Feb	Mar	Apr	May	Jun	Jul	Aug	Sep	Oct	Nov	Dec	Year
Record high °F (°C)	58 (14)	62 (17)	83 (28)	93 (34)	99 (37)	103 (39)	109 (43)	108 (42)	103 (39)	91 (33)	76 (24)	65 (18)	109 (43)
Mean daily maximum °F (°C)	25.4 (−3.7)	30.2 (−1.0)	42.6 (5.9)	57.2 (14.0)	69.4 (20.8)	78.3 (25.7)	81.9 (27.7)	79.7 (26.5)	72.4 (22.4)	59.1 (15.1)	43.2 (6.2)	30.3 (−0.9)	55.8 (13.2)
Daily mean °F (°C)	16.9 (−8.4)	21.1 (−6.1)	33.4 (0.8)	46.9 (8.3)	58.8 (14.9)	68.4 (20.2)	72.4 (22.4)	70.2 (21.2)	62.5 (16.9)	49.7 (9.8)	35.6 (2.0)	23.0 (−5.0)	46.6 (8.1)
Mean daily minimum °F (°C)	8.5 (−13.1)	12.1 (−11.1)	24.2 (−4.3)	36.7 (2.6)	48.3 (9.1)	58.5 (14.7)	62.8 (17.1)	60.7 (15.9)	52.6 (11.4)	40.4 (4.7)	27.9 (−2.3)	15.7 (−9.1)	37.4 (3.0)
Record low °F (°C)	−44 (−42)	−41 (−41)	−32 (−36)	8 (−13)	24 (−4)	35 (2)	43 (6)	40 (4)	23 (−5)	13 (−11)	−9 (−23)	−33 (−36)	−44 (−42)
Average precipitation inches (mm)	1.12 (28)	1.14 (29)	1.84 (47)	3.68 (93)	4.44 (113)	4.31 (109)	4.63 (118)	4.09 (104)	3.78 (96)	2.59 (66)	1.76 (45)	1.33 (34)	34.71 (882)
Average snowfall inches (cm)	7.4 (19)	10.1 (26)	5.8 (15)	1.7 (4.3)	0.1 (0.25)	0.0 (0.0)	0.0 (0.0)	0.0 (0.0)	0.0 (0.0)	0.0 (0.0)	2.3 (5.8)	8.8 (22)	36.2 (92)
Average precipitation days (≥ 0.01 in)	7.3	6.4	7.5	10.9	12.3	11.8	10.5	9.7	9.4	9.3	7.1	7.8	110.0
Average snowy days (≥ 0.1 in)	4.7	4.3	2.1	0.6	0.0	0.0	0.0	0.0	0.0	0.0	1.4	4.6	17.7
Source: NOAA

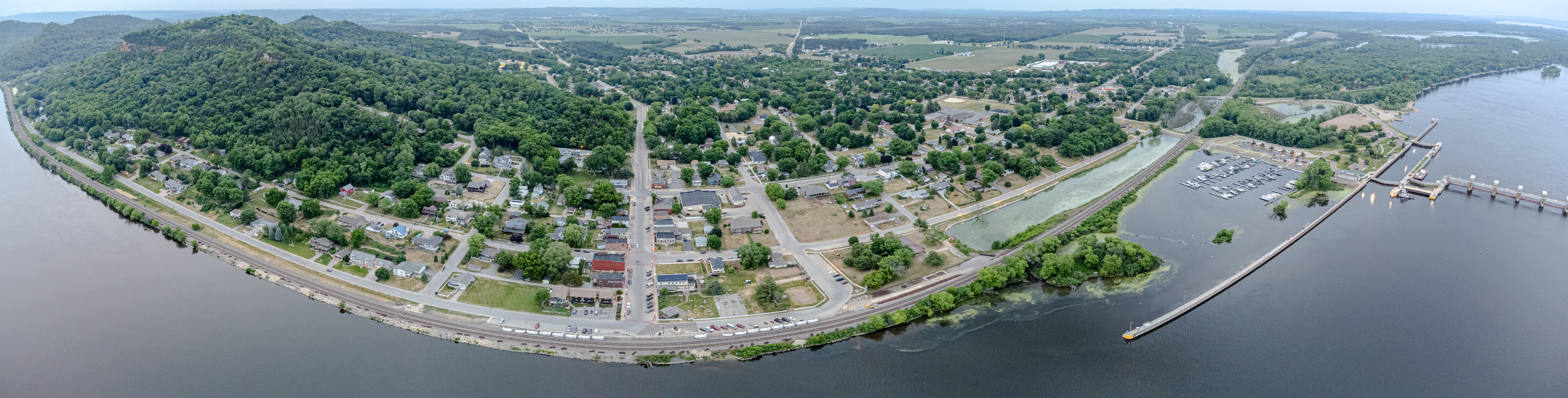

== Demographics ==
Historical population
Census	Pop.	Note	%±
1880	615		—
1900	609		—
1910	535		−12.2%
1920	536		0.2%
1930	541		0.9%
1940	527		−2.6%
1950	645		22.4%
1960	704		9.1%
1970	743		5.5%
1980	956		28.7%
1990	1,039		8.7%
2000	1,319		26.9%
2010	1,529		15.9%
2020	1,843		20.5%
U.S. Decennial Census

=== 2020 census ===
As of the census of 2020, the population was 1,843. The population density was 928.5 inhabitants per square mile (358.5/km^{2}). There were 921 housing units at an average density of 464.0 per square mile (179.2/km^{2}). The racial makeup of the village was 94.0% White, 0.4% Asian, 0.3% Black or African American, 0.2% Native American, 0.5% from other races, and 4.6% from two or more races. Ethnically, the population was 2.0% Hispanic or Latino of any race.

According to the American Community Survey estimates for 2016-2020, the median income for a household in the village was $56,383, and the median income for a family was $67,500. Male full-time workers had a median income of $45,278 versus $32,344 for female workers. The per capita income for the village was $30,328. About 2.7% of families and 4.1% of the population were below the poverty line, including 6.4% of those under age 18 and 3.6% of those age 65 or over. Of the population age 25 and over, 98.3% were high school graduates or higher and 20.8% had a bachelor's degree or higher.

=== 2010 census ===
As of the census of 2010, there were 1,529 people, 704 households, and 426 families residing in the village. The population density was 817.6 inhabitants per square mile (315.7/km^{2}). There were 835 housing units at an average density of 446.5 per square mile (172.4/km^{2}). The racial makeup of the village was 97.8% White, 0.1% African American, 0.4% Native American, 0.4% Asian, 0.3% from other races, and 1.0% from two or more races. Hispanic or Latino of any race were 1.4% of the population.

There were 704 households, of which 27.3% had children under the age of 18 living with them, 47.7% were married couples living together, 8.2% had a female householder with no husband present, 4.5% had a male householder with no wife present, and 39.5% were non-families. 33.2% of all households were made up of individuals, and 13.6% had someone living alone who was 65 years of age or older. The average household size was 2.17 and the average family size was 2.74.

The median age in the village was 42.7 years. 20.9% of residents were under the age of 18; 6.4% were between the ages of 18 and 24; 26.7% were from 25 to 44; 28.8% were from 45 to 64; and 17.1% were 65 years of age or older. The gender makeup of the village was 49.8% male and 50.2% female.

== Notable people ==
- Gideon Winans Allen, Wisconsin State Representative
- Robert Grimes Coman, U.S. Navy Commodore
- Charles Kenneth Leith, geologist
- Todd Auer, NFL Pro Football Player

== Images ==
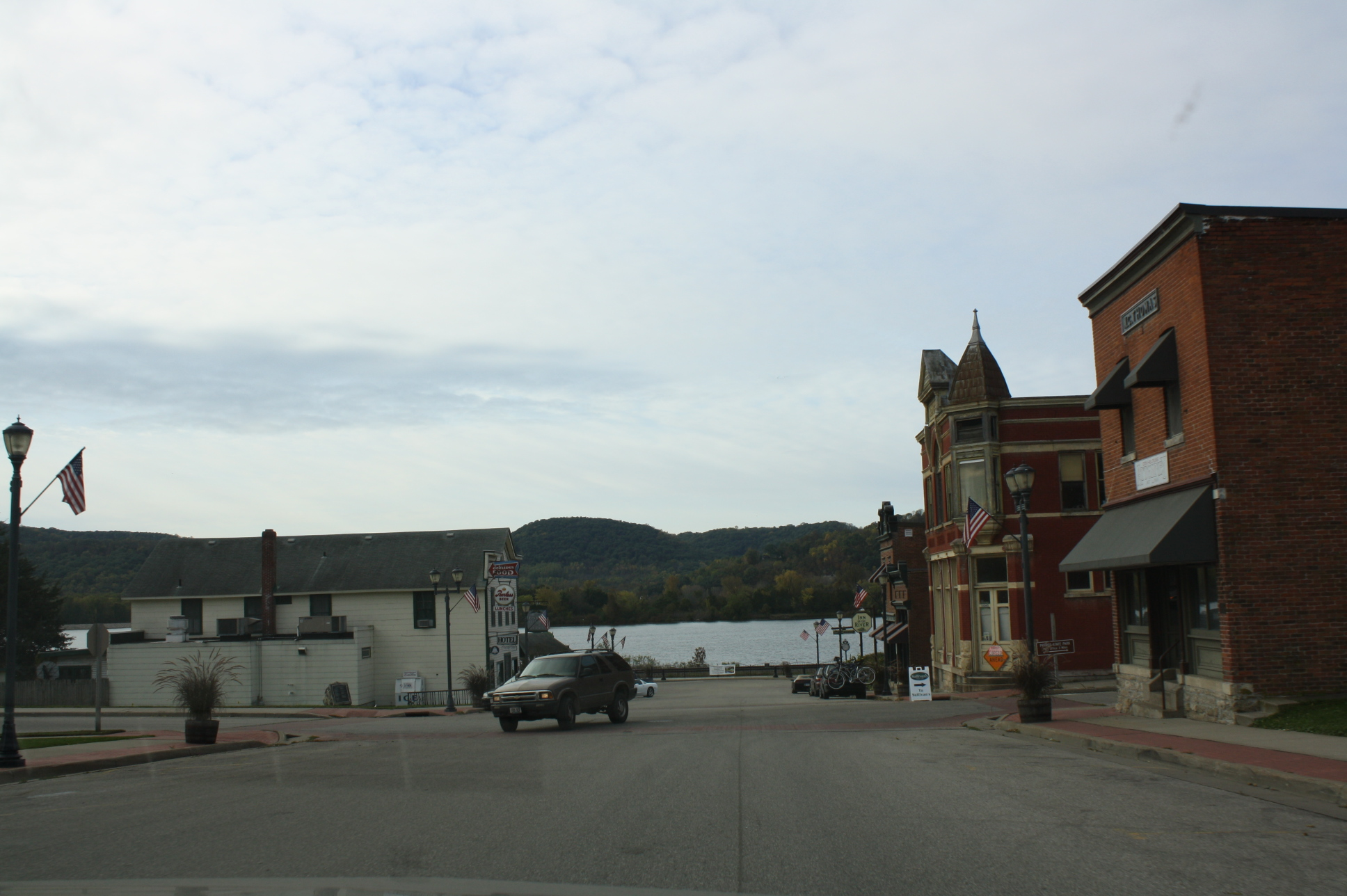
Looking south at downtown Trempealeau, part of the Main Street Historic District, Mississippi River in background

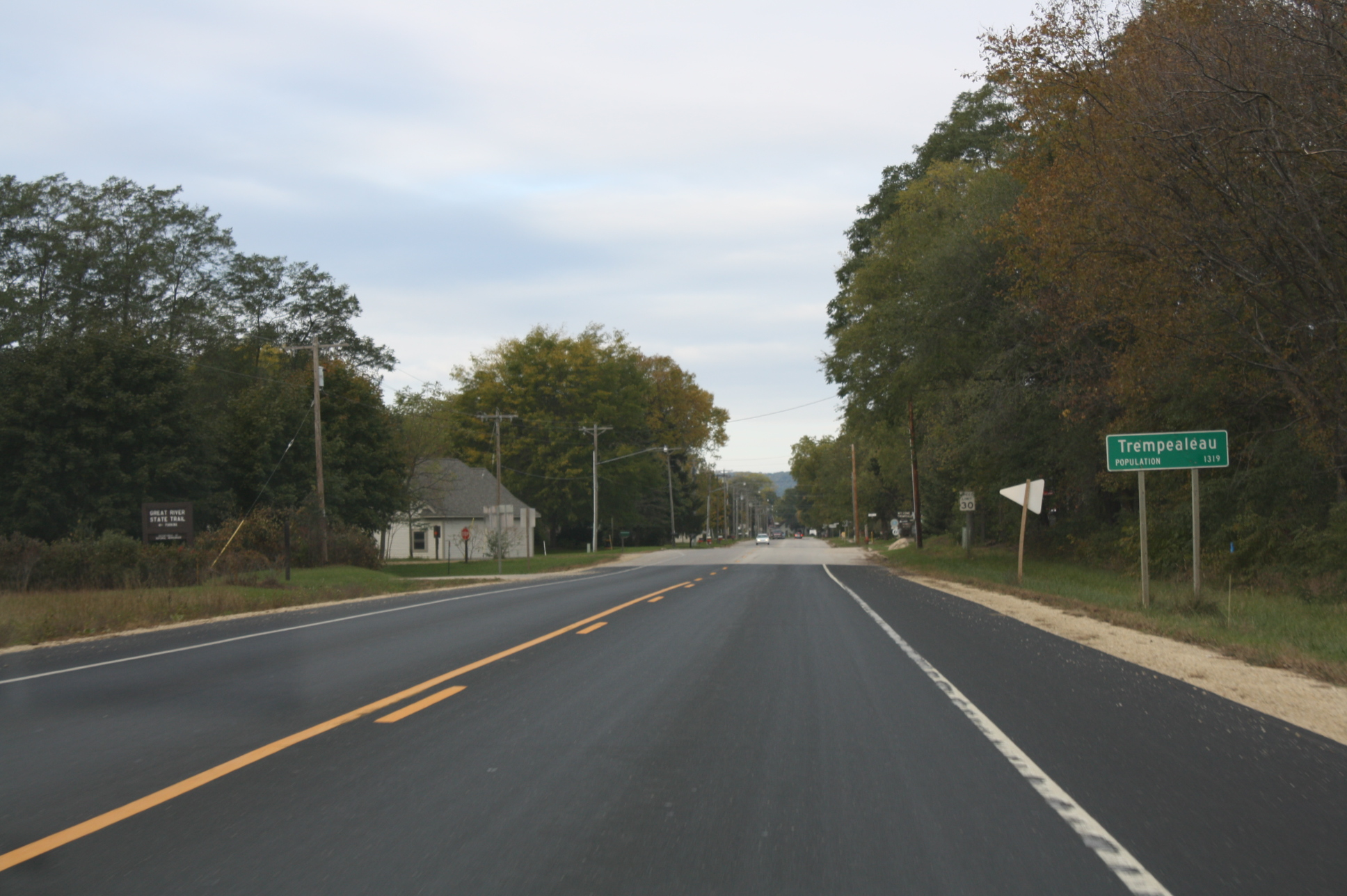
Looking west at the population sign along WIS 35

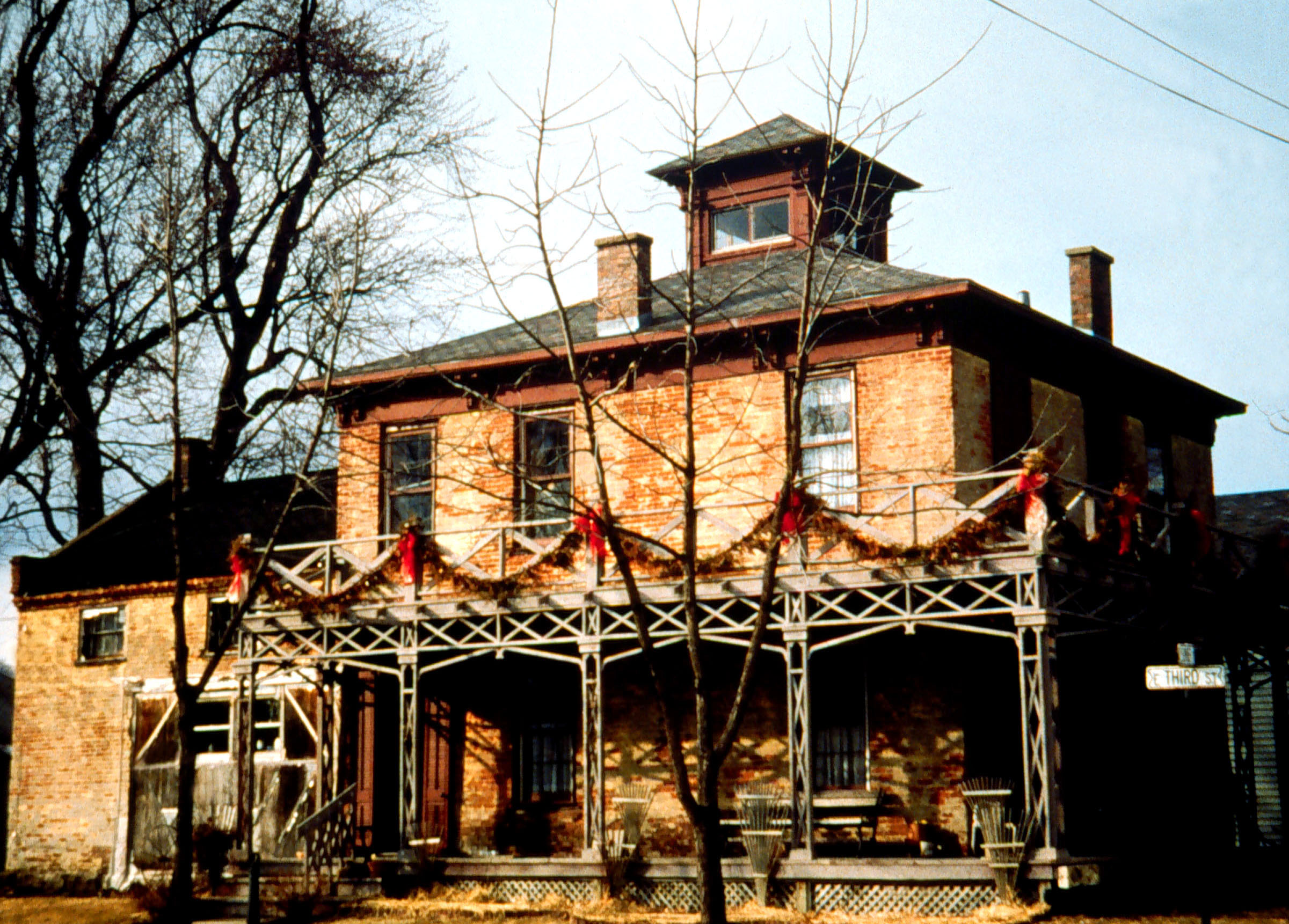
Coman House, built in the 1860s in Trempealeau

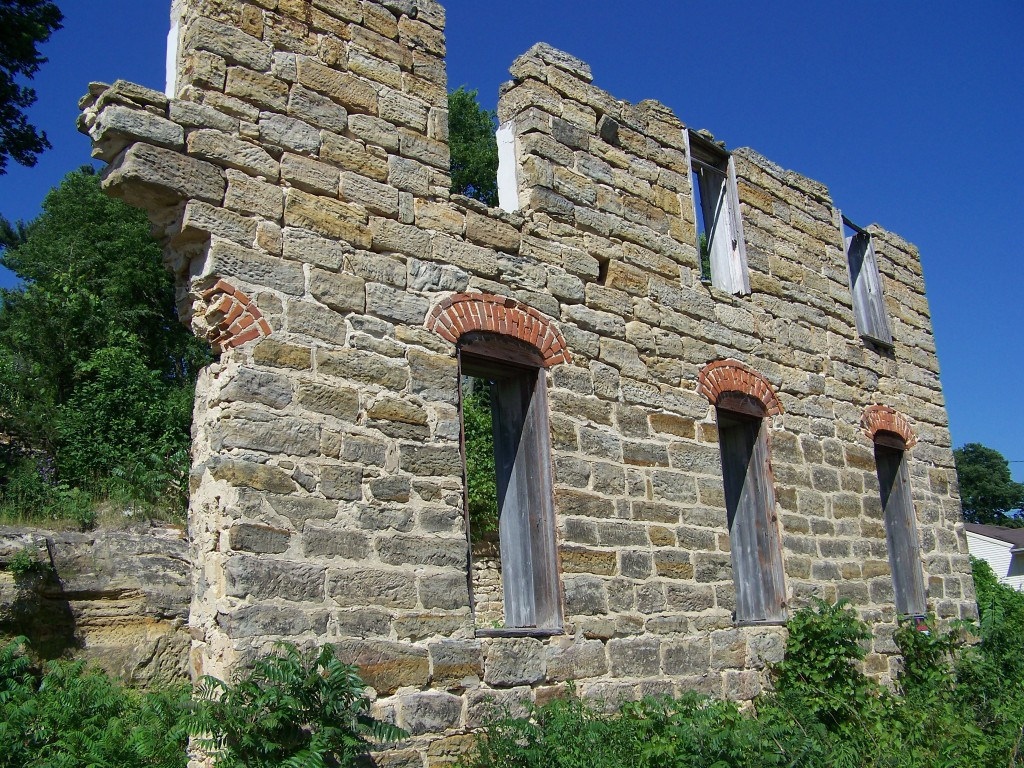
Melchoir House ruins on the outskirts of Trempealeau

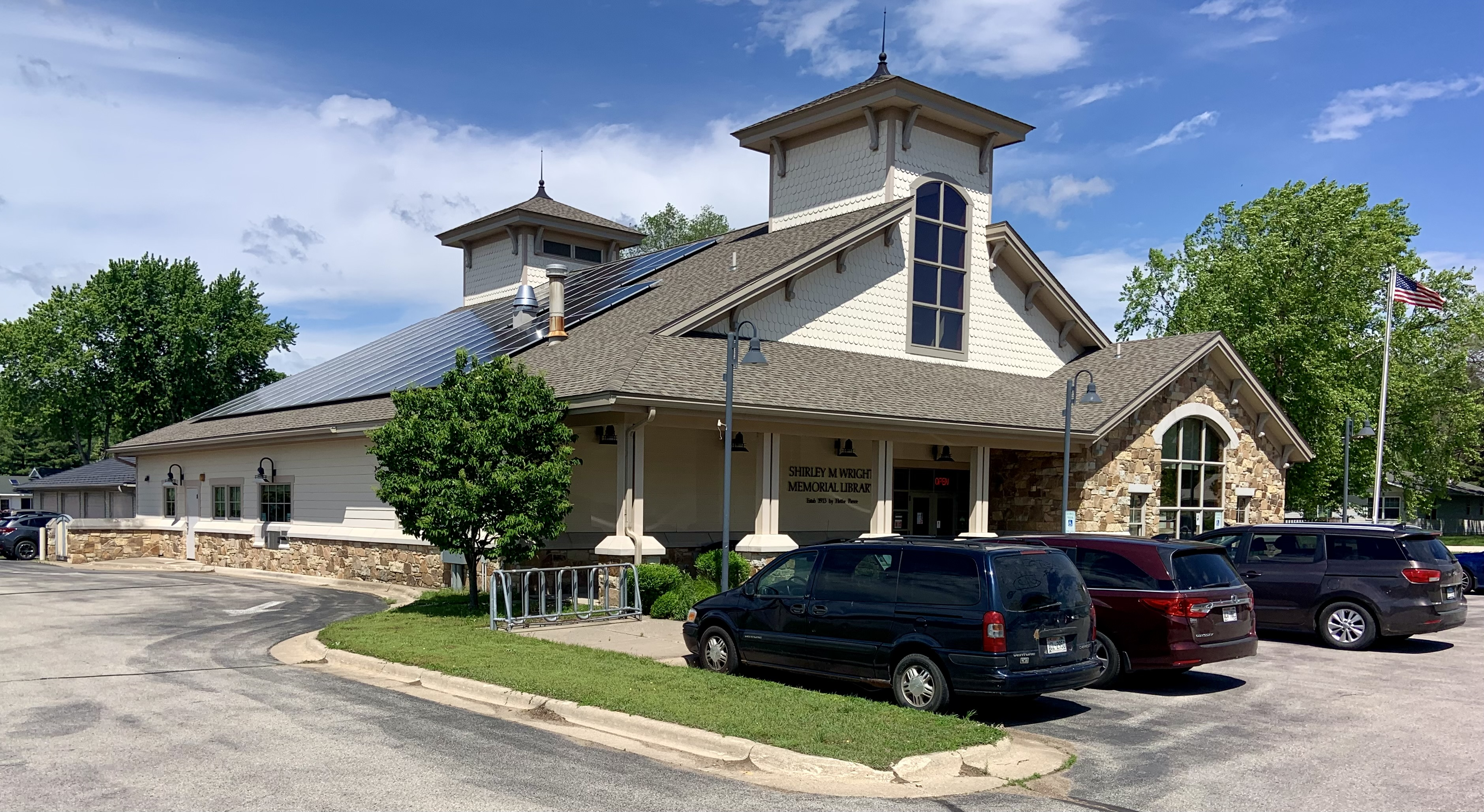
Trempealeau Library

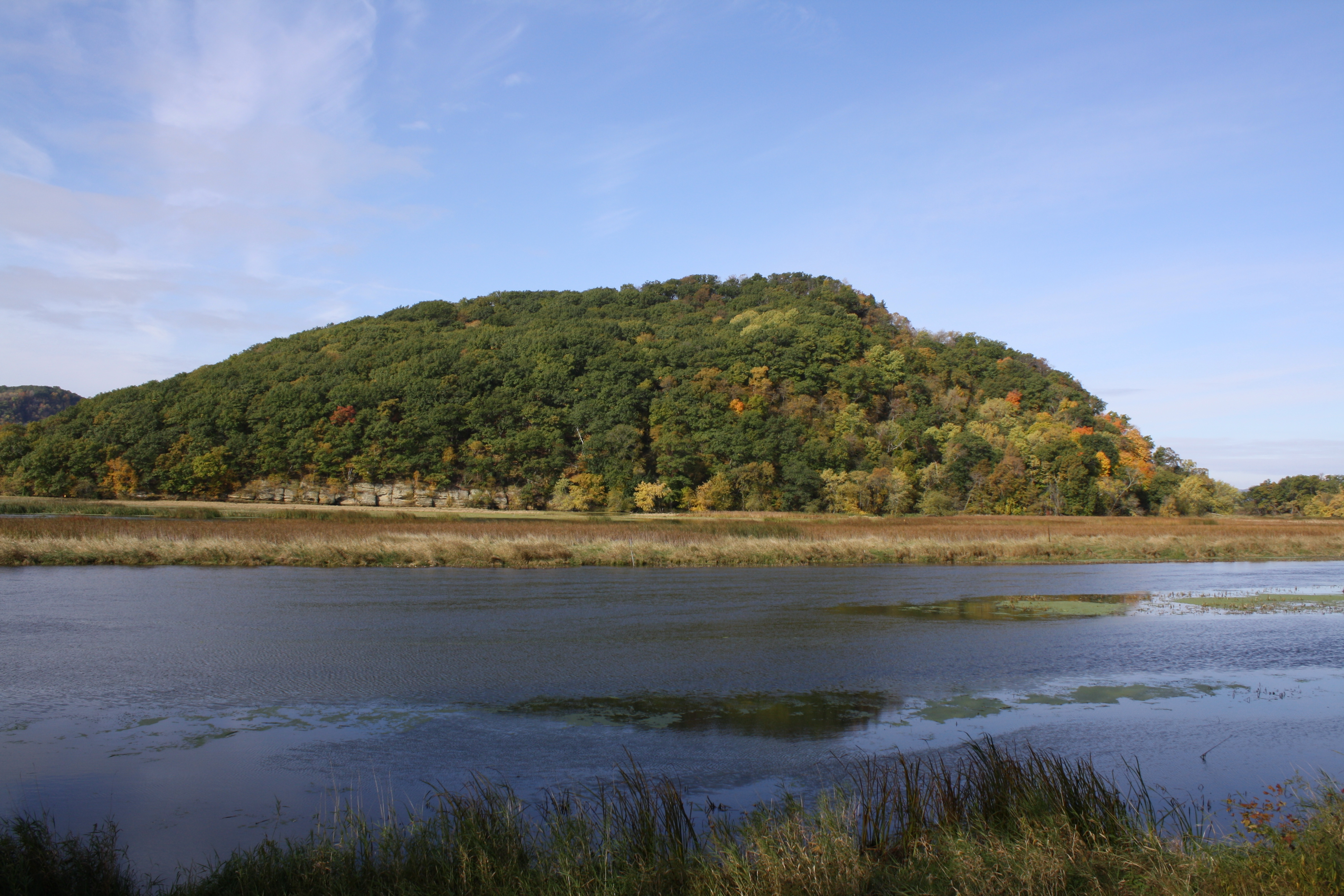
Trempealeau Mountain at Perrot State Park

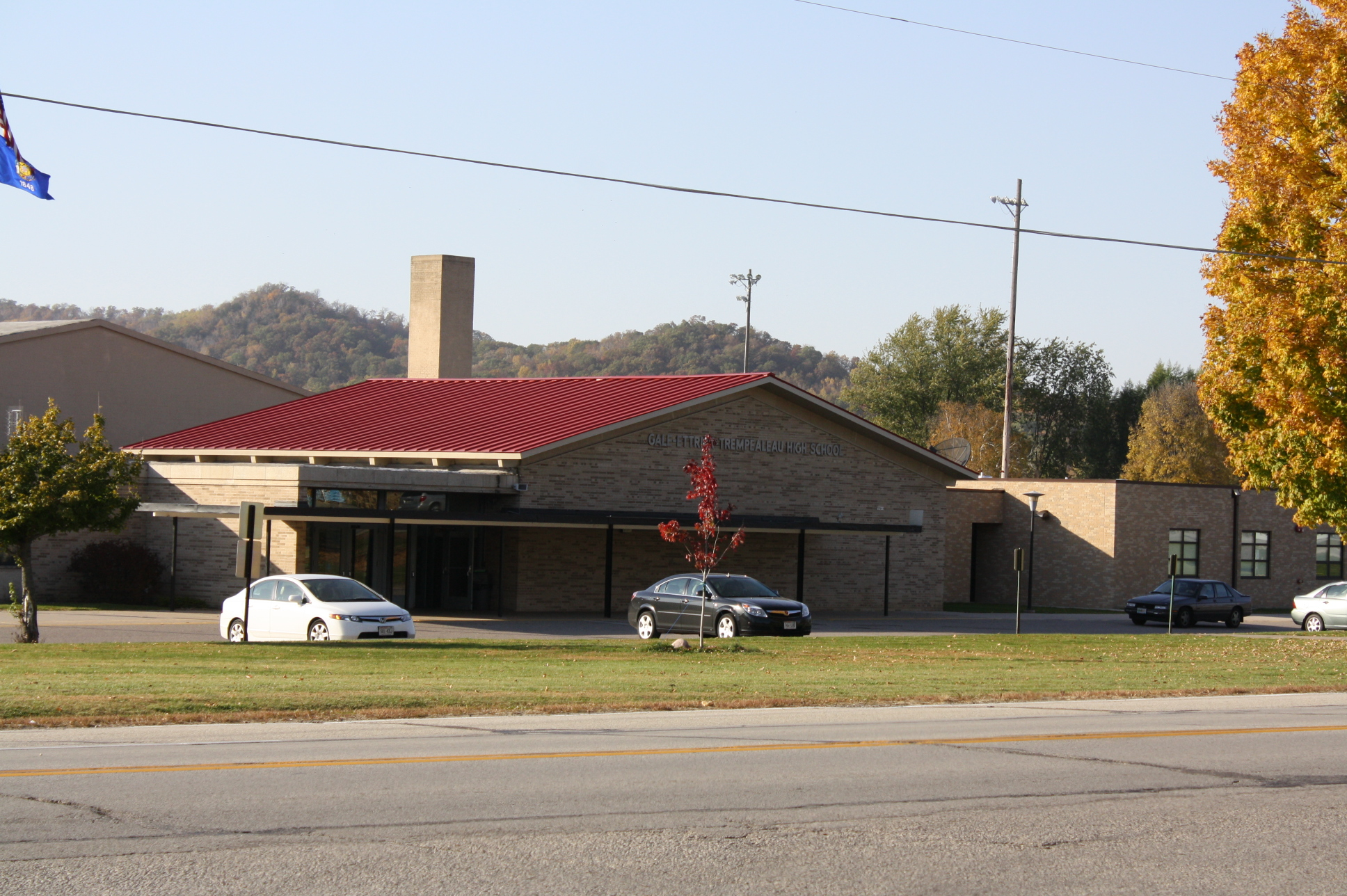
Gale-Ettrick-Trempealeau High School in Galesville

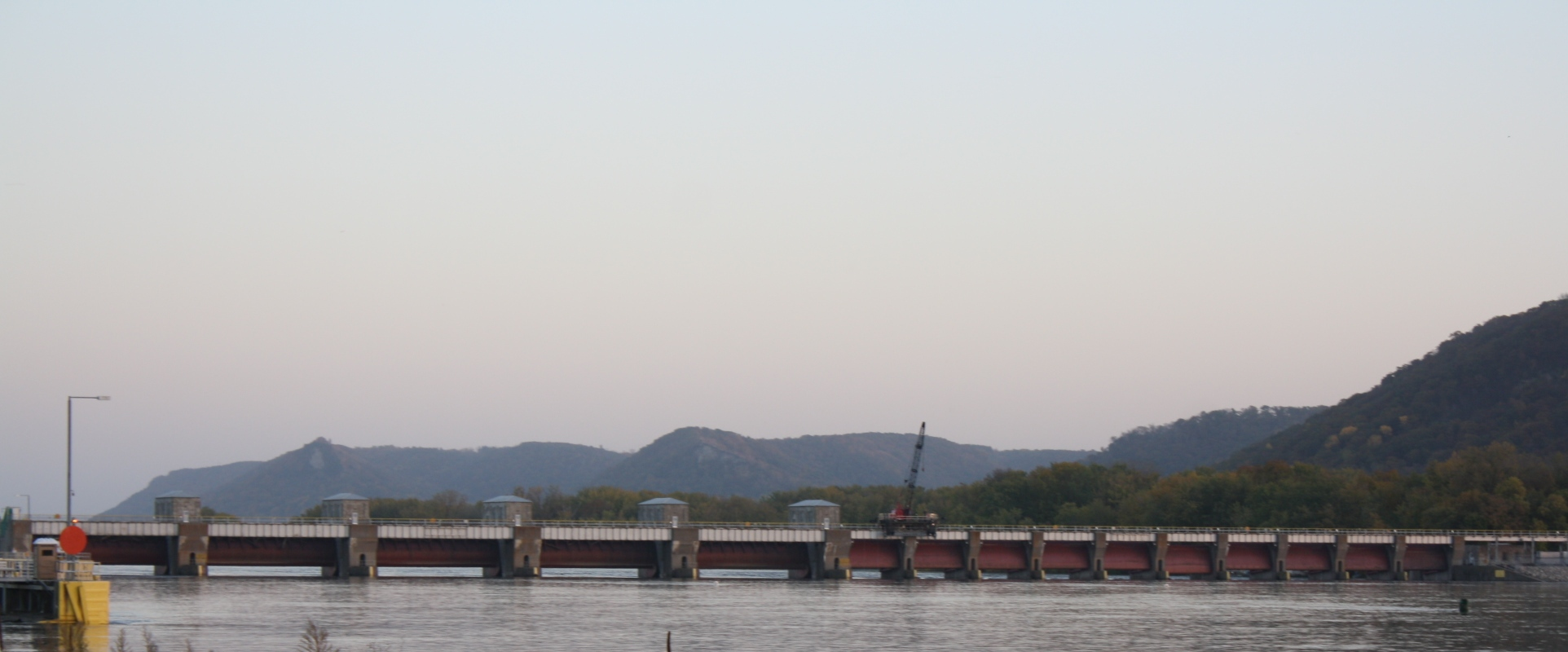
Lock and Dam No. 6

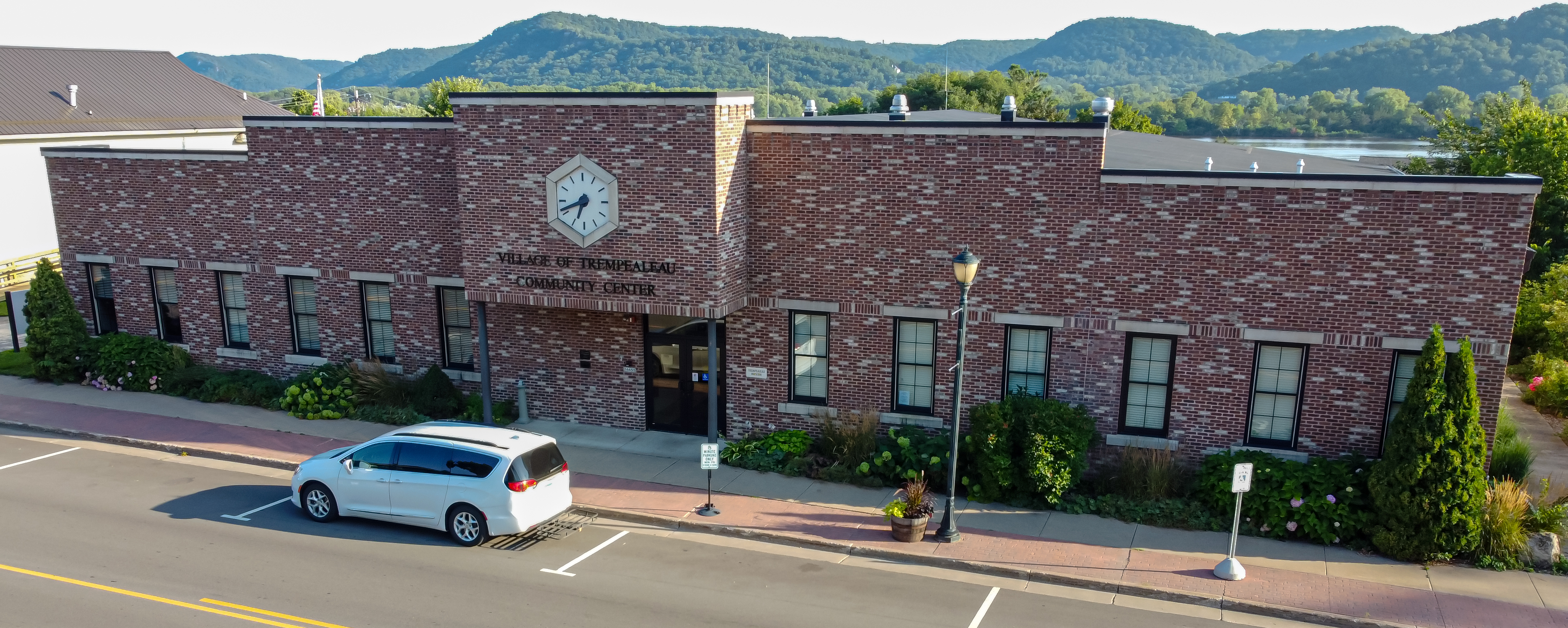
Trempealeau Village Hall

== See also ==
- Trempealeau Mountain State Natural Area
