= Ridge Avenue Historic District (Galesville, Wisconsin) =

Historic district in Wisconsin, United States

- U.S. National Register of Historic Places
- U.S. Historic district
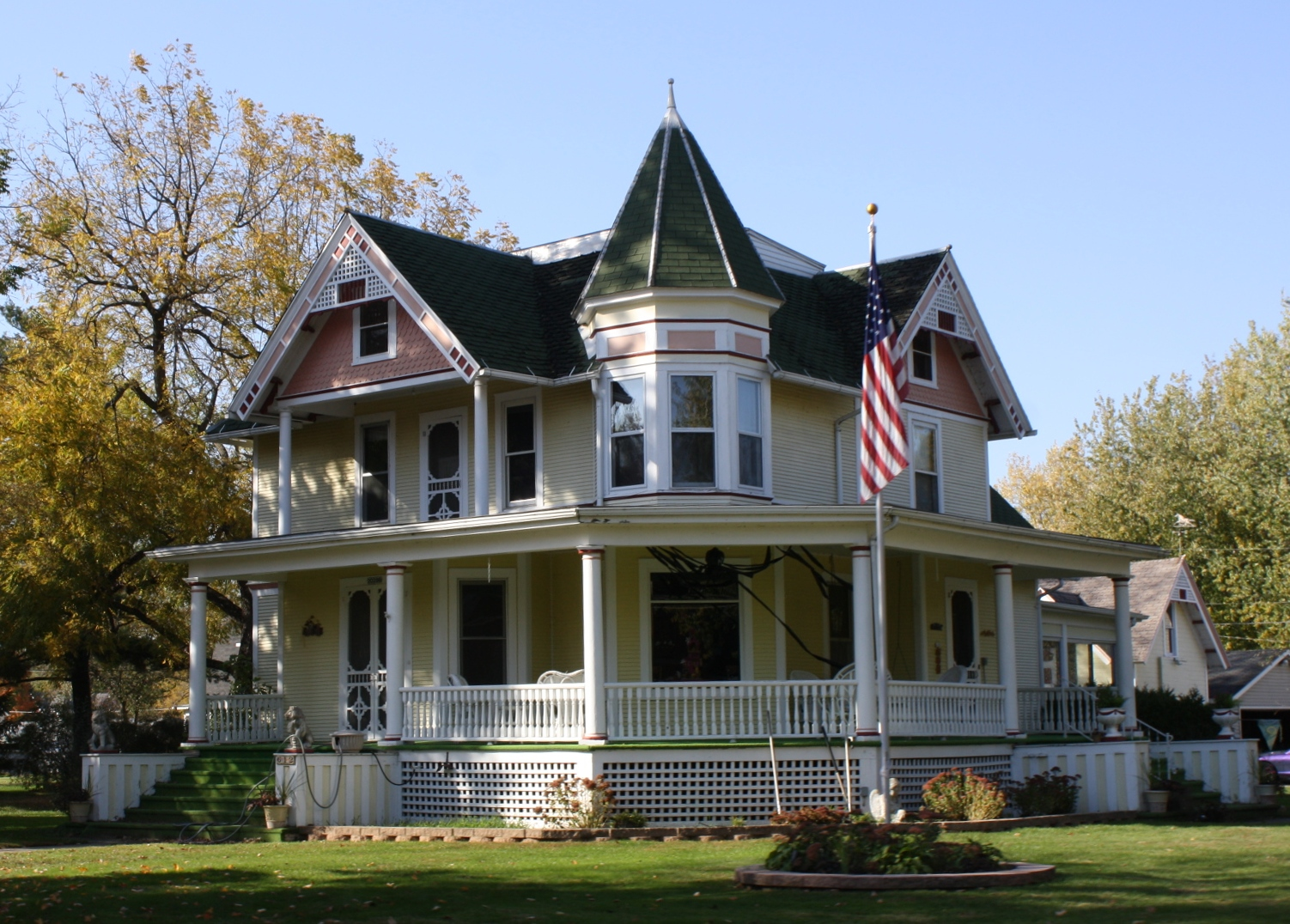
- Ralph Myhre house at 5th and West Ridge in the district

- Location within Wisconsin Location within the United States
- Location: primarily Ridge Avenue between 4th and 6th Streets, Galesville, Wisconsin
- Coordinates: 44°05′01″N 91°21′18″W
- Area: 5 acres (2.0 ha)
- Architect: Multiple
- Architectural style: Queen Anne, Italianate, Stick
- MPS: Galesville MRA
- NRHP reference No.: 84003792
- Added to NRHP: September 18, 1984

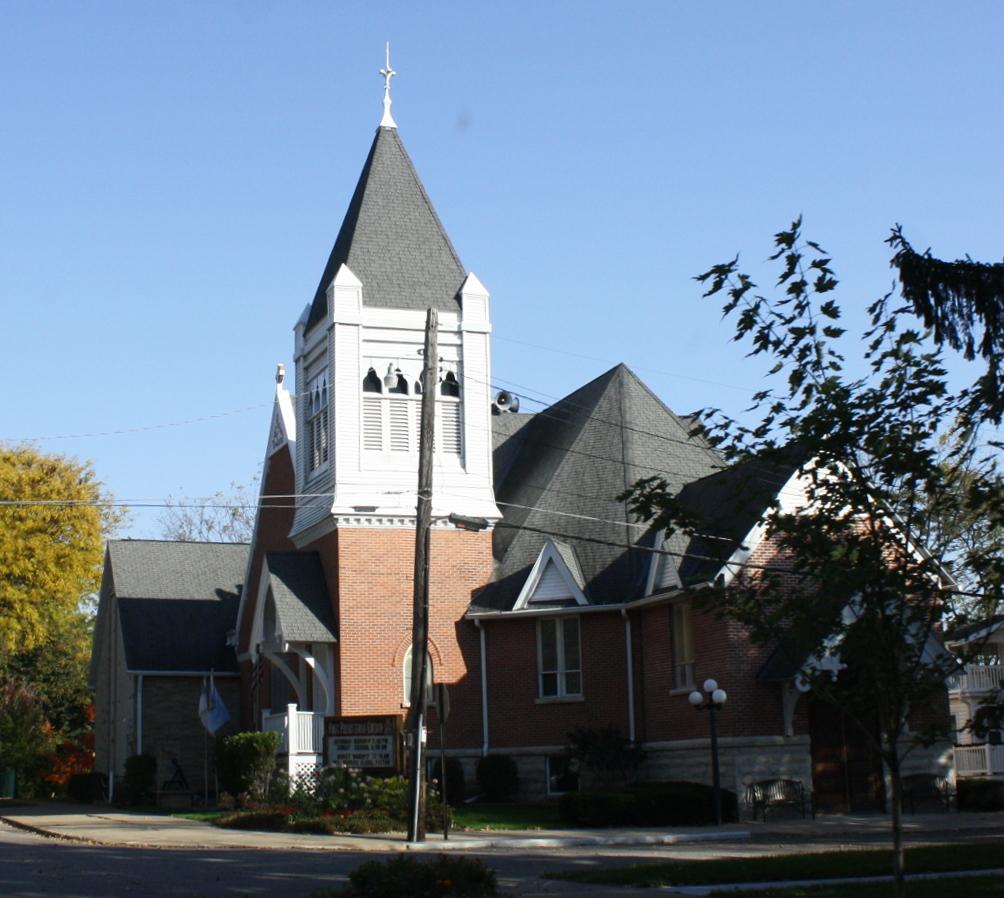
The First Presbyterian Church, a contributing property

The Ridge Avenue Historic District in Galesville, Wisconsin is a 5 acres (2.0 ha) historic district which was added to the National Register of Historic Places in 1984. The district contains eleven contributing properties; they are primarily located on Ridge Avenue between 4th and 6th Streets. The district was added for its architectural importance; it features buildings with Italian, Queen Anne, and other architectural styles dated between 1859 and 1934. The John F. Cance House is located near the district at 807 West Ridge Avenue.

The finest three Queen Anne-style houses in the district are:

- W.S. Wadleigh House (1908), 625 W. Ridge Ave., a two-story asymmetrical house with a round turret with a conical roof, with two octagonal bay windows, and with a wraparound porch. It was built for W.S. Wadleigh, a lawyer and nine-times mayor of Galesville.
- Ole F. Myhre House, 612 W. Ridge Ave., a two and one-half story house, also with a turret having a conical roof, with gable ends with bargeboards, with a contributing carriage house. It was built for Ole F. Myhre, co-founder of the successful Gilbertson-Myhre department store downtown.
- John A. Berg House (1914), 524 W. Ridge Ave., a two-and-a-half-story red brick Queen Anne-eclectic style house with Craftsman and Jacobean influences. This was built for John A. Berg, "founder of the Galesville Building and Realty Company, Director of the Farmer's and Merchant's Bank, local politician, and one-time president of the Gale College Board of Trustees."
