= John Bohrnstedt House =

Historic house in Wisconsin, United States

- U.S. National Register of Historic Places
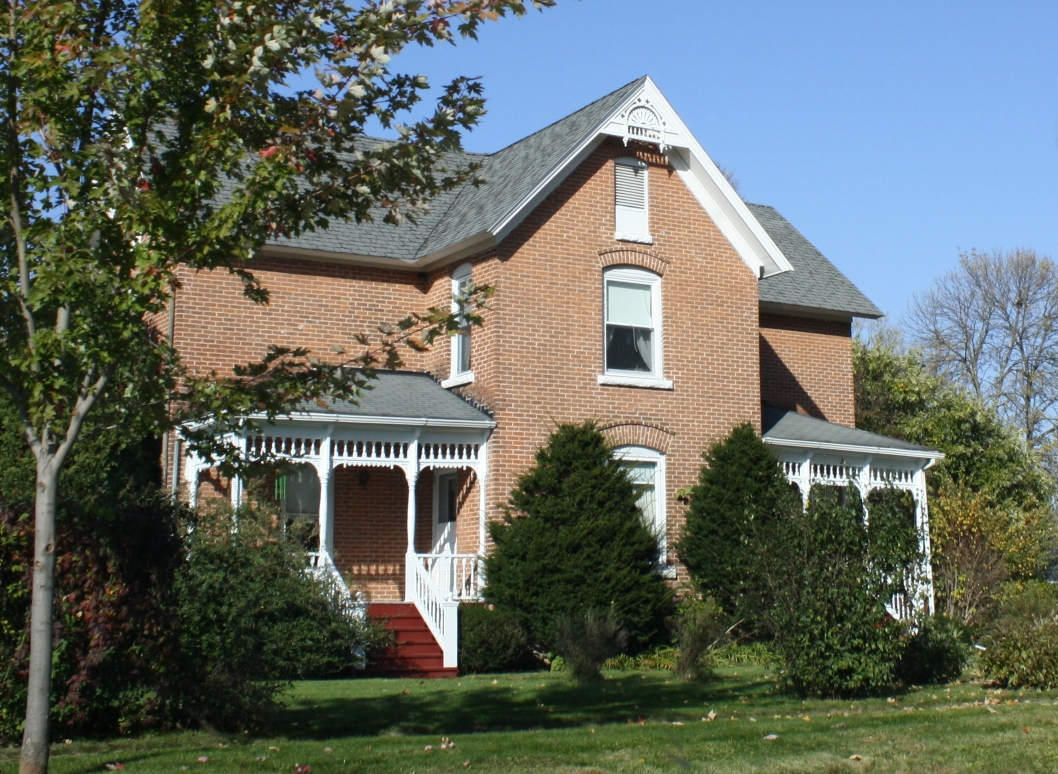

- Location within Wisconsin Location within the United States
- Location: 830 Clark St. Galesville, Wisconsin
- Coordinates: 44°50′50″N 91°21′36″W
- Built: 1901
- NRHP reference No.: 84003788
- Added to NRHP: September 18, 1984

The John Bohrnstedt House is a historic house located in Galesville, Wisconsin, USA.

John Bohrenstedt (1833–1909) was a German immigrant. He was a farmer and stakeholder in the Bank of Galesville.

It was added to the National Register of Historic Places on September 18, 1984.
