= USS Farquhar (DD-304) =

Clemson-class destroyer of the United States Navy

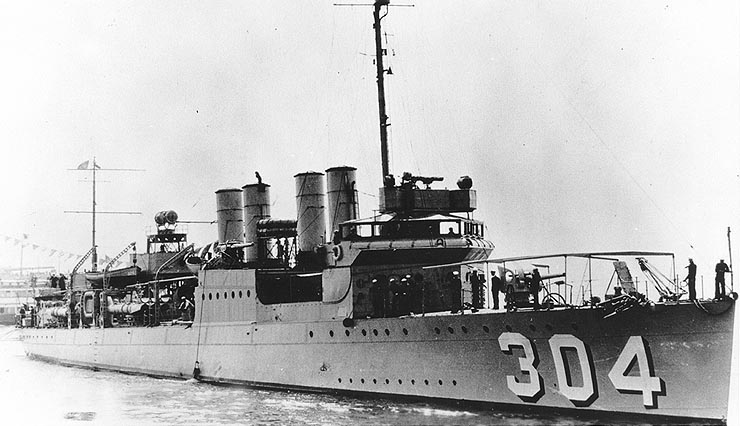
- USS Farquhar (DD-304)

History

United States
- Namesake: Norman von Heldreich Farquhar
- Builder: Bethlehem Shipbuilding Corporation, Union Iron Works, San Francisco
- Laid down: 13 August 1918
- Launched: 18 January 1919
- Commissioned: 5 August 1920
- Decommissioned: 20 February 1930
- Stricken: 18 November 1930
- Fate: Sold for scrapping, 23 April 1932

General characteristics
- Class & type: Clemson-class destroyer
- Displacement: 1,290 long tons (1,311 t) (standard); 1,389 long tons (1,411 t) (deep load)
- Length: 314 ft 4 in (95.8 m)
- Beam: 30 ft 11 in (9.42 m)
- Draught: 10 ft 3 in (3.1 m)
- Installed power: 27,000 shp (20,000 kW); 4 water-tube boilers
- Propulsion: 2 shafts, 2 steam turbines
- Speed: 35 knots (65 km/h; 40 mph) (design)
- Range: 2,500 nautical miles (4,600 km; 2,900 mi) at 20 knots (37 km/h; 23 mph) (design)
- Complement: 6 officers, 108 enlisted men
- Armament: 4 × single 4-inch (102 mm) guns; 2 × single 1-pounder AA guns or; 2 × single 3-inch (76 mm) guns; 4 × triple 21 inch (533 mm) torpedo tubes; 2 × depth charge rails

USS Farquhar (DD-304) was a Clemson-class destroyer built for the United States Navy during World War I.

== Description ==
The Clemson class was a repeat of the preceding Wickes class although more fuel capacity was added. The ships displaced 1,290 long tons (1,311 t) at standard load and 1,389 long tons (1,411 t) at deep load. They had an overall length of 314 feet 4 inches (95.8 m), a beam of 30 feet 11 inches (9.4 m) and a draught of 10 feet 3 inches (3.1 m). They had a crew of 6 officers and 108 enlisted men.

Performance differed radically between the ships of the class, often due to poor workmanship. The Clemson class was powered by two steam turbines, each driving one propeller shaft, using steam provided by four water-tube boilers. The turbines were designed to produce a total of 27,000 shaft horsepower (20,000 kW) intended to reach a speed of 35 knots (65 km/h; 40 mph). The ships carried a maximum of 371 long tons (377 t) of fuel oil which was intended gave them a range of 2,500 nautical miles (4,600 km; 2,900 mi) at 20 knots (37 km/h; 23 mph).

The ships were armed with four 4-inch (102 mm) guns in single mounts and were fitted with two 1-pounder guns for anti-aircraft defense. In many ships a shortage of 1-pounders caused them to be replaced by 3-inch (76 mm) guns. Their primary weapon, though, was their torpedo battery of a dozen 21 inch (533 mm) torpedo tubes in four triple mounts. They also carried a pair of depth charge rails. A "Y-gun" depth charge thrower was added to many ships.

== Construction and career ==
Farquhar, named for Norman von Heldreich Farquhar, was launched 18 January 1919 by Union Iron Works, San Francisco; sponsored by Mrs. J. Reed; and commissioned 5 August 1920.

From her home port, San Diego, where she first arrived 26 August 1920, Farquhar operated with the Pacific Fleet in training, maneuvers, and war problems along the west coast from the coast of Washington state to the Panama Canal Zone. In August 1921, she rescued 42 passengers of SS San Jose, stranded off the coast of Mexico. In 1924 and 1927, she joined in fleet concentrations in the Caribbean, and during the second cruise, sailed north to visit New York, Newport, Rhode Island and Norfolk, before returning to San Diego.

Farquhar sailed to Hawaii on maneuvers in April 1925, and joined a large force for a cruise to Samoa, Australia, and New Zealand, returning to the west coast in September. April through June 1928 again found her in the Hawaiian Islands for exercises of the complete Battle Fleet. She carried reservists for training in July 1929, and the next month began inactivation at San Diego. Farquhar was decommissioned 20 February 1930, and after temporary service as a barracks ship for submariners, was scrapped in accordance with the London Treaty limiting naval armaments. The scrapped materials were sold 23 April 1932.
