= Main Street Historic District (Trempealeau, Wisconsin) =

Historic district in Wisconsin, United States

- U.S. National Register of Historic Places
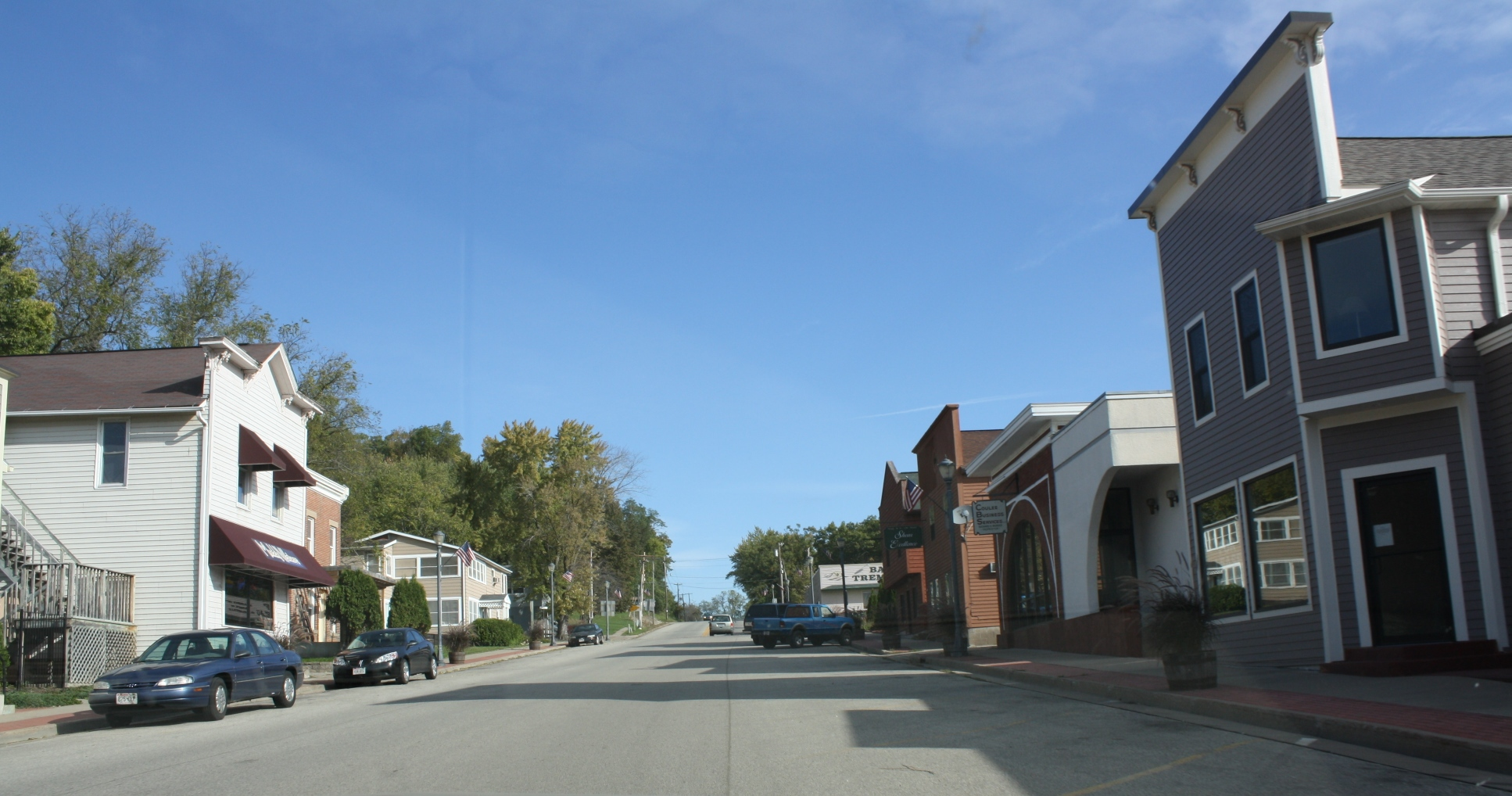
- A portion of the district.
- Location: Roughly Main St. between 1st and 3rd Sts., Trempealeau, Wisconsin
- Area: 1.6 acres (0.65 ha)
- MPS: Trempealeau MRA
- NRHP reference No.: 84000763
- Added to NRHP: November 15, 1984

The Main Street Historic District is located in Trempealeau, Wisconsin. Buildings within range from wooden Boomtown-style stores built around 1880 to the 1888 Queen Anne E. J. Hankey General Store, to the 1912 Prairie School Citizens State Bank, to Dr. Pierce's office, built in 1915.
