= Coman House =

Historic house in Wisconsin, United States

- U.S. National Register of Historic Places
- The house in 2019

- Location within Wisconsin Location within the United States
- Location: 581 3rd St. Trempealeau, Wisconsin
- Coordinates: 44°0′15″N 91°26′3″W
- Area: less than one acre
- Built: c. 1865–1870
- Architectural style: Italianate
- NRHP reference No.: 84000747
- Added to NRHP: November 15, 1984

The Coman House is a historic house located in Trempealeau, Wisconsin. It is locally significant as the best example of the Italianate style in the village. It was the first brick house built in the community.

== Description and history ==
Helen Coman purchased the house in 1862 at which time no structured existed on the lot. The house, built sometime between 1865 and 1870, is a two-story, brick rectangular structure designed in the Italianate style with a 1 1/2-story wing. It was added to the National Register of Historic Places in 1984. It was added to the State Register in 1989.

Its hipped roof is surmounted by a cupola, which has paired brackets and pilasters.
