= John F. Cance House =

Historic house in Wisconsin, United States

- U.S. National Register of Historic Places
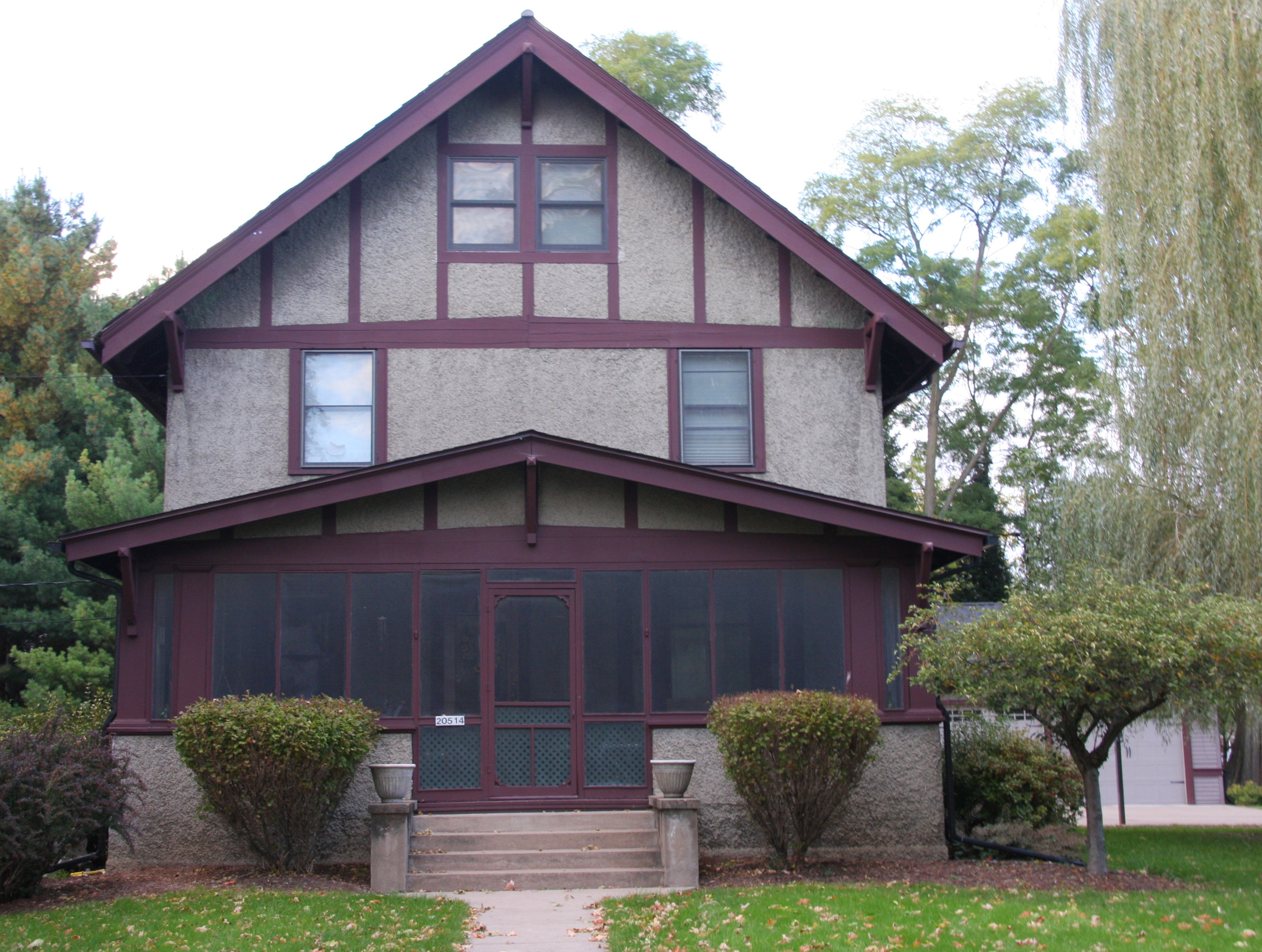
- The house in 2016

- Location within Wisconsin Location within the United States
- Location: 807 West Ridge Avenue, Galesville, Wisconsin
- Coordinates: 44°4′59″N 91°20′48″W
- Area: less than 1 acre (0.40 ha)
- Built: 1908
- Architect: Carsley, G. H.; Cass-Gilbert
- Architectural style: Tudor Revival
- MPS: Galesville MRA
- NRHP reference No.: 84003790
- Added to NRHP: September 18, 1984

The John F. Cance House at 807 W. Ridge Ave. in Galesville, Wisconsin was built in 1908.

It was listed on the National Register of Historic Places in 1984.

The house was designed by architect G.H. Carsley. Carsley was a member of the architect Cass Gilbert's office in St. Paul from 1896 to 1906 and possibly longer; though the house was not necessarily associated with Gilbert's firm, its progressive design is typical of the office. The home displays Tudor Revival architecture.

The house has a separate carriage house, which contributes to its National Register listing. The house is the only prominent Tudor Revival building in Galesville; while its architecture is not considered exceptional in its own right, its uniqueness and connection to the Cass Gilbert office make it historically significant nonetheless.

The house's first owner, John F. Cance, was a prominent banker at the Bank of Galesville. He was a cashier for the bank when the house was built and continued to rise in the bank until he became bank president in 1930, a position he held for 23 years.
