= National Register of Historic Places listings in Buffalo County, Wisconsin =

Location of Buffalo County in Wisconsin

This is a list of the National Register of Historic Places listings in Buffalo County, Wisconsin. It is intended to provide a comprehensive listing of entries in the National Register of Historic Places that are located in Buffalo County, Wisconsin. The locations of National Register properties for which the latitude and longitude coordinates are included below may be seen in a map.

There are 13 properties and districts listed on the National Register in the county.

This National Park Service list is complete through NPS recent listings posted March 21, 2025.

== Current listings ==
| | Name on the Register | Image | Date listed | Location | City or town | Description |
|---|---|---|---|---|---|---|
| 1 | Alma Historic District | Alma Historic District | May 13, 1982 (#82000631) | Roughly bounded by RR tracks, 2nd, Swift, and Cedar Sts. 44°19′16″N 91°54′52″W | Alma | Large historic district of over 100 contributing properties squeezed between the river and the bluffs, many built during the booming Beef Slough logging days from 1867 to 1889. |
| 2 | Jacob Berni House | Jacob Berni House | May 13, 1982 (#82000632) | 911 Riverview Dr. 44°19′51″N 91°55′14″W | Alma | Brick gabled-ell house built in 1885. Jacob was a foreman of logging and rafting crews, a farmer, president of a cheese factory, and school board treasurer. |
| 3 | Burlington Hotel | Burlington Hotel | May 13, 1982 (#82000633) | 809 N. Main St. 44°19′45″N 91°55′11″W | Alma | Two-story brick hotel with zinc cornice built in 1890. Named for the Chicago, Burlington and Northern Railroad, whose depot was across the street. |
| 4 | Fugina House | Fugina House | May 8, 1979 (#79000061) | 348 S. Main St. 44°07′44″N 91°42′53″W | Fountain City | Prairie School house designed by Percy Dwight Bentley and built in 1916. Martin Fugina was a son of Fountain City who became a lawyer, DA, and county judge. He and his wife were both active in civic affairs. |
| 5 | Frederick Laue House | Frederick Laue House | May 14, 1979 (#79000062) | 1111 S. Main St. 44°19′02″N 91°54′47″W | Alma | Grand Italianate house on a corner lot built in 1866. Laue ran Alma's largest lumber mill and was a founder of the Beef Slough Log Driving Company. |
| 6 | Frederick Laue, Jr., House | Frederick Laue, Jr., House | May 13, 1982 (#82000634) | 1109 S. Main St. 44°18′46″N 91°54′38″W | Alma | Second Empire-styled house built in 1896. |
| 7 | Harmonia Hall | Harmonia Hall | June 18, 2009 (#09000453) | S2119 Co. Hwy E. 44°17′08″N 91°43′24″W | Waumandee | White clapboard meeting house built in 1890 of the Harmonie Gesellschaft, German and Swiss Freethinkers who met monthly to discuss and sing. The group had organized around 1861 and survived into the 1950s. |
| 8 | John L. Senn House | John L. Senn House | May 13, 1982 (#82000635) | 811 S. 2nd St. 44°18′56″N 91°54′40″W | Alma | Brick home with pierced barge boards, built in 1885. |
| 9 | Sherman House | Sherman House | August 14, 1979 (#79000063) | 301 S. Main St. 44°19′18″N 91°54′54″W | Alma | Brick hotel built in 1866 and named for General William T. Sherman. Served farmers, lumbermen and rivermen. |
| 10 | John Steiner Store | John Steiner Store | May 13, 1982 (#82000636) | 1101 S. Main St. 44°18′49″N 91°54′40″W | Alma | Two-story brick store with cornice built in 1887. |
| 11 | Dr. J. T. Tenny House | Dr. J. T. Tenny House | May 13, 1982 (#82000637) | 305 N. 2nd St. 44°19′31″N 91°54′57″W | Alma | Queen Anne-styled house with shingled ends and ornate touches built in 1904 for the doctor's new wife, who died the next year. Built by Ulrich Walser. |
| 12 | Tester and Polin General Merchandise Store | Tester and Polin General Merchandise Store | May 14, 1979 (#79000064) | 215 N. Main St. 44°19′32″N 91°55′03″W | Alma | 2.5 story brick store built in 1861 in which farmers traded locally-grown grain and produce for general merchandise. |
| 13 | Ulrich Walser House | Ulrich Walser House | May 13, 1982 (#82000638) | 711 N. 2nd St. 44°19′44″N 91°55′06″W | Alma | 1895 Queen Anne-styled house with bargeboards and Eastlake front porch, which Walser, an immigrant builder from Graubuenden, Switzerland, built for himself. |

== See also ==
- List of National Historic Landmarks in Wisconsin
- National Register of Historic Places listings in Wisconsin
- Listings in neighboring counties: Eau Claire, Pepin, Trempealeau, Wabasha (MN), Winona (MN)
