= Burlington Hotel =

Burlington Hotel may refer to:

in England

- The original Burlington Hotel, London, where Florence Nightingale stayed for many decades, which was purchased by owner of Morley's Hotel
- Burlington Hotel, Sheringham in Sheringham, Norfolk.
- Claremont Hotel (Eastbourne) (includes the former Burlington hotel)

in Ireland

- Burlington Hotel (Dublin)

in the United States (by state)

- Burlington Hotel (Denver, Colorado), listed on the NRHP in Colorado
- Burlington Hotel (Alma, Wisconsin), listed on the NRHP in Wisconsin
