= John Steiner (disambiguation) =

John Steiner (1941–2022) was an English actor.

John Steiner may also refer to:

- John A. Steiner (1816–1902), American politician and military officer from Maryland
- John Michael Steiner (1925–2014), Czech-American sociologist
- John Steiner (psychoanalyst) (born 1934), British psychoanalyst

== See also ==
- Vera John-Steiner (1930–2017), Hungarian-American educational psychologist
- John Steiner Store, a store in Wisconsin
- John Stainer (1840–1901), English composer and organist
- John Stein (disambiguation)
