= John P. Madgett Generating Station =

Electrical power station in Alma, Buffalo County, Wisconsin

John P. Madgett Station
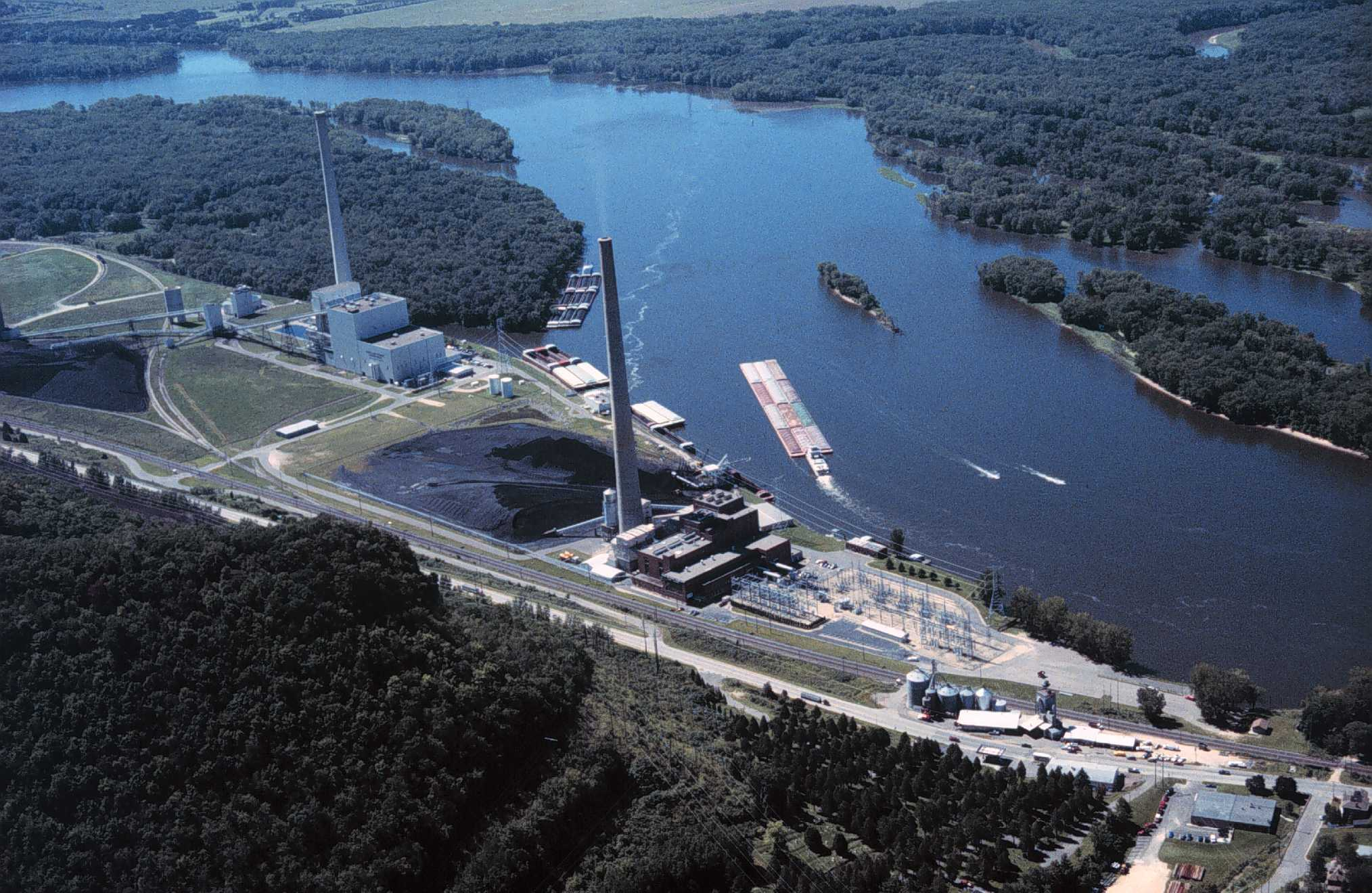
- John P. Madgett Station (far left)
- Country: United States
- Location: Alma, Wisconsin
- Coordinates: 44°18′11″N 91°54′45″W
- Status: Operational
- Commission date: November 1979
- Owner: Dairyland Power Cooperative

Thermal power station
- Primary fuel: Western Coal from Utah or Wyoming
- Cooling source: Mississippi River

Power generation
- Nameplate capacity: 369 MW

External links
- Website: John P. Madgett Station

John P. Madgett Station is a base load, coal fired, electrical power station located in Alma, Wisconsin in Buffalo County. Owned by Dairyland Power Cooperative, the John P. Madgett Station and Alma Station are part of its "Alma site".

The power station is estimated to cause six deaths per year due to soot and smog pollution, primarily in Buffalo, Trempealeau, Pepin and Eau Claire counties. There are no announced plans for retirement as of 2026, however, Dairyland Power Cooperative's 2025 Annual Report shows no coal in the power mix by 2036.

== See also ==
- List of power stations in Wisconsin
