= Senhouse =

Senhouse is a surname, and may refer to:

- Humphrey Senhouse (politician) (1731–1814), British Tory politician
- Humphrey Fleming Senhouse (1781–1841), British Royal Navy officer
- Richard Senhouse (died 1626), English Bishop of Carlisle
- Roger Senhouse (1899–1970), English publisher and translator
- William Senhouse (died 1505), English Bishop of Durham

== See also ==
- John L. Senn House
