= Edwin F. Ganz =

American politician

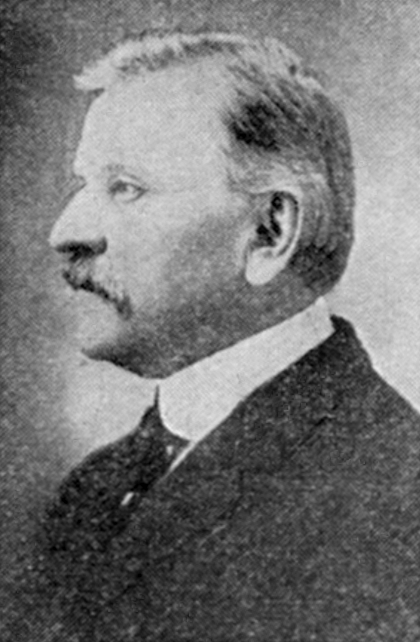

Member of the Wisconsin State Assembly
- In office 1919

Personal details
- Born: June 13, 1859 Waumandee, Wisconsin, US
- Died: January 20, 1946 (aged 86) Wabasha, Minnesota, US
- Party: Republican
- Education: University of Wisconsin–Platteville
- Occupation: Farmer, teacher, newspaper editor, politician

Edwin F. Ganz (June 13, 1859 – January 20, 1946) was an American farmer, teacher, newspaper editor, and politician.

== Biography ==
Born in the Town of Waumandee, Buffalo County, Wisconsin, Ganz was educated in the public schools and at Platteville Normal School (now University of Wisconsin–Platteville). He taught school for fourteen years and then purchased the Buffalo County Journal in 1890. He was postmaster of Alma, Wisconsin and served on the Buffalo County Board of Supervisors. Ganz also served on the Alma Common Council and the school board. Ganz was elected to the Wisconsin State Assembly in 1918 and was involved with the Republican Party In Buffalo County. Ganz retired to a farm where he raised cattle. He died in a hospital in Wabasha, Minnesota, aged 86.
