= Anchorage, Wisconsin =

- Ghost town
- Location within Wisconsin
- Coordinates: 44°16′07″N 91°45′26″W
- Country: United States
- State: Wisconsin
- County: Buffalo
- Town: Waumandee
- Elevation: 778 ft (237 m)
- GNIS feature ID: 1837495

Anchorage is a ghost town in Buffalo County, Wisconsin, United States. Anchorage was located in the town of Waumandee, 3.5 miles (5.6 km) southwest of the community of Waumandee.

About all that remains of this town is a small cemetery on Wisconsin Highway 88.
