= Ruth Grulkowski =

American gymnast

Ruth Hatyina
- Born: Ruth Catherine Grulkowski; December 9, 1930; Waumandee, Wisconsin, United States
- Died: June 24, 2012 (aged 81); Chicago, Illinois, United States
- Education: University of Chicago
- Spouse: Robert Hatyina (1956–2006)

Ruth Catherine Grulkowski (December 9, 1930 – June 24, 2012) was a competitor in the gymnastics competition at the 1952 Summer Olympics in Helsinki.

== Biography ==
Grulkowski was born on December 9, 1930, in Waumandee, Wisconsin. She moved to Chicago, Illinois, attended the University of Chicago. and married Robert Hatyina. She had three daughters (Cindy, Lisa, & Linda), and three grandchildren (Melissa, Bobby, & Carrie). Ruth died on June 24, 2012, due to medical complications.

== Gymnastics ==
Grulkowski was part of the 1952 Women's Gymnastics Team. She later won the Amateur Athletic Union Women's National Championship Title in 1953 and 1954. She was a member of the Lincoln Turners, the Chicago Acro Theater, and the Adagio Gymnastics Group.

== Olympic results ==
Event	Place
Women's Team All-Around	15
Women's Team Portable Apparatus	16
Women's Balance Beam	48
Women's Floor Exercise	59
Women's Individual All-Around	65
Women's Uneven Bars	74
Women's Horse Vault	97
