= Ulrich and Anton Walser =

Swiss-born American builders

Ulrich Walser and Anton Walser were Swiss-born American builders. They were two of six Walser brothers who immigrated to the United States from Haldenstein, Gaubuenden, Switzerland.

One or both of them built most of the frame houses in Alma, Wisconsin that have Queen Anne style elements.

A number of their works are listed on the U.S. National Register of Historic Places.

In a double ceremony, Anton and Ulrich were married in 1889, in a church that they had just built.

Works include (with attribution):

- Frederick Laue, Jr., House, 1109 S. Main St., Alma, Wisconsin (Walser, Ulrich & Anton), NRHP-listed
- Burlington Hotel, 809 N. Main St., Alma, Wisconsin (Walser, Ulrich & Anton), NRHP-listed
- Dr. J. T. Tenny House, 305 N. 2nd St., Alma, Wisconsin (Walser, Ulrich & Anton), NRHP-listed
- Ulrich Walser House, 711 N. 2nd St., Alma, Wisconsin (Walser, Ulrich), NRHP-listed
- P. E. Ibach House, (built 1897) 108 South Second Street, Alma, Wisconsin. "Premier" example of Queen Anne architecture in Alma
- Dr. George Seller House, 205 North Second Street, additions including pillared porch added in 1891 by Ulrich Walser
- Buffalo County Training School, 505 South Second Street, was built 1902 by Anton Walser and crew. A "massive solid red brick building".

== See also ==
- Frank Walser, a builder in Raleigh, North Carolina
