= Alphonse Roy Lejk =

American politician (1911–1995)

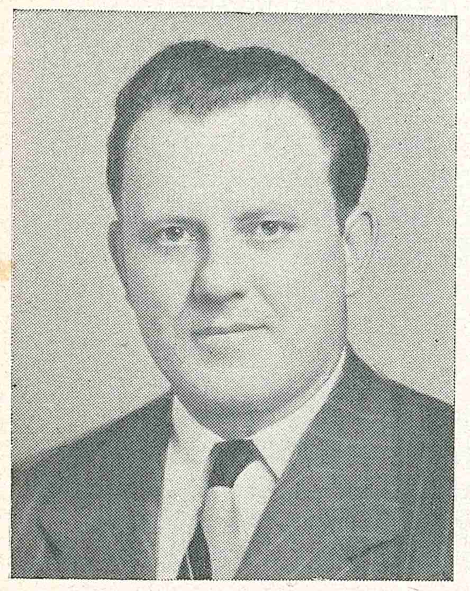

Member of the Minnesota House of Representatives from the 2nd district
- In office January 4, 1949 – January 5, 1953

Personal details
- Born: February 12, 1911 Waumandee, Wisconsin, U.S.
- Died: July 28, 1995 (aged 84)
- Resting place: Saint Mary's Cemetery, Winona, Minnesota, U.S.
- Children: 3
- Occupation: Politician

Alphonse Roy "Al" Lejk (February 12, 1911 – July 28, 1995) was an American politician who served in the Minnesota House of Representatives from 1949 to 1953, representing the 2nd legislative district of Minnesota in the 56th and 57th Minnesota Legislatures.

== Early life ==
Lejk was born in Waumandee, Wisconsin, on February 12, 1911.

== Career ==
Lejk served in the Minnesota House of Representatives from 1949 to 1953, representing the 2nd legislative district of Minnesota in the 56th and 57th Minnesota Legislatures.

During his time in office, Lejk served on the following committees:

- Education (1949–1953)
- General Legislation (1949–1950)
- Employees Compensation (1951–1952)
- Highways (1949–1953)
- Labor (1949–1953)
- Reapportionment (1949–1950)
- Public Domain (1951–1952)

Lejk's time in office began on January 4, 1949, and concluded on January 5, 1953. His district included representation for Winona County.

Lejk was affiliated with the liberal caucus.

Prior to serving in the Minnesota Legislature, Lejk was an assistant flour bender and grain miller.

== Personal life and death ==
Lejk was married and had three children. He resided in Winona, Minnesota.

Lejk died at the age of 84 on July 28, 1995. He was interred in Saint Mary's Cemetery, located in Winona.

Minnesota House of Representatives
Preceded by —	Member of the Minnesota House of Representatives from the 2nd district 1949–1953	Succeeded by —
