= Tester and Polin General Merchandise Store =

- U.S. National Register of Historic Places
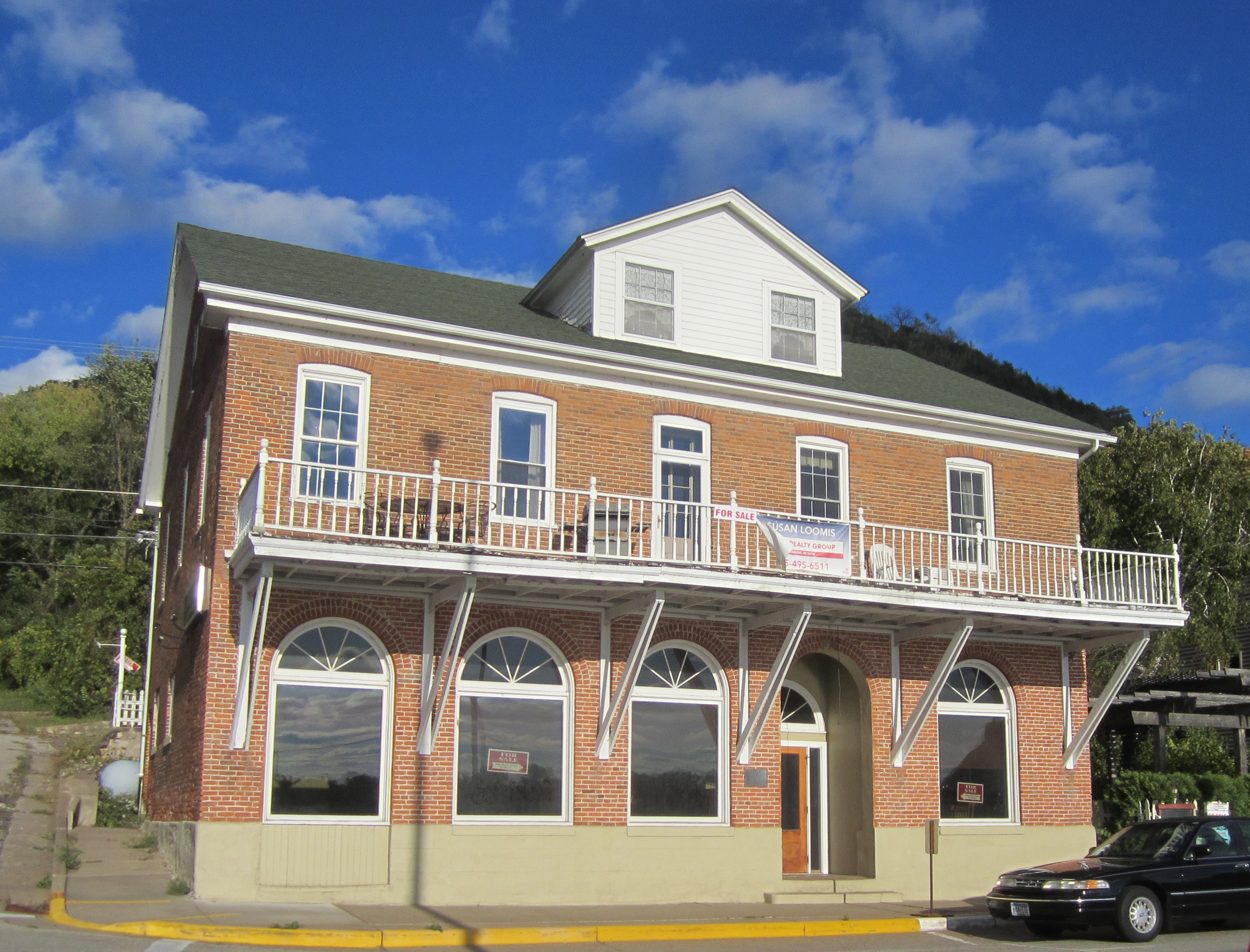
- Tester and Polin General Merchandise Store
- Location: 215 N. Main St., Alma, Wisconsin
- Coordinates: 44°19′32″N 91°55′03″W
- Area: 0.2 acres (0.081 ha)
- Built: 1861
- Architect: Gottlieb Iberg
- Architectural style: Vernacular
- NRHP reference No.: 79000064
- Added to NRHP: May 14, 1979

The Tester and Polin General Merchandise Store is located in Alma, Wisconsin.

== History ==
Farmer traded locally-grown grain and produce for general merchandise at the store. It was listed on the National Register of Historic Places in 1979 and on the State Register of Historic Places in 1989.
