= Lock and Dam No. 4 =

Dam in Minnesota and Wisconsin, U.S.

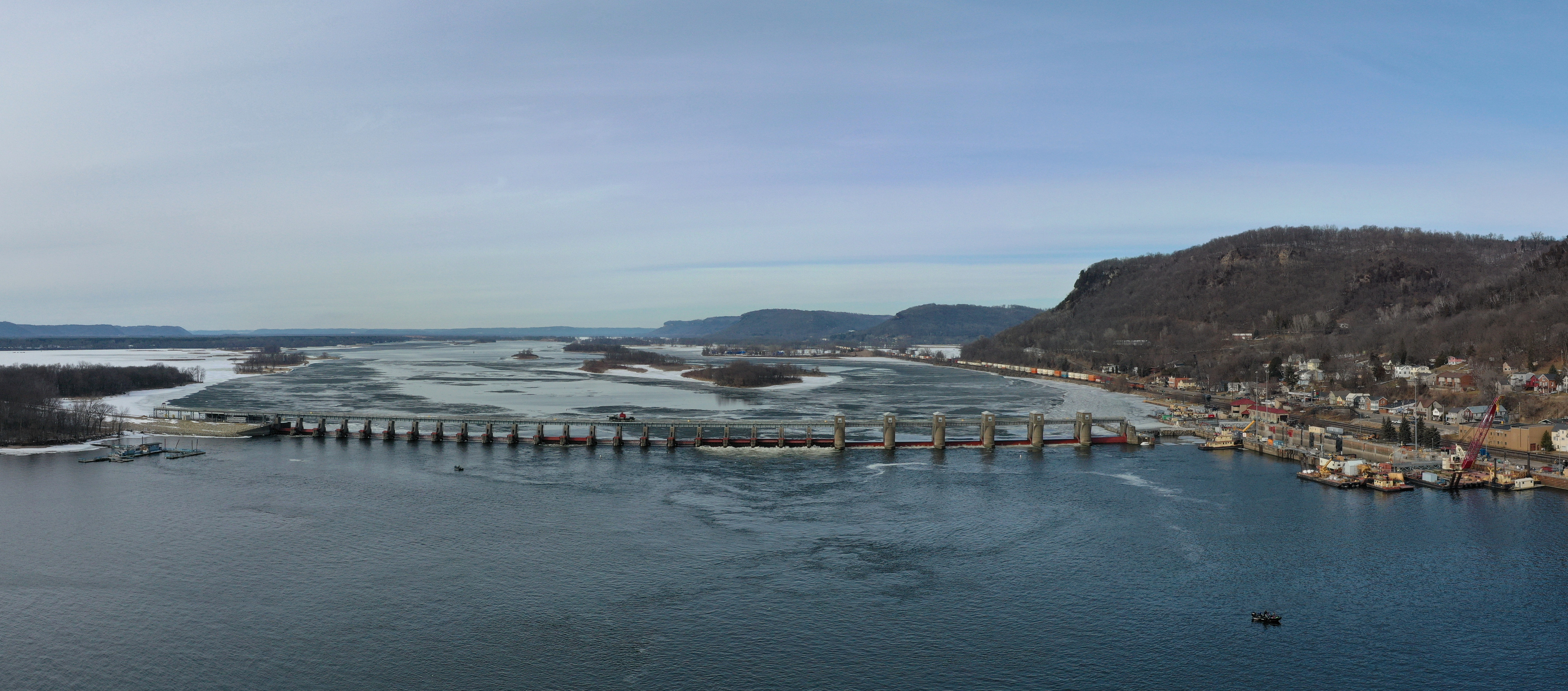
- Mississippi River Lock and Dam No. 4

- Location within Wisconsin
- Location: Alma, Buffalo County, Wisconsin / Greenfield Township, Wabasha County, Minnesota, United States.
- Coordinates: 44°19′32″N 91°55′13″W
- Construction began: 1932; 94 years ago
- Opening date: May 1935; 91 years ago
- Operators: U.S. Army Corps of Engineers, St. Paul District

Dam and spillways
- Impounds: Upper Mississippi River
- Length: 1,367 feet (416.7 m) (movable portion)

Reservoir
- Creates: Pool 4
- Total capacity: 878,000 acre⋅ft (1.083 km^{3})
- Catchment area: 57,100 mi^{2} (148,000 km^{2})

Lock and Dam No. 4 is a lock and dam located near Alma, Wisconsin and Kellogg, Minnesota on the Upper Mississippi River around river mile 752.8. The lock and dam are owned and operated by the St. Paul District of the United States Army Corps of Engineers-Mississippi Valley Division.

== History ==
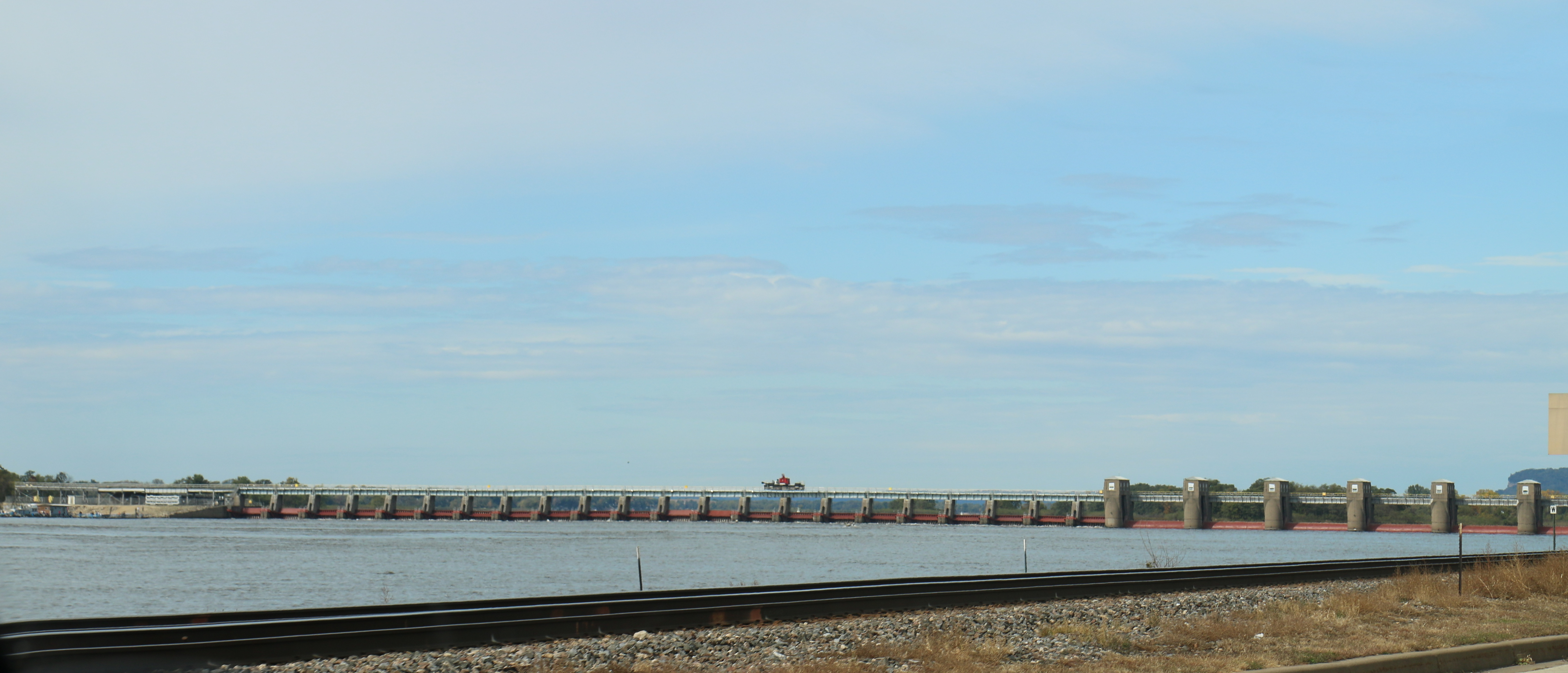
Dam photographed from Wisconsin Highway 35

The lock and dam was constructed and placed in operation in May 1935. There were ten major injuries and three deaths recorded during construction of the facility. Its last major rehabilitation was from 1988 to 1994.

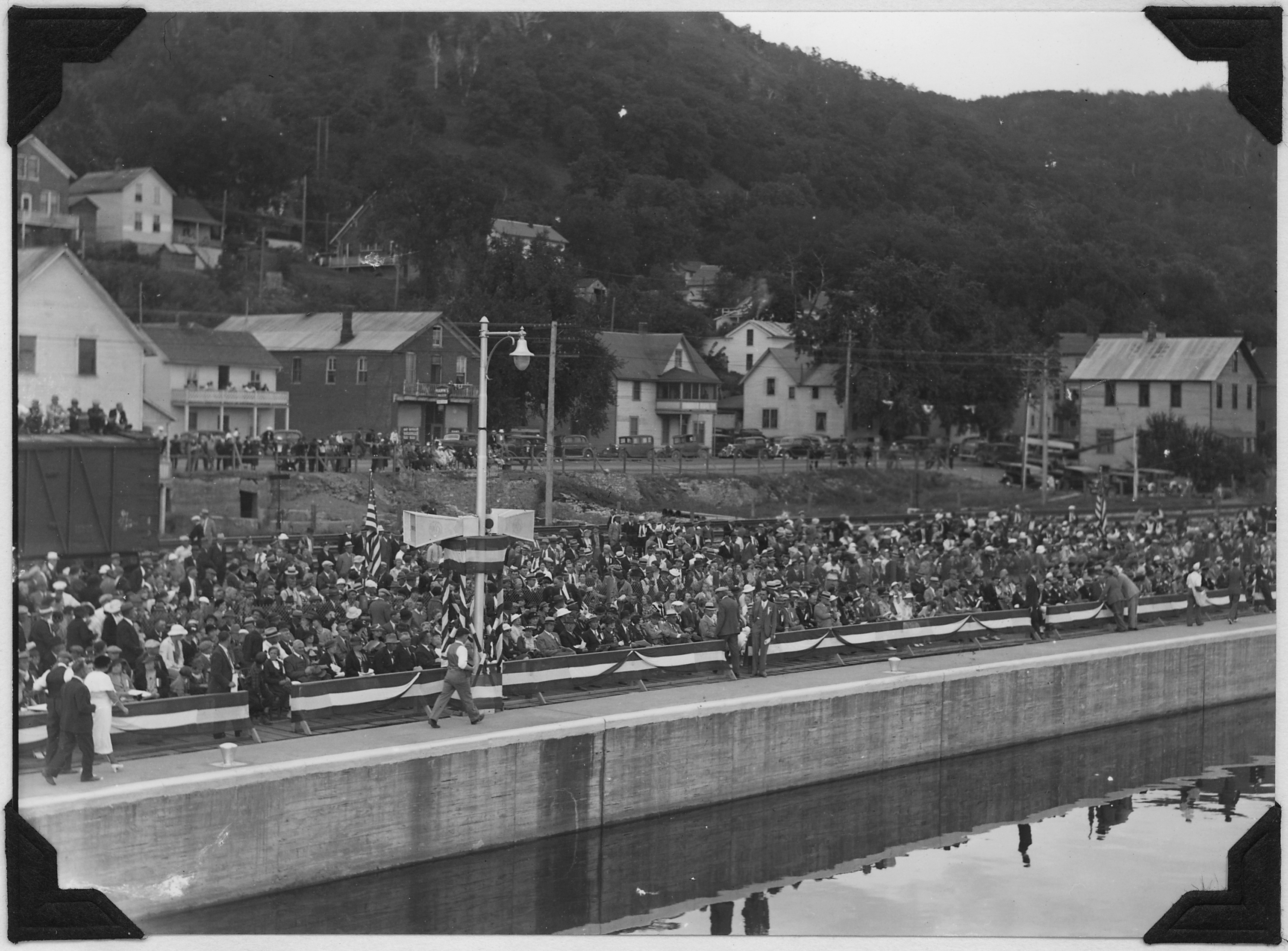
An old photograph dated September 1935 and captioned "Photograph of crowd onshore assembled for Alma, WI dam dedication."

== See also ==
- Lake Pepin, located above Lock and Dam No. 4
- Upper Mississippi River National Wildlife and Fish Refuge
