= Castlerock Museum =

Museum in Alma, Wisconsin, US

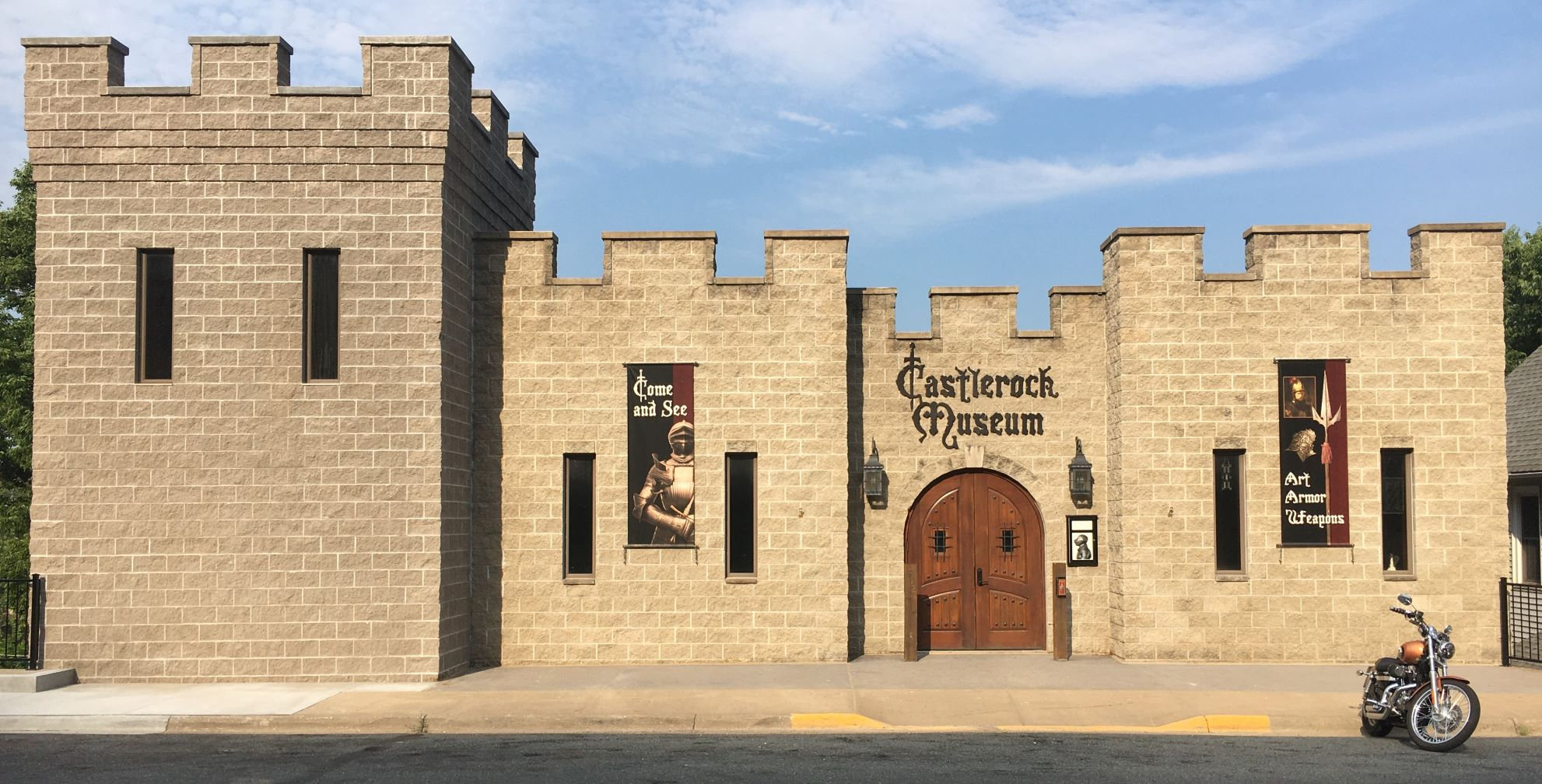
- Castlerock Museum from the front.
- Established: July 8, 2011
- Location: 402 S Second St; Alma, Wisconsin
- Coordinates: 44°19′11″N 91°54′50″W
- Type: Arms and Armor Museum
- Website: Castlerock Museum

Castlerock Museum is a non-profit history museum in Alma, Wisconsin nestled along the bluffs of the Mississippi River. The museum features an extensive collection of ancient and medieval European arms and armor that is one of the largest in the Midwest. The museum recently added two new galleries that cover American history as well.

== History ==
The museum was founded by Gary B. Schlosstein, a local Wisconsin judge. When he was ten years old, Schlosstein bought a civil war musket from a secondhand store in Winona, Minnesota for three dollars. This ignited a lifelong passion for collecting historical memorabilia. In the early 1980s, he started collecting medieval arms and armor.

As the collection grew, Schlosstein decided to build Castlerock Museum as a permanent home for the collection where the artifacts could be preserved and put on display for the general public. The museum had its grand opening on July 8, 2011.

== Collection ==
The museum's collection is focused on ancient and medieval European arms and armor. Highlights include a full suit of Maximillian armor, a sword dating to the time of the first Crusade with the names of Jesus and Mary on the blade, and a parade helmet that probably belonged to a member of the ruling family of one of the Italian city states like Venice, Florence, or Milan.

The museum has recently expanded its collection to include a number of American history related artifacts including over a hundred period firearms that will be going on display in its new galleries.
