= Ulrich Walser House =

Historic house in Wisconsin, United States

- U.S. National Register of Historic Places
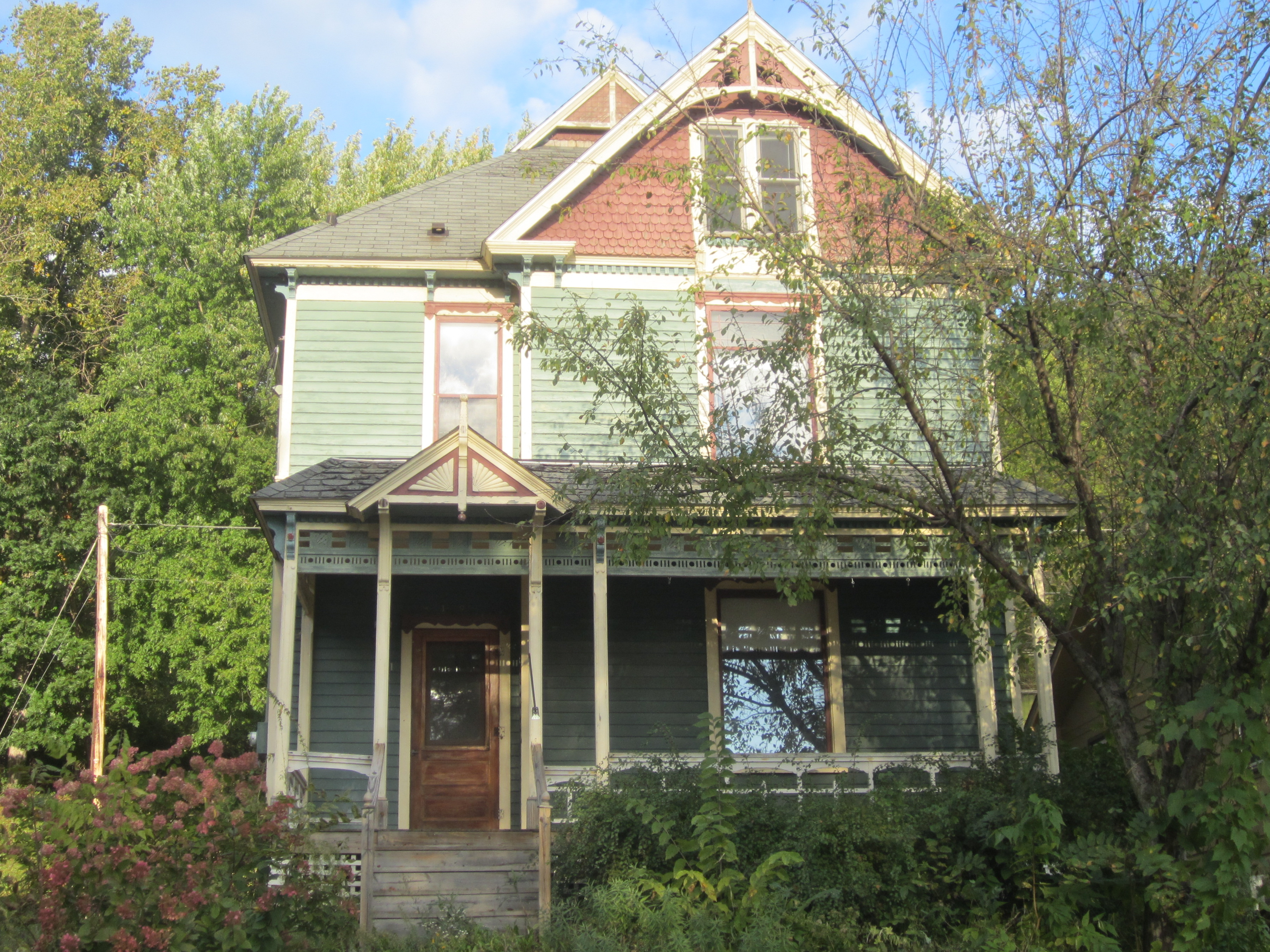
- Ulrich Walser House
- Location: 711 N. 2nd St. Alma, Wisconsin
- Coordinates: 44°19′34″N 91°55′02″W
- Built: 1895
- Built by: Ulrich Walser
- Architectural style: Queen Anne/Stick Style
- MPS: Alma MRA
- NRHP reference No.: 82000638
- Added to NRHP: May 13, 1982

The Ulrich Walser House is a house located at 711 North 2nd Street in Alma, Wisconsin, United States. It was constructed in 1895 by Ulrich Walser and was placed on the National Register of Historic Places in 1982.

Ulrich Walser, a prominent builder, lived in this house until his death in 1950. It was constructed in Queen Anne style. The building is currently a private residence.
