= Dr. J. T. Tenny House =

Historic house in Wisconsin, United States

- U.S. National Register of Historic Places
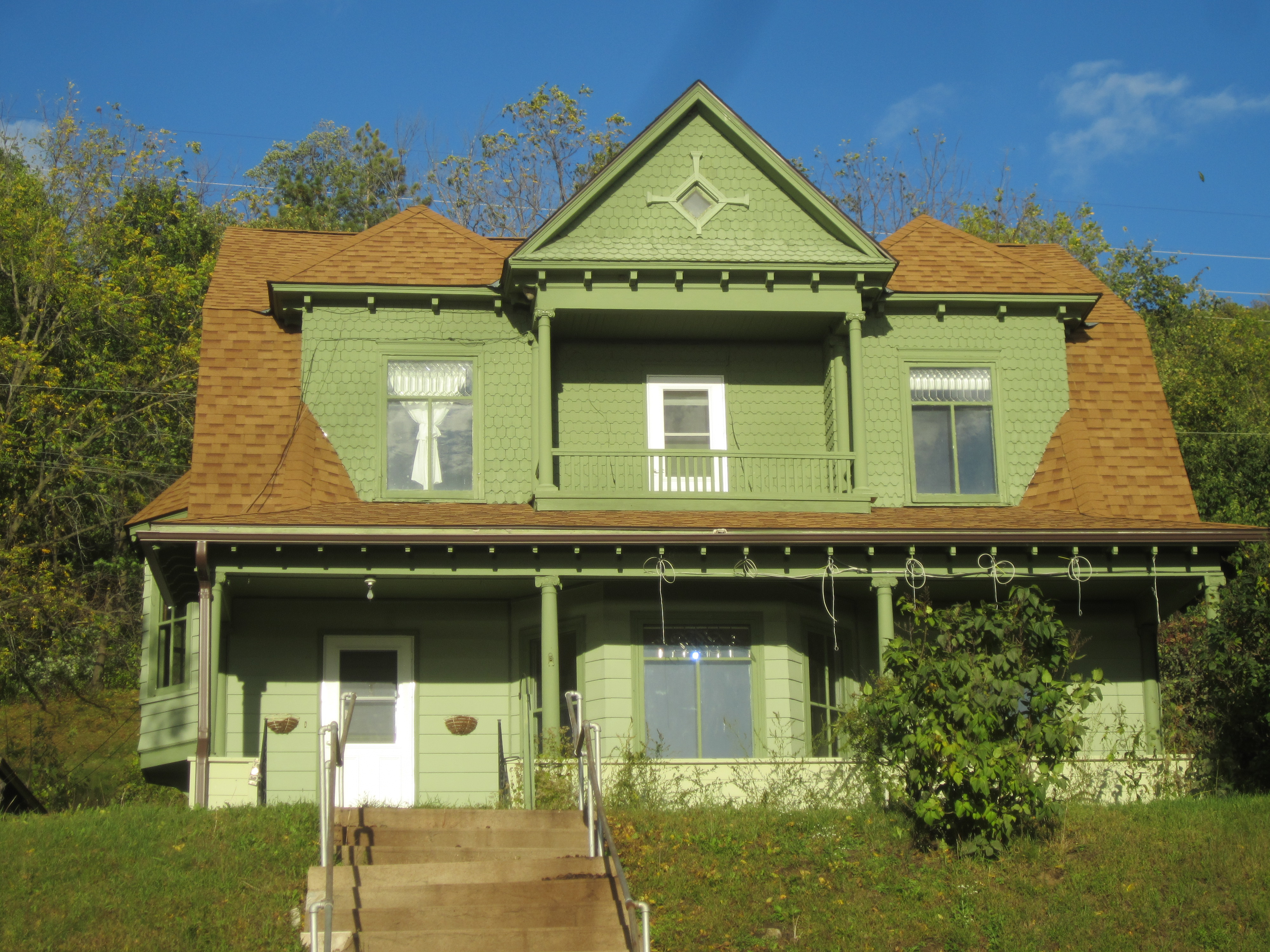

- Location within Wisconsin Location within the United States
- Location: 305 N. 2nd St., Alma, Wisconsin
- Coordinates: 44°19′31″N 91°54′57″W
- Area: 0.2 acres (0.081 ha)
- Built: 1904
- Built by: Walser, Ulrich & Anton
- Architectural style: Queen Anne
- MPS: Alma MRA
- NRHP reference No.: 82000637
- Added to NRHP: May 13, 1982

The Dr. J. T. Tenny House in Alma, Wisconsin, United States, is a Queen Anne style house built in 1904 by local builders Ulrich and Anton Walser. It was listed on the National Register of Historic Places in 1982.

Ulrich Walser and/or his brother Anton built most of the frame houses in Alma that have Queen Anne style elements.
