= Peter Polin =

19th century American politician

Personal details
- Born: March 25, 1832 Zillis, Switzerland
- Died: November 7, 1870 (aged 38) Alma, Wisconsin, U.S.
- Cause of death: Stroke
- Resting place: Alma Cemetery, Alma, Wisconsin
- Party: Republican
- Spouse: Magdalena Liesch
- Children: Joshua; Anna Marie (Miley); (b. 1863; died 1958)
- Known for: Posthumously elected to the Wisconsin Assembly

Military service
- Allegiance: United States
- Branch/service: United States Volunteers; Union Army
- Years of service: 1861
- Rank: 1st Lieutenant, USV
- Unit: 6th Reg. Wis. Vol. Infantry
- Battles/wars: American Civil War

Peter Polin (March 25, 1832 – November 7, 1870) was a Swiss American immigrant, merchant, and Republican politician. He died the day before his election to the Wisconsin State Assembly.

== Biography ==
Born in Zillis, Switzerland, Polin emigrated to the United States and settled in Dubuque, Iowa, and then moved to Alma, Buffalo County, Wisconsin, in 1857. Polin was a merchant. He served as postmaster of Alma, Wisconsin, and as Buffalo County Treasurer from 1862 to 1864. Polin was a Republican. In the Wisconsin General Election of November 8, 1870, Polin ran for the Wisconsin State Assembly against John Burt. However, on November 7, 1870, the day before election day, Polin died suddenly. However, most voters were not aware of his death and elected Polin to the Wisconsin Assembly with 444 votes to 370 for John Burt (Democrat) and 50 votes for Augustus F. Finkelnburg (Republican). Because there was no choice for the Wisconsin Assembly seat, Wisconsin Acting Governor Thaddeus Pound ordered a special election for December 31, 1870. In the December 31, 1870, Wisconsin Assembly special election Ahaz F. Allen (Republican) won the Wisconsin Assembly seat with 529 votes to 431 votes for James Burt (Democrat) and 172 votes for James L. Hallock (Independent).
