= Frederick Laue House =

Historic house in Wisconsin, United States

- U.S. National Register of Historic Places
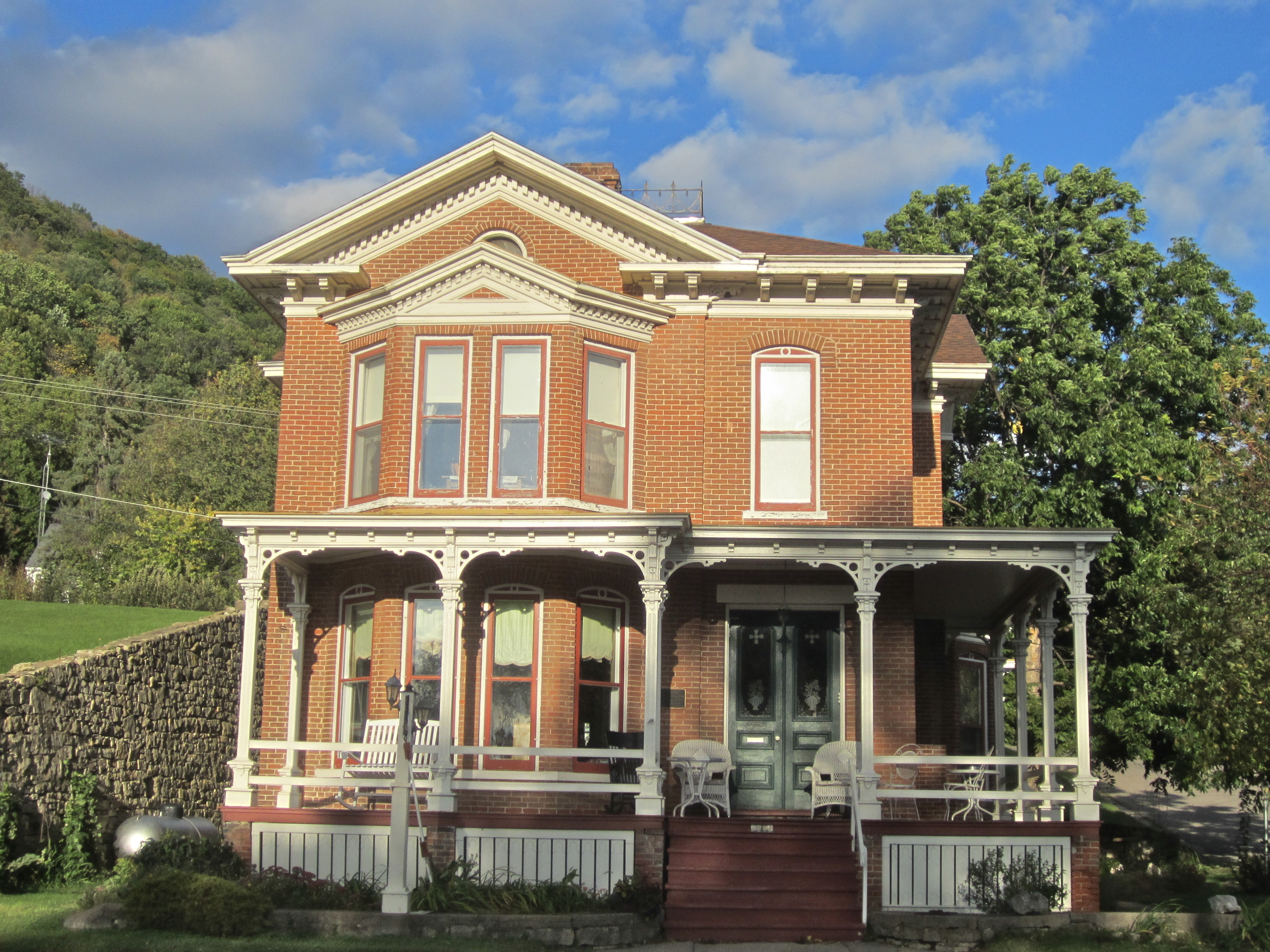
- Frederick Laue House
- Location: 1111 S. Main St., Alma, Wisconsin
- Coordinates: 44°19′02″N 91°54′47″W
- Area: 0.1 acres (0.040 ha)
- Built: 1866
- Architect: Charles G. Maybury
- Architectural style: Italianate
- NRHP reference No.: 79000062
- Added to NRHP: May 14, 1979

The Frederick Laue House is located in Alma, Wisconsin.

== History ==
Frederick Laue ran Alma's largest lumber mill and was a founder of the Beef Slough Log Driving Company. The house was listed on the National Register of Historic Places in 1979 and on the State Register of Historic Places in 1989. It served as a bed and breakfast before the owners' retirement, closing in 2016.

The home of his son, known as the Frederick Laue Jr. House, is located next door.
