= Frederick Laue Jr. House =

Historic house in Wisconsin, United States

- U.S. National Register of Historic Places
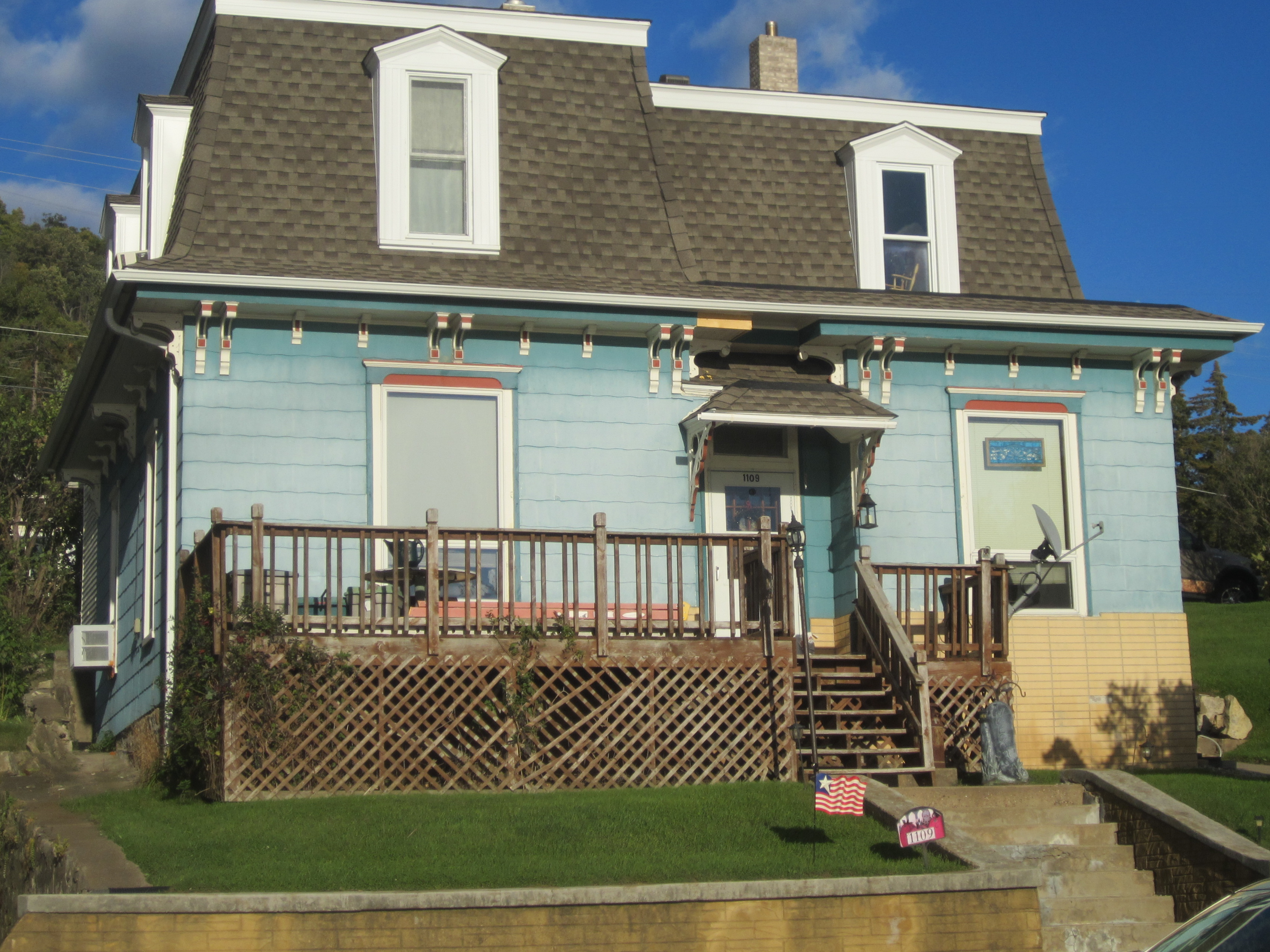

- Location within Wisconsin Location within the United States
- Location: 1109 S. Main St., Alma, Wisconsin
- Coordinates: 44°18′46″N 91°54′38″W
- Area: 0.1 acres (0.040 ha)
- Built: 1896
- Built by: Walser, Ulrich & Anton
- Architectural style: Second Empire
- MPS: Alma MRA
- NRHP reference No.: 82000634
- Added to NRHP: May 13, 1982

The Frederick Laue Jr. House (also known as the Patrick Noll Residence) is a historic house located at 1109 South Main Street in Alma, Wisconsin.

== Description and history ==
Constructed in 1896, it was originally the home of Frederick Laue Jr., son and partner of local lumber baron Frederick Laue Sr. Frederick Laue Jr. served as mayor of Alma during World War I. It is the only Second Empire style house in the city, making it especially unique. It was built by local builders Ulrich & Anton Walser. A structure that served as a summer kitchen and as servants quarters is a second contributing building on the property.

It was listed on the National Register of Historic Places on May 13, 1982.

== See also ==
- Frederick Laue House, NRHP-listed, next door at 1111 S. Main St.
