= John Stein =

John Stein may refer to:

- Jock Stein (1922–1985), Scottish football player and manager (Celtic F.C.)
- Johan Stein (1871–1951), Dutch astronomer and Jesuit priest
- John Stein (whaler) (1811-1841), Australian mariner
- John Stein (academic), Dean of Students of Georgia Tech
- John Stein (guitarist) (born 1949), American jazz guitarist
- John Stein (physiologist), professor of physiology at Oxford University
- Johnny Stein (1891/5–1962), American jazz drummer and bandleader

== See also ==
- John Steiner (disambiguation)
