= Burlington Hotel (Alma, Wisconsin) =

- U.S. National Register of Historic Places
- Location within Wisconsin Location within the United States
- Location: 809 N. Main St., Alma, Wisconsin
- Coordinates: 44°19′45″N 91°55′11″W
- Built: 1891, 1894
- Built by: Walser, Ulrich & Anton
- MPS: Alma MRA
- NRHP reference No.: 82000633
- Added to NRHP: May 13, 1982

Burlington Hotel in Alma, Wisconsin was built in 1891. It was listed on the National Register of Historic Places in 1982.

It is a frame building with a brick veneer. Its original part is 45 feet (14 m) by 43 feet (13 m); a 20 feet (6.1 m) by 36 feet (11 m) was added in 1894. Both parts were built by brothers Anton and Ulrich Walser. It had a wooden front porch with pillars and a second story verandah which was removed in the 1950s.

It was located across the street from the Burlington Depot, and much of its business was in serving employees of the railroad.
