= Alma Station (power station) =

Power station in Wisconsin, United States

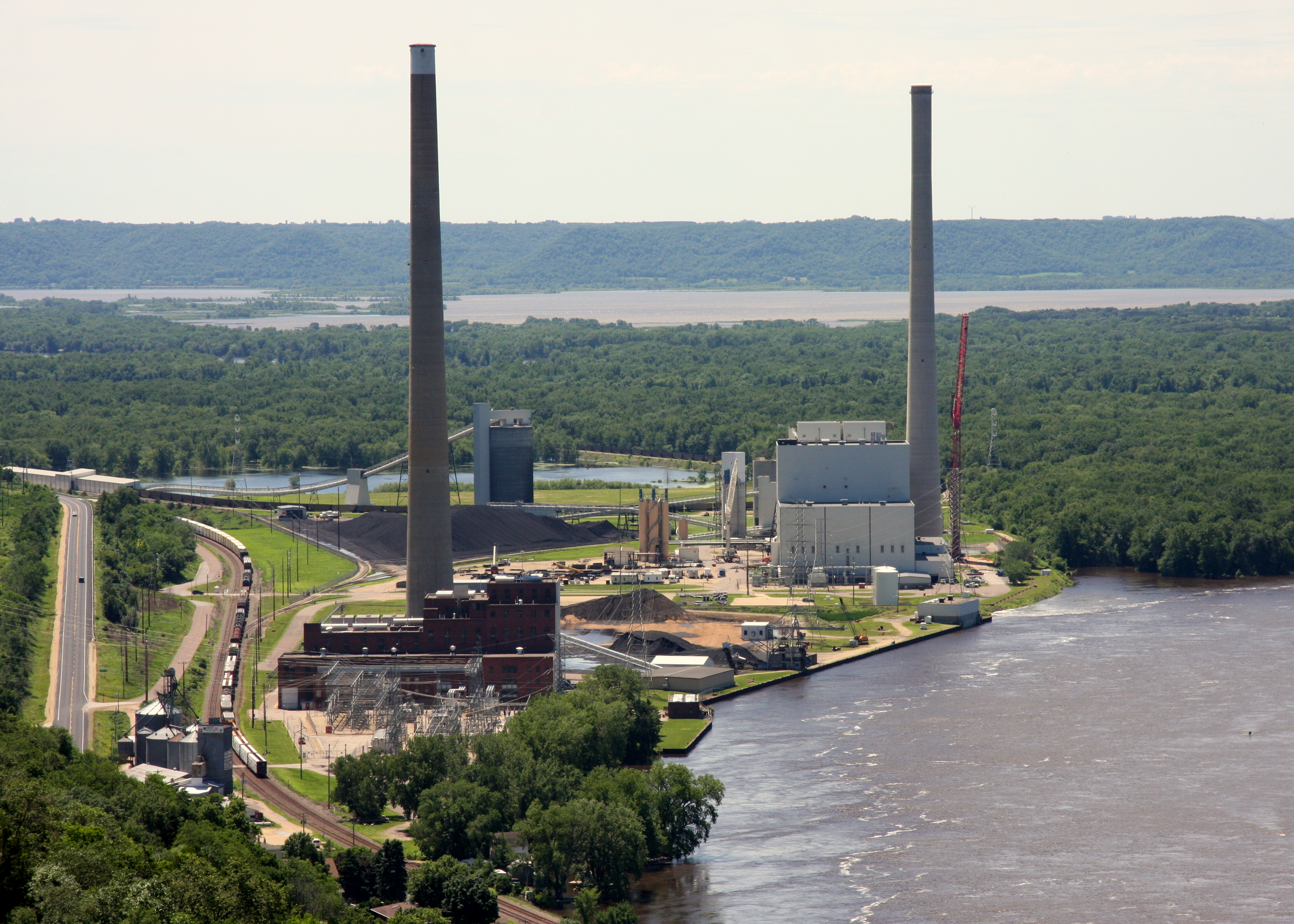
- Alma Station in 2014
- Country: United States
- Location: Alma, Wisconsin
- Coordinates: 44°18′30″N 91°54′39″W
- Status: Decommissioned
- Commission date: 1947
- Decommission date: Units 1–3: December 31, 2011; Units 4–5: Fall 2014
- Owner: Dairyland Power Cooperative

Thermal power station
- Primary fuel: Coal from Utah and Wyoming
- Turbine technology: Steam turbine
- Cooling source: Mississippi River

Power generation
- Nameplate capacity: 214 megawatts

External links
- Website: www.dairynet.com/energy_resources/alma2.php

Alma Station was a baseload coal power station in Alma, Wisconsin. The plant was built and operated by Dairyland Power Cooperative. Upon the completion of the plant's construction in 1947, it was the largest cooperatively owned power station in the world. Alma Station was decommissioned in 2014.

== History ==
Alma Station was a Dairyland Power Cooperative power station completed in 1947 in the city of Alma, Wisconsin. Construction on Alma Station began in 1946. Initially planned as a $4.5 million (equivalent to $74.3 million in 2025) project, the cost exceeded $5 million by the time of the plant's dedication in 1947. Construction of the plant was funded by the Rural Electrification Administration (REA), and a large amount of the land the plant would sit on was donated by the City of Alma. Built as a baseload power station, the initial plant design had space for six coal-fired boilers. Two 15-megawatt (MW) boiler units were installed by the time the building was completed in October 1947, though the plant was supplying power before the facility was formally dedicated. Building the station led the City of Alma to construct additional housing and a new school for the families of the incoming workers.

An additional 15-MW unit was installed in 1951, and a 54-MW unit installed in 1957. Also in 1957, the Dairyland Power Cooperative received an $18.6 million (equivalent to $213.22 million in 2025) loan from the REA to expand the station and increase the number of boilers, adding an 80-megawatt generation unit as part of the expansion. At the time, the loan was the largest ever issued by the REA. The new unit was put into service in January 1960. At its peak, the plant produced 214 MW of electricity.

In 1970, Wisconsin Attorney General Robert Warren sued the Dairyland Power Cooperative over the operation of Alma Station, saying the plant violated public nuisance laws due to air pollution from the burning coal and asked that pollution abatement equipment be installed at the plant. The Cooperative was dismissive of the claim, saying that Warren had picked their plant as a scapegoat to build interest in his re-election campaign and questioned why the only cooperatively owned power company in the state was chosen for the suit. Representatives for the Cooperative at the time said that a research study on pollution at the Alma plant was being finalized.

Decommissioning of Alma Station Units 1-3 in 2011. The plant ceased operations entirely in 2014. The plant's main building was demolished in 2017, and one of its two 700-foot tall smokestacks was demolished in 2018.

== See also ==
- List of power stations in Wisconsin
