= John L. Senn House =

Historic house in Wisconsin, United States

- U.S. National Register of Historic Places
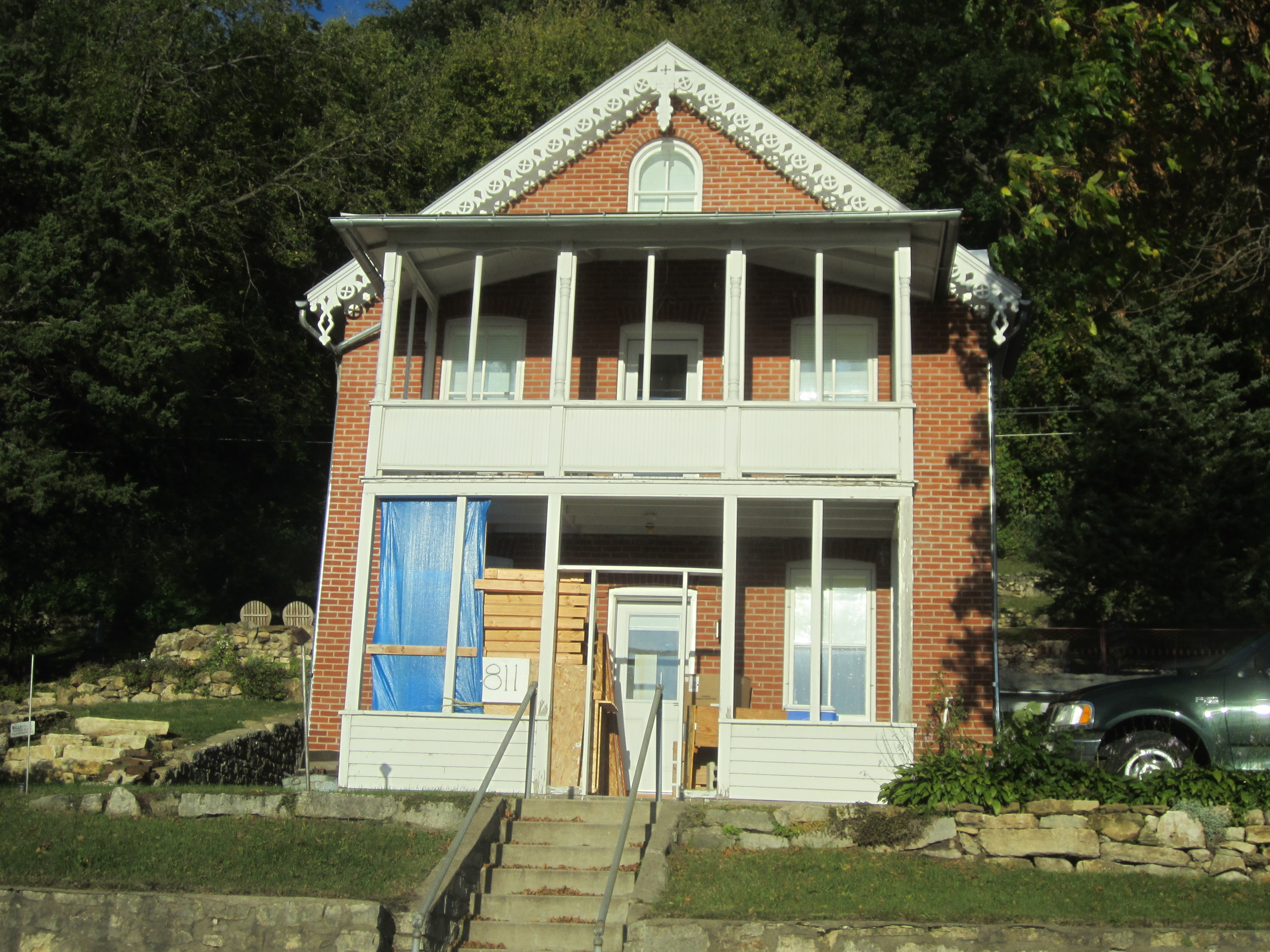
- John L. Senn House

- Location within Wisconsin Location within the United States
- Location: 811 S. 2nd St. Alma, Wisconsin
- Coordinates: 44.3155°N 91.91121°W
- Built: 1885
- NRHP reference No.: 82000635
- Added to NRHP: May 13, 1982

The John L. Senn House is located in Alma, Wisconsin, USA.

== Description ==
Among the features of the house are pierced barge boards. It was listed on the National Register of Historic Places in 1982 and on the State Register of Historic Places in 1989.
