= Waumandee (CDP), Wisconsin =

Census-designated place in Wisconsin, United States

Waumandee, Wisconsin
- Census-designated place
- Location within Wisconsin
- Coordinates: 44°18′11″N 91°42′21″W
- Country: United States
- State: Wisconsin
- County: Buffalo
- Town: Waumandee

Area
  - Total: 0.174 sq mi (0.45 km^{2})
  - Land: 0.174 sq mi (0.45 km^{2})
  - Water: 0 sq mi (0 km^{2})
- Elevation: 768 ft (234 m)

Population (2010)
  - Total: 68
  - Density: 390/sq mi (150/km^{2})
- Time zone: UTC-6 (Central (CST))
  - Summer (DST): UTC-5 (CDT)
- Area code: 608
- GNIS feature ID: 1576313

Waumandee is an unincorporated census-designated place located in the town of Waumandee, in Buffalo County, Wisconsin, United States. Waumandee is located on County Highway U, 8.5 miles (13.7 km) northeast of Cochrane. As of the 2010 census, its population is 68.
