= John Steiner Store =

- U.S. National Register of Historic Places
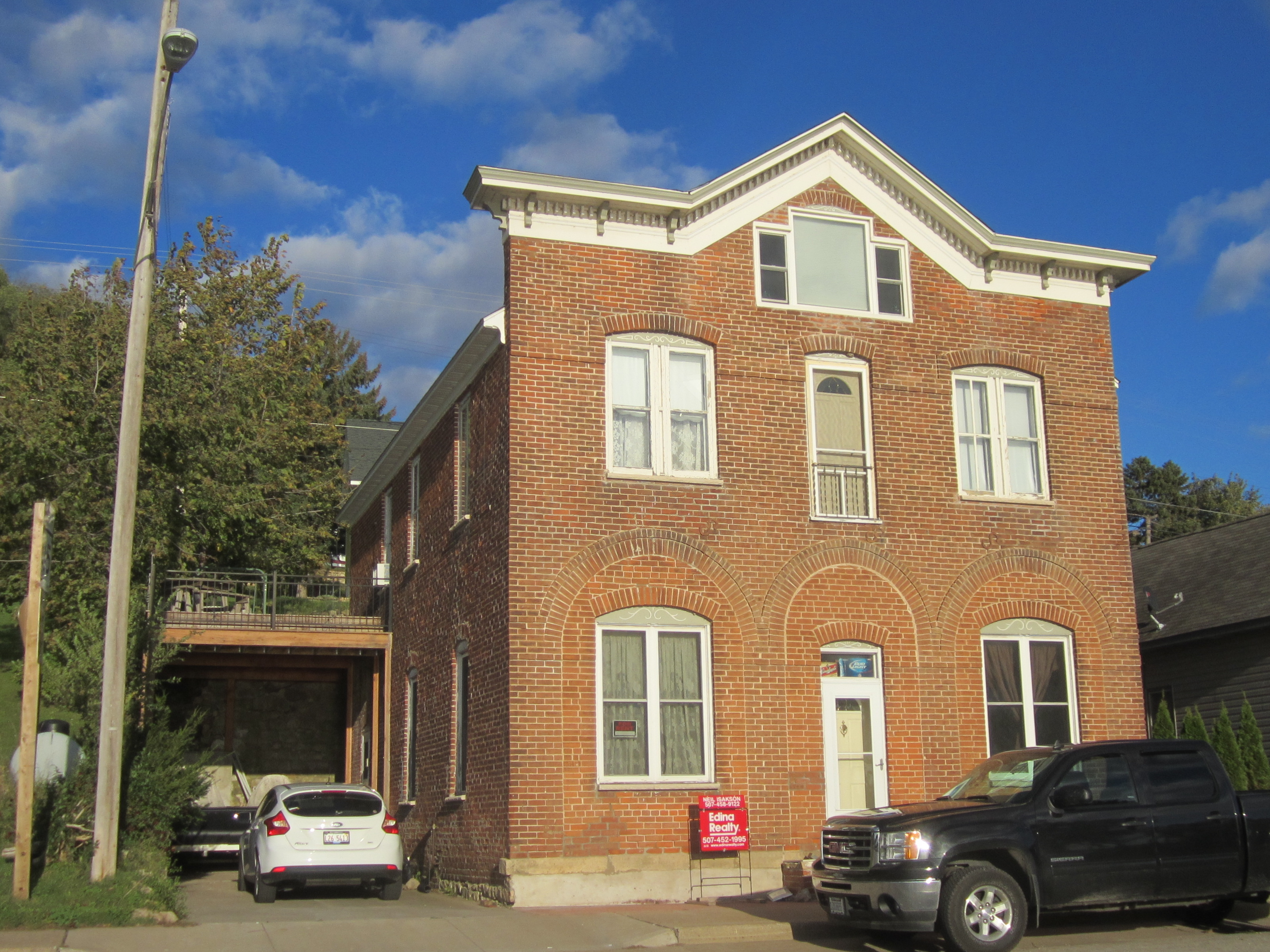
- John Steiner Store
- Location: 1101 S. Main St., Alma, Wisconsin
- Coordinates: 44°18′49″N 91°54′40″W
- Area: 0.1 acres (0.040 ha)
- Built: 1883
- MPS: Alma MRA
- NRHP reference No.: 82000636
- Added to NRHP: May 13, 1982

The John Steiner Store is located in Alma, Wisconsin, United States. It was listed on the National Register of Historic Places in 1982 and on the State Register of Historic Places in 1989.
