= Harmonia Hall =

- U.S. National Register of Historic Places
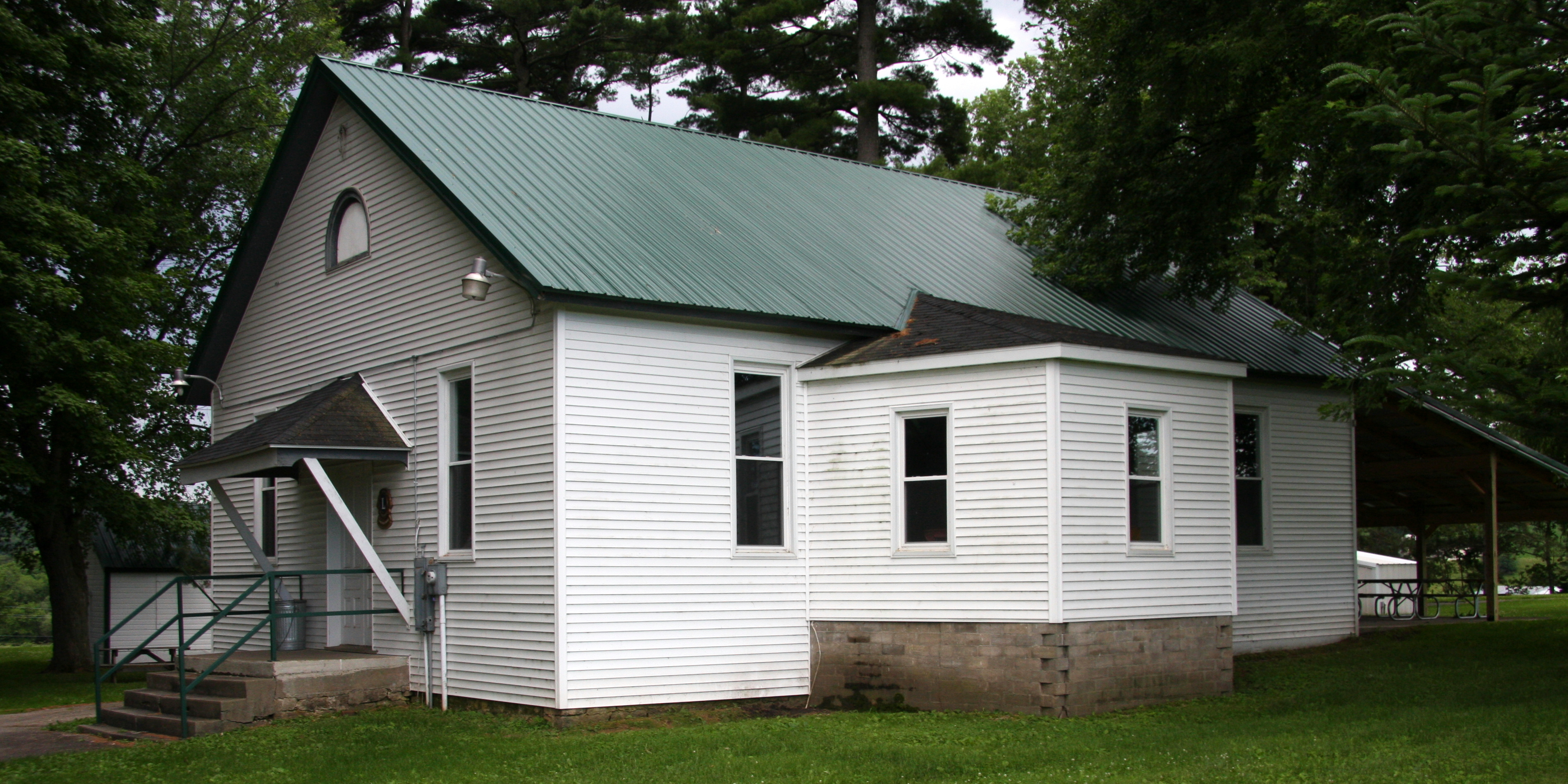

- Location within Wisconsin Location within the United States
- Location: S2119 County Highway E, Waumandee, Wisconsin
- Coordinates: 44°17′18″N 91°43′22″W
- Area: 2 acres (0.81 ha)
- Built: 1890
- Designer/builder: Joseph Schafer
- Architectural style: Mid 19th Century Revival
- NRHP reference No.: 09000453
- Added to NRHP: June 18, 2009

Harmonia Hall is a meeting hall in Waumandee, Wisconsin which was originally used by the Harmonie Gesellschaft, a group of German and Swiss Freethinkers. The Harmonie Gesellschaft, founded in Waumandee 1861, built the hall in 1890 for the group's meetings and events. Joseph Schafer, a carpenter from Arcadia, designed and built the hall in the Mid 19th Century Revival style. The Harmonie Gesellschaft had shrunk in size by the 1930s and consequently began to meet in homes rather than the hall; the group ultimately disbanded in the 1950s. The Town of Waumandee later purchased Harmonia Hall and uses it for events and meetings. The hall was added to the National Register of Historic Places on June 18, 2009.
