= Alma Historic District =

Historic district in Wisconsin, United States

- U.S. National Register of Historic Places
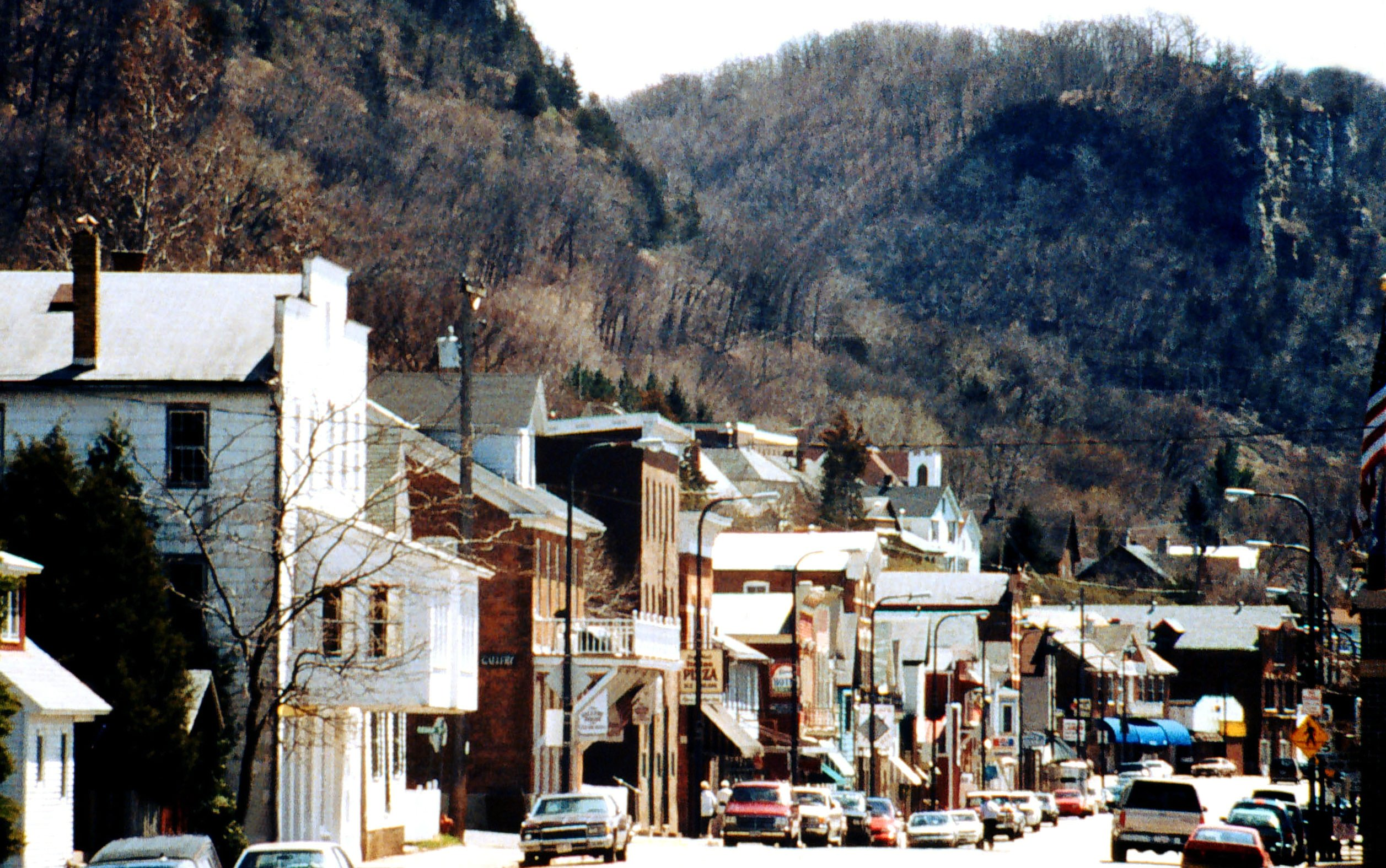
- A portion of the district.
- Location: Roughly bounded by RR tracks, 2nd, Swift, and Cedar Sts., Alma, Wisconsin
- Coordinates: 44.32125°N 91.91461°W
- Area: 34.6 acres (14.0 ha)
- MPS: Alma MRA
- NRHP reference No.: 82000631
- Added to NRHP: May 13, 1982

The Alma Historic District is located in Alma, Wisconsin.

== Description ==
The district is a large one featuring over 100 contributing properties squeezed between the river and the bluffs, many built during the booming Beef Slough logging days from 1867 to 1889.
