= Fugina House =

Historic house in Wisconsin, United States

- U.S. National Register of Historic Places
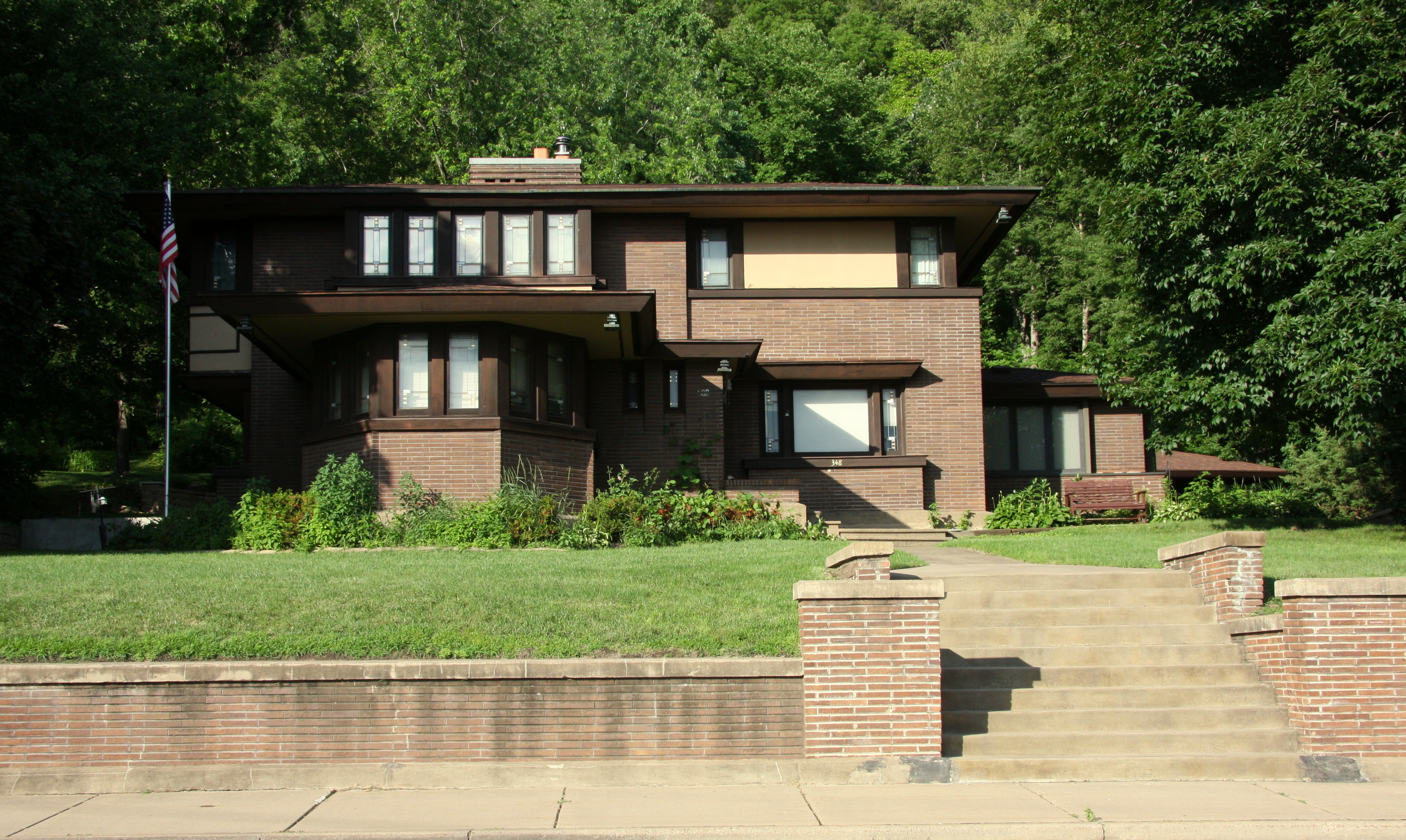

- Location within Wisconsin Location within the United States
- Location: 348 S. Main St., Fountain City, Wisconsin
- Coordinates: 44°7′44″N 91°42′53″W
- Area: 0.1 acres (0.040 ha)
- Built: 1916
- Architect: Percy Dwight Bentley
- Architectural style: Chicago, Prairie School
- NRHP reference No.: 79000061
- Added to NRHP: May 8, 1979

The Fugina House is a historic house located at 348 South Main Street in Fountain City, Wisconsin.

== History ==
The two-story house was built in 1916 for local judge Martin Fugina. It was designed in the Prairie School style by Frank Lloyd Wright student, Percy Dwight Bentley. It has remained in the Fugina family since its construction. It was added to the National Register of Historic Places on May 8, 1979.
