= Waumandee, Wisconsin =

- Town
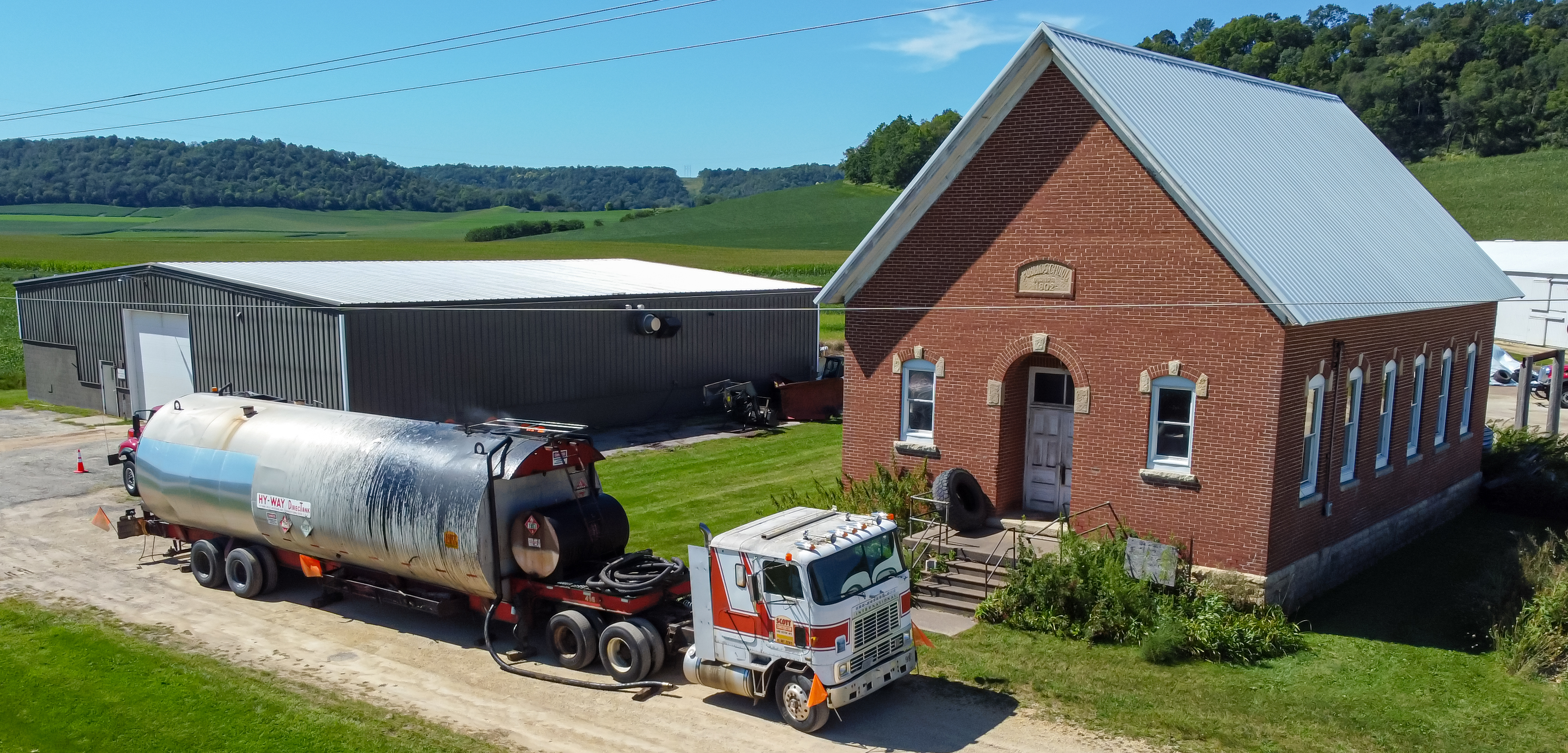
- Town hall

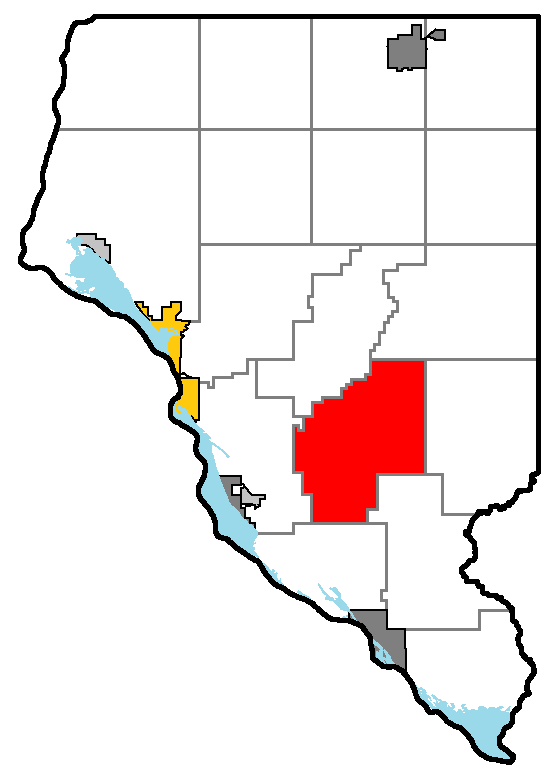
- Location of Waumandee, Buffalo County

- Location of Buffalo County, Wisconsin
- Coordinates: 44°16′56″N 91°42′51″W
- Country: United States
- State: Wisconsin
- County: Buffalo

Area
  - Total: 43.8 sq mi (113.4 km^{2})
  - Land: 43.5 sq mi (112.7 km^{2})
  - Water: 0.27 sq mi (0.7 km^{2})
- Elevation: 823 ft (251 m)

Population (2020)
  - Total: 508
  - Density: 11.7/sq mi (4.51/km^{2})
- Time zone: UTC-6 (Central (CST))
  - Summer (DST): UTC-5 (CDT)
- Area code: 608
- FIPS code: 55-84325
- GNIS feature ID: 1584373

Waumandee (/ˈwɔːməndi/ WAW-mən-dee) is a town in Buffalo County in the U.S. state of Wisconsin. The population was 508 at the 2020 census. The census-designated place of Waumandee is located in the town. The ghost town that was Anchorage is located in the town.

== Etymology ==
The name Waumandee is an anglicization of the Dakota word waŋbdi, meaning "war eagle." The town was most likely named for a Santee Dakota village leader known as both "War Eagle" and "Black Dog" who signed the First Treaty of Prairie du Chien in 1825 under the name "Wa-man-de-tun-ka."

== Geography ==
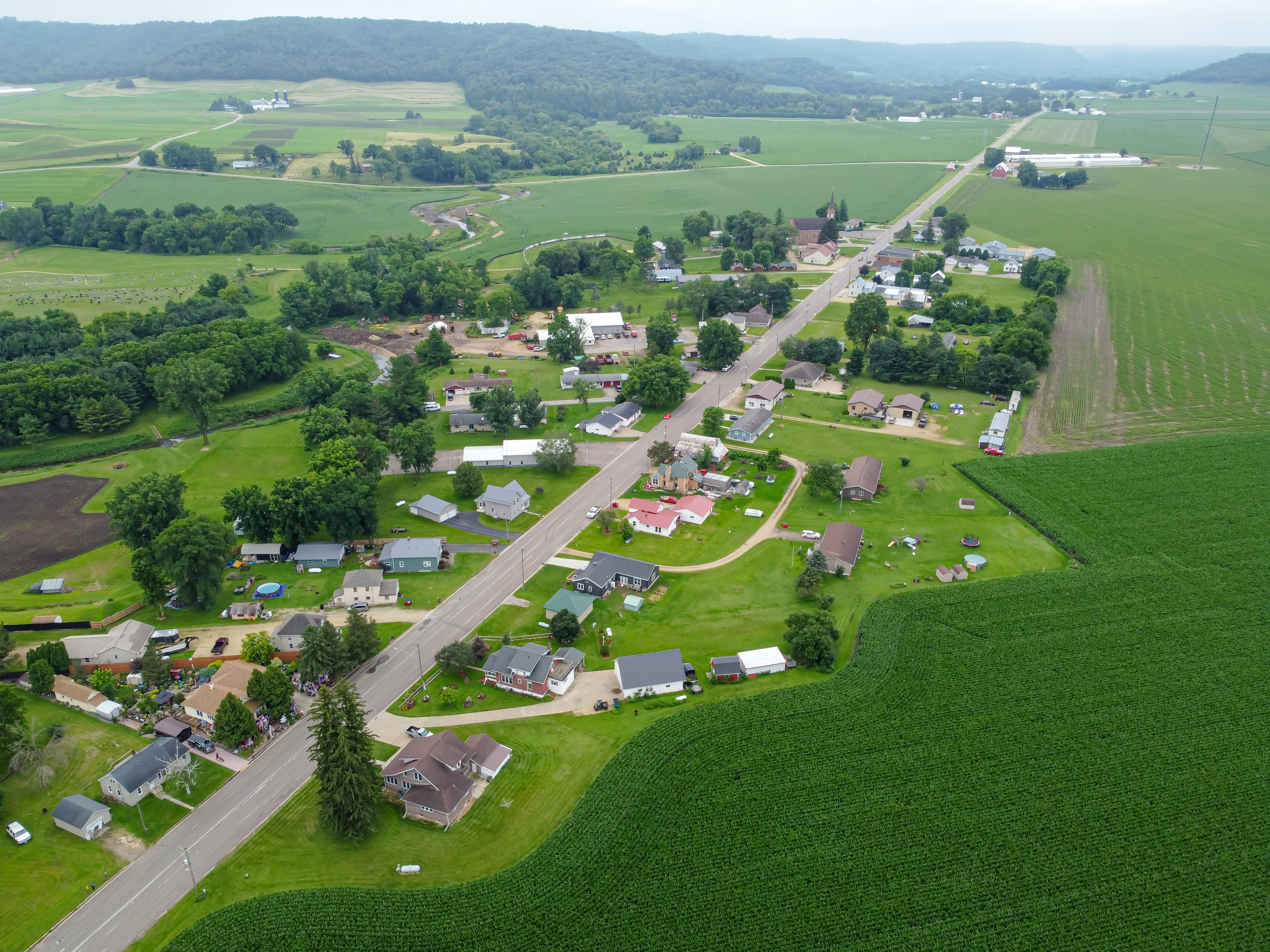

Waumandee is located south of the center of Buffalo County. According to the United States Census Bureau, the town has a total area of 43.8 square miles (113.4 km^{2}), of which 43.5 square miles (112.7 km^{2}) is land and 0.27 square miles (0.7 km^{2}), or 0.58%, is water.

== Demographics ==
As of the census of 2000, there were 515 people, 181 households, and 131 families residing in the town. The population density was 11.8 people per square mile (4.5/km^{2}). There were 198 housing units at an average density of 4.5 per square mile (1.7/km^{2}). The racial makeup of the town was 98.64% White, 0.78% Native American, 0.58% from other races. Hispanic or Latino of any race were 0.97% of the population.

There were 181 households, out of which 38.1% had children under the age of 18 living with them, 64.1% were married couples living together, 5.5% had a female householder with no husband present, and 27.1% were non-families. 23.8% of all households were made up of individuals, and 11.6% had someone living alone who was 65 years of age or older. The average household size was 2.85 and the average family size was 3.36.

In the town, the population was spread out, with 30.3% under the age of 18, 8.3% from 18 to 24, 28.5% from 25 to 44, 19.8% from 45 to 64, and 13.0% who were 65 years of age or older. The median age was 35 years. For every 100 females, there were 101.2 males. For every 100 females age 18 and over, there were 100.6 males.

The median income for a household in the town was $38,375, and the median income for a family was $48,250. Males had a median income of $26,250 versus $21,964 for females. The per capita income for the town was $17,214. About 3.0% of families and 5.8% of the population were below the poverty line, including 10.5% of those under age 18 and 3.3% of those age 65 or over.

== Buildings and structures ==
- Harmonia Hall

== Notable people ==
- Donald Sankey Farner, ornithologist
- Edwin F. Ganz, farmer, newspaper editor, and Wisconsin State Representative
- Alphonse Roy Lejk, Minnesota State Representatives
