= Alma, Wisconsin =

- City
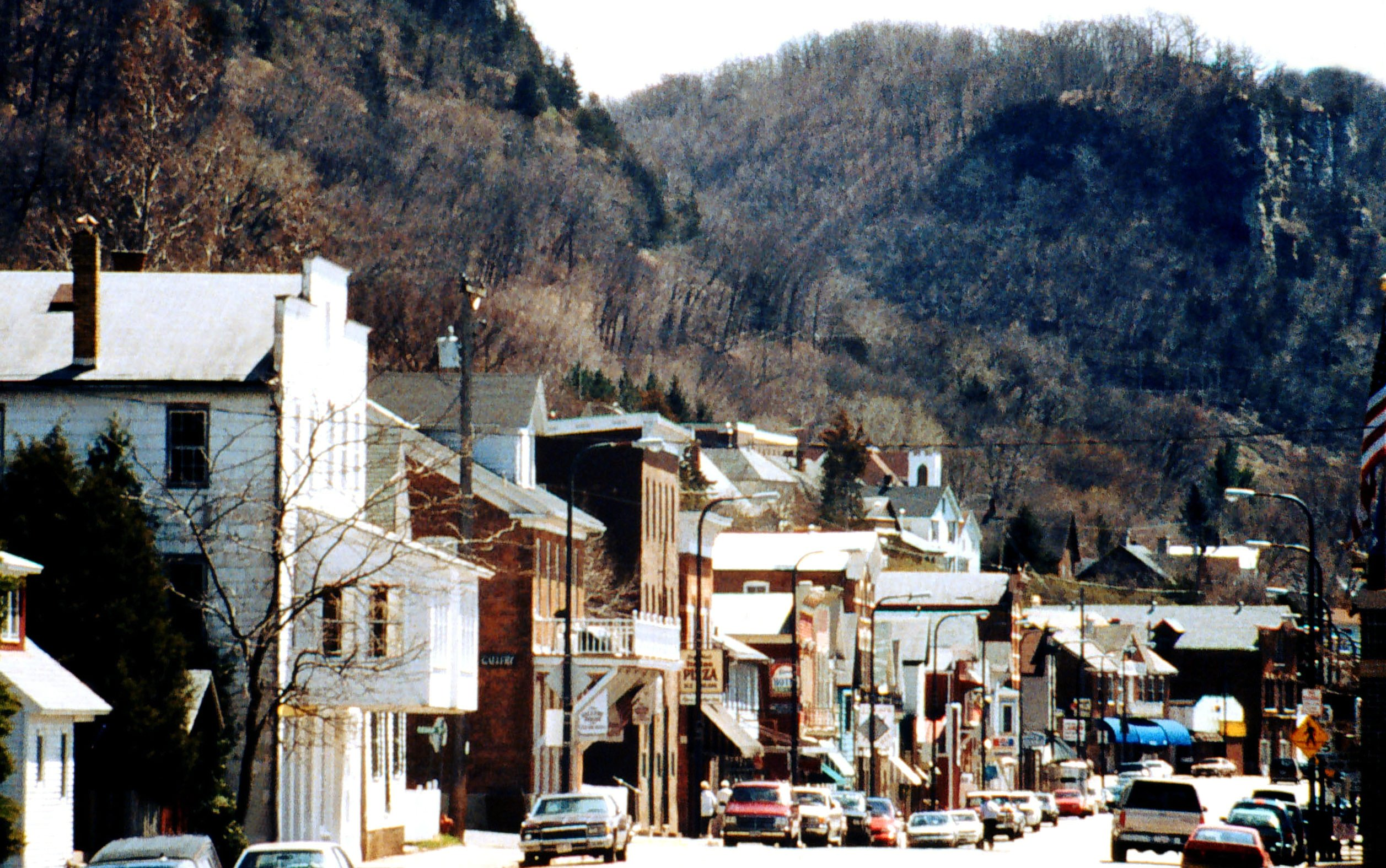
- Alma Historic District

- Location of Alma in Buffalo County, Wisconsin.

- Location within Wisconsin Location within the United States
- Coordinates: 44°20′24″N 91°55′28″W
- Country: United States
- State: Wisconsin
- County: Buffalo

Government
  - Mayor: Robert W. Gross

Area
  - Total: 7.90 sq mi (20.47 km^{2})
  - Land: 5.31 sq mi (13.75 km^{2})
  - Water: 2.59 sq mi (6.72 km^{2})
- Elevation: 673 ft (205 m)

Population (2020)
  - Total: 716
  - Density: 135/sq mi (52.1/km^{2})
- Time zone: UTC-6 (Central (CST))
  - Summer (DST): UTC-5 (CDT)
- Zip Code: 54610
- Area code: 608
- FIPS code: 55-01225
- GNIS feature ID: 1560795
- Website: cityofalmawi.com

Alma is a city in and the county seat of Buffalo County, Wisconsin, United States. The population was 716 at the 2020 census.

== History ==
Alma was named in commemoration of the 1854 Battle of the Alma, in the Crimean War.

== Geography ==
Alma is located on State Route 35, approximately 6 miles (9.7 km) east of Wabasha, Minnesota, or 12.3 miles (19.8 km) by car.

According to the United States Census Bureau, the city has a total area of 7.9 square miles (20.46 km^{2}), of which 5.31 square miles (13.75 km^{2}) are land and 2.59 square miles (6.71 km^{2}) are covered by water.

=== Climate ===
According to the Köppen Climate Classification system, Alma has a hot-summer humid continental climate, abbreviated "Dfa" on climate maps. The hottest temperature recorded in Alma was 101 °F (38.3 °C) on June 11, 1956, while the coldest temperature recorded was −38 °F (−38.9 °C) on January 31, 1996.

Climate data for Alma, Wisconsin, 1991–2020 normals, extremes 1939–present
| Month | Jan | Feb | Mar | Apr | May | Jun | Jul | Aug | Sep | Oct | Nov | Dec | Year |
|---|---|---|---|---|---|---|---|---|---|---|---|---|---|
| Record high °F (°C) | 55 (13) | 62 (17) | 80 (27) | 89 (32) | 94 (34) | 101 (38) | 100 (38) | 101 (38) | 98 (37) | 91 (33) | 78 (26) | 67 (19) | 101 (38) |
| Mean maximum °F (°C) | 44.3 (6.8) | 48.0 (8.9) | 63.1 (17.3) | 77.2 (25.1) | 85.3 (29.6) | 90.4 (32.4) | 91.7 (33.2) | 89.9 (32.2) | 85.9 (29.9) | 79.6 (26.4) | 62.5 (16.9) | 48.2 (9.0) | 93.2 (34.0) |
| Mean daily maximum °F (°C) | 23.9 (−4.5) | 28.8 (−1.8) | 41.2 (5.1) | 55.8 (13.2) | 67.9 (19.9) | 77.3 (25.2) | 80.9 (27.2) | 78.7 (25.9) | 71.4 (21.9) | 57.7 (14.3) | 41.9 (5.5) | 29.1 (−1.6) | 54.6 (12.5) |
| Daily mean °F (°C) | 16.0 (−8.9) | 20.3 (−6.5) | 32.6 (0.3) | 46.0 (7.8) | 58.1 (14.5) | 67.7 (19.8) | 71.6 (22.0) | 69.6 (20.9) | 62.1 (16.7) | 49.1 (9.5) | 34.8 (1.6) | 22.2 (−5.4) | 45.8 (7.7) |
| Mean daily minimum °F (°C) | 8.1 (−13.3) | 11.8 (−11.2) | 24.0 (−4.4) | 36.1 (2.3) | 48.1 (8.9) | 58.0 (14.4) | 62.4 (16.9) | 60.5 (15.8) | 52.9 (11.6) | 40.5 (4.7) | 27.6 (−2.4) | 15.2 (−9.3) | 37.1 (2.8) |
| Mean minimum °F (°C) | −14.5 (−25.8) | −8.6 (−22.6) | 3.2 (−16.0) | 23.3 (−4.8) | 36.0 (2.2) | 46.8 (8.2) | 54.2 (12.3) | 52.2 (11.2) | 39.0 (3.9) | 27.3 (−2.6) | 12.4 (−10.9) | −6.3 (−21.3) | −17.2 (−27.3) |
| Record low °F (°C) | −38 (−39) | −35 (−37) | −27 (−33) | 7 (−14) | 24 (−4) | 36 (2) | 43 (6) | 42 (6) | 25 (−4) | 18 (−8) | −10 (−23) | −32 (−36) | −38 (−39) |
| Average precipitation inches (mm) | 0.95 (24) | 1.01 (26) | 1.85 (47) | 3.51 (89) | 4.81 (122) | 5.68 (144) | 4.59 (117) | 5.00 (127) | 4.13 (105) | 2.61 (66) | 1.92 (49) | 1.11 (28) | 37.17 (944) |
| Average snowfall inches (cm) | 9.9 (25) | 8.6 (22) | 6.6 (17) | 1.6 (4.1) | 0.2 (0.51) | 0.0 (0.0) | 0.0 (0.0) | 0.0 (0.0) | 0.0 (0.0) | 0.1 (0.25) | 1.8 (4.6) | 8.6 (22) | 37.4 (95.46) |
| Average precipitation days (≥ 0.01 in) | 8.6 | 6.4 | 8.3 | 10.7 | 13.0 | 12.7 | 10.2 | 10.4 | 9.3 | 9.7 | 7.4 | 8.1 | 114.8 |
| Average snowy days (≥ 0.1 in) | 5.6 | 4.0 | 2.7 | 0.7 | 0.0 | 0.0 | 0.0 | 0.0 | 0.0 | 0.1 | 1.2 | 5.0 | 19.3 |
Source 1: NOAA
Source 2: National Weather Service

== Demographics ==
Historical population
| Census | Pop. | Note | %± |
|---|---|---|---|
| 1870 | 565 | | — |
| 1880 | 1,244 | | 120.2% |
| 1890 | 1,428 | | 14.8% |
| 1900 | 1,201 | | −15.9% |
| 1910 | 1,011 | | −15.8% |
| 1920 | 970 | | −4.1% |
| 1930 | 1,009 | | 4.0% |
| 1940 | 1,139 | | 12.9% |
| 1950 | 1,068 | | −6.2% |
| 1960 | 1,008 | | −5.6% |
| 1970 | 956 | | −5.2% |
| 1980 | 848 | | −11.3% |
| 1990 | 790 | | −6.8% |
| 2000 | 942 | | 19.2% |
| 2010 | 781 | | −17.1% |
| 2020 | 716 | | −8.3% |
U.S. Decennial Census

=== 2020 census ===
As of the census of 2020, the population was 716. The population density was 134.8 inhabitants per square mile (52.0/km^{2}). There were 479 housing units at an average density of 90.2 per square mile (34.8/km^{2}). The racial makeup of the city was 94.7% White, 1.5% Native American, 0.6% Black or African American, 0.3% Pacific Islander, 0.1% Asian, 1.0% from other races, and 1.8% from two or more races. Ethnically, the population was 2.9% Hispanic or Latino of any race.

=== 2010 census ===
As of the census of 2010, there were 781 people, 386 households, and 202 families living in the city. The population density was 148.2 inhabitants per square mile (57.2/km^{2}). There were 488 housing units at an average density of 92.6 per square mile (35.8/km^{2}). The racial makeup of the city was 98.5% White, 0.1% African American, 0.4% Native American, 0.1% Asian, and 0.9% from two or more races. Hispanic or Latino of any race were 0.6% of the population.

There were 386 households, of which 17.1% had children under the age of 18 living with them, 41.7% were married couples living together, 7.3% had a female householder with no husband present, 3.4% had a male householder with no wife present, and 47.7% were non-families. 41.2% of all households were made up of individuals, and 21% had someone living alone who was 65 years of age or older. The average household size was 1.95 and the average family size was 2.62.

The median age in the city was 50.3 years. 15.4% of residents were under the age of 18; 5.8% were between the ages of 18 and 24; 21.3% were from 25 to 44; 30% were from 45 to 64; and 27.5% were 65 years of age or older. The gender makeup of the city was 51.0% male and 49.0% female.

=== 2000 census ===
As of the census of 2000, there were 942 people, 421 households, and 261 families living in the city. The population density was 160.8 people per square mile (62.1/km^{2}). There were 495 housing units at an average density of 84.5 per square mile (32.6/km^{2}). The racial makeup of the city was 97.03% White, 0.21% Black or African American, 0.85% Native American, 0.32% Asian, 0.11% Pacific Islander, and 1.49% from two or more races. 0.85% of the population were Hispanic or Latino of any race.

There were 421 households, out of which 23.0% had children under the age of 18 living with them, 52.5% were married couples living together, 6.4% had a female householder with no husband present, and 37.8% were non-families. 31.4% of all households were made up of individuals, and 14.5% had someone living alone who was 65 years of age or older. The average household size was 2.20 and the average family size was 2.74.

In the city, the population was spread out, with 19.7% under the age of 18, 7.6% from 18 to 24, 25.5% from 25 to 44, 23.1% from 45 to 64, and 24.0% who were 65 years of age or older. The median age was 43 years. For every 100 females, there were 98.3 males. For every 100 females age 18 and over, there were 97.9 males.

The median income for a household in the city was $34,250, and the median income for a family was $45,625. Males had a median income of $31,806 versus $21,250 for females. The per capita income for the city was $21,885. About 5.6% of families and 8.9% of the population were below the poverty line, including 5.8% of those under age 18 and 14.5% of those age 65 or over.

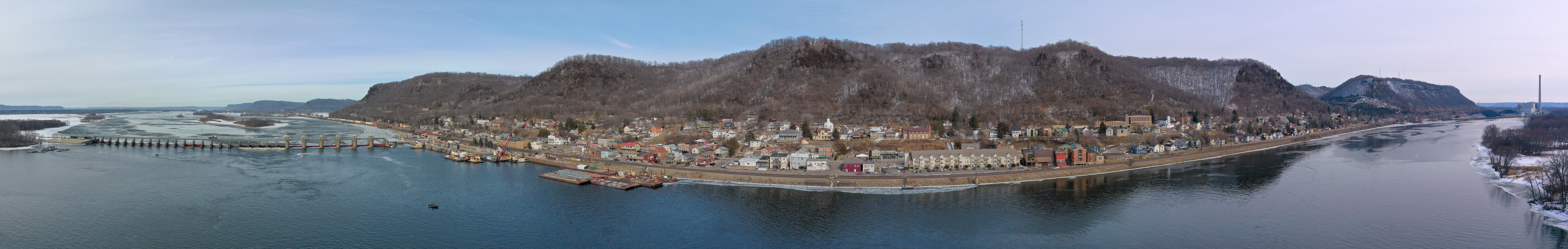
Alma in 2021

== Economy ==
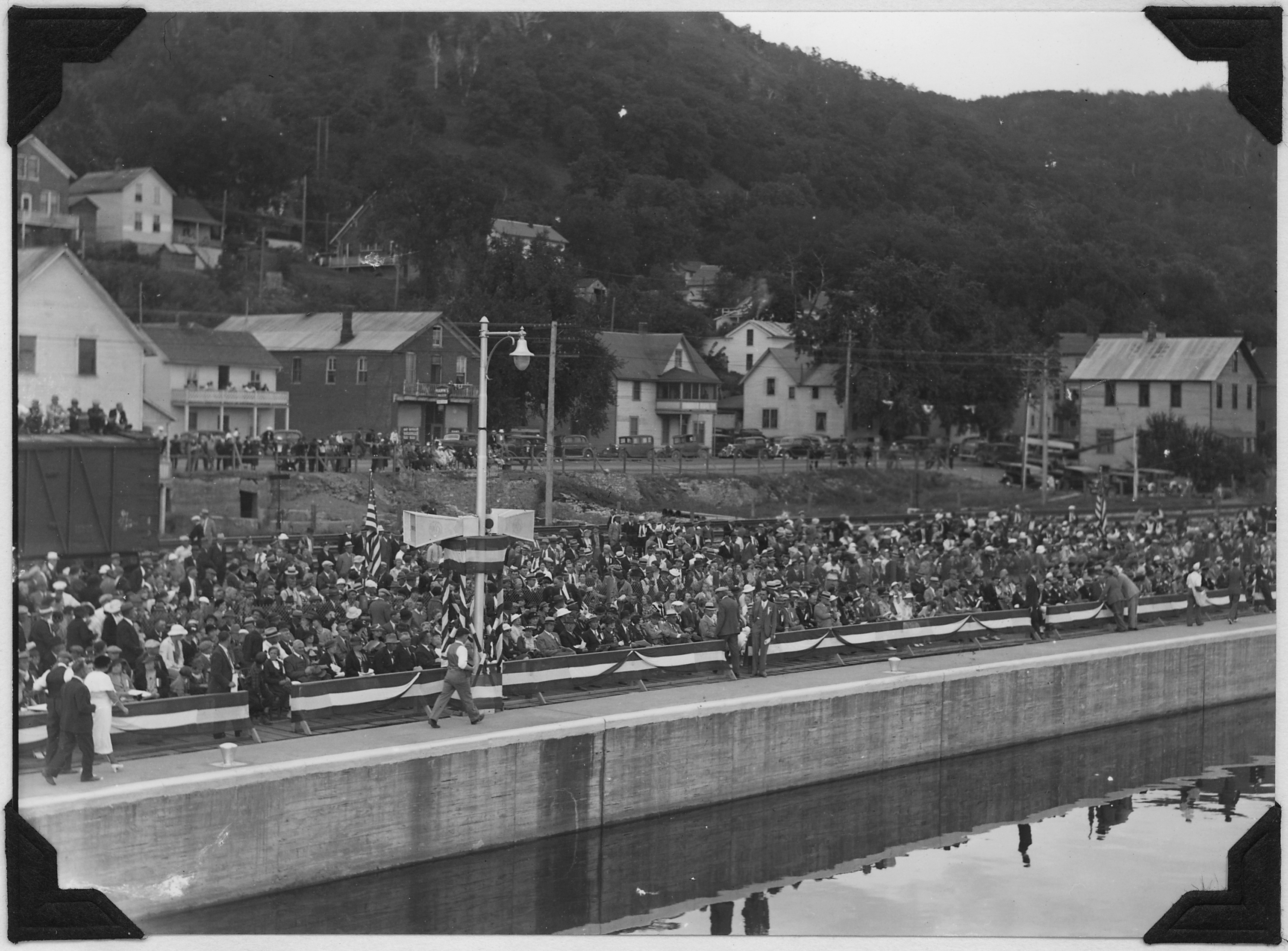
Alma at the 1935 dedication of Lock and Dam No. 4

The Great Alma Fishing Float has been an attraction to tourists, and is particularly popular during the annual walleye run. It is located next to Lock & Dam Number 4 on the Mississippi River. Mississippi River Lock and Dam No. 4, is a major nesting ground for the bald eagles that can be observed with great frequency from Alma's riverbank. Also located in Alma is Castlerock Museum, a collection of arms and armor from the times of the Romans to the Middle Ages.

=== Power stations ===
- Alma Generating Station
- John P. Madgett Generating Station

== Notable people ==
- Carol Bartz, CEO of Yahoo!, former chairman of the board, president, and CEO of Autodesk, Inc.
- John W. DeGroff, Member of the Wisconsin Senate from the 24th district
- Arnold Gesell, psychologist
- Edmund Hitt, Wisconsin state legislator
- Guy LeRoy Hunner, Physician, Johns Hopkins University School of Medicine, Baltimore, Maryland.
- John Hunner, Wisconsin State Treasurer
- Doug Kane, Illinois legislator
- Robert Lees, Wisconsin state legislator
- James Arthur Mathieu, Canadian lumber king
- Conrad Moser, Jr., Wisconsin state legislator
- Peter Polin, Wisconsin politician and businessman
- Frank Schaettle, Wisconsin state legislator
- John Tester, businessman and Wisconsin state legislator
- Kathleen Vinehout, Member of the Wisconsin Senate from the 31st district

== See also ==
- List of cities in Wisconsin
