= Genoa (disambiguation) =

Genoa is a city and port in Liguria, Italy.

Genoa may also refer to:

- The Republic of Genoa, a state in Liguria from ca. 1100 to 1805 with various possessions in the Mediterranean
- the Duchy of Genoa, a formerly independent Ligurian state and Sardinian province

== Places ==
=== Australia ===
- Genoa, Victoria, a town in Australia

=== United States ===
- Genoa, Arkansas
- Genoa, Colorado
- Genoa, Illinois
- Genoa, Minnesota
- Genoa, Nebraska
- Genoa, Nevada
- Genoa, New York
- Genoa, Ohio
- Genoa, Stark County, Ohio, now known as Perry Heights, Ohio
- Genoa, Houston
- Genoa, Wisconsin
- Genoa (town), Wisconsin
- Genoa City, Wisconsin
- Genoa Township, DeKalb County, Illinois
- Genoa Township, Michigan
- Genoa Township, Nance County, Nebraska
- Genoa Township, Delaware County, Ohio

== Other uses ==
- Genoa (sail) or jenny, a type of sail named after the city of Genoa
- Genoa cake, a fruit cake
- Genoa C.F.C., an Italian football (soccer) team based in Genoa
- Genoa City (fictional city), the fictitious setting for the American soap opera The Young and the Restless
- Genoa salami
- Genoa Systems, a defunct manufacturer of graphics adapters
- Epyc Genoa, the code name for a microprocessor sold by AMD
- Project Genoa and Project Genoa II, governmental data analysis projects
- Virginia and Truckee 12 Genoa, a 4-4-0 locomotive used on the Virginia and Truckee Railroad
- Phee Genoa, a treasure hunter in the second season of the animated series Star Wars: The Bad Batch

== See also ==
- Genua (disambiguation)
- Guenoa, a people and language of South America
- Genova (disambiguation)
- Génova (disambiguation)
- Geneva (disambiguation)
- Genoese (disambiguation)
