= Genovese =

Genovese is an Italian surname meaning, properly, someone from Genoa. Its Italian plural form Genovesi has also developed into a surname.

== People ==
- Alfred Genovese (1931–2011), American oboist
- Alfredo Genovese (born 1964), Argentine artist
- Anthony Vincent Genovese (born 1932), American architect
- Bruna Genovese (born 1976), Italian long-distance runner
- Damián Genovese (born 1978), Venezuelan actor and model
- Domenico Genovese (born 1961), English footballer
- Elizabeth Fox-Genovese (1941–2007), American historian
- Eugene D. Genovese (1930–2012), American historian
- Fabio Del Genovese (1902–1976), Italian wrestler
- Frank Genovese (1914–1981), American professional baseball player, manager and scout
- George Genovese (1922–2015), American baseball player and scout
- Leo Genovese (born 1979), Argentine jazz pianist, keyboardist, and composer
- María Noel Genovese (born 1943), Uruguayan model and actress
- Michael Genovese (disambiguation), several people
- Mike Genovese (born 1942), American actor
- Pablo Genovese (born 1977), Argentine footballer
- Paolo Genovese (born 1966), Italian film director
- Richard Genovese (born 1947), American painter
- Rino Genovese (1905–1967), Italian film actor
- Vito Genovese (1897–1969), prominent New York City Mafia Boss
- William Genovese, American computer criminal

== Fictional characters ==
- Phillip Genovese, a character on the television series Crossing Lines

== See also ==
- Murder of Kitty Genovese, widely publicized murder in New York City, 1964
- Genovese syndrome, or bystander effect, named for the Kitty Genovese case
- Genovese crime family, one of the "Five Families" of New York City's Mafia
- Genovese Drug Stores, a defunct pharmacy chain in the NYC area
- Genovese sauce, a meat sauce from Napoli
- Genoese (disambiguation)
- Genovesi
