= Lake Geneva (disambiguation) =

Lake Geneva is a major European lake between Switzerland and France.

Lake Geneva may also refer to:

== Places ==
- Lake Geneva, Alberta, Canada, a locality

=== United States ===
- Lake Geneva, Florida, an unincorporated community
- Lake Geneva (Minnesota), a lake in Douglas County
- Lake Geneva (Washington), a lake in King County
- Lake Geneva, Wisconsin, a city
- Geneva Lake, a lake in Walworth County, Wisconsin

== Other uses ==
- USS Lake Geneva (ID-4215-B)), a United States Navy cargo ship

== See also ==
- Geneva (disambiguation)
