= Ill Will =

Ill Will or Illwill may refer to:

- Ill Will Records, an American record label
- iLL WIll Press. publisher of Neurotically Yours comics
- Illwill Creek, a stream in Kentucky
- Illwill (album), an album by Lake of Tears
- Ill Will, a novel by Dan Chaon
- illwill, the nickname of hacker William Genovese
- UFC 84: Ill Will a 2008 mixed martial arts event
- A character in The Germs comic strip
