= Genov =

Bulgarian surname

Genov (Bulgarian: Генов), feminine: Genova is a Bulgarian surname. It is a patronymic surname derived from the personal name Geno. Notable people with the name include:

- Daniel Genov (footballer, born 1985), Bulgarian footballer
- Daniel Genov (footballer, born 1989), Bulgarian footballer
- Dimitar Genov (born 1947), Bulgarian equestrian
- Nikolai Genov (born 1946), Bulgarian sociologist
- Nikolay Genov (born 1997), Bulgarian male track cyclist
- Petar Genov (born 1970), Bulgarian chess player
- Poli Genova (born 1987), Bulgarian singer, songwriter, actress, and television presenter
- Spas Genov (born 1981), Bulgarian boxer
- Stefan Genov (born 1957), Bulgarian football manager

== See also ==
- Genova (surname)
