= Genova (disambiguation) =

Genoa (Italian: Genova) is a city in Italy.

Genova may also refer to:

- Genova (1953 film), a 1953 Malayalam film directed by F Nagoor
- Genova (2008 film), a 2008 Michael Winterbottom film
- Genova (grape), another name for the Australian wine grape Emperor
- Genova (newspaper 1639–1646), the first newspaper published in Italy
- Genova (newspaper 1642–1684), a 17th-century newspaper published in Genoa
- Genova (surname), a list of people whose surname is Genova
- MV Genova (1921), a passenger ship in service 1948–55

== See also ==
- Genoese (disambiguation)
- Génova (disambiguation)
- Geneva (disambiguation)
- Genoa (disambiguation)
- Genua (disambiguation)
- Jenova (disambiguation)
