= Rise of the Dragon (disambiguation) =

Rise of the Dragon is a 1990 video game

Rise of the Dragon may also refer to:

- The Rise of the Dragon, a 2022 book part of A Song of Ice and Fire series
- Double Dragon Gaiden: Rise of the Dragons, a 2023 video game
- "The Genius That Was China: Rise of the Dragon", an episode of the television series Nova, see list of Nova episodes
- "The Rise of the Dragon: The Modernization of South Korea", a 1994 monograph by Nikolai Genov
- The Rise of the Dragon – Chinese Investment Flows in the Reform Period, a 2008 book by Kerry Brown
- "Rise of Dragon", a single from the 2025 soundtrack Dragon
