= Genovesi =

Genovesi is a surname of Italian origin. It is the plural form of Genovese, stemming from old Italian usage of "dei Genovesi" as a family name, meaning "of the Genoveses". Notable people with this name include:

- Alessandro Genovesi (born 1973), Italian director, screenwriter, playwright and actor
- Anthony J. Genovesi (1936–1998), New York politician
- Antonio Genovesi (1713–1769), Italian writer on philosophy and political economy
- Judi Genovesi (born 1957), American ice dancer
- Marcantonio Genovesi (died 1624), Roman Catholic prelate
- Margaret Baker Genovesi (c. 1933–2022), Australian soprano
- Maura Genovesi (born 1973), Italian sport shooter
- Patrizia Genovesi (born 1962), Italian photographer and video artist
- Pietro Genovesi (1902–1980), Italian football player

== See also ==
- Genovese
- Genoese (disambiguation)
