= Romance, Wisconsin =

- Unincorporated community
- Location within Wisconsin Location within the United States
- Coordinates: 43°33′08″N 91°08′41″W
- Country: United States
- State: Wisconsin
- County: Vernon
- Elevation: 666 ft (203 m)
- Time zone: UTC-6 (Central (CST))
  - Summer (DST): UTC-5 (CDT)
- Area code: 608
- GNIS feature ID: 1577795

Romance is an unincorporated community in the town of Genoa in Vernon County, Wisconsin, United States.

== Religion ==
RoundRiver Institute is a Buddhist retreat and education center located in Romance near the village of Genoa, Wisconsin.
