= La Crosse Boiling Water Reactor =

Decommissioned nuclear power plant near La Crosse, Wisconsin, USA

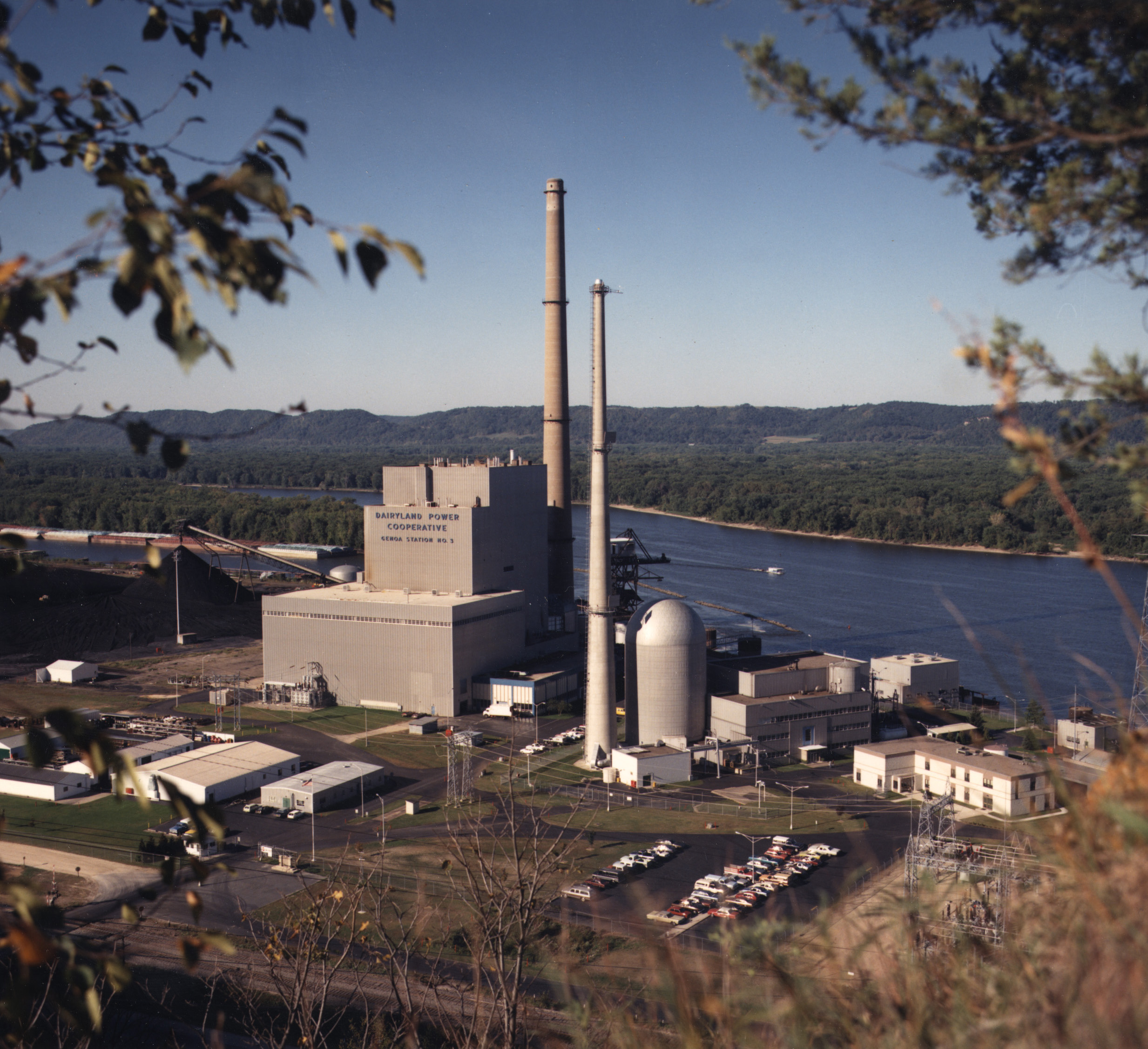
- La Crosse Boiling Water Reactor, smaller domed building in foreground
- Location of La Crosse Boiling Water Reactor within Wisconsin
- Country: United States
- Location: Genoa, Wisconsin
- Coordinates: 43.5601°N 91.2315°W
- Status: Decommissioned
- Construction began: March 1, 1963
- Commission date: November 7, 1969
- Decommission date: April 30, 1987
- Operator: Dairyland Power Cooperative

Nuclear power station
- Reactor type: BWR

Power generation
- Units decommissioned: 50 MW_{e}
- Nameplate capacity: 50 MW_{e}

External links
- Website: www.dairynet.com/energy_resources/lacbwr.php
- Commons: Related media on Commons

La Crosse Boiling Water Reactor (LACBWR) was a boiling water reactor (BWR) nuclear power plant located near La Crosse, Wisconsin in the small village of Genoa, in Vernon County, approximately 17 miles south of La Crosse along the Mississippi River. It was located directly adjacent to the coal-fired Genoa Station #3. The site is owned and was operated by Dairyland Power Cooperative (Dairyland). Although the reactor has been demolished and decommissioned, spent nuclear fuel is still stored at the location.

LACBWR was built from 1963 to 1967. Along with the Dairyland Power Cooperative, funding was provided by the Atomic Energy Commission under its Power Reactor Demonstration Program, intended to demonstrate the viability of peacetime nuclear power. Designed and built by Allis-Chalmers, the reactor began commercial operation in 1969, reaching full capacity by 1971. LACBWR had a 50 MW electrical output from a forced-circulation, direct-cycle boiling water reactor as its heat source. In 1973 the reactor and fuel were transferred in full to Dairyland Power.

== Decommissioning and waste disposal ==
In April 1987, LACBWR was shut down because the small size of the plant made it no longer economically viable. It was placed in SAFSTOR on August 7, 1991. The reactor pressure vessel was removed in May 2007 and shipped to Chem-Nuclear's Barnwell, South Carolina low-level radioactive waste (LLRW) disposal facility. The shipment weighed approximately 310 tons and required a specially designed rail car.

In 2012, spent nuclear fuel from the reactor was sealed into a dry cask storage installation located immediately south of the Genoa Generating Station. Spent reactor fuel continues to be stored on site pending the creation of a national radioactive waste disposal facility such as Yucca Mountain.

In 2016, Dairyland transferred control of the inactive reactor facility to LaCrosseSolutions, a subsidiary of Utah-based EnergySolutions, for the purpose of demolition and decommissioning.

In February 2017, workers spilled about 400 gallons of radioactive wastewater into the Mississippi River after leaving a hose and sump pump in a tank overnight. The wastewater contained Caesium-137 at concentrations greater than allowed under federal regulation for discharge; however, the resulting radiation was below levels considered harmful to human health. In another incident, routine tests from December 2017 to August 2018 detected elevated levels of tritium in groundwater at the site. The tritium was traced to condensation around a vent installed during demolition of the facility and the leak was mitigated before spreading to the Mississippi River.

In 2019, EnergySolutions announced that it had completed the physical demolition of the reactor. The decommissioning of the site was delayed through 2022 pending the evaluation of survey data. In February 2023, the Nuclear Regulatory Commission approved the final decommissioning of the site. This returned the area to unrestricted use, with the exception of the independent spent fuel storage installation maintained by Dairyland Power.

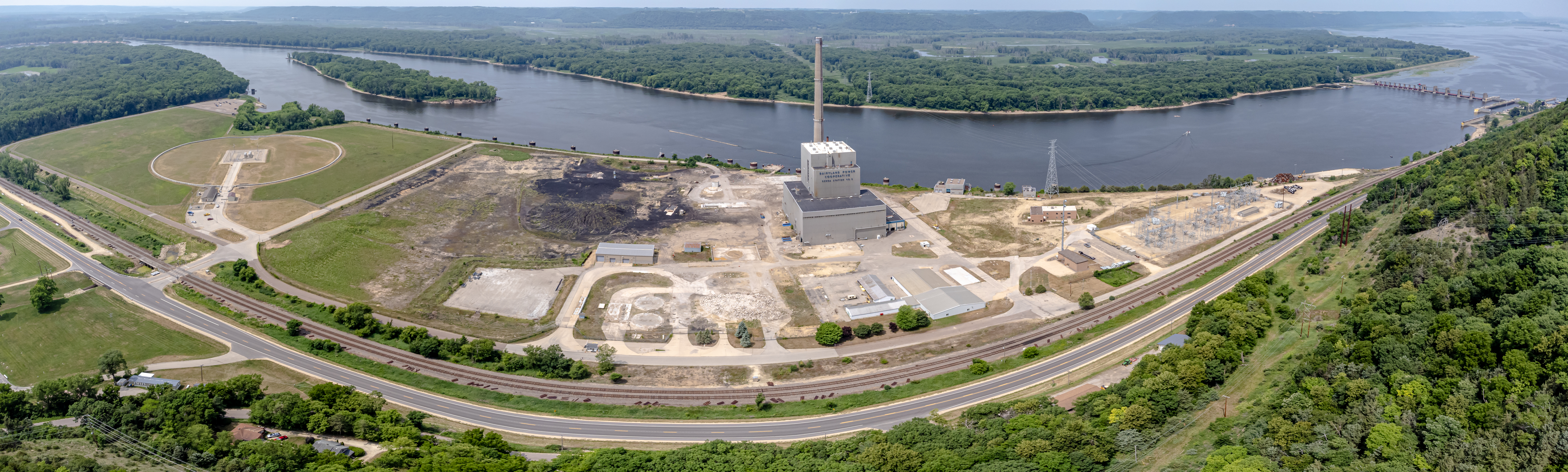
Former Genoa coal power plant and dry cask storage, July 2023. The La Crosse BWR is not in these photos since it was demolished in 2019.
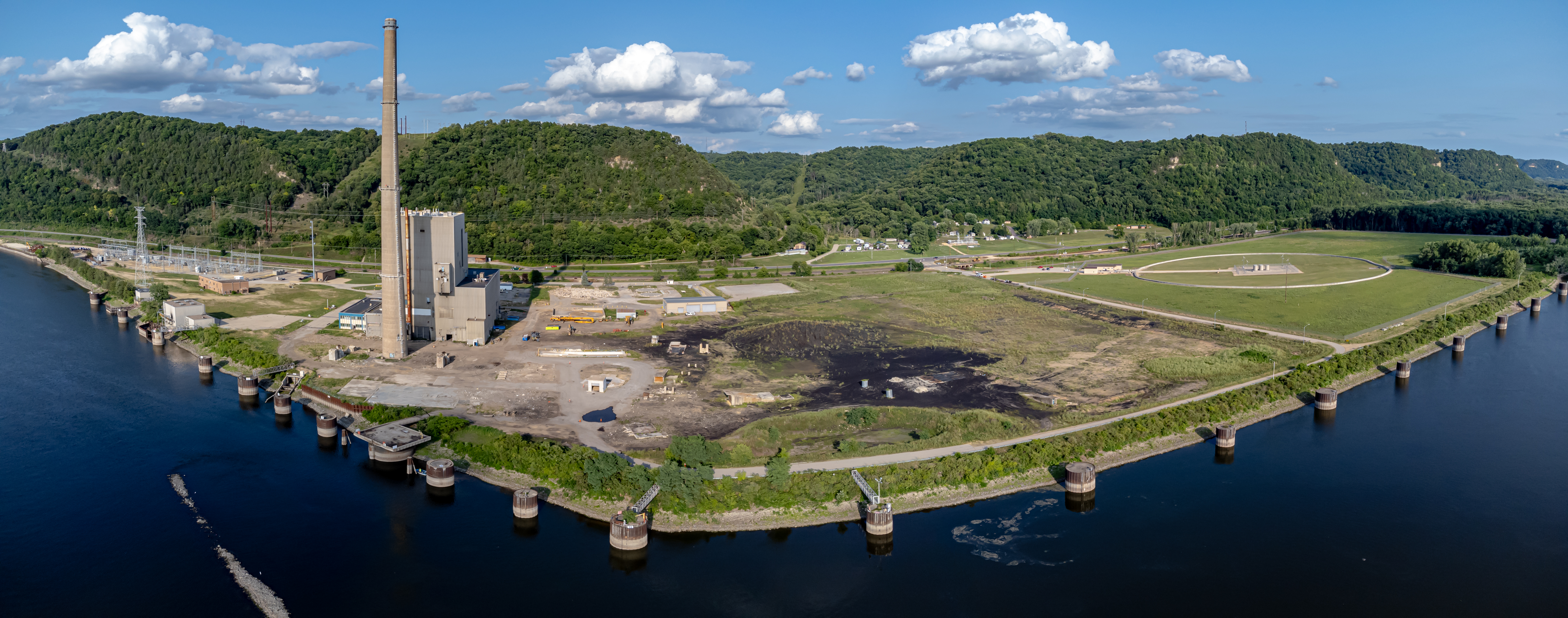

== See also ==
- Lock and Dam No. 8
