= Jenova =

Jenova may refer to:

- Jenova (Final Fantasy), a character in the video game Final Fantasy VII
- Jenova Chen (born 1981), video game developer and the founder of thatgamecompany
- Jenova Martin (1866–1937), Norwegian-American suffragist
- Jenova (film), a 1953 film

== See also ==
- Genoa
- Genova (disambiguation)
