= Lock and Dam No. 8 =

Dam in Minnesota and Wisconsin, U.S.

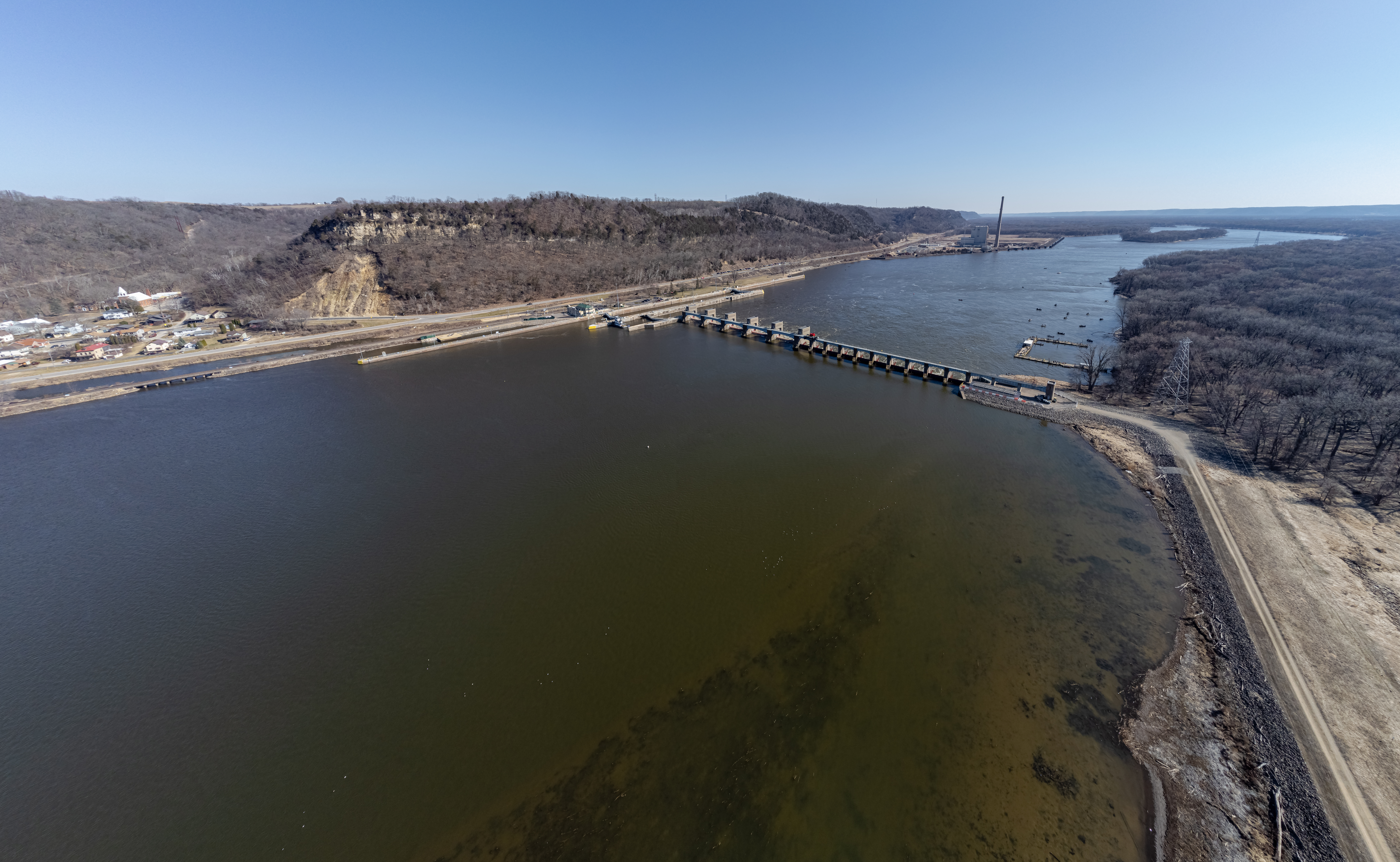
- Mississippi River Lock & Dam #8

- Location within Wisconsin
- Location: Genoa, Vernon County, Wisconsin / Houston County, Minnesota, United States
- Coordinates: 43°34′12″N 91°13′54″W
- Construction began: 1933; 93 years ago
- Opening date: April 1937; 89 years ago
- Operators: U.S. Army Corps of Engineers, St. Paul District

Dam and spillways
- Impounds: Upper Mississippi River

Reservoir
- Creates: Pool 8
- Total capacity: 260,000 acre⋅ft (0.32 km^{3})
- Catchment area: 64,770 mi^{2} (167,800 km^{2})

Lock and Dam No. 8 is a lock and dam located near Genoa, Wisconsin on the Upper Mississippi River near river mile 679.2 in the United States. It was constructed and was put into operation by April 1937. The site underwent major rehabilitation from 1989 to 2003. The lock and dam are owned and operated by the St. Paul District of the United States Army Corps of Engineers-Mississippi Valley Division.

The dam consists of a concrete structure 934 feet (284.7 m) long with five roller gates and 10 tainter gates. The earth embankment is 17,500 feet (5,334.0 m) long with two submersible spillways, 938 feet (285.9 m) long and 1,338 feet (407.8 m) long. The lock is 110 feet (33.5 m) wide by 600 feet (182.9 m) long.

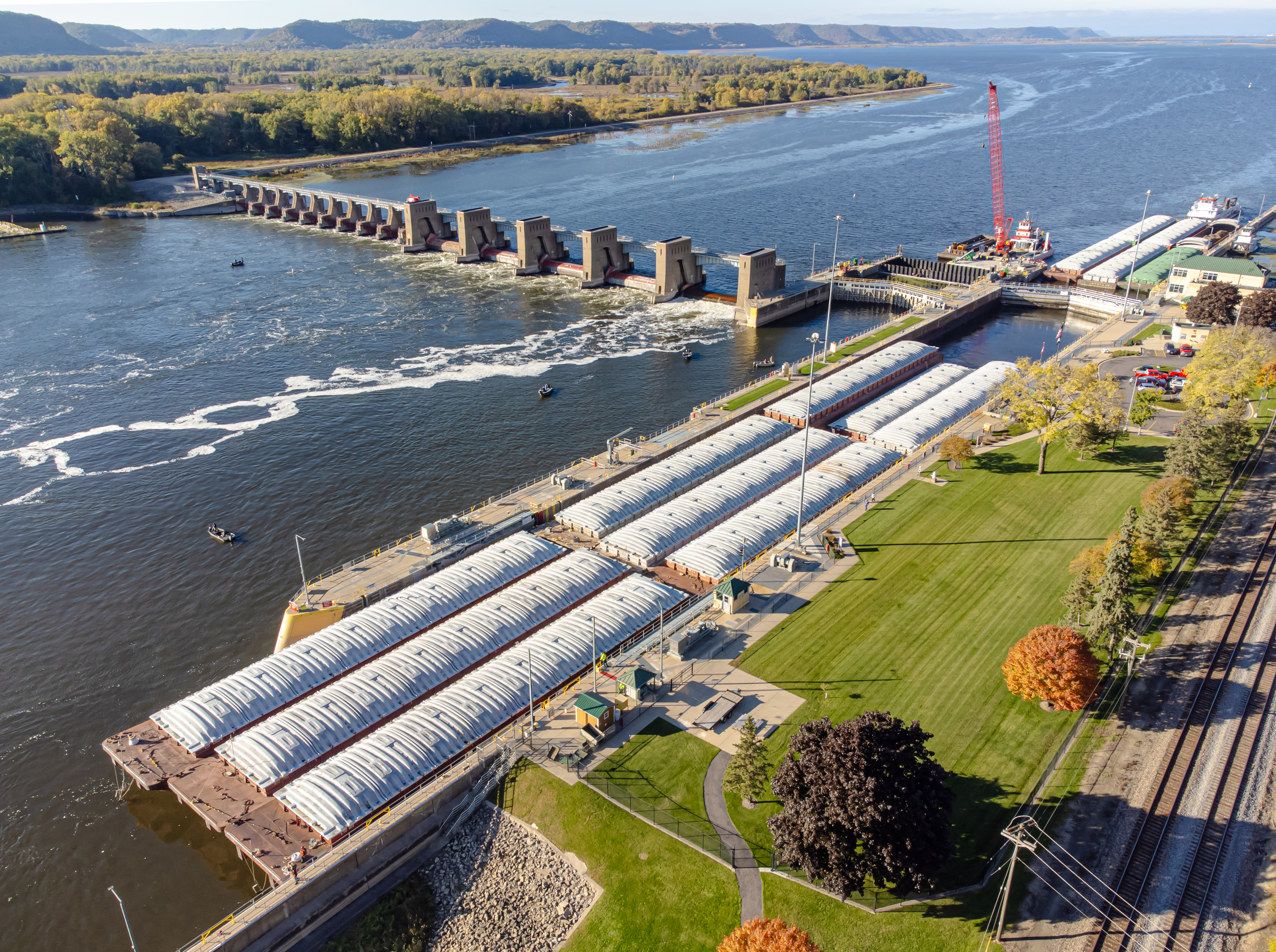

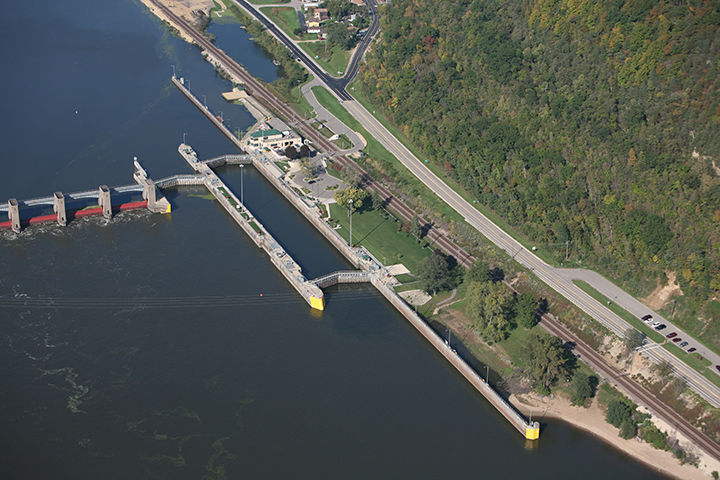
Lock and Dam No. 8

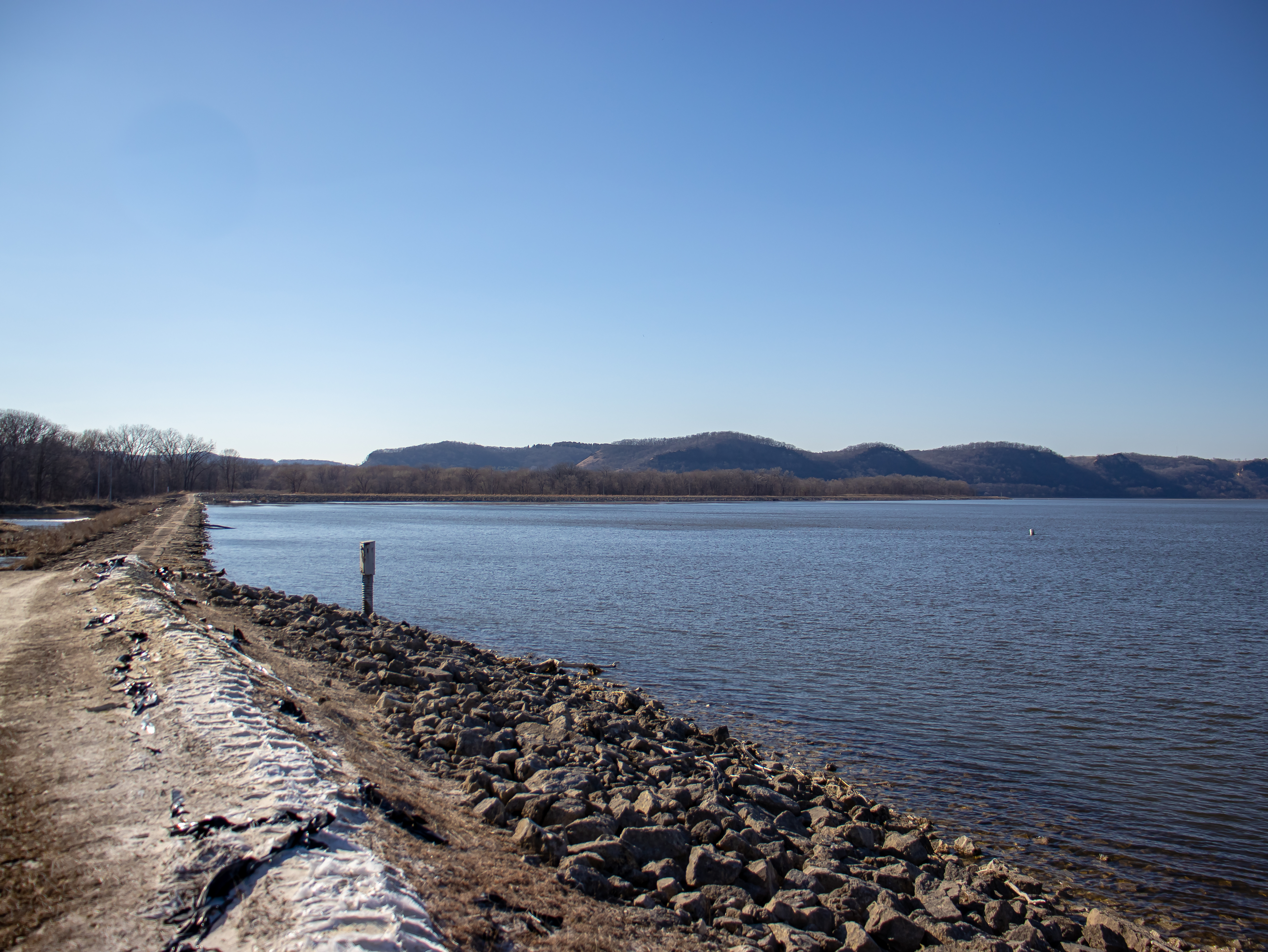
Lock and dam 8 spill way

https://web.archive.org/web/20161226221158/http://www.mvr.usace.army.mil/Portals/48/docs/CC/FactSheets/MISS/UMR%20Locks%20%26%20Dams%20-%202016%20%28MVD%29.pdf

== See also ==
- Public Works Administration dams list
- Upper Mississippi River National Wildlife and Fish Refuge
