= Genoese =

Genoese, Genovese, or Genoan may refer to:

- a person from modern Genoa
- a person from the Republic of Genoa (c. 1100–1805), a former state in Liguria
- Genoese dialect, a dialect of the Ligurian language
- Ligurian language, a Romance language of which Genoese is the prestige dialect, and thus also known by that name

== See also ==
- Genovese, a surname
- Genovesi, a surname
- Genova (disambiguation)
- Genoa (disambiguation)
