= Geneva (disambiguation) =

Geneva is the second-most-populous city in Switzerland.

Geneva may also refer to:

== Geography ==
=== Landforms ===
- Lake Geneva, Switzerland (on which the city is situated)
- Geneva Lake, Wisconsin
- Geneva Spur, a ridge on Mount Everest

=== Regions ===
- Canton of Geneva, of which the city of Geneva is the capital

=== Settlements in the United States ===
- Geneva, Alabama
- Geneva County, Alabama
- Geneva, California
- Geneva, Florida
- Geneva, Georgia
- Geneva, Idaho
- Geneva, Illinois
- Geneva Township, Kane County, Illinois
- Geneva, Indiana
- Geneva, Shelby County, Indiana
- Geneva Township, Jennings County, Indiana
- Geneva, Iowa
- Geneva, Kansas
- Geneva, Michigan
- Geneva Township, Midland County, Michigan
- Geneva Township, Van Buren County, Michigan
- Geneva, Minnesota
- Geneva Township, Minnesota
- Geneva, Nebraska
- Geneva Township, Fillmore County, Nebraska
- Geneva (city), New York
- Geneva (town), New York
- Geneva, Ohio, a city in Ashtabula County
- Geneva, Fairfield County, Ohio, an unincorporated community
- Geneva Township, Ashtabula County, Ohio (also, Geneva-on-the-Lake, Ohio)
- Geneva, Oregon
- Geneva, Pennsylvania
- Geneva, Washington
- Geneva, Wisconsin

=== Structures ===
- Geneva (Alexandria, Louisiana), historic house
- Geneva camp, a refugee camp in Bangladesh
- Geneva College, a private liberal arts college in Beaver Falls, Pennsylvania, U.S.

== Arts and entertainment ==
- Geneva (band), a mid-1990s Scottish rock group
- Geneva (Love of Life Orchestra album), 1980
- Geneva (play), a 1938 satire by George Bernard Shaw
- Geneva (Russian Circles album), 2009
- Geneva (singer) (Ioana Oegar-Toderaș; born 1987), Romanian-American rapper

== Technology ==
- Boule de Genève (Geneva ball), a type of pendant watch in the shape of a small ball
- Geneva ERS, IBM's enterprise reporting system software
- Geneva (typeface), a typeface commonly used in Macintosh computers
- Geneva Steel, a World War II-era steel factory in Vineyard, Utah

== Other uses ==
- Geneva (given name), a feminine given name
- Geneva, an obsolete name for gin

== See also ==
- Geneva Conventions, a set of international treaties chiefly concerning the treatment of non-combatants and prisoners of war
- Geneva Conference (disambiguation), various conferences
- Geneva drive, a mechanism that translates a continuous rotation into an intermittent rotary motion
- "Geneva window", a 1920's stained glass artwork by Irish artist Harry Clarke
- Genova (disambiguation)
- Ginebra (disambiguation)
