= Patrizia Genovesi =

Italian photographer

Patrizia Genovesi (born 1962) is an Italian photographer, video artist, film director, screenwriter and cultural popularizer.

== Education ==
Genovesi has a scientific education combined with studies of art, drawing and painting from the Italian tradition, musical execution and composition, screenwriting with Mario Monicelli, writing with Domenico Starnone, and theatrical direction with Argentinian Renzo Casali.

In photography, she had as teachers Magnum Photo Agency authors Leonard Freed, Richard Kalvar, Abbās ʿAṭṭār and Moises Samam.

In communication and technology, Genovesi attended seminars at Gruppo Galgano in Milan, studied analysis and development of information systems with IBM Italy, and has Google certifications for AIQ (Google Analytics Individual Qualification 2020), Data Journalism e Digital Marketing.

== Career ==
Genovesi draws her inspiration from diverse arts as well as from technology. Her production can hardly be classified within any given artistic trend in photography, cinema and video art. It covers a variety of styles and subjects, ranging from black-and-white to over-saturated color and includes portraits, landscapes, architecture, street photography, light painting, backstage, theatre and orchestra shows, and others. Her projects are often multimedia and combine photographs, videos and music.

In cinema, Genovesi has worked on several shorts as director, screenwriter and director of photography.

Genovesi is active as a cultural disseminator by means of conferences and seminars, both in-presence and online, on topics related to visual arts including photography, painting, cinema, TV and image-related science, including in cooperation with the Roma Tre University, the Italian Space Agency and the National Institute for Nuclear Physics.

Genovesi's photographs of Nobel Prize laureates have been published by the Nobel Prize Organization. Her portrait of Nobel Prize laureate Rita Levi-Montalcini was exhibited in Kamienna Gora, Poland, during the celebrations for Nobel Prize laureate Viktor Hamburger.

Genovesi's portraits of Magnum Photo Agency photographer Leonard Freed are part of the permanent collection of the Charleroi Museum of Photography in Charleroi, Belgium.

The short film Our Comedy, of which she was the screenwriter and director, won the Special Award from the Qualified Jury at the Contesteco 2021 competition and was included in the Official Selection of the Roberto Rossellini International Award 2021. The short film Pasolini, of which she was the screenwriter, director and director of photography, was awarded the First Prize at Contesteco 2022.

Genovesi was among the founders of Artoong, a pioneering web TV project in Italy.

Genovesi is a member of AFIP International (Association of Professional Photographers). In 2021 she joined the "One photograph to change the world" project promoted by WeWorld and Still, two humanitarian organizations, with the aim of fighting famine and malnutrition in Mali and Burkina Faso.

In 2001 she published a collection of poems titled Dancing in Babel.

== Exhibitions ==
=== Solo exhibitions ===
- Sculpting With Light, Mondadori, Rome (2003); Mondadori, Milan (2004); Tempio di Dioniso al Quirinale, Rome (2005); Torretta Valadier, Rome (2006)
- Cinema's People, Auditorium Parco della Musica di Roma, Notebook, Rome (2007)
- Miscellaneous, Balletti Palace Hotel for Mensa International IBD, San Martino al Cimino, Viterbo (2008)
- Coriolan by Ludwig van Beethoven, Milan Malpensa Airport, Milan (2008–2009) and Biblioteca Vallicelliana, Rome (2009)
- Art and Science, Club of the Italian Ministry of Foreign Affairs, Rome (2010) and Club of the Ministry of Military Marine, Rome (2011)
- Art and Science and Retrospective, Italian Institute of Culture, Budapest (2011)
- Image – Historic Garbatella, 3f Gallery, Rome (2012)
- Giuseppe Verdi's Women, Club of the Ministry for Foreign Affairs, Rome (2013) and Centro Leica, Florence (2015)
- Symmetries, rules and schemes in the art of the image, Rome (2017)
- Hildegard of Bingen, Rome (2018)
- Garden Misnake, Rome (2019)
- Rome seen by aliens, Rome (2021), Open Studio Gallery, in cooperation with poet and artist Pipistro
- Ex Machina, Rome (2022), Open Studio Gallery, in cooperation with poet and artist Pipistro

=== Collective exhibitions ===
- Mirame, Palazzo Bastogi, Florence (2012)
- Retrospective, Festa della Cultura, Rome (2012)
- Painters, Grenning Gallery, New York City (2012)
- A man and his Harley-Davidson, Rome, Casa della Fotografia, 2020
- Fuorisalone 2021, Milan, with AFIP International
- MIA Fair 2021, Milan, with AFIP International
- MIA Fair 2023, Milan, with AFIP International

== Selected projects ==
- Ex Machina, exhibited in Rome in 2022 with artist and poet Pipistro, comprises photographs, video, poems and images generated by an artificial intelligence (AI) software to which the poems had been provided as inputs. The project aims at investigating the relationship of humans with AI and its possible future developments.
- Rome seen by aliens, exhibited in Rome in 2021 with artist and poet Pipistro, includes photographs, videos, poems and music and aims at imagining Rome as seen through the eyes of an individual with perceptions, experiences and priorities widely distant from ours.
- Garden Misnake, exhibited in Rome in 2019, includes pictures, music and videos where Eve is pictured as a symbol not only of women but of the whole human species, in its path from the desire for knowledge to full awareness.
- Hildegard of Bingen, exhibited in Rome in 2018, is the result of Genovesi's research on the inspiring a 12th century's German nun, misticist, philosopher, nature scientist, musician, writer, who gained extraordinary authoritativeness in her time's cultural and politic environment.
- Symmetries, rules and schemes in the art of image was exhibited in Rome in 2017. The project was composed of pictures based upon defined mathematic ratios and geometric criteria.
- Giuseppe Verdi's Women was exhibited in 2013 at the Club of Italian Ministry for Foreign Affairs in Rome, Italy, and subsequently at the Centro Leica in Florence in 2015. Focusing on Verdi's female characters, the project is composed of large-size pictures and a set of videos realized as long-shot sequences of artistic performances inspired by La Traviata's Violetta, Macbeth's wife, Attila's Odabella, Aida, Joan of Arc, Il Trovatore's Azucena.
- Art and Science was first exhibited in 2010 at the Club of the Italian Ministry of Foreign Affairs in Rome, and subsequently at the Club of the Italian Ministry of Military Marine, Rome and at the Institute of Italian Culture in Budapest, Hungary, both in 2011. It is a gallery of black and white portraits of world-renowned scientists, including Nobel Prize, Fields Medal or other prize winners Rita Levi-Montalcini, Andrew Wiles, John Forbes Nash Jr., Richard R. Ernst, Edward Witten, Benoît Mandelbrot, and Douglas Hofstadter. With the collaboration of technology expert Corrado Giustozzi, excerpts from the portrayed scientist's works were hidden among the pictures’ pixels to artistically emphasize the link between the thinker and the thought.
- Painters was exhibited in 2012 at the Grenning Gallery, Sag Harbor, New York, USA. It consists of color portraits of a group of painters of the Florence Academy (Ben Fenske, Nelson H. White, Hege Elizabeth Haugen, Ramiro and Melissa Franklin Sanchez) individually shot in their working studios.
- Coriolan by Ludwig van Beethoven was first exhibited at Milan Malpensa Airport between 2008 and 2009 and subsequently at the Vallicelliana Library in Rome in 2009. It is composed of a gallery of frames from Genovesi's black and white video shooting of orchestra conductor Giorgio Proietti executing Beethoven's overture recalling William Shakespeare's Coriolan.
- Cinema's People was exhibited at the Auditorium Della Musica Notebook, Rome, in 2007. It is composed of a gallery of black and white portraits of cinema directors, actors and art directors, including Vincenzo Cerami, David Lynch, Wim Wenders, Stefania Sandrelli

== Cinema ==
- Pasolini, 2022, on the 100th anniversary of the birth of Italian writer and film director Pier Paolo Pasolini, First Prize at Contesteco 2022: director, screenwriter, director of photography, editor
- Our Comedy, 2021, on the 700th anniversary of the death of Dante Alighieri, Special Award of the Qualified Jury at Contesteco 2021 and included in the official selection of the Roberto Rossellini International Award 2021: director, screenwriter, editor
- It's been only a click, 2021: director of photography
