= Michael Genovese =

Michael or Mike Genovese may refer to:

- Michael James Genovese (1919–2006), allegedly a leader of the Pittsburgh crime family
- Mike Genovese (born 1942), American actor
