= Génova =

Génova may refer to:

- Spanish spelling of the city of Genoa, Italy
- Génova, Quindío, a municipality in the department of Quindío, Colombia
- Génova, Quetzaltenango, a municipality in the department of Quetzaltenango, Guatemala
- Génova 13, location of the national headquarters of People's Party of Spain (Partido Popular)

== See also ==
- Genova (disambiguation)
