= Lake Geneva (Minnesota) =

Lake in the state of Minnesota, United States

- Location within Minnesota
- Location: Douglas County, Minnesota
- Coordinates: 45°53′58″N 95°19′39″W
- Type: lake

Lake Geneva is a lake in Douglas County, in the U.S. state of Minnesota.

The lake was named after Lake Geneva, in Switzerland.

== See also ==
- List of lakes in Minnesota
