= Alfredo Genovese =

Fileteador and visual artist (born 1964)

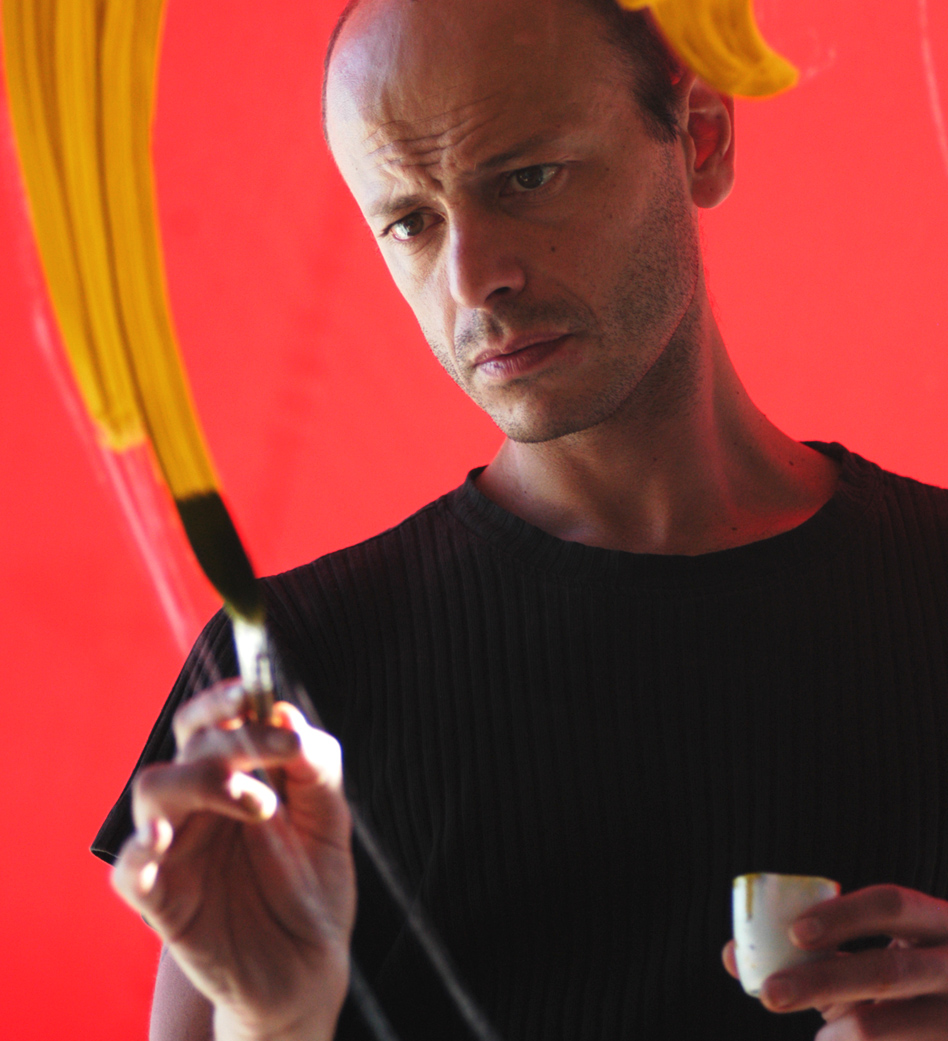
Alfredo Genovese

Alfredo Genovese (born in Buenos Aires, November 24, 1964) is an Argentine fileteador and visual artist. He is also recognized as researcher and teacher, author of several books about fileteado porteño, a typical popular painting from Buenos Aires.

== Training and studies ==
In 1984 Alfredo Genovese began attending the Prilidiano Pueyrredón Fine Art National School, but fileteado was not included in the curricula. So, two years later he was initiated in this art by the master León Untroib, changed gradually his job from lettering to fileteador.

In 1988 he graduated as painting teacher, and began then a five years journey, during which he did all sort of artistic job. He lived two years in Monte San Pietrangeli, Italy, the area where his great-grandfather was from, where he worked in artistic serigraphy and mural painting. He also travel in North Africa, Middle East, China, India, Tibet and Nepal, where he observed and compared all kind of ornamental styles.

In 1993 he came back to Buenos Aires and worked with Cacho Monastirsky in Trompe-l'œil painting.

In 1996 he knows Ricardo Gómez, one of the last cart fileteador master, who transmitted him his craft experience by working together. From 1999 he started to work as body painter, inserting the fileteado in this art, and later in tattoo ambiance.

== Theoretical production and teaching ==
The sources compilation of theorical information and fileteado iconography research allowed Alfredo Genovese to elaborate a study program, give lectures and spread the knowledge of fileteado in Argentina and abroad. From 1998 to 2010 he taught Fileteado Porteño "Ricardo Rojas Cultural Center", which belong to the University of Buenos Aires (UBA).

In 2003 he published his first book, "Tratado de fileteado porteño", a complete compilation about this subject, (re-edited in 2006 and 2009 by Ediciones Porteñas). In 2005 published "Fileteado porteño", in 2006 "Manual del filete porteño" and in 2011 "The book of Filete porteño", the first book entirely in English.

== Artistic production ==
Alfredo Genovese gave a significant boost to filleting porteño to merge with other arts and applications, conceiving it as a syncretic form of design, using new materials and techniques, as in the case of bodypainting and tattoo. His interest in graphic design and digital media are also present in his work. In this way tooled designs created for famous brands and products, for magazine covers, discography and advertising campaigns, including Nike, Evian and MuchMusic.

An original feature is that many of his works play to break filleting stylistic boundaries with unusual technical treatments or through themes political, irreverent or erotic, that are unprecedented.

On June 28, 2012, The Council City of Buenos Aires named Alfredo Genovese "Outstanding Presence in Culture".
