= Illwill Creek =

Stream in Clinton County, Kentucky, U.S.

Coordinates: 36.6322859°N 85.2721832°W

Illwill Creek is a stream in Clinton County, Kentucky, in the United States.

According to tradition, Illwill Creek was so named when pioneers at the site retreated reluctantly (with an "ill will") to hostile Indians.

== See also ==
- List of rivers of Kentucky
