= Ginebra =

Ginebra may refer to:

- Ginebra, Valle del Cauca, a municipality in the department of Valle del Cauca, Colombia
- Ginebra San Miguel, Philippines-based diversified beverage company majority-owned by San Miguel Corporation.
- Barangay Ginebra San Miguel, a Philippines basketball team
- The name of Geneva, Switzerland in Spanish and Catalan
