= Geneva, Fairfield County, Ohio =

Unincorporated community in Ohio, U.S.

Coordinates: 39°39′43″N 82°26′01″W

Geneva is an unincorporated community in Fairfield County, in the U.S. state of Ohio.

== History ==
The community was named after Geneva, in Switzerland, the ancestral land of a large share of the early settlers. A variant name was Flagdale. A post office called Flagdale was established in 1887, and remained in operation until 1903.
