= Genua =

Genua may refer to:

- Genua, an early name for Genoa, a city in Italy (Genua is the Latin, German and ancient Ligurian name for the city, occasionally used in English, especially in historical and archaeological contexts)
- Genua, a fictional city from the Discworld novels by Terry Pratchett
- 485 Genua, a main belt asteroid

== People with the surname ==
- Marcantonio Genua (1491–1563), Renaissance Aristotelian philosopher

== See also ==
- Genoa (disambiguation)
