= Genoa (town), Wisconsin =

Human settlement in Vernon County, Wisconsin, United States of America

Genoa, Wisconsin
- Town
- Town of Genoa
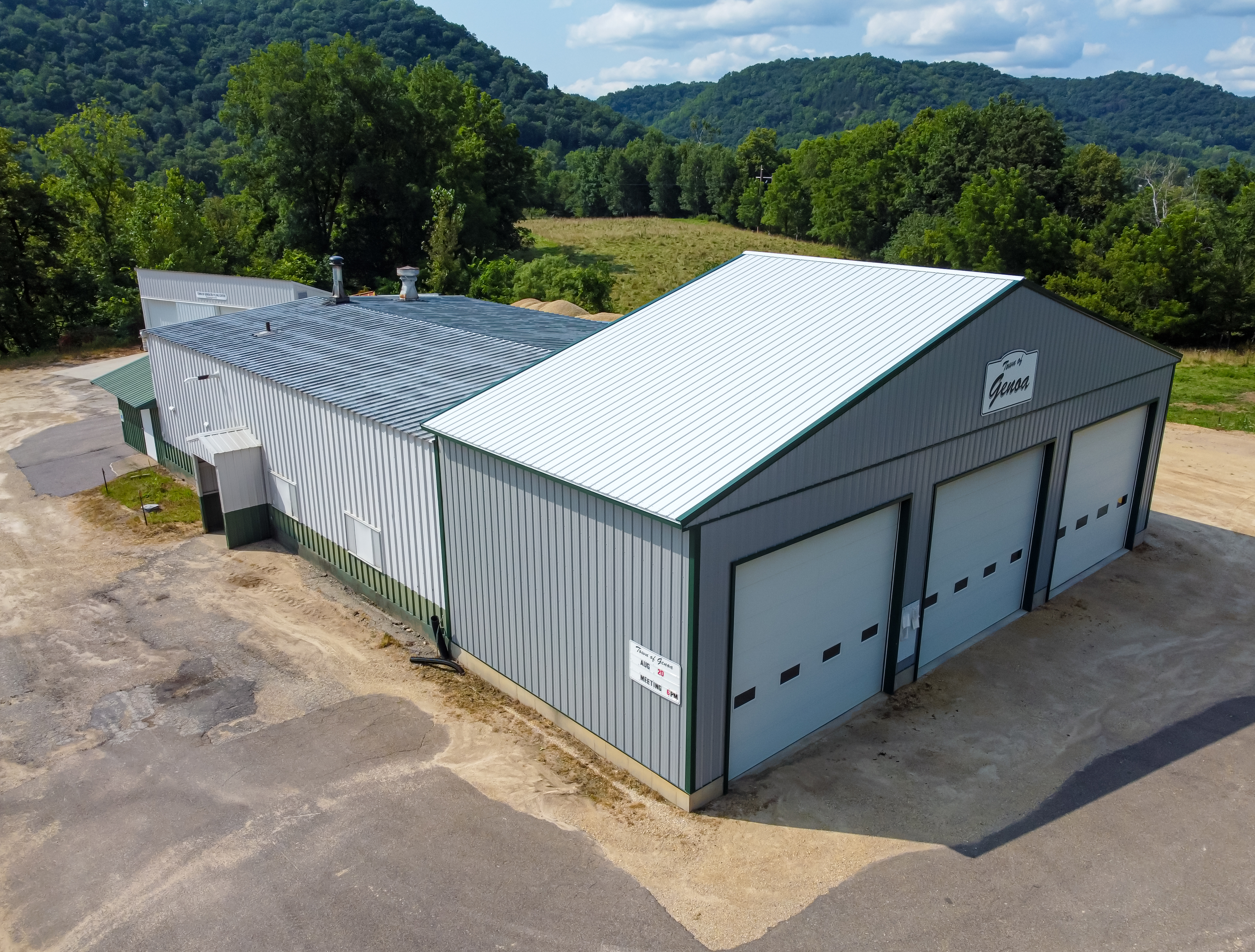
- Genoa Town Hall

- Location within Vernon County, Wisconsin
- Coordinates: 43°32′45″N 91°10′23″W
- Country: United States
- State: Wisconsin
- County: Vernon

Area
  - Total: 36.49 sq mi (94.5 km^{2})
  - Land: 34 sq mi (88 km^{2})
  - Water: 2.49 sq mi (6.4 km^{2})

Population (2020)
  - Total: 753
  - Density: 22/sq mi (8.6/km^{2})
- Time zone: UTC-6 (Central (CST))
  - Summer (DST): UTC-5 (CDT)
- Area code(s): 608 and 353
- GNIS feature ID: 1583263

Genoa is a town in Vernon County, Wisconsin, United States. The population was 753 at the 2020 census. The Village of Genoa is located within the town. The unincorporated community of Romance is also located in the town of Genoa.

== Geography ==
According to the United States Census Bureau, the town has a total area of 36.3 square miles (94.1 km^{2}), of which, 35.0 square miles (90.6 km^{2}) of it is land and 1.3 square miles (3.4 km^{2}) of it (3.66%) is water.

== Demographics ==
At the 2000 United States census there were 705 people in 285 households, including 196 families, in the town. The population density was 20.1 people per square mile (7.8/km^{2}). There were 392 housing units at an average density of 11.2 per square mile (4.3/km^{2}). The racial makeup of the town was 99.15% White, 0.28% from other races, and 0.57% from two or more races. 1.13% of the population were Hispanic or Latino of any race. Of the 285 households 32.3% had children under the age of 18 living with them, 59.6% were married couples living together, 6.3% had a female householder with no husband present, and 30.9% were non-families. 26.0% of households were one person and 8.8% were one person aged 65 or older. The average household size was 2.47 and the average family size was 3.00.

The age distribution was 26.1% under the age of 18, 6.1% from 18 to 24, 29.2% from 25 to 44, 26.2% from 45 to 64, and 12.3% 65 or older. The median age was 38 years. For every 100 females, there were 102.6 males. For every 100 females age 18 and over, there were 106.7 males.

The median household income was $45,234 and the median family income was $49,375. Males had a median income of $35,000 versus $20,750 for females. The per capita income for the town was $17,683. About 6.1% of families and 8.9% of the population were below the poverty line, including 13.9% of those under age 18 and 4.3% of those age 65 or over.
