= Genova (surname) =

Genova is a surname. Notable people with the surname include:

- Aglika Genova (born 1971), Bulgarian pianist and member of Genova & Dimitrov
- Giorgio Di Genova (1933–2023), Italian art historian
- Jackie Genova (fl. 1980s), Australian-born exercise teacher
- Joseph diGenova (born 1945), American lawyer
- Lisa Genova (born 1970), American neuroscientist and author
- Luciano De Genova (1931–2019), Italian weightlifter
- Nicholas de Genova (born 1968), American academic
- Peter J. Genova (1944–2026), American politician
- Poli Genova (born 1987), Bulgarian musical artist
