= Genoa, Wisconsin =

- Village
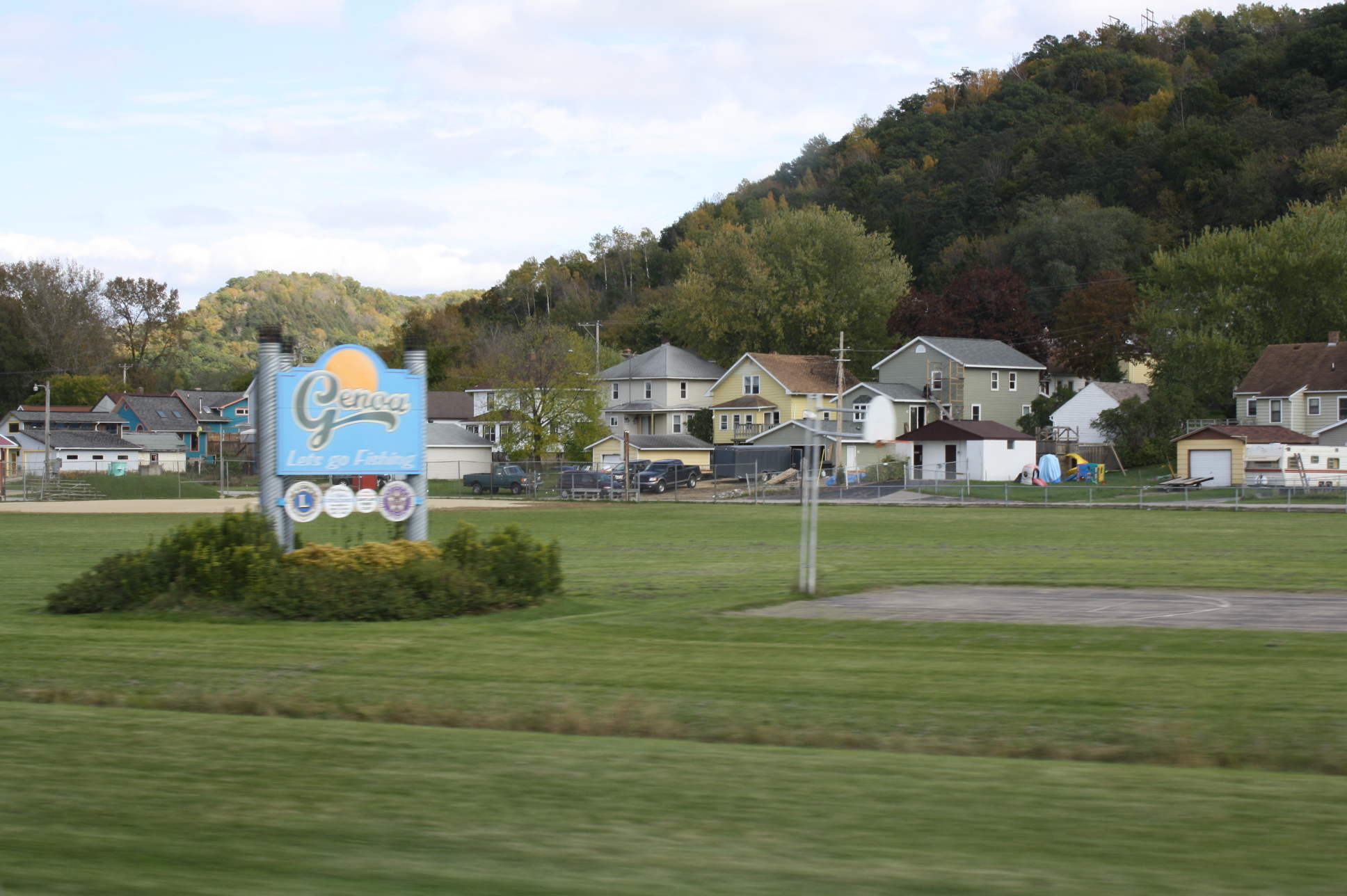
- Welcome sign and downtown

- Location of Genoa in Vernon County, Wisconsin
- Coordinates: 43°34′36″N 91°13′27″W
- Country: United States
- State: Wisconsin
- County: Vernon

Area
  - Total: 0.37 sq mi (0.95 km^{2})
  - Land: 0.36 sq mi (0.93 km^{2})
  - Water: 0.0077 sq mi (0.02 km^{2})
- Elevation: 653 ft (199 m)

Population (2020)
  - Total: 232
  - Density: 730.1/sq mi (281.91/km^{2})
- Time zone: UTC-6 (Central (CST))
  - Summer (DST): UTC-5 (CDT)
- ZIP code: 54632
- Area code: 608
- FIPS code: 55-28650
- GNIS feature ID: 1565460

Genoa is a village in Vernon County, Wisconsin, United States. The population was 232 at the 2020 census. The village is within the Town of Genoa.

== History ==
Originally named Bad Axe for the river, the present-day name of Genoa came in 1868.

== Geography ==
Genoa is located at 43°34′36″N 91°13′27″W (43.5766383, -91.2242996).

According to the United States Census Bureau, the village has a total area of 0.31 square miles (0.80 km^{2}), of which 0.30 square miles (0.78 km^{2}) is land and 0.01 square miles (0.03 km^{2}) is water.

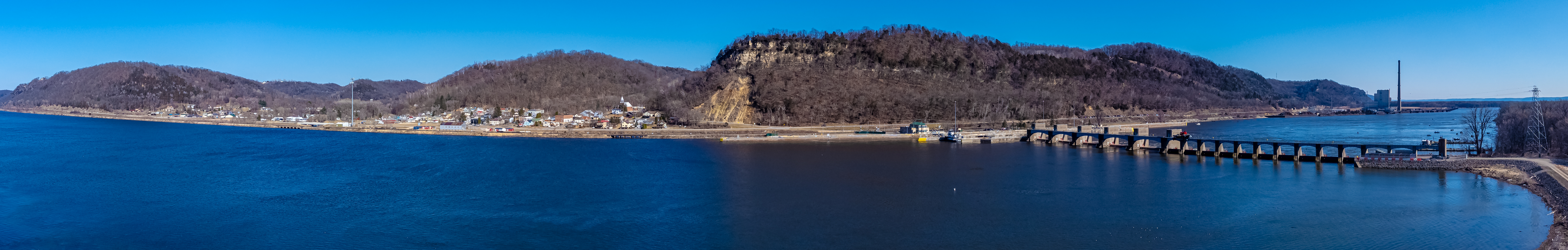
Genoa, Wisconsin with Lock and Dam No. 8

== Climate ==
According to the Köppen Climate Classification system, Genoa has a hot-summer humid continental climate, abbreviated "Dfa" on climate maps. The hottest temperature recorded in Genoa was 109 °F (42.8 °C) on July 13, 1995, while the coldest temperature recorded was −43 °F (−41.7 °C) on January 30, 1951.

Climate data for Genoa, Wisconsin, 1991–2020 normals, extremes 1939–present
Month	Jan	Feb	Mar	Apr	May	Jun	Jul	Aug	Sep	Oct	Nov	Dec	Year
Record high °F (°C)	58 (14)	68 (20)	81 (27)	93 (34)	96 (36)	101 (38)	109 (43)	101 (38)	97 (36)	91 (33)	75 (24)	69 (21)	109 (43)
Mean maximum °F (°C)	45.4 (7.4)	49.6 (9.8)	65.0 (18.3)	78.7 (25.9)	85.9 (29.9)	90.5 (32.5)	92.0 (33.3)	90.8 (32.7)	86.9 (30.5)	79.4 (26.3)	63.7 (17.6)	49.1 (9.5)	94.3 (34.6)
Mean daily maximum °F (°C)	27.3 (−2.6)	32.1 (0.1)	44.7 (7.1)	59.2 (15.1)	71.0 (21.7)	80.1 (26.7)	83.7 (28.7)	81.5 (27.5)	74.2 (23.4)	60.9 (16.1)	45.3 (7.4)	32.3 (0.2)	57.7 (14.3)
Daily mean °F (°C)	19.1 (−7.2)	23.2 (−4.9)	35.6 (2.0)	48.8 (9.3)	60.5 (15.8)	70.2 (21.2)	74.0 (23.3)	71.9 (22.2)	64.3 (17.9)	51.5 (10.8)	37.5 (3.1)	25.3 (−3.7)	48.5 (9.1)
Mean daily minimum °F (°C)	10.9 (−11.7)	14.3 (−9.8)	26.4 (−3.1)	38.4 (3.6)	50.0 (10.0)	60.3 (15.7)	64.2 (17.9)	62.4 (16.9)	54.3 (12.4)	42.0 (5.6)	29.8 (−1.2)	18.2 (−7.7)	39.3 (4.1)
Mean minimum °F (°C)	−14.3 (−25.7)	−8.4 (−22.4)	3.4 (−15.9)	23.7 (−4.6)	35.5 (1.9)	47.6 (8.7)	54.3 (12.4)	52.5 (11.4)	38.8 (3.8)	26.9 (−2.8)	12.7 (−10.7)	−4.5 (−20.3)	−17.7 (−27.6)
Record low °F (°C)	−43 (−42)	−38 (−39)	−31 (−35)	5 (−15)	26 (−3)	36 (2)	46 (8)	41 (5)	28 (−2)	15 (−9)	−9 (−23)	−26 (−32)	−43 (−42)
Average precipitation inches (mm)	1.26 (32)	1.18 (30)	2.09 (53)	3.87 (98)	4.73 (120)	5.88 (149)	4.31 (109)	4.82 (122)	4.16 (106)	2.64 (67)	1.94 (49)	1.52 (39)	38.40 (975)
Average snowfall inches (cm)	9.1 (23)	9.3 (24)	4.9 (12)	1.3 (3.3)	0.0 (0.0)	0.0 (0.0)	0.0 (0.0)	0.0 (0.0)	0.0 (0.0)	0.1 (0.25)	1.5 (3.8)	8.6 (22)	34.8 (88.35)
Average precipitation days (≥ 0.01 in)	8.7	7.5	9.4	11.5	12.8	12.2	10.0	9.6	9.3	9.3	8.4	9.2	117.9
Average snowy days (≥ 0.1 in)	4.7	4.3	1.7	0.4	0.0	0.0	0.0	0.0	0.0	0.1	1.0	4.7	16.9
Source 1: NOAA
Source 2: National Weather Service

== Demographics ==
Historical population
Census	Pop.	Note	%±
1880	150		—
1890	185		23.3%
1900	219		18.4%
1910	267		21.9%
1920	304		13.9%
1930	351		15.5%
1940	339		−3.4%
1950	340		0.3%
1960	325		−4.4%
1970	305		−6.2%
1980	283		−7.2%
1990	266		−6.0%
2000	263		−1.1%
2010	253		−3.8%
2020	232		−8.3%
U.S. Decennial Census

=== 2010 census ===
As of the census of 2010, there were 253 people, 110 households, and 73 families residing in the village. The population density was 843.3 inhabitants per square mile (325.6/km^{2}). There were 120 housing units at an average density of 400.0 per square mile (154.4/km^{2}). The racial makeup of the village was 97.2% White, 1.6% Native American, 0.4% Asian, and 0.8% from two or more races.

There were 110 households, of which 24.5% had children under the age of 18 living with them, 52.7% were married couples living together, 7.3% had a female householder with no husband present, 6.4% had a male householder with no wife present, and 33.6% were non-families. 29.1% of all households were made up of individuals, and 14.6% had someone living alone who was 65 years of age or older. The average household size was 2.30 and the average family size was 2.79.

The median age in the village was 43.8 years. 23.3% of residents were under the age of 18; 8.6% were between the ages of 18 and 24; 18.6% were from 25 to 44; 26.8% were from 45 to 64; and 22.5% were 65 years of age or older. The gender makeup of the village was 51.8% male and 48.2% female.

=== 2000 census ===
As of the census of 2000, there were 263 people, 112 households, and 73 families residing in the village. The population density was 872.4 people per square mile (338.5/km^{2}). There were 120 housing units at an average density of 398.1 per square mile (154.4/km^{2}). The racial makeup of the village was 98.10% White, 0.76% Native American, and 1.14% from two or more races. 0.00% of the population were Hispanic or Latino of any race.

There were 112 households, out of which 25.0% had children under the age of 18 living with them, 53.6% were married couples living together, 8.9% had a female householder with no husband present, and 34.8% were non-families. 25.9% of all households were made up of individuals, and 13.4% had someone living alone who was 65 years of age or older. The average household size was 2.35 and the average family size was 2.90.

In the village, the population was spread out, with 23.6% under the age of 18, 5.7% from 18 to 24, 22.1% from 25 to 44, 28.5% from 45 to 64, and 20.2% who were 65 years of age or older. The median age was 44 years. For every 100 females, there were 96.3 males. For every 100 females age 18 and over, there were 87.9 males.

The median income for a household in the village was $32,857, and the median income for a family was $41,667. Males had a median income of $26,250 versus $19,375 for females. The per capita income for the village was $15,384. About 2.6% of families and 6.9% of the population were below the poverty line, including 7.8% of those under the age of eighteen and 2.7% of those 65 or over.

== Economy ==
The La Crosse Boiling Water Reactor is in Genoa. It was shut down in 1987 and decommissioned. The Genoa Generating Station is now located at the site. The coal plant was retired on June 1, 2021, after more than 50 years of service.

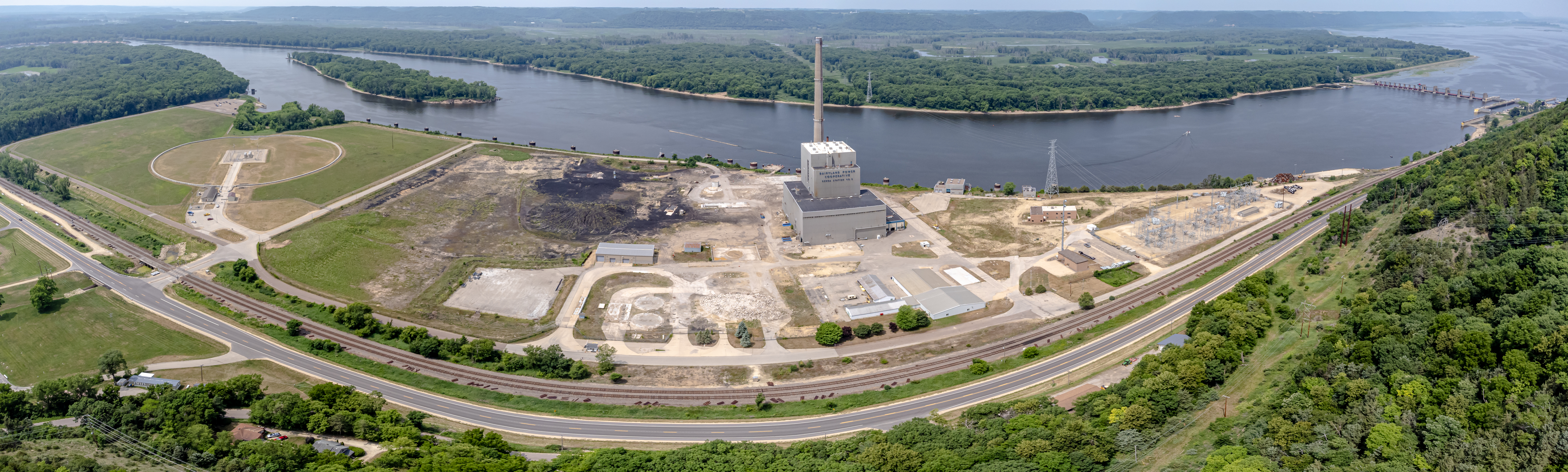
Former Genoa coal power plant

== Education ==
The De Soto Area Schools serves Genoa.

== Transportation ==
Bus service towards La Crosse or Prairie du Chien is provided three times daily per direction by Scenic Mississippi Regional Transit.

Genoa is served by the old Burlington Route line between Chicago and Minneapolis.

== Gallery ==
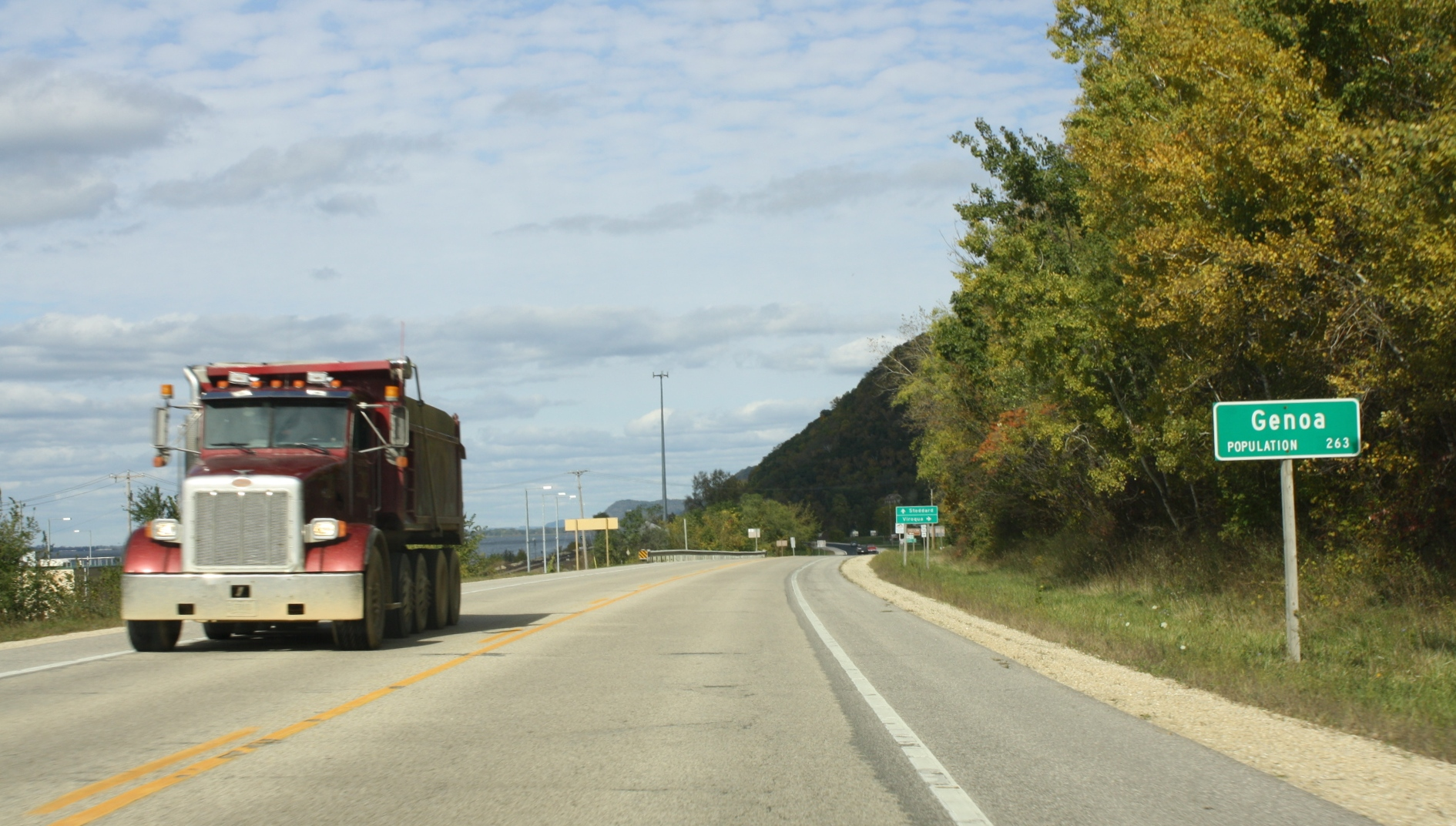
DOT sign along WIS 35

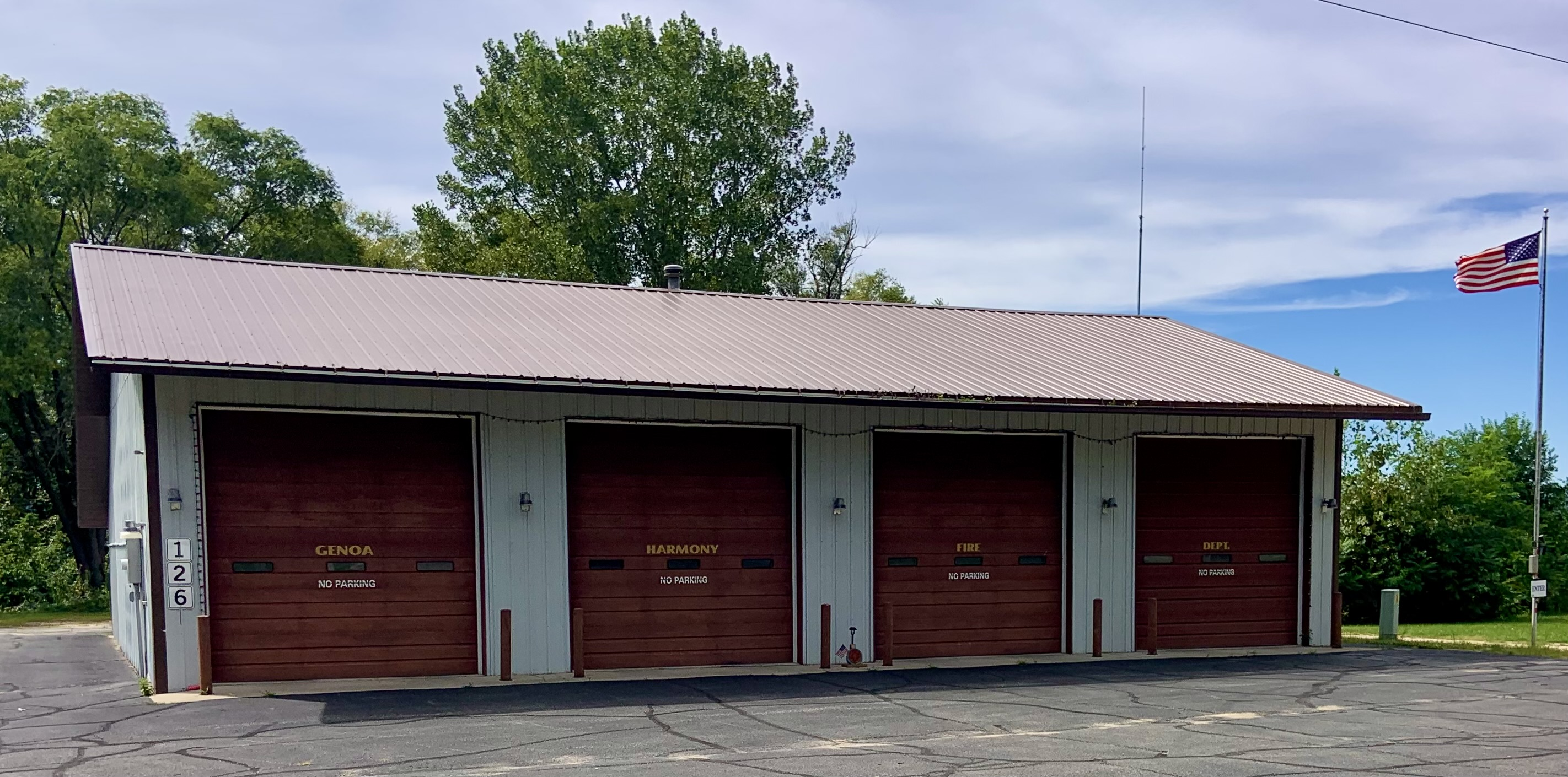
Genoa Fire Station

== See also ==
- Lock and Dam No. 8
