= Nikolai Genov =

Nikolai
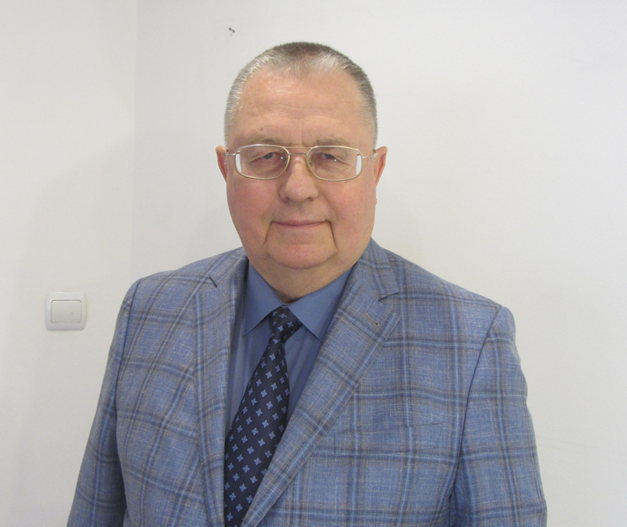
- Genov in 2020
- Education: University of Leipzig (Dr., 1975)
- Known for: Paradigm of social interaction; Four global trends
- Scientific career
- Fields: Sociology
- Workplaces: Professor Emeritus at Free University of Berlin

Nikolai Genov (Bulgarian: Николай Генов/Nikolaj Genow; born 1946) is an internationally active sociologist of Bulgarian origin. He is a professor emeritus of the Free University of Berlin.

== Education and career ==
Genov received his doctorate of Philosophy and Sociology from the University of Leipzig in 1975 and his doctorate of Science from the Bulgarian Academy of Sciences in 1986.

In 1990 he became a professor at BAS. Between 2002 and 2011 he was a professor of sociology at the Institute of Sociology and Institute of Eastern European Studies of the Free University of Berlin. From 2011 to 2016, Genov served as head of the Institute of Global and Regional Development at the School of Advanced Social Studies in Slovenia.

He has been research fellow or visiting professor at the universities of Berkeley, Berlin, Cassel/Bielefeld, Lund, Moscow, Rome, Seoul, and Warsaw. Genov organized the International Varna Sociological School (1980–1990) and has been the Director of the UNESCO/MOST Summer School (2000-2010). From 1998 till 2002 he was Vice-president of the International Council of Social Sciences in Paris. Genov has been involved in the activities of the International Sociological Association in various ways.

He was the leading researcher in five international comparative projects dedicated to the Eastern European societal transformations, interethnic relations and cross-border migration.

== Research and scholarly works ==
Genov’s scientific publications number 380 which have appeared in 29 countries. Until 1989 his research and teaching were mostly focused on topics of sociological theory and history of ideas.

During this period he published the monographs "Talcott Parsons and the Theoretical Sociology" (1982) and "Rationality and Sociology" (1986) (in Bulgarian).

After 1989 his research and teaching became increasingly occupied with transformation processes in various parts of the world and particularly in Eastern Europe. The monographs "The United States at the End of the XXth Century" (1991) and "The Rise of the Dragon: The Modernization of South Korea" (1994), the collection "Risks of the Transition" (1994) (in Bulgarian) dealt with these topics. Building on earlier comparative work on Eastern Europe’s post-1989 transitions, he systematizes “global trends” (e.g., rationalization, individualization) and tests them empirically across regional contexts. Key outputs include Global Trends in Eastern Europe (2010) and the edited volume Global Trends and Regional Development (2012).

The research advances presented in the publications reveal a gradual transition of Genov’s studies towards the development of a synthetic sociological program. It integrates micro-level interactions, organizational dynamics, and macro/global change. He formulated the “paradigm of social interaction” to bridge fragmented theories and to organize inquiry across innovation studies, crisis management, and long-run societal transformations.

The program is elaborated in details in The Paradigm of Social Interaction (Routledge, 2021) with chapters on multi-paradigmatic sociology, upgrading social-innovation studies, and managing crises through social innovation. His monograph Challenges of Individualization (Palgrave, 2018) synthesizes historical and contemporary evidence on the constructive and destructive effects of individualization, a theme he follows in articles on Europeanization and regional transformation. Recent peer-reviewed work refines these concepts: he offers a conceptual breakdown of global trends and argues for “paradigmatic enhancement” of sociology, while applying the interaction framework to organizational transformations, commercialization, consumerism, and homogenization of global culture in the monograph Towards a Diagnosis of Our Times. A Sociological Approach to Global Trends (Routledge, 2025).

== Publications ==
Book publications in English:

- Genov, Nikolai (2025). Towards a Diagnosis of Our Times. London: Routledge. ISBN 978-1-003-66072-9.
- 2021: The Paradigm of Social Interaction. London and New York, ISBN 9781032103617
- 2018: Challenges of Individualization. Palgrave Macmillan, ISBN 978-1-349-95827-6
- 2016: Global Trends in Eastern Europe (reprint). Routledge, ISBN 978-1-138-27874-5
- 2012: Global Trends and Regional Development, (ed.), Routledge, ISBN 978-0-415-89763-1
- 2011: Transboundary Migration in the Post-Soviet Space (co-ed.), Peter Lang, ISBN 978-3-631-61485-3
- 2010: Global Trends in Eastern Europe. Ashgate, ISBN 978-1-4094-0965-6
- 2008: Interethnic Integration in Five European Societies, (ed.) Krämer, ISBN 978-3-89622-096-7
- 2007: Comparative Research in the Social Sciences (ed.), ISSC, ISBN 978-954-8443-13-5
- 2007: Upgrading the Rationality of Organizations. FU, Institute of Eastern European Studies, ISSN 1864-533X
- 2006: Ethnicity and Mass Media in South Eastern Europe. LIT-Verlag (ed.) ISBN 3-8258-9348-0
- 2005: Ethnicity and Educational Policies in South Eastern Europe (ed.), LIT-Verlag, ISBN 3-8258-8594-1
- 2004: Advances in Sociological Knowledge Over Half a Century (ed.), VS-Verlag, ISBN 3-8100-4012-6
- 2004: Ethnic Relations in South-Eastern Europe (ed.) LIT-Verlag, ISBN 3-8258-7869-4
- 2003: Prospects of Sociology in Bulgaria (ed.) REGLO, ISBN 954-8443-09-0
- 2001: Social Sciences in South-Eastern Europe (ed.) ISSC and IZ, ISBN 3-8206-0133-3
- 2001: Recent Social Trends in Bulgaria (co-ed.) McQueens University Press, ISBN 0-7735-2022-8
- 2000: Labour Market and Unemployment in South-Eastern Europe (ed.) ISBN 978-3-89626-216-5
- 2000: Continuing Transformation in Eastern Europe (ed.), Trafo, ISBN 3-924336-02-4
- 1999: Managing Transformations in Eastern Europe, UNESCO/MOST, ISBN 954-8443-08-2
- 1999: Unemployment: Risks and Reactions (ed.)UNESCO/MOST, ISBN 954-8443-07-4
- 1997: Human Development Report Bulgaria 1997 (ed.) ISBN 954-90175-5-9
- 1996: Human Development Report Bulgaria 1996 (ed.) ISBN 954-90175-1-6
- 1995: Human Development Report Bulgaria 1995 (ed.) ISBN 954-8698-03-X
- 1993: Ethnicity and Politics in Bulgaria and Israel (co-ed.) AveburyISBN 1 85628 621 5
- 1993: Society and Environment in the Balkan Countries (ed.) Regional and Global DevelopmentISBN 954-8443-01-5
- 1989: National Traditions in Sociology, SAGE(ed.) ISBN 080-3981-97-X

=== Journals ===
- Genov, Nikolai (16 November 2024). "Conceptualizing Global Trends". World Futures. 80 (8): 615–641. doi:10.1080/02604027.2024.2402040. ISSN 0260-4027.
- Genov, Nikolai (2022). "Building Global Sociology in a Divided World (1949–1990)". Sociological Forum. 37 (1): 111–132. doi:10.1111/socf.12781. ISSN 1573-7861.
- Genov, Nikolai (2021). "Societal transformation: Eastern European experience and conceptualization". International Area Studies Review. 24 (1): 3–17. doi:10.1177/22338659211005589. ISSN 2233-8659.
- Genov, Nikolai (3 May 2020). "Towards a paradigmatic enhancement of sociology". International Review of Sociology. 30 (2): 311–331. doi:10.1080/03906701.2020.1776917. ISSN 0390-6701.
- Genov, Nikolai (2014). "The future of individualization in Europe: changing configurations in employment and governance". European Journal of Futures Research. 2 (1). doi:10.1007/s40309-014-0046-5. ISSN 2195-4194.
- Genov, Nikolai (1998). "Transformation and Anomie: Problems of Quality of Life in Bulgaria". Social Indicators Research. 43 (1–2): 197–209. doi:10.1023/a:1006895413626. ISSN 0303-8300.
- Genov, Nikolai B. (1997). "Four Global Trends: Rise and Limitations". International Sociology. 12 (4): 409–428. doi:10.1177/026858097012004003. ISSN 0268-5809.
- Genov, Nikolai (1991). "Internationalization of Sociology: The Unfinished Agenda". Current Sociology. 39 (1): 1–19. doi:10.1177/001139291039001002. ISSN 0011-3921.
