= Isaac Clark =

19th century American banker and politician

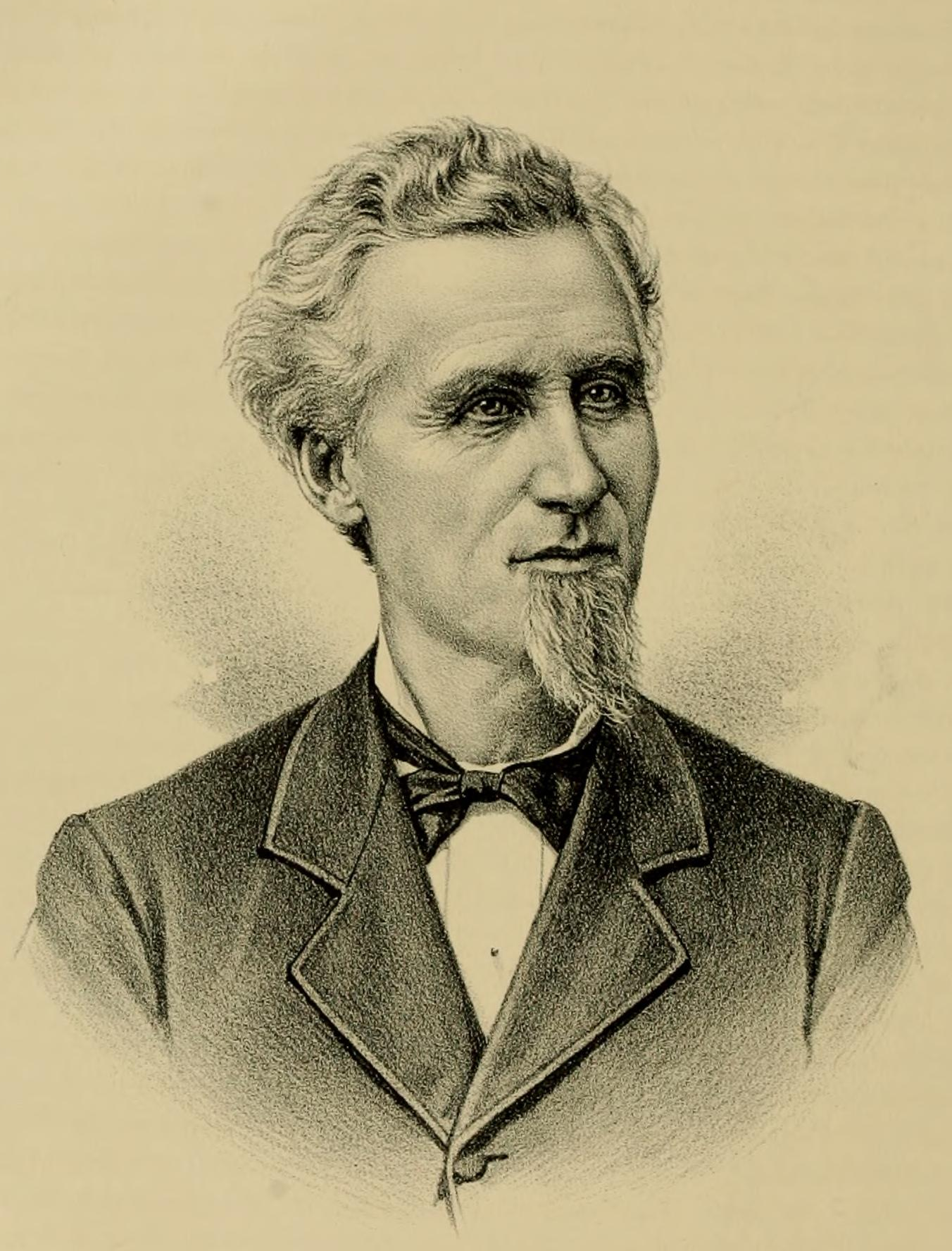
- Portrait from Biographical History of La Crosse, Trempealeau and Buffalo Counties, Wisconsin (1892)

Member of the Wisconsin State Assembly from the Trempealeau district
- In office January 3, 1870 – January 2, 1871
- Preceded by: Douglas Arnold
- Succeeded by: Alexander A. Arnold

Personal details
- Born: January 21, 1826 Franklin County, Maine, U.S.
- Died: September 24, 1894 (aged 68)
- Resting place: Pine Cliff Cemetery, Galesville, Wisconsin
- Party: Republican
- Spouses: Emily French (m. 1849; died 1867); Julia Webb (died 1877); Fra F. Viles (died 1928)
- Children: with Emily French; Eugene, Florence, Genevieve; with Julia Webb; William, Leslie

Isaac Clark (January 21, 1826 – September 24, 1894) was an American farmer, banker, and Republican politician. He served one term in the Wisconsin State Assembly, representing Trempealeau County.

== Biography ==
Isaac Clark was born in Franklin County, Maine, in January 1826. He was raised and educated on his father's farm. In the Fall of 1854, he came west to Wisconsin with his wife and brother-in-law, settling first in Green Lake County. The following Spring, they moved to Trempealeau County and purchased a plot of land just outside the village of Galesville, Wisconsin. He cultivated a successful farm on the property, where he lived for the rest of his life.

In politics, he was first associated with the Whig Party but joined the Republican Party after it was established in the 1850s. On the Republican ticket, he was elected to the Wisconsin State Assembly for the 1870 session, representing Trempealeau County's Assembly district. He was not a candidate for re-election in 1870.

He entered the banking business in the 1880s, first setting up a private bank with W. C. Brooks, then incorporating under the state banking laws as the Bank of Galesville. Clark served as president of the bank from its incorporation until his death. In the 1890s, his bank was described as the most important banking organization in Trempealeau County.

He died of heart failure September 1894.

== Family and legacy ==
Isaac Clark's father was also named Isaac Clark.

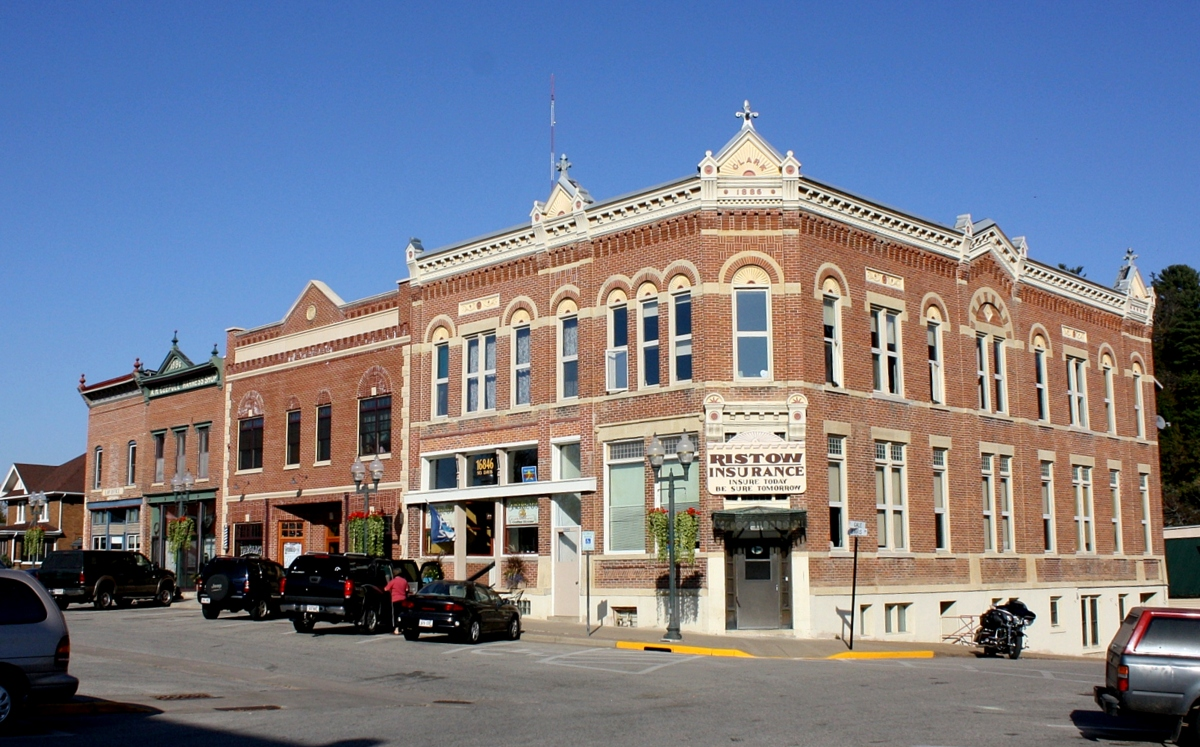
The Clark Block in Galesville, Wis.

He married three times. With his first wife, Emily French, he had at least three children. She died in 1867 and he subsequently married Julia Webb, with whom he had at least two more children. Webb died in 1877, and Clark married Fra F. Viles, who survived him.

In 1886, Clark constructed a solid brick building to house his banking business. The building still stands today in Galesville at the northeast corner of Davis Street and East Gale Avenue—now referred to as the Clark Block. It is part of the Downtown Historic District, in the National Register of Historic Places.

== Electoral history ==
Wisconsin Assembly, Trempealeau District Election, 1869
Party	Candidate	Votes	%	±%
General Election, November 2, 1869
Republican	Isaac Clark	457	59.35%	
Democratic	William M. Young	313	40.65%	
Plurality		144	18.70%	
Total votes		770	100.0%	
Republican hold				

Wisconsin State Assembly
Preceded by Douglas Arnold	Member of the Wisconsin State Assembly from the Trempealeau district January 3, 1870 – January 2, 1871	Succeeded by Alexander A. Arnold
