= George Markham =

George Markham may refer to:

- Sir George Markham, 3rd Baronet (1666–1736), English Member of Parliament
- George Markham (priest) (1763–1822), English Anglican dean
- George Markham (Australian politician) (1822–1864), member of the New South Wales Legislative Assembly
- George H. Markham (1837–1920), member of the Wisconsin State Assembly

== See also ==
- George Markham Giffard (1813–1870), English barrister and judge
