= Alexander A. Arnold =

19th century American politician

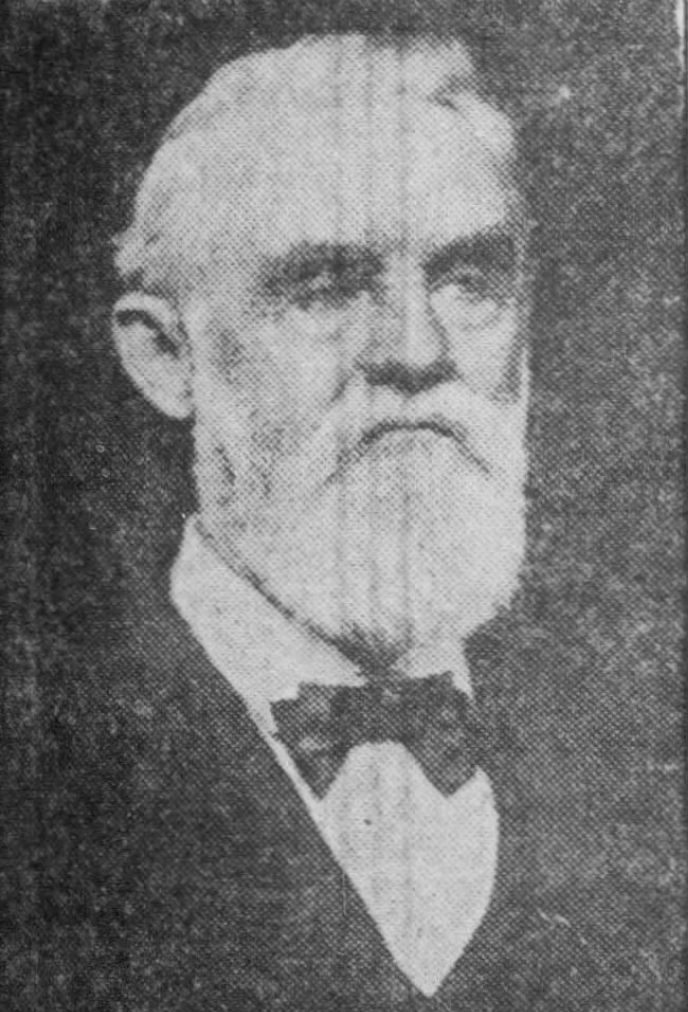
- Portrait from the La Crosse Tribune (Jul. 28, 1911)

33rd Speaker of the Wisconsin State Assembly
- In office January 14, 1880 – January 12, 1881
- Preceded by: David M. Kelly
- Succeeded by: Ira B. Bradford

Member of the Wisconsin Senate from the 29th district
- In office January 1, 1877 – January 6, 1879
- Preceded by: Thomas B. Scott
- Succeeded by: Horace E. Houghton

Member of the Wisconsin State Assembly from the Trempealeau district
- In office January 5, 1880 – January 3, 1881
- Preceded by: George H. Markham
- Succeeded by: Peder Ekern
- In office January 2, 1871 – January 1, 1872
- Preceded by: Isaac Clark
- Succeeded by: Noah D. Comstock

Personal details
- Born: October 20, 1833 Rhinebeck, New York, U.S.
- Died: March 1, 1915 (aged 81) Galesville, Wisconsin, U.S.
- Resting place: Pine Cliff Cemetery, Galesville, Wisconsin
- Party: Republican; Democratic (before 1864)
- Spouses: Hattie E. Tripp (m. 1859; died 1861); Mary D. Douglas (died 1933)
- Children: with Hattie Tripp; G. Blanche Arnold^{(b. 1860; died 1862)}; with Mary Douglas; Archibald Hamilton Arnold^{(b. 1870; died 1957)}; Roy D. Arnold^{(b. 1872; died 1873)}; Kittie H. Arnold^{(b. 1874; died 1877)}; Mollie D. (French)^{(b. 1875; died 1942)}; Gerald Douglas Arnold^{(b. 1882; died 1972)}; Alex W. Arnold^{(b. 1884; died 1956)}
- Education: Ohio Law School
- Occupation: lawyer, livestock breeder

Military service
- Allegiance: United States
- Branch/service: United States Volunteers; Union Army
- Years of service: 1862–1865
- Rank: Captain, USV
- Unit: 30th Reg. Wis. Vol. Infantry
- Battles/wars: American Civil War

Alexander Ahab Arnold (October 20, 1833 – March 1, 1915) was an American lawyer, livestock breeder, and Republican politician from Galesville, Wisconsin. He was the 33rd speaker of the Wisconsin State Assembly and served two years in the Wisconsin State Senate, representing Trempealeau County.

== Early life and education ==
Arnold was born in Rhinebeck, Duchess County, New York, in 1833. He was raised on his father's farm and attended the Starkey Academy, and then Poughkeepsie College. He taught school for a few years then entered the Ohio Law School, where he graduated in 1855. After graduation, he went on to study law in the office of Theodore Miller, in Hudson, New York, and was admitted to the New York bar later that year.

In 1857, Arnold ventured west to Wisconsin and resided for a short time at Elkhorn, Wisconsin, living with a cousin. He was there admitted to the Wisconsin bar and practiced his first case as a lawyer. He traveled to Galesville, Wisconsin, in June 1857, visiting other cousins—W. A. Johnson and Mrs. George A. Smith—and decided to remain there and establish a legal practice. He was elected superintendent of schools in 1861, but resigned in 1862 to enlist in the Union Army.

== Civil War service ==
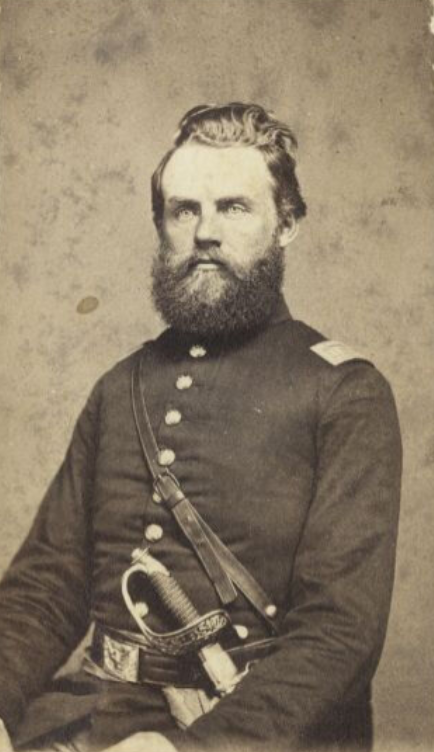
Captain A. A. Arnold, photo by John S. Fuller.

Shortly after the death of his first wife and child, Arnold volunteered for service in the Union Army in the American Civil War. He was enrolled as captain of Company C in the 30th Wisconsin Infantry Regiment and mustered into service in August 1862. The 30th Wisconsin Infantry, unlike the other Wisconsin regiments, operated mostly within the state of Wisconsin enforcing the draft. They were involved in capturing and imprisoning several Ozaukee County draft rioters.

Arnold's company left the state in April 1864, along with three other companies under Colonel Daniel J. Dill, proceeding into the Dakota Territory, via St. Louis. They had been sent to assist James L. Fisk, who had come under attack from hostile Lakota under Sitting Bull. In the Dakota Territory, they assisted in establishing Fort Rice under the direction of General Alfred Sully.

The Wisconsin companies left Fort Rice in October 1864 and proceeded to Louisville, Kentucky, arriving on November 29. The rest of the regiment joined them there in December. They were then organized into the 2nd brigade, 2nd division, Military District of Kentucky, and were assigned to guard a prison in Louisville. Over the next several months, the regiment was distributed to various posts around Kentucky; Colonel Dill was assigned provost marshal general of Kentucky, Lt. Colonel Bartlett was assigned to a court martial detail, Major John Clowney was provost marshal at Frankfort. Captain Arnold was left in command of the remainder of the regiment at Louisville from March 1865 until the regiment was mustered out of service on September 20, 1865.

== Postbellum career ==
On his return from the war, Arnold decided to engage in agricultural pursuits, rather than continuing in the legal profession. In the first year after his return, he purchased additional land, tripling the size of his farm estate. He later nearly doubled his land again, ultimately holding roughly 400 acres. He became a pioneer in the region for breeding shorthorn cattle and Berkshire pigs. He was active throughout the rest of his life with the Trempealeau County Agricultural Society and served two years as president of the State Agricultural Society.

Politically, Arnold began as a Democrat, influenced by the politics of his parents. On the question of slavery, he endorsed the position of Stephen A. Douglas and supported his presidential campaign in 1860. In 1864, however, he cast his vote for Abraham Lincoln, and has been a Republican ever since then.

In 1870, he was elected to his first term in the Wisconsin State Assembly, representing Trempealeau County in the 24th Wisconsin Legislature. He did not run for re-election in 1871.

In 1876, he ran for office again and was elected to the Wisconsin State Senate from the 29th State Senate district, which then-comprised Buffalo, Pepin, and Trempealeau counties.

He was elected to his final term in the Assembly in 1879 and was elected speaker for the 1880 session.

Later in life, he served a number of years as president of the board of trustees of Gale College, and was president of the Galesville & Mississippi Railroad Company until their route was purchased by the Northwestern Railroad Company.

He died March 1, 1915, at his home in Galesville.

== Personal life and legacy ==
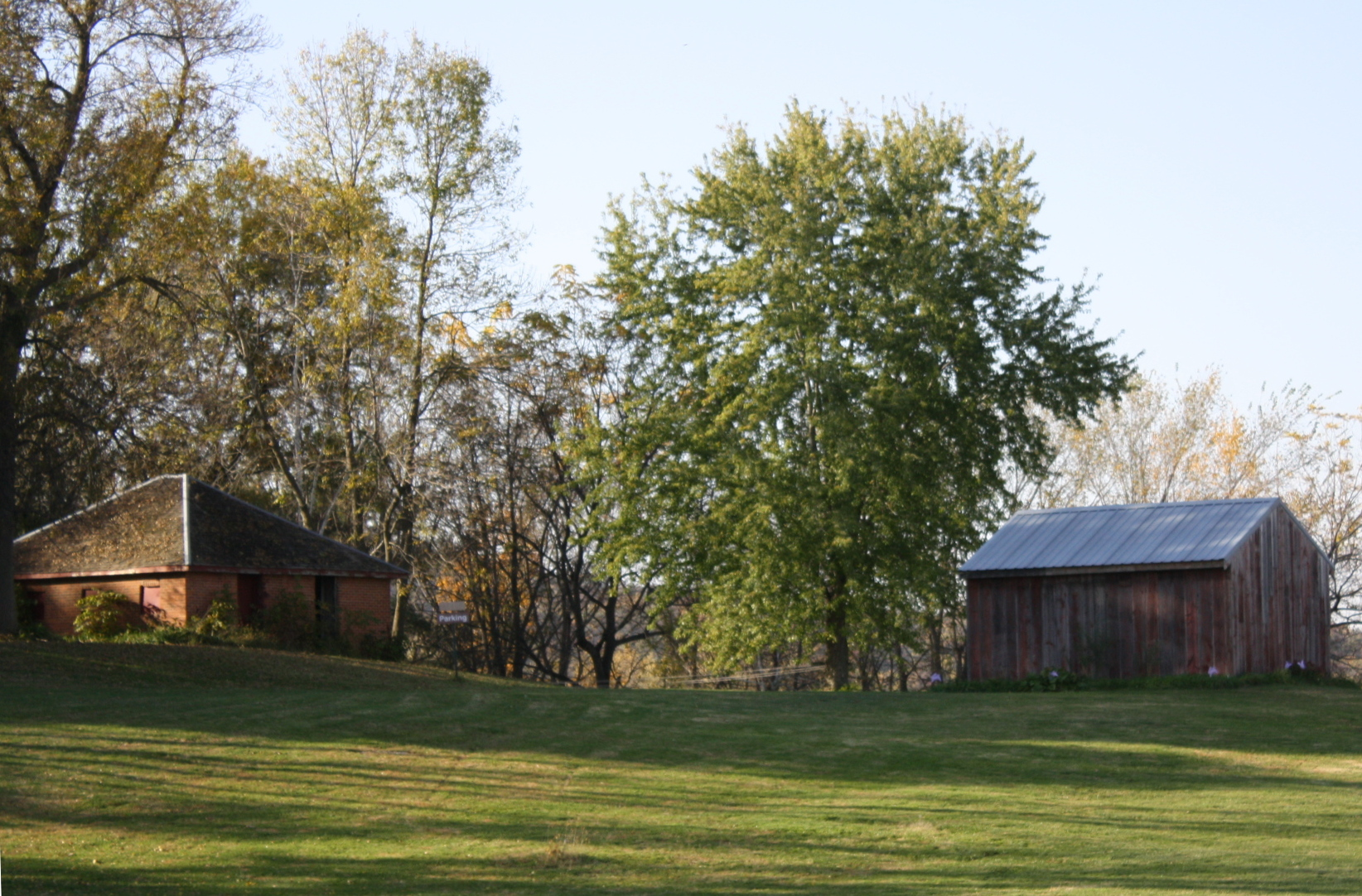
Capt. Alexander A. Arnold Farm in Galesville, Wis.

Alexander Ahab Arnold was the second of seven children born to Archibald H. R. Arnold and his wife Catherine M. E. (née Shultz). His older sister died at age 16.

Alexander Arnold married Hattie Tripp in 1859. Hattie died just two years later in 1861. They had one child together, Blanche, but the child died in 1862. Arnold subsequently married Mary D. Douglas on February 1, 1869. Arnold and his second wife had six more children, though only four survived to adulthood.

Arnold was a prominent mason, and was one of the organizers of the Grand Army of the Republic lodge in Galesville, and was the first commander of the lodge.

Arnold's farmstead estate was described a particularly beautiful, and so still remains today. It is identified as the Capt. Alexander A. Arnold Farm in the National Register of Historic Places.

== Electoral history ==
=== Wisconsin Assembly (1870) ===
Wisconsin Assembly, Trempealeau District Election, 1870
Party	Candidate	Votes	%	±%
General Election, November 8, 1870
Republican	Alexander A. Arnold	516	43.77%	−15.58%
Democratic	G. W. Follett	459	38.93%	−1.72%
Independent	D. C. Van Slyke	204	17.30%	
Plurality		57	4.83%	-13.87%
Total votes		1,179	100.0%	+53.12%
Republican hold				

=== Wisconsin Senate (1876) ===
Wisconsin Senate, 29th District Election, 1876
Party	Candidate	Votes	%	±%
General Election, November 7, 1876
Republican	Alexander A. Arnold	4,327	66.09%	
Democratic	George F. Freeman	2,220	33.91%	
Plurality		2,107	32.18%	
Total votes		6,547	100.0%	
Republican hold				

=== Wisconsin Assembly (1879) ===
Wisconsin Assembly, Trempealeau District Election, 1879
Party	Candidate	Votes	%	±%
General Election, November 4, 1879
Republican	Alexander A. Arnold	1,227	51.51%	−17.16%
Greenback	Even Evenson	884	37.11%	+8.85%
Democratic	E. W. Moore	271	11.38%	
Plurality		343	14.40%	-26.01%
Total votes		2,382	100.0%	-20.52%
Republican hold				

Military offices
Preceded by Lt. Col. Edward M. Bartlett	Command of the 30th Wisconsin Infantry Regiment; March 1865 – September 20, 1865	Regiment abolished
Wisconsin State Assembly
Preceded by Isaac Clark	Member of the Wisconsin State Assembly from the Trempealeau district January 2, 1871 – January 1, 1872	Succeeded by Noah D. Comstock
Preceded by George H. Markham	Member of the Wisconsin State Assembly from the Trempealeau district January 5, 1880 – January 3, 1881	Succeeded by Peder Ekern
Preceded by David M. Kelly	Speaker of the Wisconsin State Assembly; January 14, 1880 – January 12, 1881	Succeeded by Ira B. Bradford
Wisconsin Senate
Preceded by Thomas B. Scott	Member of the Wisconsin Senate from the 29th district January 1, 1877 – January 6, 1879	Succeeded by Horace E. Houghton
