= Capt. Alexander A. Arnold Farm =

- U.S. National Register of Historic Places
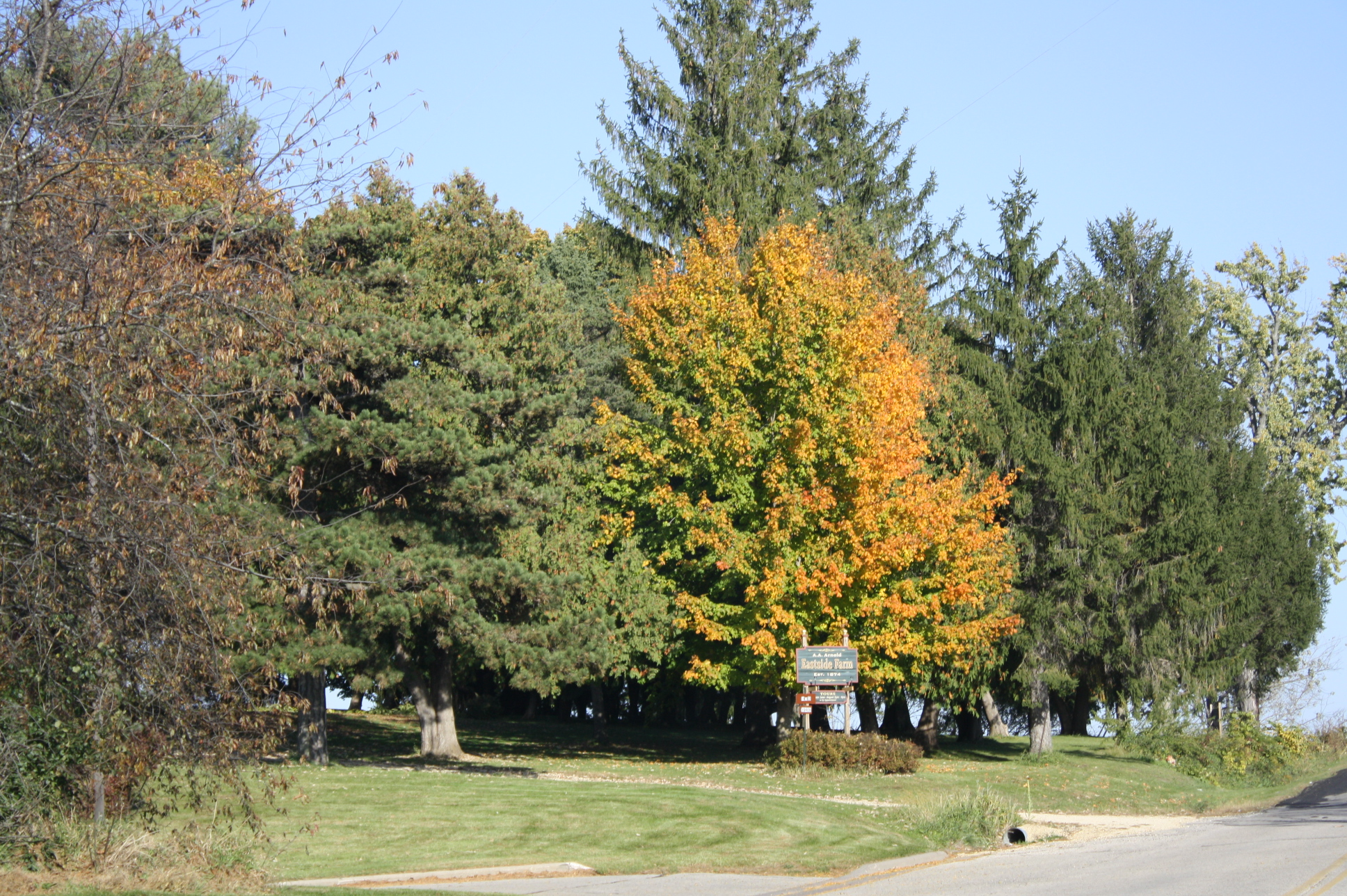
- Alexander Arnold "Eastside Farm"
- Location: Galesville, Wisconsin
- Coordinates: 44.09258°N 91.34003°W
- Built: 1900
- Built by: Alexander A. Arnold and Samuel Luce
- Architectural style: Italianate
- NRHP reference No.: 78000142

The Capt. Alexander A. Arnold Farm is located in Galesville, Wisconsin, USA, near U.S. Route 53 across from Gale-Ettrick-Trempealeau High School at 19408 Silver Creek Road. The farm once belonged to the Speaker of the Assembly and State Senator Alexander Ahab Arnold. He designed and built the farm with Samuel Luce. Arnold used the farm to raise shorthorn cattle. At the time, the 400-acre (160 ha) lot held a two-story farmhouse with 15 rooms and a New York-style barn. The farmhouse is a brick structure. It was added to the National Register of Historic Places in 1978.

In 1983, the community formed an organization to restore the farm called the Garden of Eden Preservation Society. As of 2018, it continued work on the project. It is open for tours on Sundays in June, July and August.

== Gallery ==
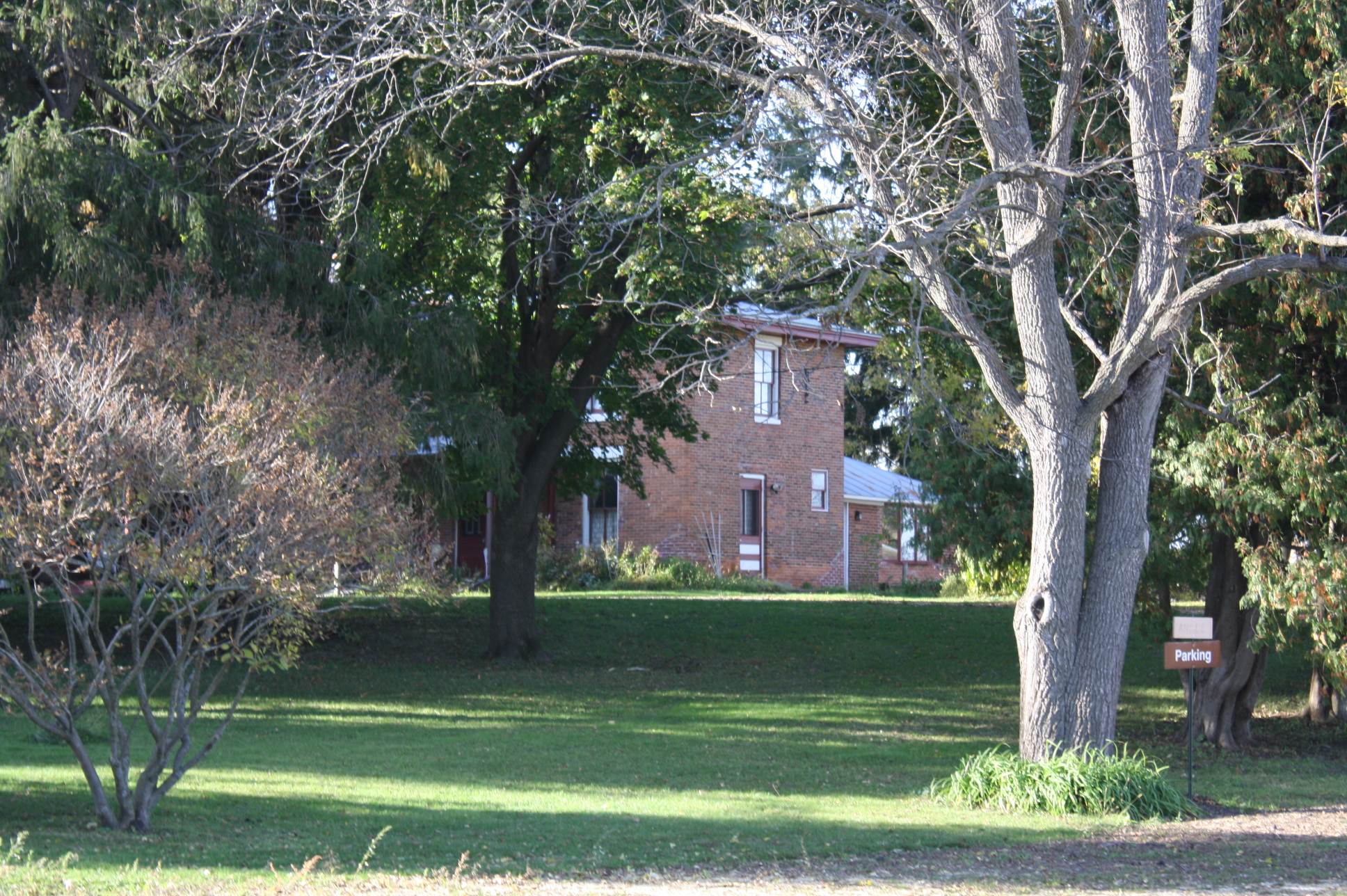
House

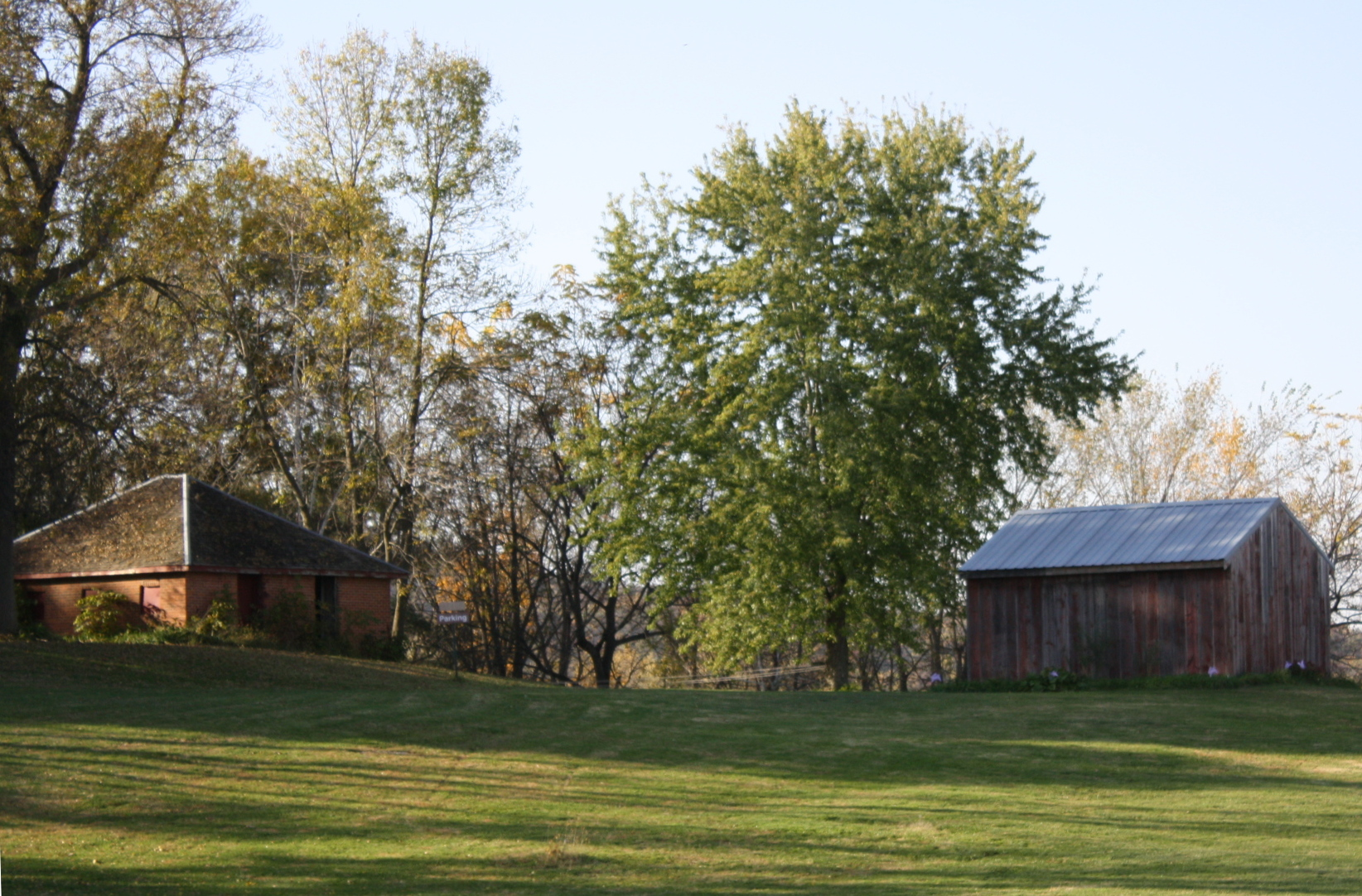
Barn (right) and icehouse (left)

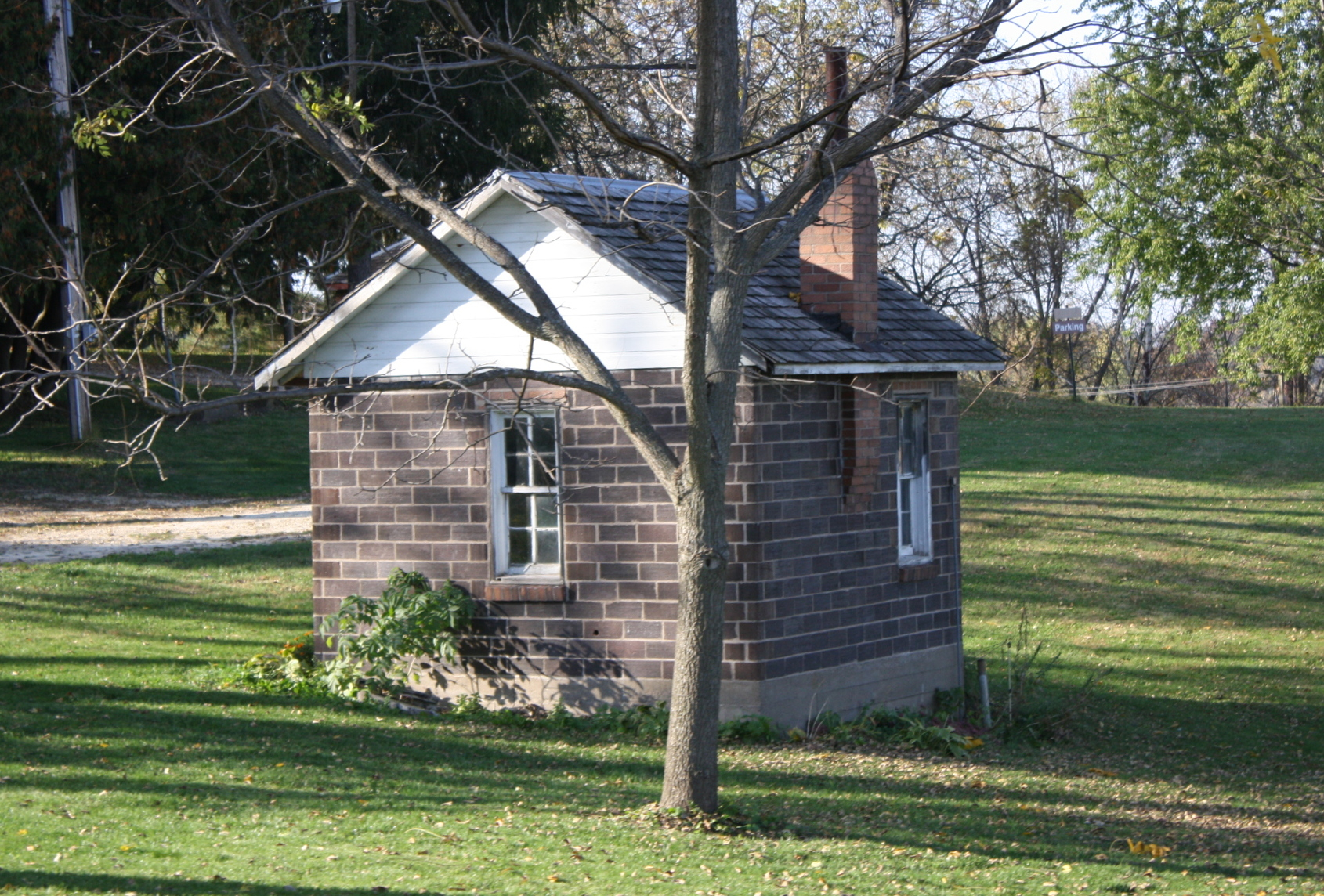
