= Alice Keith =

American music educator

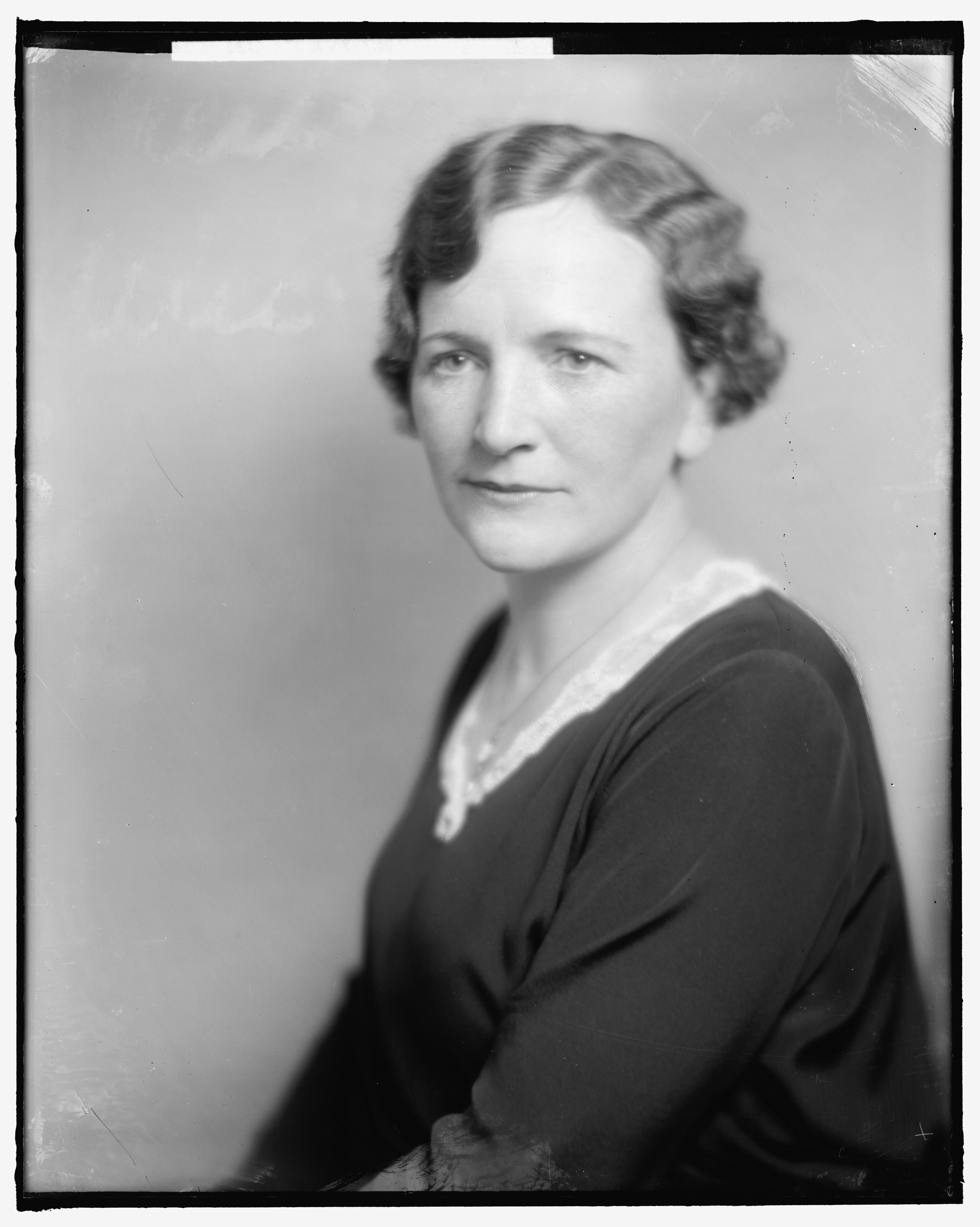
- Alice Keith, from the Library of Congress
- Born: Ruth Alice Keith; February 24, 1890; Galesville, Wisconsin, U.S.
- Died: December 24, 1962 (aged 72); Washington, D.C., U.S.
- Occupations: Pianist, music educator

Ruth Alice Keith (February 24, 1890 – December 24, 1962) was an American pianist and music educator. She was supervisor of music appreciation in the Cleveland Public Schools, founder of the National Academy of Broadcasting, and director of CBS's The American School of the Air.

== Early life and education ==
Keith was born in Galesville, Wisconsin, the daughter of Lincoln Sidney Keith and Cora Alice Cain Keith. Her parents were both born in Maine; her father was a school superintendent. She graduated from the University of Wisconsin in 1916, with a bachelor's degree in music. "There isn't a passing week in which I do not fall back on my college experience in drama, music, and writing for the college papers," she told an interviewer in 1937.

== Career ==
Keith was a pianist and a music educator. She taught in La Crosse and Madison as a young woman. In 1919, she directed community pageants in New England. She was assistant director of a large pageant in Chicago in 1921, to mark the 50th anniversary of the Great Chicago Fire. She was supervisor of music appreciation in the Cleveland Public Schools. She edited the Music Appreciation section of Music Supervisors Journal. She chaired the standing committee on music appreciation at the Music Educators National Conference in 1928.

Keith took particular interest in using radio as an educational medium. She worked with the Cleveland Orchestra to create radio programs for music appreciation classes in the 1920s, and worked with Walter Damrosch on a similar national program in New York. While the programs were aimed at schoolchildren, her radio broadcasts also found a large adult audience. She wrote articles for the Cleveland Plain Dealer, advising adults on how to purchase the music they heard, and what to expect in upcoming concerts.

Keith founded and presided over the National Academy of Broadcasting, was director of educational programs for RCA, and director of CBS's The American School of the Air. In the 1930s, she traveled in Europe studying adult education programs on radio. In 1944, she received the Theta Sigma Phi Headliner Award. She testified before a Congressional hearing on radio and television programs in 1952. In 1961, she was named head of the radio and television division of the Armed Services Writers League.

== Publications ==
- Listening in on the Masters (1926, with Arthur Shepherd)
- "Junior High School Music Appreciation" (1927)
- "Music as an Aid to the Social Studies" (1928)
- "Radio in the School" (1928)
- "Pacific Coast School Radio" (1928)
- "Radio Programs: Their Educational Value" (1931)
- "Radio and International Understanding" (1932)
- "Utilizing Radio in the Classroom" (1932)
- Just for Fun Play and Sing (1936)
- How to Speak and Write for Radio (1944)
- The Microphone and You

== Personal life ==
Keith died from cancer in 1962, at the age of 72, in Washington, D.C. Her papers, including recordings, correspondence, scrapbooks, and manuscripts, are held in the Wisconsin Historical Society.
