= Norris J. Kellman =

American politician

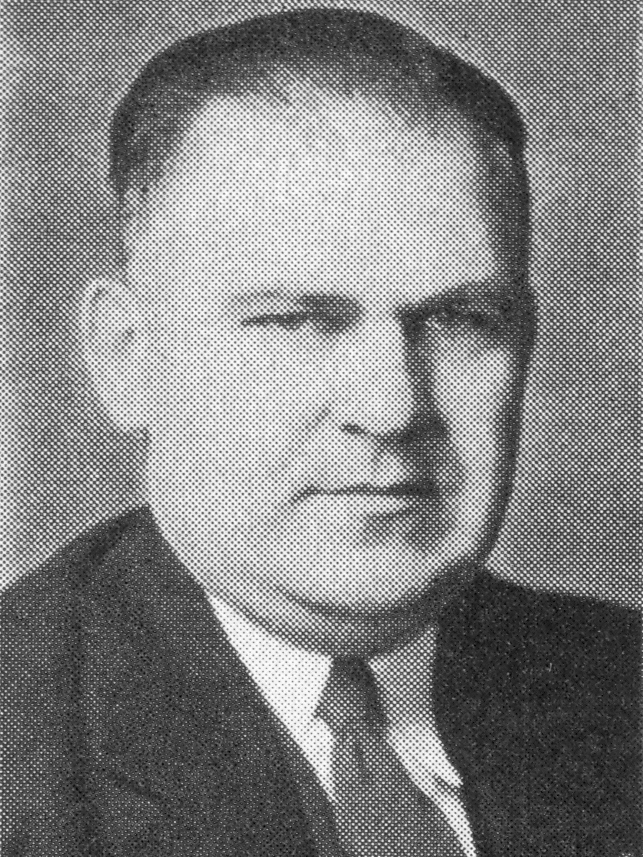
Kellman circa 1940

Norris J. Kellman (October 23, 1898 – August 10, 1993) was a politician in the State of Wisconsin.

He was born in Galesville, Wisconsin. His father, Frank A. Kellman, served in the Wisconsin State Assembly.

== Career ==
Kellman was a delegate to the 1940 and 1944 and served in the Wisconsin State Assembly from 1939 to 1940. He served in the United States Army during World War I. He went to University of Wisconsin–La Crosse. He was in the insurance business and was the assistant postmaster in Galesville. He also served on the Trempealeau County, Wisconsin Board of Supervisors. In 1941, he was the sergeant at arms for the Wisconsin State Assembly. He died on August 10, 1993.
