= Frank A. Kellman =

American politician

Frank Albin Kellman (April 24, 1869 – 1951) was a Swedish American immigrant and politician in the U.S. state of Wisconsin.

== Biography ==
Kellman resided in Galesville, Wisconsin. His son, Norris J. Kellman, would later serve in the Wisconsin State Assembly.

== Career ==
Kellman was born in Hillared, Sweden on April 24, 1869. He worked as a tin smith and then was in the hardware business. He also managed a creamery. Kellman served as mayor of Galesville and then served in the Wisconsin State Assembly from 1931 to 1934 as a Republican. He was a delegate to the 1936 Republican National Convention.
