= Downtown Historic District (Galesville, Wisconsin) =

Historic district in Wisconsin, United States

- U.S. National Register of Historic Places
- U.S. Historic district
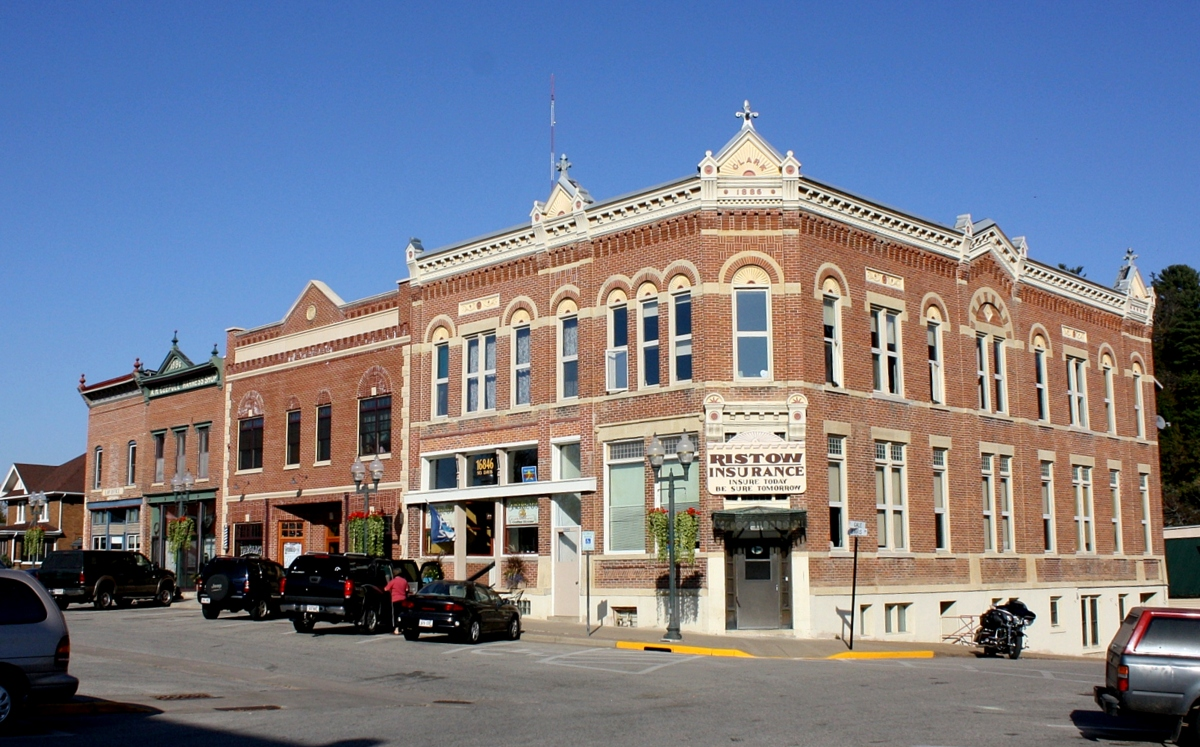

- Location within Wisconsin Location within the United States
- Location: Roughly Gale Ave., Main and Davis Sts., Galesville, Wisconsin
- Coordinates: 44°4′58″N 91°20′55″W
- Architect: Multiple
- Architectural style: Late 19th And 20th Century Revivals, Late Victorian
- MPS: Galesville MRA
- NRHP reference No.: 84003791
- Added to NRHP: September 18, 1984

Downtown Historic District in Galesville, Wisconsin is a historic district that was listed on the National Register of Historic Places in 1984.
