= Galesville, Wisconsin =

- City
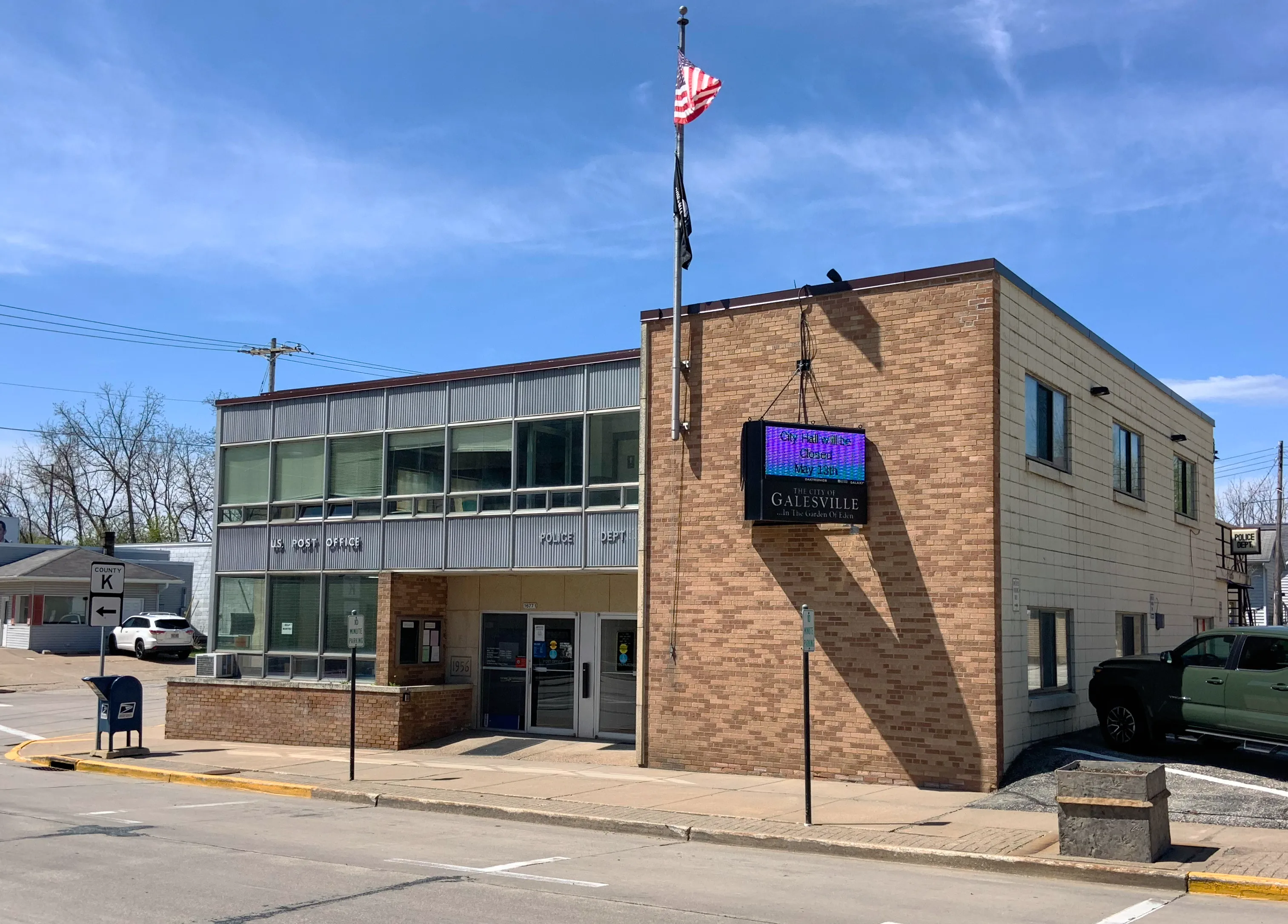
- Galesville City Hall, Police Department, and Post Office

- Location of Galesville in Trempealeau County, Wisconsin.

- Location within Wisconsin Location within the United States
- Coordinates: 44°5′1″N 91°21′13″W
- Country: United States
- State: Wisconsin
- County: Trempealeau
- Incorporated: January 26, 1942

Government
  - Type: Mayor-council
  - Mayor: Vince Howe

Area
  - Total: 1.45 sq mi (3.76 km^{2})
  - Land: 1.30 sq mi (3.37 km^{2})
  - Water: 0.15 sq mi (0.39 km^{2})
- Elevation: 728 ft (222 m)

Population (2020)
  - Total: 1,662
  - Density: 1,276/sq mi (492.7/km^{2})
- Time zone: UTC-6 (Central (CST))
  - Summer (DST): UTC-5 (CDT)
- Zip Code: 54630
- Area code: 608
- FIPS code: 55-28200
- GNIS feature ID: 1565380
- Website: www.cityofgalesvillewi.gov

Galesville is a city in Trempealeau County, Wisconsin, United States. The population was 1,662 at the 2020 census. A dam on Beaver Creek is located at Galesville, forming Lake Marinuka north of the city. The mayor is Vince Howe.

== History ==
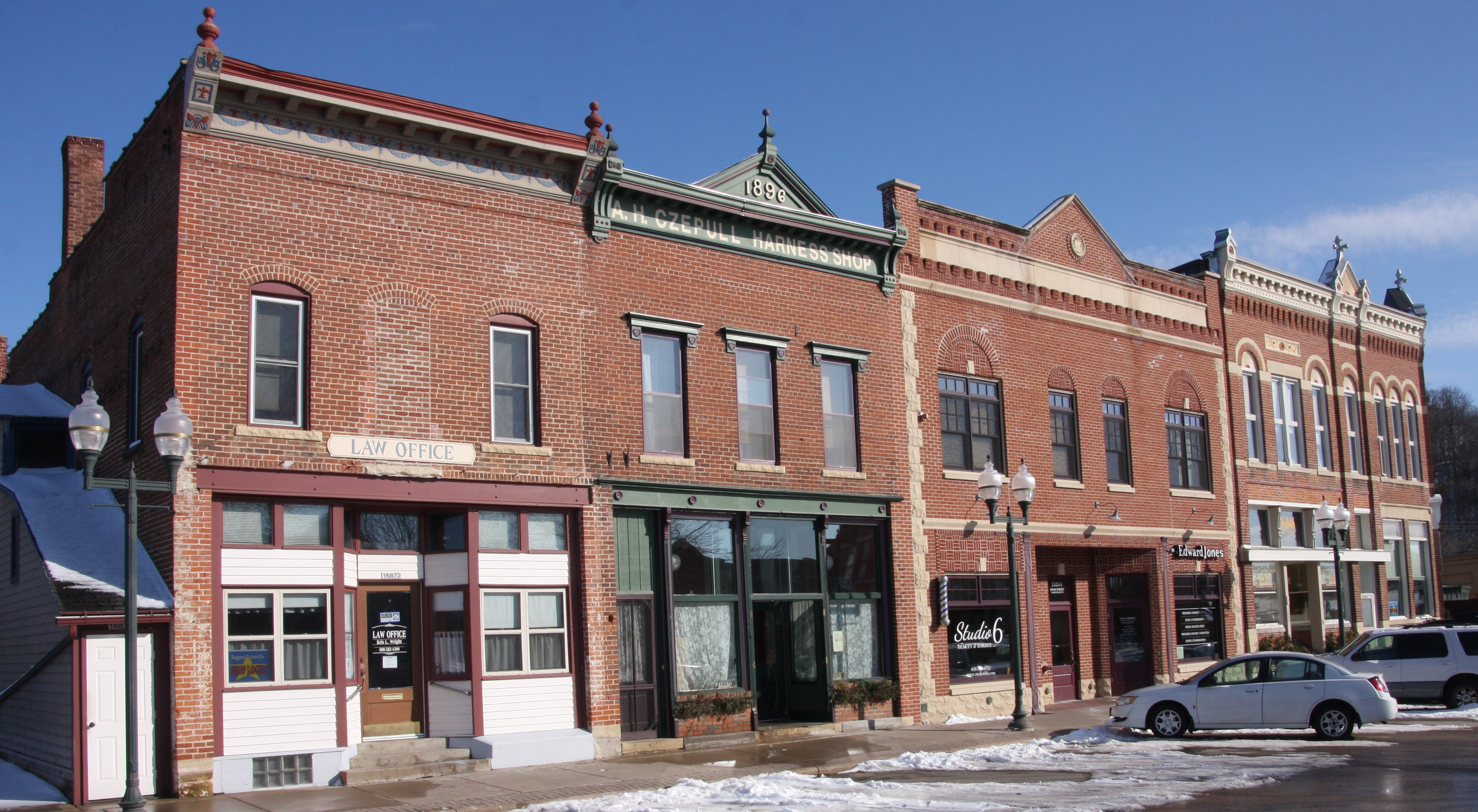
Downtown Historic District

Galesville is named for its founder, Judge George Gale, a native of Vermont. It was platted by Gale in 1854. It was formally incorporated as a village in 1887, and then as a city in 1942.

== Geography ==
According to the United States Census Bureau, the city has a total area of 1.45 square miles (3.76 km^{2}), of which 1.3 square miles (3.37 km^{2}) is land and 0.15 square miles (0.39 km^{2}) is water.

== Demographics ==
Historical population
| Census | Pop. | Note | %± |
|---|---|---|---|
| 1870 | 1,068 | | — |
| 1880 | 410 | | −61.6% |
| 1890 | 537 | | 31.0% |
| 1900 | 862 | | 60.5% |
| 1910 | 973 | | 12.9% |
| 1920 | 952 | | −2.2% |
| 1930 | 1,069 | | 12.3% |
| 1940 | 1,147 | | 7.3% |
| 1950 | 1,193 | | 4.0% |
| 1960 | 1,199 | | 0.5% |
| 1970 | 1,162 | | −3.1% |
| 1980 | 1,239 | | 6.6% |
| 1990 | 1,278 | | 3.1% |
| 2000 | 1,427 | | 11.7% |
| 2010 | 1,481 | | 3.8% |
| 2020 | 1,662 | | 12.2% |
U.S. Decennial Census

=== 2020 census ===
As of the census of 2020, the population was 1,662. The population density was 1,276.5 inhabitants per square mile (492.9/km^{2}). There were 794 housing units at an average density of 609.8 per square mile (235.4/km^{2}). The racial makeup of the city was 91.9% White, 1.9% Asian, 0.4% Black or African American, 0.1% Native American, 1.4% from other races, and 4.4% from two or more races. Ethnically, the population was 2.2% Hispanic or Latino of any race.

=== 2010 census ===
As of the census of 2010, there were 1,481 people, 635 households, and 388 families living in the city. The population density was 1,089.0 inhabitants per square mile (420.5/km^{2}). There were 694 housing units at an average density of 510.3 per square mile (197.0/km^{2}). The racial makeup of the city was 96.6% White, 0.1% African American, 0.2% Native American, 1.0% Asian, 0.4% from other races, and 1.6% from two or more races. Hispanic or Latino of any race were 1.2% of the population.

There were 635 households, of which 30.1% had children under the age of 18 living with them, 46.3% were married couples living together, 9.6% had a female householder with no husband present, 5.2% had a male householder with no wife present, and 38.9% were non-families. 33.7% of all households were made up of individuals, and 16.1% had someone living alone who was 65 years of age or older. The average household size was 2.25 and the average family size was 2.87.

The median age in the city was 41.6 years. 22.7% of residents were under the age of 18; 6.7% were between the ages of 18 and 24; 24.7% were from 25 to 44; 27.9% were from 45 to 64; and 18.1% were 65 years of age or older. The gender makeup of the city was 47.9% male and 52.1% female.

=== 2000 census ===
As of the census of 2000, there were 1,427 people, 606 households, and 355 families living in the city. The population density was 1,316.8 people per square mile (510.2/km^{2}). There were 648 housing units at an average density of 597.9 per square mile (231.7/km^{2}). The racial makeup of the city was 99.09% White, 0.14% African American, 0.07% Native American, 0.14% Asian, 0.07% Pacific Islander, 0.07% from other races, and 0.42% from two or more races. Hispanic or Latino of any race were 0.42% of the population.

There were 606 households, out of which 29.2% had children under the age of 18 living with them, 45.7% were married couples living together, 10.4% had a female householder with no husband present, and 41.3% were non-families. 36.1% of all households were made up of individuals, and 18.2% had someone living alone who was 65 years of age or older. The average household size was 2.26 and the average family size was 2.97.

In the city, the population was spread out, with 24.5% under the age of 18, 8.2% from 18 to 24, 25.5% from 25 to 44, 22.3% from 45 to 64, and 19.5% who were 65 years of age or older. The median age was 40 years. For every 100 females, there were 87.3 males. For every 100 females age 18 and over, there were 81.0 males.

The median income for a household in the city was $35,054, and the median income for a family was $45,333. Males had a median income of $29,453 versus $22,137 for females. The per capita income for the city was $18,245. About 6.0% of families and 9.6% of the population were below the poverty line, including 11.9% of those under age 18 and 14.3% of those age 65 or over.

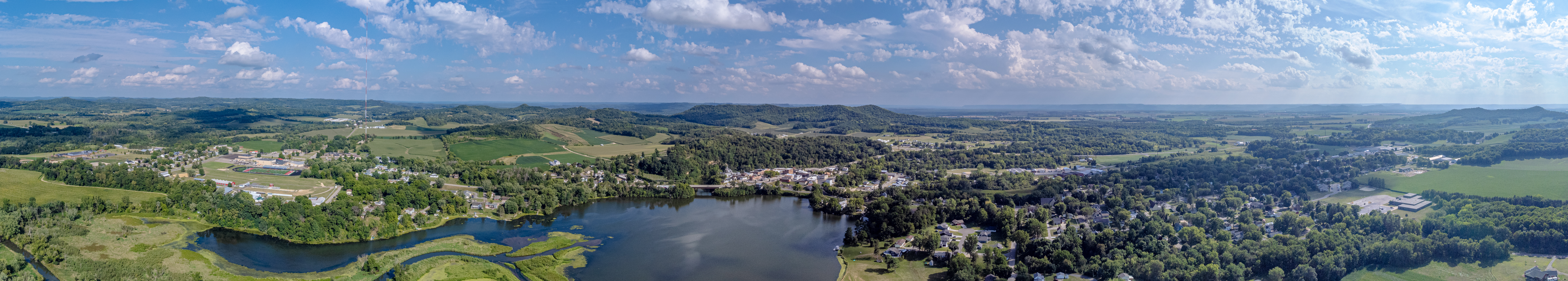
Galesville

== Education ==
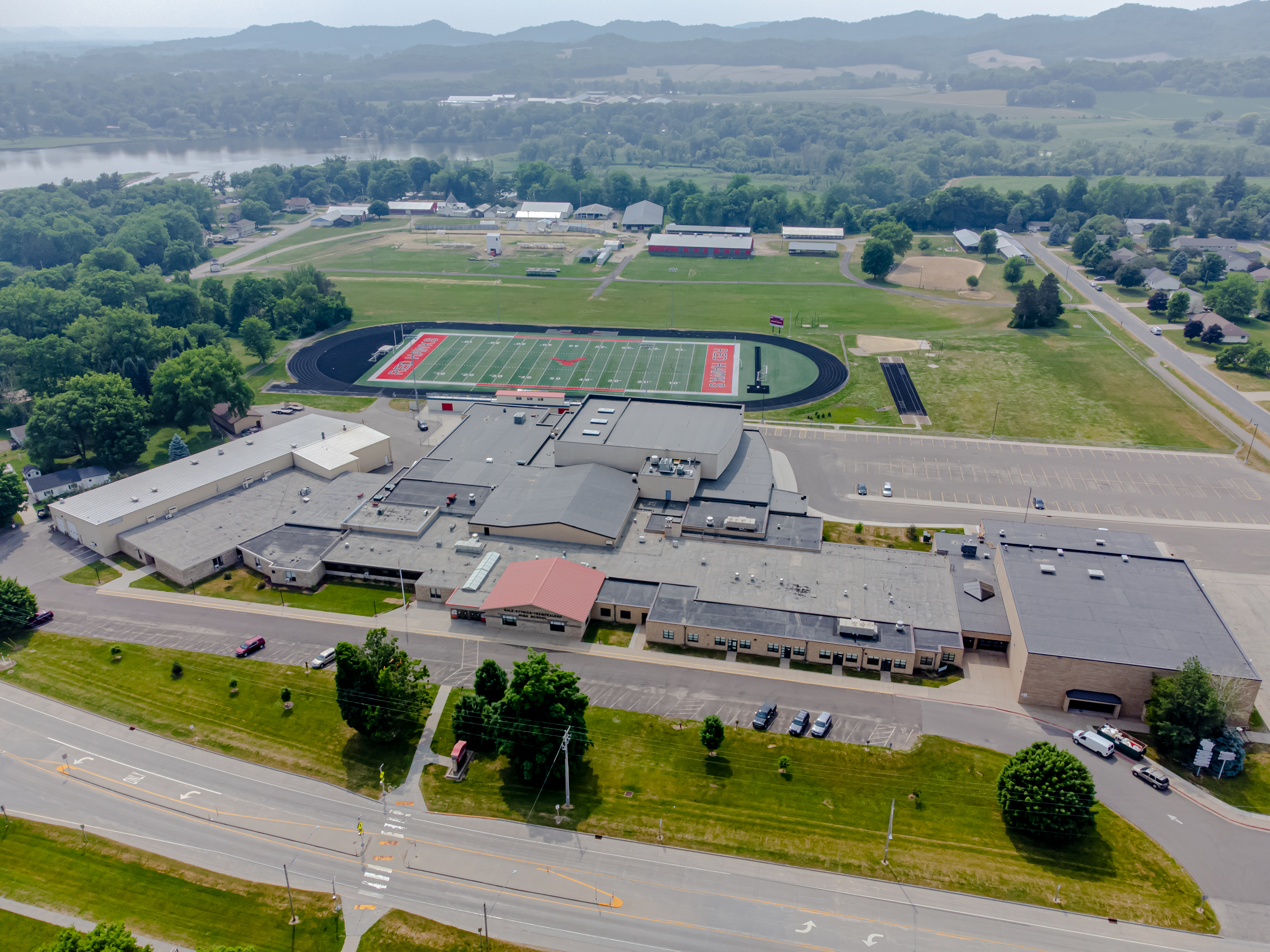
G.E.T. High School

The Gale-Ettrick-Trempealeau School District, also known as G-E-T, is a rural, public school district that serves the communities of Galesville and nearby Ettrick and Trempealeau.

The school district, based in Galesville, has three elementary schools (one in each town), one middle school in Galesville, and one high school (Gale-Ettrick-Trempealeau High School) in Galesville. The Red Hawk athletic teams compete in the Coulee Conference.

== Notable people ==
- Alexander A. Arnold, Speaker of the Wisconsin State Assembly
- Sam Brenegan, baseball player
- Eugene Clark, Wisconsin State Senator
- George Gale, jurist, legislator, and founder of Galesville and Trempealeau County
- Charles N. Herreid, Governor of South Dakota
- Suzanne Jeskewitz, Wisconsin State Representative
- Alice Keith, music educator, radio professional
- Frank A. Kellman, Wisconsin State Representative
- Norris J. Kellman, Wisconsin State Representative
- Elmer Petersen, sculptor of public art around La Crosse and creator of the World's Largest Buffalo
- Nicholas Ray, American film director (born Raymond Nicholas Kienzle)
- Albert Twesme, Wisconsin State Representative and jurist
- Guilford M. Wiley, Wisconsin State Representative
