= George H. Markham =

American politician

George Henry Markham (January 24, 1837 – May 6, 1920) was an American farmer and politician.

Born in Leeds, England, Markham emigrated to the United States in 1856 and settled in Independence, Wisconsin. Markham was a farmer. He served as town treasurer, town clerk, justice of the peace, and chairman of the town board. In 1879, Markham served in the Wisconsin State Assembly and was a Republican. He died at his home in Independence, Wisconsin.
