= Francis Xavier Pierz =

American-Slovenian writer and priest (1785–1880)

The Reverend Francis Xavier Pierz
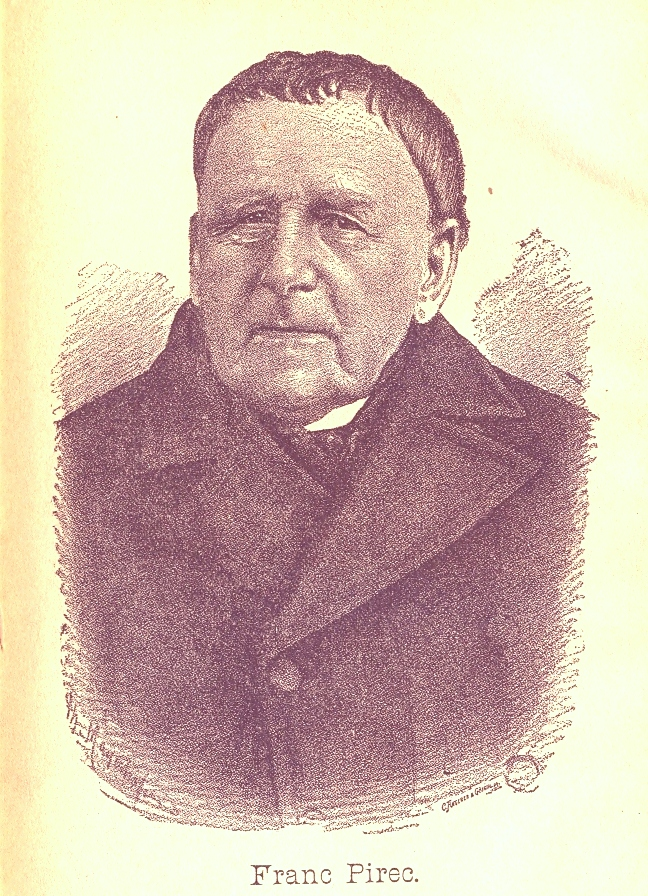
- Portrait of Francis Pierz from the book about his life written by Florentin Hrovat in 1887

Orders
- Ordination: March 13, 1813 by Bishop Anton Kavčič

Personal details
- Born: November 20, 1785 Godič, Kamnik, Slovenia
- Died: January 22, 1880 (aged 94) The Bishops Palace, Ljubljana Cathedral
- Buried: Saint Christopher's Cemetery, Ljubljana, Slovenia

Francis Xavier Pierz (Slovene: Franc Pirc or Franc Pirec; German: Franz Pierz) (November 20, 1785 – January 22, 1880) was a Slovenian-American Catholic priest and missionary to the Ottawa and Ojibwe Indians in present-day Michigan, Wisconsin, Ontario, and Minnesota. Because his letters convinced numerous Catholic German Americans to settle in Central Minnesota after the Treaty of Traverse des Sioux in 1851, Fr. Pierz is referred to as the "Father of the Diocese of Saint Cloud."

== Early life ==
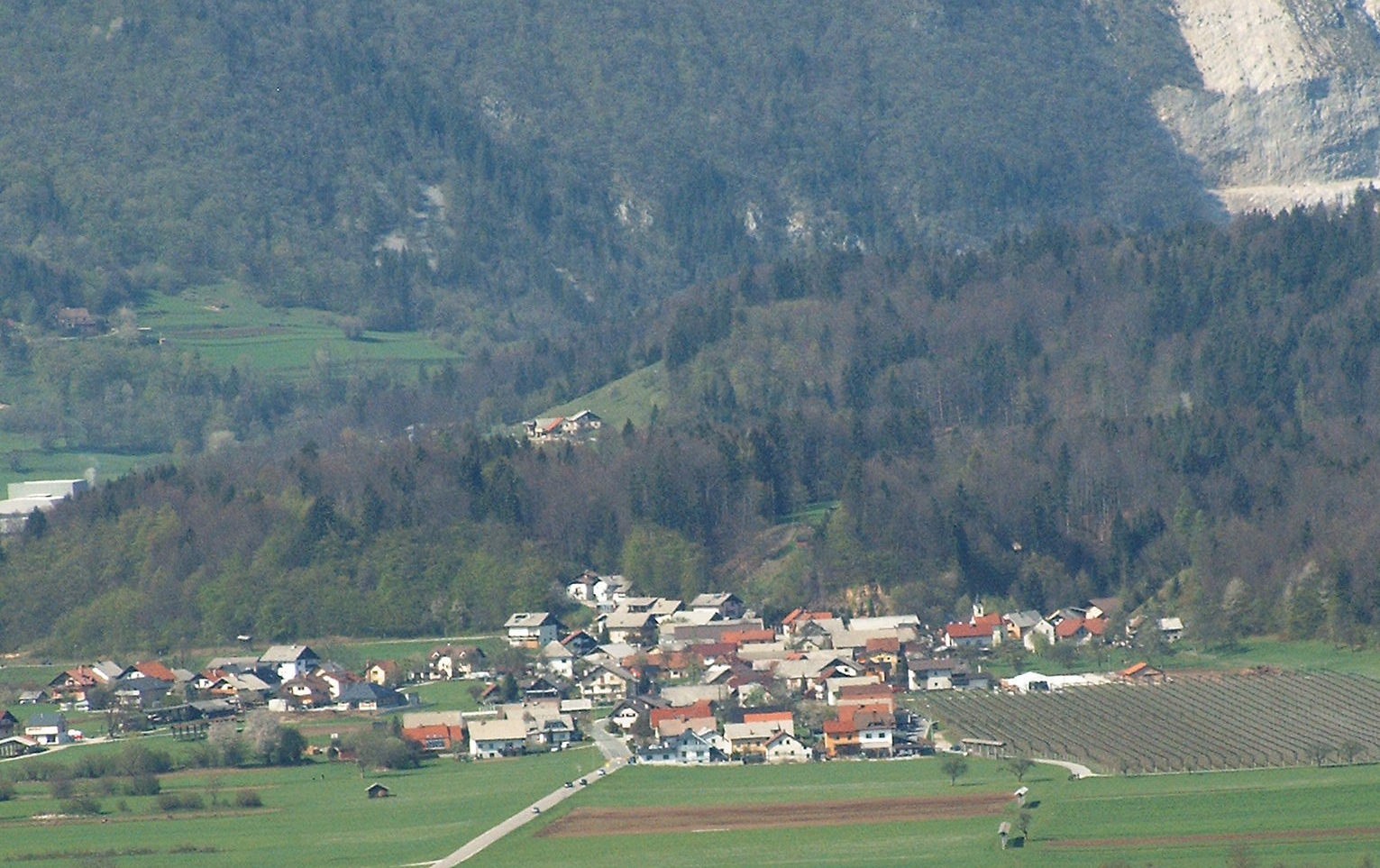
Father Pierz's birthplace of Godič, as it appears today.

Father Pierz was born into an ethnic Slovene peasant family in Godič, near the town of Kamnik in the Hapsburg-ruled Duchy of Carniola within the Austrian Empire (now Slovenia). On November 20, 1785, he was baptized as Franz Xav. Pierz. Despite the coercive Germanisation campaign by Emperor Joseph II, Francis Pierz was raised and educated bilingually. He became literate and fluent enough in both the vernacular Slovene language and in Standard Austro-German to later compose Christian poetry in both languages. He entered the major seminary of Ljubljana in the fall of 1810 and was ordained at Ljubljana Cathedral on March 13, 1813, by Bishop Anton Kavčič. Two of his brothers also became priests.

After seven years as assistant pastor for the Catholic Church in Slovenia of the mountain parishes of Kranjska Gora and Fusine in Valromana (Bela Peč, in Slovene), he was appointed parish priest of the villages of Peče and Podbrezje. In later years, all of his former parishes would become sources of Slovene immigrants and pioneer settlers of Central Minnesota.

After years of attempting to improve farming methods among the poor farmers of his parish, he published the book Kranjski Vertnar (The Carniolan Gardener) in 1830. His efforts led to his being awarded a medal of honor by the Carniolan Agricultural Society in 1842.

== Missionary ==
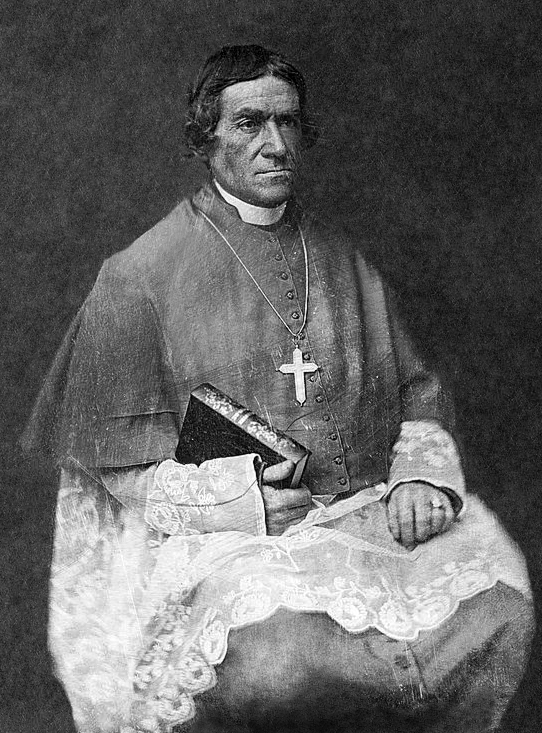
Bishop Frederic Baraga in his episcopal choir dress, holding his Dictionary of the Otchipwe Language. Photograph taken by Mathew Brady.

In 1835, Pierz departed for the missions of the United States after years of being inspired by the published letters of the Slovenian missionary known as, "The Snowshoe Priest", and future Bishop of Marquette, Father Frederic Baraga, who worked in present-day Upper Peninsula of Michigan and Wisconsin.

Following a particularly difficult and terrifying Atlantic Ocean crossing that he later versified in the poem ''Pesmi od svojega popotovanja, Fr. Pierz arrived in the Diocese of Detroit on September 16, where he presented his credentials to Bishop Frederick Rese. As Lake Superior had already frozen over, Father Pierz was prevented from immediately joining Father Baraga in Wisconsin and was assigned to the Ottawa of L'Arbre Croche, in what is now Little Traverse Bay Reservation in Michigan.

With the assistance of a Catholic Odawa Chief known as Sharp Knife, Fr. Pierz was very successful at making converts, even though the Ottawa dialect of the Ojibwe language was a terrible struggle for him to learn.

One of Fr. Pierz's particularly devout converts was a 15-year old Odawa girl who took the Baptismal name of Marie and who died soon after entering the Church, but in whose sanctity Fr. Pierz firmly believed and upon whose intercession he later strongly relied. Fr. Pierz also composed a long work of narrative Slovenian poetry about Marie's life and death, which he titled Pesmi od ajdovske deklice ("The Song of the Indian Girl").

Fr. Pierz later wrote of Marie, "Never did I know a more pious soul; never did I witness a more beautiful death than that of this pure young lady... Her blessed death accomplished much good in my mission, confirmed the faithful in piety, and brought about the conversion of many pagans. Henceforth, her parents lived very pious lives and zealously practiced their religion, but soon followed their daughter in death. Her father always wore the rosary around his neck, visited pagan lodges, spoke amid many tears of the mercies of God regarding his own conversion and of the life of his blessed daughter, who thrice was granted the happiness of a vision of her transfigured Savior, and brought to me a number of Indians eager to learn the Christian religion."

In the summer of 1836, Bishop Rese transferred Pierz to the mission of Sault Ste. Marie, where Father Pierz fought to keep the struggling mission operating. He also sailed to other missions around the shores of Lake Superior, where he served Catholics among the Ottawa and Ojibwa, who spoke Algonquian languages.

Even though Christian hymn-singing was a new addition to Ojibwe culture, Fr. Pierz learned while travelling with Ojibwe Catholics through an 1838 Lake Superior gale that it had been enthusiastically embraced. He later wrote, "We contended with powerful waves, and we slipped up and down the storm billows as if over the roof of a long city. The ice cold water dashed above our heads in the front of our bodies from neck to heel. A European unaccustomed to such dangers would have cried with fright; my Indians sang joyous spiritual songs with good courage."

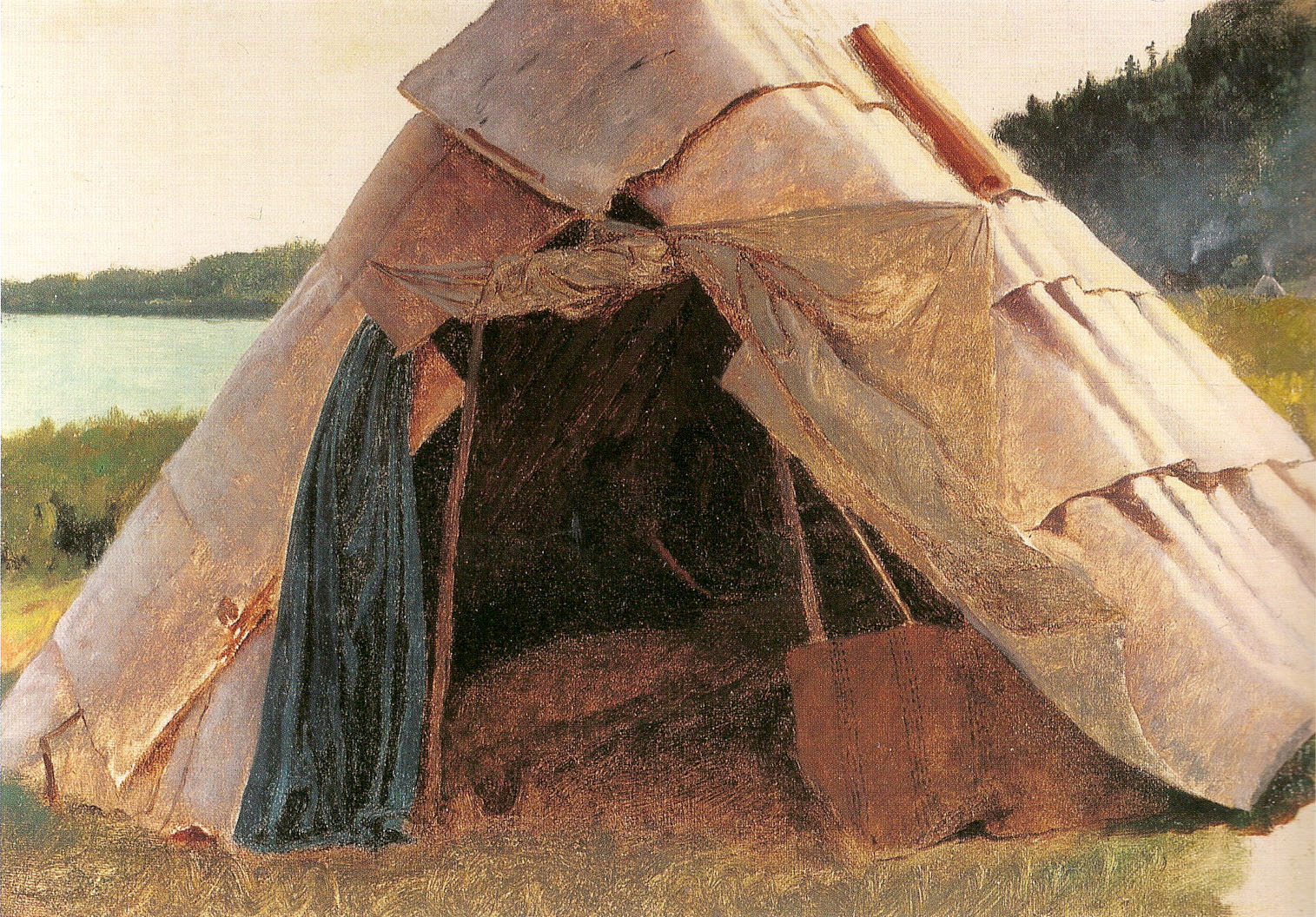
Ojibwe Wigwam at Grand Portage, painted by Eastman Johnson in 1857

On June 28, 1838, he reached Father Baraga at La Pointe, Wisconsin. After a friendly visit, Fr. Baraga persuaded Father Pierz to re-establish the mission at Grand Portage, Minnesota (now the Grand Portage Indian Reservation). The formerly great fur trading depot had declined with the removal of the North West Company's inland headquarters north to Fort William in 1803. The Ojibwa Indians living there had turned to commercial fishing on Lake Superior and selling their catches for a considerable profit to the American Fur Company. Pierre Picotte, a Métis who worked as an agent for the company, had been instructing local Ojibwe in the Catechism and preparing them to join the Catholic Church. Father Pierz's letters describe how impressed he was by the zealous Ojibwa embrace of Catholicism, particularly by teenaged boys and young men, which Fr. Pierz described as the complete opposite of what he was accustomed to as a priest in Europe. They also reveal that, unlike local Protestant missionaries, Fr. Pierz did not believe in the then commonly held idea that, "Indians must be civilized before they can be Christianized."

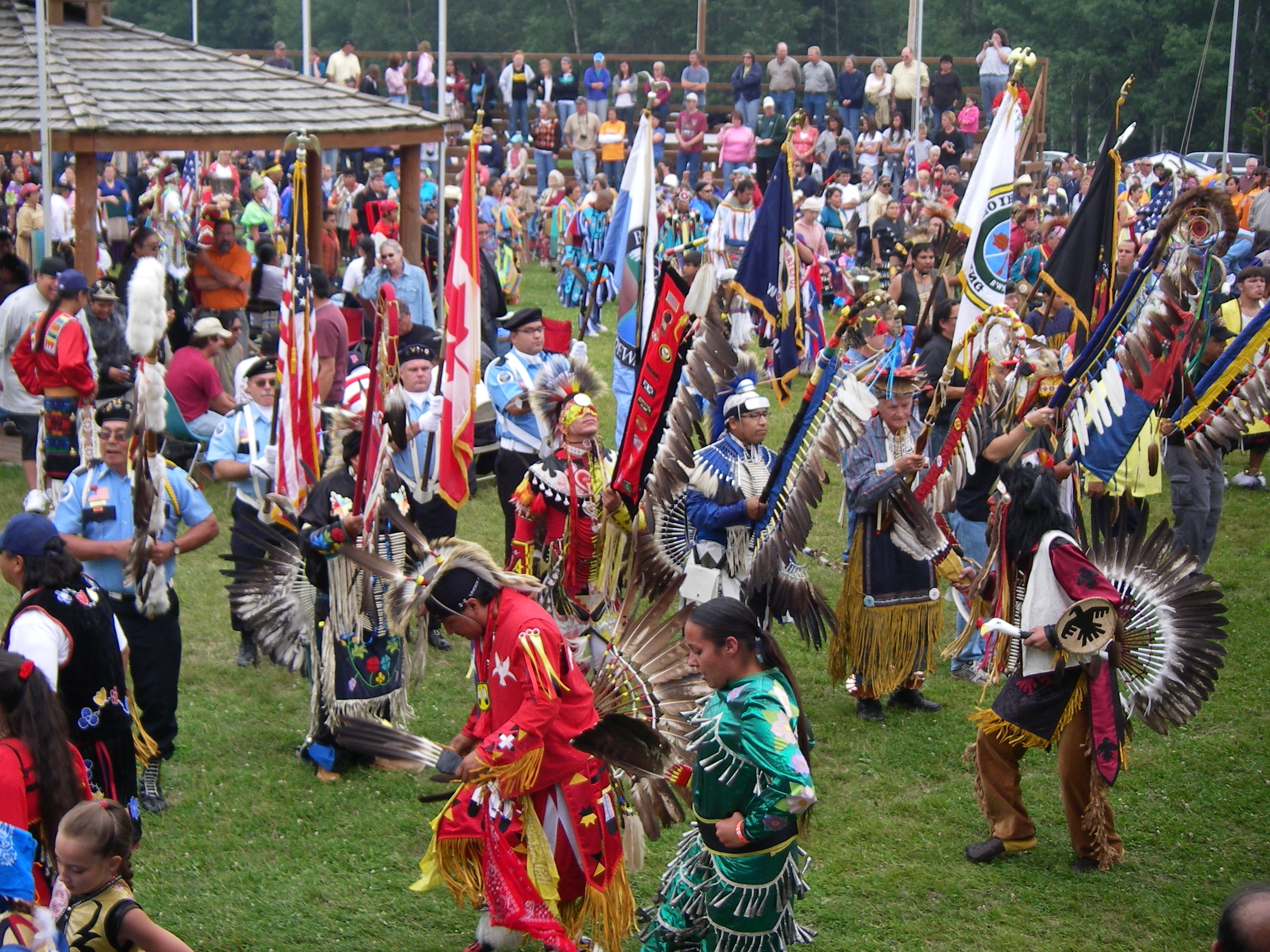
Lake Superior Ojibwe Powwow at Grand Portage, 2009.

Fr. Pierz preached and taught in the Ojibwe language and trained the Grand Portage parish choir to sing hymns in Ojibwe, almost certainly that he learned from Bishop Baraga's hymnal, as well.

According to historian Fr. Robert Voigt, "Father Pierz was also the doctor for the Indians. He had his own homeopathic methods. When a smallpox epidemic broke out, and no regular doctor was available, the missionary sent for vaccine and personally administered it to some 900 individuals, Christians and Pagans. This he broke down prejudice and prepared the way for future conversions."

Also at Grand Portage, Pierz arranged for the clearing of a plot of farmland and orchard which, in keeping with Ojibwe ways, was owned and worked in common. He helped negotiate the sale of their surplus produce to nearby mining settlements. He founded a Catholic school for the children of the mission. His letters provide a vivid glimpse into daily life on the mission. The Catholic missions at Fort William, Ontario and Isle Royale were also under his jurisdiction. In October 1839, the bishop ordered Pierz to move to take over the missions at Harbor Springs, Michigan (now Little Traverse Bay Bands of Odawa Indians). He remained there for 12 years.

== Minnesota ==
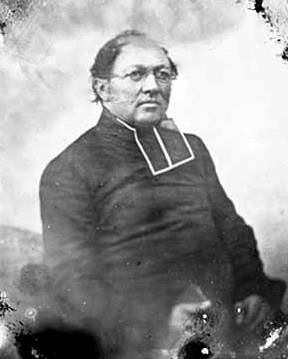
Bishop Joseph Crétin, c.1850.

In Spring 1852, after a series of disputes with his bishop, Pierz secured a release from the Diocese of Detroit. He was recruited for the newly organized Diocese of Saint Paul, where Bishop Joseph Crétin urgently needed priests to serve his vast territory.

Father Pierz was assigned a mission field, comprising the whole of Minnesota Territory north of the Twin Cities. He established his headquarters in the village of Crow Wing. Traveling on foot between his missions, Pierz carried on his back all that was necessary for saying Mass.

The first Mass in the St. Cloud area was offered by Fr. Francis de Vivaldi, a missionary to the Winnebago reservation in Long Prairie, Minnesota, in 1851. The Mass took place inside a log cabin, located midway between Sauk Rapids and the ghost town of Watab and 3/4 miles inland from the Mississippi River, and owned by James Keough, a former merchant seaman from County Wexford, Ireland.

Keough later recalled, "The congregation present was made up of Irish and French Canadians. The altar was prepared by a half-breed (sic) lady, the wife of a Canadian Frenchman. I am the owner of the table used as an altar on that occasion. Some time after this Father Pierz came among us, and subsequently built the first Catholic church at Sauk Rapids."

During a later interview, Father Aloysius was almost certainly referring to Mrs. James Keough (née Katherine Brady of Spanish Point, County Clare), when he said, "Father Pierz changed his clothes thoroughly once a year. And that was when he reached Sauk Rapids, where an Irish lady always had a new clean clothes laid out for him which she bought or made and she would quite force him to change."

With his bishop unable to finance his work, Father Pierz had to rely on the Ludwig-Missionsverein and the Leopoldinen-Stiftung for desperately needed funds. Both European organizations had been formed to support Catholic missionaries abroad and were mainly funded by the Bavarian House of Wittelsbach and the Austro-Hungarian House of Habsburg.

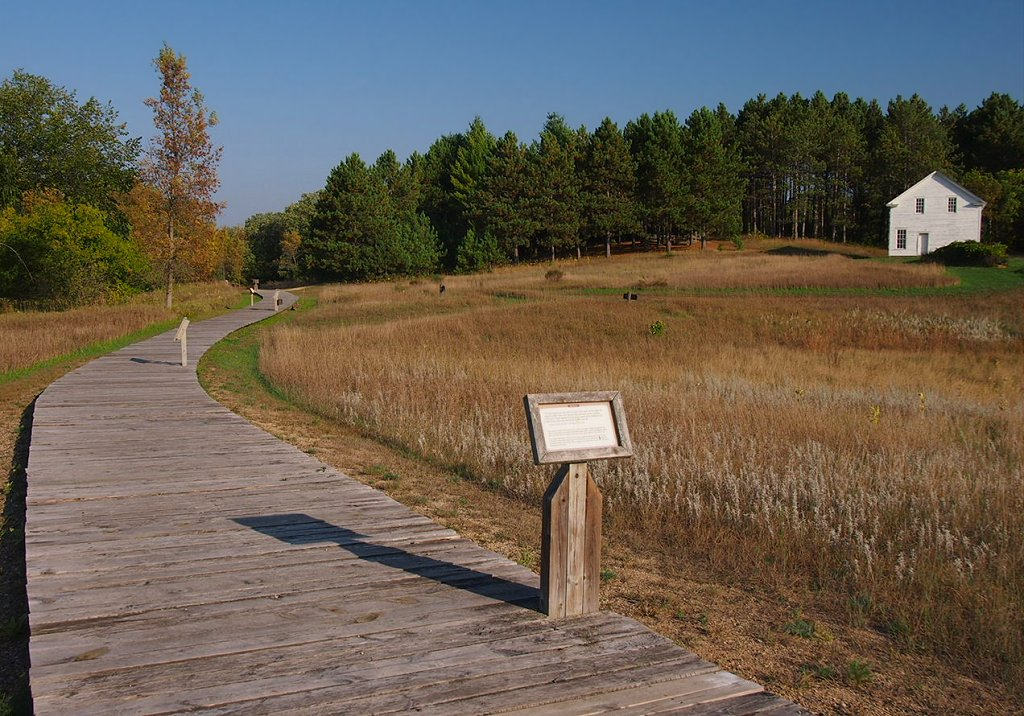
The townsite of Old Crow Wing, Minnesota, as it appears today.

Meanwhile, the Ojibwa dubbed Fr. Pierz, "Old Man, Black Gown." Viewing him as a man of great spiritual power, they occasionally stole his socks to use as a folk remedy against rheumatism. As he had previously done at Grand Portage, Fr. Pierz continued to both preach and to teach his converts hymns in the Ojibwe language.

During an interview at White Earth during the 1920s, Mrs. Isabel (née Vanoss) Belcourt, formerly of Otter Tail Lake, recalled, "They fixed him a good bed, but he always slept on the floor wrapped in a blanket. He would pray all night instead of sleeping. At Ottertail, he held school teaching the children catechism, in the Indian language. In his sermons [in] Indian, he would often break out with 'Ya! Ya! Ya!' Always spoke in a very earnest, fatherly way. Once during a famous Sioux scare, the Sioux broke into Fr. Pierz's house and took his vestments and cassock. Later a Sioux Chief was seen decked out in these vestments."

John Fairbanks, also of White Earth, later recalled, "Indians had great respect for him. He had a holy picture or medal for anyone who did anything for him, saying, 'Now, wear and don't lose it my little child and keep this holy picture'. He carried rosaries constantly. He was great to joke and made constant fun and good cheer. On his long trips if he had nothing to eat, it was alright, and if he had it it was alright, too. It took a good singer to outbeat him in singing the Chippewa hymns which he constantly taught the Indians. He always had medicine of all sorts, especially round pills in vials or glass bottles and gave precise prescriptions."

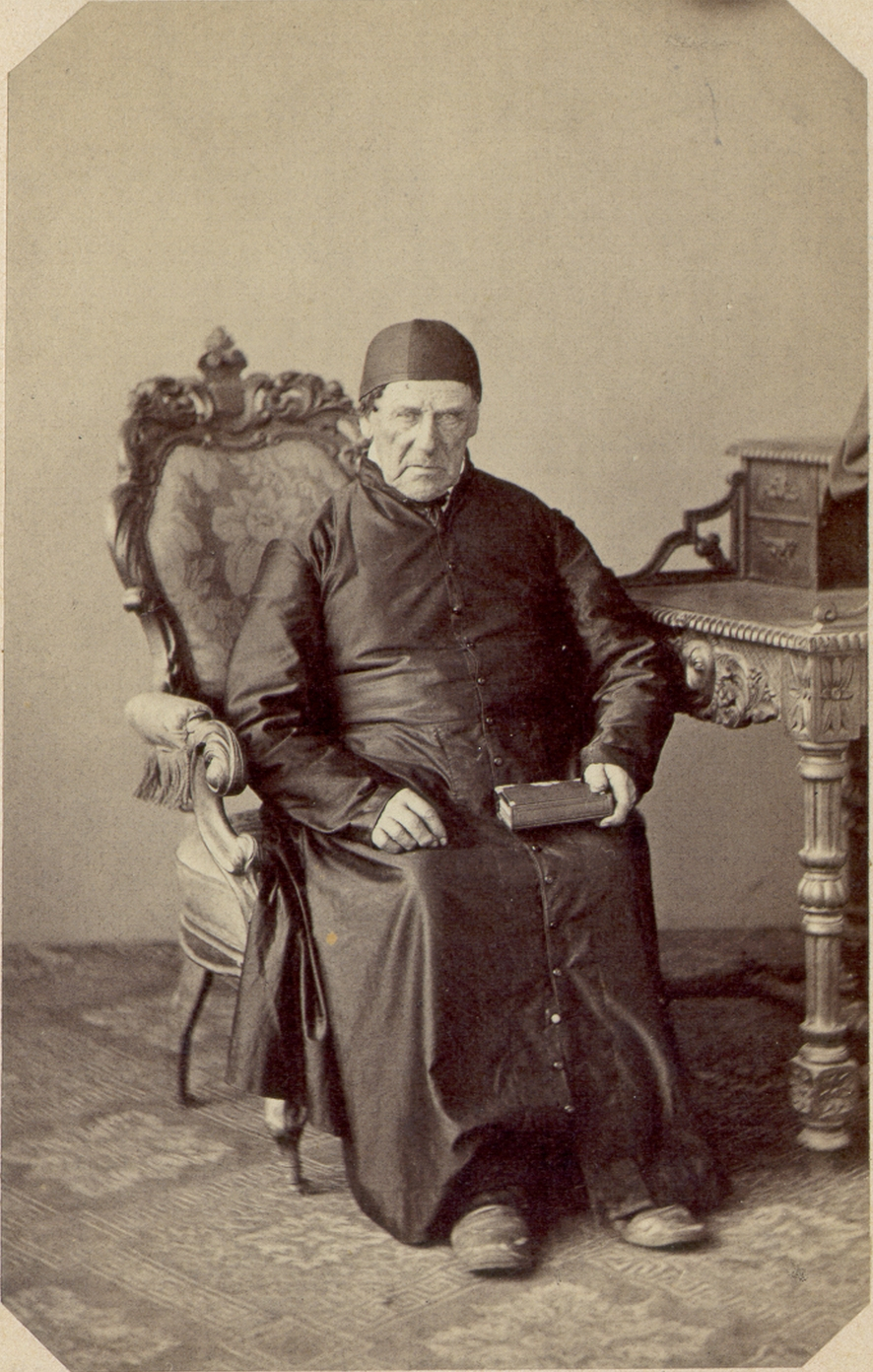
Francis Xavier Pierz, 1864

After the United States Federal Government signed the Treaty of Traverse des Sioux with the Dakota people in 1851, it declared much of southern and central Minnesota open to White settlement.

The first Catholics to settle in what is now Stearns County were former Sauk Rapids pioneers James and Katherine Keough, who built a farmhouse and homestead on the modern site of the St. Cloud VA. James Keough later recalled, "About the time that the Treaty with the Sioux Indians was ratified, I asked Father Pierz to come across the Mississippi River and see what a fine country was there. He came across and was so delighted that he wrote about it in all directions... Father Pierz then came over to my house and celebrated Mass, and from that time visited us monthly. He usually stayed with us from Saturday till Monday, celebrating Mass on Sunday."

Other locations around St Cloud where Mass was offered by Fr. Pierz before the first Catholic church was built on the downtown site of the future St Cloud Federal Building included the John Schwartz home at 10 North 15th Avenue and the Rothkopp homestead along and overlooking the Beaver Islands Trail, which later became the first location of St. John's Abbey and later of the St. Cloud Children's Home. Early Stearns County German settlers, however, dubbed the former Rothkopp claim (German: der Morgenstern), meaning "The Morning Star", and (German: das Priester Wald), meaning, "The Priests' Forest."

Noticing many Protestant Yankee settlers from the Northern Tier, Father Pierz tried at first to interest his fellow Slovenes to settle in the region, but with limited success.

Fr. Pierz had previously brought with him from Slovenia his 12-year-old nephew Joseph Notsch Jr., the son of his sister, Mrs. Apollonia Notsch. Joseph Notsch would accompany him on his trips, assist by serving Mass, and when necessary do the cooking. In 1854, Notsch's parents and siblings became the first Slovenian family to emigrate to the New World, and carried with them an altarpiece for Fr. Pierz which had been painted by Matevž Langus. The Notsch family was accused at the time of foolishness by Janez Bleiweis, the highly influential editor of the newspaper Novice. Apollonia Notsch, however, later wrote a famous letter in the history of the Slovenian diaspora from her family's homestead in St. Joseph, Minnesota, describing the family's passage on the immigrant ship, her impressions of frontier life, and expressed joy for having emigrated to America. The letter was also published by Janez Bleiweis in Novice, and convinced other Slovenes to follow the Notsch family's lead.

Fr. Pierz also decided to promote the territory among German-American Catholics. Writing in newspapers such as Der Wahrheitsfreund (The Friend of Truth), based in Cincinnati, Ohio, he wrote glowing descriptions of Minnesota's climate, its soil, and its large tracts of free land for homesteaders.

In one such letter, Fr. Pierz wrote, "Make haste, dear Germans, to precede all others and pick the best places that are to be found in America for your settlement. You will certainly find the best land, the healthiest region, and all freedom, and you will be provided for spiritually."

In a letter to Der Wahrheitsfreund on 1 March 1854, Fr. Pierz urged, "Germans who live in overpopulated cities and are become too Anglicized in the employ of Americans and Protestants", to migrate as homesteaders to the Minnesota Territory. He continued, "I do wish that the choicest pieces of land in this delightful Territory would become the property of thrifty Catholics who would make an earthly paradise of this Minnesota which Heaven has so richly blessed, and who would bear out the opinion that Germans prove to be the best farmers and the best Christians in America." He warned, however, "Do not bring with you any Freethinkers, Red Republicans, Atheists, or agitators."

According to historian Kathleen Neils Conzen, "Within weeks of the publication of his letter, scouts from separate German Catholic settlements in northeastern and north-central Illinois, southwestern and northwestern Indiana, northeastern, north-central, and southern Ohio, western Pennsylvania, eastern Wisconsin, and central Missouri had converged on the Sauk River Valley, and fifty pioneering families huddled in crude cabins that bitterly cold winter."

In May 1855, an even larger wave of German, Luxembourger, and Slovene settlers arrived, staking out claims throughout what are today Morrison, Benton, and Stearns counties.

Archbishop John Ireland later wrote of Fr. Pierz, "Wielding a facile pen, gifted with poetic fancy, skilled in description, he filled week after week the columns of German papers in America and Europe with vivid picturings of the region, beckoning thither all who craved for happy homes, who foresaw in the cultivation of the land prosperity for themselves and their children. At the call of Father Pirec (sic) there came crowds of settlers, sturdy sons of Rheinland, Westphalia, and Bavaria, until a new Germany arose in Stearns County -- a new Germany permeated to the core with that strong Catholic Faith and energy racy of the Catholic population of those historic provinces of olden Germany."

Unable to care for both the settlers and the Ojibwa, Father Pierz pleaded with Bishop Crétin to send more priests to assist him. The Bishop wrote in response to Abbot Boniface Wimmer of Saint Vincent Archabbey in Latrobe, Pennsylvania. On May 21, 1856, a party of five Benedictine priests from Pennsylvania arrived on a steamboat at Sauk Rapids, Minnesota. They founded Saint John's Abbey. Unable to be there to greet them, Father Pierz had left a letter for the party's leader, Father Demetrius de Marogna, by which he formally transferred his missions in and around Sauk Rapids to the jurisdiction of the Benedictine Order.

The following year, he was instrumental in bringing Mother Benedicta Riepp and a group of Benedictine nuns from the Abbey founded by Saint Walpurga in Eichstätt, Kingdom of Bavaria, to educate the many children of the German immigrants in Central Minnesota. They founded St. Benedict's Convent, College, and Monastery at St. Joseph.

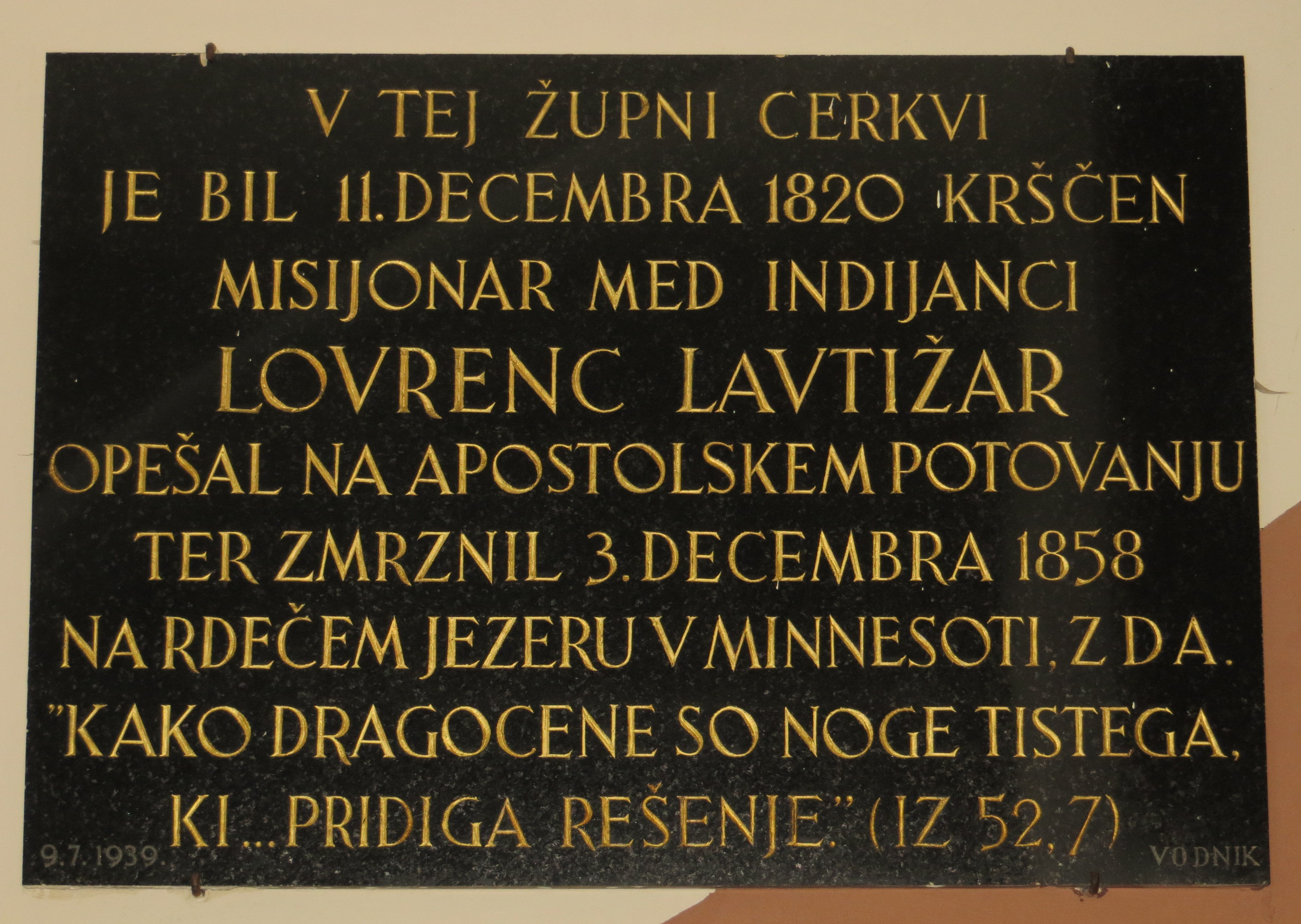
A Plaque commemorating Fr. Lavtižar inside Assumption Church, Kranjska Gora, Slovenia.

In 1857, Fr. Pierz also invited fellow Slovenian missionary Fr. Lovrenc Lavtižar to Minnesota, where he was assigned to the Red Lake Indian Reservation. During the night of December 3, 1858, Fr. Lavtižar froze to death during a blizzard while returning across the ice of Red Lake after giving the Last Rites to a dying Ojibwe Catholic. Fr. Pierz subsequently eulogized his deceased fellow missionary in a work of Slovenian poetry, which he titled Spomenik Lovrencu Lavtižaru, bivšemu misijonarju v severni Ameriki.

== 1862 peacemaker ==
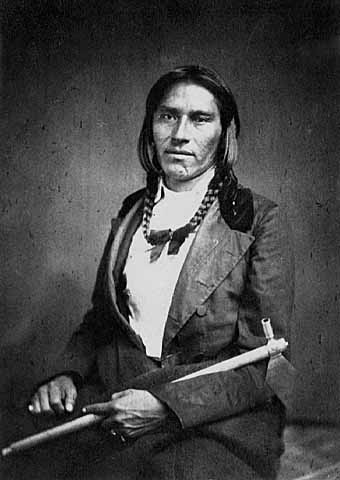
An 1858 Portrait of Chief Hole in the Day.

At the outbreak of the American Civil War in 1861, some Ojibwe had volunteered to serve in the Union Army. During an interview on White Earth in the 1920s, John Fairbanks recalled, "The Indian soldiers at Crow Wing, before leaving for the Civil War, marched to Father Pierz in solemn file. He blessed them and told them that they would come back safe and so they all did."

During the Dakota War of 1862, Chief Hole in the Day of the Mississippi Band spoke out in favor of the Ojibwe joining forces with their traditional enemies, Chief Little Crow and the Dakota people, to drive all American and European immigrants from Minnesota. His threats to attack and take control of Fort Ripley caused a great amount of terror at the fort.

To further convince other Minnesota Ojibwe to join his uprising, Chief Hole in the Day spread a false rumor that the Union Army would soon be conscripting Ojibwe men to fight in the American Civil War. Largely in reaction to this rumor and warlike coaxing by Hole in the Day, a group from the Leech Lake Ojibwe burned down the Indian Agency in Walker, Minnesota, took prisoners, and marched to Crow Wing.

The other Ojibwe chiefs, however, did not agree with the idea of going to war against the United States Federal Government and, with many Ojibwe warriors, moved into Fort Ripley to help defend the fort against a possible attack from forces incited by Hole in the Day.

When the news of the attempted uprising reached him, Fr. Pierz was visiting St. Cloud, Minnesota and staying with Mother Benedicta Riepp and the Benedictine Sisters. St. Cloud and the surrounding countryside panicked and many young men volunteered for military service, only to be immediately withdrawn for military operations against the Dakota, which left St. Cloud defenseless. In response to an urgent plea from the Commanding Officer at Fort Ripley, Fr. Pierz also left St. Cloud immediately, but ran towards the potential war zone rather than away from it. Upon reaching the war zone, Fr. Pierz approached Chief Hole in the Day's camp at great personal risk. After a considerable time arguing that he must see the Chief with the Ojibwe guards, who were under strict orders to shoot anyone, whether Ojibwe or White, who tried to cross the inner line and enter Hole in the Day's war camp, an older warrior, who was a Catholic convert, approached and said, "We have orders to allow no man to go beyond this line; now the black-robe says he must see the chiefs. There is no way of evading orders; we must carry the black-robe into the council. He thus does not go, but is carried, and that has not been forbidden."

According to historian Fr. Robert J. Voigt, Fr. Pierz's decades of missionary work had taught him about the great importance of family connections within Odawa and Ojibwe culture, as well as the very deep love that parents feel for their children. With this in mind, Fr Pierz presented a bag of tobacco as a sign that he came in peace. Fr Pierz then spoke to Hole in the Day and his followers for one half hour in the Ojibwe language about what he termed the foolishness of their intentions. He explained that there was already widespread outrage over the many settlers slain by the Dakota throughout the Minnesota River valley, that the United States military was too numerous and too powerful for them to defeat, and what is now called genocide could very easily be unleashed against the whole Ojibwe people, including their wives and their children. He ended by pleading with the Chief to negotiate peace with honor before it was too late.

Even though all other peace-making efforts had failed, Chief Hole in the Day immediately replied that he would call off the uprising. He then journeyed with Fr. Pierz to Crow Wing and signed a peace agreement with the United States Federal Government.

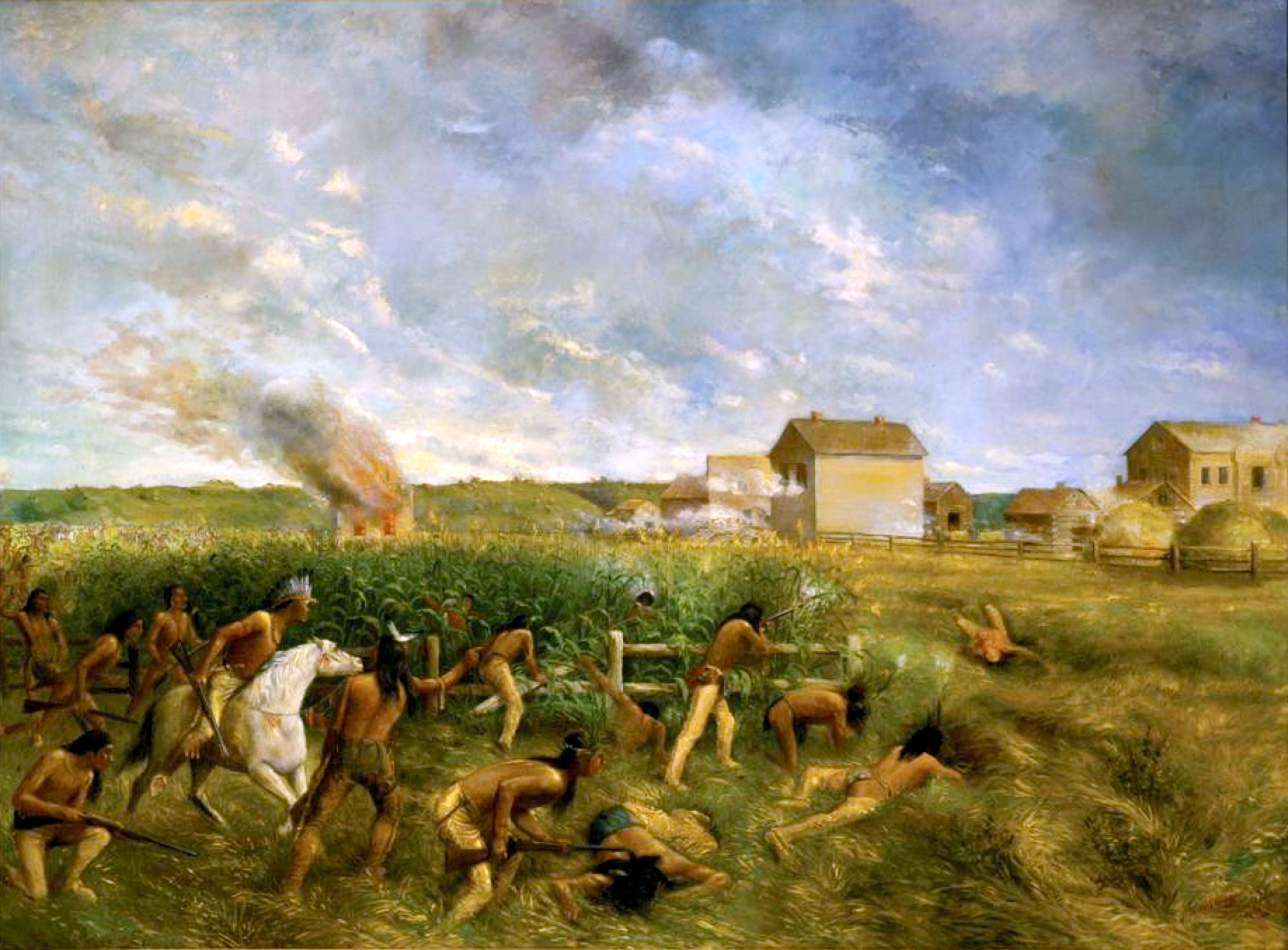
Anton Gag's 1904 painting "Attack on New Ulm"

Despite these events, Fr. Pierz considered the resentments felt by the Ojibwe and Dakota to be perfectly understandable. For example, in a September 1862 letter, Fr. Pierz expressed his thoughts about the recent destruction of New Ulm, Minnesota during two recent battles between local German-American settlers and the Dakota people. Fr. Pierz described a recent New Ulm festival and parade which were, from a Catholic perspective, a very deliberate and insulting mockery of Corpus Christi Eucharistic processions and the doctrine of the Real Presence by the anti-Christian and anti-theistic German-American Turners and Forty-Eighters who had founded and still dominated that settlement. Fr Pierz expressed a belief that the Dakota attack may have represented divine retribution for both the anti-Catholic festival parade and for what he considered the dishonorable behavior of local settlers' and corrupt Federal Indian Agents.

Ironically, the New Ulm Forty-Eighters' anti-Catholic procession may in reality have been motivated by fear over their increasing loss of social and political control. According to Kathleen Neils Conzen, "Thanks to the nature of its immigration, the church more than the union hall remained at the center of Minnesota's German community life. Even free-thinking New Ulm became by the end of the 19th century a Catholic stronghold overlooked by a Lutheran college on its bluffs."

== Later life ==
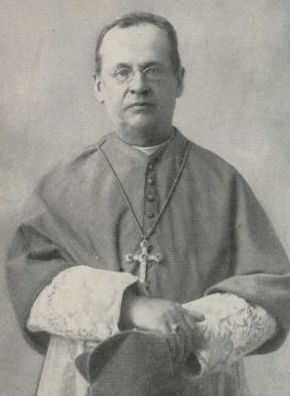
Bishop James Trobec.

In 1863, Father Pierz sailed for Europe to recruit additional priests for the Minnesota missions. Among those who returned with him were fellow Slovenian priests Joseph Francis Buh (for whom Buh Township, in Morrison County, Minnesota is named), Ignaz Tomazin, and James Trobec (the future Bishop of Saint Cloud).

According to Father Robert J. Voigt, "Father Pierz was loved by the priests and people alike. To give some examples: in 1865 Bishop Thomas Grace summoned all the priests of his jurisdiction (some 30) to Saint Paul for a retreat. At the end of the retreat the Bishop insisted that Father Pierz celebrate his Golden Jubilee as a priest. He did so by offering a Solemn High Mass in the Cathedral of Saint Paul. Afterwards a dinner was given in his honor."

Following the death of his former mentor, Bishop Frederic Baraga, on January 19, 1868, Fr. Pierz eulogized him in a work of Slovenian poetry, which he titled Pesem od misijonarja Baraga.

After the June 27, 1868 contract killing of Chief Hole in the Day in the Gull Lake road by twelve hired gunmen from the Pillager Band, his son Ignatius Hole in the Day, a convert to Roman Catholicism and graduate of St. John's University in Collegeville, requested that his father receive a Catholic burial. As the Chief had been seriously considering converting to Catholicism but had never actually been baptized, Hole in the Day was buried by Fr. Pierz, without a Requiem Mass, in the unconsecrated section of the Roman Catholic cemetery at Old Crow Wing. In an interview during the 1920s, an elderly Catholic Ojibwe recalled that mobbed up Crow Wing political boss Clement Hudon Beaulieu and the other mixed race merchants with whom he had secretly hired the Pillager Band assassins, pretended at the time to be very scandalized by Fr. Pierz's burial of the Chief.

According to Ojibwe author and historian Anton Treuer, the oral tradition passed down among Hole in the Day's extended family is that the Chief's non-Catholic relatives objected for different reasons to Ignatius Hole in the Day's choice of burial. This is why they secretly dug up the Chief's body, and reburied him with traditional Ojibwe ritual at a secret location near the town of White Earth.

In 1871, following a battle with pneumonia from which he never entirely recovered, Father Pierz reluctantly accepted the limitations of age and retired to the predominantly German-speaking parish of Rich Prairie, Morrison County. It was renamed Pierz in his honor.

According to Fr. Robert J. Voigt, "In Father Pierz's time, the Masses in this church were usually Low Masses at which the congregation sang German songs accompanied by Mr Anthony Rauch on the violin. Most of the time it was the Mass of the Blessed Virgin, for Father Pierz had permission to say that Mass daily on account of his poor eyesight."

His health, however, continued to decline. In a letter written on January 20, 1872, Father Pierz declared, "During the past year, my eyesight has failed me so that I am unable to read newspapers anymore. In the eighty-seventh year of my life my health is perceptively declining. Two years ago, I was still able to take care of twelve missions, Indian, German, English-speaking. This year my Right Rev. Bishop urged me to retire and live with him or at least take charge of some small German mission. Two attacks of apoplexy endangered my life; but my homeopathic medicines soon restored my health. At the present I hear a continued buzzing sound in my ears, reminding me strongly that the time has come to prepare for my last mission journey."

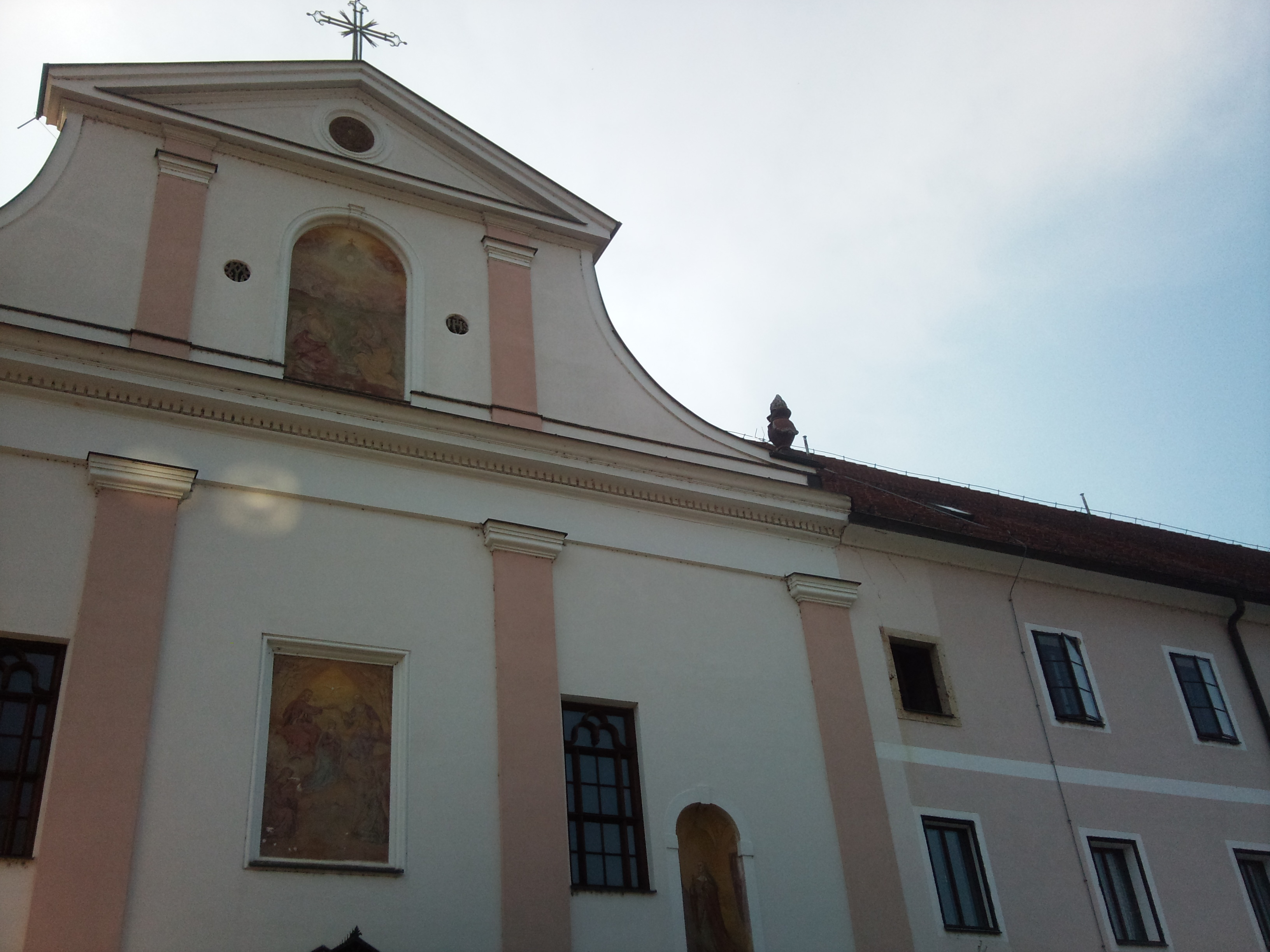
The Franciscan Monastery Church in Kamnik, as it appears today.

On September 6, 1873, Father Pierz sailed for Slovenia to live out his last years. After spending the winter at the Franciscan monastery in his native Kamnik, he moved to Ljubljana, where he lived for several years as a permanent guest in the Diocesan Chancery. The Austro-Hungarian Crown awarded him a full pension.

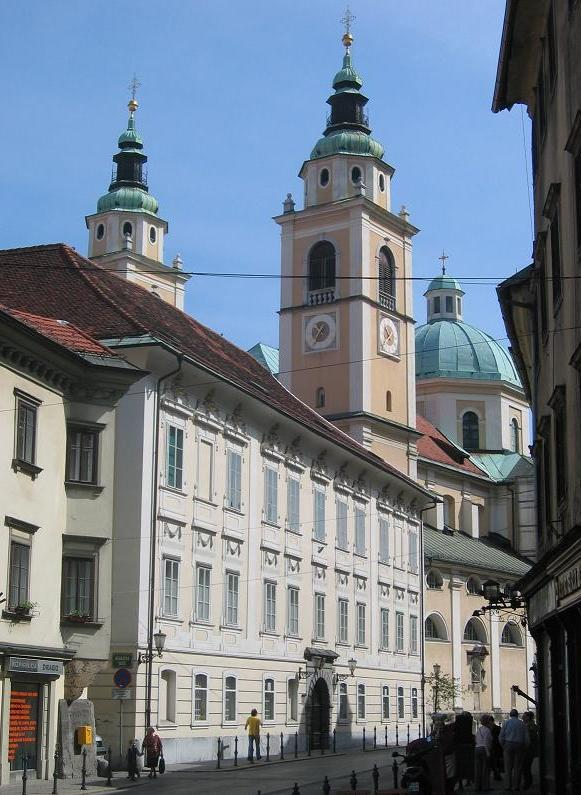
The Bishop's Palace, where Father Pierz lived out the last years of his life, at Sts. Cyril and Methodius Square, with Ljubljana Cathedral in the background.

According to Fr. John Seliskar, who knew Fr. Pierz in his last years, "The past for him was a blank; he had no realization of his surroundings. He would frequently hail a cab and request the driver to take him to Wabasha, or some Indian mission he attended in America. A few minutes' drive would satisfy him, for he no longer remembered the order he had given the coachman. He left his memory and his mind among the red men. The writer of these lines remembers the aged missionary, bowed down with the weight of years, with a faraway look in his eyes, walking the streets of Laibach, but his spirit apparently wandering in the American forests."

== Death and legacy ==
=== Death and burial ===
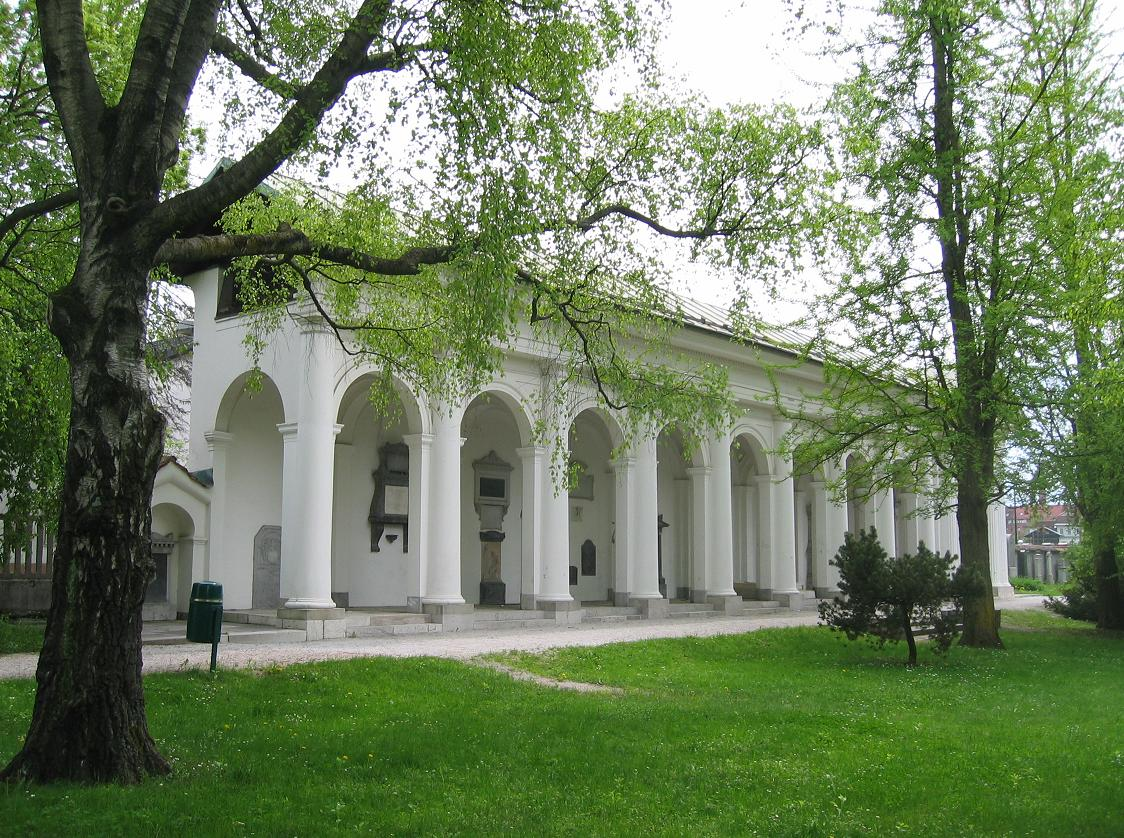
The Neoclassical arcade porch at the former site of St Christopher's Cemetery in Ljubljana.

Father Pierz died on January 22, 1880. After a Tridentine Requiem Mass offered by Bishop Janez Zlatoust Pogačar of the Diocese of Ljubljana, he was interred in Saint Christopher's Cemetery in the Bežigrad District of Ljubljana.

As part of the Axis occupation of Slovenia during the Second World War, the tombstones from St. Christopher's Cemetery were all removed by the German Wehrmacht and Royal Italian Army and used to make pillboxes. After the war, the pillboxes were destroyed without any thought to their religious or historical importance.

Furthermore, the cemetery and the two churches associated with it were destroyed by order of the Marxist-Leninist Premier of the Socialist Federal Republic of Yugoslavia, Joseph Broz Tito, in 1955, in order to create a fairground for the 7th Congress of the Communist Party of Yugoslavia. When Father Robert J. Voigt visited Ljubljana in 1963, he learned that the precise location of Father Pierz's remains was unmarked, but still known.

=== Legacy ===
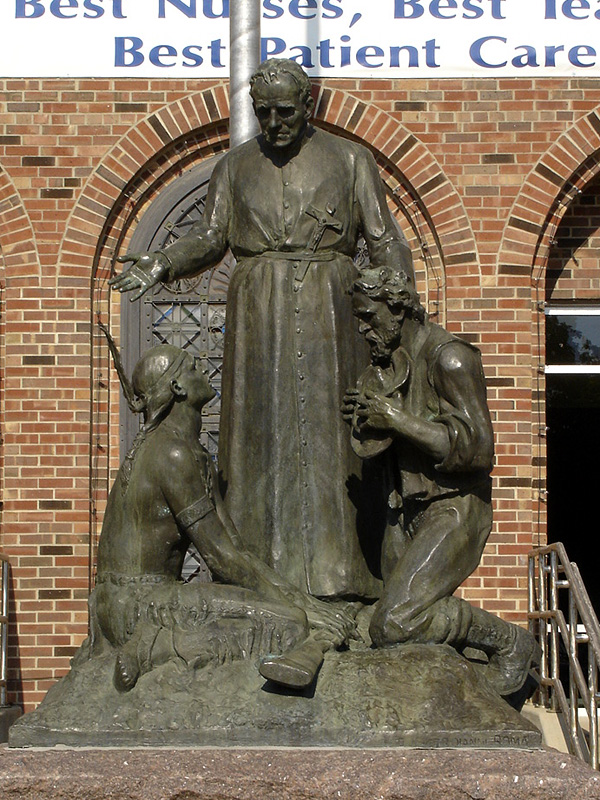
Statue of Francis Xavier Pierz, which formerly stood in front of St. Cloud Hospital.

Father Pierz continues to be fondly remembered in both his native land and in central Minnesota. He remains a popular figure in Minnesota folklore, with stories about him passed down among both the Ojibwa and White ethnic Catholics of the area.

Writing in 1997, Jewish-American historian of America's religious architecture Marilyn J. Chiat described Fr. Pierz's legacy as follows, "Father Francis X. Pierz, a missionary to Indians in central Minnesota, published a series of articles in 1851 in German Catholic newspapers advocating Catholic settlement in central Minnesota. Large numbers of immigrants, mainly German, but also Slovenian and Polish, responded. Over 20 parishes where formed in what is now Stearns County, each centered on a church-oriented hamlet. As the farmers prospered, the small frame churches were replaced by more substantial buildings of brick or stone such as St. Mary, Help of Christians, a Gothic Revival stone structure built in 1873. Stearns County retains in its German character and is still home to one of the largest rural Catholic populations in Anglo-America."

Furthermore, according to Kathleen Neils Conzen, "Stearns County Germans early established daughter settlements at West Union in Todd County, Millerville in Douglas County, and Pierz in Morrison County, later flooded into North Dakota (where 'Stearns County German' remains a recognized ethnicity today), and in 1905 negotiated with the Canadian authorities to establish the St. Peter Colony in north-central Saskatchewan."

- The city of Pierz, Minnesota, which was Fr. Pierz's last parish assignment before returning to the Austro-Hungarian Empire, is named in his honor.
- A statue of Fr. Pierz, which celebrates his role as a missionary and peacemaker by showing an Ojibwe warrior and a German-American settler kneeling before him, was dedicated in front of St. Cloud Hospital in 1952. During the early 21st century, however, the statue was removed following protests by the St. Cloud chapter of the American Indian Movement, who had believed, incorrectly, that Fr. Pierz was associated with the much later linguistic imperialism, English only policy, and the other abuses within the residential school system. The statue was re-erected inside Billig Park, along Main Street South, in nearby Pierz, Minnesota as the Reverend Father Pierz Monument.
- In Slovenia, a bronze monument to him was erected in Podbrezje, his last parish assignment before going to the US.
- A large collection of his letters and poetry are preserved in the Archives of the Republic of Slovenia in Ljubljana.
- The Slovene Ethnographic Museum in Ljubljana holds numerous rare American Indian artifacts collected and donated by Father Pierz.
- The St. Francis Xavier Catholic school in Sartell, Minnesota is also named in his honor.
- In 2018 a group of 39 Slovenian pilgrims visited both St. Cloud and the Church of St. Stephen to pay tribute to Fr. Pierz, Bishop James Trobec, and the role that Slovenian-American missionaries and pioneers had played in the building of Central Minnesota.

== Quotes ==
"A missioner in America is like a plaything in the hand of God. Sufferings and joys alternate constantly. No conquest for the Kingdom can be achieved here without exertion and the sweat of one's brow. Our dear Lord permits us to be humiliated and prepared by much suffering before he employs us as instruments of His mercy in the conversion of the Pagans and allows us to enjoy the comforts of soul their spiritual rebirth causes."

== Legends ==
I remember an incident of Father Pierz and a man named Dugal, the Government blacksmith at Crow Wing. This Dugal was quite pious but went on a spree once in a while – once a month. And Father Pierz would meet him in this condition and say to him in French, 'You are drunk again, my pig.' Once, on a trip to Leech Lake, Father Pierz got a hold of Dugal's supply of whiskey and only gave it out to him in small portions. Dugal begged for the bottle but Pierz said, 'No, no, you my pig.' Dugal when drunk feared Pierz. Once as he saw Pierz entering a store and knowing he was under a good supple of liquor, Dugal hid himself under a buffalo robe. But Pierz chatted and stayed so long that Dugal finally gave up and, casting off the robe, said, 'Father, I confess!'
