= Podjelše =

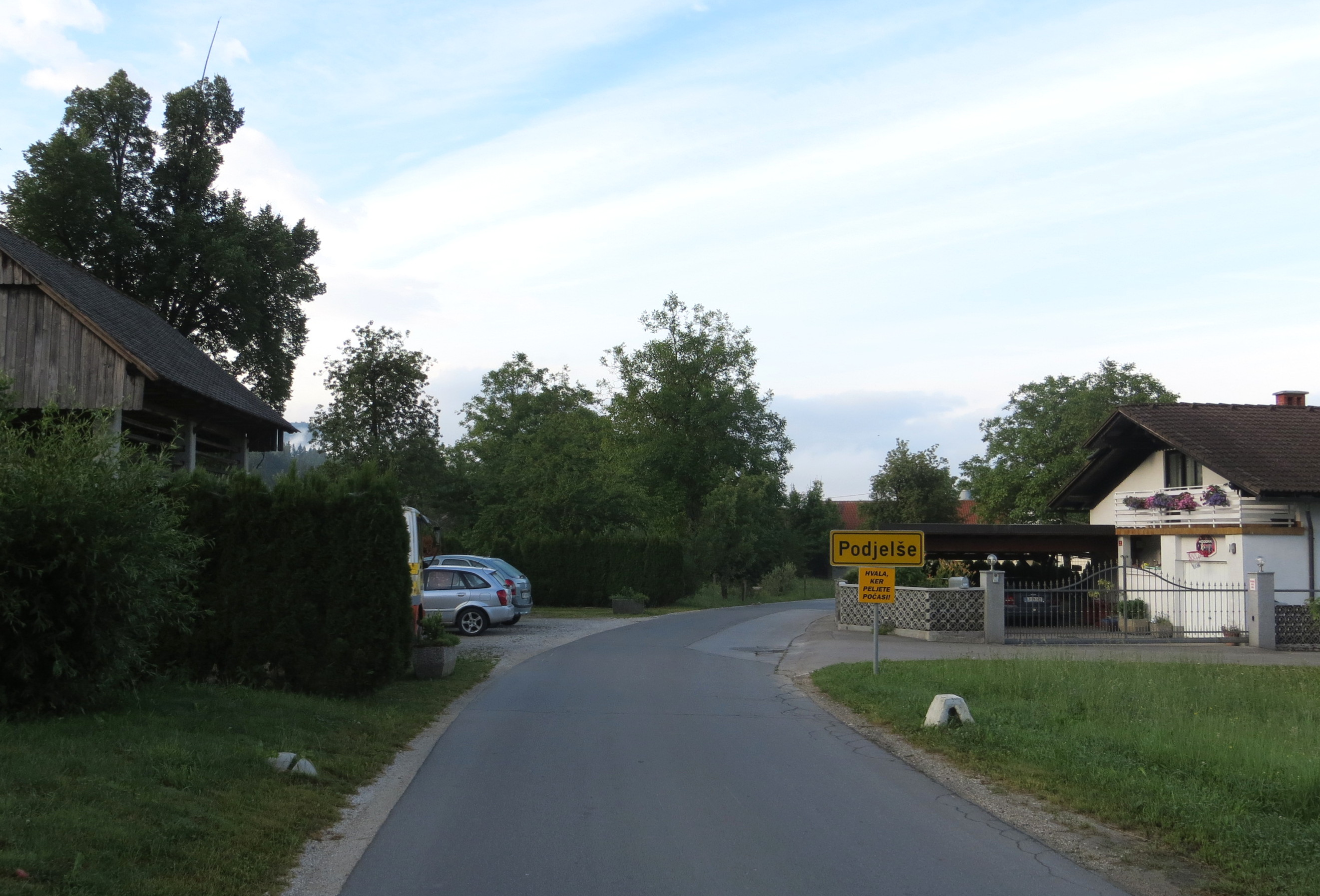

- Location in Slovenia
- Coordinates: 46°14′48.75″N 14°36′51.08″E
- Country: Slovenia
- Traditional region: Upper Carniola
- Statistical region: Central Slovenia
- Municipality: Kamnik

Area
  - Total: 0.4 km^{2} (0.15 sq mi)
- Elevation: 418.9 m (1,374 ft)

Population (2002)
  - Total: 34

Podjelše (pronounced [pɔdˈjeːu̯ʃɛ]) is a small settlement between Mekinje and Godič in the Municipality of Kamnik in the Upper Carniola region of Slovenia.
