= Mississippi River Band of Chippewa Indians =

Mississippi River Band of Chippewa Indians (Ojibwe: Gichi-ziibiwininiwag) or simply the Mississippi Chippewa, are an historical Ojibwa Band inhabiting the headwaters of the Mississippi River and its tributaries in present-day Minnesota.

According to the oral history of the Mississippi Chippewa, they were primarily of the southern branch of Ojibwe who spread from the "Fifth Stopping Place" of Baawiting (Sault Ste. Marie region) along Lake Superior's southern shores until arriving at the "Sixth Stopping Place" of the Saint Louis River. They continued westward across the Savanna Portage, and spread both northward and southward along the Mississippi River and its major tributaries.

Before entering the treaty process with the United States, the Mississippi Chippewa consisted of the following sub-bands:

- Cedar Lake, Minnesota Band
- Crow Wing, Minnesota Band
- Gull Lake, Minnesota Band
- Mille Lacs, Minnesota Band
- Pelican Lake, Minnesota Band
- Pokegama Lake, Minnesota Band
- Rabbit Lake, Minnesota Band
- Rice Lake, Minnesota Band
- Sandy Lake, Minnesota Band
- Snake River Band
- Swan River Band
- Trout Lake, Minnesota Band
- White Oak Point, Minnesota Band

and many villages associated with these sub-bands. Together, they controlled the main north–south trade corridor of the Mississippi River headwaters. Their traditional use area included the stretch of the Mississippi River between its confluence with the Leech Lake River and its confluence with the Crow Wing River—known in the Ojibwe language as Gichi-ziibi (Big River)—and including the Brainerd Lakes Area.

== History and treaty making ==
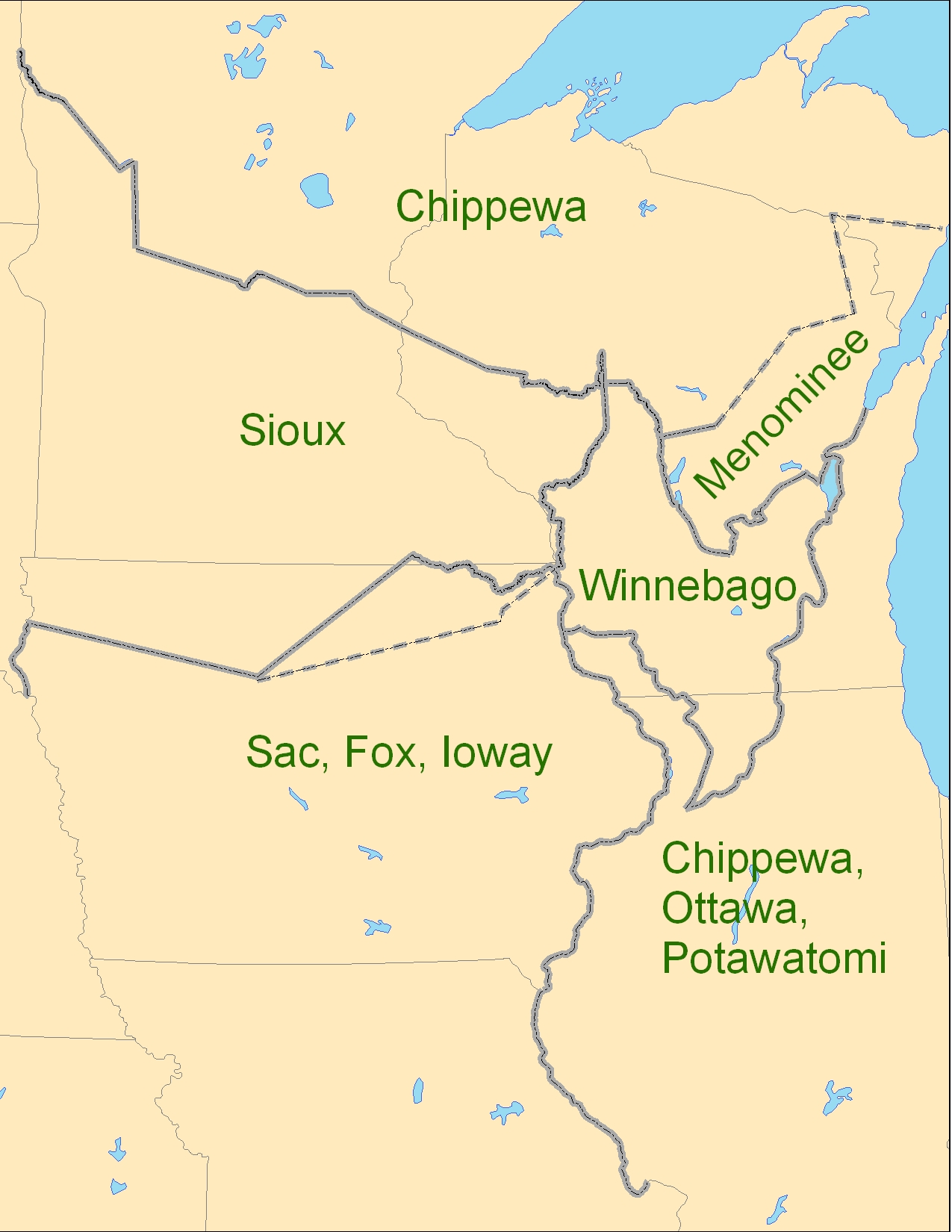
Prairie du Chien Line, 1825 Minnesota

In 1825, with the First Treaty of Prairie du Chien, the United States drew the Prairie du Chien, Wisconsin Line to separate the Ojibwe from the Dakota, believing the two were still at war with each other. The Ojibwe and the Dakota had ended their war for nearly a generation by that time and had only infrequent skirmishes. In 1830 the Indian Removal Act was signed by Andrew Jackson. This act of Congress gave the president power to force Indian tribes to move to land west of the Mississippi River.

The Mississippi Chippewa, along with the Red Lake, Pillager and the Lake Superior bands, entered into the Treaty of St. Peters in 1837 with the US. They ceded to the United States what is now part of northern Wisconsin and east-central Minnesota.

In 1850, the US government changed the annuity distribution point from La Pointe, Wisconsin to Sandy Lake, in an effort to move the tribes further west. Four thousand Ojibwe of various bands showed up in early October at the designated site, but no government agents or supplies were there. After waiting for two months in deteriorating weather, 170 Ojibwe died. The government finally brought the supplies and annuities but, because of harsh weather at that time of year, another 230 Ojibwe died on their returns to their lands. This became known as the Sandy Lake tragedy.

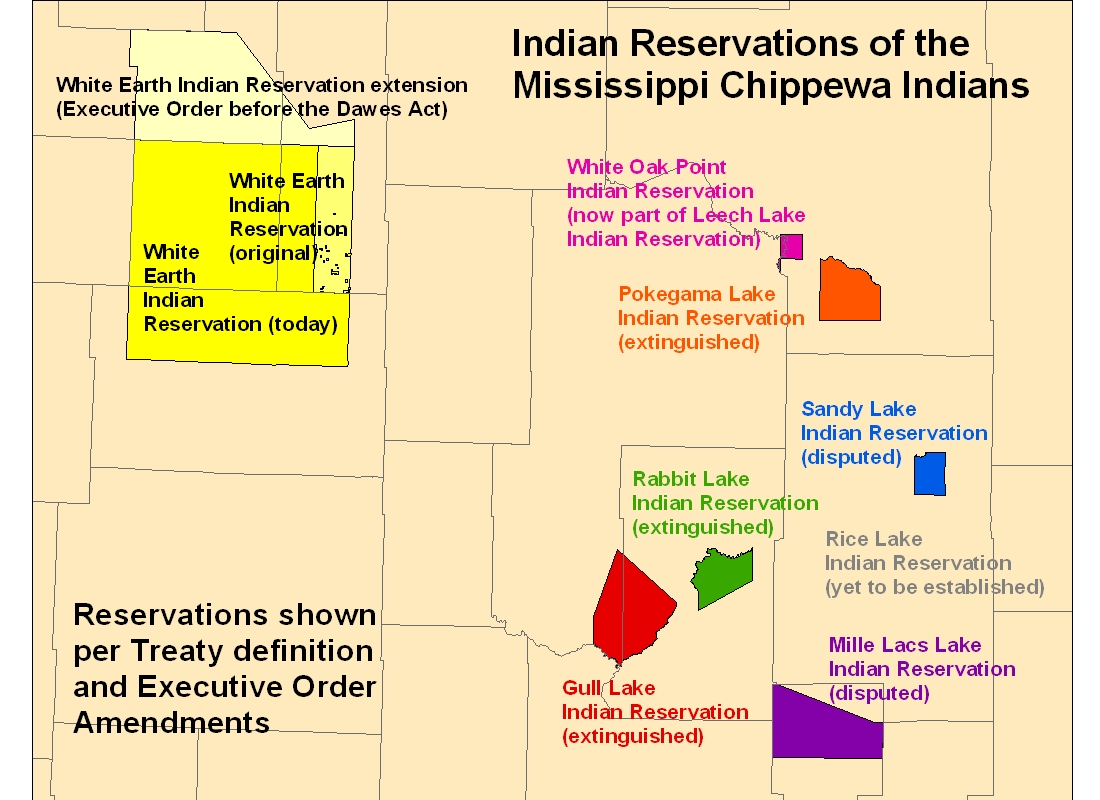
Reservations of the Mississippi Chippewa in Minnesota

In 1855, because of the tragedy at Sandy Lake, the Mississippi Chippewa, along with the Pillager Band of Chippewa Indians, agreed upon the Treaty of Washington for the land cession of most of northern Minnesota. In exchange, the United States promised three reservations for the Pillagers and six reservations for the Mississippi Chippewa. In addition, as in other treaties, the tribes retained the right for traditional harvest of off-reservation resources, such as fish and game. (This right faded from general knowledge as living conditions changed, until it was revived in the late 20th century as tribes worked to exercise traditional practices and rights; one example was the Wisconsin Walleye War of the late 1980s.)

The six reservations were the following:

- Gull Lake Indian Reservation
- Mille Lac Indians Reservation
- Pokegama Lake Indian Reservation
- Sandy Lake Indian Reservation
- Rabbit Lake Indian Reservation
- Rice Lake Indian Reservation

Due to confusing records kept by the U.S. Bureau of Land Management, the Rice Lake Indian Reservation was never established. Confusion arose because several different lakes around Sandy Lake had names which, translated into English, all seemed to mean "Rice Lake." This led to confusion related to which map was consulted, and the issue of where the reservation was to be located was never resolved. It appeared the Rice Lake Indian Reservation was located in the following areas:

- fully within the boundaries of the Sandy Lake Indian Reservation on its north end, or
- adjacent to the Sandy Lake Indian Reservation on its south end; and
- at the southeastern corner on the eastern edge of Sandy Lake Indian Reservation, or
- on the southeastern corner on the southern edge of Sandy Lake Indian Reservation.

The Rice Lake Band claimed these representations were all incorrect, and the proper location of the agreed Rice Lake Indian Reservation was much farther south.

=== 1862 Chippewa offer Lincoln to fight the Sioux ===
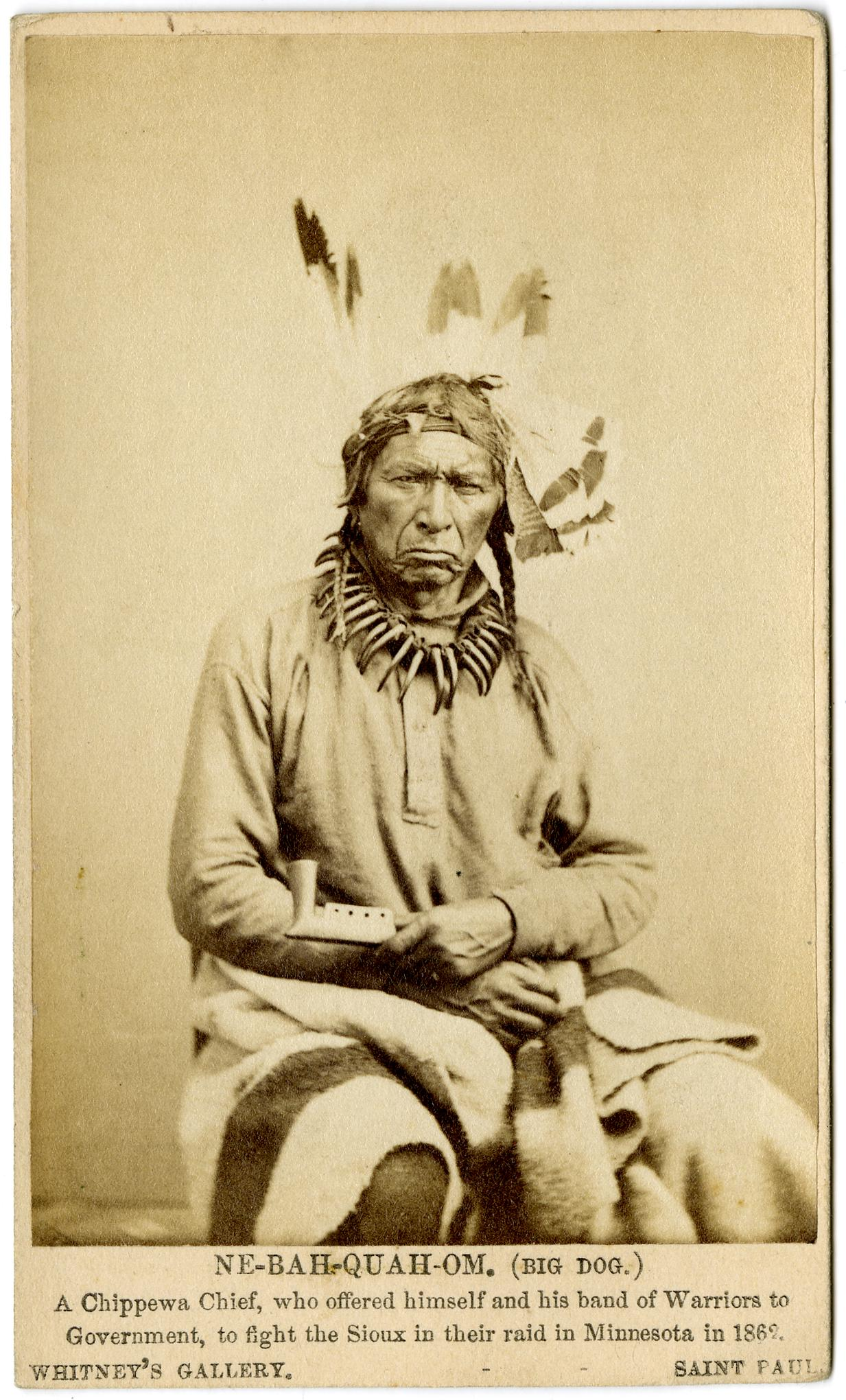
Chippewa Chief Big Dog offered to fight the Sioux for Lincoln. The St Paul paper felt his appearance was the epitome of an indigenous warrior.

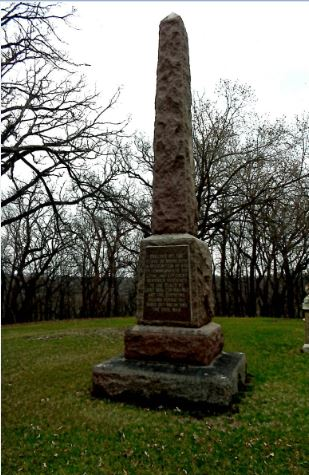
Minnesota monument to Mille Lacs war Chief Mou-Zoo-Mau-Nee and his 300 Mille Lacs and Sandy Lake warriors who offered to fight the Sioux and defend Fort Ripley during the Sioux uprising. Dedicated 1914 at the Fort Ridgely because Fort Ripley was abandoned by then. The monument is the same size as the one the State put up for the men of the 5th Minnesota lost at Ridgely and Redwood Ferry.

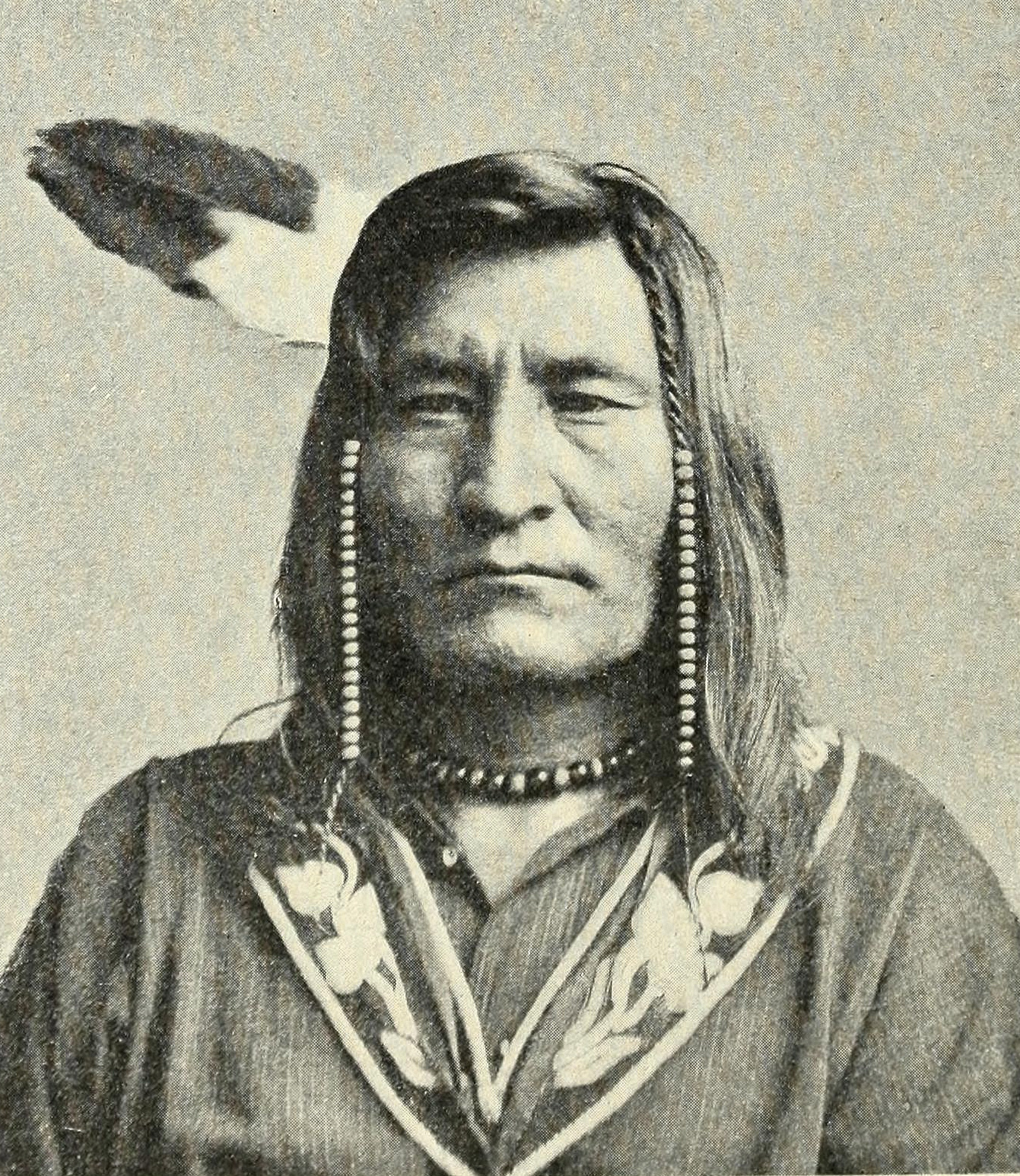
Pembina Chippewa Chief Es-En-Ce (Little Shell II) fought the displaced Santee Sioux.

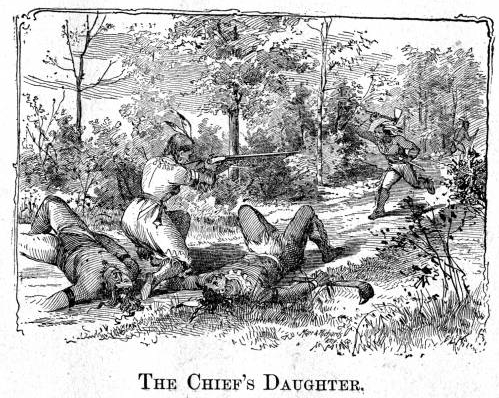
Hanging Cloud, the woman warrior of a Wisconsin Ojibwe band fighting the Sioux in Minnesota.

On 18 August when the Mdewakanton attacked the Indian Agency on their reservation Chippewa-Sioux relations were already strained. In June 1862 Chief Bagone-giizhig (Hole-in-the-Day, Gull Lake Band) and Little Crow exchanged letters over a Chippewa having killed a Sioux. Little Crow told Hole-in-the-Day that the Sioux wanted their due. Also in June, a Sioux-Chippewa skirmish took place near Pembina with losses on both sides. However, one of Chief Red Bear's sons was killed by the Sioux.

The attack on the Lower Sioux Agency would bring war and mounted patrols to Minnesota and the Department of the Northwest until June 1866. In the north, several unfortified stagecoach stations along the Red River Trails were attacked despite being on Chippewa land. When Judge Cooper arrived at Hole-in-the-Day's village, during the first week of the war, he learned the Sioux had attacked the Chippewa at Otter tail lakes. He also informed Governor Alexander Ramsey that the Gull Lake warriors were dancing around Sioux scalps when he arrived. Hole-in-the-Day had his own major grievances with the Government, but they were not enough for him to join the Santee Sioux. Like the other leaders of the Chippewa he offered to fight the Sioux. The Chippewa were experiencing that same fraud as the Sioux and the timing of their annuity payments were coincidently close so the media linked their dis-satisfactions in an anti-Native American narrative. At the same time the media published story after story of the Chippewa support of the Government vs. the Sioux.

Company D of the 5th Minnesota Infantry Regiment, was garrisoned at Fort Abercrombie, on the Red River of the North 150 miles due west of Gull Lake. They would be augmented by G Co. 9th Minnesota which had a large component of bi-racial White Earth Chippewa. One of whom was killed and buried with military honors at St Cloud, Minnesota. When G Company arrived at Fort Abercrombie the Fort was under attack. They went into action to break the siege. G Company joined the garrison and immediately endured the Sioux siege that followed.

On 2 September 1862 two Wisconsin Fond Du Lac Chiefs sent President Abraham Lincoln a letter offering to fight the Sioux so Minnesotans could go fight the south. The St Paul Pioneer and Democrat published that letter front page on 11 September 1862. Over the next week it was reprinted or referenced by multiple newspapers across the country: Chicago Tribune, Chicago Times New York Times, New York Herald Washington D.C Evening Star, The Portland Daily Press, Portland Maine Wheeling Daily Intelligencer W. VA, Cleveland Morning, Vermont Chronicle, The Weekly North Iowa Times, Mankato Semi Weekly and republished in St Paul on the 19th.

On 3 September a Mille Lacs band Chief went to St Cloud with the same offer that also made the papers. The post Commander at Fort Ripley was informed and he extended State hospitality to the Chief until a response was received.

On 6 September the speculation of Chief Hole in the Day joining Little Crow prompted Shaw-Bosh-Kung, head chief of the Mille Lacs band of Chippewa to send 700-750 warriors to Fort Ripley to volunteer to fight the Sioux and support the garrison along with the Sandy Lake band. William P. Dole, the Indian agent was at Fort Ribley, asked that they return to their reservation. He told them they would be informed if they were needed. However, war Chief Mou-Zoo-Mau-Nee (Iron-Walker) and 200 Mille Lacs warriors remained at the fort as did 100 from the Sandy Lake band. Both the Sandy Lake and Mille Lacs bands gained "non-removal" designations from the United States as a result. Commissioner Dole gave the Mille Lacs band a document stating they could remain on their reservation for 1000 years for their actions.

On 15 September a council was held at the Crow Wing agency where 22 Chiefs of the Mississippi and Pillager Bands "offered their services, and if necessary their life's to punish the enemies of the white people, the Sioux..." Notable Chippewa there were Chiefs Hole-in-the-Day, Buffalo, and Flat-mouth.

On 22 September 40-50 Chippewa leaders arrived at the Minnesota State Capitol at the invitation of Gov. Ramsey thinking that their offer to fight the Sioux had been accepted. General Pope would not accept their service as a matter of "public policy". Nearly all of Minnesota's Chippewa wanted to help. Gov. Ramsey told the Chiefs that Lincoln was busy with the civil war, but if they were needed they would be informed. This Chippewa effort made the news in many cities. The next day the Mdewakanton surrendered at Camp Release. St Paul's two photo studios made images of many of those Chippewa leaders in 1862 that are in the Minnesota Historical Society archives.

Hanging Cloud, the Chippewa Bear Clan "princess" was part of a war party from Wisconsin that came to Minnesota during the war. The war party was involved in a two-day engagement. The press had labeled her a "princess" when she first made the news for being the daughter of a Rice Lake, Wisconsin Chief affiliated to the Lac Courte Oreilles Band of Lake Superior Chippewa Indians.

1863 Late February 22 Chiefs waited in Chicago for Hole-in-the-Day and the Indian Commissioner to go with them to see Lincoln. In April 1863 President Lincoln summoned the Mille Lacs and other Mississippi bands to Washington. He repeated what the Indian agent had told them at Fort Ripley, that the Mille Lacs Band could stay on their reservation for 1,000 years for their actions in support of the Government. From that the Mille Lacs band created the "non-removable" label for those that participated at Fort Ripley. Both Chippewa treaties of 1863 and 1864 identify the Mille Lacs band as being "non-removable" in Article 12. "owing to the heretofore good conduct of the Mille Lac Indians, they shall not be compelled to remove ...."12 Stat. 1249 Article 12 makes the Milles Band unique.

- In 1875 Mille Lacs head Chief Shaw-Bosh-Kung described his 1863 meeting with Lincoln for the Chippewa Indian Agency record: "The President took our hands and promised us faithfully and encouraged us and he said we could live on our reservation for 10 years and if faithful to whites and behave ourselves [and are] friendly to whites you shall increase the number to 100 and you may increase it to 1,000 years if you are good Indians, and through your good behavior at the time of war (we were good and never raised our hands against the whites) The Secretary of the Interior and the President said that we should be considered good Indians and remain at Mille Lacs so long as we want."

In June, Hole-in-the-Day offered Gen. Sibley 600 warriors for his expedition into Dakota Territory that Sibley turned down. Not dissuaded, in July he offered his warriors to Major Hatch.

Hatch's Battalion or the Indian Battalion of Minnesota Volunteers was initially proposed to consist of 1000 Chippewa.

The Chippewa offers to fight the Sioux had the interest and support of Gov. Ramsey as well as both US Senators Rice and Wilkinson. With Generals Pope and Sibley opposed, the Senators went higher to Secretary of War Stanton of the Department of War. In July, 1863 the Senators, united in their dislike for Pope, requested that Secretary of War Stanton authorize an independent mounted Indian Battalion of Minnesota Volunteers consisting of the 1000 Chippewa "auxiliaries". Gen. Pope in particular objected to the Chippewa Auxiliaries. Major Hatch meet with Chief Hole-in-the-Day in July when the Chief offered warriors to join Hatch. The battalion was to report directly to the War Department and had a "roving commission" to act on its own discretion. This freedom of tactical operation was a first. Both Gen. Pope and Gen. Sibley had objected to a Minnesota unit not reporting to them. Pope complained about the politics and the Senators. At the same time Ohio senator Benjamin Wade sent a letter to Secretary Stanton suggesting that he make Senator Rice a Major General and use him to replace Gen. Pope "as the Chippewa had complete confidence in Senator Rice". President Lincoln endorsed the letter and made E.A.C Hatch a Major in the USV. Pope was able to get the entire plan changed. At Pembina 37 Metis, of Chippewa heritage, joined Hatch. When Little Crow talked to the Governor at Fort Garry he inquired if the rumors were true about the formation of a Battalion to hunt him. The Battalion was mustered-in during August–September 1863, for a period of three years or the end of the Indian War. It was mustered out in June 1866 just months short of the three years. It was created solely for the execution of the Indian War and promoted as sweeping the Sioux from the north.

1864 saw the White-earth men of G Company 9th Minn gain recognition as the State's best skirmishers. They along with the 59th Colored Troops fought the rear guard action for the North at the Battle of Brices Crossroads. Their sharpshooting enabled some of the 59th to escape entrapment at one bridge crossing. Capture for those troops would have meant summary executions for being "black".

All Minnesota bands of Mississippi Chippewa were ordered to move from their existing reservations to the area surrounding the Leech Lake and Lake Winnibigoshish reservations. Due to strife between the removed Mississippi, Leech Lake Pillager and Lake Winnibigoshish bands, the Mississippi Chippewa negotiated with the United States for resettlement. The Pokegama Lake Band, together with the Removable Sandy Lake Band, negotiated to remain eventually forming the White Oak Point Band on the White Oak Point Reservation. In 1934 they merged with Cass Lake, Lake Winnibigoshish and Leech Lake Indian reservations to form the existing Leech Lake Band of Ojibwe and its reservation.

1865The media reported that Hole-in-the-Day still was regretting that the Chippewa battalion had not been organized as intended.

With the signing of the 1867 Treaty of Washington, the remaining Mississippi Chippewa about Leech Lake agreed to resettlement to the west, creating the White Earth Reservation. In the 20th century, the bands combined to form the contemporary White Earth Band of Chippewa. Under pressure from the lumbermen and farm settlers who wanted native lands, the US government believed the White Earth Reservation was the answer to the "Chippewa Problem" and strongly pressured the Mille Lacs and the remaining Sandy Lake bands to relocate there. Many did, becoming the "Removable" peoples, while those who remained in their traditional territories in the central part of the state became the "Non-removable".In 1867 a treaty with the Chippewa of the Mississippi tribe and the United States government was signed. This treaty regulates the farming and logging land that the Indians received. The author of this article Charles J. Kappler played a prominent role in the passing of this treaty along with bringing Indian law cases before the United States supreme court.

Late in the fall of 1885 ex-Secretary of War and ex-Minnesota governor Ramsey escorted the son of Chippewa Chief Hole in the Day to Washington D.C. as Minnesota's candidate to West Point.

== Successors apparent ==
Because of the “Treaty with the Chippewa, 1855” Indians from the Mille Lacs Band of Ojibwe and White Earth Band of Chippewa still receive proportions today. Article 3 of the treaty states; “In consideration of, and in full compensation for, the cessions made by the said Mississippi, Pillager, and Lake Winnibigoshish bands of Chippewa Indians, in the first article of this agreement, the United States hereby agree and stipulate to pay, expend, and make provision for, the said bands of Indians, as follows, viz: For the Mississippi bands". Though the Mississippi River Band of Chippewa Indians no longer exists legally, the majority of the Mille Lacs Band of Ojibwe and White Earth Band of Chippewa still identify as Mississippi Chippewa. Successors apparent of the Mississippi Chippewa are:

- Leech Lake Band of Ojibwe
- Mille Lacs Band of Ojibwe
- White Earth Band of Ojibwe

== Burial Mounds ==
Burial mounds of Indigenous people, including the Mississippi Band of Chippewa Indians have been a long tradition in their culture. Burial mounds are a sacred cemetery where their ancestors are buried. It is a place of respect, remembrance, and prayer. The article by Timothy Pauketat, “Dictionary of American History. . Encyclopedia.com. 28 Mar. 2022.” Encyclopedia.com explains how some Indian burial mounds have been discovered and accredited to being a burial mound . One example of preserving a sacred mound is Grand Mound Historic Site located near International Falls, MN. This site is one of 25 national Historic Landmarks in Minnesota. Kent Whitworth, MNHS director and CEO states, “The historical importance of this site cannot be understated, but we must protect it and provide education while also ensuring that Native people can care for the place where their ancestors lie.” Because of the significance of their importance to Native American people states have found it necessary to preserve them. The Effigy Mounds National Monument located in Iowa is an example of that .
