= David Cooper (jurist) =

American judge (1821–1877)

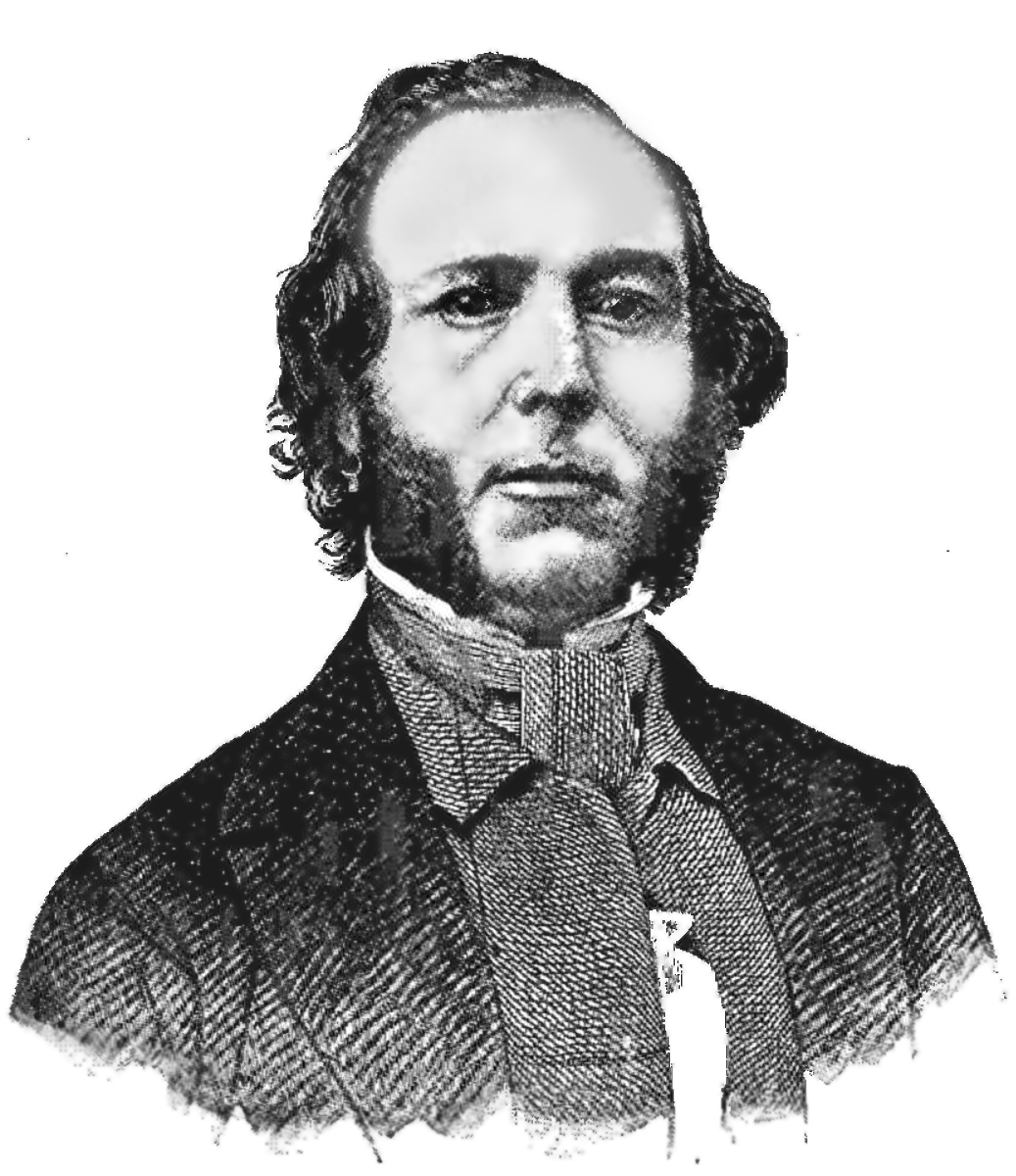

First Associate Justice of the Minnesota Territorial Supreme Court
- In office March 19, 1849 – April 7, 1853
- Appointed by: Zachary Taylor
- Succeeded by: Andrew G. Chatfield

Personal details
- Born: July 22, 1821 Frederick County, Maryland, US
- Died: June 18, 1877 (aged 55) Salt Lake City, Utah, US
- Party: Whig Party
- Education: Pennsylvania College

David Cooper (1821–1877) was an American lawyer and jurist. He served from 1850 to 1853 as an associate justice of the Minnesota (Territory) Supreme Court.

== Biography ==
Cooper was born on July 22, 1821, in Frederick County, Maryland. In 1831, he moved to Gettysburg, Pennsylvania, where he attended Pennsylvania College. He later studied law in the office of his brother. He was admitted to practice law in 1845 and practiced in Louistown, Pennsylvania. In 1848, he canvassed a portion of Pennsylvania for the Whig Party.

As a result of this service to the Whig Party, Cooper was appointed by President Zachary Taylor as an associate justice of the Minnesota Territorial Supreme Court on March 15, 1849. He was confirmed by the Senate on March 19, 1849. He held the office from July 14, 1850, to April 7, 1853.

When the Mdewakanton uprising broke Governor Alexander Ramsey asked him to go to Gull Lake and ascertain Chippewa Chief Hole in the Day's position. Judge Cooper was Hole-in-the-Day's legal advisor. When he arrived at Hole in the Day's village, he learned the Sioux had attacked the Chippewa at Otter tail lakes. He also informed Gov. Ramsey that the Chippewa were dancing with Sioux scalps when he arrived.

Cooper later practiced law in St. Paul, Minnesota, until 1864, when he moved to Nevada Territory, where he made mining titles the specialty of his law practice. He later moved to Utah and died in Salt Lake City on June 18, 1877.

== Criticism by legal profession and newspapers ==
Along with Chief Justice Aaron Goodrich, Cooper was frequently criticized by members of the legal profession as unfit and incompetent. However, no charge of corruption or malfeasance was ever made against either of them. After an unfavorable editorial regarding Justice Cooper appeared in the St. Paul Pioneer newspaper in 1851, Justice Cooper's brother, Joseph Cooper, assaulted the newspaper editor, James M. Goodhue, with a knife and inflicted two wounds. Goodhue responded by firing a pistol at Cooper, who received a shot in his groin. Joseph Cooper died approximately two months later, and it was said that the pistol wound had hastened his death.

== Sources ==
- Douglas A. Hedin, ed., Documents Regarding the Nominations, Confirmations, Recess Appointments, Commissions, Oaths of Office, Removals, and Terms of the Ten Justices who Served on the Supreme Court of Minnesota Territory, 1849-1858
- Clark Bell, "The Supreme Court of Minnesota", Vol. 17, Medico-Legal Journal (1869)
- L. Hubbard, W. Murray, J. Baker, W. Upham, Minnesota in Three Centuries, 1655-1908, Vol 2, pp. 427–428, 449-450 (1908).
- "A Golden Age of Journalism and Politics?" at OneTubeRadio.com
