= Hole in the Day =

Ojibwe chief (1825–1868)

Hole-in-the
- Bagone-giizhig
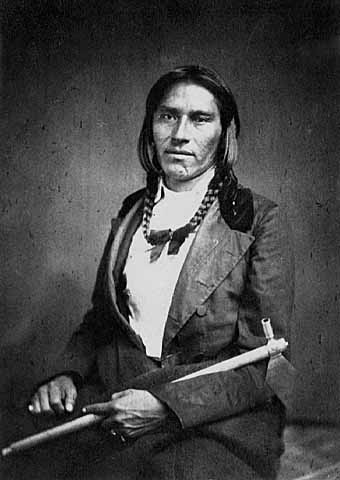
- Portrait of Hole-in-the-Day by Joel Emmons Whitney
- Born: 1825; Michigan Territory, U.S.
- Died: June 27, 1868 (aged 42–43); Sylvan Township, Minnesota, U.S.
- Cause of death: Assassination

Hole-in-the-Day (c. 1825–1868) was a prominent chief of the Mississippi band of the Ojibwe in Minnesota. The native pronunciation has been written with different spellings due to variations in Ojibwe accents; these include Bagone-giizhig, Bagwunagijik, Bug-o-nay-ki-shig, Pugonakeshig or Puk-O-Nay-Keshig. Hole-in-the-Day has also been called Hole-in-the-Sky. The name refers to a dream in which the guardian spirit was seen through an opening in the clouds. It also refers to the Anishinaabek name for the constellation of the same name, also known as the Pleiades.

== Biography ==
Daguerreotype of Hole-In-The-Day with a gunstock war club c. 1855

In 1847 Hole-in-the-Day succeeded his father, Hole in the Day (senior), as head chief of the Mississippi Band of the Ojibwe in central Minnesota. His father was a member of the Noka (bear) clan and that passed to him. Like his father, Hole-in-the-Day participated in skirmishes against the Santee Dakota, and was prominent in negotiations with the Santee Dakota and with the U.S. Government. Hole-in-the-Day strove to be considered the head chief of all Minnesota Ojibwe. Many government officials actually did consider him to be head chief in Minnesota. This was due to his endeavoring to be involved in most, if not all, important negotiations and dealings between the Minnesota Ojibwe/Chippewa and the U.S. government, and that he presented himself in an articulate and amiable manner. However, many Chippewa leaders in Minnesota did not recognize him as their head chief.

== Personal life ==
Hole-in-the-Day had several wives. Some accounts number them as many as eight. Other sources reported five wives. What is agreed on though is that one of his wives was a Roman Catholic Irish-American "white" woman named Ellen McCarthy. They began cohabitating after meeting on his journey to the eastern United States, where she worked as a hotel maid and may also have worked as a journalist. She is described as "Irish" but whether this means she was born in Ireland, or simply that her ancestors came Ireland is unclear. Some sources give his name as Joseph Hole-in-the-Day. He was considering becoming a Catholic at the time of his death, but had not been baptized. At the time of his assassination he was reported to be the wealthiest man in Minnesota at being worth $2 million.

Late in the fall of 1885, the ex-Secretary of War and ex-governor, Ramsey escorted the son of Hole in the Day and Ellen to Washington D.C. as Minnesota's candidate to West Point.

== 1862 Dakota War ==
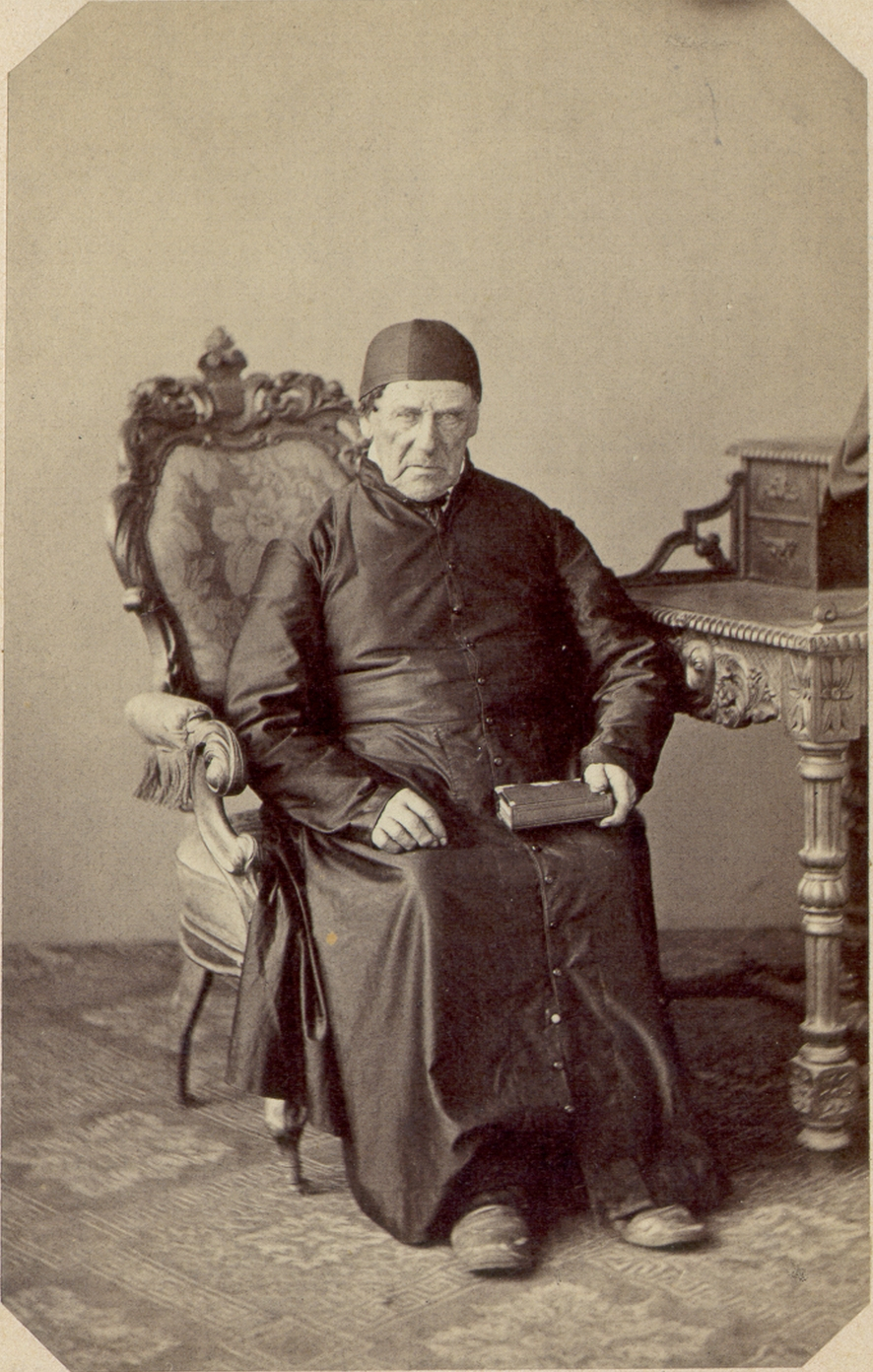
Fr. Francis Xavier Pierz, 1864

Very early in the Dakota War of 1862, Hole-in-the-Day spoke out in favor of joining forces with the Mdewakanton to drive European settlers from Minnesota. His threats to attack Fort Ripley were taken as serious. To encourage other Chippewa to join him, Hole-in-the-Day spread a rumor that the Union Army was drafting Ojibwe men to fight in the ongoing Civil War. Largely in reaction to this rumor and war mongering, a group of Leech Lake Pillager band burned the Indian Agency in Walker, Minnesota, took prisoners, and went to Crow Wing.

Hole-in-the-Day had his own major grievances with the Government, but they were not enough for him to actually join the Santee Dakota. Like the other leaders of the Chippewa he offered to fight the Santee Dakota. At a time of cronyism and the spoils system, the Chippewa and the Dakota people were both being victimized by the same rampant political corruption, extortion, and fraud tactics within the Department of Indian Affairs and the timing of their annuity payments were coincidentally close so the media linked their dis-satisfactions in an anti-Native American narrative. At the same time the media published story after story of the Chippewa support of the Government vs. the Dakota. Also at that time Crow Wing, Minnesota citizens used alcohol to get the bi-racial Chippewa intoxicated and sign papers as substitutes to fight in the Civil War. Hole-in the Day was furious when he learned of the subterfuge. Those men were bi-racial White Earth Chippewa. They formed a large portion of Co. G 9th Minnesota.

On 6 September, calls by Hole in the Day for the Ojibwe joining forces with Little Crow prompted Shaw-Bosh-Kung, head chief of the Mille Lacs band of Chippewa to take 700-750 warriors to Fort Ripley to volunteer to fight the Dakota and defend the garrison against Hole in the Day, along with the Sandy Lake band. William P. Dole, the Indian agent was at Fort Ripley, asked that they return to their reservation. He told them they would be informed if they were needed. However, war Chief Mou-Zoo-Mau-Nee (Iron-Walker) and 200 Mille Lacs warriors remained to protect the fort as did 100 from the Sandy Lake band. Both the Sandy Lake and Mille Lacs bands gained "non-removal" designations from the United States Federal Government as a result. Commissioner Dole gave the Mille Lacs band a document stating they could remain on their reservation for 1000 years for their actions.

When no one else could reach him, Roman Catholic priest and missionary Father Francis Xavier Pierz entered Hole in the Day's camp at great personal risk and convinced the Chief to call off the attempted uprising, to go with him to Crow Wing, and sign a peace agreement with the United States Federal Government.

== Volunteering for war ==
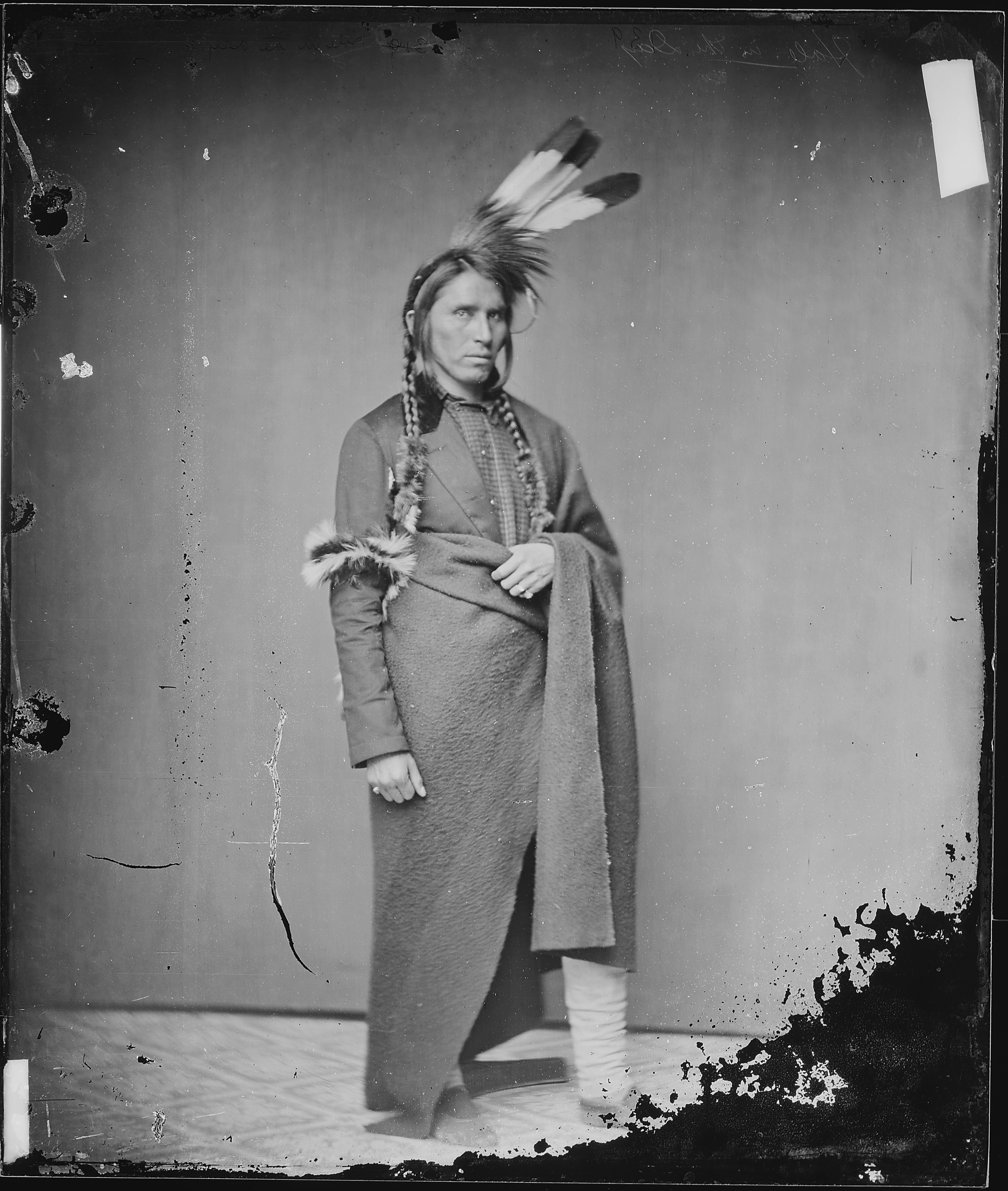
Hole-In-The-Day c. 1860-1865

On 15 September 1862, a council was held at the Crow Wing agency where 10 Chiefs of the Mississippi and Pillager Bands "offered their services, and if necessary their lives to punish the enemies of the white people, the Sioux..." Notable Chippewa leaders there were Chiefs Hole-in-the-Day, the Buffalo, and Flat-mouth.

On 22 September 40-50 Chippewa leaders of 22 bands arrived at the Minnesota State Capitol at the invitation of Gov. Ramsey thinking that their offer to fight the Dakota had been accepted. Major General Pope would not accept their service as a matter of "public policy." Nearly all of Minnesota's Chippewa wanted to help. Gov. Ramsey told the Chiefs that Lincoln was busy with the civil war, but if they were needed they would be informed. This Chippewa effort made the news in many cities. The next day the Mdewakanton surrendered at Camp Release. St Paul's two photo studios made images of many of Chippewa leaders that came to the Capitol in 1862, including Hole-in-the-Day's, that are now in the Minnesota Historical Society archives.

In late February 1863, 22 Chiefs waited in Chicago for Hole in the Day and the Indian Commissioner to go with them to see Lincoln. In April 1863 President Lincoln summoned the Mille Lacs and other Mississippi bands to Washington. He repeated what the Indian agent had told them at Fort Ripley, that the Mille Lacs Band could stay on their reservation for 1,000 years for their actions in support of the Government. At that time the Mille Lacs Bands and Sandy Lake Bands that participated were designated "non-removable" from their reservations. The boundaries of the Mille Lacs Reservation were made permanent.

In June 1863, Hole-in-the-Day offered Gen. Sibley 600 warriors for his expedition into Dakota Territory that Sibley turned down. Not dissuaded, in July Hole-in-the-Day offered his warriors to Major Hatch.

Hatch's Battalion or the Indian Battalion of Minnesota Volunteers was initially proposed to consist of 1000 Chippewa. Numerous papers published that Hole-in-the-Day thought Major Hatch was the correct man for Command.

The Chippewa offers to fight the Dakota had the interest and support of Gov. Ramsey as well as both US Senators Rice and Wilkinson. With Generals Pope and Sibley opposed, the Senators went higher to Secretary of War Stanton of the Department of War. In July, 1863 the Senators, united in their dislike for Pope, requested that Secretary of War Stanton authorize an independent mounted Indian Battalion of Minnesota Volunteers consisting of the 1000 Chippewa "auxiliaries". Gen. Pope in particular objected to the Chippewa Auxiliaries. Major Hatch meet with Chief Hole-in-the-Day in July when the Chief offered warriors to join Hatch. Some newspapers reported that Hole in the Day's offer to fight the Dakota had been accepted. Papers also stated that Chippewa warrior vs. Dakota warrior was "diamond on diamond" as combatants. Papers also felt Hole-in-the-Day could do more against the Dakota with 100 warriors that the "whites" could do with 1000 soldiers. Despite his efforts the Red Lake band held a low opinion of Hole in the Day and made it known at their September 1863 treaty signing. In 1865 newspapers reported that Hole-in-the-Day regretted not having been able to raise the Chippewa battalion for Major Hatch add fight the south.

== Assassination ==
On June 27, 1868, Hole-in-the-Day left his house at Gull Lake in a carriage driven by his trusted cousin and bodyguard Ojibwe. They were several miles from his home and were on the way to Washington, D.C., where the Chief intended to renegotiate the terms of the treaty regarding the Ojibwe migration to the new White Earth Indian Reservation. In the meantime, Hole-in-the-Day had issued orders that no Ojibwe were to move to White Earth until the U.S. Government actually built everything on the Reservation that had been promised in the previous Treaty.

Near the Crow Wing Agency, the Chief found the road obstructed by a group of twelve armed men from the Pillager Band. Standing up, the Chief called out in his native tongue, "You find me at a bad time! I am unarmed!" In response, he was shot with a double barrel shotgun. He fell to the ground where another attacker repeatedly stabbed him to make sure that he was dead, after which the assassins went to Hole-in-the-Day's house and looted it. Only Ojibwe's warning of the dangers of kidnapping a "White woman" prevented the Pillagers from abducting Ellen McCarthy; the youngest of the Chief's wives.

The murder of Hole-in-the-Day was an Indian on Indian crime on Indian land, and the United States Department of Justice had no authority to arrest or prosecute the offenders. Even so, a journey was made by Federal Indian Agent Joel Bassett and a posse of twenty-two United States Army soldiers from Fort Ripley to Leech Lake, where Chief Flat Mouth of the Pillager Band refused to permit the arrest of Chief Hole in the Day's assassins. Chief Flat Mouth's grounds were that, if he surrendered them, only the assassins would be prosecuted while whomever had hired them would go free.

At the request of his son Ignatius Hole-in-the-Day, Chief Hole-in-the-Day was buried by Fr. Francis Xavier Pierz, without a Requiem Mass, in the unconsecrated section of the Roman Catholic cemetery at Old Crow Wing. In an interview on White Earth during the 1920s, an elderly Catholic Ojibwe recalled that the men who had secretly hired the Pillager Band assassins pretended at the time to be very scandalized by Fr. Pierz's burial of the Chief.

In 1957 a local resident illegally dug up the grave looking for valuable artifacts and discovered that there was no body. According to Ojibwe author and historian Anton Treuer, the oral tradition passed down among Hole-in-the-Day's extended family is that the Chief's non-Catholic relatives objected to Ignatius' choice of burial, secretly dug up and removed the Chief's body, and reburied him according to traditional Ojibwe rites at a secret location near the town of White Earth.

Hole-in-the-Day's murder was national news, and theories about its cause were many: personal jealousy, retribution for his decades-long claim to be head chief of all the Ojibwe, retaliation for the attacks he fomented in 1862, or retribution for his recent vows to "use the butcher knife" to keep certain mixed-blood Ojibwes, or Métis, off of the White Earth Reservation and to have them dropped from the Federal annuity rolls.

For decades, the reasons for the Chief's murder remained a mystery. The names of the assassins were known, however no one was ever charged with the murder. In 1911, the surviving assassins testified and confirmed longstanding suspicions that the 1868 murder of Chief Hole-in-the-Day had been a contract killing: they had been hired by a group of mobbed up Métis businessmen, fur traders, and illegal whiskey peddlers led by Allan Morrison and Clement Hudon Beaulieu, the Democratic Party's political boss of the region of Minnesota where Crow Wing was located. While negotiating with a previous group of hired gunmen, Beaulieu had said that Hole-in-the-Day was "like a great big log" and, if he was not killed, it would be impossible for Beaulieu and his confederates to get past him.

According to Anton Treuer, all of the assassins had come by 1911 to regret their actions. Beaulieu and his confederates had kept none of the promises of lavish payment made to the assassins. Furthermore, Beaulieu, the other co-conspirators, and their families had then taken control of the Government, law enforcement, and business community of the White Earth Indian Reservation. Similarly to both the rackrenting Anglo-Irish landlords of the same era and the many other robber barons like them during America's Gilded Age, Beaulieu and the other conspirators then abused the power of their positions to enrich themselves and their families, while systematically defrauding and impoverishing everyone else on White Earth.

In 1911, the surviving assassins testified about their involvement because they had grown aware not only of Chief Hole-in-the-Day's ability to force the United States Federal Government to keep its promises to the Chippewa, but also of the Chief's ability to keep Clement Beaulieu and his confederates in check.

Anton Treuer has described the Chief's assassination as a watershed moment in the history of the Ojibwe people and argues that the aftermath of the Chief's murder was a major factor in the continuing language loss and the ongoing collapse of Ojibwe culture.

== Others with the same name ==
Besides Hole-in-the-Day the Elder and Hole-in-the-Day II or the Younger, there were at least two other prominent Minnesota Ojibwe of the 1800s named Hole-in-the-Day. One Hole-in-the-Day from Red Lake was involved in the Nelson Act of 1889. Another Hole-in-the-Day from Leech Lake played a leading role in 1898 in the nation's last Indian battle, the Battle of Sugar Point. Hole-in-the-Day II had two sons that used his name, Ignatius Hole-in-the Day and Joseph Hole-in-the-Day. Joseph was born after his father's death. His mother was the Caucasian his father took as a wife.
