= Godič =

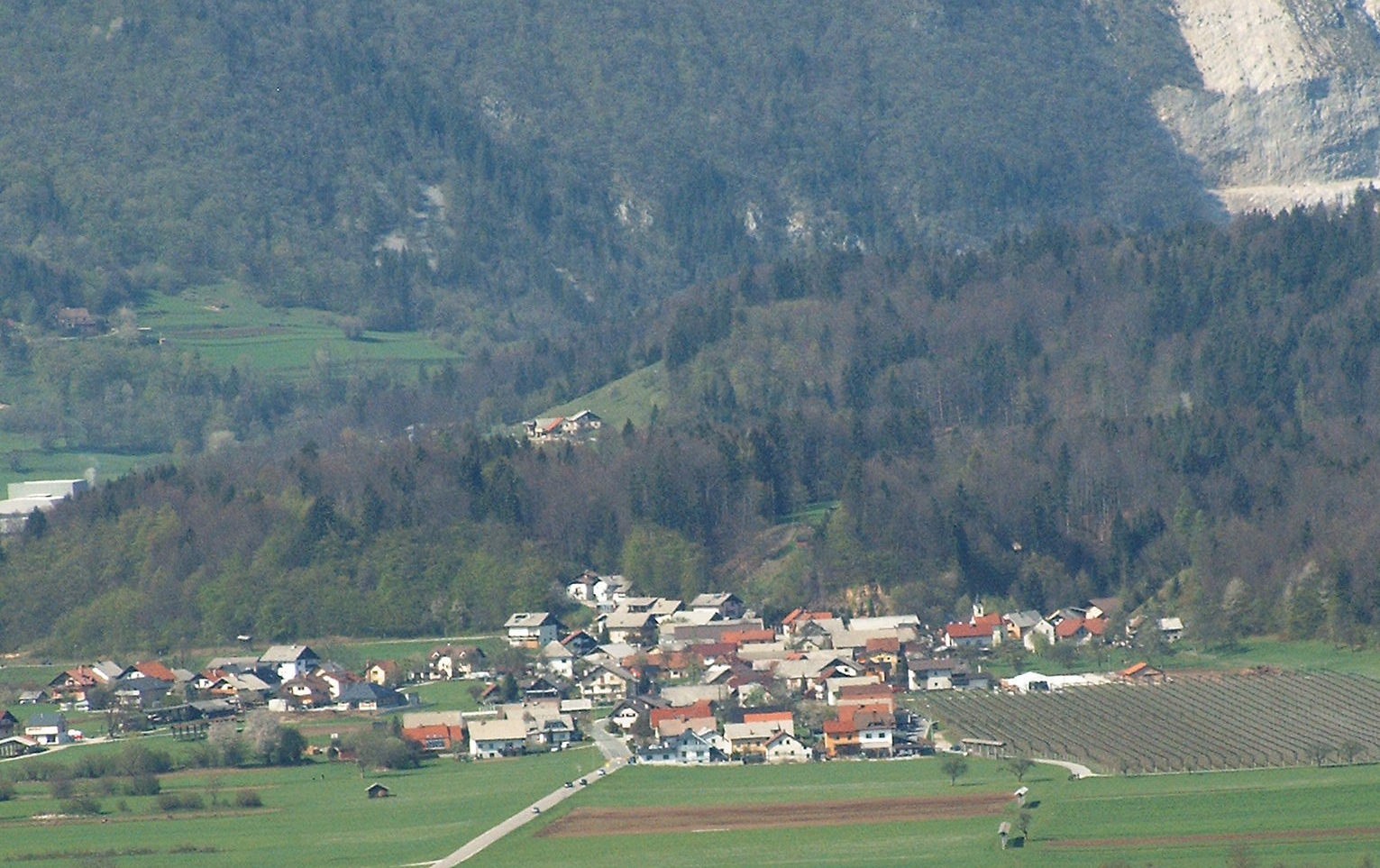
- Godič from the south

- Location in Slovenia
- Coordinates: 46°15′43.06″N 14°36′21.74″E
- Country: Slovenia
- Traditional region: Upper Carniola
- Statistical region: Central Slovenia
- Municipality: Kamnik
- Elevation: 655 m (2,149 ft)

Population (2002)
  - Total: 655

Godič (pronounced [ɡɔˈditʃ]; German: Goditsch) is a village on the left bank of the Kamnik Bistrica River in the Municipality of Kamnik in the Upper Carniola region of Slovenia.

== Name ==
Godič was first attested in written sources in 1426 as Goditsch (and as Godicz in 1447). The name is derived from the plural form *Godiči, from the patronymic Godič based on a name such as *Godislavъ, *Godimirъ, etc. The name thus means 'place where Godič and his people live.' In the past the German name was Goditsch.

== Cultural heritage ==
In 1993 the Archaeological Section of the National Museum of Slovenia excavated a Roman cave shrine in a local rock shelter known as Pod Gričo. A number of votive offerings, coins, potshards, and animal bones were found at the site.

== Notable people ==
Notable people that were born or lived in Godič include:

- Jurij Jan (1821–1900), priest and cultural activist in San Dorligo della Valle
- Štefan Kališnik (1929–2004), playwright
- Francis Xavier Pierz (1785–1880), missionary in North America and poet
