= William P. Dole =

American politician (1811–1889)

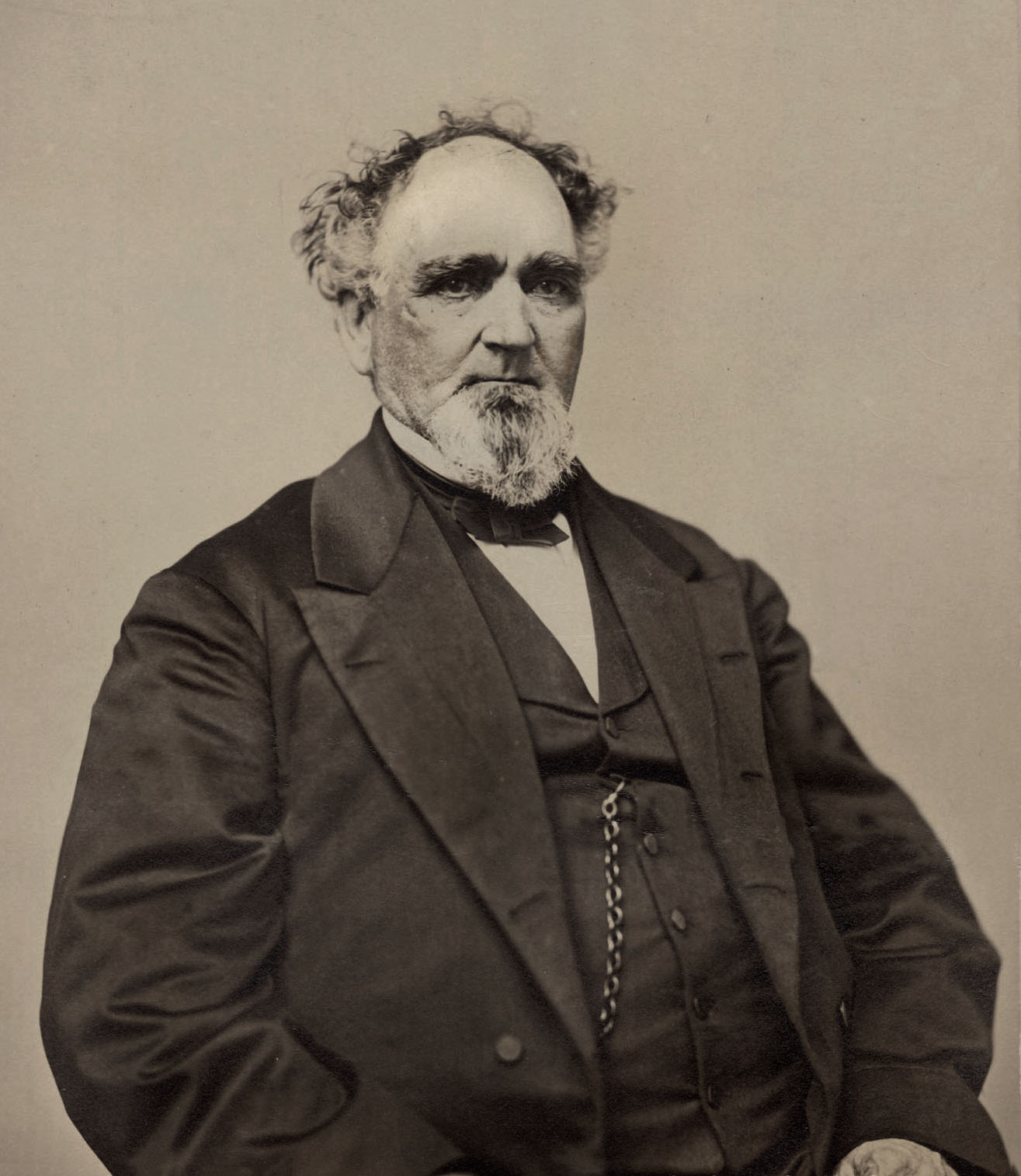
- Dole, c. 1860s

12th Commissioner of Indian Affairs
- In office March 12, 1861 – July 5, 1865
- Preceded by: Alfred B. Greenwood
- Succeeded by: Dennis N. Cooley

Personal details
- Born: December 3, 1811 Danville, Vermont, US
- Died: September 30, 1889 (aged 77) Washington, D.C., US
- Resting place: Paris, Illinois
- Spouse: Susannah Rush (m. 1833–1838) Jane Bryson (m. 1839–1860) Elizabeth (Gordon) Allis (m. 1861–1889)
- Children: 2

William Palmer Dole (December 3, 1811 – September 30, 1889) was an American politician who served as the Commissioner of Indian Affairs from 1861 to 1865. Born in Danville, Vermont, he moved to Ohio at a young age before attending school near Terre Haute, Indiana. After leaving home, he worked as a grocer and pork packer in Clinton, Indiana, making trips via flatboat to sell produce along the Mississippi. In 1838, he was elected to the Indiana House of Representatives as a Whig. Six years later he was elected to the state senate, and served in this role until 1851. After leaving the Indiana Congress, he returned to merchant work in Paris, Illinois, and joined the nascent Republican Party. He served as a delegate at the 1860 Republican National Convention in Chicago, and helped to negotiate support for Abraham Lincoln from the Pennsylvania and Indiana delegations, where it was agreed that he would be appointed as Commissioner of Indian Affairs. He received a number of recommendations from Indiana and Illinois politicians, and was appointed by Lincoln following his election.

Dole, like Lincoln, had very little experience with Native Americans. As commissioner, the Office of Indian Affairs largely followed its current course. Dole was a proponent of dividing communally-held reservation land into private plots via the allotment system, seeing it as a way to assimilate Native American nations into American society, with the eventual goal of termination of the reservation system. Dole's efforts to expand treaty negotiations to California was rejected by Congress, while attempts to negotiate with plains tribes were blocked by regional military commanders. Dole faced heavy political backlash following the 1864 Sand Creek massacre, with many attributing corruption and incompetence with the office to his leadership. Following the assassination of Abraham Lincoln, President Andrew Johnson considered Dole a political liability, and replaced him as commissioner with Dennis N. Cooley. Dole retired from politics after leaving federal office, and died in Washington in 1889.

== Early life and career ==
William Palmer Dole was born in Danville, Vermont on December 3, 1811, (Note: The Indiana State Library gives his birthday as December 9.) to Enoch and Harriet Dexter Dole, and was taken to his parents' home in New Hampshire when he was a few months old. In 1813, the family moved to Bedford, New Hampshire, and then to Hamilton, Ohio in 1818. In 1821, they settled down at a homestead at Coleman's Grove, two miles north of Terre Haute, Indiana, where Dole attended school. He would later recount seeing a group of Native Americans swimming while visiting a camp at Fort Harrison; this is the only recorded instance of him encountering Native Americans prior to his service as Commissioner of Indian Affairs.

Having no interest in farming, he left home in 1831 to work as a grocer in Clinton, Indiana. In addition to his dry goods and grocery store, he worked as a pork packer. He made a series of eight flatboat trips to New Orleans during this period, traveling down the Wabash, Ohio, and Mississippi rivers, selling produce "at all the points from Memphis to New Orleans."

Dole married Susannah Rush on February 15, 1833. They had two children: a daughter named Persis around 1836, and a son named William around 1838. Susannah died soon afterwards, and Dole married her cousin Jane Bryson sometime before 1840.

=== Early political career ===
In 1838, Dole was elected to the Indiana House of Representatives as a Whig, one of two representatives from Vermillion County. He was elected to the Indiana Senate in 1844, serving as a state senator until 1851. He was known for his humor as a politician; when Governor James Whitcomb made a speech calling on legislators to do what God would want done, Dole responded with a motion to send the matter to the clergy for further action. A letter he sent to his wife in 1843 warned her not to visit Indianapolis without warning, stating "I wish to be on my guard and not be caught in mischief."

Dole moved to Paris, Illinois around 1854, following the extension of railroads into eastern Illinois, where he partnered with William Kile to open a dry goods store named Kile and Dole. While in Illinois, he became involved with the early Republican Party. He served as a delegate to the 1860 Republican National Convention in Chicago, where he worked alongside David Davis to negotiate support for Abraham Lincoln from the Pennsylvania and Indiana delegations. It was negotiated with the Indiana delegation that Hoosier Caleb Blood Smith would be appointed as Secretary of the Interior in exchange for Dole's appointment as Commissioner of Indian Affairs. Dole received a number of letters of recommendation from Indiana and Illinois politicians, leading Lincoln to send his nomination to the Senate on March 8, 1861. He was confirmed on March 12.

== Commissioner of Indian Affairs ==
=== Policy ===
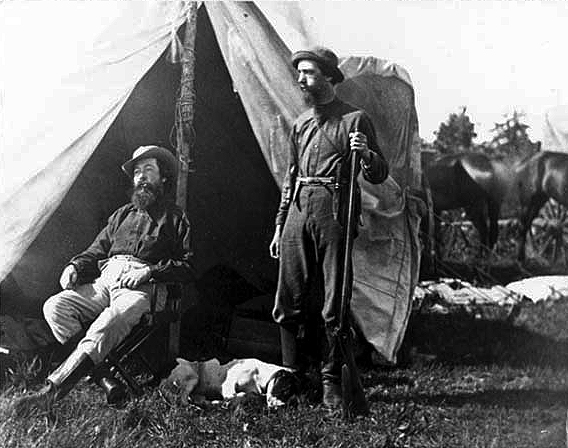
Dole (seated) and John George Nicolay at camp in Big Lake, Minnesota, 1862

Lincoln, like Dole, had very little previous interaction with Native Americans. He did not see combat during his service in the Black Hawk War, and lived in a region with very few remaining Native Americans, who were depopulated due to colonization and white settlement. During his debates with Stephen Douglas, Lincoln stated that the basic rights outlined in the declaration of Independence applied to Black and Native American peoples. After taking office, he came to regard the treaty system as a protectionist measure against white land speculation.

Possibly due to his lack of experience, Lincoln paid little attention to native affairs, and often deferred to Dole and the Office of Indian Affairs during his presidency. During Dole's commission, the existing assimilationist goals of the agency were maintained. He was a proponent of the allotment system, dividing the communally-held reservation land into various private lots assigned to the members of the tribe; this was seen as a measure to encourage the assimilation and "civilization" of native peoples, while additionally allowing settlers and speculators to purchase excess land which fell outside of any particular allotment. Allotment of reservation land was first used following the War of 1812, but became widespread during the 1830s and 1840s. Dole wrote in the agency's 1863 annual report that allotment was necessary to promote "the ideas of self-reliance and individual effort."

Full land title to the allotments was only occasionally extended under Dole's administration, reserved to natives "sufficiently intelligent and prudent to control their affairs and interests". Dole believed that these successful examples of Native land ownership would ease opposition to allotment among other tribes. He was also a major proponent of off-reservation day schools focused on instruction in manual labor tasks. He described academic instruction as "useless to an Indian if he has not the habits of industry with it". Dole believed that such policies would be pursued with the future goal of the termination of the reservations, suspending the federal government's administration of the tribes and incorporating natives as full citizens. By beginning widespread negotiation of treaties with western tribes and the shifting of priorities towards welfare programs in lieu of the prior focus on securing colonial land claims, he was able to forestall a major conflict while the American military was preoccupied during the early phases of the Civil War. He obtained grants to provide for Native refugees who had been driven from the Indian Territory during the war. The Dakota Uprising of 1862 occurred during his tenure, but did not have an outsized influence on the Union war effort.

Dole's efforts to expand the treaty system to California was rejected by Congress. During the California genocide, native tribes had been largely confined to small temporary reservations. Opponents justified an absence of treaty rights in the Mexican Cession through a corresponding lack of recognition from the Spanish Empire during its colonization of the region. Congress ultimately would not approve treaty negotiations with the California tribes, although they were moved onto reservations under a reorganized California Superintendency of Indian Affairs.

=== Incidents ===
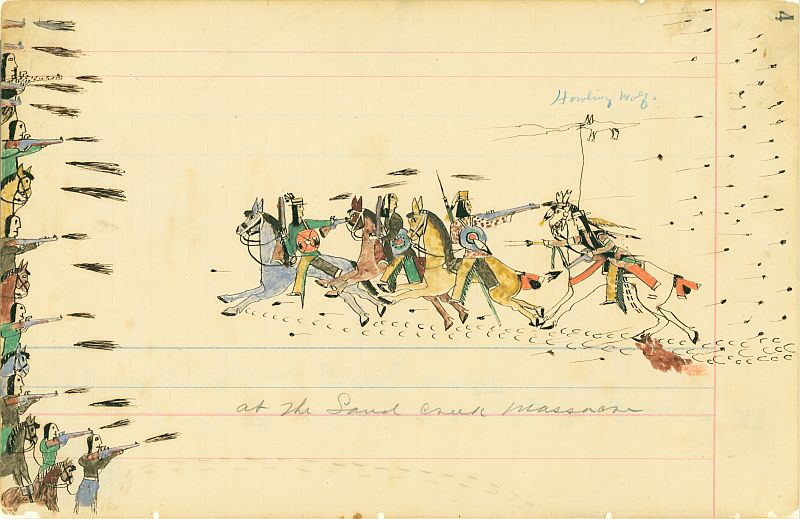
Ledger art depiction of the Sand Creek Massacre by eyewitness Howling Wolf

Dole faced heavy criticism following the November 1864 Sand Creek massacre, in which a unit of United States Volunteers massacred large numbers of encamped Cheyenne and Arapaho, mainly women and children. He was labeled by the military as an idealist and overly accommodating towards native tribes, while others saw him as unnecessarily cruel in his policy. He was investigated for the appointment of unfit agents to the agency, including friends and family members. Dole's attempts to negotiate treaties and implement congressional appropriations to native tribes were blocked by regional military commanders during the later period of his time in office. Generals such as Grenville M. Dodge and James Henry Carleton rejected Dole's efforts to negotiate with hostile tribes, considering only military force sufficient to impose submission to federal control.

Dole continued as commissioner for several months following the assassination of Abraham Lincoln. The newly appointed Secretary of the Interior James Harlan was particularly hostile to Dole, characterizing the Office of Indian Affairs as a "pack of thieves". President Andrew Johnson came to see Dole as a controversial political liability. Dole, knowing of Johnson's opposition, resigned on July 5, 1865. Johnson replaced him with bureaucrat Dennis N. Cooley, a close political associate of Harlan, four days later.

== Later life and death ==
Dole retired from politics after his term as Commissioner. The 1867 Doolittle Report attributed much of the ill-treatment of Native American tribes during the Civil War to Dole, alleging inefficiency and corruption. Biographer Harry Kelsey described the report as having "unfairly blackened" Dole's reputation. He continued to live in Washington, D.C., and died there on September 30, 1889. He was buried in Paris, Illinois.

== Notes ==
=== Bibliography ===
- Britten, T. A. (2016). "Abraham Lincoln as Great Father: A Look at Federal Indian Policy, 1861–1865". American Indian Culture and Research Journal. 40 (3): 103–122. doi:10.17953/aicrj.40.3.britten.
- Carmony, Donald F.; Gray, Marion H. (1971). "William P. Dole: Wabash Valley Merchant and Flatboatman". Indiana Magazine of History. 67 (4): 335–363. JSTOR 27789774.
- Davis, Charles (February 2014). "Kile and Dole: And Their Wabash & Erie Canal Connection" (PDF). The Hoosier Packet. 13 (2). Canal Society of Indiana.
- Hofsommer, Donovan L. (Fall 1973). "William Palmer Dale, Commissioner of Indian Affairs, 1861–1865". Lincoln Herald. 75 (3).
- Kelsey, Harry (1979). "William P. Dole (1861–1865)". In Kvasnicka, Robert M.; Viola, Herman J. (eds.). The Commissioners of Indian Affairs, 1824–1977. Lincoln: University of Nebraska Press. ISBN 978-0-8032-2700-2.
- Roberts, Gary L. (1979). "Dennis Nelson Coolley (1865–1866)". In Kvasnicka, Robert M.; Viola, Herman J. (eds.). The Commissioners of Indian Affairs, 1824–1977. Lincoln: University of Nebraska Press. ISBN 978-0-8032-2700-2.
- Kelsey, Harry (Fall 1975). "Abraham Lincoln and American Indian Policy". Lincoln Herald. 77 (3).

=== Further reading ===
- Kelsey, Harry (July 1971). "William P. Dole and Mr. Lincoln's Indian Policy". Journal of the West. 10 (3).
- Danziger, Edmund Jefferson (1974). Indians and Bureaucrats: Administering the Reservation Policy During the Civil War. Urbana: University of Illinois Press. ISBN 9780252003141. OCLC 1009122.
