= Assumption Chapel =

Grasshopper Chapel, 1877 Roman Catholic church in Minnesota

Coordinates: 45°27′21″N 94°24′51″W

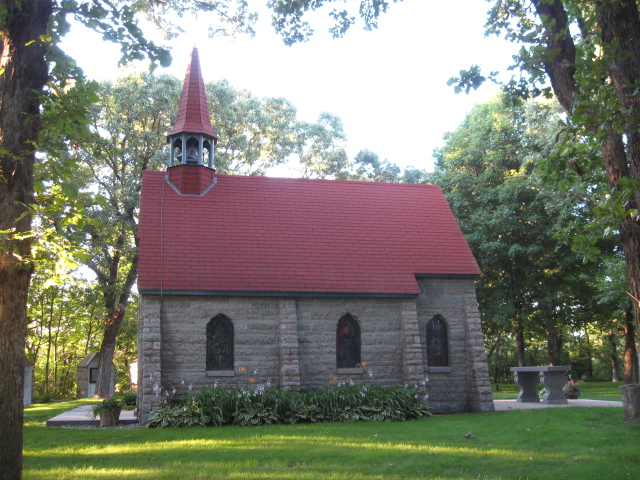
Assumption Chapel

Assumption Chapel, also known as the Grasshopper Chapel, is a Roman Catholic Marian shrine, "Calvary Hill" (German: Kalvarienberg), and pilgrimage chapel (German: Wallfahrtsort) (German: Gnadenkapelle). The shrine stands upon one of the tallest hills in Stearns County, and which is known locally as (German: Marienberg), meaning "Mary's Mountain", on the outskirts of Cold Spring, Minnesota. The chapel stands in a region of Minnesota largely settled in the 1850s by German-American Catholics who were invited to the area by Slovenian-American missionary Fr. Francis Xavier Pierz and which remained, until shortly before the Second World War, a major center for the speaking of the German language in the United States.

Although inspired by thousand-year-old traditions carried from Southern Germany to central Minnesota by its peasant-pioneers, the Assumption Chapel, similar to the St. Boniface pilgrimage shrine in nearby St. Augusta, was constructed in 1877, as a desperate plea for heavenly intercession against the Rocky Mountain locusts; a species of giant grasshopper whose plagues devastated the region between 1856 and 1877. As many local peasant pioneers had emigrated from regions of southern Germany that had been evangelized by Hiberno-Scottish missionaries from the Celtic Church, customs associated with both shrines bear close similarities to traditional Breton pardons or to the pattern days of Gaelic Ireland.

The petition was considered to have been successful at the time and there has not been another Rocky Mountain locust plague in Minnesota since 1877. Moreover, the last documented sighting of live Rocky Mountain locusts in the wild took place in southern Canada in 1902. In 2014, the species of insects which was once numerous enough to block out the sunlight and reduce farm families throughout North America to starvation was formally declared extinct by the International Union for Conservation of Nature.

== Background ==
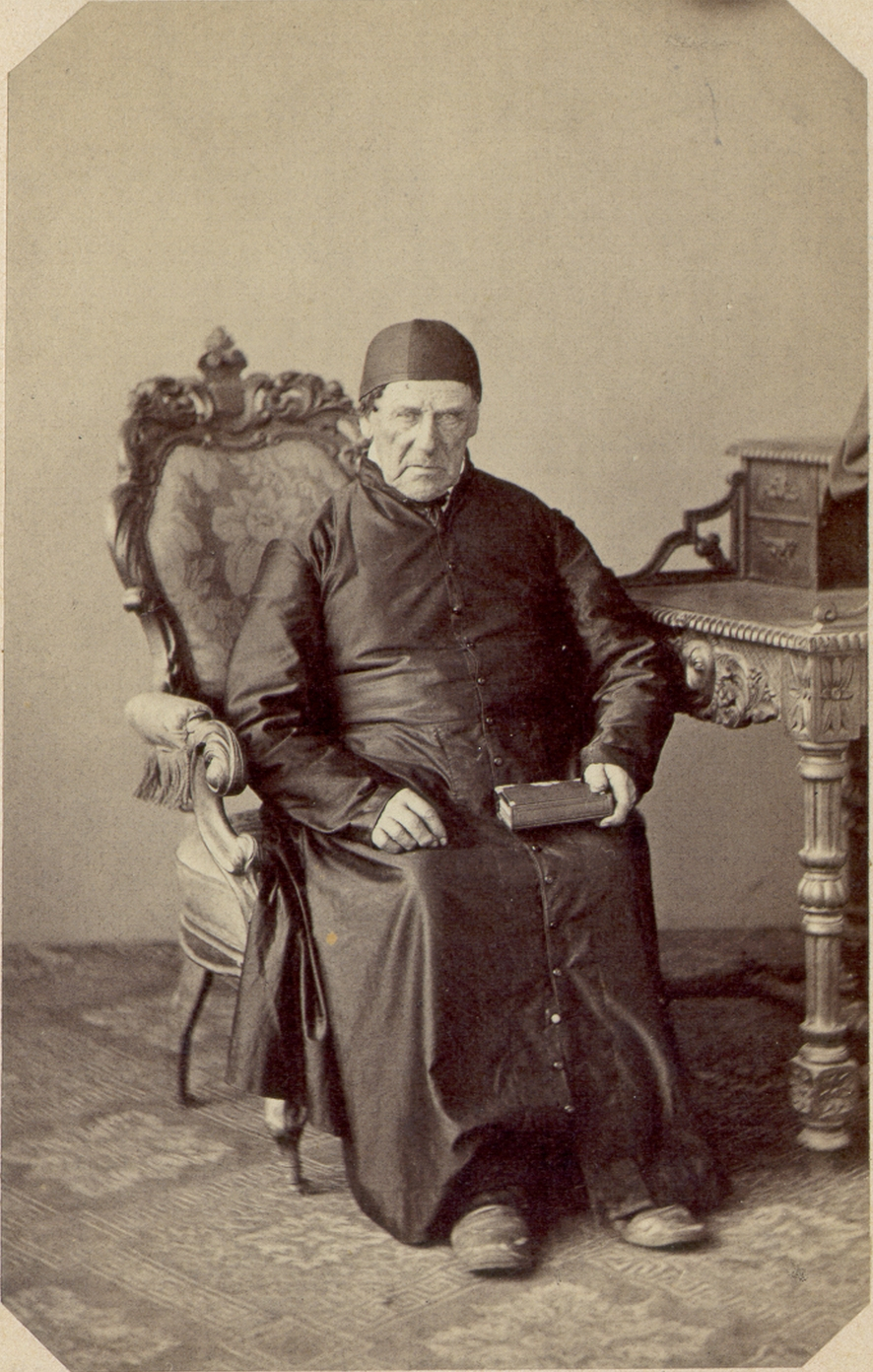
Fr. Francis Xavier Pierz, 1864

Writing in 1997, Jewish-American historian of America's religious architecture Marilyn J. Chiat described the early history of the region as follows, "Father Francis X. Pierz, a missionary to Indians in central Minnesota, published a series of articles in 1851 in German Catholic newspapers advocating Catholic settlement in central Minnesota. Large numbers of immigrants, mainly German, but also Slovenian and Polish, responded. Over 20 parishes where formed in what is now Stearns County, each centered on a church-oriented hamlet. As the farmers prospered, the small frame churches were replaced by more substantial buildings of brick or stone such as St. Mary, Help of Christians, a Gothic Revival stone structure built in 1873. Stearns County retains in its German character and is still home to one of the largest rural Catholic populations in Anglo-America."

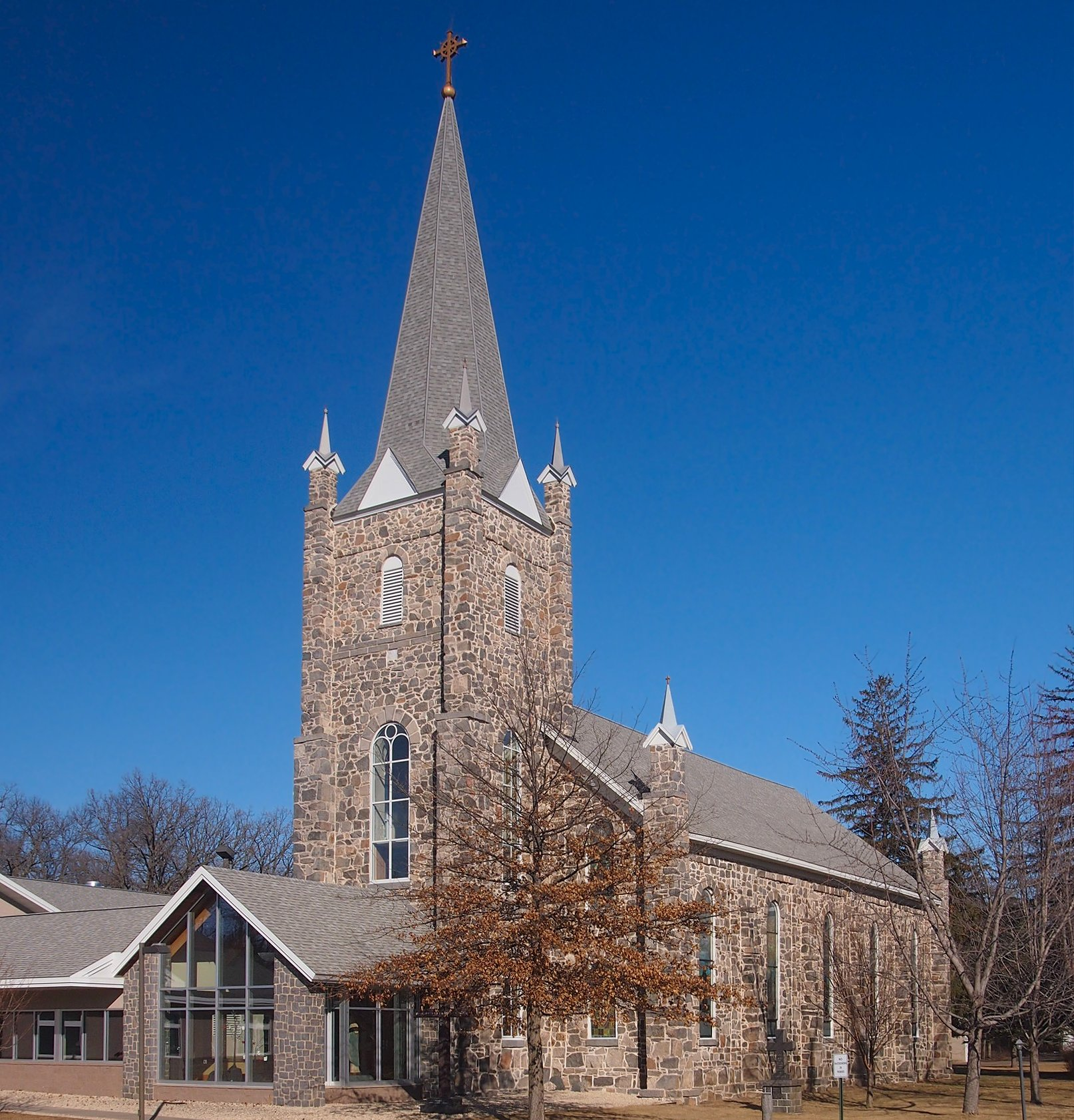
St. Mary Help of Christians Church, St. Augusta, Minnesota.

Furthermore, according to Kathleen Neils Conzen, "Stearns County Germans early established daughter settlements at West Union in Todd County, Millerville in Douglas County, and Pierz in Morrison County, later flooded into North Dakota (where 'Stearns County German' remains a recognized ethnicity today), and in 1905 negotiated with the Canadian authorities to establish the St. Peter Colony in north-central Saskatchewan."

The first Assumption Chapel was known as (German: Maria-Hilf), meaning "Mary, Help of Christians", and was built atop the same hill, which is locally known as (German: Marienberg), meaning "Mary's Mountain". At the time of its original construction in 1877, much of the Midwest was suffering from a four year long Rocky Mountain locust plague. At the same time, however, the construction of the chapel was based on a tradition stretching back much earlier.

== 1856–1857 plague ==
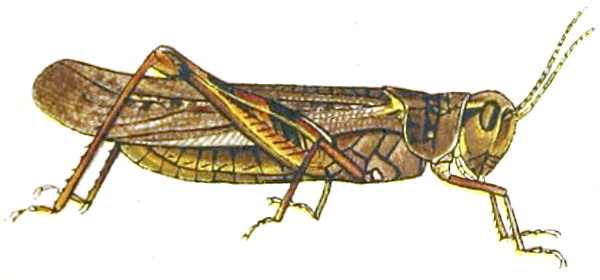
A 1902 scientific illustration of the Rocky Mountain locust.

According to Fr. Bruno Riss (1829–1900), a Benedictine missionary priest from Augsburg, in the Kingdom of Bavaria, the first Rocky Mountain locust plague to strike Central Minnesota began on 15 August 1856, during the preaching of a mission for the Feast of the Assumption by Father Francis Xavier Weninger inside the newly erected log chapel in St. Joseph, Minnesota; following the lifting of a personal interdict imposed against that community by Bishop Joseph Crétin in May 1856. The Rocky Mountain locusts darkened the sky and pounded upon the rooftop of the chapel so incredibly loud that they were mistaken for a thunder and hailstorm. Only after the mission did the real reason for the "storm" become apparent, and the clouds of "hoppers" swiftly devoured both the crops and much of the seed grain, which left the newly arrived German-American Catholic settlers of the region destitute.

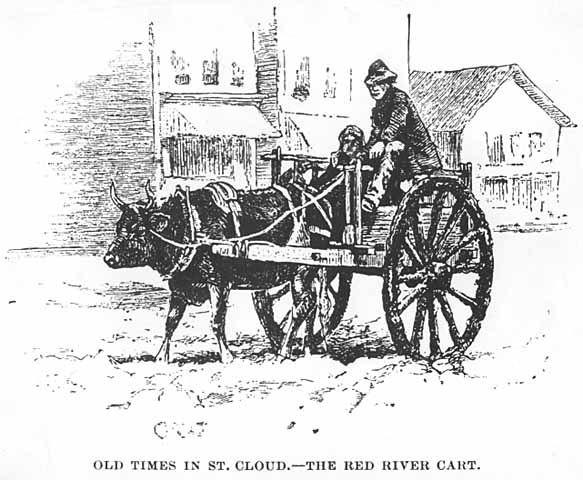
Red River ox-cart at Saint Cloud, 1887

According to Father Bruno Riss, "This small, voracious yet invincible monster had in a short time devastated all that grows and blooms upon the face of the earth. Within about 2 or 3 days the fields presented the appearance of being newly plowed. Then an indescribable misery entered the homes of the settlers of Stearns County. The entire harvest was a dead loss for those settlers who had taken their abodes in this region during the previous year: those, of course, who had settled during the year of the famine had no crops to lose, as they had not planted any. The first terrible winter was at hand the victuals that remained were soon consumed, prices rose enormously, because the nearest market was at St. Paul, and it required a full week to make a trip with an ox-team. Still, hope did not die."

Although the grasshoppers were believed to have been killed off by the 1856-1857 winter and seed wheat stood at $2 per bushel, it became apparent during the spring planting in 1857 that the locusts had simply laid their eggs in the furrows. When the warmth of the sun hatched the eggs, the results were even more catastrophic for the local population than the events of the previous year, as the grasshoppers, "suffered nothing to grow, except peas."

According to Fr. Bruno Riss, "They found their way into the houses and destroyed whatever clothing they could reach. In the church not a shred of clothing could remain unexposed, everything was locked up in presses. Even the priest at the altar was not secure against their attacks: before Mass the hoppers had to be swept off the altar. The priest had to vest hastily, place the altar clothes upon the altar and be very careful to keep the Sacred Host covered with the Paten, and at the Elevation to leave the palla upon the chalice. During Mass the altar-boys were kept busy driving away the insolent insects with whips from the vestments of the priest."

According to Father Bruno Riss, George Berger (1823-1897), a St. Joseph homesteader from Oberschneiding, in the Kingdom of Bavaria, raised the question, in a typically self-deprecating example of Stearns County German humor, after Mass one Sunday, "Why does God afflict us with grasshoppers?" Herr Berger then answered his own question, "in his own humorous way", and explained, "God saw that when we lived in the States from which we emigrated, we were good for nothing and wanted to cure us without harming our neighbors and therefore he led us to this place and the grasshoppers after us and now, I hope, we are all cured."

Fr. Bruno Riss was almost certainly referring to elderly Rockville pioneer homesteader Michael Hanson, Sr., an immigrant from the Luxembourgish-speaking but Prussian-ruled village of Obersgegen and combat veteran of the French Imperial Army who had lost a leg to enemy fire during the Napoleonic Wars, when he wrote about, "an old man [who] dwelled with several of his children on a farm" near St. James Church in Jacob's Prairie. According to Fr. Bruno, "Spring of '57 came: the young brood of grasshoppers crept to the surface, but the old man ordered his sons to sow wheat and oats." His sons replied, "Father, this is in vain; the hoppers will not let anything grow. Let us save the seed."

The old man replied, "No, boys, we will do our part and plant as usual. But let me tell you this: if God gives us a harvest, we shall give one third to God and the Church, the second third will be for the poor, while for ourselves we will reserve the balance. Now if the good God wishes to accept of our gift He will permit this grain to grow."

According to Fr. Bruno, "And so it happened. It seemed as though the hoppers could not find this farm. The yield about one half of a usual harvest, while farmers in the vicinity has no crops whatever. Agreeable to his promise, he delivered to me two thirds of the entire yield for distribution. How I was edified and touched by the faith of this man. Nor did he make display of his charity, - all was done on the quiet."

By May 1857, conditions among the settlers had deteriorated to the point that the four Benedictine priests responsible for the region discussed the situation together and proposed to their parishioners the idea of vowing to make a biannual religious procession and pilgrimage (German: Bittgang) in perpetuity if the locust plague were lifted. The Benedictines had recalled two Saints, early missionaries who spearheaded the Christianization of the pagan Germanic tribes in what later became the Diocese of Augsburg during a time when what is now the Germanosphere was very similar to the Wild West, who both had a well established reputation for intercession during similar plagues of vermin in Southern Germany. For this reason, the processions were scheduled for July 4th, the Feast of Saint Ulrich of Augsburg, and September 6th, the Feast of Saint Magnus of Füssen. Immediately after the proposal was accepted and a solemn vow was made by the parish missions at St. Cloud, St. Augusta, St. Joseph, Jacobs Prairie, and Richmond, a strong northwest wind blew the locusts out of the region. Even though local settlers had to wait another fourteen months for the next harvest to end local destitution, the religious processions began almost immediately.

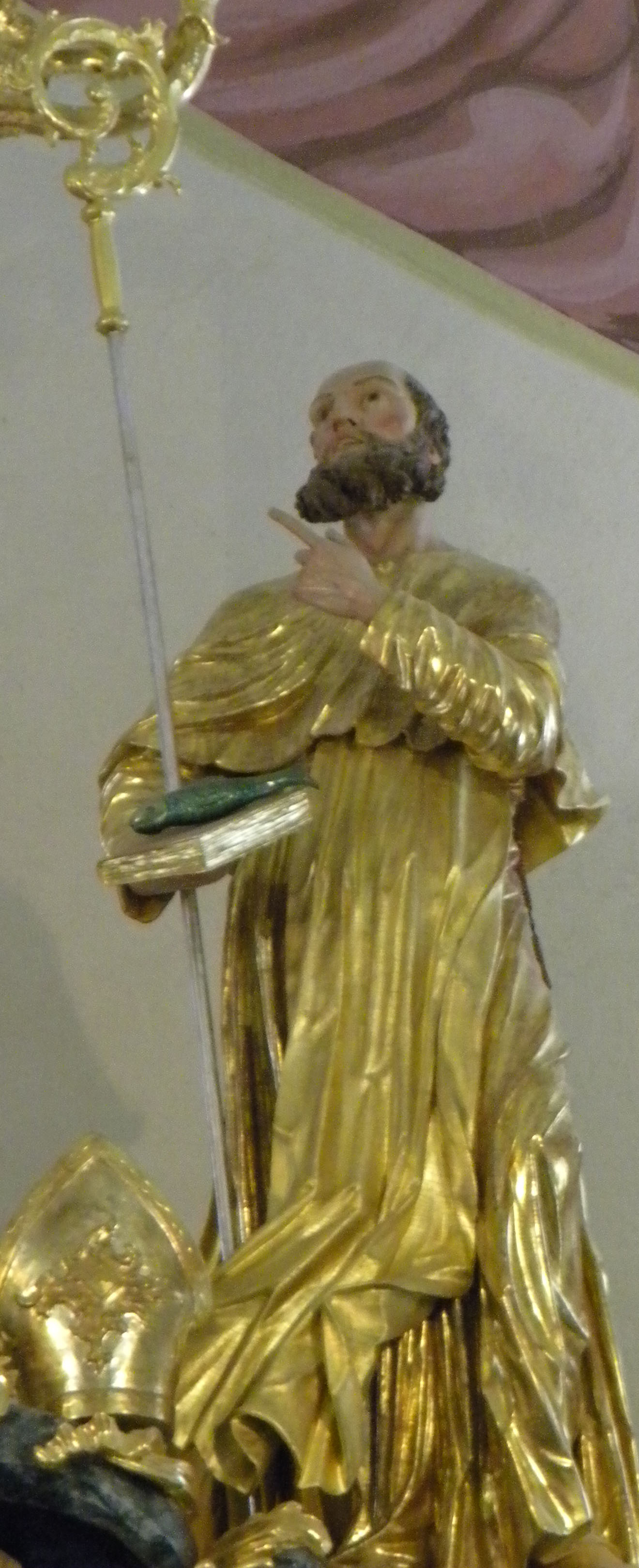
Statue of St. Ulrich of Augsburg inside the parish church in Gora Oljka, Slovenia.

For the first pilgrimage, on the next Feast Day of St. Ulrich of Augsburg on 4 July 1857, St. James's Roman Catholic Church in Jacobs Prairie was chosen as the objective. The pilgrims from St. Augusta and St. Cloud crossed the Sauk River at "Waite's Crossing" and were met on the other side by the pilgrims from Richmond and other nearby communities. The Tridentine Mass was then offered under the open sky before the pilgrimage continued to its objective.

Meanwhile, the writer of a letter from Stearns County to Der Wahrheitsfreund in Cincinnati, Ohio, which was published on July 2, 1857, commented, "Truly, one feels that they have been transported back to Germany when they see the beautiful customs of the Fatherland, votive and other processions, which proceed over fields and meadows". The same writer continued, "Some of the Yankees witnessed the event and stared, as they had never seen this, and its meaning was strange to them. It must be said in praise of them that in such circumstances they were well-behaved and not once tried to disturb the atmosphere."

Statue of St. Magnus of Füssen outside the Basilica of St Mang in Füssen, Bavaria.

An eyewitness account of the annual pilgrimage upon the Feast of St. Magnus of Füssen was also published in Der Wahrheitsfreund on September 23, 1858. According to Stephen Gross, "The reporter described the congregation at St. Joseph meeting at 6:00 A.M. and beginning an hour later to walk the eight miles to Jacobs Prairie. Two miles from their destination they were met by the parishioners from Jacobs Prairie, who accompanied the procession back to the church. Mass was held outside at the base of a huge mission cross, decorated with flowers and holy pictures. The priest in his sermon expressed his joy at the unity and love, which prevailed in the parishes, and his wish that it would always remain so."

The crosses erected outside pioneer churches in the area after the completion of similar processions and parish missions, or marking the future locations of parish churches, always bore the maxim, (German: Wer ausharrt bis ans End, der wird selig.") ("Blessed is he who perseveres to the end.")

Fr. Bruno Riss later recalled, however, "In subsequent years, I am informed that the custom of observing these processions was abandoned, but a return of the ancient enemy revived the former fervor."

According to Stephen Gross, however, this is not entirely accurate. While the Feast Day of St. Ulrich of Augsburg was swiftly displaced by America's Independence Day, this was not the case with St. Magnus of Füssen. The Hiberno-Scottish missionary St. Magnus, the founder of St. Mang's Abbey, Füssen who is traditionally known as the "Apostle of the Allgäu", continued to be widely venerated in Stearns County as a patron of good harvests and as the protector against lightning, hail, and plagues of vermin. Furthermore, his Feast Day on September 6 continued to be celebrated until well into the 1870s, both in and around Jacobs Prairie, as, "Grasshopper Day."

== 1870s plague ==
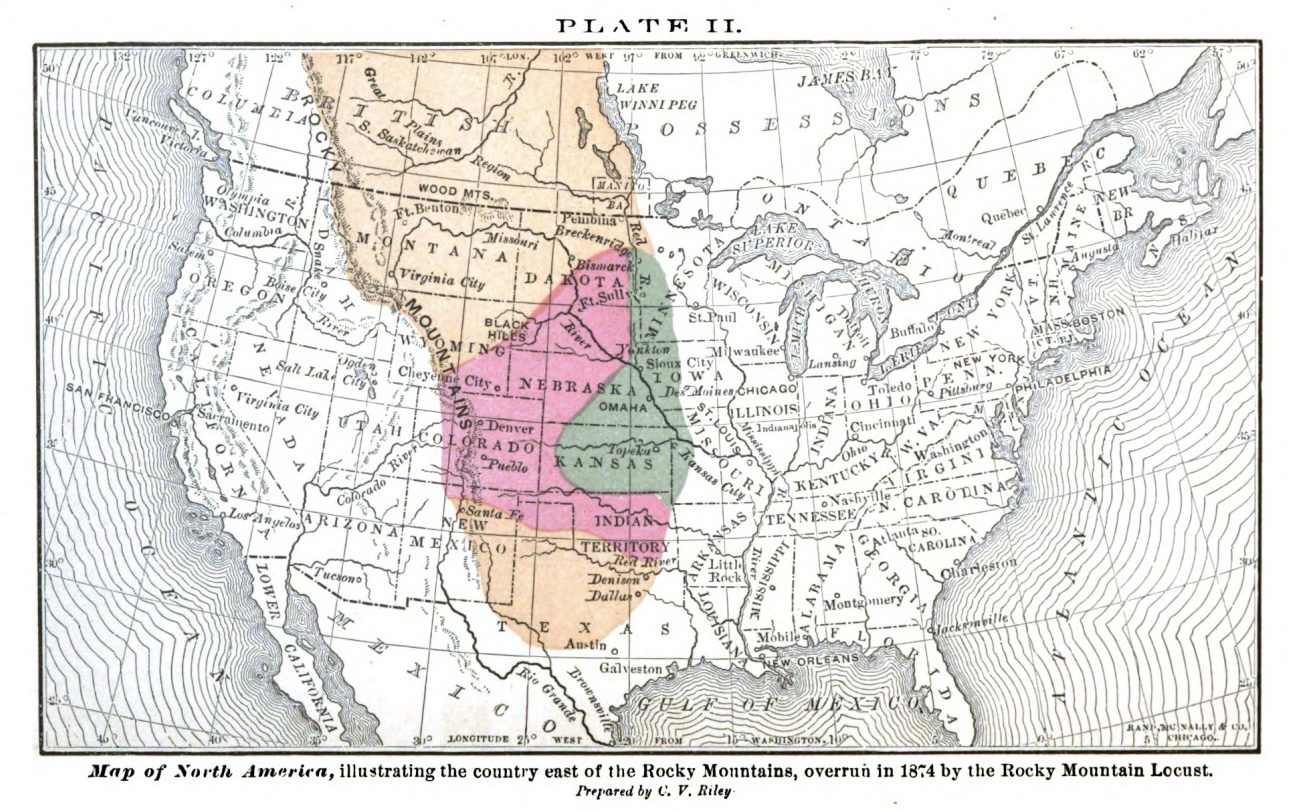
Plate II from Riley’s The locust plague in the United States (1877), showing extent of damage in 1874

The later plague began in the summer of 1873, when similarly migrating Rocky Mountain Locusts laid claim to a territory spreading from southern Wyoming over Nebraska and the Dakotas all the way to Iowa and Minnesota.

The first year the grasshoppers came looking for food and found it in the plentiful wheat fields, where they laid eggs. The newly hatched grasshoppers were wingless for the first six to eight weeks of life, but their work was no less devastating. Until they could fly, they crawled along and feasted on the tender new growth of crops. When their wings grew strong enough, they flew off for another field. This cycle would continue from 1873 to 1877, bringing widespread destruction to a part of the country primarily dependent on an agricultural economy.

Large black clouds made up of thousands of grasshoppers moved from field to field, from county to county. One historian reported that "grasshoppers, sixty to eighty per square yard, could devour one ton of hay per day each forty acres they covered." The grasshoppers ate everything and anything: crops, fruit trees, wooden fork handles, even clothing. In her book On the Banks of Plum Creek, Laura Ingalls Wilder records her eyewitness accounts of the plight of these plagues. She relates how they could not even keep grasshoppers out of the milk pail while milking. She tells how some men headed to the eastern side of the state to find work on unaffected farms.

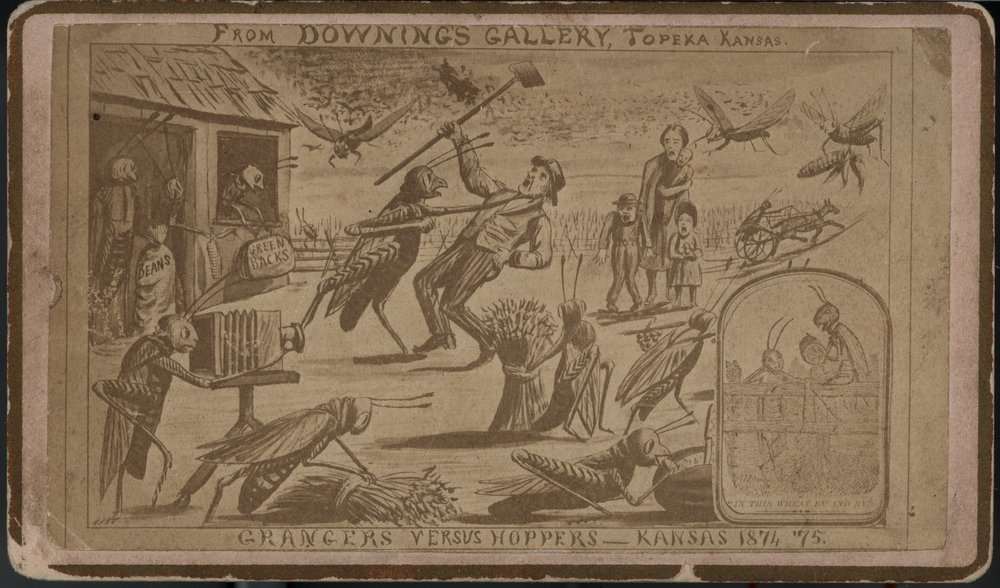
1875 cartoon by Henry Worrall depicting Kansas farmers battling giant grasshoppers.

The farmers who stayed to fight the plague resorted to desperate measures. Some used smudge pots to keep the grasshoppers in flight. Others set their doomed crops on fire in order to kill the fledgling grasshoppers. Many farmers resorted to catching them by hand or in buckets. People started building makeshift "hopper dozers". These machines consisted of pieces of sheet metal smeared with tar, which would be dragged over infested fields. The grasshoppers would get stuck in the tar and be wiped off and burned at each end of the field. However, the grasshoppers devastated crops at a speed that no human invention could compete with.

The number of grasshoppers and the destruction they brought with them grew each year. By the spring of 1877, grasshopper eggs covered approximately two thirds of Minnesota. Each year, the Minnesota State Legislature appropriated more and more funds to assist its distressed citizens with the purchase of seed and even the necessities of food and clothing. People began to lose their faith in man-made interventions. They turned to spiritual means to relieve the devastation caused by the plague. Minnesota governor John S. Pillsbury declared April 26, 1877, a statewide day of prayer. That night and the following day the weather shifted and the rain which fell soon turned to snow. The people thought this could be the event to impede the grasshoppers' destructive advances, but when the storm passed they were as plentiful as ever.

== The first chapel ==
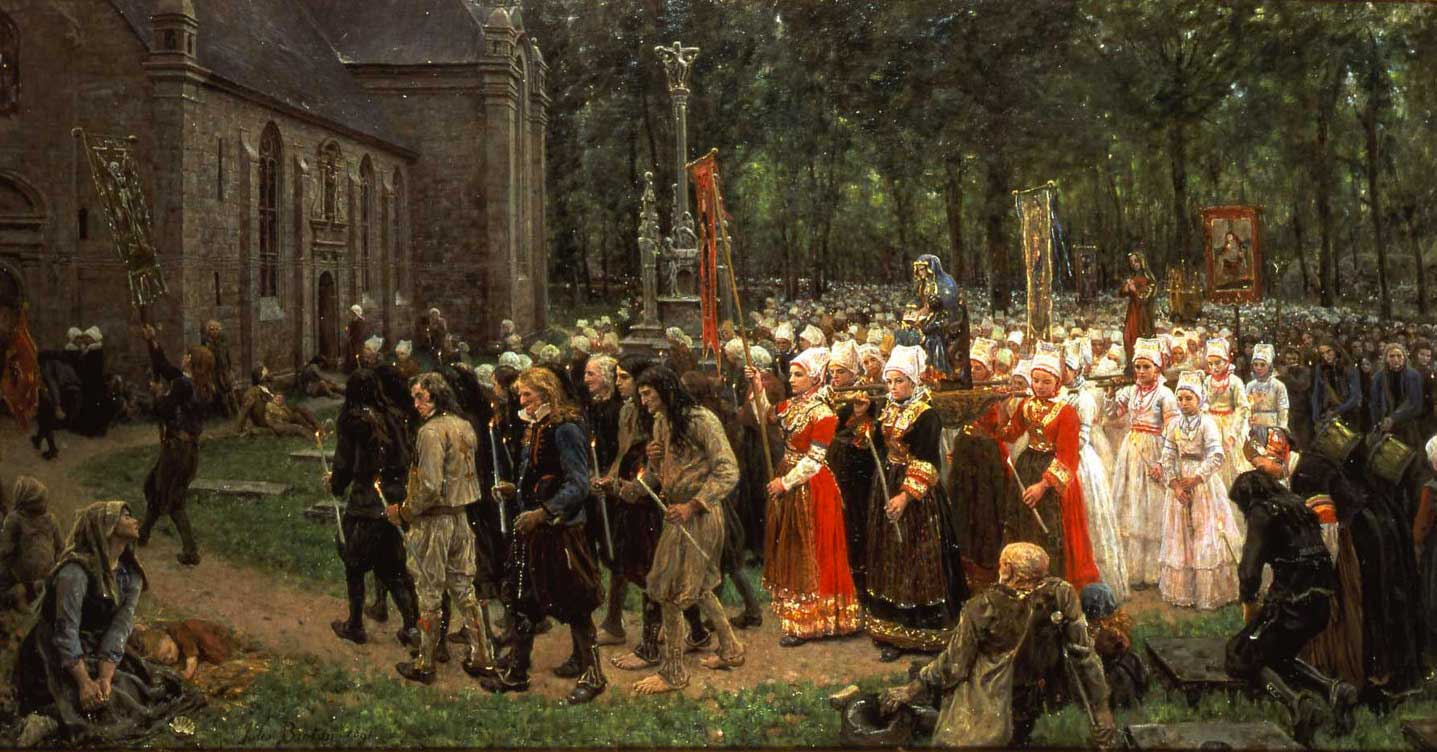
The Pardon at Kergoat (1891) by Jules Breton.

In Stearns County, about a month after the Statewide day of Prayer, newly ordained Father Leo Winter, OSB, was assigned to the Parish of St. James in Jacobs Prairie, with further responsibility for the mission of St. Nicholas eight miles away. In the midst of the plague, Father Winter encouraged the people to continue their prayers of supplication.

According to Fr. Robert J. Voigt, Father Winter, "felt the plague was a punishment sent by God because the people had become too self-sufficient. They had their plots of land by now and some income, so they started to forget about God. Father Leo felt it was time for the people to repent of their waywardness and plead with God to remove the plague. So he urged the people to continue that Day of Prayer in their homes and he did so himself in their churches."

One Sunday, while Father Winter was saying the Offertory of the Tridentine Mass, the thought came to him of urging his parishioners to promise to build a chapel in honor of Mary, Help of Christians, so that She would intercede with Her Son for relief from the grasshopper plague. Father Winter talked over the idea with fellow parishioners. They decided to build a chapel upon Marienberg in the Blessed Virgin’s honor and to offer Masses of Thanksgiving on every Saturday.

The parishioners of the two parishes agreed. They vowed to build a chapel "to honor the mother of God, to take refuge in her as their intercessor and be freed from the ravages of the grasshopper plague." Two farmers donated seven acres halfway between the two parishes of St. James and St. Nicholas. Construction on the Chapel began July 16, 1877. Laura Ingalls Wilder alleges that the grasshoppers left suddenly that month.

All told, the chapel cost a total of $865 and was completed in less than a month. A pilgrimage statue of the Blessed Virgin holding the Christ Child was carved by Slovenian-immigrant Joseph Ambroziz, an 80-year old farmer and folk artist from St. Joseph, Minnesota.

Surviving descriptions of the day of the chapel's completion and dedication, August 15, 1877, bear close similarities to a traditional Breton pardon or to the pattern days of Gaelic Ireland. All houses in the nearby villages were decorated in advance with flags and with garlands of oak and evergreen branches. Triumphal arches (German: Triumphbogen), which were also made of oak and evergreen branches and festooned with legends in both Ecclesiastical Latin, Standard German, and the local dialect known as "Stearns County German", were constructed in advance and lined the whole planned pilgrimage route.

As described by a local reporter for Der Nordstern, cannons were fired off at 5:00 am to announce the beginning of a religious procession (German: Bittgang) in the nearby villages of Cold Spring, Jacobs Prairie, St. Nicholas, and other communities. The pilgrims from Jacobs Prairie, who, like all other groups of pilgrims, were singing German hymns (German: Kirchenlieder) and praying the rosary. According to Fr. Robert J. Voigt, while praying the rosary, it is traditional in Stearns County German culture to mention which of the Mysteries of the Rosary is being focussed upon right after the Name of Jesus during each Hail Mary.

The pilgrims from Jacobs Prairie walked behind a wagon upon which carried a wooden statue of the Blessed Virgin and the Christ Child, Who were surrounded by twelve girls dressed in white and bearing white flags. They were followed by four priests, several altar boys swinging censers, twenty six men on horseback, and many other pilgrims. As the pilgrims passed through Cold Spring, a reporter later commented that the houses were decorated with flags, and oak and evergreen garlands as though the Blessed Virgin herself, or some earthly monarch, were visiting the community.

Upon the arrival of all the pilgrims at the chapel, Father Winter and the other priest cooperated in consecrating the altar and offered a Tridentine Missa Solemnis.

On August 23, 1877, Der Nordstern reported about the chapel, "the place, which a month ago was a wilderness, and overgrown with wild brush, can today be called a paradise, a place of refuge for pilgrims."

According to a document signed and notarized with six witnesses, by the time the second Mass was offered in the Chapel on September 8, 1877, no grasshoppers remained.

There has not been a grasshopper plague in Minnesota or the Midwest at large since 1877. The Masses in Maria Hilf continued as promised, and the farmers began to harvest successful crops the next year.

Furthermore, the last documented sighting of live Rocky Mountain locusts took place in southern Canada in 1902. In 2014, the species of insect which was once numerous enough to block out the sun and reduce farm families throughout North America to the brink of starvation was formally declared extinct by the International Union for Conservation of Nature.

According to the official history of St. Boniface Roman Catholic Church in Cold Spring, "To what soon became known as Marienberg, or 'Mary Hill', regular pilgrimages were regularly made. In many instances, these were made penitentiary on foot, or even barefooted. Up the face of the steep slope, earthen steps were cut, on which the devout would kneel step by step with praying a Hail Mary at each. Tales were told of miracles wrought by these prayers -- especially in the case of a sickly boy of the pioneer Nicholas Hansen family. Restored to health, he went on in adulthood to be a first missionary to the Bahamas, Bonaventure Hansen, O.S.B."

According to Stephen Gross, the future Bahamian missionary was stricken with Sydenham's chorea when only 12-years of age, only to be completely cured as his parents made a twelve mile Bittgang, or pilgrimage on foot, to the Blessed Virgin's shrine upon Marienberg.

== 1894 tornado ==
The original wooden chapel was hit on June 28, 1894, by a tornado travelling from the southeast, and was picked up and smashed into a nearby grove of trees. The destruction of the chapel was complete--except for the wooden statue of the Virgin Mary and the Christ Child which had been carved by Joseph Ambroziz and carried in the wagon from Jacobs Prairie in 1877. After the 1894 tornado, the statue still stood unharmed in the ruins of the chapel.

Meanwhile, Anton Bold, one of the two donors for the land on which the chapel sits, saved his life by clinging to a stump. He later recalled, (German: "Der hat oben und unten gerüpft, aber ich hab' fest gehalten!") ("It plucked at me above and below, but I held on tight!")

According to Fr. Robert J. Voigt, "The cyclone did not stop at the chapel. It destroyed other farm homes, barns, and granaries. It killed and injured cattle and horses, but missed the people, for they hid in their cellars. The tornado headed north. It gobbled up the church at Jacobs Prairie for dessert, and after travelling twenty miles, it did $60,000 worth of damage at St. John's Abbey. The storm even brought St. John's a present, some feed stacks from Cold Spring, identified by the farmers' names. In the winter, the farmers talked about rebuilding their chapel, but in summer with the pressure of farm work, they forgot about it..."

Marienberg would accordingly stand vacant for the next fifty-eight years.

== Second chapel ==
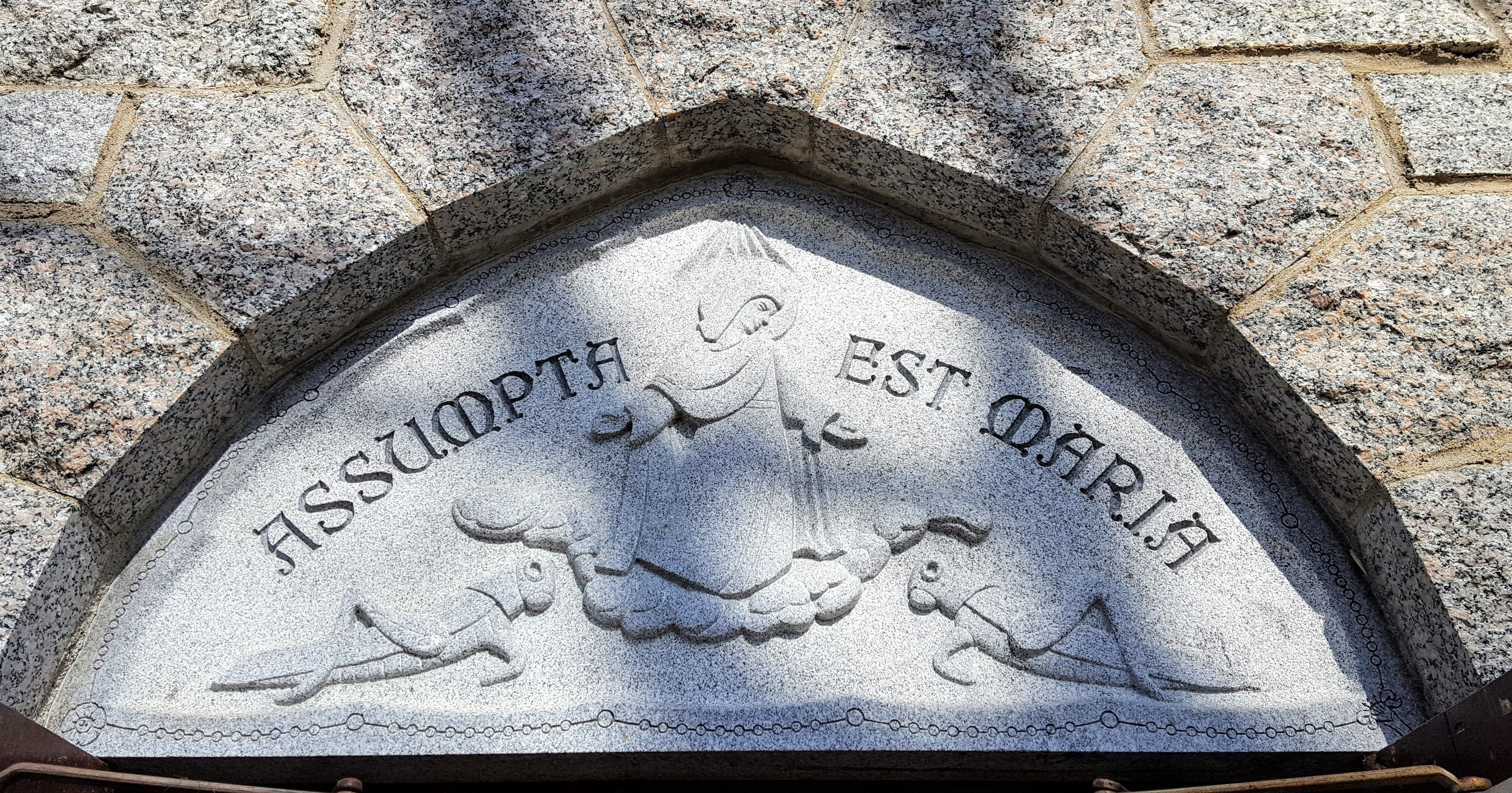
Stone inscription above chapel door, reading "Assumpta est Maria"

In 1952, in honor of the centennial of the diocese of Saint Cloud, the Chapel was rebuilt. The current chapel stands sixteen by twenty-six feet, the approximate size of the original building. It was constructed of rough granite, much of which was donated by the Cold Spring Granite Company. The inside of the Chapel is simple and has no pews, only an altar. The chapel's inside walls are carved from polished agate and carnelian granite. The Chapel also features four stained-glass windows. Above the altar stands the very same wooden statue of the Blessed Virgin and the Christ Child that was carved by Joseph Ambroziz, carried in the wagon from Jacobs Prairie in 1877, and which survived the destruction of the original chapel by the tornado in 1894.

As the doctrine of the Assumption of Mary had only just been formally defined in 1950, the dedication of the chapel was changed accordingly. For this reason, as well, a stone carving above the door is inscribed in Ecclesiastical Latin, "Assumpta est Maria" ("Mary has been taken up"). Our Lady is pictured, and at her feet, bowing in submission, are two grasshoppers.

This new chapel was dedicated on October 7, 1952. Today, in continuation of the Chapel's tradition, there is an annual August 15 Mass celebrated inside the Assumption Chapel upon Marienberg.

Since 1962, an outdoor shrine to St. Joseph has also been located nearby. A large outdoor crucifixion shrine and Stations of the Cross were added more recently.

The centennial of the chapel on August 15, 1977, was commemorated by the Roman Catholic Diocese of Saint Cloud with a religious procession from the (since demolished) Gothic Revival St. Boniface Roman Catholic Church in downtown Cold Spring to the chapel, where Mass was offered by Bishop George Speltz. A formal proclamation was also issued for the anniversary, by which Governor of Minnesota Rudy Perpich, "do hereby join with you in a reaffirmation of faith and thanksgiving" for, "the 'miracle' that took place one hundred years ago.'"

Since 1990, for nine consecutive weeks in May and June, Mass is celebrated on Thursday evenings; a novena for the intention of a safe planting season and a good harvest. The surrounding parishes take turns offering the Mass.

A 23-mile bicycle pilgrimage to and from the chapel on the Feast of the Assumption has been taking place locally for at least 25-years. Similarly to the revival of the Medieval Pilgrimage to Chartres following the Second Vatican Council in France, local Traditional Catholics have revived annual pilgrimages on foot to the Assumption Chapel upon Marienberg and many once forgotten traditions attached to them.

== Other local pilgrimage chapels ==
=== St. Augusta ===
The St. Boniface Chapel was built in obedience to a similar vow by the parishioners of St. Wendelin's Church in Luxemburg and St. Mary, Help of Christians Church, both of which now lie within the city limits of St. Augusta, "half-way between their parish churches - on a small tree-crowned hill on the Henry Kaeter farm". Annual pilgrimages from both parishes to the chapel continued for many years afterwards on June 5, the Feast Day of St. Boniface, an Anglo-Saxon missionary and Benedictine martyr for the Christianisation of the Germanic peoples, who is revered as the "Apostle to the Germans". The rosary would be prayed during the route, followed by a Solemn High Mass with both parish choirs taking turns. In keeping with the Stearns County German proverb, (German: "Sogar beim Begräbnis müß man Spaß haben, sonst geht niemand mit") ("If there were never any fun at funerals, nobody would ever go"), the Mass was always followed by an open air dinner reception accompanied by singing, dancing, and the playing of German folk music, which bore strong parallels with both a traditional Sängerfest and a Pennsylvania Dutch Fersommling. Sometimes, similarly to traditional Irish Pattern Days, rivalry between the two parishes would result in fist fights during the dinner, particularly when alcohol became involved. The St. Boniface Chapel pilgrimage and its associated customs were only gradually abandoned in the late 1880s.

After taking the helm of St. Mary Help of Christians Church in 1958, Fr. Severin Schwieters convinced his parishioners that the chapel was a highly important local heritage monument which deserved to be restored. At his urging, the parishioners moved the ruins to a wooded hill near the original site and reconstructed, as much as possible, using the original wood and other materials. St. Augustine's Church in east St. Cloud donated a new altar and all other items necessary for saying the Tridentine Mass. By St. Boniface's Day 1961, the chapel was ready for the pilgrimage to be restored which sometimes still continues.

=== St. Cloud ===
A similar Roman Catholic pilgrimage chapel and large outdoor crucifixion shrine formerly stood atop what still called "Calvary Hill" (German: Kalvarienberg) and along what is now Cooper Avenue in the South Side of St. Cloud, Minnesota. Although the chapel was the first building destroyed by the 14 April 1886 tornado and the outdoor crucifix was severely damaged, the chapel was rebuilt and remained a site of pilgrimage on St. Mark's Day and St. Boniface Day until well into the 1890s. When the pilgrims arrived there on St. Boniface Day 1893, they found that the chapel had been the victim of church arson. Whether it was again rebuilt remains unknown.

== Catholic hymns traditionally sung in the Germanosphere during Marian pilgrimages ==
=== Background ===
According to Fr. Coleman J. Barry, there is traditionally a very intensive rivalry between parish choirs in Stearns County German culture. From the time of early settlement, every local parish choir used B.H.F. Hellebusch's Katholisches Gesang und Gebet Buch and the six Sing Messen found therein until the Regensburg-style of Gregorian Chant was introduced beginning in the 1880s. Parish choir-directors often doubled as local school-masters and were traditionally referred to as, (German: die Kirchen Väter), or "The Church Fathers". Catholic hymns in the German language (German: Kirchenlieder), which were always carefully chosen to fit the occasion, were also traditionally sung during pilgrimages and at Low Mass.

=== As appearing in the Cantate! hymnal of the period ===
- Ein Haus voll Glorie schauet composed by Fr. Joseph Hermann Mohr (1834–1892), in a deliberately similar tempo to the Prussian Army military marches that were widely popular during the German Empire, as an anthem of nonviolent resistance to the anti-Catholicism of Otto von Bismarck's Kulturkampf. At the time of its composition, Fr. Mohr, a Jesuit priest, was living in the Third French Republic as a refugee from the Iron Chancellor's Jesuit Law of 1872.
- Freu dich, du Himmelskönigin (author unknown; a verse paraphrase of the Regina caeli dating from c. 1600)
- Gegrüßet seist du, Königin, a verse paraphrase of the Salve Regina by Johann Georg Seidenbusch (1641–1729) of the Aufhausen Priory, near Regensburg, Kingdom of Bavaria. Known throughout the Anglosphere under the translated lyrics titled "Hail Holy Queen Enthroned Above", which first appeared in 1884.
- Lasst uns erfreuen, a Marian Easter hymn composed during the Counter-Reformation and the Thirty Years' War, by Fr. Friedrich Spee (1591–1635), a Jesuit missionary priest in Westphalia, religious poet, and early polemicist against witch-hunts
- Maria, breit den Mantel aus, (author unknown; but first published at Innsbrück in 1641 and later updated into Standard German by Fr. Joseph Hermann Mohr. A hymn to the Virgin of Mercy, a Marian devotion which is highly similar to the Byzantine Catholic Protecting Veil of the Mother of God. Also widely used as an anthem of nonviolent resistance to the Kulturkampf)
- Segne du, Maria, composed in 1870 by poet Cordula Wöhler (1845–1916) after her father, a Lutheran pastor at Lichtenhagen, Mecklenburg, threw her out of the house and disowned her for converting to Catholicism.

== Folklore ==
According to Fr. Robert J. Voigt, "At night this chapel is illuminated with spotlights, strategically placed. They have their effect. The story is told of a man who left a Cold Spring tavern and was driving along Highway 23 towards St. Cloud. On the outskirts, he looked up and saw that lighted chapel. Returning to the tavern, he dropped his pint of whiskey on the counter and said, 'Anytime you see a church flying through the air, it's time to quit drinkin'.'"

== See also ==
- German American Demographics
- German language in the United States
- Pilgrimage to Chartres
- Roman Catholic Marian Churches
