= Constitution of Nebraska =

American state constitution

Nebraska Constitution

Overview
- Jurisdiction: Nebraska, United States
- Created: June 12, 1875
- Ratified: October 12, 1875
- Date effective: November 1, 1875; 150 years ago

History
- Amendments: 228

Full text
- Nebraska Constitution at Wikisource

The Nebraska Constitution is the basic governing document of the U.S. state of Nebraska. All acts of the Nebraska Legislature, the governor, and each governmental agency are subordinate to it. The constitution has been amended 228 times since it was first adopted in 1875, most notably to include the creation of a unicameral legislature.

It is nicknamed the Grasshopper Constitution due to the occurrence of Albert's swarm, an immense concentration of grasshoppers that scourged the Western United States in 1875, during the constitutional convention that drafted the constitution.

== History ==
On February 8, 1867, the United States Congress voted to admit Nebraska as a state, provided that suffrage was not denied to non-white voters. The bill admitting Nebraska as a state was vetoed by President Andrew Johnson, but the veto was overridden by a supermajority in both Houses of Congress, and Nebraska was admitted to the Union.

After a failed attempt to ratify a constitution in 1870, in 1874, the Nebraska Legislature proposed a constitutional convention to meet to draft a new constitution. This proposal was overwhelmingly approved by a popular vote of 18,067 to 3,880, and the convention, consisting of sixty-nine members, began meeting May 11, 1875.

The Nebraska Constitution, based partly upon the 1870 Constitution of Illinois, was adopted by the constitutional convention on June 12, 1875. This constitution became known as the Grasshopper Constitution, as it coincided with Albert's swarm, an immense concentration of grasshoppers that invaded the Western United States. The constitution was ratified on October 12, 1875 after it was approved by a popular vote of 30,322 to 5,474, and came into force on November 1, 1875.

With the addition of 228 amendments since its adoption, including the creation of a unicameral legislature, the 1875 Nebraska Constitution remains the basic law of the state to this day.

Nebraska held a constitutional convention in 1919–20 with 41 amendments adopted.

== Preamble ==
The Nebraska Constitution Preamble reads:

We, the people, grateful to Almighty God for our freedom, do ordain and establish the following declaration of rights and frame of government, as the Constitution of the State of Nebraska.

== Articles ==
The constitution consists of eighteen articles, excluding the Preamble.

- Article I – Bill of Rights
- Article II – Distribution of Powers
- Article III – Legislative
- Article IV – Executive
- Article V – Judicial
- Article VI – Suffrage
- Article VII – Education
- Article VIII – Revenue
- Article IX – Counties
- Article X – Public Service Corporations
- Article XI – Municipal Corporations
- Article XII – Miscellaneous Corporations
- Article XIII – State, County, and Municipal Indebtedness
- Article XIV – Militia
- Article XV – Miscellaneous Provisions
- Article XVI – Amendments
- Article XVII – Schedule
- Article XVIII – Term Limits on Congress

== See also ==
- Nebraska Legislature
