= Ebacher (surname) =

Ebacher is a surname. Notable people with the surname include:

- Joseph P. Ebacher (1921–1974), American educator and founder of the Ebacher Method of foreign language learning
- Roger Ébacher, current archbishop of the Roman Catholic Archdiocese of Gatineau
