= Grasshopper Glacier =

Grasshopper Glacier may refer to:

- Grasshopper Glacier (Montana), in the Beartooth Range
- Grasshopper Glacier (Wyoming), in the Wind River Range
