= Magnus of Füssen =

Missionary saint in southern Germany

Saint Magnus of Füssen
- Statue of St Mang of Füssen outside the Basilica of St Mang in Füssen, Bavaria.
- Died: 7th or 8th century
- Feast: 6 September

Magnus of Füssen, otherwise Magnoald or Mang, was a missionary saint in southern Germany, also known as the Apostle of the Allgäu. He is believed to have been a contemporary either of Gall (died 627) or of Boniface (died 754) and is venerated as the founder of St. Mang's Abbey, Füssen.

== Legend ==
There is almost no reliable information about him. The only source is an old "Vita S. Magni", which however contains so many obvious anachronisms that little reliance can be placed on it. It relates that the two Irish missionaries Columbanus and Gallus, spent some time with Willimar, a priest at Arbon. Here Gallus fell sick and was put in charge of Magnus and Theodore (Magnoald and Theodo), two clerics living with Willimar, while Columbanus proceeded to Italy and founded Bobbio Abbey. When Gallus had been miraculously informed of the death of Columbanus he sent Magnus to pray at his grave in Bobbio. Magnus returned with the staff of Columbanus and thereafter they followed his rule. After the death of Gallus, Magnus succeeded him as superior of the cell.

About this time a priest of the Diocese of Augsburg, named Tozzo or Toto, came as a pilgrim to the grave of Gall and invited Magnus to accompany him to the eastern part of the Allgäu. Magnus proceeded to Eptaticus (Epfach), where Wikterp, Bishop of Augsburg received him and entrusted him with the Christianization of the eastern Allgäu. He penetrated into the wilderness, then crossed the river Lech at a place still known as St. Mangstritt ("footstep of Saint Magnus") and built a cell, where afterwards the monastery of Füssen was erected, and where he died.

He was buried in the church he had constructed. In 851 he was reburied in the newly erected church. One of his bones was sent to St Gallen in Switzerland. Around the year 1100 all his bones were found to be missing. The burial place can be seen in the crypt of St Mang Basilica, Füssen. A tiny splinter of the breast bone was sent from St Gallen to Füssen and this is now located in a large glass cross hanging above the main altar. It also contains the staff, cross and chalice of the saint.

== Vita ==
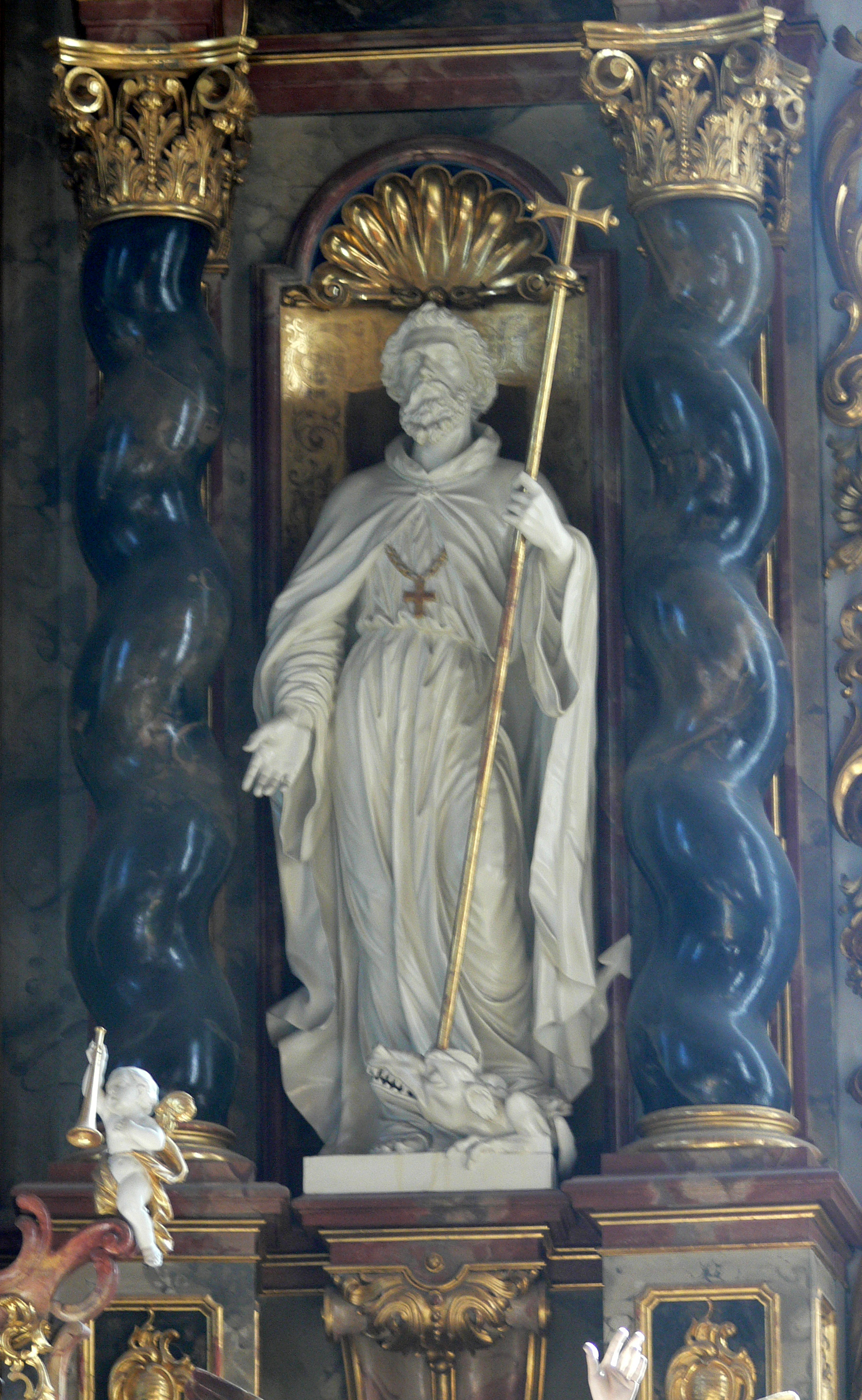
Statue of Saint Magnus

The "Life" was said to have been written by Theodore, the companion of Magnus, under whose head it was placed in the grave. When in 851 Bishop Lanto transferred the relics to the newly erected church of Füssen, this "Life" is said to have been found in a scarcely legible condition, and to have been emended and re-written by Ermenrich, a monk of Ellwangen. It was re-edited with worthless additions in 1070 by Otloh of St. Emmeram. A manuscript is preserved at the Abbey of St. Gall (Codex 565).

The chief inconsistencies in the "Life" are the following: Magnus is made a disciple of Gall (died 627) and at the same time he is treated as a contemporary of Wichbert, the first historically established bishop of Augsburg (died about 749). Other manifest impossibilities have induced Mabillon and other authorities to reject the whole "Life" as a forgery of a much later date. Another school of thought however is that the second part of the "Life" was written in 851 in Ellwangen (although probably not by Ermenrich) when the relics of the saint were transferred there, while the first part, where Magnus is made a companion of Gall, is a later addition, which may incorporate the remains of the story of an earlier saint also called Magnus. This second view seems to have attracted greater support.

== Life ==
In reality, Magnus was probably working on behalf of Bishop Wikterp together with Tozzo and Theodor from about 746 in Ostallgäu. He first worked with Theodor, and together they established an abbey dedicated to the Virgin Mary and Gordianus and Epimachus at Kempten, the first in the Allgäu region. While Theodor remained in Kempten, Magnus worked on the upper Lech and in 746 built a prayer house in Waltenhofen near Schwangau. He then founded a cell and oratory at Füssen from which a monastic community grew. Its location on the old Via Claudia Augusta from Augsburg to northern Italy gave it strategic importance, and the Abbey received support from Pepin the Short.

Magnus is the patron saint of the Allgäu, von Füssen, and Kempten; and is invoked for the protection of cattle; and against eye diseases, snakebite, worms, rats, mice and field insects. His feast is celebrated on 6 September.

The veneration of Saint Magnus was carried to the New World by the German Catholic peasant pioneers whom Francis Xavier Pierz had persuaded to settle in Central Minnesota following the Treaty of Traverse des Sioux in 1851. Magnus, whose intercession was credited with the defeat of the 1856-1857 Rocky Mountain locust plague, continued to be widely venerated in and around Stearns County, Minnesota, as a patron of good harvests and as the protector against lightning, hail, and plagues of vermin. Furthermore, his Feast Day on September 6 continued to be celebrated until well into the 1870s, both in and around Jacobs Prairie, Minnesota, as, "Grasshopper Day." (See also Assumption Chapel)

The cult of Saint Magnus of Cuneo may have arisen as a result of the expansion of Magnus of Füssen's cult into Italy, with Magnus of Cuneo mistakenly being considered a separate saint.
