= Joseph P. Ebacher =

American educator (1921–1974)

- Born: June 12, 1921; Acushnet, Massachusetts, U.S.
- Died: December 15, 1974 (aged 53); Jacobs Prairie, Minnesota, U.S.
- Education: LaSalette College
- Occupation: Educator
- Spouse: Gloria Monahan
- Children: 9

Joseph P. Ebacher (June 12, 1921—December 15, 1974) was an American educator and founder of the Ebacher Method.

== Biography ==
Ebacher was born June 12, 1921, in Acushnet, Massachusetts, he spent his childhood in Amesbury, Massachusetts. The son of French-Canadian immigrants (Phileas Dominic Ebacher and Rose Alma Pinault), his family included five sisters (Beatrice #1 died as a newborn and Annette died at age 16) and three brothers. His mother died in 1930, when he was 8 years old. His father remarried to Rose Alice Trembley. His three remaining sisters (Beatrice #2, Margaret, and Therese) became religious sisters, joining the order of Sisters of Saint Chretienne. His brother, Roger, became a Trappist Monk, joining the order of Our Lady of Guadelupe Trappist Monastery in Oregon. The other brothers were barbers, Lucien Dominic (Nick) Ebacher lived and worked in Newburyport, Massachusetts, and Raymond lived in various places in the US.

At the age of 12, Joseph attended and graduated from La Salette Seminary in Enfield, New Hampshire, and went on to get his bachelor's degree in French from LaSalette College. Ebacher joined the United States Navy in World War II and was assigned to a Landing Ship, Tank in Hawaii. At the conclusion of World War II, he returned to civilian life and enrolled in Boston College, where he met his future wife, Gloria Monahan. While at Boston College, he was a contemporary with both John F. Kennedy and Robert F. Kennedy. He graduated with a master's degree in Sociology, and went to work teaching French at Newton College of the Sacred Heart in Newton, Massachusetts.

In 1957, he moved his family of six children to Cincinnati, Ohio, accepting a position of Associate Professor of French at Xavier University. While at Xavier, he invented the Ebacher Method, which was published by Prentice-Hall. This method is used to learn a foreign language, based on behavioral principles of B. F. Skinner. "The format consists of a foreign language text, an interlinear vocabulary, and a plastic grid, which is placed over the page to conceal the vocabulary. When the student needs to, he can slide the grid down, note the English equivalent of the work, raise the grid, and continue reading." This method allows the student to quickly get the translation of the word in question, while keeping it within the context of the original sentence and meaning. Vocabulary words are repeated ten times, and then the student is expected to know the word and no further translation is printed. One learns while reading rather than having to interrupt the reading in order to learn the word. While at Xavier University, he was awarded Teacher of the Year in 1967. As a faculty advisory to the performing arts at Xavier University, Ebacher is remembered for defusing a student demonstration that occurred during a visit to campus by Andy Warhol on April 2, 1968.

In 1968, he moved his family, then of nine children, to St. Cloud, Minnesota, where he accepted a faculty position at Saint John's University. In addition to his teaching responsibilities at Saint John's, Ebacher also was the January Term coordinator in 1970, fought for retirement benefits for the lay faculty, participated in a series of campus abortion debates, and hosted the poet John Beecher. At the time of his death, he was planning a foreign study program in Chartres, France; his travel there in 1973 was undoubtedly a high point of his professional life. Ebacher taught until his untimely death on December 15, 1974, at the age of 53, in the unincorporated town of Jacobs Prairie, Minnesota, near Cold Spring.

In 2001, artist Richard Cecil Schletty used the image of Ebacher in a mural project to represent the seven gifts of the Holy Spirit. Ebacher, a lifelong Roman Catholic, represented the gift of Knowledge.

== Edited works ==
Ebacher edited many classic French language texts, many of which have been reprinted or digitally reproduced.

- Prentice-Hall Programmed Reading French Series:

- Chateaubriand, Francois R. (1965). Atala. Englewood Cliffs, N.J.: Prentice-Hall. ASIN B000I4OA0O.
- Mérimée, Prosper (April 27, 2009). Carmen (Digital reproduction). Englewood Cliffs, N.J.: University of Michigan Library. p. 182. ASIN B002MCZ6RQ.
- Dumas, fils, Alexandre (1965). Les idées de Madame Aubray. Englewood Cliffs, N.J.: Prentice-Hall. ASIN B004BX5QPQ.
- Flaubert, Gustave (1965). Trois contes. Englewood Cliffs, N.J.: Prentice-Hall.

- Duhamel, Georges (1967). Journal De Salavin. Englewood Cliffs, N.J.: Prentice-Hall. p. 214. ISBN 978-0-13-511196-3.
- Saint-Exupéry, Antoine de (1966). Courrier Sud. Englewood Cliffs, N.J.: Prentice-Hall.
- Delmain, Gérard (1966). La Réussite. Englewood Cliffs, N.J.: Prentice Hall. ASIN B0013FR392.
- Bazin, René (1961). Les Oberlé. Cambridge: Educators Pub. Service.
- Enault, Louis (1962). Le chien du capitaine. Cambridge: Educators Pub. Service.
- Daudet, Alphonse (1961). La Belle-Nivernaise: Histoire d'un vieux bateau et de son équipage. Cambridge: Educators Pub. Service.
