= Albert's swarm =

1875 infestation of Rocky Mountain locusts

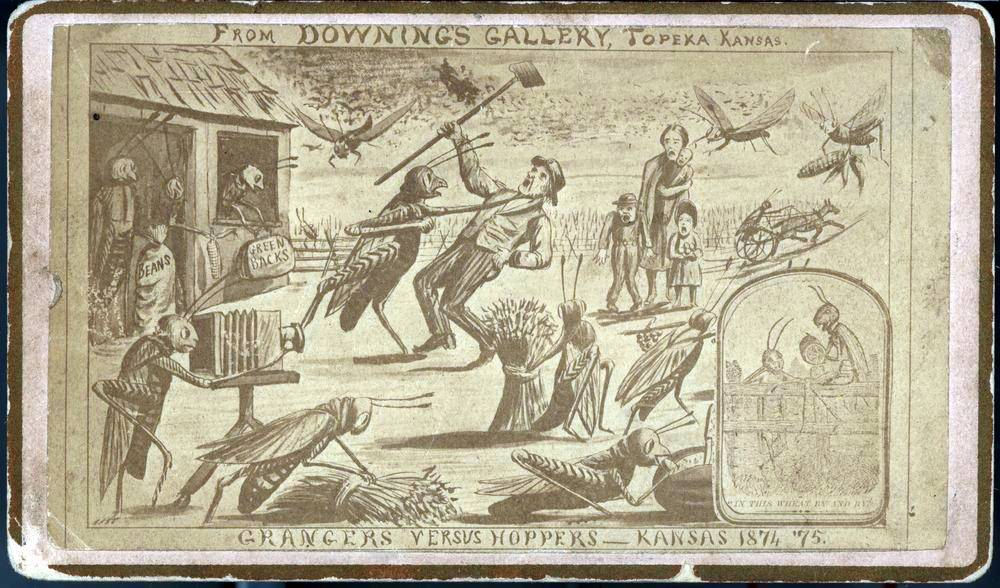
1875 cartoon by Henry Worrall showing Kansas farmers battling giant grasshoppers

Albert's swarm was an immense concentration of the Rocky Mountain locust that swarmed the Western United States in 1875. It was named after Albert Child, a physician interested in meteorology, who calculated the size of the swarm as 198,000 square miles (510,000 km^{2}) by multiplying the swarm's estimated speed with the time it took for it to move through southern Nebraska.

The 1875 swarm is referred to repeatedly in a western Missouri historical record that explains:

It was the year 1875 that will long be remembered by the people of at least four states, as the grasshopper year. The scourge struck Western Missouri April, 1875, and commenced devastating some of the fairest portions of our noble commonwealth. They gave Henry [County] an earnest and overwhelming visitation, and demonstrated with an amazing rapidity that their appetite was voracious, and that everything green belonged to them for their sustenance.

One estimate numbers the locusts in the swarm at 3.5 trillion. Another estimate numbers the swarm at 12.5 trillion, which is the greatest concentration of animals ever speculatively guessed, according to Guinness World Records.

== See also ==
- Locust Plague of 1874
