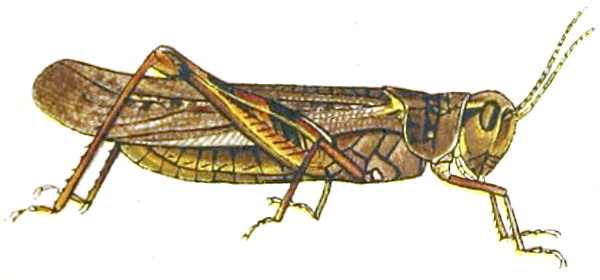
- 1902 illustration

Conservation status
- Extinct (1904) (IUCN 3.1)

- Presumed Extinct (1904) (NatureServe)

Scientific classification
- Kingdom: Animalia
- Phylum: Arthropoda
- Clade: Pancrustacea
- Class: Insecta
- Order: Orthoptera
- Suborder: Caelifera
- Family: Acrididae
- Genus: Melanoplus
- Species: †M. spretus

Binomial name
- †Melanoplus spretus (Walsh, 1866)
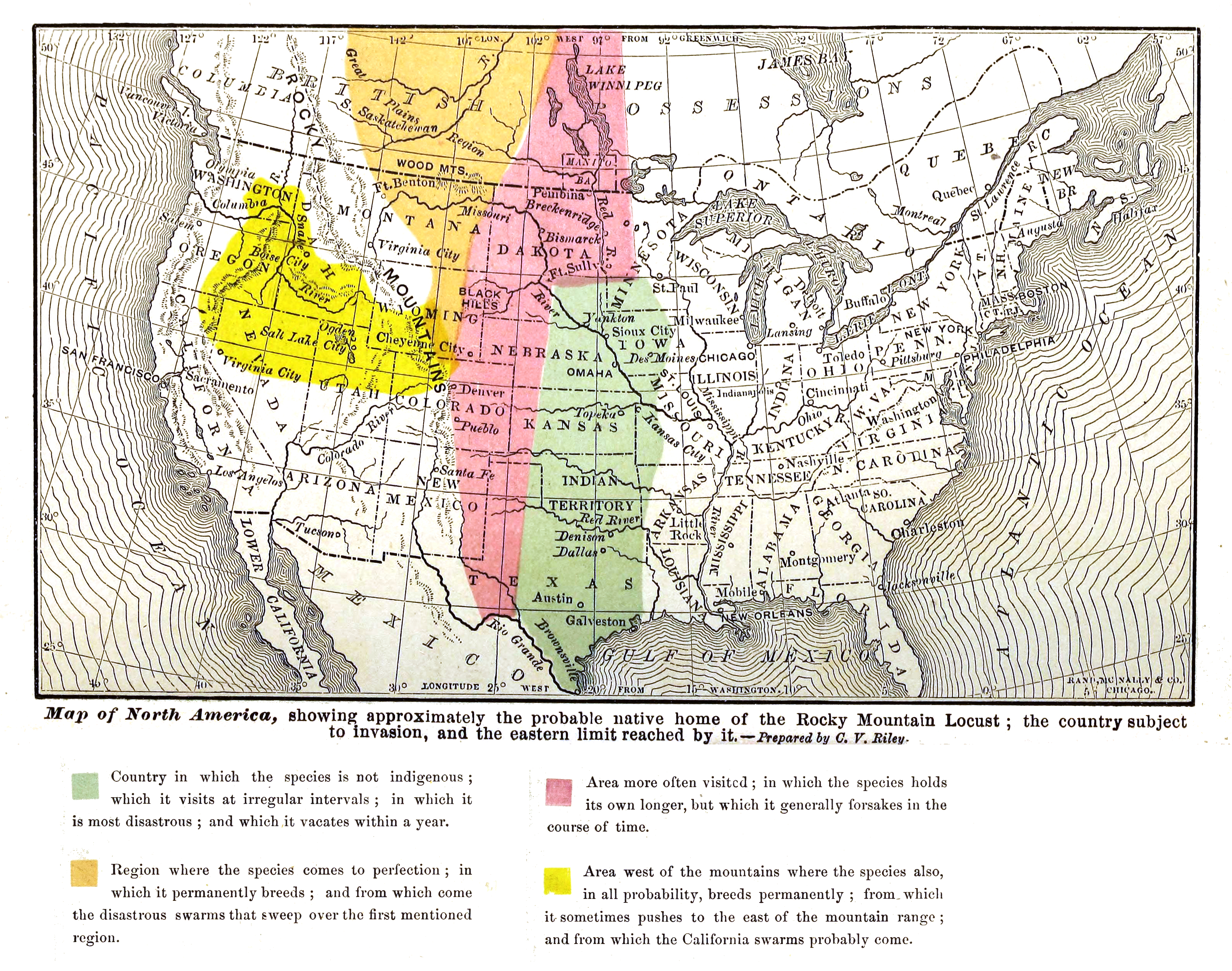

Synonyms
- Caloptenus spretus Walsh, 1866; Acridium spretis Thomas, 1865

= Rocky Mountain locust =

Rocky Mountain locust Temporal range: c.12,100 BC – 1904 AD

Extinct species of grasshopper

The Rocky Mountain locust (Melanoplus spretus) is an extinct species of grasshopper that ranged through the western half of the United States and some western portions of Canada with large numbers seen until the end of the 19th century. Sightings often placed their swarms in numbers far larger than any other locust species, with one famous sighting in 1875 estimated at 198,000 square miles (510,000 km^{2}) in size (greater than the area of California), weighing 27.5 million tons and consisting of some 12.5 trillion insects, the greatest concentration of animals ever recorded, according to Guinness World Records.

Less than 30 years later, the species was apparently extinct. The last recorded collection of a specimen was in 1904 in Colorado. As a creature so ubiquitous was not expected to become extinct, very few specimens were ever collected (though a few preserved remains have been found in Knife Point Glacier, Wyoming, and Grasshopper Glacier, Montana).

Rocky Mountain locusts were a part of the diet of the critically endangered or possibly extinct Eskimo curlew (Numenius borealis) on its spring migration and the extinction of the locust has been speculated as being a factor in the decline of the curlew.

== Taxonomy ==
The species name was formally published with the Latin binomial Caloptenus spretus in 1866 by B.D. Walsh as named by "Mr. Uhler, without describing it," adding that "The name 'spretus' means 'despised', and refers apparently to its having been hitherto despised or overlooked by entomologists". Walsh does not provide a description of the species, except for female wing length, as well as some aspects of biology, ecology, and control. Some entomologists credit the authority for the binomial Caloptenus spretus to C. Thomas, but fails on the Principle of Priority. The treatment under the genus Melanoplus began in 1878 in publications by S. H. Scudder who pointed out the difference between the genus Caloptenus that he noted as being more correctly spelled Calliptenus and Melanoplus.

The species is reported to have descended from the Rocky Mountains to the prairie in large numbers only in certain years, particularly in dry seasons, following westward wind currents. Outbreaks usually lasted two consecutive years. Although a great number of eggs were laid on the prairie during outbreak years, individuals hatched from these eggs usually did not thrive, a condition that has been attributed to the lack of adaptation of this species to prairie habitats.

== Distribution and habitat ==
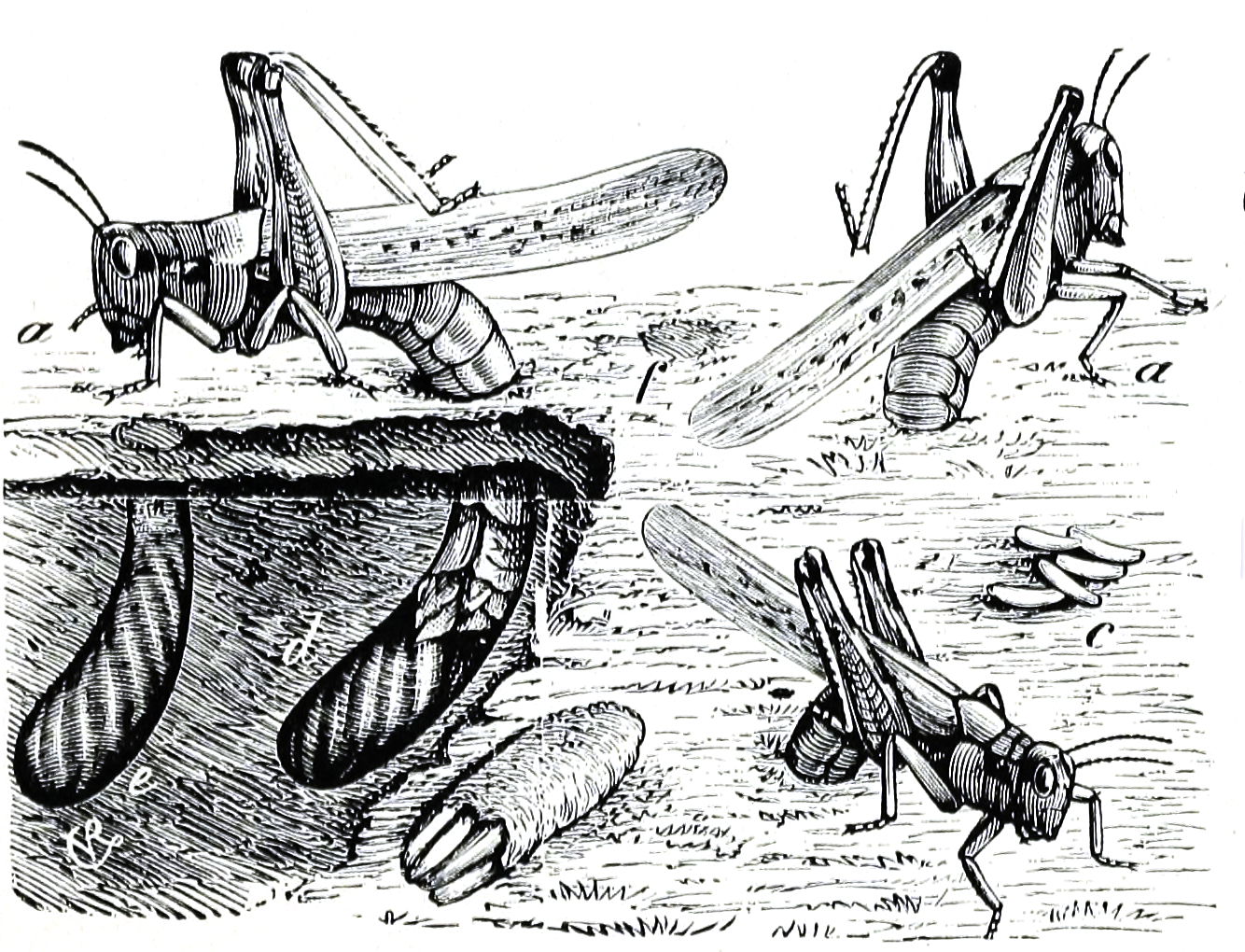
Illustration of egg-laying by females (1877)

The Rocky Mountain locust occurred along both sides of the Rocky Mountains and in most of the prairie areas. Since they bred in sandy areas and thrived in hot and dry conditions, it has been hypothesized that they may have depended on the tall grass prairie plants during drier spells. The destruction of the prairie habitat and the incursion of new flora and fauna along with agricultural practices may have led to the extinction of the species. Large numbers of grasshoppers including a large number of Rocky Mountain locusts entombed in the ice in the Rocky Mountains gave their name to the Grasshopper Glacier. The earliest known fossils indicate that the Rocky Mountain locusts were present in Nevada since the Late Pleistocene, dated to 14,305-14,067 calibrated years Before Present (approximately more than 12,100 years BC).

== History ==
Rocky Mountain locusts became more of a problem in the 19th century, as farming expanded westward into the grasshoppers' favored habitat. Outbreaks of varying severity emerged in 1828, 1838, 1846, and 1855, affecting areas throughout the West. Plagues visited Minnesota in 1856–1857 and again in 1865, and Nebraska suffered repeated infestations between 1856 and 1874.

=== Last major swarm (1873–1877) ===
The last major swarms of Rocky Mountain locust were between 1873 and 1877, when the locust caused $200 million in crop damage in Colorado, Kansas, Minnesota, Missouri, Nebraska and other states. One farmer reported that the locusts seemed "like a great, white glistening cloud, for their wings caught the sunshine on them and made them look like a cloud of white vapor" while another described the experience as "a big snowstorm, where the air was filled with enormous-size flakes." The locusts not only ate the grass and valuable crops, but also leather, wood, sheep's wool, and—in extreme cases—even clothes off peoples' backs. Trains were sometimes brought to a halt after skidding over large numbers of locusts run over on the rails. As the swarms worsened, farmers attempted to control them using gunpowder, fires (sometimes dug in trenches to burn as many of the locusts as possible), smearing them with "hopperdozers", a type of plow device pulled behind horses that had a shield that knocked jumping locusts into a pan of liquid poison or fuel, even sucking them into vacuum cleaner–like contraptions, but all of these were ultimately ineffective in stopping the hordes.

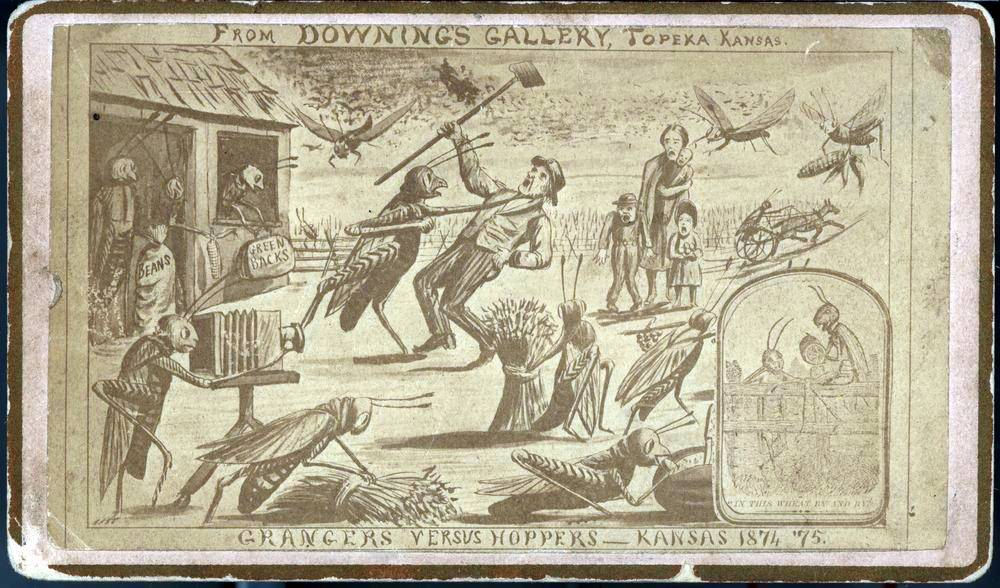
1875 cartoon by Henry Worrall showing Kansas farmers battling giant grasshoppers

Farmers finally responded in force to the swarm's destruction; an 1877 Nebraska law said that anyone between the ages of 16 and 60 had to work at least two days eliminating locusts at hatching time or face a $10 fine. That same year Missouri offered a bounty of $1 a bushel for locusts collected in March, 50 cents a bushel in April, 25 cents in May, and 10 cents in June. Other Great Plains states made similar bounty offers.

Charles Valentine Riley, a Missouri entomologist, came up with a recipe for locusts seasoned with salt and pepper and pan-fried in butter. The recipe sold, but some stated that they "would just as soon starve as eat those horrible creatures."

=== Extinction ===
In the 1880s, farmers had recovered sufficiently from their locust woes to send carloads of corn to flood victims in Ohio. They also switched to such resilient crops as winter wheat, which matured in the early summer, before locusts were able to migrate. Changes in crop choices such as alfalfa have been suggested as a cause. Feeding alfalfa was found to reduce the growth of immature stages of various grasshoppers in studies.

James Fletcher collected a male and female spretus in July 1901 and Norman Criddle did the same in July 1902, both in Manitoba. Morgan Hebard collected three specimens in August 1904, in Colorado, commenting on the difficulty of finding spretus examples in the Rockies.

Melanoplus spretus was formally declared extinct by the IUCN in 2014. The justification did not mention the 2004 DNA investigation. It has been suggested that the now critically endangered Eskimo curlew fed on the locust during its spring migration and that its extinction may have added to the pressures on already declining curlew populations including hunting and the conversion of its grassland habitat to agriculture.

== Theories for extinction ==
It has been hypothesized that the removal of prairie grasses which were maintained by native herbivores such as bison was important for maintaining the main breeding habitat of the locust. The plowing and irrigation by settlers as well as trampling by cattle and other farm animals near streams and rivers in the Rocky Mountains destroyed their eggs in the areas where they permanently lived, which ultimately caused their demise. For example, reports from this era suggest that farmers killed over 150 egg cases per square inch while plowing, harrowing or flooding.

It appeared that this species lived and reproduced in the prairie only temporarily during swarming years, with each generation being smaller than the previous one and swarming ever farther from the Rocky Mountains, while the permanent breeding grounds of this species seemed to be restricted to an area somewhere between 3 and 3,000 square miles (7.8 and 7,770.0 square kilometres) of sandy soils near streams and rivers in the Rockies, which coincided with arable and pastoral lands exploited by settlers.

Theodore D. A. Cockerell wrote in 1927, "the locusts did not permanently establish themselves in the localities they reached, and when the breeding grounds in the Dakotas, etc., were for the most part plowed up and put into cultivation, the swarms became a matter of history. It is safe to say that no invasion of the Rocky Mountain locust will ever occur again..."

== Related species and taxonomic issues ==
One theory proposed was that M. spretus was not a distinct species in the first place and that it might have been a migratory phase, differing slightly in morphology, from a species that may still be extant. M. spretus is similar in appearance based on morphology to a migratory form of M. sanguinipes and the two had been suggested to be sister taxa (closest living relatives). In 2004, four sequences of the mitochondrial DNA were sequenced from M. spretus specimens obtained from eight museum specimens and from fragments preserved in frozen glacial deposits. This study compared it against other North American species of the genus Melanoplus and confirmed its placement in the genus. The sequences from fragments from glaciers matched up with the identified museum specimens. The study was able to find a similarity between M. spretus and M. bruneri suggesting they might be the sister species. All the species in the genus fell within a clade and within them M. spretus, M. sanguinipes, M. mexicanus, M. bruneri, M. femurrubrum, and M. borealis were all found to show inter-relationships without forming perfectly monophyletic species groups. This has been attributed to incomplete lineage sorting of these four regions used and may only be resolved only when more genomic sequences are used in phylogenetic analyses. The same study however found sufficient variability in the sequences to rule out the formation of a genetic bottleneck prior to the extinction.

The 2004 analysis produced the only DNA sequences of the species on GenBank as of 2025.

== In culture ==
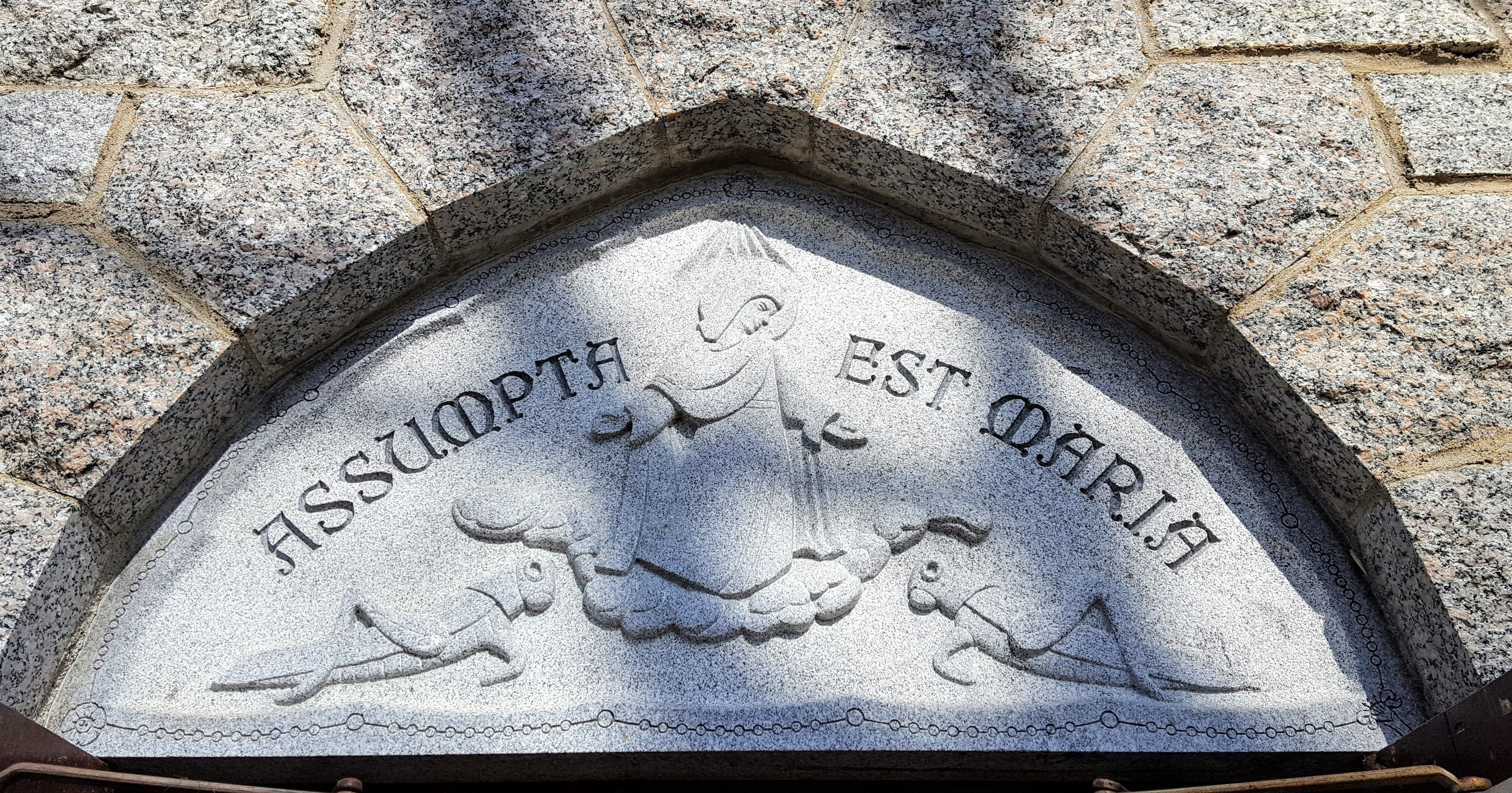
Inscription above the door of the Grasshopper Chapel

Assumption Chapel in Cold Spring, Minnesota, was established as a Christian pilgrimage shrine (German: Wallfahrtsort) (German: Gnadenkapelle) in 1877 by German-American Catholic pioneer farmers, supposedly to keep away future locust plagues similar to those they had faced in both the 1850s and the 1870s. The Feast Day of St. Magnus of Füssen, September 6, was locally celebrated as "Grasshopper Day" because St. Magnus of Füssen is traditionally known in Southern Germany as one of the protectors of farmers from thunderstorms and plagues of vermin.

The 1877 pilgrimage chapel dedicated to St. Boniface in nearby St. Augusta, Minnesota dates from the same era and was built for exactly the same reason. There is a similar local tradition of pilgrimages to the shrine on June 5th, the Feast Day of St. Boniface, an English Benedictine missionary, Bishop, and martyr instrumental to the Christianisation of the Germanic peoples; and who is still revered as the "Apostle to the Germans", Patron Saint of the Germanosphere and the German diaspora.

A semi-fictionalized description of the devastation created by Rocky Mountain locusts in the 1870s can be found in the semi-autobiographical novel On the Banks of Plum Creek by Laura Ingalls Wilder. Her description was based on actual incidents in western Minnesota during the summers of 1874 and 1875 as the locusts destroyed her family's wheat crop.

Another vivid portrayal of the depredations of the locust can be found in Ole Edvart Rølvaag's Giants in the Earth, based in part on his own experiences and those of his wife's family.

In 2018, a chamber opera about the Rocky Mountain locust named Locust: The Opera premiered in Wyoming, USA. The libretto for the opera was written by professor and author Jeffrey Lockwood who adapted it from his book Locust: the Devastating Rise and Mysterious Disappearance of the Insect that Shaped the American Frontier.

== See also ==
- Dissosteira longipennis - a still-extant North American locust species
- Locust Plague of 1874
- List of recently extinct insects
- Mormon cricket – another large, swarming orthopteran native to western North America
- Passenger pigeon – another example of rapid anthropogenic extinction of a North American species
