= Grasshopper Glacier (Montana) =

Glacier in Montana, United States

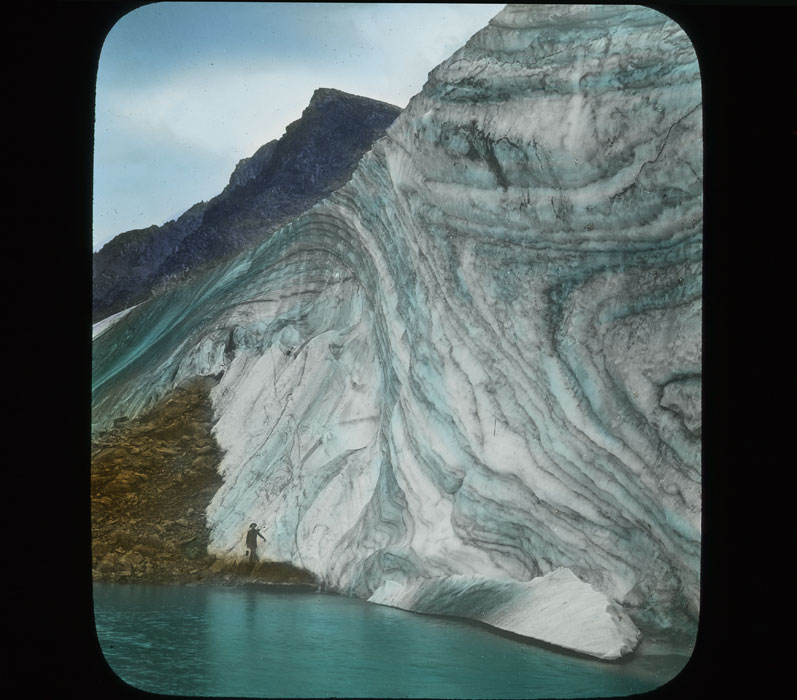
- Glass Slide of Grasshopper Glacier in 1900

- Location within Montana Location within the United States
- Type: Mountain glacier
- Location: Park County, Montana, U.S.
- Coordinates: 45°08′03″N 109°53′02″W
- Area: 320 acres (1.3 km^{2})
- Length: 0.20 miles (0.32 km)
- Terminus: Talus/proglacial lake
- Status: Retreating

Grasshopper Glacier is in the Beartooth Mountains, Custer National Forest, Montana, U.S. The glacier is within the Absaroka-Beartooth Wilderness, a part of the Greater Yellowstone Ecosystem. Grasshopper Glacier is approximately 0.20 miles (0.32 km) long and 0.25 mi (0.40 km) wide. Starting at a point more than 11,300 feet (3,400 m) above sea level, the glacier originally was more than 5 mi (8.0 km) long but has receded significantly since first researched in the early 20th century. As of 2007, the glacier consists of several smaller glaciers, each occupying a different north-facing cirque. Grasshopper Glacier was named for the tens of millions of grasshoppers (locusts) that have been found entombed in the ice, some for hundreds and perhaps thousands of years. Many of the grasshoppers are of species that are now extinct, and their high level of preservation allowed early researchers to send some specimens to entomologists for identification. During this research it was discovered that some of the grasshoppers were of the extinct species Melanoplus spretus (Rocky Mountain locust), known to have existed at least up to the beginning of the 20th century.

Known to travel in swarms numbering in the trillions in some years, it is believed that the grasshoppers found in the glacier may have been caught in severe storms and perished. Until the late 20th century, the grasshopper remains were quite common; however, lower snowfall rates since the late 1980s and higher temperatures have contributed to a higher melting rate of the glacier and many specimens decompose before they can be retrieved.

Access to the glacier is difficult due to poor weather conditions and the requirement to travel via off road vehicle and then hike on foot several miles to the base of the glacier. The road is impassable for up to 10 months of the year. The Beartooth Highway (U.S. 212) is one of the closest access roads. Two smaller glaciers in the immediate region also have the same species of grasshoppers entombed in their ice; one is also named Grasshopper Glacier, the other simply Hopper Glacier. Other glaciers also bear the name for the same reason, including one in the Crazy Mountains north/northwest of the Beartooths, and Grasshopper Glacier in the Shoshone National Forest in Wyoming.

== See also ==
- List of glaciers in the United States
