= St. Mary Help of Christians Church (St. Augusta, Minnesota) =

Historic church in Minnesota, United States

- Church of St. Mary Help of Christians–Catholic
- U.S. National Register of Historic Places
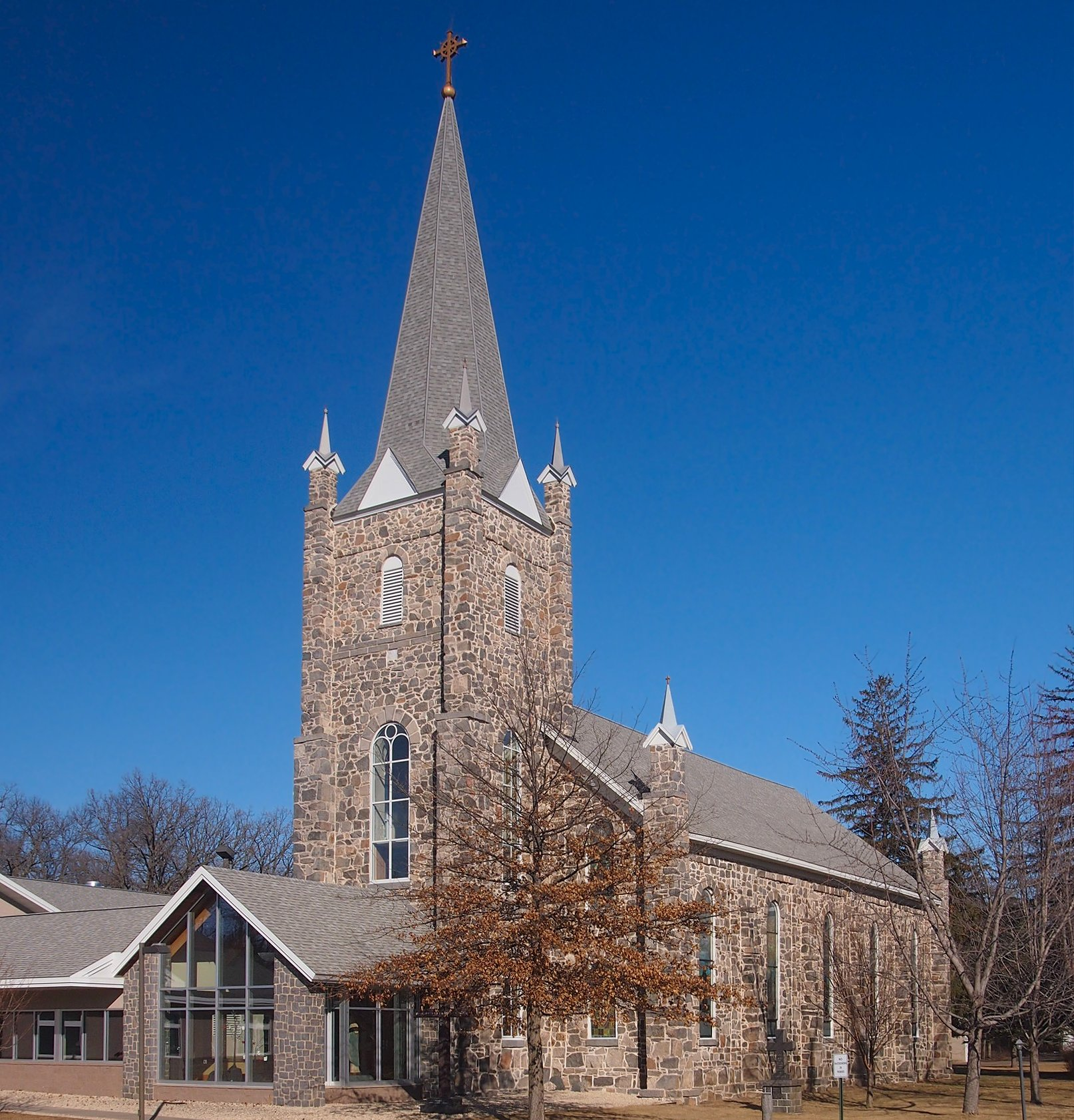
- St. Mary Help of Christians Church viewed from the southwest

- Location within Minnesota Location within the United States
- Location: 24588 County Road 7, St. Augusta, Minnesota
- Coordinates: 45°28′46.8″N 94°9′8″W
- Area: 2.5 acres (1.0 ha)
- Built: 1873 (church), 1890 (rectory)
- Architectural style: Gothic Revival
- MPS: Ethnic Hamlet Churches–Stearns County Catholic Settlement Churches TR
- NRHP reference No.: 82003049
- Added to NRHP: April 15, 1982

St. Mary Help of Christians Church is a historic Roman Catholic church building in St. Augusta, Minnesota, United States. It is part of the Roman Catholic Diocese of Saint Cloud. The church was constructed in 1873 in a rural community settled by German immigrants. An 1890 rectory stands southeast of the church. Both buildings were listed on the National Register of Historic Places in 1982 for their state-level significance in the themes of architecture, exploration/settlement, and religion. The property was nominated for reflecting the settlement of rural Stearns County by Catholic immigrant groups clustered in small, ethnic hamlets dominated by a central church.

== See also ==
- List of Catholic churches in the United States
- National Register of Historic Places listings in Stearns County, Minnesota
