= Francis Xavier Weninger =

Austrian jesuit (1805–1888)

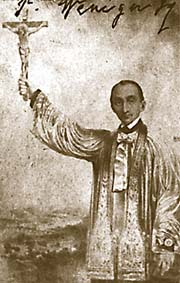
Francis Xavier Weninger

Francis Xavier Weninger (German: Franz Xaver Weninger; 31 October 1805 in Wildhaus (Slovene: Viltuš), Styria, Austria (now Slovenia) – 29 June 1888 in Cincinnati, Ohio) was an Austrian Jesuit missionary and author.

== Life ==
Weninger was born in Marburg an der Drau a province in southern Austria, to a prominent family with connections to the Austrian aristocracy. He spent much of his youth in Vienna. He attended the gymnasium in Marburg, but having expressed an interest in a military career, his father sent him to Laybach to learn to be a pharmacist.

With the consent of the druggist training him, Weninger continued his studies. His progress was brought to the attention of Empress Caroline Augusta of Bavaria, who sponsored his further education at the University of Vienna. It was at this time that he decided to become a priest and was ordained in 1827. He was then made prefect of studies at the seminary in Gratz.

Already a priest and doctor of theology, he joined the Society of Jesus in 1832 and in 1841 was sent to Innsbruck, where he taught theology, history, and Hebrew. As the Revolution of 1848 impeded his further usefulness at home, he left Europe and went to the United States.

During his forty years he visited almost every state of the Union, preaching in English, French, or German, as best suited the nationality of his hearers. In the year 1854 alone he delivered nearly a thousand sermons, and in 1864 he preached about forty-five missions. He retired to Cincinnati around 1882, where he died in 1888 at the age of 82.

== Works ==
He published forty works in German, sixteen in English, eight in French, three in Latin. Among his principal works are:

=== English ===
- Manual of the Catholic Religion (Ratisbon, 1858)
- Easter in Heaven (1863)
- Protestantism and Infidelity. An Appeal to Candid Americans (1861, 1864)
- On the Apostolical and Infallible Authority of the Pope, When Teaching the Faithful, and on his Relation to a General Council (1868)
- Photographic Views: or, Religious and Moral Truths Reflected in the Universe (1873)
- Reply to Hon. R.W. Thompson, Secretary of the Navy, Addressed to the American People (1877)
- Lives of the Saints, With a Practical Instruction on the Life of each Saint, for Every day in Year, v.2 (1877)
- Original, Short and Practical Sermons for Every Sunday of the Ecclesiastical Year (1881)

=== German ===
- Die apostolische Vollmacht des Papstes in Glaubens-Entscheidungen (1841)
- Ostern im Himmel (1866)
- Kleiner Kathechismus der Christlichen Lehre zum Gebrauch für Katholische Schulen (1866)
- Die Unfehlbarkeit des Papstes als Lehrer der Kirche (1869)
- Der monat Maria (1878)
- Vollstandiges Handbuch der Christ-Katholischen Religion, fur Katecheten, Lehrer (unknown)

=== French ===
- Catholicisme, Protestantisme et Infidélité : Appel aux Américains de Bonne Foi (1866)
