= Jacobs Prairie, Minnesota =

Jacobs Prairie
- Unincorporated community
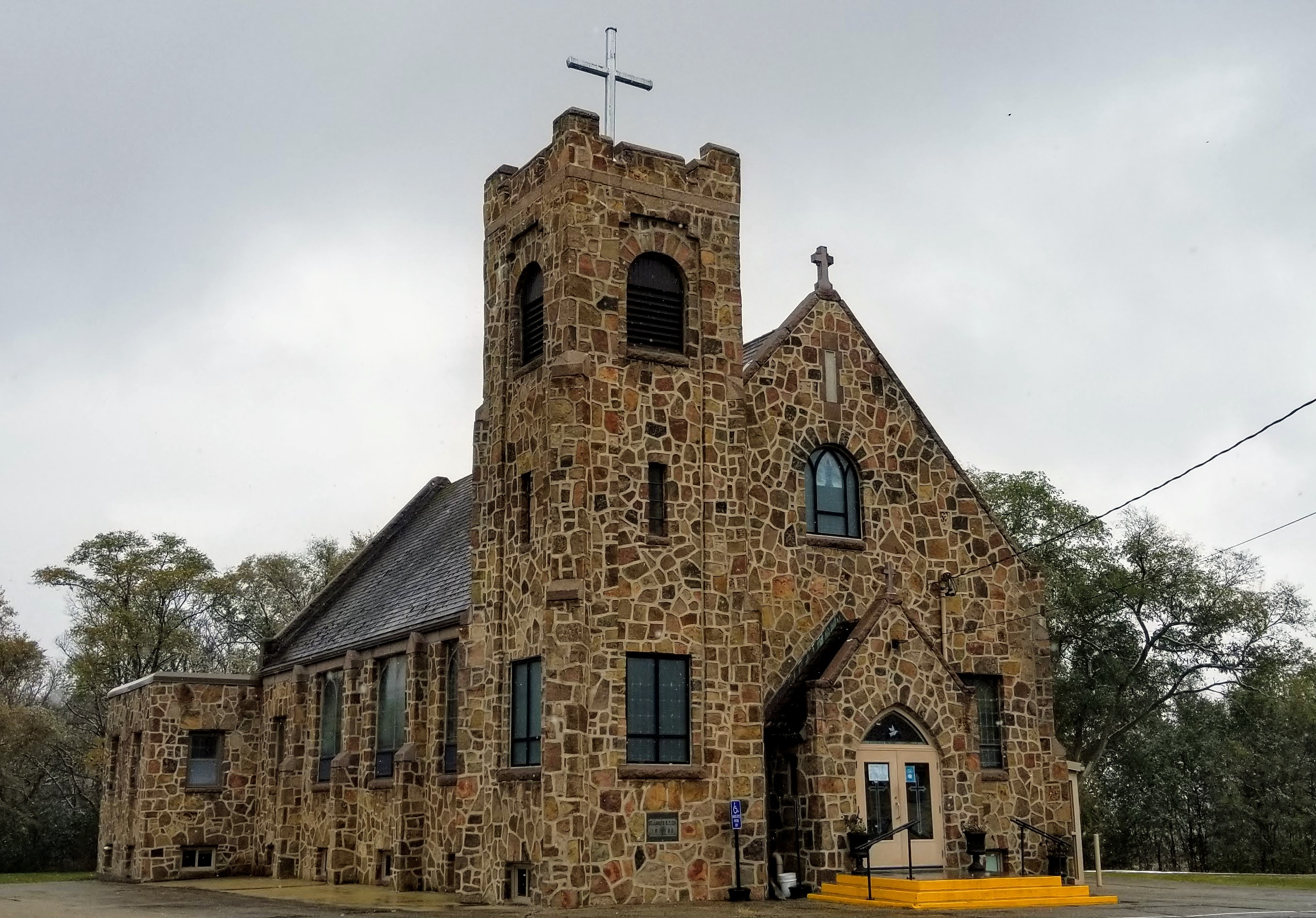
- St. James Catholic Church, 2020

- Location within Minnesota Location within the United States
- Coordinates: 45°29′13″N 94°23′35″W
- Country: United States
- State: Minnesota
- County: Stearns
- Township: Wakefield Township
- Elevation: 1,152 ft (351 m)
- Time zone: UTC-6 (Central (CST))
  - Summer (DST): UTC-5 (CDT)
- ZIP code: 56320
- Area code: 320
- GNIS feature ID: 645572

Jacobs Prairie is an unincorporated community in Wakefield Township, Stearns County, Minnesota, United States. The community is located along Stearns County Road 2 at Glacier Road near Cold Spring and Rockville.

== History ==
The community was homesteaded beginning in 1854 by German- and Luxembourgish-speaking Catholic settlers; including Bavarians, Eifelers, and Luxembourgers. The settlers were invited to the area by Slovenian Roman Catholic priest, missionary, and poet Fr. Francis Xavier Pierz, who had submitted letters and advertisements to the major German-language newspapers across the United States, like Der Wahrheitsfreund (The Friend of Truth), and in Europe, urging "good, pious" German Catholics to venture to the Sauk River Valley of central Minnesota. Fr. Pierz described the Sauk River Valley as a “land flowing with milk and honey” as well as safe from disease and anti-Catholic discrimination. The community's name derives from two of its earliest settlers, brothers Nicholas and Theodore Jacobs.

The community quickly established a country school, a blacksmith shop, and a church of simple means. The church, known as St. James Parish, served as a focal point for the settlers of Jacobs Prairie as well as settlers in neighboring areas, including St. Nicholas, Cold Spring, and Rockville. During the grasshopper plagues of 1856-57, the parishioners of St. James engaged in votive processions, seeking deliverance from the locusts. Twenty years later in August 1877, during another locust outbreak, the parishioners again engaged in procession, processing from Jacobs Prairie to a chapel specially built "to secure relief from the damage done by the hordes of grasshoppers" some four miles away just outside of Cold Spring known as Maria Hilf (currently known as Assumption Chapel). The German-language newspaper, Der Nordstern, published in St. Cloud covered the event, noting that the Jacobs Prairie pilgrims "were led by a wagon carrying the statue of the Virgin, and surrounding the wagon were twelve girls dressed in white and bearing white flags."

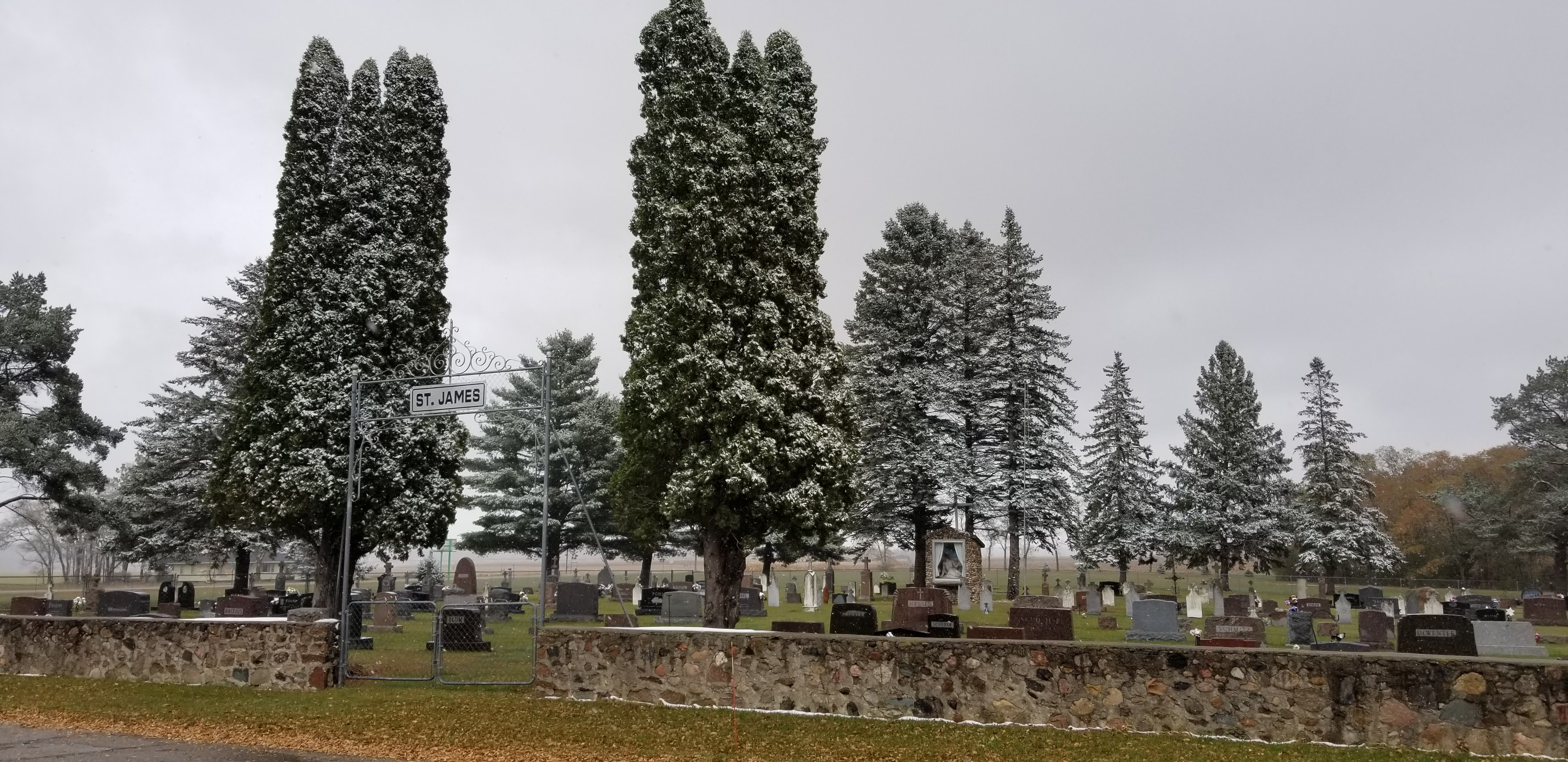
St. James Catholic Church cemetery, 2020

The establishment of individual parishes in Cold Spring, Richmond, and Rockville in the late 19th and early 20th centuries, plus the construction of a flour mill, brewery, and granite company in Cold Spring along the nearby Sauk River shifted populations and altered economic opportunities in Jacobs Prairie. The community largely comprises farmland, residences, and the St. James Parish. The current church, located on County Road 2 between St. Joseph and Cold Spring was built in 1931 and is the fifth building to be constructed for the community, which now consists of approximately seventy-five families and thirty-five singles, widows, and widowers; previous buildings were destroyed by cyclone or fire. St. James Parish has the distinction of being the oldest incorporated parish in the Catholic Diocese of St. Cloud west of the Mississippi River.
