= Henry Worrall (artist) =

English-American artist (1825–1902)

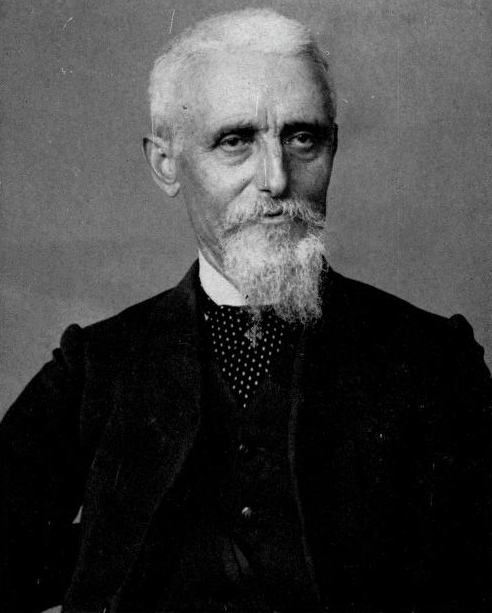
Portrait of Henry Worrall, ca.1890

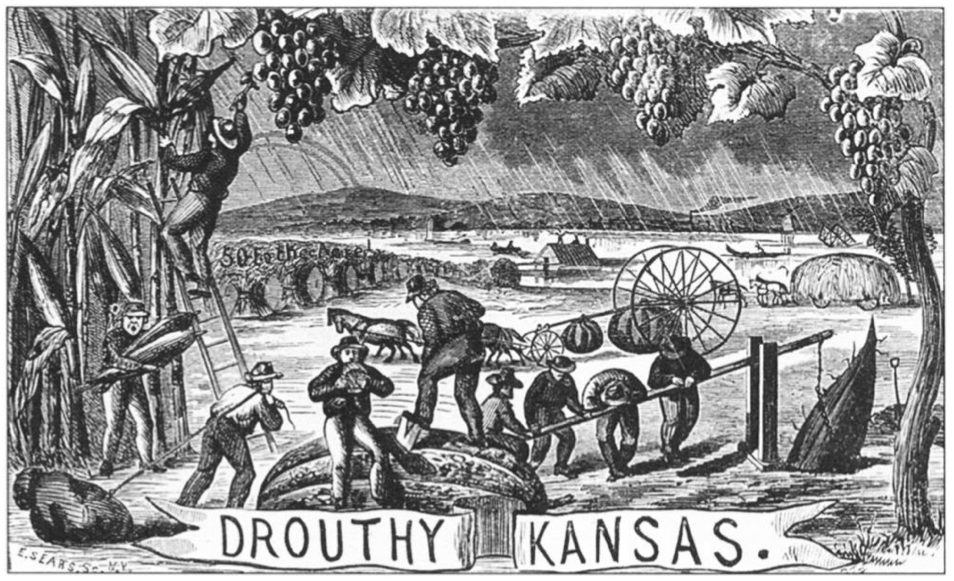
"Drouthy Kansas" (1869) by Worrall

Henry Worrall (1825–1902) was an American visual artist and musician in Ohio and Kansas in the 19th century. Born in Liverpool, England, he moved to the U.S. in the 1830s, working as "a newsboy in New York and Cincinnati." In Ohio he taught guitar at the Ohio Female College and co-founded the Cincinnati Sketch Club. He settled in Topeka in 1868 and may have been "the only regular subscriber to the London Punch in Kansas." Worrall designed the landscaping of Washburn College; and the Kansas exhibits at the Philadelphia Centennial in 1876, and the World's Columbian Exposition in 1893. Some of his musical compositions were published by Oliver Ditson in Boston and J.L. Peters & Bros. in St. Louis. He died in Kansas in 1902.

== Works ==
- Webb, William Edward (1873). Buffalo Land: An Authentic Account of the Discoveries, Adventures, and Mishaps of a Scientific and Sporting Party in the Wild West. Illustrated by Henry Worrall. Cincinnati, Ohio: E. Hannaford & Company. OCLC 21642209. OL 20492092M.
- McCoy, Joseph G. (1874). Historic sketches of the cattle trade of the West and Southwest. Kansas City, Mo: Ramsey, Millett & Hudson. OCLC 4405851. OL 234515M. Illustrations by Worrall on p.273 and p.303.
- Henry Worrall (July 5, 1879). "The Colored Exodus - Scenes in Topeka, Kansas (three engravings)". Harper's Weekly: 532–4.
- Henry Worrall (1884) [1856]. Worrall's Guitar School, or The Eclectic Guitar Instructor. Boston: Oliver Ditson Co.
