= Old Sartell Bridge =

Bridge in United States of America

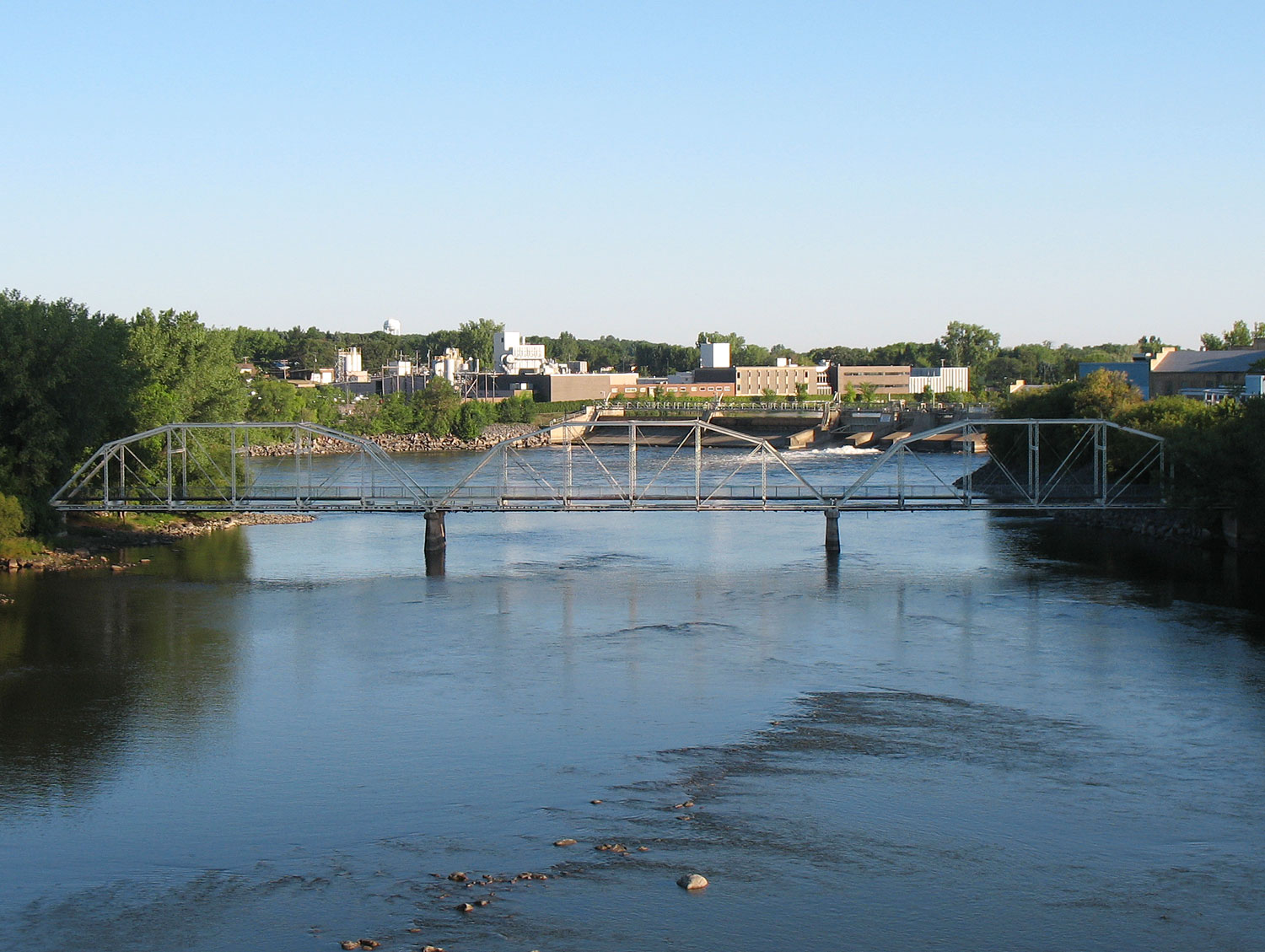
- The Old Sartell Bridge as viewed from the Sartell Bridge to the south.
- Coordinates: 45°37′05″N 94°12′11″W
- Carries: Utility lines and pedestrians
- Crosses: Mississippi River
- Locale: Sartell, Minnesota
- Maintained by: City of Sartell

Characteristics
- Design: 3 span Truss bridge
- Total length: 587 feet
- Width: 28 feet
- Longest span: 135 feet
- Clearance below: 18 feet

History
- Opened: 1914
- Closed: 1984 (reopened in 2023)

The Old Sartell Bridge is a bridge that spans the Mississippi River in the city of Sartell in the U.S. state of Minnesota. Though still standing, it is closed to traffic and was replaced by the Sartell Bridge constructed about 850 feet downstream. The bridge is around 1000 feet downstream of the Sartell Dam. The bridge was built during a six-month period in 1914, but over the years the bridge became congested and less able to carry heavy traffic. As early as 1957, heavy trucks were found to be too much for the span. When the new bridge was built in 1984, the old bridge was used as a pedestrian footbridge, but it became impractical for this use since there was a factory at the east end. The bridge was reopened for pedestrian traffic on June 9, 2023 with lookouts for fishing. It is accessible to pedestrians from the west and closed on the east end. It also carries utility lines.

The Old Sartell Bridge is a three span pin connected camelback through truss. The camelback design is a specific type of Parker truss, where the polygonal top chord is composed of exactly five sections. Each span of the Old Sartell Bridge is composed of six panels. The bridge is supported by concrete piers and abutments.

== See also ==
- List of crossings of the Upper Mississippi River
