= Fahnhorst =

Fahnhorst is a surname. Notable people with the surname include:

- Jim Fahnhorst (1958–2025), American football player
- Keith Fahnhorst (1952–2018), American football player
