= Watab River =

Tributary of the Mississippi River

Coordinates: 45°37′11″N 94°12′21″W

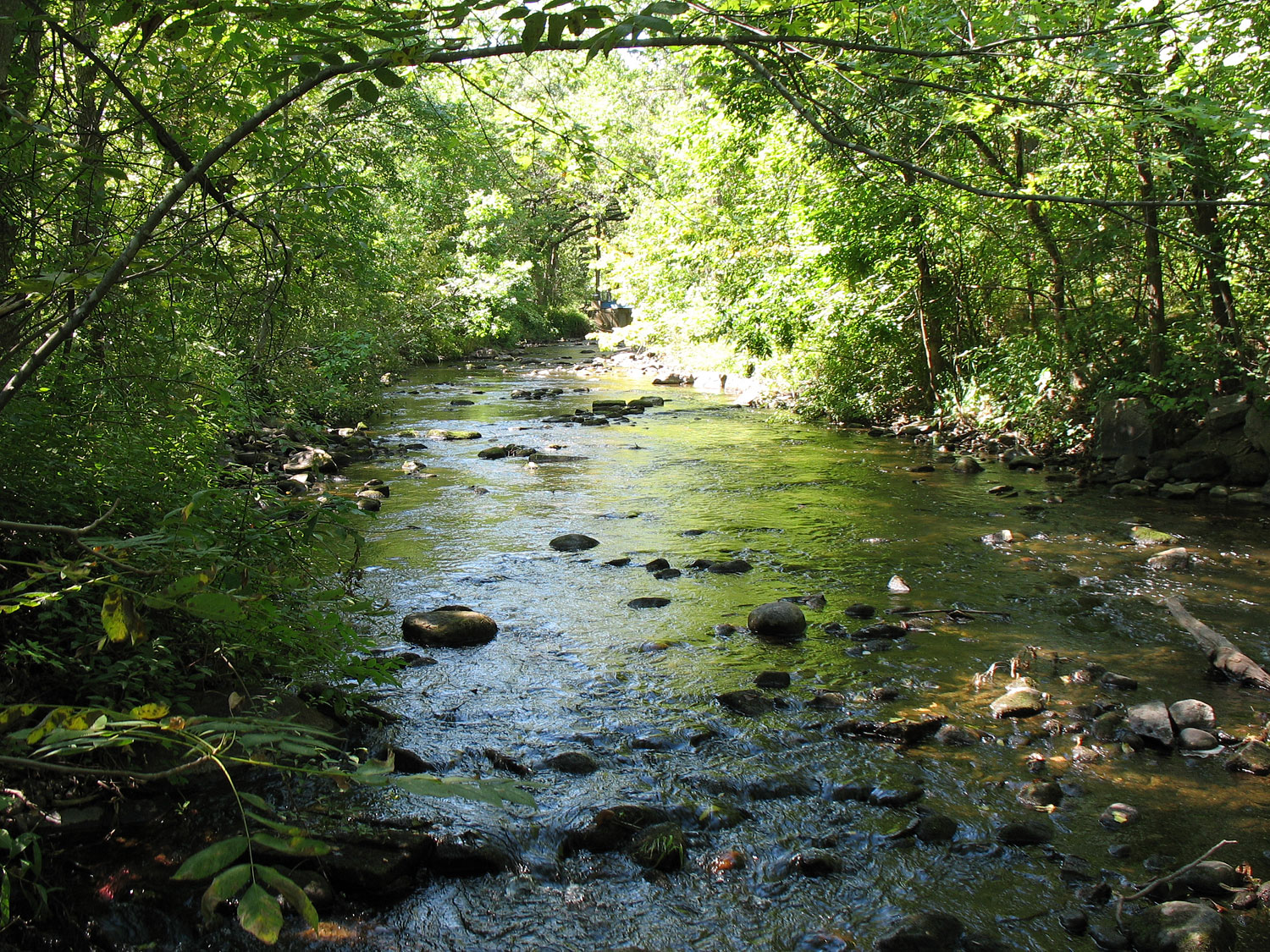
The Watab River as it passes through Sartell, Minnesota

The Watab River, also known as Watab Creek, is a 9.8-mile-long (15.8 km) tributary of the Mississippi River in Stearns County in central Minnesota in the United States. It rises north of St. Joseph at the confluence of its North and South Forks, and flows northeast through Watab Lake, then east into the Mississippi River at Sartell.

The North Fork Watab River, 6.9 miles (11.1 km) long, rises in Island Lake, a small creek feeds Pflueger Lake, flows northeasterly to Stumpf Lake, then southeasterly near Collegeville, merging with the South Fork near St. Joseph.

The South Fork Watab River, 12.7 miles (20.4 km) long, flows southeast from Big Watab Lake to Little Watab Lake, and through a pond before flowing northeast and into North Fork Watab River.

== History ==
The word watab comes from the Ojibwe language wadab-ziibi (Lit. "Spruce-Root River") due to the many spruce trees whose exposed roots were once commonly found along its banks. The name Watab comes from the word watap, as the cordage used for sewing together the birch-bark panels on the Ojibwe canoes was often made from spruce tree roots.

In 1825 the Watab River formed the first part of the border on the west side of the Mississippi between the Ojibwe people migrating from the north and the Dakota people to the south, and 20 years later the southern boundary for the Winnebago Reservation based in Long Prairie, Minnesota and lasting for less than ten years' duration. What is now the ghost town of Watab was located across the Mississippi River from the mouth of the Watab River.

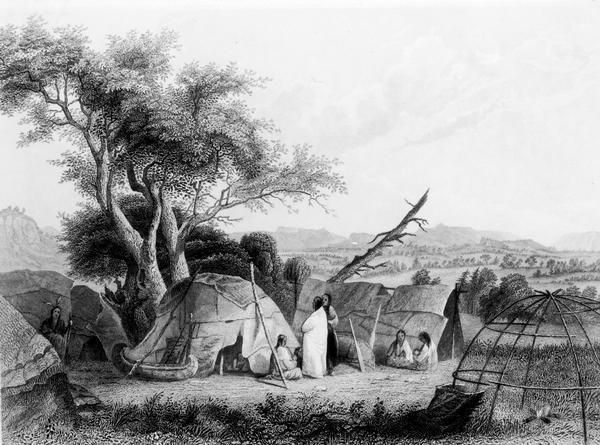
Winnebago family in 1852

Writing in 1915, journalist and local historian William Bell Mitchell recalled that as of 1850, "The Winnebagoes then had one of their main villages on the West bank of the Mississippi River, opposite Watab, and instead of remaining at home, were roaming around looking for a chance to play poker or some other gambling game, at which many of them were experts, or to obtain whiskey, for which they would give their last blanket. Sauk Rapids was then about two miles above the present village, where the fur company had their headquarters under the charge of Jeremiah Russell. Near the southwest corner of Stager's addition to Sauk Rapids was Calvin Potter's place, the primary attraction of which was a bar, and here were encounters between the Indians and White men, which resulted in the loss of life on both sides. One of these affairs in 1850 resulted in the sending of a party of government soldiers on the Governor Ramsey [steamboat] to Sauk Rapids, where a number of the Indians were arrested and taken to Watab, but afterwards released."

The Ho-Chunk stayed less than five years, moving again in 1853 50 miles south. Three years later they sold their grist and saw mills at the Watab River's mouth and moved south of Mankato. A 100-yard section of the old "Indian Trail" still remains just north of the creek's mouth albeit overgrown. The site of the village was still called "Winnebago" at the time of the 1866 ribbon map of the Mississippi River.

During the early years of pioneer settlement by Stearns County Germans, who were invited to the region by Fr. Francis Xavier Pierz, the valley made by the North Fork of the Watab River was named (German: Schönthal), meaning "Beautiful Valley." According to local historian Coleman J. Barry, the beauty of the Watab Valley has also inspired many works of locally composed German poetry.

== See also ==
- List of rivers of Minnesota
