= Apollo High School (Minnesota) =

- 1000 North 44th Avenue; St. Cloud, Minnesota 56303; United States

Information
- Type: Public
- Established: 1970
- School district: St. Cloud Area School District (742)
- Principal: Justin Skaalerud
- Staff: 76.55 (FTE)
- Grades: 9–12
- Enrollment: 1,230 (2023-2024)
- Student to teacher ratio: 16.07
- Colors: Red, White, and Blue
- Athletics conference: Central Lakes Conference
- Mascot: Eagles
- Website: apollo.isd742.org

Apollo High School is a high school located at 1000 44th Ave N. in Saint Cloud, Minnesota, United States. Apollo is one of the St. Cloud Area School District's two public high schools, the other being Technical High School. In 2016, about a quarter of the students were of Somali descent.

Apollo High's boundary includes, in addition to sections of St. Cloud: St. Joseph, St. John's University, Waite Park, sections of Sartell, and a very small portion of Rockville.

== Notable alumni ==
Stephen Sommers - Screenwriter and film director, best known for The Mummy and G.I. Joe.
