= St. Cloud Dam =

Dam in Minnesota, U.S.

Coordinates: 45°32′52″N 94°08′50″W

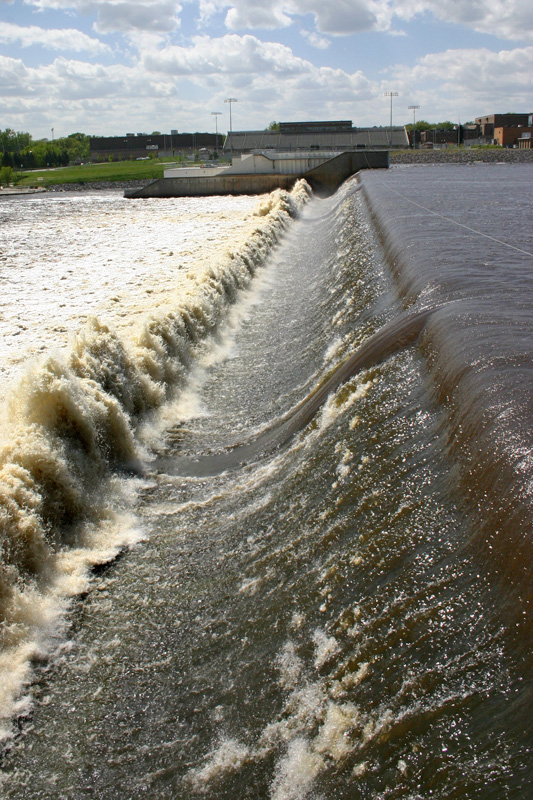
A side view of the St. Cloud Dam

The St. Cloud Dam is a dam across the Mississippi River in the town of St. Cloud, Minnesota, in the United States. The dam is 23.3 feet (7.1 m) high and features a three-foot (0.91 m) flip-up gate on its top to raise the water level and dragon's teeth at the bottom which are used to disperse energy. The dam also has two 4.5 MW turbines which generate electricity that is fed into the Xcel Energy power grid.

The original dam at this location dated from 1887, and ownership was transferred from Northern States Power to the city of St. Cloud in 1967. During reconstruction of the dam in 1970, a cofferdam was built upstream from the construction site to hold back Mississippi River waters. Due to a structural inadequacy, the cofferdam washed out on October 31, 1970. The energy of the impounded water caused extensive damage to the construction site and downstream areas.

The current dam was retrofitted to produce hydroelectric power, and is used by various hydrology classes at the adjacent St. Cloud State University to demonstrate hydrodynamic properties and to show how power is converted into electricity. It produces 8.5 megawatts and is the largest city-owned hydroelectric facility in the state.

The dam is located just south of University Drive SE, both connecting the Stearns County section of St. Cloud to the Sherburne County section.

Next dam upstream	Mississippi River	Next dam downstream
Sartell Dam	St. Cloud Dam	Coon Rapids Dam
