= Keith Fahnhorst =

American football player (1952–2018)

No. 71, 89
- Position: Offensive tackle

Personal information
- Born: February 6, 1952; St. Cloud, Minnesota, U.S.
- Died: June 12, 2018 (aged 66); Eden Prairie, Minnesota, U.S.
- Listed height: 6 ft 6 in (1.98 m)
- Listed weight: 273 lb (124 kg)

Career information
- High school: St. Cloud Technical
- College: Minnesota
- NFL draft: 1974: 2nd round, 35th overall pick

Career history
- San Francisco 49ers (1974–1987)

Awards and highlights
- 2× Super Bowl champion (XVI, XIX); 2× First-team All-Pro (1983, 1984); Second-team All-Pro (1985); Pro Bowl (1984); First-team All-Big Ten (1973)

Career NFL statistics
- Games played: 193
- Games started: 160
- Kicking yards: 13
- Kick returns: 1
- Fumble recoveries: 3
- Receptions: 1
- Stats at Pro Football Reference

Keith Victor Fahnhorst (February 6, 1952 – June 12, 2018) was an American professional football offensive tackle for the San Francisco 49ers of the National Football League (NFL) from 1974 through 1987. He played college football for the Minnesota Golden Gophers, Fahnhorst, a 273 pound lineman, led the 49ers in seniority and appeared in Super Bowl XVI and Super Bowl XIX games.

Fahnhorst's younger brother Jim Fahnhorst played linebacker in the USFL and for the 49ers from 1984 to 1990. The brothers were teammates on the 1984 49ers team that won Super Bowl XIX and finished with a 15–1 record.

== Personal life ==
Fahnhorst married Susan Kluska in 1974. They had three daughters, Tiffany, Brittney, and Courtney. Tiffany is a financial advisor in Minnesota. Courtney is a doctor in Jacksonville, FL.

Fahnhorst retired from pro football because of a neck injury that caused him to miss nine games during the 1987 season. He moved to Minneapolis to work as a stockbroker.

Fahnhorst received a lifesaving kidney transplant in 2003.

Fahnhorst died June 12, 2018, at the age 66.
