= Sartell Bridge =

Bridge in United States of America

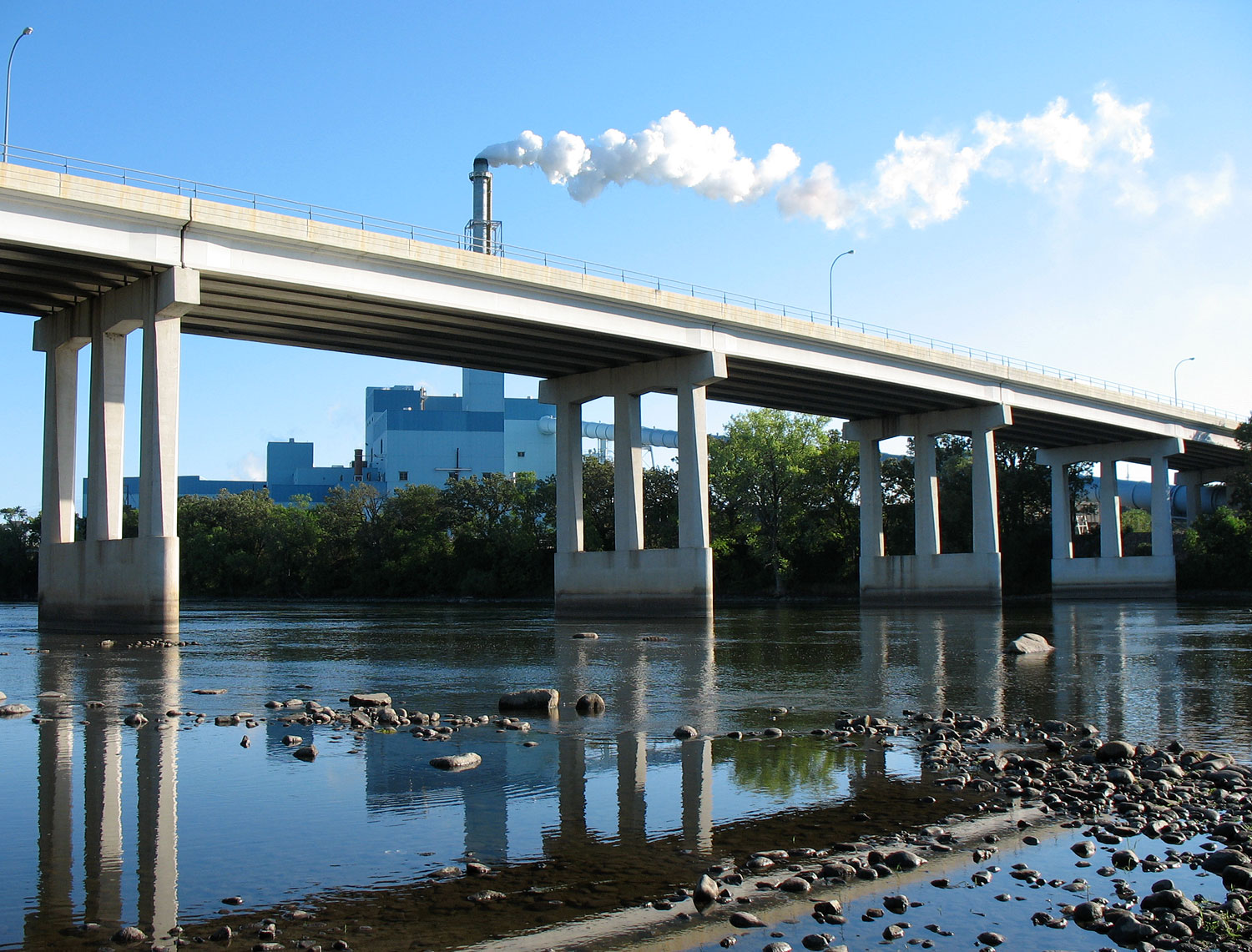
- The Sartell Bridge as viewed from the west bank of the Mississippi, south of the bridge.
- Coordinates: 45°36′58″N 94°12′05″W
- Carries: Two lanes of Benton County Road 29 and Stearns County Road 78, pedestrians
- Crosses: Mississippi River, BNSF Railway, Stearns County Road 1
- Locale: Sartell, Minnesota
- Maintained by: Benton County
- ID number: 05525

Characteristics
- Design: Precast concrete girder bridge
- Total length: 1173 feet
- Width: 52 feet
- Longest span: 116 feet
- Clearance below: 58 feet

History
- Opened: 1984

The Sartell Bridge is a bridge that spans the Mississippi River in the city of Sartell in the U.S. state of Minnesota. The bridge also spans a roadway, property belonging to the Sartell paper mill, and a rail line on the east side of the river.

== See also ==
- List of crossings of the Upper Mississippi River
