= St. Cloud Area School District =

School district in Minnesota, United States

St. Cloud Area School District 742 is a school district headquartered in St. Cloud, Minnesota.

It is also known as District 742 Community Schools.

The 15th largest school district in Minnesota, it serves nine communities including St. Cloud, Clearwater, Clear Lake, Collegeville, Luxemburg, Pleasant Lake, St. Augusta, St. Joseph and Waite Park.

== History ==
In 2016, the district had about 10,000 students.

From 2001 to 2016, the number of students who were learning English as a second language increased by 3.5 times. In 2016, it had around 2,000 students categorized as such, with many being from Somalia.

Willie Jett served as superintendent until he retired in 2021.

Laurie Putnam became the superintendent in 2021, making her the district's first female superintendent. All of the members of the board of education voted to hire her.

== District boundary ==
In Stearns County the district includes the county's portions of St. Cloud and Clearwater, all of St. Joseph, St. John's University, and Waite Park, most of St. Augusta, and sections of Rockville and Sartell.

In Sherburne County the district includes the county's portion of St. Cloud and the majority portion of Clear Lake.

In Benton County the district includes the majority of that county's part of St. Cloud.

In Wright County the district includes the county's portion of Clearwater.

== Schools ==
High schools

- Apollo High School
- Technical Senior High School
- McKinley-Adult Learning Center

PK-8 schools

- Kennedy Community School

Middle schools

- North Middle School
- South Middle School

Elementary schools

- Clearview Elementary School
- Discovery Elementary School
- Lincoln Elementary School
- Madison Elementary School
- Oak Hill Elementary School
- Talahi Elementary School
- Westwood Elementary School

Former schools:

- McKinley Elementary School
- Roosevelt Elementary School
