= Pleasant Lake, Minnesota =

- Neighborhood
- Location of the neighborhood of Pleasant Lake within the city of Rockville, Stearns County
- Coordinates: 45°29′46″N 94°17′24″W
- Country: United States
- State: Minnesota
- County: Stearns County

Area
  - Total: 0.77 sq mi (2.0 km^{2})
  - Land: 0.77 sq mi (2.0 km^{2})
  - Water: 0 sq mi (0.0 km^{2})
- Elevation: 1,106 ft (337 m)

Population (2000)
  - Total: 504
  - Density: 641/sq mi (247.6/km^{2})
- Time zone: UTC-6 (Central (CST))
  - Summer (DST): UTC-5 (CDT)
- FIPS code: 27-51586
- GNIS feature ID: 0649561

Pleasant Lake is a neighborhood of the city of Rockville in Stearns County, Minnesota, United States. The population was 504 at the 2000 census. Pleasant Lake was settled about 1890 and incorporated on July 11, 1938. On 1 June 2002, the city of Pleasant Lake and Rockville Township were merged into the city of Rockville.

The 400 Supper Club

== Geography ==
According to the United States Census Bureau, the city had a total area of 0.8 square miles (2.1 km^{2}), all land.

== Demographics ==
As of the census of 2000, there were 504 people, 174 households, and 137 families residing in the city. The population density was 641.2 inhabitants per square mile (247.6/km^{2}). There were 179 housing units at an average density of 227.7 per square mile (87.9/km^{2}). The racial makeup of the city was 97.42% White, 0.79% African American, 0.20% Native American, 0.40% Asian, 0.20% from other races, and 0.99% from two or more races. Hispanic or Latino of any race were 0.40% of the population.

There were 174 households, out of which 47.7% had children under the age of 18 living with them, 73.0% were married couples living together, 4.0% had a female householder with no husband present, and 20.7% were non-families. 17.2% of all households were made up of individuals, and 4.0% had someone living alone who was 65 years of age or older. The average household size was 2.90 and the average family size was 3.30.

In the city the population was spread out, with 31.9% under the age of 18, 5.4% from 18 to 24, 35.3% from 25 to 44, 20.8% from 45 to 64, and 6.5% who were 65 years of age or older. The median age was 36 years. For every 100 females, there were 107.4 males. For every 100 females age 18 and over, there were 103.0 males.

The median income for a household in the city was $56,346, and the median income for a family was $63,750. Males had a median income of $44,167 versus $26,579 for females. The per capita income for the city was $28,811. None of the families and 1.4% of the population were living below the poverty line, including no under eighteens and 4.9% of those over 64.
