= Rockville, Minnesota =

City in Minnesota, United States

Rockville
- City
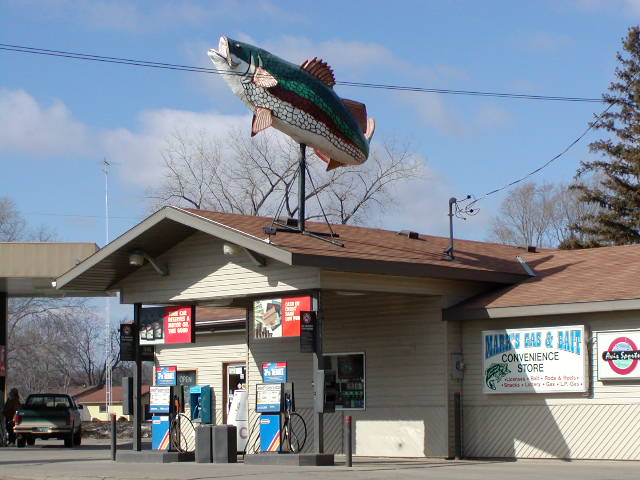
- Motto: "Granite-Heart Of The City"
- Location of Rockville within Stearns County, Minnesota
- Coordinates: 45°27′55″N 94°19′19″W
- Country: United States
- State: Minnesota
- County: Stearns

Area
  - Total: 30.43 sq mi (78.82 km^{2})
  - Land: 28.68 sq mi (74.29 km^{2})
  - Water: 1.75 sq mi (4.53 km^{2})
- Elevation: 1,125 ft (343 m)

Population (2020)
  - Total: 2,382
  - Density: 83.1/sq mi (32.07/km^{2})
- Time zone: UTC-6 (Central (CST))
  - Summer (DST): UTC-5 (CDT)
- ZIP code: 56369
- Area code: 320
- FIPS code: 27-55078
- GNIS feature ID: 2396409
- Website: https://rockvillemn.gov/

Rockville is a city in Stearns County, Minnesota, United States. The population was 2,382 as of the 2020 census. It is part of the St. Cloud Metropolitan Statistical Area.

== History ==
According to the local oral tradition, a village of the Dakota people was once located to the north of the lake.

The parish cemetery in nearby Jacobs Prairie, Minnesota includes the grave of early Rockville pioneer Michael Hanson, Sr. Hanson was already an elderly immigrant when he arrived as a homesteader with his sons and many of his grandchildren from the Luxembourgish-speaking but Prussian-ruled village of Obersgegen. Hanson was old enough, in fact, to have been a combat veteran of the French Imperial Army who had lost a leg to enemy fire during the Napoleonic Wars. As stipulated in his last request, Hanson lies buried in St. James Cemetery next to his close friend, pioneer settler, and fellow Napoleonic Wars veteran, Herr Pieck.

Rockville was platted in 1856, and named for granite rock formations on nearby streams. A post office has been in operation at Rockville since 1857. Levi Gaylord was selected as the first Postmaster. The Government selected Newton Smith on June 6, 1861. In Rockville the Clark and McCormack Quarry and House, consisting of a quarry established in 1907 and a house built in 1924, is listed on the National Register of Historic Places.

On June 1, 2002, the city of Pleasant Lake and Rockville Township were merged into the city of Rockville.

== Geography ==
According to the United States Census Bureau, the city has a total area of 30.17 square miles (78.14 km^{2}); 28.42 square miles (73.61 km^{2}) is land and 1.75 square miles (4.53 km^{2}) is water.

Rockville, including the former Rockville Township, is located in Township 123 North of the Arkansas Base Line and Range 29 West of the Fifth Principal Meridian.

== Demographics ==
Historical population
Census	Pop.	Note	%±
1910	127		—
1920	172		35.4%
1930	294		70.9%
1940	345		17.3%
1950	288		−16.5%
1960	357		24.0%
1970	302		−15.4%
1980	597		97.7%
1990	579		−3.0%
2000	749		29.4%
2010	2,448		226.8%
2020	2,382		−2.7%
U.S. Decennial Census

=== 2020 census ===
As of the 2020 census, Rockville had a population of 2,382. The median age was 43.4 years. 22.6% of residents were under the age of 18 and 17.8% of residents were 65 years of age or older. For every 100 females there were 107.9 males, and for every 100 females age 18 and over there were 109.7 males age 18 and over.

32.0% of residents lived in urban areas, while 68.0% lived in rural areas.

There were 923 households in Rockville, of which 27.3% had children under the age of 18 living in them. Of all households, 67.8% were married-couple households, 15.6% were households with a male householder and no spouse or partner present, and 11.6% were households with a female householder and no spouse or partner present. About 19.5% of all households were made up of individuals and 7.2% had someone living alone who was 65 years of age or older.

There were 1,044 housing units, of which 11.6% were vacant. The homeowner vacancy rate was 0.4% and the rental vacancy rate was 8.2%.

Racial composition as of the 2020 census
Race	Number	Percent
White	2,122	89.1%
Black or African American	7	0.3%
American Indian and Alaska Native	3	0.1%
Asian	6	0.3%
Native Hawaiian and Other Pacific Islander	0	0.0%
Some other race	154	6.5%
Two or more races	90	3.8%
Hispanic or Latino (of any race)	213	8.9%

=== 2010 census ===
As of the census of 2010, there were 2,448 people, 880 households, and 703 families living in the city. The population density was 86.1 inhabitants per square mile (33.2/km^{2}). There were 1,041 housing units at an average density of 36.6 per square mile (14.1/km^{2}). The racial makeup of the city was 91.9% White, 0.3% African American, 0.2% Native American, 0.2% Asian, 0.5% Pacific Islander, 6.1% from other races, and 0.8% from two or more races. Hispanic or Latino of any race were 9.3% of the population.

There were 880 households, of which 37.0% had children under the age of 18 living with them, 68.8% were married couples living together, 6.5% had a female householder with no husband present, 4.7% had a male householder with no wife present, and 20.1% were non-families. 14.4% of all households were made up of individuals, and 4.8% had someone living alone who was 65 years of age or older. The average household size was 2.78 and the average family size was 3.04.

The median age in the city was 40.5 years. 25.8% of residents were under the age of 18; 8.2% were between the ages of 18 and 24; 23.5% were from 25 to 44; 31.1% were from 45 to 64; and 11.4% were 65 years of age or older. The gender makeup of the city was 51.9% male and 48.1% female.

=== 2000 census ===
As of the census of 2000, there were 749 people, 268 households, and 187 families living in the city. The population density was 1,140.7 inhabitants per square mile (440.4/km^{2}). There were 281 housing units at an average density of 427.9 per square mile (165.2/km^{2}). The racial makeup of the city was 94.53% White, 1.34% African American, 0.13% Native American, 3.20% from other races, and 0.80% from two or more races. Hispanic or Latino of any race were 6.54% of the population.

There were 268 households, out of which 44.8% had children under the age of 18 living with them, 58.2% were married couples living together, 7.1% had a female householder with no husband present, and 30.2% were non-families. 23.1% of all households were made up of individuals, and 6.3% had someone living alone who was 65 years of age or older. The average household size was 2.79 and the average family size was 3.33.

In the city, the population was spread out, with 31.5% under the age of 18, 11.1% from 18 to 24, 37.0% from 25 to 44, 13.9% from 45 to 64, and 6.5% who were 65 years of age or older. The median age was 29 years. For every 100 females, there were 106.3 males. For every 100 females age 18 and over, there were 113.8 males.

The median income for a household in the city was $43,854, and the median income for a family was $50,083. Males had a median income of $31,964 versus $22,000 for females. The per capita income for the city was $16,527. About 2.1% of families and 4.8% of the population were below the poverty line, including 3.0% of those under age 18 and none of those age 65 or over.

== Infrastructure ==
=== Transportation ===
Minnesota State Highway 23 serves as a main route in the city, and Interstate 94 passes nearby. Also a branch line of Northern Lines Railway terminates in Rockville and serves the Wenner Gas propane terminal just north of the city boundary. The through rail line to Willmar, Minnesota was abandoned in the 1980s by Burlington Northern Railroad.

== Education ==
Much of Rockville is in the Rocori Public School District. Portions are in the St. Cloud Area School District.

Residents of the St. Cloud school district portion are zoned to Discovery Elementary School. Almost all of the St. Cloud school district sections of Rockville are zoned to South Middle School, and Technical Senior High School. A small slice of land north of Highway 23 is zoned to North Middle School, and Apollo High School.
