= Sartell, Minnesota =

City in Minnesota, United States

Sartell
- City
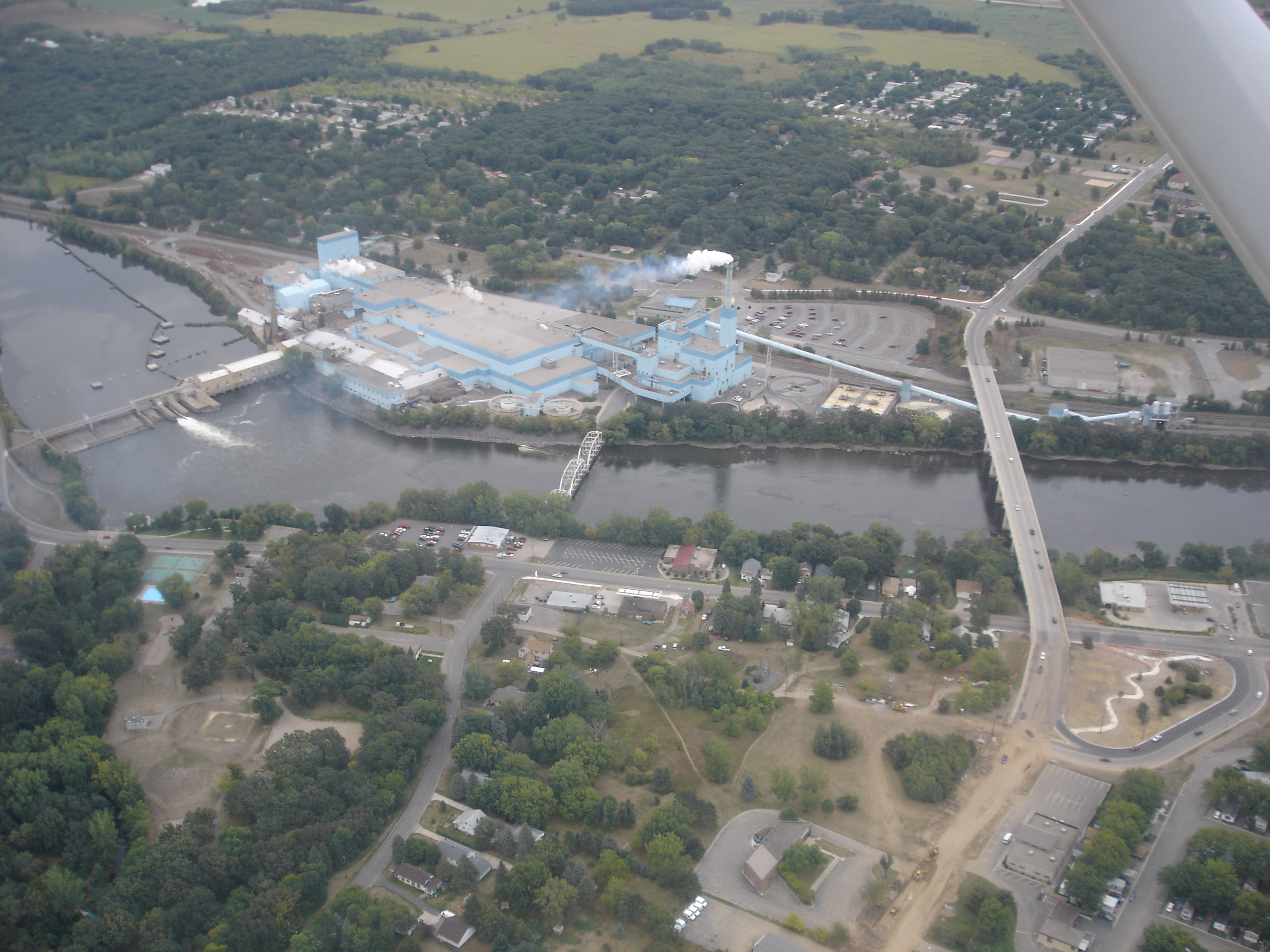
- Sartell in 2007

- Seal
- Motto: "A Great Place To Live"
- Location of Sartell within Stearns and Benton Counties in the state of Minnesota
- Coordinates: 45°37′08″N 94°13′14″W
- Country: United States
- State: Minnesota
- Counties: Stearns, Benton
- Incorporated: 1907

Government
  - Mayor: Ryan Fitzthum

Area
  - Total: 10.42 sq mi (27.00 km^{2})
  - Land: 10.17 sq mi (26.33 km^{2})
  - Water: 0.26 sq mi (0.67 km^{2})
- Elevation: 1,037 ft (316 m)

Population (2020)
  - Total: 19,351
  - Estimate (2022): 19,696
  - Density: 1,903.6/sq mi (734.98/km^{2})
- Time zone: UTC-6 (Central (CST))
  - Summer (DST): UTC-5 (CDT)
- ZIP code: 56377
- Area code: 320
- FIPS code: 27-58612
- GNIS feature ID: 2396539
- Website: sartellmn.com

Sartell is a city in Benton and Stearns Counties in the U.S. state of Minnesota that straddles the Mississippi River. It is part of the St. Cloud metropolitan area. The population was 19,351 at the 2020 census, making it St. Cloud's most populous suburb and the fourth-largest city in central Minnesota, after St. Cloud, Elk River, and Willmar.

== History ==
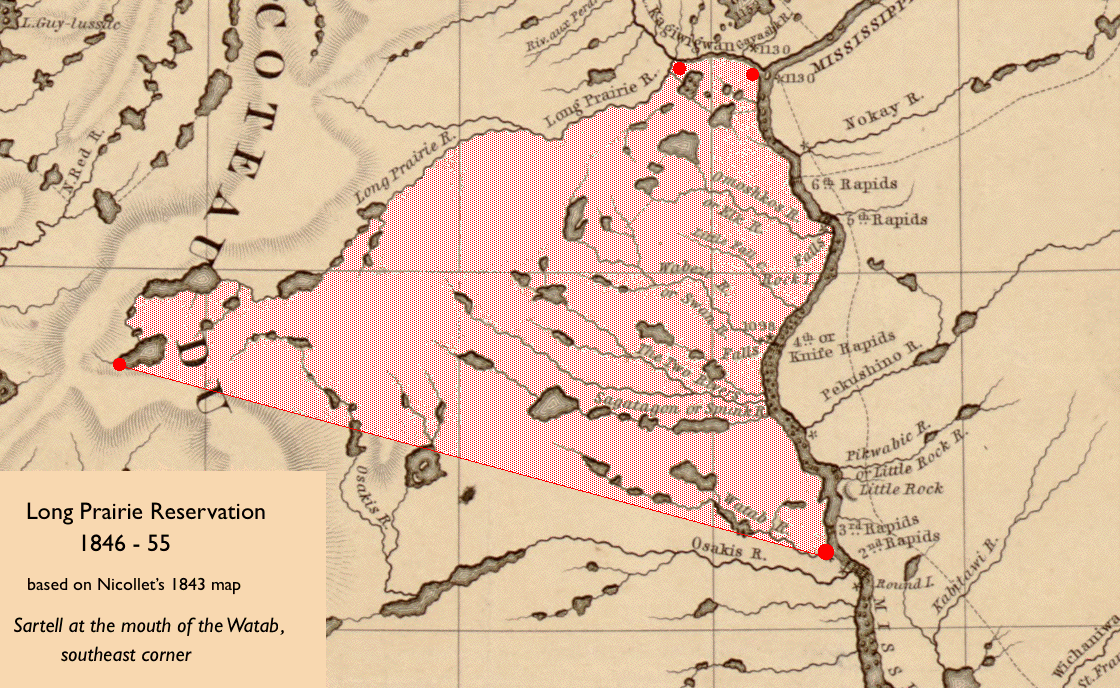
Winnebago 1846 Reservation, Nicollet's 1843 map

The first known Native American tribe in the area now known as Sartell were the Dakota. Greysolon du Luht ("Duluth") visited the large Mdewakantonwan village Izatys on Mille Lacs Lake in 1679. As the Anishinaabe people moved westward around Lake Superior and into the interior away from the Europeans in the 18th century, they pushed the neighboring Sioux/Dakota people to their west—in present-day Minnesota—farther south and west away from them. By 1820 the Chippewa/Anishinaabe controlled all of northern Minnesota, but raids between them and the Dakota to the south continued. The area later named Sartell was an intertribal no man's land when French fur traders and British geographers first descended the Mississippi River from the Anishinaabe north (Jean-Baptiste Perrault 1789, David Thompson 1798), and American explorers ascended the river from the Sioux south (Zebulon Pike 1805, Lewis Cass 1820, Henry Schoolcraft 1832, Joseph Nicollet 1836).

The Watab Creek in Sartell marked part of the border between the Anishinaabe to the north and the Dakota to the south, who had lived farther north and east before the Anishinaabe's westward migrations. The U.S. legally established this border in its 1825 Treaty with the tribes at Prairie du Chien, which established a demarcation line between the Sioux and the Ojibwe at "the mouth of the first river which enters the Mississippi on its west side above the mouth of Sac (Sauk) river; thence ascending the said river (above the mouth of Sac river)".

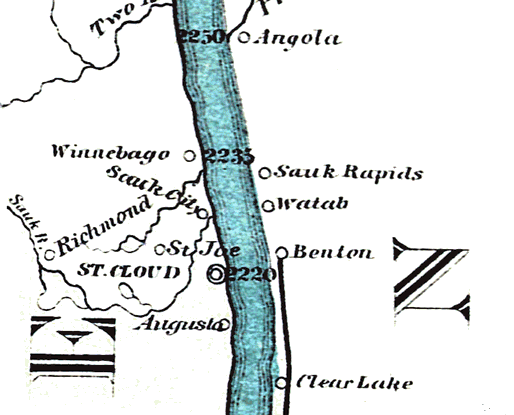
segment of map showing "Winnebago" at mile 2235 of the 1866 Mississippi River ribbon map by Coloney and Fairchild, St Louis.

In 1846, 1,300 Ho-Chunk people were moved to the Sartell area, followed by the Chippewa/Anishinaabe sale of the area north of the Watab River and west of the Mississippi to the U.S. In 1848, more members of the Ho-Chunk/Winnebago tribe (related Dakotan speakers) were moved by order of the U.S. government to the mouth of the Watab Creek, now called the Long Prairie reservation, to serve as a human buffer between the warring Dakota and Anishinaabe. Unhappy living between two warring tribes, the Ho-Chunk stayed less than five years, moving again in 1853 to more peaceful territory 50 miles south on the Mississippi. Three years later they sold their grist and saw mills and moved south of Mankato. A 100-yard section of the old "Indian Trail" still remains just north of the creek's mouth albeit overgrown. The area was known as "Winnebago" at the time of the 1866 ribbon map of the Mississippi River.

Sartell got its start as a small American town on the Mississippi River with lumber and a paper company as its main industries. The city's present site was originally called "The Third Rapids", as it was the third set of rough waters that French fur traders encountered as they traveled north from Saint Anthony Falls in Minneapolis.

Sartell's paper mill, as viewed from the air in 1946.

One of the first white people to settle in the fledgling town was Joseph B. Sartell, who arrived in 1854 and worked as a millwright at a local sawmill. In 1877, he opened a flour mill at the nearby Watab River, and in 1884 he started Sartell Brothers Lumber Company with his sons.

In 1905, construction began on both the Sartell Pulp and Paper Company and the Sartell Dam across the Mississippi, near the "third rapids". Both were completed in 1907, the dam project having claimed the lives of seven workers. Watab Pulp and Paper was rebuilt and expanded through the years, passing through multiple ownerships and eventually emerging as Verso Paper's Sartell mill, the city's largest employer.

In 1907, residents of the town decided to incorporate. Several influential people felt the town ought to be named Wengert, after a local businessman. But because of Joseph Sartell's many relatives and generous contributions to the community, the town was incorporated as "The Village of Sartell" in his honor. From 1907 until 1973 there was a Sartell on nearly every City Council, the most prominent being Ripley "Rip" B. Sartell, store owner and mayor for 31 years.

The village continued to grow slowly, developing a number of businesses and a downtown on the east side of the Mississippi along U.S. Highway 10. In the 1960s, the highway was rerouted farther east, contributing to the downtown's demise. In 1973 the Minnesota Legislature required all municipal designations be changed to "city", so "the Village of Sartell" became "the City of Sartell". The construction of the Sartell Bridge over the Mississippi in the early 1980s replaced the remaining businesses. This and Sartell's location near St. Cloud's major retail center account for its lack of a traditional "downtown".

Independent School District 748, Sartell-St. Stephen, was created in 1969 because residents wanted to educate their children locally. Despite the lack of a downtown, the city continued to grow at an increasing pace in the 1970s. From 1960 to the present, the city's population has gone from 700 to over 18,000.

== Economy ==
Sartell's largest employers have been the paper mill that started in 1907 as Watab Pulp & Paper, became St. Regis Paper Company in 1947, and then Verso Paper Sartell Mill, and DeZurik Water Controls, whose valve production plant is in Sartell. The city also hosts a number of small businesses, including gas stations, restaurants, grocery stores, and salons. In 2012 the Verso Paper mill was severely damaged by an explosion and, due also to decreasing paper demand, was shut down and sold for parts. More recently the city has begun to urbanize, adding larger chain businesses in a newly developed area eventually to be a new downtown.

== Law and government ==
Sartell's city council consists of a mayor and four members elected at large. Sartell's mayor is Ryan Fitzthum, and the council members are Jill Smith, Alex Lewandowski, Tim Elness, and Jeff Kolb. They possess the authority to pass and enforce ordinances, establish public and administrative policies, create advisory boards and commissions, and manage the city's financial operations, including preparing a budget, auditing expenditures, and transacting other city business as required by law. The city council also appoints a city administrator, who oversees the city's daily operation and implements the policies of the council.

City recreational facilities include 24 parks, miles of paved walking paths, playgrounds, a bike lane, tennis courts, baseball and soccer fields, ice rinks, a golf course and a wading pool.

== Religion ==
The Sartell family was largely Presbyterian, and helped organize the first church in the town, Riverside Presbyterian, on the west bank of the Mississippi River about one mile north of the town's (then) sole stop sign, to serve the Sunday interests of local Protestants. Saint Francis Xavier Church, Roman Catholic, was founded in 1948, named after Francis Xavier Pierz, a Slovenian missionary to Native Americans in the area, and largely responsible for attracting the large population of Slovenian, Polish, Czech, Slovak and especially German farmers to the area.

== Transportation ==
Transportation to and from Sartell is limited to surface roads, mainly U.S. Highway 10 and Minnesota State Highway 15, both of which pass along the outskirts of the city. St. Cloud Metro Bus service runs to destinations in Sartell and neighboring Sauk Rapids.

The city's proximity to St. Cloud allows for convenient access to St. Cloud Regional Airport, as well as the city's Amtrak and Greyhound stations.

The dams along the Mississippi River and the waterway's relative shallowness render it useless for anything more than recreational watercraft traffic. Sartell's location on the river facilitated the construction of the Old Sartell Bridge in 1914, which was replaced by the current Sartell Bridge in 1984.

== Geography ==
According to the United States Census Bureau, the city has an area of 10.05 square miles (26.03 km^{2}); 9.80 square miles (25.38 km^{2}) is land and 0.25 square miles (0.65 km^{2}) is water.

U.S. Highway 10, Minnesota State Highway 15, and County 1 are three of Sartell's main routes. Other nearby routes in the St. Cloud area include Interstate 94/U.S. Highway 52, Minnesota State Highway 23, and County 75. Sartell is immediately north of St. Cloud.

The city is on the Mississippi River, with the surrounding undeveloped property composed mainly of woodlands and farmland.

== Demographics ==
Historical population
Census	Pop.	Note	%±
1910	240		—
1920	510		112.5%
1930	521		2.2%
1940	532		2.1%
1950	662		24.4%
1960	791		19.5%
1970	1,323		67.3%
1980	3,427		159.0%
1990	5,393		57.4%
2000	9,641		78.8%
2010	15,876		64.7%
2020	19,351		21.9%
2022 (est.)	19,696		1.8%
U.S. Decennial Census; 2020 Census

=== Racial and ethnic composition ===
Sartell, Minnesota - Demographic Profile (NH = Non-Hispanic)
Race / Ethnicity	Pop 2000	Pop 2010	Pop 2020	% 2000	% 2010	% 2020
White alone (NH)	9,333	15,033	17,142	96.81%	94.69%	88.59%
Black or African American alone (NH)	28	135	362	0.29%	0.85%	1.87%
Native American or Alaska Native alone (NH)	14	22	58	0.15%	0.14%	0.30%
Asian alone (NH)	113	243	467	1.17%	1.53%	2.41%
Pacific Islander alone (NH)	1	3	3	0.01%	0.02%	0.02%
Some Other Race alone (NH)	6	12	38	0.06%	0.08%	0.20%
Mixed Race/Multi-Racial (NH)	62	200	755	0.62%	1.26%	3.90%
Hispanic or Latino (any race)	84	228	526	0.87%	1.44%	2.72%
Total	9,641	15,876	19,351	100.00%	100.00%	100.00%

Note: the US Census treats Hispanic/Latino as an ethnic category. This table excludes Latinos from the racial categories and assigns them to a separate category. Hispanics/Latinos can be of any race.

=== 2020 census ===
As of the 2020 census, Sartell had a population of 19,351. The median age was 35.3 years. 28.4% of residents were under the age of 18 and 13.7% of residents were 65 years of age or older. For every 100 females there were 91.9 males, and for every 100 females age 18 and over there were 88.2 males age 18 and over.

96.5% of residents lived in urban areas, while 3.5% lived in rural areas.

There were 7,386 households in Sartell, of which 37.7% had children under the age of 18 living in them. Of all households, 51.2% were married-couple households, 15.1% were households with a male householder and no spouse or partner present, and 25.6% were households with a female householder and no spouse or partner present. About 27.6% of all households were made up of individuals and 11.2% had someone living alone who was 65 years of age or older.

There were 7,602 housing units, of which 2.8% were vacant. The homeowner vacancy rate was 1.0% and the rental vacancy rate was 3.1%.

Racial composition as of the 2020 census
Race	Number	Percent
White	17,260	89.2%
Black or African American	372	1.9%
American Indian and Alaska Native	72	0.4%
Asian	470	2.4%
Native Hawaiian and Other Pacific Islander	3	0.0%
Some other race	228	1.2%
Two or more races	946	4.9%
Hispanic or Latino (of any race)	526	2.7%

=== 2010 census ===
As of the census of 2010, there were 15,876 people, 5,859 households, and 4,060 families residing in the city. The population density was 1,620.0 inhabitants per square mile (625.5/km^{2}). There were 6,123 housing units at an average density of 624.8 per square mile (241.2/km^{2}). The racial makeup of the city was 95.5% White, 0.9% African American, 0.2% Native American, 1.5% Asian, 0.5% from other races, and 1.4% from two or more races. Hispanic or Latino of any race were 1.4% of the population.

There were 5,859 households, of which 42.2% had children under the age of 18 living with them, 55.0% were married couples living together, 10.1% had a female householder with no husband present, 4.2% had a male householder with no wife present, and 30.7% were non-families. 23.9% of all households were made up of individuals, and 7.8% had someone living alone who was 65 years of age or older. The average household size was 2.64 and the average family size was 3.16.

The median age in the city was 32.7 years. 30.1% of residents were under the age of 18; 7.1% were between the ages of 18 and 24; 31.9% were from 25 to 44; 20.8% were from 45 to 64; and 10.2% were 65 years of age or older. The gender makeup of the city was 47.8% male and 52.2% female.

=== 2000 census ===
As of the census of 2000, there were 9,641 people, 3,443 households, and 2,513 families residing in the city. The population density was 1,633.9 persons per square mile (630.9 persons/km^{2}). There were 3,531 housing units at an average density of 598.4 per square mile (231.0/km^{2}). The racial makeup of the city was 97.42% White, 0.29% African American, 0.17% Native American, 1.21% Asian, 0.01% Pacific Islander, 0.21% from other races, and 0.69% from two or more races. Hispanic or Latino of any race were 0.87% of the population.

There were 3,443 households, out of which 46.4% had children under the age of 18 living with them, 60.6% were married couples living together, 9.1% had a female householder with no husband present, and 27.0% were non-families. 20.4% of all households were made up of individuals, and 8.0% had someone living alone who was 65 years of age or older. The average household size was 2.75 and the average family size was 3.23.

In the city, the population was spread out, with 32.0% under the age of 18, 8.4% from 18 to 24, 35.5% from 25 to 44, 15.5% from 45 to 64, and 8.7% who were 65 years of age or older. The median age was 31 years. For every 100 females, there were 95.7 males. For every 100 females age 18 and over, there were 91.3 males.

The median income for a household in the city was $52,531, and the median income for a family was $61,056. Males had a median income of $39,834 versus $27,476 for females. The per capita income for the city was $22,667. About 3.0% of families and 4.0% of the population were below the poverty line, including 4.7% of those under age 18 and 8.3% of those age 65 or over.

== Education ==
Most of Sartell in Stearns County is in the Sartell-St. Stephen School District. Portions in that county are in the St. Cloud Area School District. Most of Sartell's Benton County sections are in Sauk Rapids-Rice Public Schools, with the rest in the Sartell-St. Stephen district.

Sartell's St. Cloud school district sections are zoned to Westwood Elementary School, North Middle School, and Apollo High School.

== List of mayors ==
- Charles Sartell, 1907–1923
- C.L. Witherell, 1924–1928, 1932–1936
- Norris Sartell, 1929–1931
- Ripley Sartell Sr, 1937–1943, 1960–1973
- Elmer Thornton, 1944–1947
- Peter Pikus, 1948–1949
- Joseph Gallus, 1950–1955
- Darrel Hurd, 1956–1959
- Tony Zakrajshek, 1974–1978
- Robert C. Bogard, 1979–1990
- Robert Pogatshnik, 1991–2006
- Tim O'Driscoll 2007–2011
- Joe Perske, 2011–2014
- Sarah Nicoll, 2015–2018
- Ryan Fitzthum, 2019–term expires 2026

== Notable people ==
- Al Patton, Minnesota state representative, 1973–1980
- Craig Sauer, linebacker for the Minnesota Vikings
- For All Those Sleeping, metalcore band
- Kurt Sauer, defenseman for the Phoenix Coyotes
- Michael Sauer, drafted by the New York Rangers in July 2005
