= Waite Park, Minnesota =

City in Minnesota, United States

Waite Park
- City
- Motto: "The City With A Smile"
- Location of Waite Park within Stearns County and state of Minnesota
- Coordinates: 45°33′53″N 94°15′10″W
- Country: United States
- State: Minnesota
- County: Stearns
- Incorporated: 1893

Government
  - Mayor: Ken Schmitt

Area
  - Total: 12.71 sq mi (32.92 km^{2})
  - Land: 12.63 sq mi (32.71 km^{2})
  - Water: 0.085 sq mi (0.22 km^{2})
- Elevation: 1,089 ft (332 m)

Population (2020)
  - Total: 8,341
  - Estimate (2021): 8,360
  - Density: 660.5/sq mi (255.02/km^{2})
- Time zone: UTC-6 (CST)
  - Summer (DST): UTC-5 (CDT)
- ZIP codes: 56387, 56388
- Area code: 320
- FIPS code: 27-67612
- GNIS feature ID: 2397165
- Website: ci.waitepark.mn.us

Waite Park is a city in Stearns County, Minnesota, United States. The population was 8,341 at the 2020 census.

== History ==
Waite Park was incorporated in 1893. It was named for Henry Chester Waite, a state legislator. A post office was established at Waite Park in 1897, and remained in operation until 1972.

== Geography ==
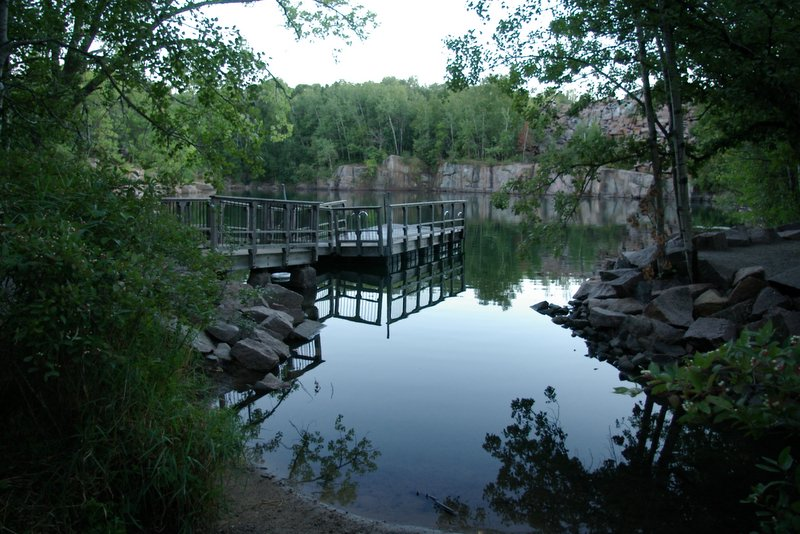
Quarry Park, 2006

According to the United States Census Bureau, the city has an area of 8.94 square miles (23.15 km^{2}); 8.90 square miles (23.05 km^{2}) is land and 0.04 square miles (0.10 km^{2}) is water.

Minnesota State Highway 23 and County 75 are two of Waite Park's main routes.

Minnesota Highway 15 skirts Waite Park's southeastern border. Interstate Highway 94 is immediately southwest of Waite Park.

Waite Park borders the west side of St. Cloud. Stearns County Quarry Park, a former granite quarry, is on Waite Park's south side.

"The Ledge", a city-owned 6,000-seat outdoor amphitheater, opened in Waite Park in 2021. It hosts national acts, smaller concerts, and community events.

== Demographics ==
Historical population
Census	Pop.	Note	%±
1900	317		—
1910	406		28.1%
1920	953		134.7%
1930	1,318		38.3%
1940	1,427		8.3%
1950	1,639		14.9%
1960	2,016		23.0%
1970	2,824		40.1%
1980	3,496		23.8%
1990	5,020		43.6%
2000	6,568		30.8%
2010	6,715		2.2%
2020	8,341		24.2%
2021 (est.)	8,360		0.2%
U.S. Decennial Census; 2020 Census

=== Racial and ethnic composition ===
Waite Park, Minnesota - Demographic Profile (NH = Non-Hispanic)
Race / Ethnicity	Pop 2000	Pop 2010	Pop 2020	% 2000	% 2010	% 2020
White alone (NH)	6,047	5,531	4,809	92.07%	82.37%	57.66%
Black or African American alone (NH)	46	435	2,199	0.70%	6.48%	26.36%
Native American or Alaska Native alone (NH)	32	35	40	0.49%	0.52%	0.48%
Asian alone (NH)	230	240	202	3.50%	3.57%	2.42%
Pacific Islander alone (NH)	3	1	3	0.05%	0.02%	0.04%
Some Other Race alone (NH)	2	10	23	0.03%	0.15%	0.28%
Mixed Race/Multi-Racial (NH)	76	161	251	1.16%	2.40%	3.01%
Hispanic or Latino (any race)	132	302	814	2.01%	4.50%	9.76%
Total	6,568	6,715	8,341	100.00%	100.00%	100.00%

Note: the US Census treats Hispanic/Latino as an ethnic category. This table excludes Latinos from the racial categories and assigns them to a separate category. Hispanics/Latinos can be of any race.

=== 2020 census ===
As of the 2020 census, Waite Park had a population of 8,341. The median age was 34.0 years. 24.1% of residents were under the age of 18 and 17.8% of residents were 65 years of age or older. For every 100 females, there were 98.4 males, and for every 100 females age 18 and over, there were 93.4 males age 18 and over.

92.1% of residents lived in urban areas, while 7.9% lived in rural areas.

There were 3,519 households in Waite Park, of which 27.0% had children under the age of 18 living in them. Of all households, 34.2% were married-couple households, 23.0% were households with a male householder and no spouse or partner present, and 33.5% were households with a female householder and no spouse or partner present. About 37.1% of all households were made up of individuals, and 15.7% had someone living alone who was 65 years of age or older.

There were 3,700 housing units, of which 4.9% were vacant. The homeowner vacancy rate was 0.7% and the rental vacancy rate was 5.9%.

=== 2010 census ===
As of the census of 2010, there were 6,715 people, 3,127 households, and 1,538 families living in the city. The population density was 754.5 inhabitants per square mile (291.3/km^{2}). There were 3,424 housing units at an average density of 384.7 per square mile (148.5/km^{2}). The racial makeup of the city was 83.6% White, 6.6% African American, 0.7% Native American, 3.6% Asian, 2.7% from other races, and 2.9% from two or more races. Hispanic or Latino of any race were 4.5% of the population.

There were 3,127 households, of which 22.7% had children under the age of 18 living with them, 32.9% were married couples living together, 10.9% had a female householder with no husband present, 5.4% had a male householder with no wife present, and 50.8% were non-families. 38.0% of all households were made up of individuals, and 14.6% had someone living alone who was 65 years of age or older. The average household size was 2.12 and the average family size was 2.83.

The median age in the city was 32.6 years. 19.8% of residents were under the age of 18; 16.3% were between the ages of 18 and 24; 26.6% were from 25 to 44; 20.1% were from 45 to 64; and 17.4% were 65 years of age or older. The gender makeup of the city was 47.6% male and 52.4% female.

=== 2000 census ===
As of the census of 2000, there were 6,568 people, 2,967 households, and 1,536 families living in the city. The population density was 841.0 inhabitants per square mile (324.7/km^{2}). There were 3,065 housing units at an average density of 392.5 per square mile (151.5/km^{2}). The racial makeup of the city was 92.74% White, 0.72% African American, 0.56% Native American, 3.50% Asian, 0.05% Pacific Islander, 1.20% from other races, and 1.23% from two or more races. Hispanic or Latino of any race were 2.01% of the population.

There were 2,967 households, out of which 23.8% had children under the age of 18 living with them, 36.5% were married couples living together, 10.1% had a female householder with no husband present, and 48.2% were non-families. 32.1% of all households were made up of individuals, and 10.4% had someone living alone who was 65 years of age or older. The average household size was 2.19 and the average family size was 2.80.

In the city, the population was spread out, with 19.6% under the age of 18, 21.2% from 18 to 24, 30.1% from 25 to 44, 16.0% from 45 to 64, and 13.1% who were 65 years of age or older. The median age was 29 years. For every 100 females, there were 94.9 males. For every 100 females age 18 and over, there were 93.0 males.

The median income for a household in the city was $33,803, and the median income for a family was $43,415. Males had a median income of $27,066 versus $21,481 for females. The per capita income for the city was $17,796. About 7.9% of families and 12.1% of the population were below the poverty line, including 20.8% of those under age 18 and 4.7% of those age 65 or over.

== Government ==
In the 2020 presidential election, Joe Biden won a 3% majority of Waite Park votes. In 2016, Donald Trump won by a 13% margin.

== Education ==
Waite Park is in the St. Cloud Area School District.

Most residents are zoned to Discovery Elementary School, while some blocks north of 3rd Street are zoned to Westwood Elementary School. The zoned middle school is North Middle School, and the zoned high school is Apollo High School.

Waite Park was formerly home to the St. Cloud area campus of Globe University/Minnesota School of Business, a private career college.
