= Church of St. Joseph (St. Joseph, Minnesota) =

Historic church in Minnesota, United States

- Church of St. Joseph–Catholic
- U.S. National Register of Historic Places
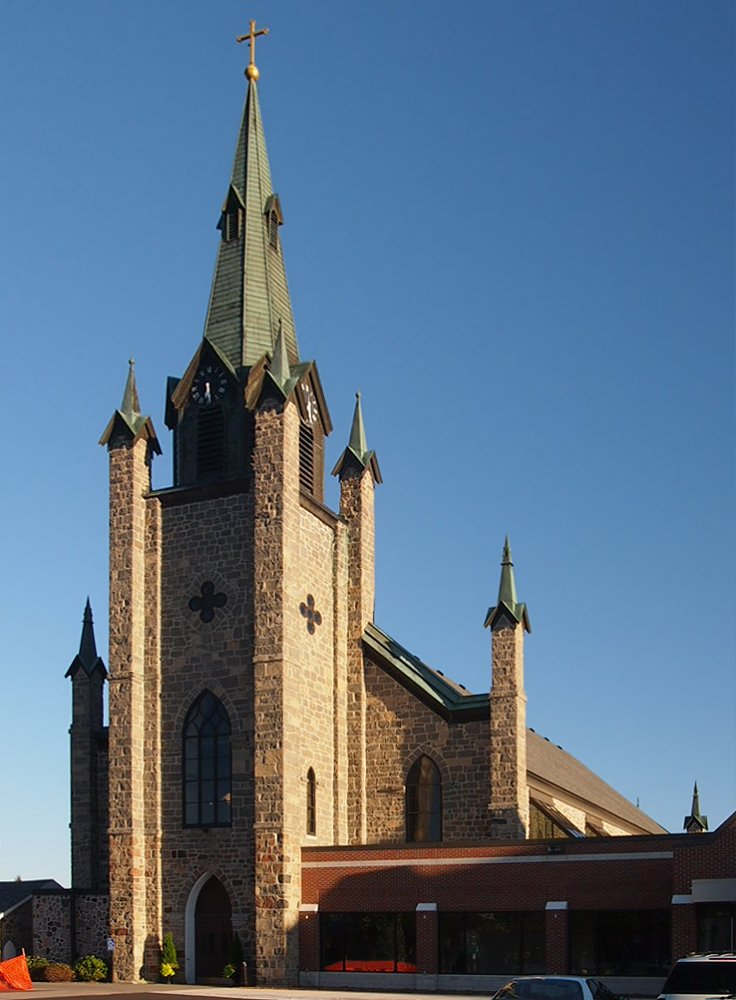
- The Church of St. Joseph viewed from the northwest

- Location within Minnesota Location within the United States
- Location: 12 W. Minnesota Street, St. Joseph, Minnesota
- Coordinates: 45°33′50″N 94°19′6″W
- Built: 1869
- Architectural style: Gothic Revival
- MPS: Ethnic Hamlet Churches–Stearns County Catholic Settlement Churches TR
- NRHP reference No.: 82003057
- Added to NRHP: April 15, 1982

The Church of St. Joseph is a historic Roman Catholic church building in St. Joseph, Minnesota, United States. It is part of the Roman Catholic Diocese of Saint Cloud. It was constructed in a German immigrant community in 1869, though the tower wasn't completed until 1884. A rectory stands east of the church. Both buildings were listed on the National Register of Historic Places in 1982 for their state-level significance in the themes of architecture, exploration/settlement, and religion. The property was nominated for reflecting the settlement of rural Stearns County by Catholic immigrant groups clustered in small, ethnic hamlets dominated by a central church.

== History ==
The first Mass in the community was celebrated by Francis Xavier Pierz on October 22, 1854, when the town was still named Clinton. The first church building was completed a year later, and a small log school building was attached in 1860. The parish decided to build a more spacious building, measuring 66 by 150 feet (20 by 46 m), with the lower half consisting of native fieldstones and the upper half of granite brick from a nearby quarry. Construction began in 1869, and on June 29, 1871, Bishop Thomas Grace consecrated the building. This was the first consecrated church in Minnesota made of permanent materials. The rectory was built in 1874 using similar fieldstone construction. Ten years later the church tower was completed. Four years after that, in 1888, the church and rectory were connected by a stylistically consistent passageway.

== See also ==
- List of Catholic churches in the United States
- National Register of Historic Places listings in Stearns County, Minnesota
