= Little Rock Lake (Benton County, Minnesota) =

- Location within Minnesota Location within the United States
- Location: Benton County, Minnesota, United States
- Coordinates: 45°44′18″N 94°10′02″W
- Type: Reservoir
- Primary inflows: Mississippi River
- Primary outflows: Mississippi River
- Basin countries: United States
- Surface area: 2.27 mi² (5.87 km²)
- Max. depth: 23 ft (7.0 m)
- Surface elevation: 1,015 ft (309 m)

Little Rock Lake is a reservoir in Benton County, Minnesota, United States. The lake was formed in 1911 by the impounding of the Mississippi River by the Sartell Dam 5 miles (8 km) downriver. Little Rock Lake was named from Little Rock Creek.

The lake has two public boat access points. Water clarity in the lake is low (less than 1.5 feet) and there are almost no aquatic plants.
