= Rockville Township, Stearns County, Minnesota =

Rockville Township, Minnesota
- Township
- Location within the state of Minnesota
- Coordinates: 45°27′N 94°19′W
- Country: United States
- State: Minnesota
- County: Stearns

Area
  - Total: 34.5 sq mi (89.3 km^{2})
  - Land: 32.5 sq mi (84.3 km^{2})
  - Water: 1.9 sq mi (5.0 km^{2})
- Elevation: 1,099 ft (335 m)

Population (2000)
  - Total: 1,254
  - Density: 39/sq mi (14.9/km^{2})
- Time zone: UTC-6 (Central (CST))
  - Summer (DST): UTC-5 (CDT)
- ZIP code: 56369
- Area code: 320
- FIPS code: 27-55096
- GNIS feature ID: 0665440

Rockville Township was a township in Stearns County, Minnesota, United States. The population was 1,254 at the 2000 census. On 1 June 2002, Rockville Township and the city of Pleasant Lake were merged into the city of Rockville.

== Geography ==
According to the United States Census Bureau, the township had a total area of 34.5 square miles (89.3 km^{2}). 32.5 square miles (84.3 km^{2}) of it was land and 1.9 square miles (5.0 km^{2}) of it (5.60%) was water.

Rockville Township is located in Township 123 North of the Arkansas Base Line and Range 29 West of the 5th Principal Meridian.

== Demographics ==
As of the census of 2000, there were 1,254 people, 399 households, and 339 families residing in the township. The population density was 38.5 inhabitants per square mile (14.9/km^{2}). There were 441 housing units at an average density of 13.6 per square mile (5.3/km^{2}). The racial makeup of the township was 99.52% White, 0.08% Native American, 0.08% Asian, 0.08% from other races, and 0.24% from two or more races. Hispanic or Latino of any race were 0.16% of the population.

There were 399 households, out of which 45.1% had children under the age of 18 living with them, 81.7% were married couples living together, 1.8% had a female householder with no husband present, and 15.0% were non-families. 12.0% of all households were made up of individuals, and 3.0% had someone living alone who was 65 years of age or older. The average household size was 3.14 and the average family size was 3.45.

In the township the population was spread out, with 32.5% under the age of 18, 5.7% from 18 to 24, 30.5% from 25 to 44, 22.4% from 45 to 64, and 8.9% who were 65 years of age or older. The median age was 36 years. For every 100 females, there were 108.3 males. For every 100 females age 18 and over, there were 102.6 males.

The median income for a household in the township was $61,250, and the median income for a family was $65,625. Males had a median income of $36,250 versus $25,063 for females. The per capita income for the township was $20,703. About 1.5% of families and 2.0% of the population were below the poverty line, including 0.9% of those under age 18 and 2.8% of those age 65 or over.
