= Sartell Dam =

Dam in Minnesota, U.S.

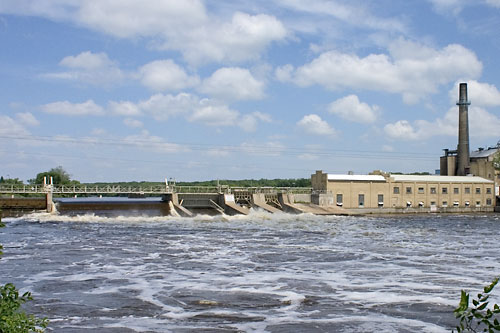
- Sartell Dam
- Interactive map of Sartell Dam
- Location: Sartell, Minnesota, USA
- Coordinates: 45°37′15″N 94°12′13″W
- Construction began: 1907
- Opening date: 1911
- Operator: Verso Paper

Dam and spillways
- Impounds: Mississippi River
- Height: 20 ft

Reservoir
- Creates: Little Rock Lake

The Sartell Dam is a dam across the Mississippi River in Sartell, Minnesota in the United States. The dam was used to generate hydroelectric power for the adjoining Sartell Paper Mill before it burned down in 2012. The dam is referred to as the Champion Dam in official documentation.

Construction of the structure was begun by the Watab Pulp and Paper Company in 1907 and finished in 1911. Seven workers died during construction, most from drowning as a result of washouts on the site's cofferdam. A cave-in on the dam's west end also killed the son of the project's foreman.

The dam was constructed of wooden planks, local granite, and field stones as well as 25,000 barrels concrete.

Between 1960 and 1964, the dam was rebuilt by the St. Regis Corporation which had purchased the adjoining paper mill in 1946. The mill and dam are currently owned by Verso Paper.

Construction of the dam resulted in the formation of Little Rock Lake approximately five miles (8 km) upriver. The dam itself is 20 feet tall.

Next dam upstream	Mississippi River	Next dam downstream
Blanchard Dam	Sartell Dam	St. Cloud Dam
