= Jim Fahnhorst =

American football player (1958–2025)

No. 55
- Position: Linebacker

Personal information
- Born: November 8, 1958; St. Cloud, Minnesota, U.S.
- Died: September 17, 2025 (aged 66)
- Listed height: 6 ft 4 in (1.93 m)
- Listed weight: 230 lb (104 kg)

Career information
- High school: St. Cloud Technical
- College: Minnesota
- NFL draft: 1982: 4th round, 92nd overall pick

Career history
- Minnesota Vikings (1982)*; Chicago Blitz (1983); Arizona Wranglers (1984); San Francisco 49ers (1984–1990)
- * Offseason or practice squad member only

Awards and highlights
- 3× Super Bowl champion (XIX, XXIII, XXIV); First-team All-Big Ten (1981)

Career NFL statistics
- Sacks: 1
- Interceptions: 7
- Stats at Pro Football Reference

James John Fahnhorst (November 8, 1958 – September 17, 2025) was an American professional football player who was a linebacker for the San Francisco 49ers of the National Football League (NFL) from 1984 through 1990. He was a member of three Super Bowl champions with the 49ers and was a starter in Super Bowl XIX, XXIII, and XXIV. Fahnhorst grew up in St. Cloud, Minnesota and graduated from St. Cloud Tech High School. He played college football for the Minnesota Golden Gophers, earning first-team All-Big Ten honors from AP and UPI in 1981. He is the younger brother of the late former 49ers' tackle Keith Fahnhorst. Graduating with a BA in psychology, and a minor in Criminology.

Fahnhorst also played two years in the United States Football League (USFL) for coaching legend George Allen in the spring/summer of 1983 and 1984 for the Chicago Blitz and Arizona Wranglers. He was a financial advisor and coached college football at Division III Macalester College and at Wayzata and Maple Grove High Schools in the Minneapolis area.

Fahnhorst died on September 17, 2025, at the age of 66.
