= St. Joseph, Minnesota =

City in Minnesota, United States

St. Joseph
- City
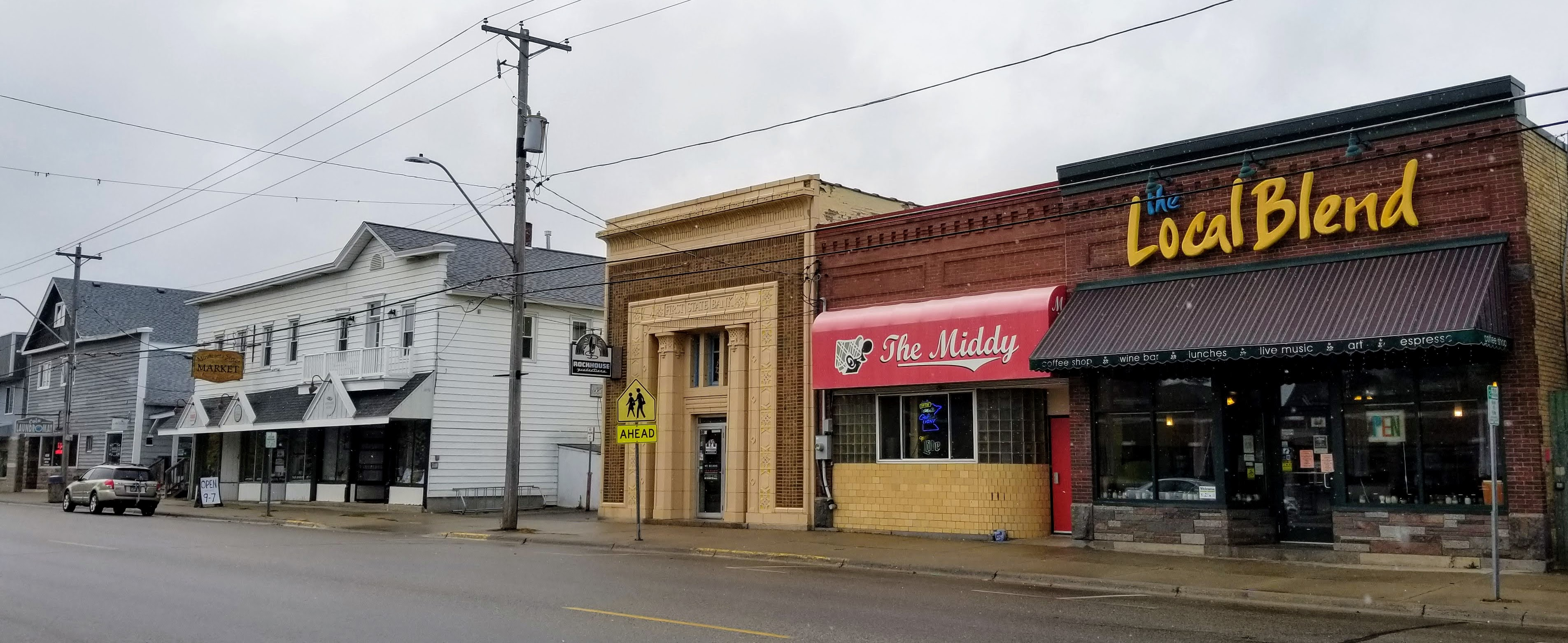
- Businesses lining West Minnesota Street
- Motto: "Tomorrow With Tradition"
- Location of St. Joseph within Stearns County, Minnesota
- Coordinates: 45°33′56″N 94°18′13″W
- Country: United States
- State: Minnesota
- County: Stearns
- Founded: 1855
- Incorporated: January 18, 1890

Government
  - Mayor: Adam Scepaniak
  - Council: Kelly Beniek; Kevin Kluesner; Adam Schnettler

Area
  - Total: 9.31 sq mi (24.11 km^{2})
  - Land: 9.29 sq mi (24.07 km^{2})
  - Water: 0.015 sq mi (0.04 km^{2})
- Elevation: 1,093 ft (333 m)

Population (2020)
  - Total: 7,029
  - Estimate (2021): 6,932
  - Density: 756.5/sq mi (292.08/km^{2})
- Time zone: UTC-6 (CST)
  - Summer (DST): UTC-5 (CDT)
- ZIP codes: 56374
- Area code: 320
- FIPS code: 27-57130
- GNIS feature ID: 2396497
- Website: cityofstjoseph.com

St. Joseph or Saint Joseph is a city in Stearns County, Minnesota, United States. The population was 7,029 at the 2020 census. It is home to the College of Saint Benedict and Saint John's University.

St. Joseph is part of the St. Cloud metropolitan area. The unincorporated Florida community of St. Joseph, Florida, is named after the Minnesota city.

== History ==
Originally home to the native Dakota people until the signing of the Treaty of Traverse des Sioux in 1851, St. Joseph was laid out in 1855.

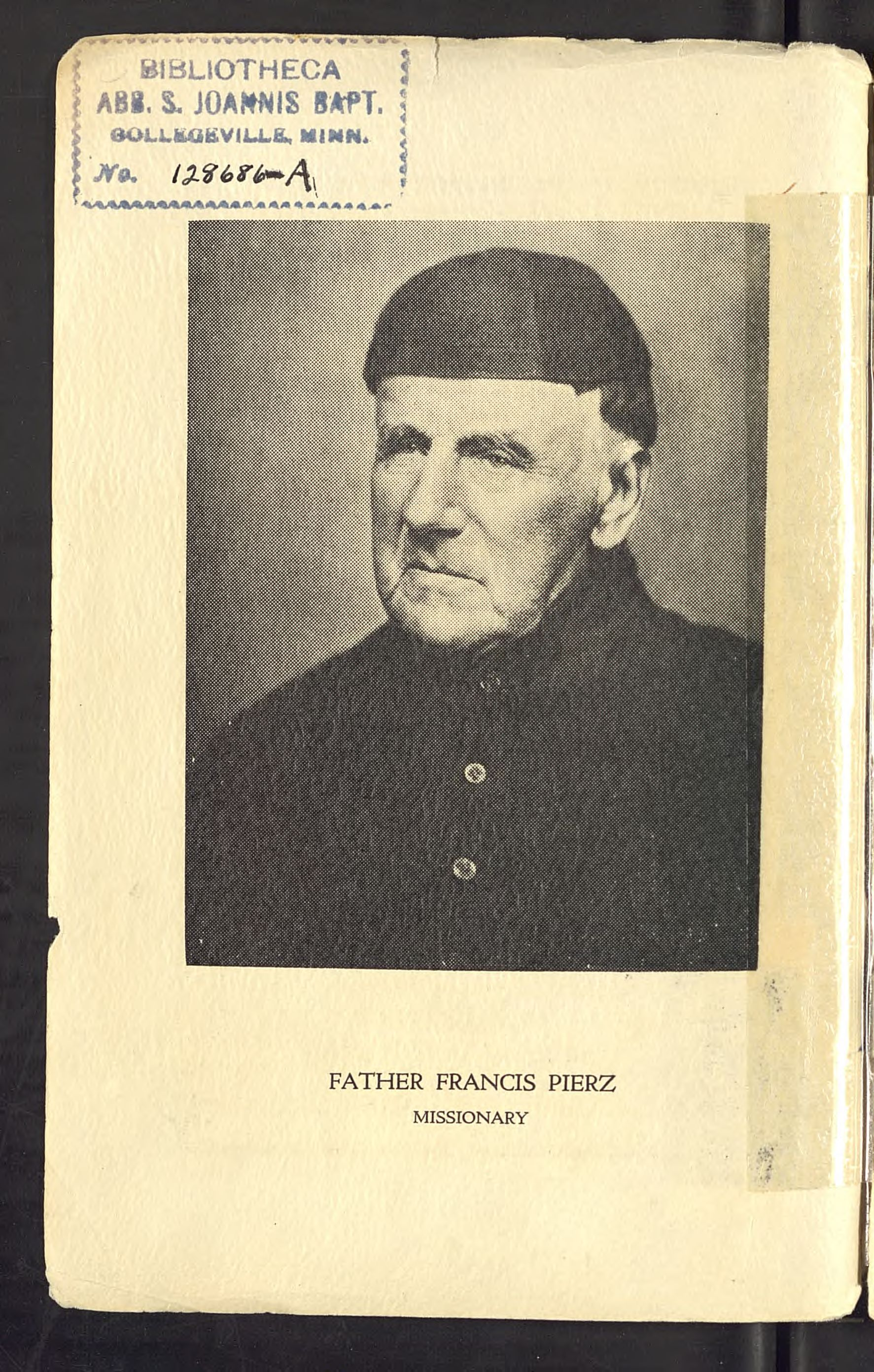
Father Francis Pierz, Missionary, from Father Francis Pierz, Missionary.

Writing in 1997, Jewish-American historian of America's religious architecture Marilyn J. Chiat described early settlement in the region, "Father Francis X. Pierz, a missionary to [Native Americans] in central Minnesota, published a series of articles in 1851 in German Catholic newspapers advocating Catholic settlement in central Minnesota. Large numbers of immigrants, mainly German, but also Slovenian and Polish, responded. Over 20 parishes where formed in what is now Stearns County, each centered on a church-oriented hamlet. As the farmers prospered, the small frame churches were replaced by more substantial buildings of brick or stone... Stearns County retains in its German character and is still home to one of the largest rural Catholic populations in Anglo-America."

St. Joseph was named by early German and Slovenian settlers after the patron saint of their newly erected log chapel.

Pioneer settlement in St. Joseph is very important to the history of the Slovenian diaspora. Pierz had previously brought with him from Slovenia his 12-year-old nephew Joseph Notsch Jr., the son of his sister, Apollonia Notsch. Notsch accompanied Pierz on trips, serving Mass and cooking. In 1855, Notsch's parents and siblings became the first Slovenian family to emigrate to the New World, and carried with them an altarpiece for Pierz painted by Matevž Langus. The Notsch family was accused of foolishness by Janez Bleiweis in the Ljubliana newspaper Novice. Apollonia Notsch later wrote a famous letter from her family's homestead in St. Joseph, describing the family's passage on the immigrant ship, her impressions of frontier life in the Minnesota Territory, and her joy at having emigrated to America. The letter was published in Novice and convinced many other Slovenes to follow the Notsch family's lead.

According to Bruno Riss, a Benedictine missionary priest from Augsburg and founding father of St John's Abbey, the May 1856 arrival of the first Benedictine priests in the area at the invitation of Bishop Joseph Crétin was opposed by some local Catholic pioneers. This was because many local settlers had been tenant farmers in the German States and had emigrated to America seeking to own the farmland on which they worked. Recalling that religious orders in Germany had often been their landlords and fearing that the Benedictine order might turn them back into tenant farmers, the parishioners wrote to the Bishop "begging him not to impose monks on them". The Bishop was outraged and placed St. Joseph under an interdict until the parishioners apologized in August 1856. The Benedictines won the trust of local settlers by regularly helping them to both choose and defend their new homesteads.

After the lifting of the interdict against St. Joseph, the first Rocky Mountain locust plague to strike Central Minnesota began on the Feast of the Assumption of 15 August 1856, during the preaching of a mission by Father Francis Xavier Weninger inside the newly erected log chapel. The locusts darkened the sky and pounded upon the rooftop of the chapel so loudly that they were mistaken for a hailstorm. Only after the mission did the real reason for the "storm" become apparent, and the clouds of "hoppers" swiftly devoured both the crops and much of the seed grain, leaving the newly arrived settlers destitute.

St. Benedict's Academy at Saint Joseph was a Native American residential school operated by the College of Saint Benedict, opening in 1884. The school held Native American women and taught them traditional school subjects, like spelling, reading, and math, as well as sewing, ornamental needlework, baking, cooking, laundry, dairy-work, and gardening.

St. Joseph was incorporated in 1890 and contains three properties listed on the National Register of Historic Places: the 1869 stone Church of St. Joseph, the 1918 First State Bank building, and a district of historic buildings at Saint Benedict's Monastery and College built between 1882 and the 1920s.

== Geography ==
According to the United States Census Bureau, the city has an area of 3.89 square miles (10.08 km^{2}), all land.

Stearns County Road 75 serves as a main route in the community. Other routes include County Roads 2, 3, 121, 133, and 134. Interstate 94/US Highway 52 is nearby.

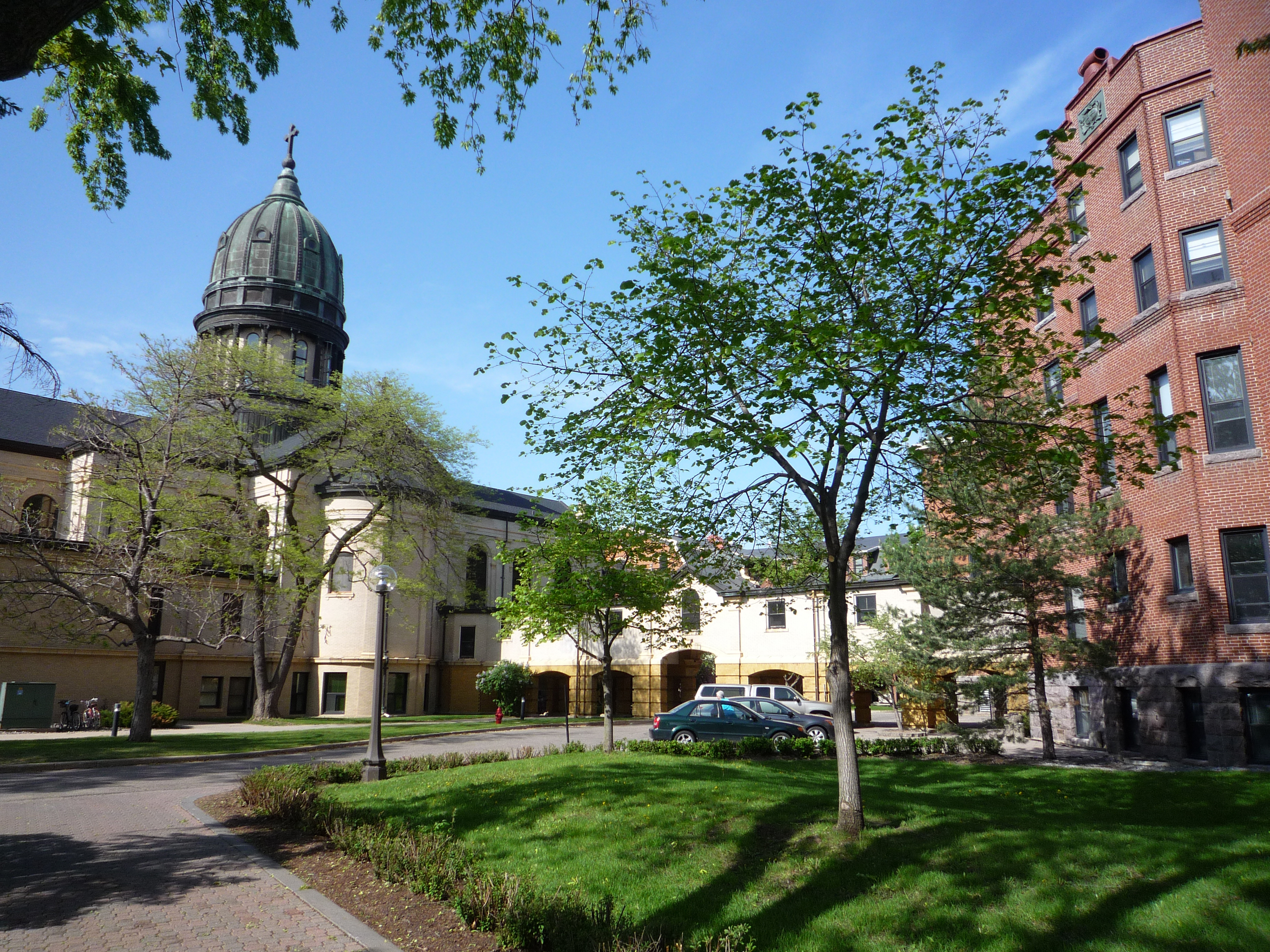
The College of Saint Benedict

Some of the city's major landmarks include St. Joseph Catholic Church, St. Benedict's Monastery, and the College of St. Benedict. The College of Saint Benedict is an all-women's Catholic college, and the complex is noted in the downtown area for the high spire of St. Joseph's Church and the rotunda and dome of the Monastery and College Sacred Heart Chapel. The architecture is different from other buildings and the major structures are visible from miles away.

== Demographics ==
Historical population
| Census | Pop. | Note | %± |
|---|---|---|---|
| 1880 | 292 | | — |
| 1890 | 503 | | 72.3% |
| 1900 | 549 | | 9.1% |
| 1910 | 706 | | 28.6% |
| 1920 | 717 | | 1.6% |
| 1930 | 1,009 | | 40.7% |
| 1940 | 1,055 | | 4.6% |
| 1950 | 1,246 | | 18.1% |
| 1960 | 1,487 | | 19.3% |
| 1970 | 1,786 | | 20.1% |
| 1980 | 2,994 | | 67.6% |
| 1990 | 3,294 | | 10.0% |
| 2000 | 4,681 | | 42.1% |
| 2010 | 6,534 | | 39.6% |
| 2020 | 7,029 | | 7.6% |
| 2021 (est.) | 6,932 | | −1.4% |
U.S. Decennial Census; 2020 Census

=== Racial and ethnic composition ===
St. Joseph, Minnesota - Demographic Profile (NH = Non-Hispanic)
| Race / Ethnicity | Pop 2000 | Pop 2010 | Pop 2020 | % 2000 | % 2010 | % 2020 |
|---|---|---|---|---|---|---|
| White alone (NH) | 4,681 | 6,067 | 7,029 | 95.94% | 92.85% | 83.94% |
| Black or African American alone (NH) | 44 | 72 | 464 | 0.94% | 1.11% | 6.60% |
| Native American or Alaska Native alone (NH) | 8 | 12 | 22 | 0.17% | 0.19% | 0.31% |
| Asian alone (NH) | 46 | 157 | 130 | 0.98% | 2.40% | 1.85% |
| Pacific Islander alone (NH) | 3 | 9 | 0 | 0.06% | 0.14% | 0.00% |
| Some Other Race alone (NH) | 2 | 9 | 8 | 0.04% | 0.14% | 0.11% |
| Mixed Race/Multi-Racial (NH) | 30 | 95 | 173 | 0.64% | 1.45% | 2.46% |
| Hispanic or Latino (any race) | 57 | 122 | 332 | 1.22% | 1.76% | 4.72% |
| Total | 4,681 | 6,534 | 7,029 | 100.00% | 100.00% | 100.00% |

Note: the US Census treats Hispanic/Latino as an ethnic category. This table excludes Latinos from the racial categories and assigns them to a separate category. Hispanics/Latinos can be of any race.

=== 2020 census ===
As of the 2020 census, St. Joseph had a population of 7,029. The median age was 27.1 years. 20.7% of residents were under the age of 18, and 12.6% were 65 years of age or older. For every 100 females, there were 60.8 males, and for every 100 females age 18 and over there were 52.2 males age 18 and over.

95.7% of residents lived in urban areas, while 4.3% lived in rural areas.

There were 2,183 households in St. Joseph, of which 31.0% had children under the age of 18 living in them. Of all households, 48.1% were married-couple households, 17.0% were households with a male householder and no spouse or partner present, and 27.6% were households with a female householder and no spouse or partner present. About 29.9% of all households were made up of individuals, and 13.1% had someone living alone who was 65 years of age or older.

There were 2,313 housing units, of which 5.6% were vacant. The homeowner vacancy rate was 1.2%, and the rental vacancy rate was 13.2%.

=== 2010 census ===
As of the census of 2010, there were 6,534 people, 1,845 households, and 1,184 families living in the city. The population density was 1,679.7 inhabitants per square mile (648.5/km^{2}). There were 1,912 housing units at an average density of 491.5 per square mile (189.8/km^{2}). The racial makeup of the city was 93.7% White, 1.1% African American, 0.2% Native American, 2.4% Asian, 0.9% from other races, and 1.7% from two or more races. Hispanic or Latino of any race were 1.9% of the population.

There were 1,845 households, of which 33.3% had children under the age of 18 living with them, 50.7% were married couples living together, 9.5% had a female householder with no husband present, 4.0% had a male householder with no wife present, and 35.8% were non-families. 21.2% of all households were made up of individuals, and 5.3% had someone living alone who was 65 years of age or older. The average household size was 2.61 and the average family size was 2.96.

The median age in the city was 22.7 years. 17.1% of residents were under the age of 18; 37.7% were between the ages of 18 and 24; 22.3% were from 25 to 44; 15.1% were from 45 to 64; and 7.9% were 65 years of age or older. The gender makeup of the city was 37.2% male and 62.8% female.

=== 2000 census ===
As of the census of 2000, there were 4,681 people, 1,120 households, and 712 families living in the city. The population density was 2,517.4 inhabitants per square mile (972.0/km^{2}). There were 1,147 housing units at an average density of 616.8 per square mile (238.1/km^{2}). The racial makeup of the city was 96.69% White, 1.00% African American, 0.21% Native American, 0.98% Asian, 0.06% Pacific Islander, 0.38% from other races, and 0.66% from two or more races. Hispanics or Latinos of any race were 1.22% of the population.

There were 1,120 households, out of which 35.5% had children under the age of 18 living with them, 48.2% were married couples living together, 10.9% had a female householder with no husband present, and 36.4% were non-families. 21.3% of all households were made up of individuals, and 6.1% had someone living alone who was 65 years of age or older. The average household size was 2.74 and the average family size was 3.06.

The age distribution is 16.7% under the age of 18, 44.4% from 18 to 24, 19.8% from 25 to 44, 10.4% from 45 to 64, and 8.6% who were 65 years of age or older. The median age was 22 years. For every 100 females, there were 46.4 males. For every 100 females age 18 and over, there were 39.1 males.

The median income for a household in the city was $38,938, and the median income for a family was $44,737. Males had a median income of $33,344 versus $22,007 for females. The per capita income for the city was $12,011. About 5.4% of families and 20.8% of the population were below the poverty line, including 7.7% of those under age 18 and 35.2% of those age 65 or over.

== Education ==
=== Primary and secondary education ===
St. Joseph is served by the St. Cloud Area School District. Most of St. Joseph is zoned to Kennedy Community School (PK-8). but some portions in the east are zoned to Westwood Elementary School and North Middle School. The zoned high school is Apollo High School.

Kennedy Community School is a PreK-8 grade school, serving families from St. Joseph. The school opened in 2008 after a referendum passed to build a larger school about a mile outside of town. The former school, Kennedy Elementary, was established in 1968.

Saint Joseph Catholic School is a parochial school in St. Joseph that has been associated with the local parish of the same name since the 1850s. At that time there was no money to pay teachers, so parents did work for a local farmer, who in turn, taught the children. The school got its own building in the 1920s. For many years, it served as the only school in town and as the community center. In the 1970s, the school collaborated with the College of St. Benedict to become a lab school. In the 2000s, it joined with St. Cloud-area parochial schools to become part of All Saints Academy.

=== Higher education ===
The College of Saint Benedict (CSB) is a four-year, private liberal arts college and the nation's only Benedictine college for women. It opened in 1913, with six students enrolled, and grew out of St. Benedict's Academy, which was founded by Saint Benedict's Monastery in 1889. The Benedictine community incorporated CSB in 1961. The college is also connected to Saint John's University (SJU), which is a male-only university in Collegeville Township, Minnesota.

== Events ==
In May of each year since 2008, hundreds of runners line up in Holdingford and run the Lake Wobegon Trail Marathon route to the finish line in St. Joseph.

The College of St. Benedict is home to the Claire Lynch Gym, where the NCAA DIII Bennies complete in volleyball and basketball against regional MIAC teams. The outdoor athletic complex is the Bennies' home for hosting MIAC soccer and softball games.

Since 2006, the Church of St. Joseph has hosted the annual Joetown Rocks music concert, which in recent years has seen annual turnouts of several thousand people. The outdoor concert traditionally occurs in conjunction with Independence Day, and has featured headlining acts such as the Killer Vees, stars from the original Broadway cast of Jersey Boys, and the Fabulous Armadillos.

== Notable people ==
- Richard Carlbom, chair of the Minnesota Democratic-Farmer-Labor Party since 2025, served as mayor of St. Joseph from 2005 to 2007.
- Steve Dehler (born 1950), was a Minnesota legislator and mayor of St. Joseph.
- Joyce Sutphen (born 1949) was named in 2011 as the State's Poet Laureate by Minnesota Governor Mark Dayton.
- Jacob Wetterling (1978 - 1989) was kidnapped and from his hometown and murdered at the age of 11. It was announced on September 3, 2016 that Jacob's remains had been found and positively identified.
- Patty Wetterling (born November 2, 1949) is retired civil servants and an advocate for children's safety, particularly focused on protecting children from abduction and abuse. Her advocacy began after her son, Jacob Wetterling, was abducted and murdered on October 22, 1989.
- The Servant of God Sister Annella Zervas, O.S.B. (1900–1926), is the closest that Minnesota possesses to a Canonized Saint. Her grave in the cemetery of Saint Benedict's Monastery continues to receive pilgrims.

== See also ==
- Saint Joseph
