= Technical Senior High School =

Technical High School

Location
- 4200 S. 33rd St; St. Cloud, Minnesota 56301; United States; 45°30′49″N 94°12′37″W

Information
- Type: Public
- Motto: A Tradition of Excellence since 1917
- Established: 1917
- School district: ISD 742
- Principal: Molly Kensy
- Staff: 87.69 (on an FTE basis)
- Grades: 9–12
- Enrollment: 1,538 (2023-2024)
- Student to teacher ratio: 17.54
- Colors: Orange and black
- Athletics conference: Central Lakes
- Mascot: Tiger
- Website: https://tech.isd742.org/

Technical High School is a public high school in Saint Cloud, Minnesota, United States. It is one of St. Cloud Area School District's two major public high schools; the other is Apollo. The school's first building was built in 1917 at 233 12th Avenue South. Another building was added in the 1970s to accommodate the student population. A new facility was completed in 2019.

In addition to sections of St. Cloud, the high school's attendance boundary includes Clearwater, most of Clear Lake, most of St. Augusta, and parts of Rockville.

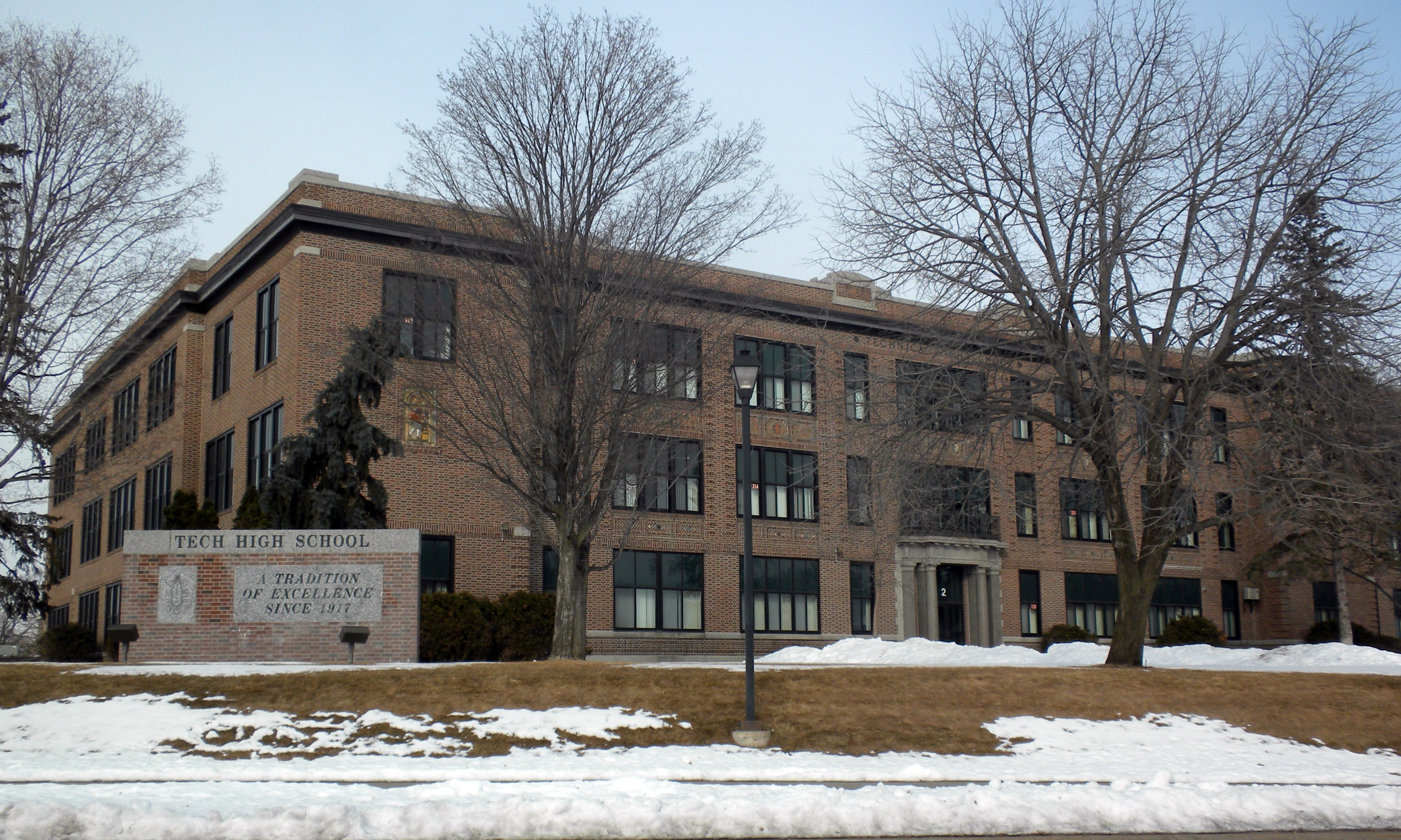
Former St. Cloud Tech High School

== Academics ==
St. Cloud Tech offers Advanced Placement courses. Students have a wide variety of choices for Advanced Placement, including math, science, language, and social sciences, with a total of 19 AP courses. Students at both Apollo and Technical High Schools have performed very well on AP Exams, with approximately 70% of students receiving college credit for their scores. Other options for additional rigor are available as well, including Senior to Sophomore, the state's Post Secondary Enrollment Options (PSEO), articulated college credit, Discovery Academy, SciGals, and Upward Bound.

In the 1980s and 1990s, Tech served as both a senior and junior high school, with grades 7–12 in attendance. The class of 1994 was the last to attend Tech from grade 7 through grade 12.

== Sports ==
St. Cloud Tech has a number of boys' and girls' sports programs, including football, baseball, basketball, volleyball, gymnastics, golf, softball, hockey, alpine skiing, lacrosse, Nordic skiing, wrestling, soccer, tennis, swimming, cross-country running, track and field and adaptive sports. Tech is in the Central Lakes Conference, competing against other high schools in and around central Minnesota, including its crosstown rival Apollo. Tech's mascot is the Tiger, with its athletic teams sporting the tiger's colors of black and orange. Tech's football team formerly played across the street from the school at Clark Field, which opposing schools' players nicknamed "The Pit" or "The Hole".

In September 2012, it was announced that Clark Field would temporarily but indefinitely close because of poor conditions, including mold and lead. Varsity events that would have been held there were held at St. Cloud State University. The field is still used for smaller events. Tech's new sports complex is on the same grounds as the new high school. Athletic activities occur on site on the new complex of fields for baseball, football, soccer, and tennis.

== Music ==
Tech High School has a music program, with orchestra, band, and choir as the three major components. The orchestra program is broken into three groups, by their ability: Concert Orchestra, Symphony Orchestra, and Chamber Orchestra. The Chamber Orchestra is a smaller elite group of musicians who have volunteered to practice before school one day a week. It performs at special events in the community, as well as at Tech. The Symphony Orchestra is the primary orchestral group, and the Concert group comprises mostly freshman and sophomore students.

The Tech Band and Orchestra have a tradition of going on tour every two years to a major U.S. city. Some recent destinations have been Orlando in 2014, New Orleans in 2012, and New York City in 2010.

== Activities ==
A variety of extracurricular activities are offered at St. Cloud Tech, including Speech, TARGET, Math Team, Students Against Destructive Decisions (SADD), Knowledge Bowl, Music Listening Contest, the Economics Challenge, VEX Robotics, and National Honor Society. These programs have helped students develop leadership skills. At the 2013 Econ Challenge, Tech senior Tyler Benning was named the #1 Econ student in the state. Led by head coach Karmin Schraw, the speech team placed 8th at the 2013 National Forensics League national tournament in Alabama. Phillip Hoelscher, a 2013 graduate, placed 8th in the Drama category, beating out hundreds of kids from around the nation. The previous year he placed 2nd in Drama at the Harvard Invitational while his teammate, Maria Null, took 5th place in Drama that same year. The speech team has won the Central Lakes Conference title 21 years in a row.

Tech's VEX Robotics team has also seen notable success, reaching the state competition every year since its founding. Tech team 98377G also reached the VEX World Championship in 2022 and 2023, and set the state records for awards won in a season (24), matches won in a season (113), and longest winning streak (55 matches).

== New building ==
After a referendum on November 8, 2016, it was announced that the school would move to a new building and be renamed Tech High School.

The 100-year-old school building celebrated its last school year in June 2019. Athletic facilities at the new school include a pool, three court main gyms and one court auxiliary gym, a multipurpose activities room, fitness room, multipurpose outdoor stadium, four multipurpose grass fields, three softball fields, two baseball fields, and an eight-court outdoor tennis facility. New Tech features a 900-seat auditorium; choir, orchestra, and band ensemble rooms; small group practice rooms; and 2D and 3D art studios.

== Notable alumni ==
- Jim Fahnhorst, National Football League player
- Brevyn Spann-Ford, NFL player
