= Verso Paper Sartell Mill =

Former paper mill in Sartell, Minnesota, United States

Coordinates: 45.6200°N 94.2012°W

The Sartell Paper Mill, officially the Verso Paper Sartell Mill, was a paper mill located in the city of Sartell in the U.S. state of Minnesota, operating from 1905 until a disastrous explosion in 2012.

== History ==
=== Watab Pulp and Paper ===
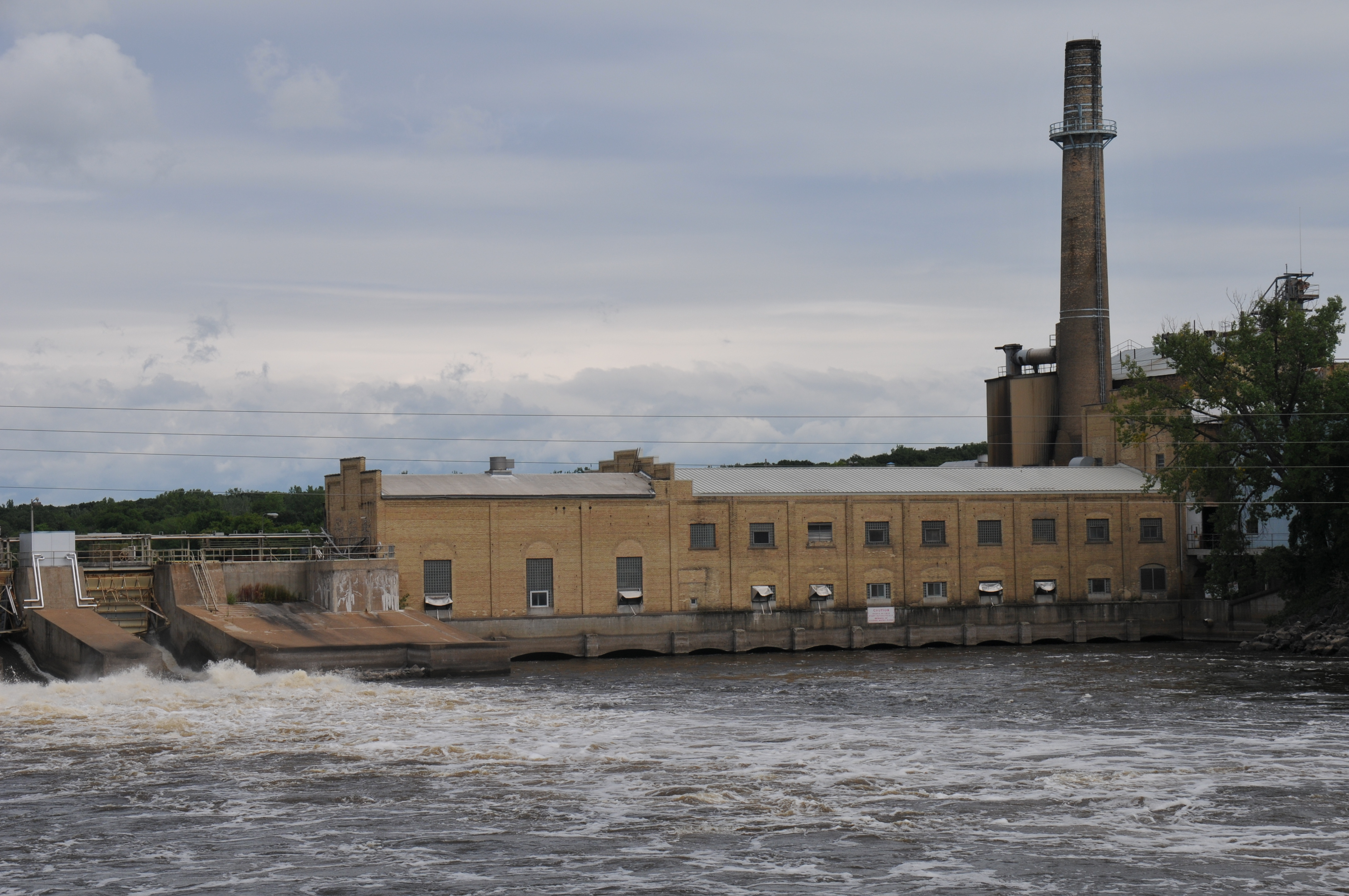
An older section of the mill in 2013

The original company, Watab Pulp and Paper, was conceived by a group of lumbermen from Wisconsin and Michigan and was formed on May 10, 1905 with a capitalization of $200,000. The stock shares were $100 each.

It was the intent to build the mill at Sauk Rapids at the location of the Sauk Rapids Bridge, but the owners of the power rights were asking what was felt to be an exorbitant price. Watab Pulp and Paper went further upstream, to Sartell, and for a sum of $1.00 made an agreement with the owners of the existing saw mill to move it from the west side of the Mississippi River to a point just inside the village limits.

The plant started operations with No. 1 paper machine in September, 1905. No. 2 paper machine was built in 1910. The company then produced newsprint until 1930, when the conversion to groundwood book and magazine papers began.

Many changes have taken place since the days when log drives down the Mississippi River were common and the paper mill was experimenting using corn stalks as a raw material.

During the 1930s, recycled magazines were a prime source of wood pulp. The waste magazines were brought by rail from Chicago in bales weighing up to 2,000 pounds. In the “sorting room,” paper clips and staples were removed. The waste was then sent to the cookers for deinking and bleaching. The conversion plant operated through the 1930s until the end of World War II.

The war years brought other changes to the Sartell mill:

- Women were employed to a greater extent. They sorted magazines and operated the lap machines which enabled the storage of groundwood pulp.
- Sartell manufactured large amounts of paper for the Lend-Lease program after World War II. Some of this paper was sent to Russia.
- During the war, target paper was made for use by the military.
- During this period, the mill also started manufacturing telephone directory, both white and yellow pages.

At the end of the war, the mill closed the finishing operation where paper was sheeted and cut to size. Since that time, all paper manufactured at Sartell has been shipped in roll form.

=== St. Regis ===
The mill as seen from the air under St. Regis ownership in 1946.

St. Regis bought Watab Pulp and Paper and its properties in 1946. The transition was smooth with minor changes in mill management.

Plant operations changed immensely. Until 1948, 100-inch wood was handled by hand. Large unloading crews handled the wood from railroad cars to a system of conveyors for building huge storage piles on the river’s edge.

Over the years, many changes had taken place with the mill’s machinery:

- Wooden gears on the paper machine had been changed to metal and plastic
- Fourdrinier bronze wires were changed to polyester fabrics
- Natural sandstone grinder stones became synthetic carborundum

Another operation that is no longer performed relates to storing groundwood. In 1934, a large concrete pad was constructed for storing “lapped groundwood pulp. Because of the water-driven groundwood mill, at time of high water availability, excess groundwood was manufactured for use when the water flow was low. Separation of frozen laps was difficult during cold Minnesota winters. When separation was not possible with crowbars, dynamite was used. The lapped groundwood pulp was then brought into the mill and placed into beaters for repulping and use.

In 1957, No. 1 paper machine had a major rebuild. The same was done the following year on No. 2 paper machine. Both machines were sped up with the addition of new steam turbine drives and new headboxes.

The mill had one of the earliest supercalenders in the industry. In 1960, No. 1 and No. 2 supercalenders were installed.

Since the 1960s, uncoated supercalendered grades of paper have been manufactured. In the past twenty years, basis weight of these papers has been reduced from a 43-pound sheet that was used in Family Circle magazine to, in some instances, as low as 26 pound.

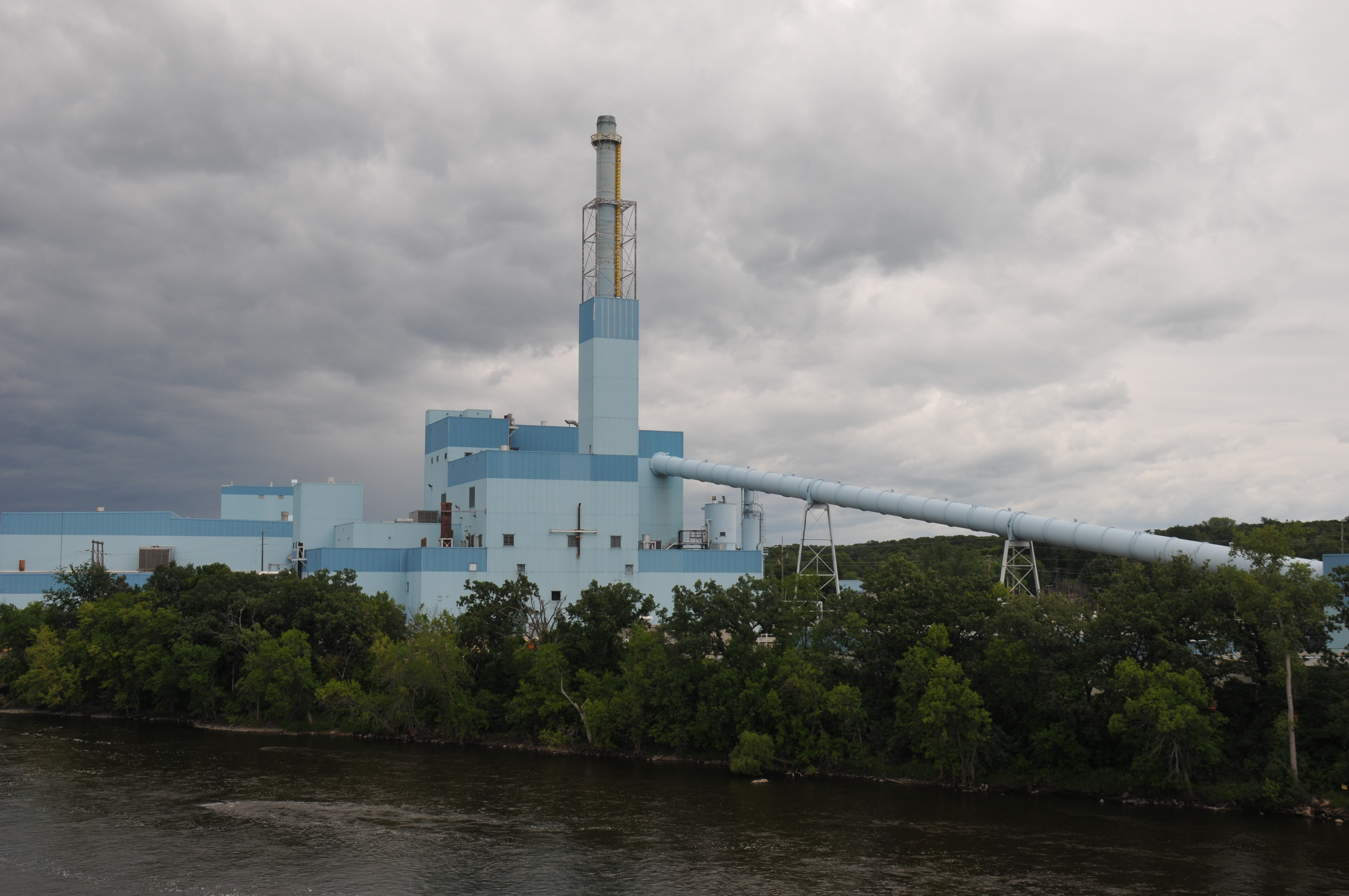
The mill in 2013 following its final closure

St. Regis was one of the first companies in the area to install equipment for fly ash removal and wastewater treatment facilities. The wastewater treatment facility was one of the first in the papermaking industry; much experimentation has been done to improve the operation. Sartell won an Izaak Walton League award for clean water related to these efforts. The mill has also been commended seven times by the Minnesota Pollution Control Agency since 1985 for excellent wastewater treatment facility operation and effluent quality.

The mill has also been a pioneer in burning bark and wastewater sludge, very significant with the solid waste considerations of today. The bark burning system went into operation in 1961 and the secondary wastewater treatment system started up in April 1973.

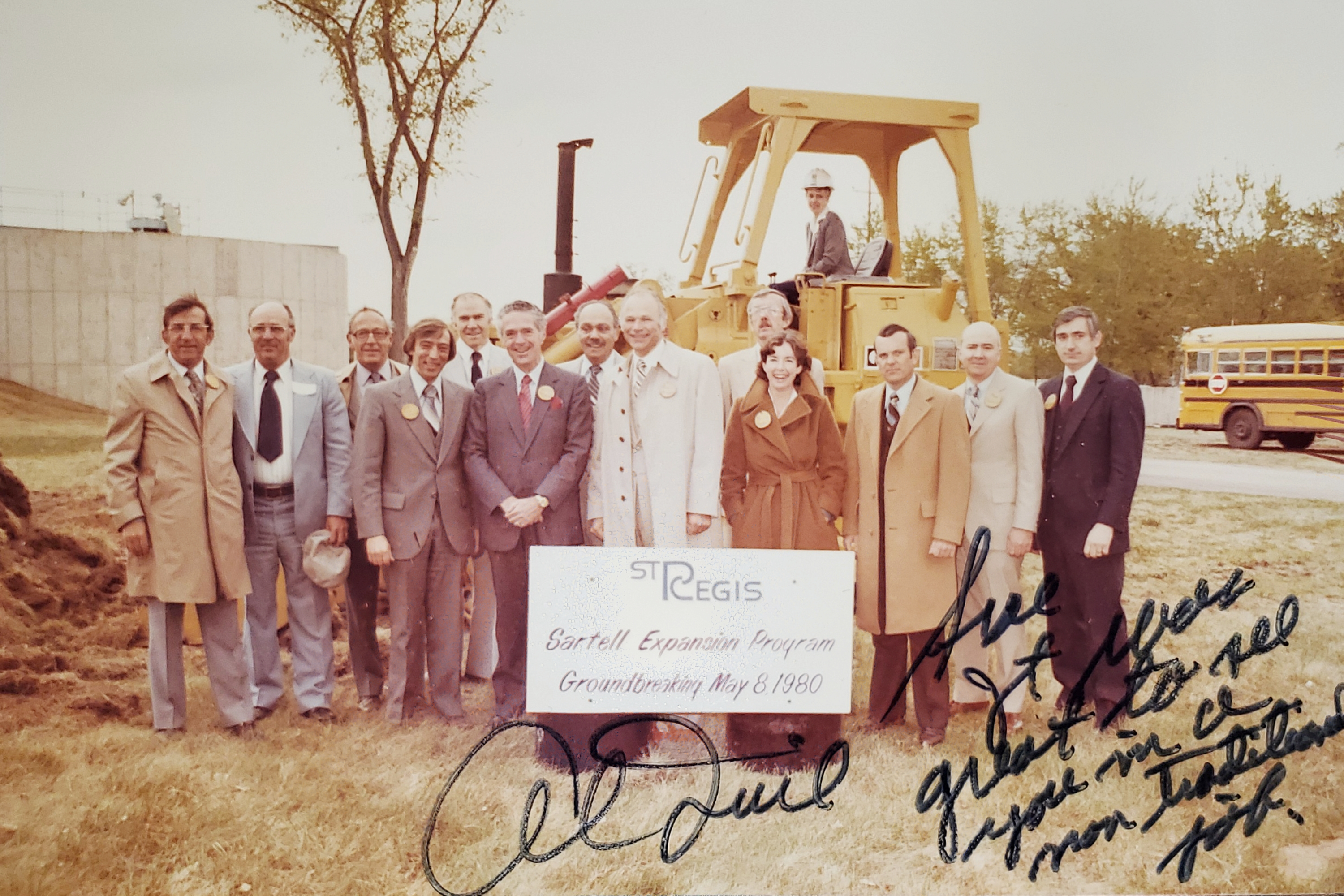
The groundbreaking for the 1980 expansion with Governor Al Quie present in the center.

Although the No. 3 paper machine project of 1982 is referred to as an expansion, it consisted almost of an entire mill replacement or rebuild. Virtually all areas were affected, except existing paper machine and supercalender areas. Existing water supply systems, filtration systems, shops, stores, primary electrical, and some effluent treatment facilities were all replaced. April 2000 brought an upgraded gap former installation, including a headbox which was replaced and updated with new dilution control technology.

No. 1 and No. 2 paper machines operate at 1,950 feet per minute and 1,880 feet per minute respectively and produce about 280 tons of publication grade paper per day. With the addition of No. 3 paper machine, currently operating at 4,150+ feet per minute, another 600 tons are produced daily.

=== Champion International ===
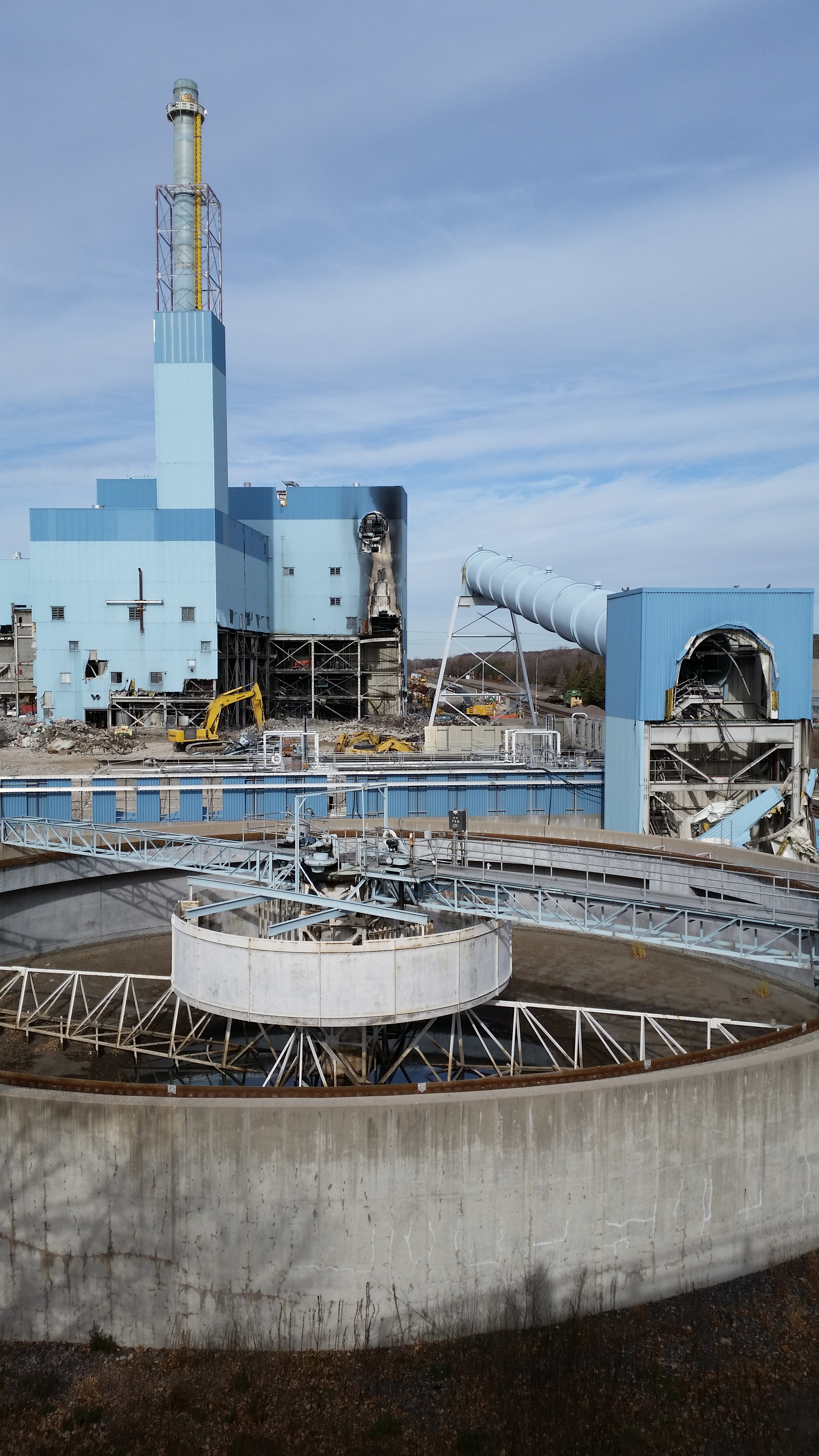
The mill in November 2014 during demolition

As a result of a giant corporate merger in 1984, St. Regis Corporation was merged with Champion International Corporation, creating leadership in the markets of coated and uncoated publication grades and newsprint to the company’s already established positions in free-sheet paper for printing, writing, converting and business.

=== International Paper ===
In June 2000, Champion was purchased by International Paper making it the world’s largest paper and forest products company.

=== Verso Paper ===
In its last years, the mill was owned and operated by Verso Paper. On May 28, 2012, there was an explosion at the paper mill that resulted in a large fire which killed one man and injured four others, taking fourteen fire departments to put out.

Verso received two citations from the Minnesota Occupational Safety and Health Administration because they did not have a sufficient and current plan for safely shutting down the mill's machinery. They were fined over $39,000.

On August 2, 2012, Verso announced that the Sartell mill would remain shut down permanently, putting about 260 employees out of work and ending over a century of papermaking in Sartell.

The site was sold to AIM Development USA in 2013. There was another fire at the mill during demolition on September 19, 2013.

The City of Sartell purchased the 51-acre mill site, plus an adjacent 167-acre parcel, on June 14th, 2023. On September 30, 2024, the City signed a Purchase Agreement with Niron Magnetics for the construction of a 150,000-square-foot facility.

== Departments ==
=== Woodyard and Woodroom ===
All of the wood is received in 8-foot lengths from the forests of Minnesota, Wisconsin and Michigan. 60% is received by rail and 40% is received by truck. Wood is unloaded to the yard which has a storage capacity of 5,000 cords.

The woodroom consists of two independent processing lines with a common bark system. Each line is designed to produce 100 cords per shift of high quality, bark-free chips.

Fir is fed through the softwood line and debarked in a 12-foot by 68-foot debarking drum. Equipment has been added for log washing and deicing prior to the drum to facilitate debarking. After debarking, the wood flows through a log inspection and sorting system where individual sticks may be recycled to the drum. Properly debarked logs are directed to a 12-knife Carthage chipper. Chips are screened and conveyed to chip storage bins.

The aspen, or hardwood, line is similar to the softwood line except that logs are debarked in a Nicholson mechanical ring debarker. Wood is chipped separately and stored in a 400-cord chip bin.

=== TMP Plant ===
The TMP plant is designed to produce up to 550 tons of pulp per day. The plant has two lines, each with three stages. Each of the six refiners are driven by two motors. The total horsepower per refining line is 32,500. The primary refiner is a pressurized unit and the secondary and tertiary refiners operate under atmospheric pressure. Chips are washed, steamed under pressure, and refined in the first stage. The pressurized refiner discharges into a cyclone which separates the pulp from the steam and supplies the pulp to the second-stage refiners. Recovered steam goes to the heat recovery system.

The TMP pulp discharged from the tertiary refiner is treated for latency removal, series screened, cleaned, thickened, and stored in two medium density storage tanks. Screened rejects are further refined, screened, and cleaned before storage. The unbleached TMP is recovered from storage and bleached to brightness levels in the bleach plant.

=== Kraft Preparation ===
Bleached kraft is received in bales from Canadian mills. Fork trucks deliver a six-bale stack to bale handling equipment for destacking and dewiring. A dewiring system, the first automatic one in the industry, dewires bales before they are dumped from the conveyor to the pulper; the slush pulp is then pumped to a soak chest, refiners, and storage tank.

=== Coating Preparation ===
The process is based on the conversion of starch in the presence of clay. Coating ingredients are mixed in a slurry makedown tank, screened, and pumped continuously through various stages for enzyme addition and cooking.

Coating is discharged into a flash tank where flash steam is directed to a condensing chamber where heat is recovered as hot water. Finished coating is stored for eventual use on the paper machines.

=== No. 3 Paper Machine ===
The initial planning for No. 3 began early in 1978. Decisions were made regarding the design at that time using experience gained from the operation of No. 5 paper machine at Bucksport, Maine. Both machines are the same size and general configuration. The fabric width is 314 inches, design speed was 3,500 feet per minute, and the maximum salable trim is 280 inches. The design basis weight was 34# and at design speed, the machine would produce 480 tons per day. Modifications have since been made and No. 3 paper machine now operates at 4,150+ feet per minute, producing 600 tons of salable paper per day.

A Voith dilution control headbox was selected to improve the ability to control profile and formation.

A gap former was chosen to improve sheet formation and paper quality essential to raw stock manufacture.

The press section is a Beloit twinver with an inclined straight-through, grooved third press. This type of press section was selected because of its cleanliness during operation, efficient water removal capability, and successful operation in the past.

The main dryer section consists of 43 six-foot dryers split into four sections.

The two-roll machine calender is equipped with two variable crown rolls and heating capability for caliper control.

The Beloit short-dwell nip coaters and later EXCEL Coaters in 1998 were included to apply five pounds of coating to each side of the sheet. Conservation measures have also been taken in reclaiming coating and recycling it to the coated broke system for recovery.

=== Paper Finishing ===
From the paper machine reel, the paper is trimmed on a rereeler prior to being sent to two ten-roll Beloit supercalenders. The supercalenders impart a smooth, glossy finish to the paper’s surface, improving appearance and print quality. The paper is wound onto individual rolls on a Jagenberg vari-top single drum winder. The maximum design speed of this unit is 8,500 feet per minute. This winder is also highly automated to maximize productivity.

=== Roll Wrapper ===
The paper from the entire mill is wrapped by a low profile, semi-automated roll wrapper system, averaging 750 rolls per day. Roll tickets use a barcode for identification and inventory control.

=== Warehouse ===
The paper warehouse can store up to 5,000 tons of finished paper and fifteen railroad cars, ten for loading paper and five for unloading kraft, can be “spotted” inside the building. This amount of storage is necessitated with this seasonable type of business.

=== Power Plant ===
Steam is generated in a Babcock & Wilcox stoker-fired coal boiler with a capacity of 270,000 pounds of steam per hour. The boiler is designed to burn a combination of coal, bark, wastewater sludge, and tire chips. Steam is distributed to process at 450, 150, and 50 psi.

A Brown Boveri double-extraction back-pressure turbine (manufactured in St. Cloud) has also been installed. The unit can generate 20.8 MW at maximum, but the actual generation is dictated by steam usage.

The primary fuel is low-sulfur Kentucky coal, delivered by truck. The coal is unloaded into a concrete lined storage area. Belt conveyors transport the coal to the crusher/transfer house, then to the boiler bunker.

The mill uses and returns (cleaner than the river itself) ten million gallons of water per day. Mill effluent is treated in the primary clarifier for solids removal. An activated sludge aeration basin with secondary clarifier is used for BOD reduction before discharge to the Mississippi River. Sludge from the clarifiers is dewatered on a belt filter press and a screw press. The thickened sludge is mixed with bark and fed to the boiler for incineration.

=== Mill Computer Systems ===
Automation technology is critical to the operations of the Sartell mill. Many computer based systems work together to account for and to improve the quality of mill products.

Some of them are:

- The process control systems constantly monitor and control thousands of process variables such as pressure, flow, temperature, and tank levels in the area of pulp production, stock preparation, coating and additives, electrical and steam generation and effluent treatment.
- The on-machine scanning systems measure and control the standards of the paper produced on each machine. Every grade of paper is made to conform to measurements such as moisture, basis weight, coating weight and caliper.
- PLC (Programmable Logic Control) Systems (Allen Bradley, Reliance) control the stopping, starting, and speed control of most mill equipment including the speed of, and draw between each section of the paper machine.
- The product tracking system monitors the production from the paper machines to customer delivery which includes inventory, manifesting, billing, and shipping.
- The corporate mainframe systems, located in Plano, Texas, provide for purchasing, accounting, payroll, storeroom, and human resource functions, along with customer order entry.
- Local Information Systems provide mill personnel with timely information from mill systems, and the tools to perform analysis on, graphically display, generate reports from, and store this information.
- More than 300 networked personal computers provide access to most of the mill’s systems and databases. These computers also provide e-mail, scheduling, internet access, as well as other desktop applications.

High speed fiber optic cables throughout the mill network these systems to provide a mill-wide system of control.
