= Locust Plague of 1874 =

Infestation of the Great Plains in the US and Canada

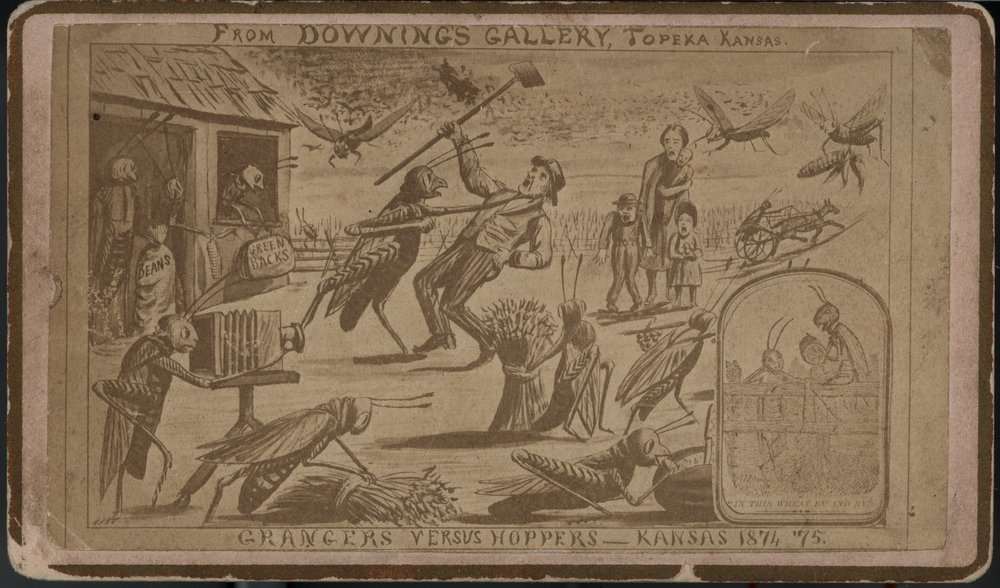
- 1875 cartoon by Henry Worrall depicting Kansas farmers battling giant grasshoppers
- Date: 1874
- Location: Great Plains (United States, Canada)
- Type: Infestation
- Cause: Locusts

The Locust Plague of 1874, or the Grasshopper Plague of 1874, was a large swarm Rocky Mountain locusts over the Great Plains in the United States and Canada during the summer of 1874. The locusts caused hundreds of millions of dollar's worth of damage over an estimated 2 million sq mi (5.2 million km^{2}). Residents described swarms so thick that they covered the sun for up to six hours. This was considered the last great swarm of this species of locust, which is theorized to have become extinct.

== Area ==
The locust swarming area encompassed the Dakota Territory, the Montana Territory, the Wyoming Territory, the Colorado Territory, Iowa, Minnesota, Missouri, Nebraska, Kansas, the Indian Territory, and Texas. The locusts also reached the Northwest Territories and Manitoba; one 1877 observer theorized that a range of coniferous timber prevented them from moving into some parts of Saskatchewan.

The United States Entomological Commission wrote in 1880 that the swarm "covered a swath equal to the combined areas of Connecticut, Delaware, Maine, Maryland, Massachusetts, New Hampshire, New Jersey, New York, Pennsylvania, Rhode Island, and Vermont."

== Damage ==
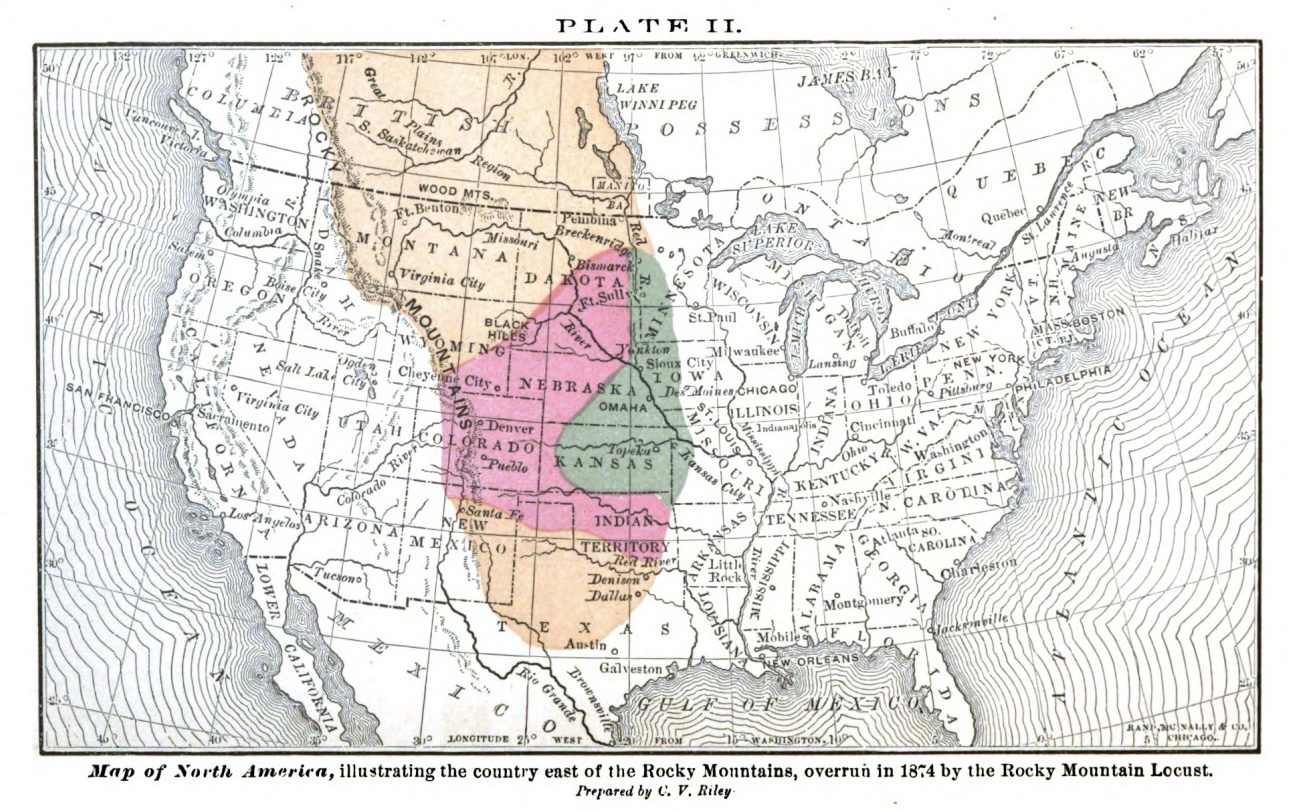
Plate II from Riley's The locust plague in the United States (1877), showing extent of damage in 1874

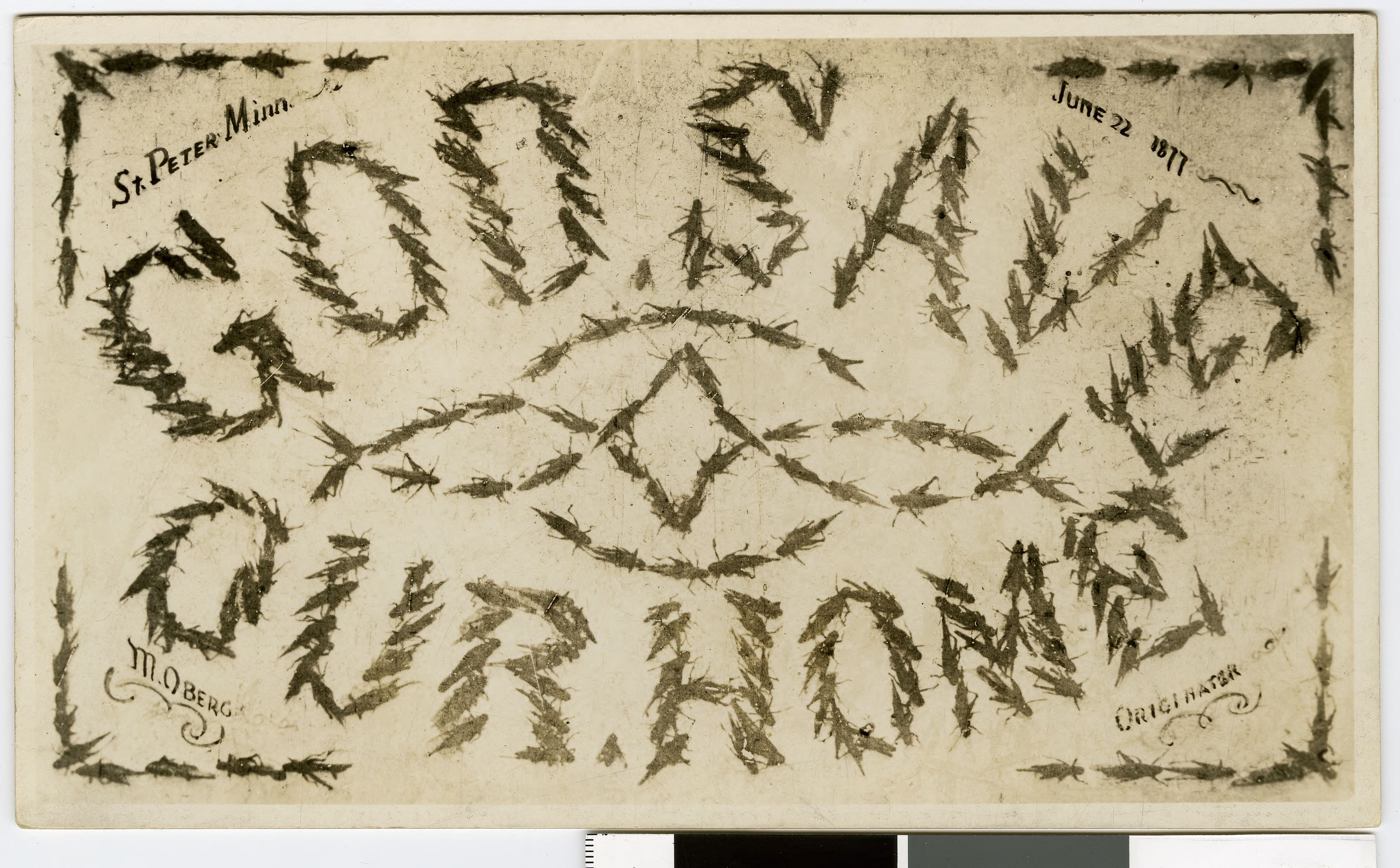
Postcard illustrating the terrible locust invasions of Minnesota and the surrounding area, with bodies of locusts spelling out the words "God Save Our Home." Nicollet County Historical Society collection

Compared to previous swarms in the region, the 1874 Locust Plague was significantly more damaging. The invasion coincided with a record drought in the Midwest and Great Plains, which induced the grasshoppers (estimated at 120 billion to 12.5 trillion) to not only thrive but also to swarm. This is typical of locust behavior, in which a population boom occurs after a drought period followed by abundant vegetation. The arriving locusts could pile up to over a foot high and allegedly ate crops, trees, leaves, grass, wool off sheep, harnesses on horses, paint from wagons, and pitchfork handles.

The locusts reportedly ate for several days from fields and trees and in some instances also ate food inside the farmers' homes before they moved on. Carpets and clothes were damaged by the locusts in the process. Locust excrement and carcasses could pile up to pollute ponds and streams. Train tracks "slick with grasshopper guts" caused trains to lose traction, according to the book It Happened in Nebraska.

A Kansas pioneer was quoted as saying, "They looked like a great, white glistening cloud, for their wings caught the sunshine on them and made them look like a cloud of white vapor." Another Kansas settler said, "I never saw such a sight before. This morning, as we looked up toward the sun, we could see millions in the air. They looked like snowflakes." Nebraska historian Addison E. Sheldon described the scene: "In a clear, hot July day a haze came over the sun. The haze deepened into a gray cloud. Suddenly the cloud resolved itself into billions of gray grasshoppers sweeping down upon the earth. The vibration of their wings filled the ear with a roaring sound like a rushing storm. As far as the eye could reach in every direction the air was filled with them. Where they alighted, they covered the ground like a heavy crawling carpet."

Farmers tried killing the locusts with fire and exploding gunpowder, but in one case the mass of locusts smothered the flames. Other unsuccessful efforts to stop the plague included covering fields with sheets and smoking grasshoppers away from crops and into water and oil-filled ditches to drown them. A hopperdozer, with a scraper was coated with coal tar and pulled by horses, was employed in places to fight the grasshoppers. Dragged against the wind, young locusts would be blown into the tar, but it only worked on flat fields.

Missouri's state entomologist at the time, Charles Valentine Riley, documented much of the 1874 swarm and compiled illustrations and data on the grasshoppers. He advocated for additional culinary uses of the locusts swarms, noting many other cultures considered locusts food. It is unknown how many citizens took this advice, as many farmers at the time, due to the aforementioned pollution, erroneously considered the grasshoppers to be poisonous.

== Relief efforts ==
Crop damage caused by the locusts was estimated at more than $200 million. Losses from the combination of the plague and the drought were hard to recoup as the country was still in the Long Depression triggered by the Panic of 1873.

Local officials were worried that farmers would give up and move away and that western settlement would suffer, so initially the governors of Kansas and Nebraska established private relief agencies to distribute food and supplies rather than seek state or federal assistance. The Nebraska Relief and Aid Association, organized in September 1874, collected "money, provisions, clothing, fuel, seeds and other necessary supplies" from private sources. Similarly, the local and state governments of Minnesota encouraged charitable donations and worked to get rid of the grasshoppers rather than providing direct relief to affected farmers.

The prevalent attitude of the time toward public assistance was that only the "deserving poor" should receive help. "Deserving" was defined as meaning that their poverty was not the result of immorality, idleness, or individual failure. Farmers themselves shared this perspective, and some refused to accept any help except in the form of temporary loans.

But an exception had been made for the 1871 Great Chicago Fire, when that city had received substantial relief from private citizens, corporations and other cities. In 1874, grasshopper aid organizations cited the national response to the Chicago Fire to justify assisting grasshopper victims, and counties sent representatives east to solicit aid. Farmers unaffected by the plague donated supplies, including barley and corn to Kansas farmers. In the ensuing winter, the Kansas Central Relief Committee received 124 carloads of donations; railroads carried supplies for free. In January 1875, Nebraska Gov. Robert W. Furnas reported more than $68,000 had been received in cash and in-kind donations.

State officials eventually realized that state coffers would have to be opened to provide aid. In January 1875, Nebraska Gov. Furnas recommended, and the state legislature approved, the issuing of $50,000 in state bonds to purchase seed for grasshopper victims. In Kansas, Gov. Thomas A. Osborn convinced the legislature to approve $73,000 in aid bonds. In both Nebraska and Kansas, farmers had to prove they were destitute and had nothing left to sell in order to receive assistance.

The federal government's response was initially limited to an executive order in November 1874 by President Ulysses S. Grant authorizing the distribution of surplus and condemned army clothing in Kansas and Nebraska. Reports began to be received that more help was needed to prevent starvation. An Army major sent to inspect southwestern Nebraska wrote General Edward O. C. Ord, commander of the Department of the Platte, to say that "The destitution existing here is much greater than I expected. Relief must be given these people or hundreds will starve before the winter is half over." In December 1874, Kansas Agricultural Secretary Alfred Gray reported to Governor Osborn "that as much as 70 percent of the population was impoverished in the worst hit counties."

In 1875, the federal government eased residency requirements for homesteaders so that farmers could leave their farms to seek aid, and Congress supplied $30,000 in seeds to the area, and in 1876 the government reported quote "The Rocky Mountain Locust is the most serious impediment to the settlement of the West." Along with food and clothing from the Army, these measures were one of the first efforts by the federal government to provide emergency aid and support to western farmers. According to historian Sam S. Kepfield, "To use funds from the public treasury for disaster relief was almost unheard-of. ... Public funds were for public uses only, and allowing farmers to carry on at their normal labors did not qualify as a public use." Steven R. Kinsella, author of 900 Miles from Nowhere, writes the grasshopper plagues of the 1870s "started a relationship between agricultural producers and the government that continues to this day."

The government's response to the swarm also created the United States Entomological Commission, consisting of the top entomologists of the day, to prevent future locust plagues. One of the Commissioners, Riley, wrote in his 1877 book The Locust Plague in the United States that death and famine in the affected regions were averted by the aid.

Grasshopper plagues continued on the Great Plains during the next two years. An estimated 3.5-trillion-grasshopper plague occurred in June 1875, but for several springs after the 1874 invasion, farmers turned up millions of grasshopper eggs while plowing their fields, which destroyed the eggs in the process. An early frost in spring 1875 also helped to combat future infestations. The population of Rocky Mountain locusts continued to decline each year after 1874; development of the West may explain their extinction by the early 1900s.

== Cultural impact ==
Laura Ingalls Wilder wrote about the locust devastation of her family's Minnesota farm in one of her memoir books for children, On the Banks of Plum Creek.

Ole Edvart Rølvaag described the plagues in his novel Giants in the Earth. The locust plague also appears in the opera of the same name based on the novel.
