= Giants in the Earth =

Giants in the Earth may refer to:

- Giants in the Earth (novel), a 1924/1925 novel by Ole Edvart Rølvaag
- Giants in the Earth (opera), a 1951 adaptation of the novel, by Douglas Moore
