= Hard Winter of 1880–81 =

Season of blizzards and other severe weather in the United States

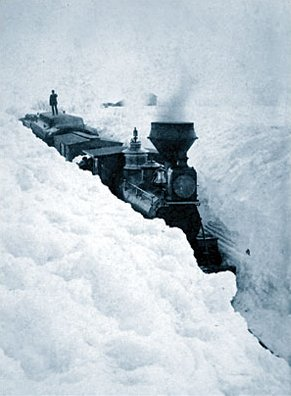
- A snow blockade in southern Minnesota during the Hard Winter. On March 29, 1881, snowdrifts in Minnesota were higher than locomotives.

Meteorological history
- Formed: October 15, 1880
- Dissipated: April 1881

The winter of 1880-81 in the United States, referred to as the Hard Winter, the Long Winter or the Snow Winter, was a period of extreme cold and large snowfalls across the central Great Plains region. The winter is depicted in the 1940 novel The Long Winter by Laura Ingalls Wilder, the 1920s novel Giants in the Earth by Ole Edvart Rølvaag, and other fictional works.

== Duration and effects on train transport ==
The Hard Winter began on October 15, 1880, with a blizzard in southeastern Dakota Territory and lasted until April 1881. Some railroads in the region were covered with so much snow that it could not be cleared and trains could not pass, cutting off towns from critical supplies.

== Clogging of the Missouri River and permanent changes in its course ==
An abrupt spring thaw followed the Hard Winter, and flooding along the Mississippi and Missouri rivers caused more hardship. Many towns were damaged, and some were abandoned after the flooding. A flood in Omaha permanently changed the course of the Missouri River. Massive ice jams clogged the Missouri River, and when they broke the downstream areas were inundated. Most of the town of Yankton, in what is now South Dakota, was washed away when the river overflowed its banks after the thaw.

== Autobiographical narrative on rationing by Laura Ingalls Wilder ==
The Long Winter by Laura Ingalls Wilder was once believed to be a fictionalized account of the Hard Winter, which Wilder lived through when she was a teenager. She describes how the winter affected her family and fellow settlers, forcing them to ration food and fuel. The weather details in the book have since been corroborated by meteorological records and other historical accounts of the winter and her accounts are now considered to be mostly factual.

== Relevant references ==
- Boustead, Barbara E. The Hard Winter of 1880-1881: Climatological context and communication via a Laura Ingalls Wilder narrative. The University of Nebraska-Lincoln, 2014.
- Boustead, Barbara Mayes. "Extreme Winter: Weaving Weather and Climate into a Narrative Through Laura Ingalls Wilder." In Extreme Weather, Health, and Communities: Interdisciplinary Engagement Strategies, pp. 271-292. Cham, Switzerland: Springer International Publishing, 2016.
- Taylor, Olivia N. "Perpetuating a “Frontier Myth:” The Long Winter and a “Weather Frontier”." The Gettysburg Historical Journal 24, no. 1 (2025): 80-99.
- Votruba, Stanley E. "Merciless days of snow, ice, floods-1880-81." (2012). pp. 17-26.
- White, Dan L. 2011. The Long Hard Winter of 1880-81: What was it Really Like? CreateSpace Independent Publishing Platform.
