= Brenda Miller Cooper =

American operatic soprano (1916–2008)

Brenda Miller Cooper (28 February 1916 in Cleveland, Ohio – 3 April 2008 in Baltimore, Maryland) was an American operatic soprano. She studied voice at Case Western Reserve University earning a bachelor's degree in music, after which she pursued graduate studies at the Juilliard School where she earned a Masters in vocal performance. She made her professional opera debut with the Philadelphia Opera Company (billed as Brenda Miller) on November 29, 1943 as Micaëla in Georges Bizet's Carmen with Alice Howland in the title role, Joseph Laderoute as Don José, Giovanni de Surra as Escamillo, and Sylvan Levin conducting. Later that season she returned to that house to portray the title role in Giacomo Puccini's Tosca and Rosalinde in Johann Strauss II's Die Fledermaus.

Miller made her first recital appearance at New York City's Town Hall in 1945. She became a regular performer at the New York City Opera during the late 1940s into the 1950s, making her debut with the company as Tatiana in the company's first production of Pyotr Ilyich Tchaikovsky's Eugene Onegin with director Theodore Komisarjevsky in 1947. Cooper is perhaps best remembered for portraying the role of Beret in the world premiere of Douglas Moore's Pulitzer Prize-winning opera, Giants in the Earth in 1951. She also performed several times with the CBS Orchestra.

Cooper retired from the stage in the early 1960s after developing a spinal-cord tumor which left her paralyzed for a couple of years. She underwent surgery which enabled her to walk again and then began a second career as a voice teacher. She taught on the voice faculty of Montclair State University for more than two decades, after which she taught voice privately out of her home up until her death in 2008. Cooper was married to Harold Cooper, an industrial machinery salesman, from 1946 until Harold's death in 1993. The couple had two sons, David and Thomas, both of whom became medical doctors. A longtime resident of Teaneck, New Jersey, she died on 3 April 2008 at the age of 92.
