= Laurel Hurley =

American soprano (1927–2013)

- Born: February 14, 1927; Allentown, Pennsylvania, U.S.
- Died: December 6, 2013 (aged 86); Allentown, Pennsylvania, U.S.
- Education: William Allen High School; Hartt School of Music
- Occupation: Soprano
- Years active: 1943–2013
- Spouse: J. Peter Butz

Laurel Hurley (February 14, 1927 – December 6, 2013) was an American soprano who had an active performance career in the mid-20th century. She performed a diverse repertoire from musical theatre, operetta and opera, encompassing roles in the lyric soprano and coloratura soprano repertoire.

While most often heard in works from the standard opera canon by Mozart, Puccini, Verdi, and other composers, she also performed in the premieres of Thomas Arne's Comus, Christoph Willibald Gluck's Paride ed Elena, and Darius Milhaud's Médée. Her performances and recordings in operas such as Vincenzo Bellini's La sonnambula and I Capuleti e i Montecchi, and Gioachino Rossini's La Cenerentola, and The Barber of Seville in the United States. contributed to the Bel canto revival movement of the 1950s.

Hurley was a principal artist at the Metropolitan Opera from 1955 through 1967, and performed with other American opera companies like the New York City Opera, Opera Company of Boston, New Orleans Opera, and Santa Fe Opera. Her voice is preserved on complete opera recordings made with the Met, including the roles of the Queen of the Night in Mozart's The Magic Flute (1957) and Mussetta in Puccini's La bohème (1958). She also made several recordings of complete operas with the American Opera Society (AOS) on disc and the NBC Opera Theatre for television.

== Early life and education ==
Hurley was born in Allentown, Pennsylvania, on February 14, 1927, into a Pennsylvania Dutch family. Her mother was a church organist and she received her initial music education from her.

After graduating from William Allen High School in Allentown, she studied voice at the Hartt College of Music, now the University of Hartford Hartt School, in West Hartford, Connecticut. As a Hartt College student, she performed the role of Norina in Don Pasquale in the school's opera production.

== Career ==
=== 1940s ===
Hurley made her Broadway debut in 1943 at the age of 16 as Kathie in Sigmund Romberg’s operetta The Student Prince. She continued with that production after it left Broadway to go on tour. In 1947 she portrayed Margot Bonvalet opposite baritone Edward Roecker's Pierre Birabeau in Sigmund Romberg's The Desert Song at the Detroit Opera. In 1948 she starred in a revival of Jerome Kern's 1925 musical Sunny at the St. Louis Municipal Opera with Patricia Bowman and Hal Le Roy. In 1949 she portrayed Violetta in Giuseppe Verdi's La traviata in a televised version of the opera made by the DuMont Television Network with Paul Franke as Alfredo.

=== 1950s and 1960s ===
In 1951, Hurley was awarded the Walter W. Naumburg Foundation Award after touring as a lead soprano with the Charles L. Wagner Opera Company. In March 1952 she portrayed Philine in Ambroise Thomas's Mignon at the New Orleans Opera with Blanche Thebom in the title role. She starred as Nina in the operetta A Night in Venice, which utilized the music of Johann Strauss II with an original story and lyrics by Ruth and Thomas Martin, at the Jones Beach Theater in the summer of 1952.

On October 25, 1952, Hurley performed the role of Micaëla in Georges Bizet's Carmen for her debut with the New York City Opera at New York City Center. She performed several more roles with them over the next three years, including Susanna in The Marriage of Figaro (1952), Rosalinda in Die Fledermaus (1953), Gretel in Hansel and Gretel (1953), Violetta in La traviata (1954), and Magnolia in Show Boat (1954). She notably performed the role of Clorinda in Rossini's La Cenerentola in 1953 with the New York City Opera; an opera which had not been heard in New York for 125 years previously. During her time with the New York City Opera she began performing with the NBC Opera Theatre in televised operas and live concerts. This included live performances of Mozart's Così fan tutte as Fiordiligi (1953), and televised performances as Countess Almaviva in The Marriage of Figaro (1954) and the Queen of the Night to Leontyne Price's Pamina in The Magic Flute (1956). She also portrayed Laurie in Rodgers and Hammerstein's Oklahoma! at the Salt Lake City Music Festival on the campus of the University of Utah in the summer of 1954.

Hurley performed in several rarely performed operas during her career, including the roles of Helen of Troy in the United States premiere of Christoph Willibald Gluck's Paride ed Elena with the American Chamber Opera Society at The Town Hall on January 15, 1954; and Creuse in the United States premiere of Darius Milhaud's Médée at the Brandeis University Music Festival with Phyllis Curtin in the title role on June 11, 1955. She made her debut with the American Opera Society (AOS) in 1955 as Amina in Bellini's La Sonnambula with Cesare Siepi as Rodolfo; a work which was rarely staged at that time in history. In 1957 she performed the role of Giulietta in Bellini's I Capuleti e i Montecchi at Carnegie Hall with the AOS; an opera which had not been performed in the United States for one hundred years previously. She also performed and recorded the role of Wanda in Offenbach's La Grande-Duchesse de Gérolstein with the AOS at Carnegie Hall in 1959. In 1958 she starred in the American premiere of Thomas Arne's Comus presented by The Little Orchestra Society. In 1960, 1965, 1967, and 1968, she was a soloist with the Naumburg Orchestral Concerts, in the Naumburg Bandshell in Central Park, in the summer series.

Hurley made her debut at the Metropolitan Opera ("The Met") on February 8, 1955, as Oscar in Giuseppe Verdi's Un ballo in maschera with Zinka Milanov as Amelia, Richard Tucker as Riccardo, and Dimitri Mitropoulos conducting. She was a principal artist at the Met for the next 12 years where her repertoire included the roles of Adele in Die Fledermaus, Adina in L'elisir d'amore, Arsena in The Gypsy Baron, Despina in Così fan tutte, Fiakermilli in Arabella, Flower Maiden in Parsifal, the Forest Bird in Siegfried, Gilda in Rigoletto, the Happy Shade in Orfeo ed Euridice, Jouvenot in Adriana Lecouvreur, Kitty in The Last Savage, Lady Harriet Durham in Martha, Lauretta in Gianni Schicchi, Marzelline in Fidelio, Micaela in Carmen, both Mimi and Musetta in La bohème, Najade in Ariadne auf Naxos, Nedda in Pagliacci, Norina in Don Pasquale, Olympia in The Tales of Hoffmann, Papagena and the Queen of the Night in The Magic Flute, Rosina in The Barber of Seville, Sophie in Der Rosenkavalier, Susanna in The Marriage of Figaro, Violetta in La traviata, Xenia in Boris Godunov, Zerlina in Don Giovanni, and the title role in La Périchole.

Hurley performed the title role in Douglas Moore's The Ballad of Baby Doe several times, including with the Central City Opera in 1959 and the Santa Fe Opera in 1961. In 1962 she performed the role of Lola Markham in Moore's Gallantry for a televised version of the opera for CBS. She gave one of her few international performances with the Israel Philharmonic Orchestra in Tel Aviv on July 18, 1961; starring in a concert performance of Mozart's Così fan tutte under conductor Thomas Schippers in celebration of the orchestra's 25th anniversary. In 1966 she portrayed Zerlina in the Opera Company of Boston's production of Don Giovanni under conductor Sarah Caldwell. In 1967, she performed a recital at The Town Hall with pianist Samuel Sanders in a program that included Wolfgang Amadeus Mozart's Exsultate, jubilate, the world premieres of two art songs by Sergius Kagen, and works by Poulenc and Debussy. In his review in The New York Times, music critic Theodore Strongin stated, "Laurel Hurley was in fresh voice and sang with charm all over the place. There was a strong connection between performer and music here."

== Recordings ==
In 1960, RCA Victor released a live 1957 recording of The Magic Flute from the Met starring Hurley as the Queen of the Night with Lucine Amara as Pamina and Brian Sullivan as Tamino. In 2011 Sony Classical released a live 1958 recording of La bohème from the Metropolitan Opera with Hurley as Musetta that had previously not been available. Other cast members included Licia Albanese as Mimi, Carlo Bergonzi as Rodolfo, and Mario Sereni as Marcello with Thomas Schippers conducting. Hurley also recorded excerpts of several operas as part of her work with the Met for Columbia Records, including selections from Rigoletto, The Tales of Hoffmann, and Die Fledermaus. She also performed the role of Perichole on television when the Met production was adapted for broadcast on the program Omnibus in 1958.

== Personal life ==
In 1958, Hurley, then residing with her family in Englewood, New Jersey, gave birth to her second child with her husband J. Peter Butz. After 1967, she mainly retired from performance. In the 1980s, she periodically performed in concerts in New Jersey with the Sutton Ensemble.

== Death ==
She lived in retirement in Allentown, Pennsylvania, where she died on December 6, 2013, at the age of 86.
