= Arnold Sundgaard =

American playwright, librettist, and lyricist (1909–2006)

- Born: October 31, 1909; Saint Paul, Minnesota, U.S.
- Died: October 22, 2006 (aged 96); Dallas, Texas, U.S.
- Awards: Guggenheim Fellowship (1951); MacDowell fellowship

Academic background
- Education: University of Wisconsin–Madison College of Letters and Science

Arnold Olaf Sundgaard (October 31, 1909 – October 22, 2006) was an American playwright, librettist, and lyricist. He was also a writer of short stories and children's books as well as a college professor specializing in drama and theatrics. Sundgaard was best known for his role in the production of six Broadway plays.

== Background ==
Sundgaard was born in Saint Paul, Minnesota, and was of Norwegian descent. He attended Johnson Senior High School in Saint Paul, where he played football with Warren E. Burger. He then attended the University of Wisconsin, graduating with a bachelor's degree in English in 1935; he also studied at the Yale Drama School. He taught drama at a number of schools, including Columbia University, Bennington College, and the University of Texas. Sundgaaard was awarded a Guggenheim Fellowship in the field of music research in 1951.

== Career ==
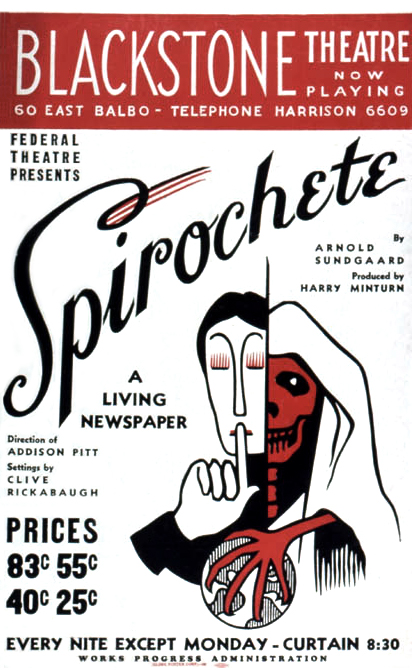
Poster for the original production of Spirochete, a Living Newspaper play by Arnold Sundgaard produced by the Federal Theatre Project (1938)

Sundgaard worked with the Federal Theatre Project early in his career. In 1938, the FTP produced, as part of the Living Newspaper series, his play Spirochete: A History, about the spread of syphilis. The play, the writing of which had been encouraged by Susan Glaspell, was a hit in Chicago at its premiere, but met with tremendous protest upon its transfer to Philadelphia.

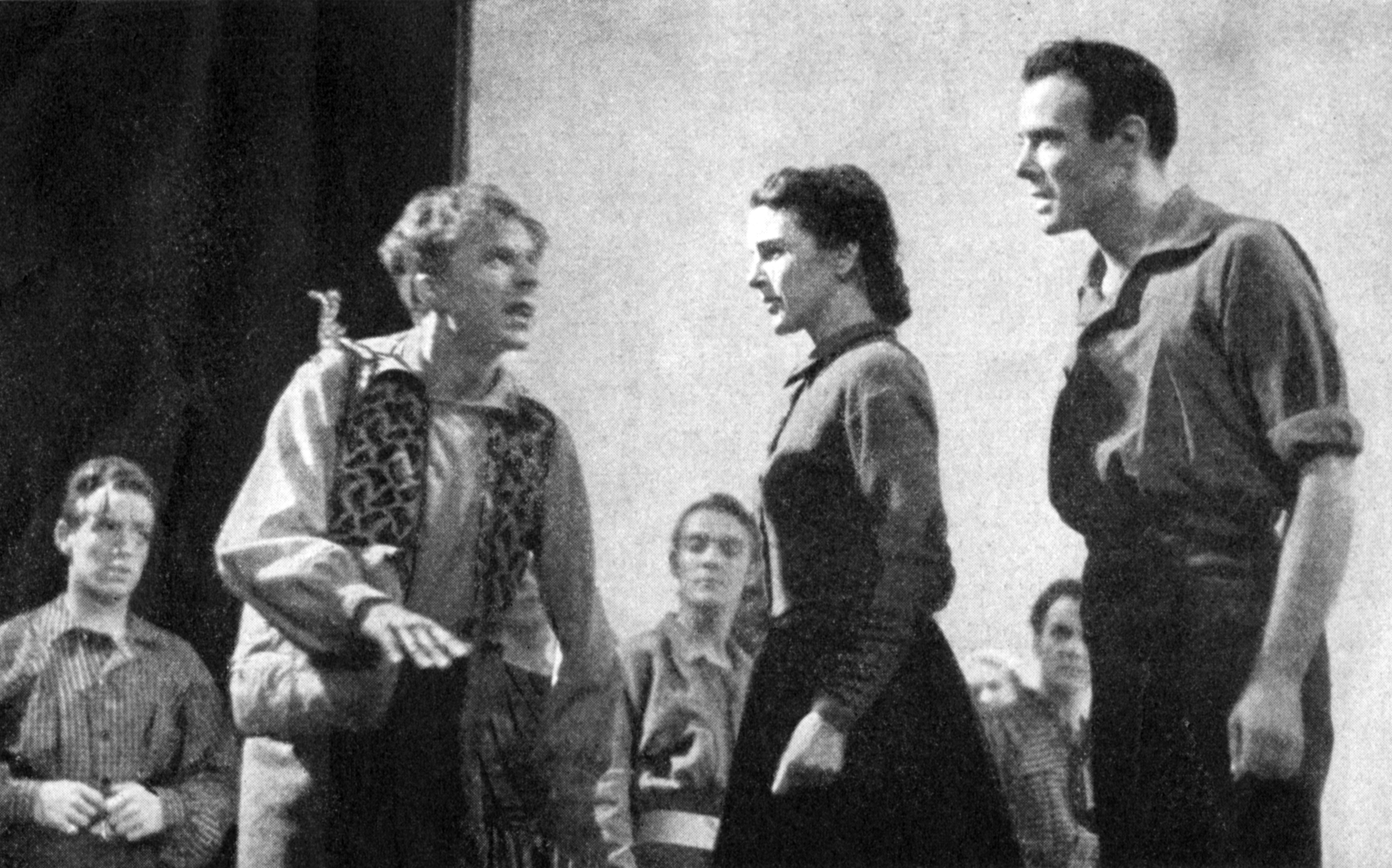
Norman Lloyd, Katherine Emery and Dean Jagger in the Broadway production of Everywhere I Roam (1938)

His first play for Broadway was a collaboration with Marc Connelly; titled Everywhere I Roam, it lasted 13 performances in 1938 and 1939. T. Edward Hambleton (1953–2005) produced his plays The First Crocus in 1942 and The Great Campaign in 1947; each lasted five performances only. Of Love Remembered appeared in 1967, directed by Burgess Meredith and starring Ingrid Thulin.

Sundgaard wrote the libretti for close to a dozen operas and musicals by composers such as Alec Wilder, Douglas Moore, and Kurt Weill. With Moore he wrote the opera Giants in the Earth, after the novel by Ole Edvart Rølvaag; it won the Pulitzer Prize for Music in 1951. In 1952, he wrote The Lowland Sea with Wilder. In 1948, he and Weill collaborated on the folk opera Down in the Valley, and in 1944 he and Leonard Louis Levinson (1904–1974), wrote the book for Rhapsody, a collaboration with Fritz Kreisler and John Latouche. Another opera with Moore, Gallantry, a parody of television soap operas, was premiered by the Columbia University School of Music in 1958. With Victor Ziskin he wrote the short-lived The Young Abe Lincoln, which played briefly on Broadway in 1961. Sundgaard was also a lyricist, writing words to several songs by Wilder. "How Lovely is Christmas" was recorded by Bing Crosby; "Where Do You Go?" was recorded by Frank Sinatra and released on his 1959 album No One Cares.

Often overlooked in Sundgaard's works, in 1946 the State of Utah's Centennial Commission commissioned Sundgaard to be the librettist and lyricist for the musical originally titled The Promised Valley and later just Promised Valley, to celebrate the centennial of the arrival of the Mormon pioneers to the Salt Lake Valley in 1847. At the suggestion of Maurice Abravanel, newly engaged to conduct the community orchestra in Utah, the Commission initially approached Abravanel's famous friend for whom he had been a pit conductor in New York, Kurt Weill, to write the music for their new musical, and while he declined, Weill suggested Sundgaard (with whom Weill had worked) as the librettist. Crawford Gates, a young LDS composer, composed the music. The musical premiered in Salt Lake City in July 1947, and was considered a commercial and critical success. A shortened version played for tourists in downtown Salt Lake City's Temple Square every summer for eighteen years, and the musical has been revived in Utah several times since. In 1975, Sundgaard collaborated with LDS composer K. Newell Dayley to write the musical "Brigham!" as part of the celebrations for Brigham Young University's centennial year, with Dayley composing the music and Sundgaard writing the book and lyrics.

Besides theatrical work, Sundgaard wrote nonfiction for The New Yorker and Atlantic Monthly, among other publications. With Eric Carle, he also wrote children's books, such as The Lamb and the Butterfly of 1988; his The Bear who Loved Puccini, published in 1992, was illustrated by Dominic Catalano.

== Personal life ==
Sundgaard counted among his friends Studs Terkel and Gregory Peck. His first marriage, to Margaret Christiansen, ended in divorce; his second marriage, to Marge Kane, ended at her death in 1998. He died at his home in Dallas, Texas, and was survived by a son and two daughters; another son predeceased him, in 1985.
