= Recitative =

Ordinary speech-like singing in opera, cantata, mass or oratorio

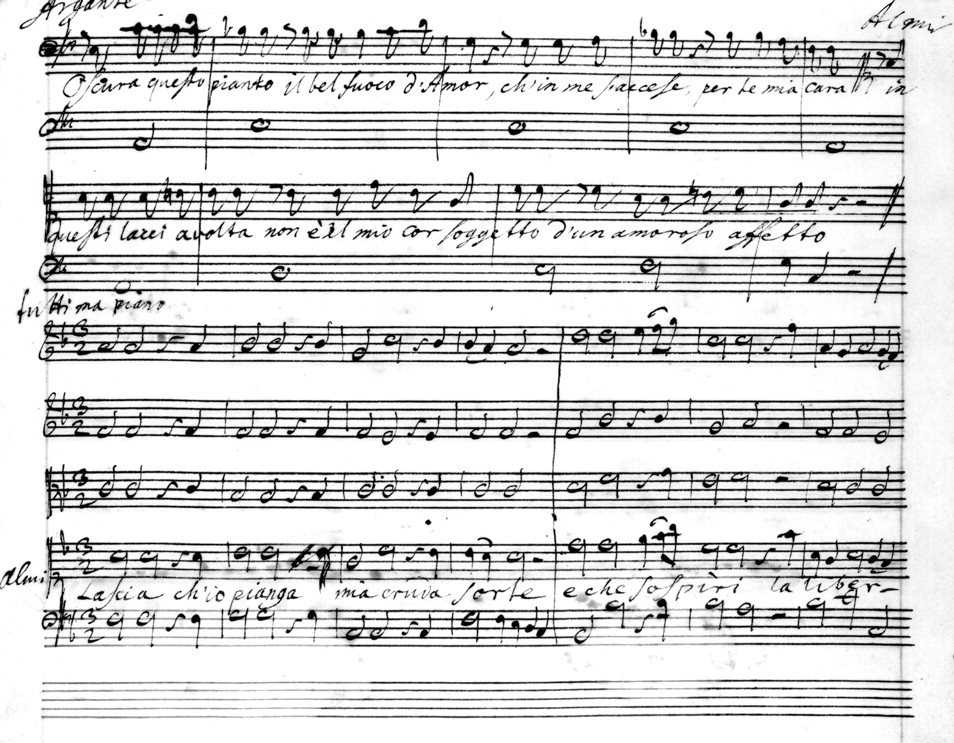
This score for Handel's Lascia ch'io pianga shows the simple accompaniment for a recitative; much of the time, the basso continuo (the lower staff in bass clef) play half notes and whole notes underneath the vocalist's recitative part.

A recitative from J.S. Bach's Cantata 140, "Wachet auf, ruft uns die Stimme"

Recitative (/ˌrɛsɪtəˈtiːv/, also known by its Italian name recitativo ([retʃitaˈtiːvo]), is a style of delivery (much used in operas, oratorios, and cantatas) in which a singer is allowed to adopt the rhythms and delivery of ordinary speech. Recitative does not repeat lines as formally composed songs or arias do. It resembles sung ordinary speech more than the vocal style typically encountered in fully developed compositions, consistent with the meaning of the English cognate for the Italian term "recitativo" ("a recitation").

Recitative can be distinguished on a continuum from more speech-like to more musically sung, with more sustained melodic lines. The mostly syllabic recitativo semplice ("simple recitative") of the 17th to early 19th centuries, now more commonly referred to among professional musicians as recitativo secco (Note: plural: recitativi secchi) ("dry", accompanied only by continuo, typically cello and harpsichord), is at one end of the spectrum, through recitativo accompagnato (which uses an orchestra to accompany the singer), the more melismatic arioso, and finally the full-blown aria or ensemble, in which the character of the vocal lines is entirely governed by the musical imagination of a composer. Secco recitatives can be more improvisatory in style for the singer (with a freer approach to rhythmic execution), since the accompaniment is so sparse; in contrast, when recitative is accompanied by orchestra, the singer must perform in a more structured way in order to coordinate precisely with the instrumentalists.

The term recitative (or occasionally liturgical recitative) is also applied to the simpler formulas of Gregorian chant, such as the tones used for the epistle, gospel, preface and collects; see accentus.

== Origins ==
The first use of recitative in opera was preceded by the monodies of the Florentine Camerata in which Vincenzo Galilei, father of the astronomer Galileo Galilei, played an important role. The elder Galilei, influenced by his correspondence with Girolamo Mei on the writings of the ancient Greeks and with Erycius Puteanus on the writings of Hucbald and wishing to recreate the old manner of storytelling and drama, pioneered the use of a single melodic line to tell the story, accompanied by simple chords from a harpsichord or lute.

In the Baroque era, recitatives were commonly rehearsed on their own by the stage director, the singers frequently supplying their own favourite baggage arias which might be by a different composer (some of Mozart's so-called concert arias fall into this category). This division of labour persisted into the 19th century: Rossini's La Cenerentola (1817, recitatives by Luca Agolini) is a famous example. Later it remained a custom to replace originally spoken dialogue with new recitatives: Carl Maria von Weber's Der Freischütz (1821, adapted 1841 with recitatives by Hector Berlioz for the Paris Opera), Georges Bizet's Carmen (1875, recitatives by Ernest Guiraud for the posthumous run in Vienna the same year), Charles Gounod's Mireille and La colombe (staged by Sergei Diaghilev with recitatives respectively by Eric Satie and Francis Poulenc).

== Secco ==
Secco recitatives, popularized in Florence though the proto-opera music dramas of Jacopo Peri and Giulio Caccini during the late 16th century, formed the substance of Claudio Monteverdi's operas during the 17th century, and continued to be used into the 19th century Romantic era by such composers as Gaetano Donizetti, reappearing in Stravinsky's The Rake's Progress. They also influenced areas of music outside opera.

In the early operas and cantatas of the Florentine school, secco recitatives were accompanied by a variety of instruments, mostly plucked fretted strings including the chitarrone, often with a pipe organ to provide sustained tone. Later, in the operas of Vivaldi and Handel, the accompaniment was standardised as a harpsichord and a bass viol or violoncello. For sacred works (especially oratorios) that included passages in the style of secco recitative, organ could be used instead of harpsichord throughout the 17th and 18th centuries. When the harpsichord was gradually phased out over the late 18th century, and mostly disappeared in the early 19th century, opera-houses generally replaced it in stages with the fortepiano, a hammered-string keyboard introduced in the late 17th century in Italy.

Eventually, the violoncello was left to carry on alone without a keyboard instrument, or with reinforcement from a double bass. A 1919 recording of Rossini's Barber of Seville, issued by La voce del padrone, gives a unique glimpse of this technique in action, as do cello methods of the period and some scores of Meyerbeer. There are examples of the revival of the harpsichord for this purpose as early as the 1890s (e.g. by Hans Richter for a production of Mozart's Don Giovanni at the London Royal Opera House, the instrument being supplied by Arnold Dolmetsch), but it was not until the 1950s that the 18th-century method was consistently observed once more. In the 2010s, the early music revival movement has led to the re-introduction of harpsichord in some Baroque performances.

== Accompagnato (or obbligato or stromentato) ==
Accompanied recitative, known as accompagnato or obbligato or stromentato, employs the orchestra as an accompanying body. The composer writes an arrangement for the orchestra musicians. As a result, it is less improvisational and declamatory than recitativo secco, and more song-like. This form is often employed where the orchestra can underscore a particularly dramatic text, as in "Thus saith the Lord" from Händel's Messiah; Joseph Haydn and Wolfgang Amadeus Mozart were also fond of it. A more inward intensification calls for an arioso, a term that indicates a more highly developed vocal style "like an aria" within a section of recitative; the opening of "Comfort ye" from the same work is a famous example, while the ending of it ("The voice of him that crieth in the wilderness") is secco.

Sometimes a distinction is made between the more dramatic, expressive, or interjecting 'orchestral recitative' (recitativo obbligato or stromentato) and a more passive and sustained 'accompanied recitative' (recitativo accompagnato).

== Post-Wagner uses ==
Later operas, under the influence of Richard Wagner, favored through-composition, where recitatives, arias, choruses and other elements were seamlessly interwoven into a whole. Many of Wagner's operas employ sections which are analogous to accompanied recitative.

Recitative is also occasionally used in musicals, being put to ironic use in the finale of Kurt Weill's The Threepenny Opera. It also appears in Carousel and Of Thee I Sing.

George Gershwin used it in his opera Porgy and Bess, though sometimes the recitative in that work is changed to spoken dialogue. Porgy and Bess has also been staged as a musical rather than as an opera.

== Instrumental recitative ==
Recitative has also sometimes been used to refer to parts of purely instrumental works which resemble vocal recitatives, in terms of their musical style. In an instrumental recitative, one instrument (or group of instruments) are given the melody line (akin to the role of the singer) and another instrument (or group of instruments) are given the accompaniment role. One of the earliest examples is found in the slow movement of Vivaldi's violin concerto in D, RV 208, which is marked "Recitative". C. P. E. Bach included instrumental recitative in his "Prussian" piano sonatas of 1742, composed at Frederick the Great's court in Berlin. In 1761, Joseph Haydn took his post at Esterhazy Palace and soon after composed his Symphony No. 7 ("Le Midi") in concertante style (i.e. with soloists). In the second movement of that work, the violinist is the soloist in an instrumental recitative.

Ludwig van Beethoven used the instrumental recitative in at least three works, including Piano Sonata No. 17 (The Tempest), Piano Sonata No. 31, and in the opening section of the Finale of his Ninth Symphony. Here, Beethoven inscribed on the score (in French) "In the manner of a recitative, but in tempo." Leon Plantinga argues that the second movement of Beethoven's Fourth Piano Concerto is also an instrumental recitative, although Owen Jander interprets it as a dialogue.

Other Romantic music era composers to employ instrumental recitative include Nikolai Rimsky-Korsakov (who composed a lyrical, virtuosic recitative for solo violin with harp accompaniment to represent the title character in his orchestral Scheherazade) and Hector Berlioz (whose choral symphony Roméo et Juliette contains a trombone recitative as part of its Introduction).

Arnold Schoenberg labeled the last of his Five Pieces for Orchestra, Op. 16, as "Das obligate Rezitativ", and also composed a piece for organ, Variations on a Recitative, Op. 40. Other examples of instrumental recitative in twentieth century music include the third movement of Douglas Moore's Quintet for Clarinet and Strings (1946), the first of Richard Rodney Bennett's Five Impromptus for guitar (1968), the opening section of the last movement of Benjamin Britten's String Quartet No. 3 (1975), and the second of William Bolcom's 12 New Etudes for Piano (1977–86).

== The tropes of recitative ==
There are certain conventions, or tropes, which standardize recitative; so that, in practice, recitative is a rigid musical form. The following are standard tropes of recitative:

- Recitative is a dialogue between a (usually) solo voice and an instrument or instruments. Usually the voice and instrument(s) alternate, or share a chord while one continues. In this way the speech-like rhythm of the singer does not need to be coordinated and synchronized with the instrument(s).
- Recitative cadences: The dialog ends with the instruments. Invariably the instrument(s) complete the final dominant-tonic cadence. Also, typically the voice stops on or before the dominant chord and then the instrument(s) execute a return to the tonic. Occasionally the subdominant-tonic (plagal) cadence is used instead.
- Recitative chord progressions: The chord progressions in recitative avoid resolutions and rely heavily on dominant sevenths and diminished chords to postpone the resolution. In the extreme, the instrument(s) start the dialog with a diminished chord, moving from non-resolution to non-resolution, building up to a temporary or final cadence, as described above.
- Trope violations: the transition between recitative and aria, and subtle violations on the above 'tropes' are what make some recitatives more creative than others. For example, Bach's use of a plagal cadence; sometimes more than one voice is used [Haydn's Creation, 31]; and sometimes a deceptive cadence replaces the dominant-tonic cadence, as a way of appending a new section.

== See also ==
- Melodrama or accompanied speech
- Sprechgesang 'speech-song', with rhythms and approximate pitches musically notated
- "Recitatif", Toni Morrison's short story formatted after a recitative
- Spoken word
