= In memoriam (Moore) =

Symphonic poem by Douglas Moore

In memoriam is a symphonic poem by the American composer Douglas Moore.

Moore wrote In memoriam in 1943 in memory of the young soldiers who died in World War II. It is Moore's darkest work and contrasts strongly with the ebullient Symphony in A major, which was written two years later. Most of the music is very elegiac as befits the piece.

The premiere was given by Howard Hanson in early 1944.
