= Gallantry (opera) =

Opera by Douglas Moore

- Opera by Douglas Moore
- Librettist: Arnold Sundgaard
- Language: English
- Premiere: March 19, 1958; Brander Matthews Theater, Colorado

Gallantry is a one-act opera by composer Douglas Moore. The work is a parody of soap opera, complete with sung commercial interruptions. The work uses an English-language libretto by Arnold Sundgaard.

== History ==
The opera premiered in a double bill with Dominick Argento's The Boor on March 19, 1958, in New York City at the former Brander Matthews Theater on 117th Street, located between Amsterdam Avenue and Morningside Drive. It was produced by Columbia University School of Music with a student cast. It has been staged over more than forty years by other university opera programs in the United States and Canada.

The first professional opera company to stage Gallantry was the Detroit Opera, which presented the work in a double bill with Gian Carlo Menotti's The Medium in January 1962. Gallantry was adapted by Moore for television and was broadcast by CBS on August 30, 1962, in a program which also included a presentation of Wallingford Riegger's ballet Parallels. The production was produced by Pamela Illott, directed by Martin Carr, hosted by Jan Peerce, and featured the CBS Symphony Orchestra. It starred Laurel Hurley as the Nurse, Ron Holgate as the Surgeon, Charles Anthony as the Patient, and Martha Wright as the Announcer. The opera was staged at the 1967 Florida International Music Festival in Daytona Beach with Metropolitan Opera performers Carol Courtman, Julian Patrick, and Enrico Di Giuseppe. The opera was subsequently staged by the Canadian Opera Company (1977) and the Lake George Opera (1986). Since the late 20th century, the opera has been performed by several chamber opera ensembles, with productions being staged by the American Chamber Opera Company (1988), A Small Company In America (1990), the New York Chamber Ensemble (1991), and Pocket Opera (2000).

== Roles ==
| Role | Voice type | Premiere Cast, March 19, 1958 (Conductor: – Emerson Buckley) |
|---|---|---|
| Announcer | mezzo-soprano | Cecilia Ward |
| Lola Markham, a nurse | soprano | Bonnie Murray |
| Donald Hopewell, a patient | tenor | Joseph Sopher |
| Doctor Gregg | baritone | David Atkinson |

== Discography ==
- New York Chamber Ensemble/Radcliffe Happy Endings: Comic Chamber Operas CD / Albany 173 (1995)

== Productions ==
The work has been staged for more than 40 years by numerous university opera theatre programs in the United States and Canada, including UCLA (1958, 1974, and 1994), Immaculate Heart College (1968), Goucher College (1969), the University of Michigan (1978), the University of Toronto (1988), San Diego State University (1989), Pepperdine University (1990), Wilfrid Laurier University (1992), the University of Arizona (1995), George Washington University (1999), the University of Wisconsin (2003) and Houghton College (2019) among others. The University of Southern California toured the opera to the Netherlands in 1968.
