= Symphony No. 2 (Moore) =

Symphony (1946) by Douglas Moore

Symphony No. 2 in A major is a classical composition by American composer Douglas Moore. It was composed in 1945 and received its premiere in Paris on May 5, 1946, conducted by Robert Lawrence. In the following year the American premiere was given in Los Angeles, Alfred Wallenstein conducting.

The symphony is Moore's second essay in that form and is dedicated to the memory of Stephen Vincent Benét, who supplied the libretto for Moore's opera The Devil and Daniel Webster. A work of moderate length and a classical conception inspired by Haydn, it represents Moore's fully formed mature style and is unarguably one of his best pieces. Moore himself described it as: "an attempt to write in clear, objective, modified classical style, with emphasis on rhythmic and melodic momentum rather than upon sharply contrasted themes or dramatic climaxes".

It is in four movements, three of which end in a quiet manner. The symphony lasts approximately twenty minutes.

== Movements ==
There are four movements:

1. Andante con moto – Allegro giusto
2. Andante quieto semplice
3. Allegretto
4. Allegro con spirito

The first movement starts with a solemnly lyric and wistful theme given out by trumpet, oboe and strings, which is carried out through the first section in a somewhat nostalgic fashion. The calmness is later abandoned in favour of a more lilting and dancelike mood on strings, which moves along in a processional way before a crescendo leads to the short coda ending the movement in silence. This movement features significantly more use of percussion, xylophone and triangle, than the other three.

While the symphony as a whole is not in any way programmatic, the second movement was in part inspired by a James Joyce poem concerning twilight music. This is understandable, as most of the music is nocturnal save for a few passionate outbursts which may relate to the work In Memoriam from a few years earlier. It is clearly indicative of Moore's ability to write sensitive and heartfelt music.

The third movement is the shortest and most jovial and most obviously neoclassical of all the movements. It starts with a happy and bubbling theme on woodwinds which forms the basis of the whole movement. In the more animated middle section (where the woodwind indulges in some trilling baroquery) a second theme on trumpet is countered by the main theme in a delightfully contrapuntal way before winding down into stillness.

The beginning of the last movement is proclaimed, in a declamatory fashion, on brass only to introduce the robust and energetic main theme that persists throughout. Following the introduction the orchestra leads into a rondo-like section with alternatingly rousing and flowing treatments, where the main theme dominates. After several louder expositions the main theme is played out faster on strings building up a heroic atmosphere and leading to a bursting crescendo of kinetic energy after which a drumroll leads the movement to the spirited closing diminuendo.
