= Norwegian-American Historical Association =

American history society

Norwegian American Historical Association
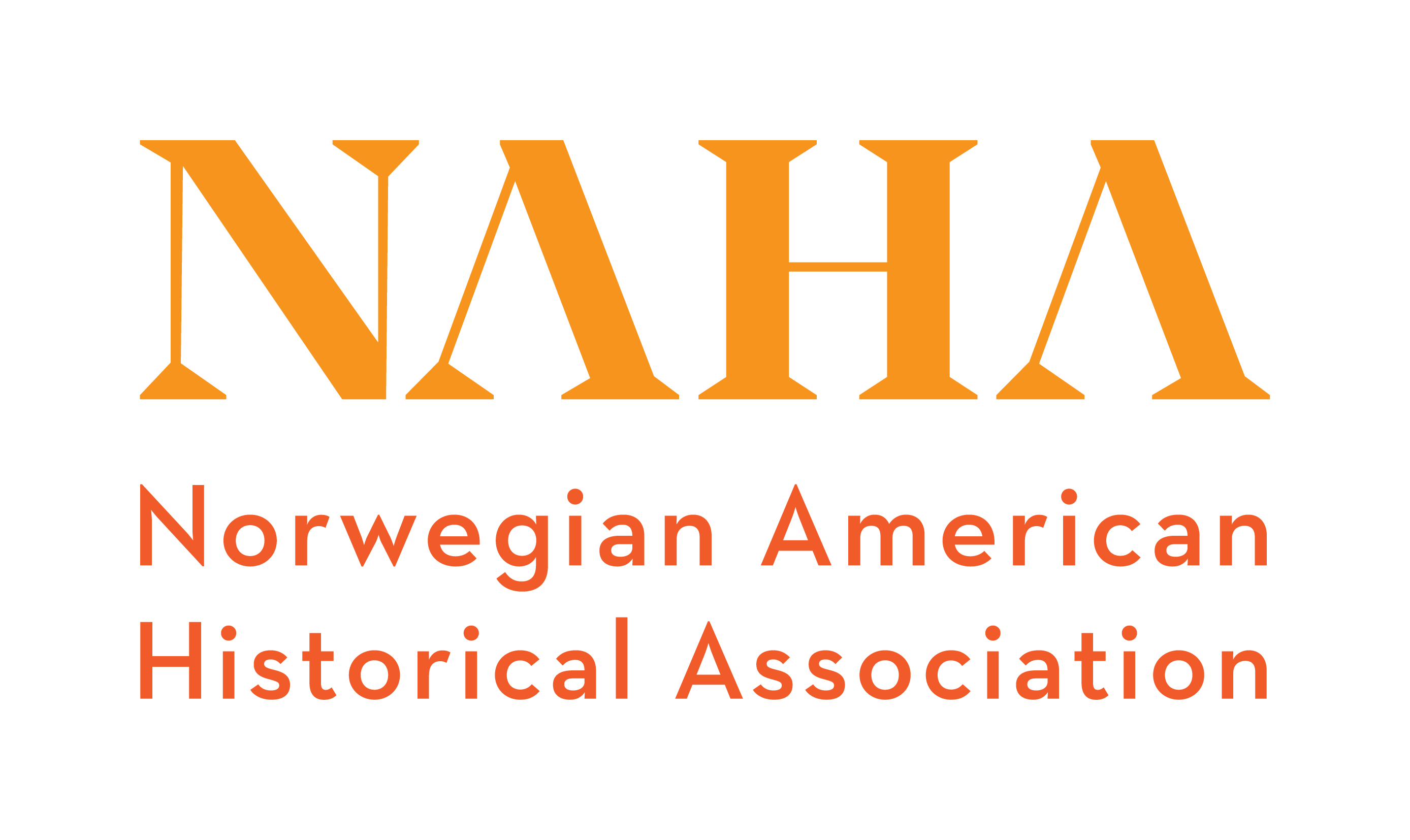
- Abbreviation: NAHA
- Formation: October 6, 1925
- Founded at: Northfield, Minnesota
- Type: Non-profit
- Purpose: "To inspire connections to Norwegian-American experiences through discovery, scholarship, and stewardship"
- Location: Northfield, Minnesota
- Website: norwegianamericanhistory.org

Norwegian American Historical Association is a non-profit, member-supported organization dedicated to locating, collecting, preserving and interpreting the Norwegian-American experience. It publishes scholarly books and maintains a historical archive, documenting research and interpretations of the American experience of immigrants from Norway.

== History ==
The first meeting of the Norwegian American Historical Association took place on October 6, 1925, in Northfield, Minnesota. By February 4, 1926, the Norwegian American Historical Association was incorporated by the State of Minnesota. Since its founding, the independent non-profit organization has been located on the campus of St. Olaf College, in Northfield, Minnesota. Both institutions are independent entities.

The first executive board consisted of:

- D.G. Ristad, president
- Laurence M. Larson, vice-president
- O.E. Rølvaag, secretary and archivist
- O.M. Oleson, treasurer
- Birger Osland, assistant treasurer
- A.C. Floan
- Knut Gjerset
- Kristian Prestgard
- Theodore C. Blegen, editor

== Publications ==
Its Norwegian-American Studies (formerly Studies and Records) publications are available online. The current editor of NAHA's publications is Anna Peterson.

== Archives ==
Ole E. Rolvaag, the author of Giants in the Earth, became the association's first secretary and archivist. Rølvaag initiated the collection of archives including letters, papers, books, periodicals, photographs, diaries and newspapers related to Norwegian-American life.
