= Giants in the Earth (opera) =

Opera by Douglas Moore

- Opera by Douglas Moore
- Librettist: Arnold Sundgaard
- Language: English
- Based on: Ole Edvart Rølvaag's Giants in the Earth
- Premiere: March 28, 1951; Columbia University, New York City

Giants in the Earth is a 1951 Pulitzer Prize-winning opera in three acts and four scenes by composer Douglas Moore. The work uses an English libretto by Arnold Sundgaard after Ole Edvart Rølvaag's 1924-5 novel of the same name. The idea for the opera was originally conceived by Sundgaard, and depicts a story of tragedy and romance among Norwegian American settlers of Dakota Territory in 1873. Composed during 1948-1949, the work was premiered on March 28, 1951 at Columbia University's Brander Matthews Theatre by the Columbia Opera Workshop.

The Pulitzer jury concluded: "In no opera by an American is there music of such freshness, beauty, and distinctive character. The music has a life of its own apart from its appositeness to the text... Subject, text, and music avoid the cliché and commonplace and combine for an impression of strength and sincerity." Moore's compositional style is highly vocal and features a speech-like, through-composed, "lack of melodic repetition," with a, "fluidity and natural feel [to] the vocal lines." Contrastingly, the lack of character development and liveliness, the almost complete lack of attention grabbing motifs, the length, and the premiere performance have all been criticized. Olin Downes of The New York Times wrote that the opera was mostly, "recitative of little inherent significance."

The premiere cast included soprano Brenda Miller Cooper as the central figure Beret, along with Josh Wheeler, Roy Johnson, Vivian Bauer, Sam Bertsche, Helen Dautrich, James Cosenza, Frances Paige, Raymond Sharp, and Edward Black. In 1963 Moore improved the orchestration and depiction of Beret at the request of Carl Fischer Music.

The runners up for the Pulitzer that year were Quincy Porter's String Quartet No. 8, Peter Mennin's Symphony No. 5, and David Diamond's Symphony No. 3.

Despite its acclaim, in the decades since first being written Giants in the Earth has scarcely been performed live. Following a major donation from Dean and Rosemarie Buntrock, the South Dakota Symphony Orchestra produced the opera in Sioux Falls in 2025. It was recorded for commercial release in association with Pentatone Records.

== Roles ==
Role	Voice type	Premiere Cast, 28 March 1951 conductor Willard Rhodes
Per Hansa	Baritone	Josh Wheeler
Beret, his wife	Soprano	Brenda Miller Cooper
Hans Olsa	Bass-Baritone	Roy Johnson
Sorrine, his wife	Contralto	Viviane Bauer
Syvert Tonetsen	Tenor	Samuel Bertsche
Kjersti, his wife	Soprano	Helen Dautrich
Henry	Tenor	James Cosenza
Dagmar	Soprano	Frances Paige
A Preacher	Baritone	Raymond Sharp
O'Hara	Bass	Edward Block
Sullivan		Roger Farrand
Ola & Anna, Children of Per and Beret		Donald Stammer, Ellen Spencer
Dancers at the wedding		

== Synopsis ==
=== Act 1 ===
The crest of a low hill, early morning in Spring.

=== Act 2 ===
Interior of the sod hut of Per Hansa, a June afternoon.

=== Act 3 ===
Scene 1, Outside the hut. A Sunday morning in September. Scene 2, Interior of the hut. Late at night in February.
