= Quintet for clarinet and strings (Moore) =

1946 composition by Douglas Moore

Quintet for clarinet and strings is a piece of chamber music by the American composer Douglas Moore.

== Background ==
In 1946, the Juilliard School of Music requested from Moore a chamber piece to be performed at a school concert the following year. He worked at and finished the piece during the summer of 1946 at his home in Cutchogue. The premiere was given the following year. It was first performed on May 6, 1947 by the Juilliard String Quartet, Harry Noble soloist.

== Music ==
The work is in traditional sonata form and consists of four movements

1. Allegro risoluto
2. Andante comodo
3. Adagio recitativo
4. Allegro ritmico

The first movement is the most dynamic and is chiefly dominated by a tensely rhythmic figure achieved by a triplet laid over a duplet. This duality of rhythm becomes most obvious when the two components are handled by different instruments, but the combination and tension that is achieved gives this movement its impetus

The second movement is considerably relaxed in mood and is introduced by a melodic figure on violin which becomes the contrapuntal background to the main theme, first given by clarinet. The theme subsequently continues throughout the piece.

The third movement is the shortest movement of the quintet, it commences with a brooding soliloquy on clarinet accompanied by the viola which is the picked up by the remaining strings and is allowed to fade out.

The finale consists of a robust, dancing and peasant-like refrain of shifting rhythm which alternates in the fashion of a rondo with contrasting material. It is the quintet's most joyful movement.

== Reception ==
The clarinet quintet was quite favourably received upon its first performance and the New York Herald Tribune praised its: "Spontaneous lyricism, expert craftmanship and utter freedom from stylistic mannerisms". It is Moore's most famous and popular chamber piece and has received (as of 2006) at least two commercial recordings.
