= Ole Edvart Rølvaag =

Norwegian-American novelist

Ole Edvart Rølvåg
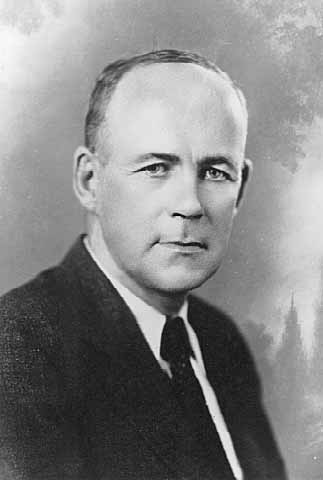
- 1920s (?), Minnesota Historical Society
- Born: 22 April 1876; Dønna Municipality, Norway
- Died: 5 November 1931 (aged 55); Northfield, Minnesota, United States
- Occupations: Novelist and professor
- Known for: Giants in the Earth

Ole Edvart Rølvaag (Urban East Norwegian: [ˈûːlə ˈɛ̀dːvɑʈ ˈrø̂ːlvoːɡ]; Rølvåg in modern Norwegian, Rolvaag in English orthography) (April 22, 1876 – November 5, 1931) was a Norwegian-American novelist and professor who became well known for his writings regarding the Norwegian American immigrant experience. Ole Rolvaag is most cited for Giants in the Earth, an epic novel of Norwegian immigrant homesteaders in the Dakota Territory.

== Biography ==
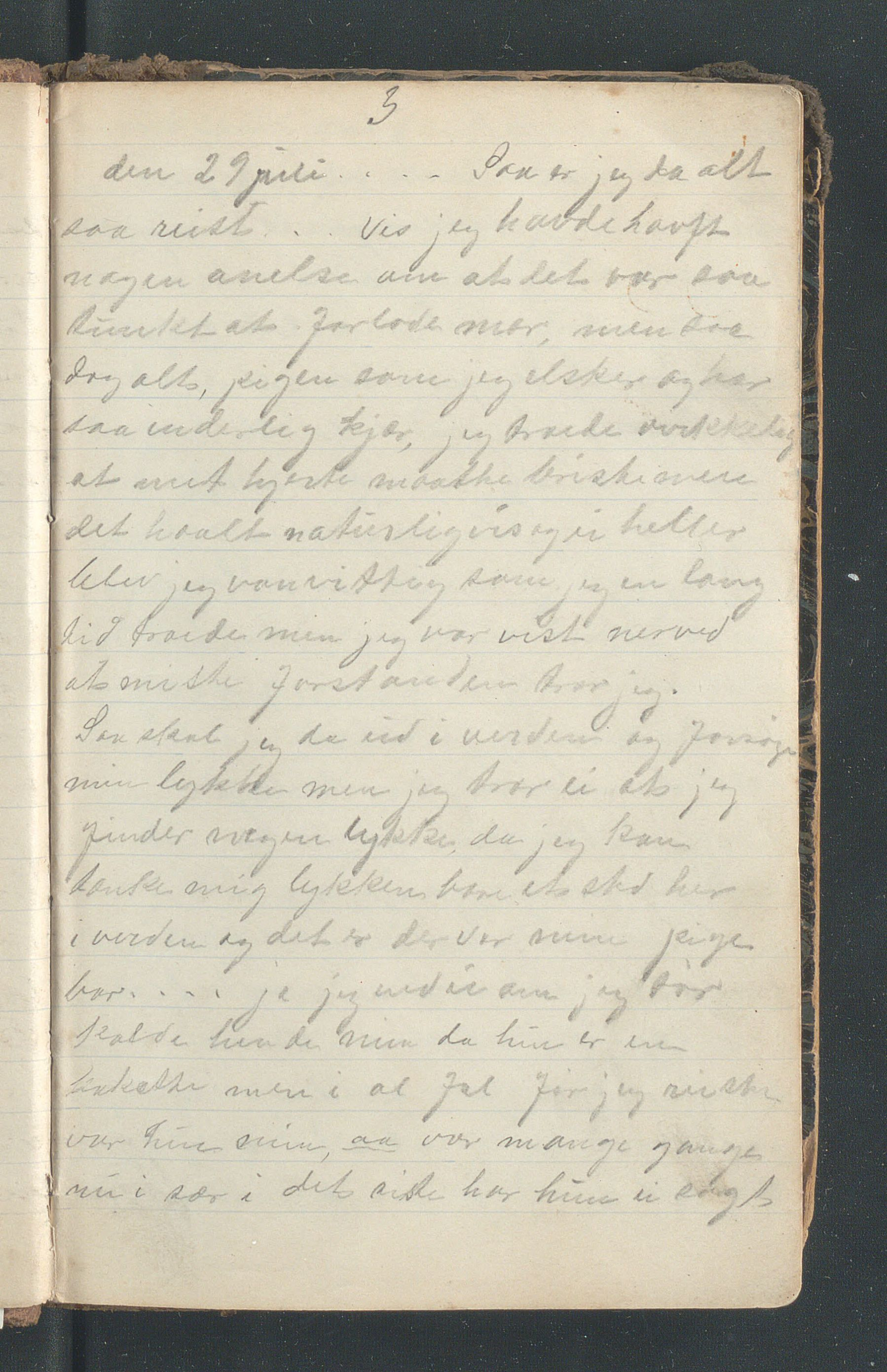
O.E. Rølvaag's 1896 immigration diary from Dønna, Norway to the United States. In this diary, he discusses his journey to Elk Point, South Dakota.

At 14 years of age Rølvaag joined his father and brothers in the Lofoten fishing grounds.

He was sent a ticket to America in 1896 from an uncle who had emigrated earlier. He traveled to Union County, South Dakota, to work as a farmhand. He settled in Elk Point, South Dakota, working as a farmhand until 1898. With the help of his pastor, Rølvaag enrolled in Augustana Academy in Canton, South Dakota, where he graduated in 1901. He earned a bachelor's degree from St. Olaf College in Northfield, Minnesota, in 1905, and a master's degree from the same institution in 1910. He also had studied for some time at the University of Oslo.

== Personal life ==
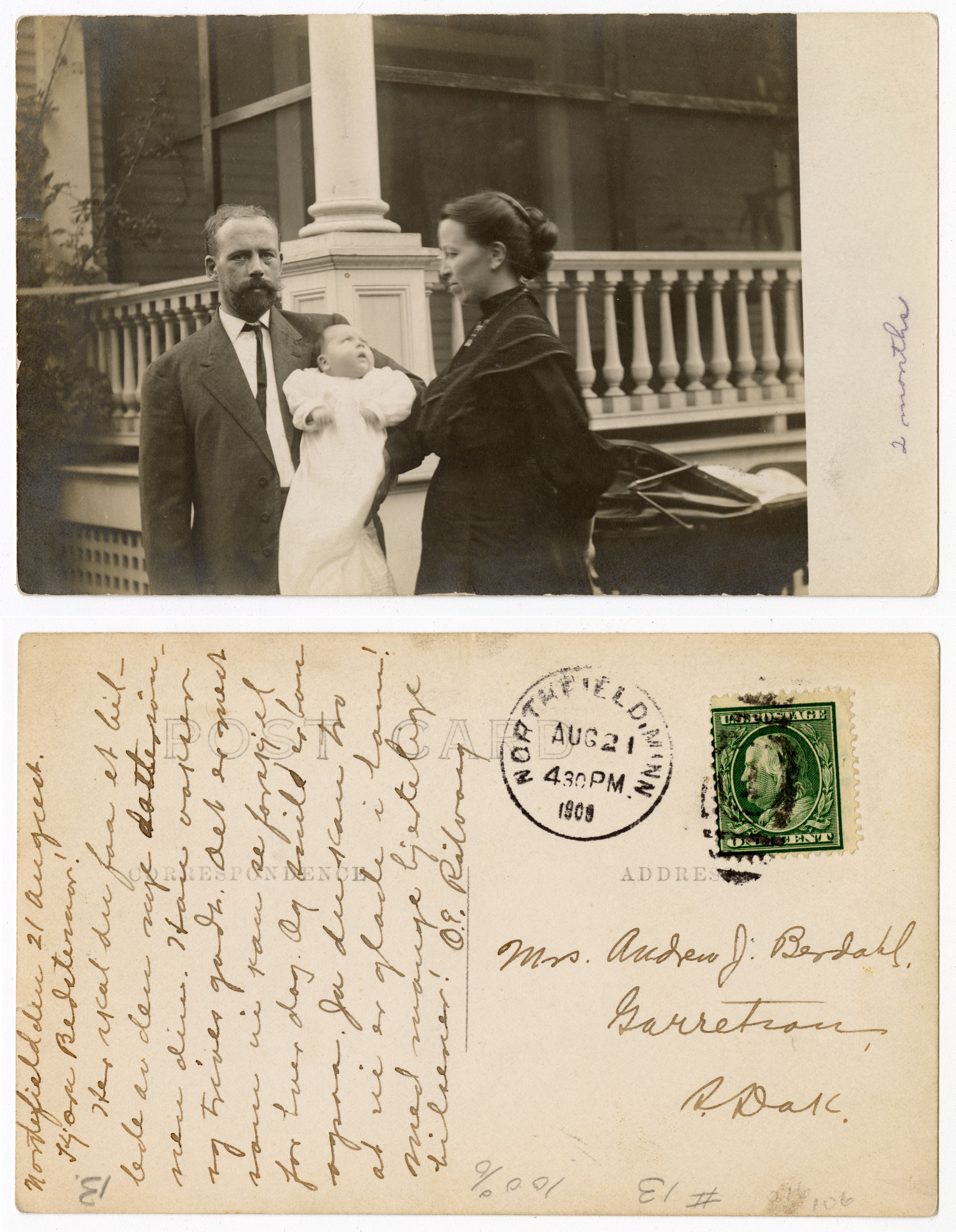
Ole and Jennie Rølvaag with their son, Olaf.

In 1908, Rølvaag became a United States citizen and married Jennie Marie Berdahl, the daughter of Andrew James Berdahl and Karen Oline Otterness. They had four children: Olaf, Ella, Karl and Paul. Their son, Karl Fritjof Rolvaag, served as the 31st governor of Minnesota. Ole Rolvaag died November 5, 1931, in Northfield, Minnesota.

== Giants in the Earth ==
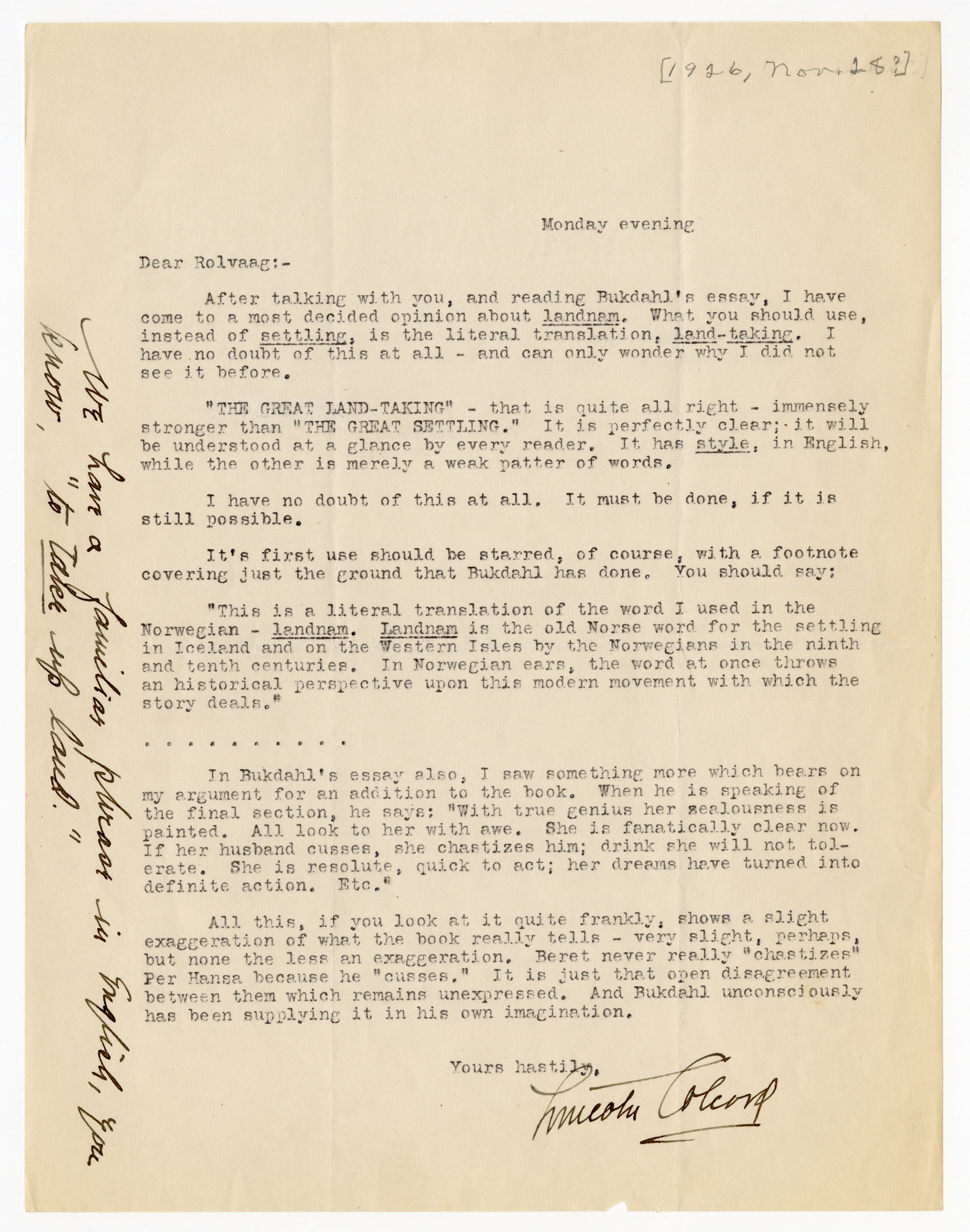
Letter from Lincoln Colcord to O.E. Rølvaag discussing the translation of Giants in the Earth.

Rølvaag's authorship and scholarship focused on the pioneer experience on the Dakota plains in the 1870s. His most famous book was Giants in the Earth, part of a trilogy. The novel realistically treats the lives and trials of Norwegian pioneers in the Midwest, emphasizing their battles with the elements. The book also portrays the trials of loneliness, separation from family, longing for the old country, and the difficulty of fitting into a new culture.

Giants in the Earth served as the basis for an opera by Douglas Moore and Arnold Sundgaard that won the Pulitzer Prize for Music in 1951.

== Honors and awards ==
Rølvaag was appointed Knight of the Order of St Olav by King Haakon VII in 1926. Also, St. Olaf College has created a literary award named for Rolvaag, the Ole E. Rolvaag Award for Fiction, the "award honors the memory of St. Olaf’s greatest writer, Ole Rolvaag".

== Memorials ==
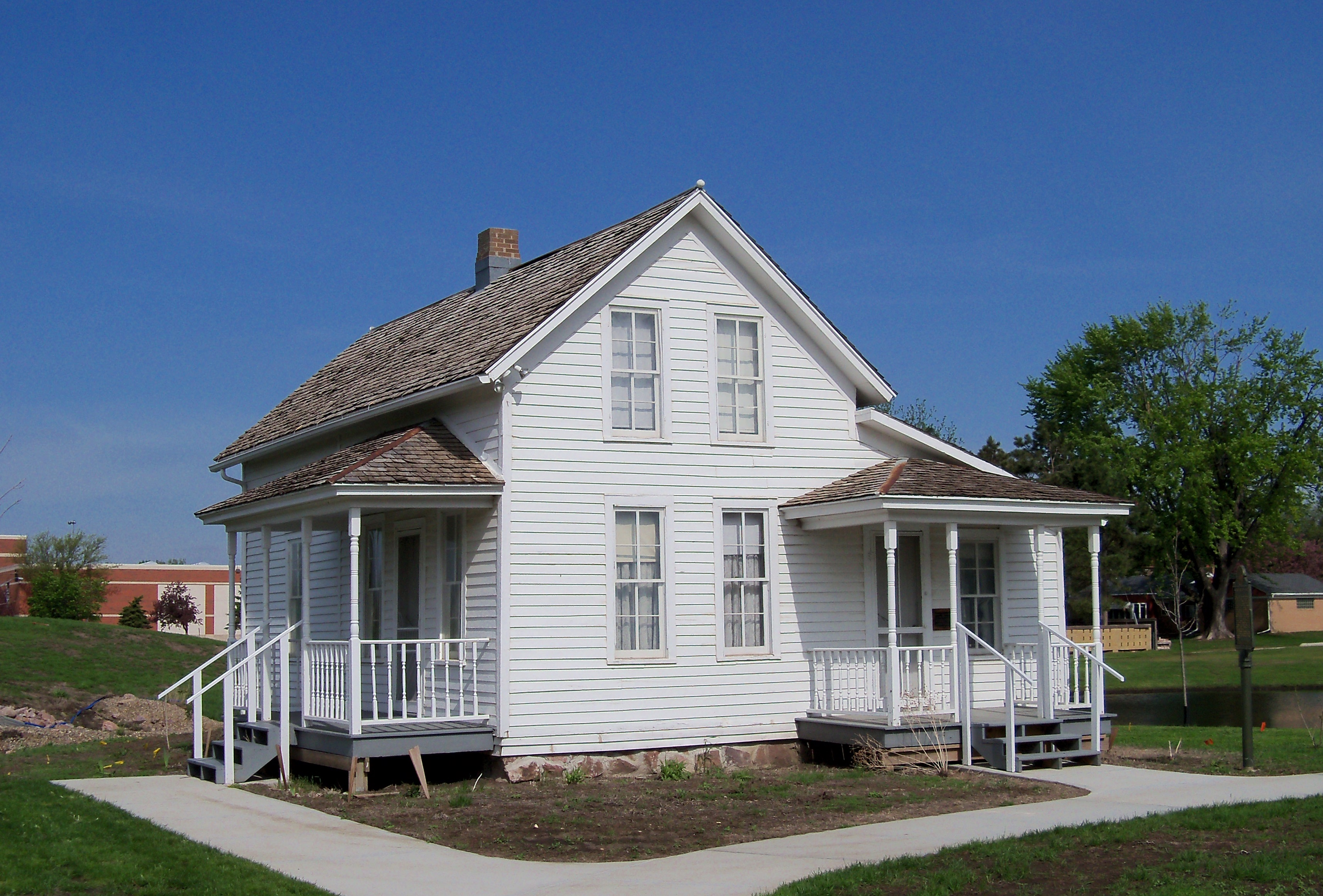
Berdahl–Rølvaag House in Sioux Falls, South Dakota, where he wrote Giants in the Earth

- The O. E. Rolvaag House in Northfield, Minnesota, is listed as a National Historic Landmark.
- Rolvaag Memorial Library at St. Olaf College is named in honor of O. E. Rolvaag.
- Berdahl–Rølvaag House, where Rølvaag wrote Giants in the Earth, is located in the Heritage Park of the Augustana University campus in Sioux Falls, South Dakota.
- The Ole Rolvaag Collection is maintained in the Norwegian-American Historical Association Archives.

== Selected bibliography ==
- Amerika-breve fra P.A. Smevik til hans far og bror i Norge – American Letters (1912)
- Paa Glemte Veie – On Forgotten Paths (1914)
- To Tullinger: Et Billede frå idag – Two Fools: A Portrait of Our Times (1920)
- Længselens Baat – The Boat of Longing (1921)
- Omkring fædrearven – Concerning Our Heritage (1922)
- I de Dage – In Those Days (1923)
- Riket Grundlægges – Founding the Kingdom (1924)

The following three books form a trilogy:

- Giants in the Earth (combined version of I de Dage and Riket Grundlægges – translated and published in 1927)
- Peder Seier – Peder Victorious (translated in 1929)
- Den Signede Dag – Their Father's God (translated in 1931)

Last release:

- Pure Gold (translated in 1930)
- The Boat of Longing (1933)

== Additional sources ==
- Jorgenson, Theodore and Solum, Nora O. Ole Edvart Rölvaag: A Biography (Harper and Brothers, 1939)
- Reigstad, Paul. Rolvaag: His Life and Art (University of Nebraska Press, 1972)
- Thorson, Gerald. Ole Rolvaag, Artist and Cultural Leader (St. Olaf College Press, 1975)
- Simonson, Harold P. Prairies Within: The Tragic Trilogy of Ole Rolvaag (University of Washington Press, 1987)
- Moseley, Ann. Ole Edvart Rolvaag (Boise State University Bookstore, 1987)
- Eckstein, Neil Truman. Marginal Man As Novelist: The Norwegian-American Writers H.H Boyesen and O.E. Rolvaag (Taylor & Francis, 1990)
- Haugen, Einar Ingvald Ole Edvart Rölvaag (Boston: Twayne Publishers,1983)
- Moose, Nancy Gwen, Religion, Women and Culture in the Works of Ole E. Rølvaag. (1989). Electronic Theses and Dissertations. South Dakota State University. https://openprairie.sdstate.edu/etd/4610
- Zempel, Solveig. 1999. Ole Edvart Rolvaag: Novelist. St. Olaf and the Vocation of a Church College, Pamela Schwandt, Gary De Krey, and L. DeAne Lagerquist, eds. pp. 89–96. Northfield, MN: St. Olaf College.
