= Giants in the Earth (novel) =

1920s novel by Ole Edvart Rølvaag

- Cover of first English edition of Giants in the Earth
- Author: Ole Edvart Rølvaag
- Language: Norwegian
- Genre: Novel
- Published: 1924–1925
- Publisher: Aschehoug
- Publication place: Norway
- Followed by: Peder Seier

Giants in the Earth (Norwegian: I de dage) is a novel by Norwegian-American author Ole Edvart Rølvaag. First published in Norwegian in two volumes in 1924 and 1925, it was published in English in 1927, translated by Rølvaag and author Lincoln Colcord (1883–1947).

== Overview ==
The novel follows a pioneer Norwegian immigrant family's struggles with the land and the elements of the Dakota Territory as they try to make a new life in America. In 1873, Per Hansa, his wife Beret and their children settle in the Dakota Territory. They are joined by three other Norwegian immigrant families—Tonseten and his wife Kjersti, Hans Olsa and his wife Sorine, and the Solum brothers.

Part of a trilogy, it had two sequels: Peder Victorious (Peder Seier) in 1928 and Their Fathers' God (Den signede dag) in 1931. The books were based partly on Rølvaag's personal experiences as a settler as well as the experiences of his wife's family who had been immigrant homesteaders in South Dakota. The novels depict snow storms, locusts, poverty, hunger, loneliness, homesickness, the difficulty of fitting into a new culture, and the estrangement of immigrant children who grow up in a new land.

Giants in the Earth was turned into an opera of the same name by Douglas Moore and Arnold Sundgaard; it won the Pulitzer Prize for Music in 1951.

The novel has been known and appreciated internationally. Nuruddin Farah, a Somali novelist, has written a novel about Somali refugees living in Norway, where the husband is translating Giants in the Earth into Somali. Rølvaag's work has also been the topic of an article by a Romanian scholar, as well as part of her doctoral dissertation.
