= Douglas Moore =

American composer (1893–1969)

Douglas Moore

Douglas Stuart Moore (August 10, 1893 – July 25, 1969) was an American composer, songwriter, organist, pianist, conductor, educator, actor, and author. A composer who mainly wrote works with an American subject, his music is generally characterized by lyricism in a popular or conservative style which generally eschewed the more experimental progressive trends of musical modernism. Composer Virgil Thomson described Moore as a neoromantic composer who was influenced by American folk music. While several of his works enjoyed popularity during his lifetime, only his folk opera The Ballad of Baby Doe (1956) has remained well known into the 21st century.

Moore first created music while a student at Yale University from 1911 through 1917. He served as an officer in the United States Navy during World War I before pursuing graduate studies in music composition with Vincent d'Indy at the Schola Cantorum de Paris (1919–1921) and with Ernest Bloch at the Cleveland Institute of Music (1921–1922). Moore began his professional life as the organist and music director for the Cleveland Museum of Art (CMA) from 1921 through 1925, during which time he also worked professionally as a leading actor with the Cleveland Play House. His first composition of note, Four Museum Pieces, was originally written for organ in 1922. The piece won him a competitive Joseph Pulitzer National Traveling Scholarship which funded further composition studies with Nadia Boulanger in Paris in 1926.

In the fall of 1926 Moore joined the music faculty of Barnard College at Columbia University. He was rapidly promoted at Columbia from adjunct faculty to professor and head of the music department at Barnard College in 1927, thanks in large part to the success of his orchestral suite The Pageant of P.T. Barnum (composed 1924, premiered 1926). Moore was director of the Columbia University orchestra from 1926 through 1935. In 1940 he succeeded Daniel Gregory Mason as chair of the music program at Columbia, a post he held until his retirement in 1962. His roles at Columbia and the MacDowell Colony as well as leadership roles on the governing boards of the American Society of Composers, Authors and Publishers and the American Academy of Arts and Letters made Moore one of the more influential music educators of the mid 20th century.

Moore composed music for the theater, film, ballet and orchestra. During his lifetime he was primarily known for his folk operas, beginning with the children's opera The Headless Horseman (1936). His next folk opera to achieve success was The Devil and Daniel Webster which premiered on Broadway in 1939 and was based on the 1936 short story of the same name by Pulitzer Prize winning poet Stephen Vincent Benét. Moore was awarded the Pulitzer Prize for Music for the opera Giants in the Earth in 1951. His best known work, The Ballad of Baby Doe, premiered at the Central City Opera in 1956 and received a critically lauded production at the New York City Opera (NYCO) in 1958. The NYCO recorded the opera with Beverly Sills in the title role. It has remained a part of the standard opera repertory. As an author he penned two books on music, Listening to Music (1932) and From Madrigal to Modern Music (1942).

== Life ==
=== Early life (1893–1911) ===
Douglas Stuart Moore was born on August 10, 1893, in Cutchogue, New York, in the farmhouse of his grandfather, Joseph Hull Moore, where both his father and brothers were also born. He was the youngest child of Stuart Hull Moore and Myra Drake, both of whom descended from the first colonial English settlers to America. He had two older brothers, Arthur and Eliot, and an older sister, Dorothy. His father built another nearby home for his family on the Moore family's farm, named Quawksnest, in which Moore and his family spent their summers. As an adult Moore lived on the family's Cutchogue property until his death in 1969. He resided in a cottage named Salt Meadow which was originally a garage and clubhouse before being converted into a home for Moore in 1933.

Moore's father made a living as a publisher of among other things the literary magazine Ladies' World, a business which he sold to S. S. McClure upon his retirement in 1913. While not in Cutchogue, the Moore family resided in Brooklyn, New York, at a house located at 43 McDonough Street until 1914 when the family moved into a Brooklyn apartment building at the corner of Van Buren Street and Sumner Avenue. The family also owned a summer home in Pasadena, California which was purchased after Stuart Moore sold his business. While there were no professional musicians in Moore's family, his mother was an amateur pianist who also sang in the women's chorus of Brooklyn's Chaminade Society (CS). At his mother's insistence, Moore began his music education at the age of seven with the conductor of the CS chorus, Emma Richardson Kuster, who began giving him piano lessons in 1900. He later was a piano student of Beverly Day. His father enjoyed playing pianola rolls in the family home during his youth.

Moore attended elementary school at the Adelphi Academy (now Adelphi University) in Brooklyn which was operated at that time by Charles Herbert Levermore. At the age of 13 he matriculated to the Fessenden School, a boys boarding school in West Newton, Massachusetts which he attended for the 1906–1907 academic year. After this, he completed the last four years of his college preparatory education at the Hotchkiss School in Lakeville, Connecticut from which he graduated in the spring of 1911. At Hotchkiss he made close friendships with several fellow students that would last through adulthood. These included friendships with Archibald MacLeish, who became a three-time Pulitzer Prize-winning poet, writer, and the ninth Librarian of Congress; Donald Oenslager, who became a Tony Award winning scenic designer; Henry Luce, who founded the magazines Time, Life, and Fortune; and Emily Bailey, whom Moore eventually married in 1920.

=== Yale University (1911–1917) ===
Moore entered Yale University as a college freshman in the fall of 1911 alongside his Hotchkiss friend Archibald MacLeish. At Yale he composed songs for school events which demonstrated a talent for writing music within a popular style. He quickly gained a reputation at Yale for writing humorous songs, one of which, "Naomi: The Restaurant Queen", was performed by actress Ethel Green in her vaudeville act and was published by Charles F. Smith in 1912. Of the other songs he wrote while at Yale, the most well known is the Yale fight song "Goodnight, Harvard" which he composed in 1913. This song has been recorded by several artists, including Rudy Vallée. He also wrote another fight song, "Parabalou", in 1912.

Moore was a member of the Yale Glee Club from 1913 through 1915, succeeding Cole Porter as the ensemble's "soloist and stunt man". With the glee club he often starred in comedy acts that contained music that he had composed. He was also a member of the banjo and mandolin club, and notably composed Concerto for Piano and mandolins which he premiered on campus as the pianist. In May 1914 he became a member of the Wolf's Head secret society. He also performed in stage plays with the Yale Dramatic Association and the Elizabethan Club. Yale being an all-male school at that time, he often portrayed female characters on stage in drag, such as Mabel Chilters in Oscar Wilde's An Ideal Husband. Moore developed close friendships with several fellow students in these performance groups, including Stephen Vincent Benét, Thornton Wilder, and Cole Porter.

Originally a philosophy major, Moore didn't begin formal music studies at Yale until the fall 1913 semester when he became a pupil of David Stanley Smith who was one of his principal music teachers at Yale. His other principal teacher at Yale was Horatio Parker, who encouraged Moore to focus his music studies on composition after Parker heard works composed by Moore for the Yale Dramatic Club's productions of Walter Scott's Quentin Durward and William Shakespeare's King Lear in 1914. For those productions Moore served as conductor. He earned two degrees from Yale University, a B.A. in philosophy in 1915, and a B.M. in music composition in 1917. For his final graduate project he conducted his orchestral composition Fantaisie Polonaise. One of Moore's composition classmates at Yale was Roger Sessions.

While a student at Yale, Moore's father died in Pasadena on 18 April 1915. His father was a millionaire, and left Moore a considerable fortune which allowed him to freely pursue his music interests and live comfortably with the services of a butler and cook for the rest of his life. In the summer of 1916 he was a fellow at the MacDowell Colony, and he later returned to MacDowell multiple times during his career.

=== War Service, Paris studies, and marriage (1917–1921) ===
Moore further utilized his song writing skillset while serving in the United States Navy for two years during the Great War as a lieutenant from 1917 through 1919, writing songs to entertain his fellow servicemen in the Navy. One of these songs, "Destroyer Life", appeared in the 1928 anthology Songs My Mother Never Taught Me which Moore co-authored with John Jacob Niles, bringing Moore his first recognition as a songwriter. Other songs penned by Moore from this era included "Santy Anna", "When I Lays Down", "Ate My Breakfast", "Hanging Johnnie", and "Jail Song", many of them humorous accounts of life in the navy or about romantic liaisons with local women while on shore leave. He also wrote music to several poems by his friend MacLeish during this time. His songs demonstrated music influences from Tin Pan Alley, vaudeville, American folk tunes, and minstrel shows.

After leaving the Navy, Moore pursued graduate studies at the Schola Cantorum de Paris from 1919 through 1921, where his teachers included Vincent d'Indy (composition) and Charles Tournemire (organ). Tournemire left his teaching post in 1920, and Moore completed his organ studies with Nadia Boulanger. From D'Indy, Moore gained a compositional style similar to César Franck who had been D'Indy's teacher. While his music later moved in other directions beyond this style, Moore credited D'Indy for giving him a grounding in musical form from which he composed during the rest of his career.

While a student in Paris, Moore returned to the United States to wed Emily Bailey, a close friend since his Hotchkiss days, on 16 September 1920 at Martha's Vineyard. They spent their honeymoon sailing the eastern coast of the United States before returning as a couple to Paris. In France, the couple were at the center of a social group of American artists all studying in Paris. These included his old Yale friend Stephen Vincent Benét, composer Quincy Porter, and pianist Bruce Simonds (who was later head of the music department at Yale) among others. Emily gave birth to the couple's first child, Mary, in Paris on 7 July 1921.

=== Cleveland and return to Paris (1921–1926) ===
From 1921 through 1925 Moore worked as the curator of music at the Cleveland Museum of Art (CMA), and concurrently served as organist at Adelbert College of Western Reserve University (now Case Western Reserve University) from 1923 through 1925. At the CMA he gave weekly organ concerts on the CMA's McMyler Memorial Organ which was built by Ernest M. Skinner during his first year with the museum in 1921, and then installed in 1922. In addition to performing these concerts, his other CMA duties included directing a children's music program of regular weekly classes, giving public lectures on music history and appreciation, and coordinating a chamber music concert series. He used his position at the CMA to champion American composers and their music through programming their works.

During his time at CMA, Moore continued his education through continued composition studies with Ernest Bloch in his masterclass at the Cleveland Institute of Music in 1921–1922. His classmates included composers Theodore Chandler, Quincy Porter, Bernard Rogers, and Roger Sessions. Moore thrived under Bloch more so than his earlier composition teachers. Bloch encouraged Moore and his classmates to compose music in their own aesthetic and style rather than conform to a specific aesthetic for their assignments.

Moore also worked as a leading actor at the Cleveland Play House (CPH) in the 1920s. Roles he portrayed at this theater included Reverend Cyril Smith in G. K. Chesterton's Magic (1922–1923 season); Henry Higgins in George Bernard Shaw's Pygmalion (1923–1924 season); Geoffrey Wareham in Harry Wagstaff Gribble's March Hares (1923; and later reprised in 1928); and the title role in Clare Kummer's Rollo's Wild Oat. His experiences performing at the CPH later informed his work creating pieces for the stage. Reviews of his performances were highly positive, and for a time Moore considered abandoning his career in music and pursuing an acting career.

Moore made his first significant professional contribution as a composer and conductor on November 15, 1923, conducting the premiere of his Four Museum Pieces with the Cleveland Orchestra. That work had originally been composed by Moore for organ while in attendance at the MacDowell Colony in the summer of 1922, and, after encouragement from Daniel Gregory Mason, was orchestrated by Moore at the MacDowell Colony in the summer of 1923. Moore titled each movement after a work of art in the collection of the CMA. During these summers at MacDowell, Moore also composed several art songs to poems by Stephen Vincent Benét ("A Nonsense Song" and "A Sad Song"), Archibald MacLeish ("April Weather"), and Elinor Wylie ("The Apple Boughs Bend"), all of which were performed at MacDowell with the poets in attendance. In 1926 Moore joined the board of directors of the Edward MacDowell Association which ran the MacDowell Colony among other things.

In 1923 Moore met and befriended the poet Vachel Lindsay, a relationship which had a significant impact on the future trajectory of Moore's compositional focus. Lindsay persuaded Moore to write music using American culture and history as its inspiration, and from this point on Moore's compositional output was mostly based on American subjects or themes for the rest of his life. His first American themed work was the symphonic piece Pageant of P.T. Barnum (composed 1924). Well received at its premiere by the Cleveland Orchestra under Nikolai Sokoloff on 28 March 1926, this work was the first piece by Moore to bring the composer recognition among the broader public. The piece enjoyed a great deal of popularity in America during the mid 20th century, but has since been programmed infrequently. He also composed the 104th Cavalry Regiment March in 1924 in honor of the regiment of the same name of the Pennsylvania Army National Guard, a work later arranged for band by Joseph C. Painter. In 1925 he composed incidental music for a production of William Shakespeare's Twelfth Night on a commission from Richard Boleslawski's American Laboratory Theatre (ALT). He continued to compose incidental music for the ALT in succeeding years for productions of Much Ado About Nothing and Robert E. Sherwood's The Road to Rome in 1927.

From the autumn of 1925 through the spring of 1926 Moore studied composition with Boulanger in Paris after being awarded a Joseph Pulitzer National Traveling Scholarship in recognition of his Four Museum Pieces. While Moore had a positive experience as an organ pupil of Boulanger, his compositional studies were not happy ones under her tutelage. His interests in sentimental American subjects, opera, musical theatre, folk music, and a penchant for more conservative melodic writing clashed with Boulanger's progressive aesthetic of musical modernism. Moore stated the following about Boulanger:

"We never got along in composition. She didn't like what I could do and I didn't like what she taught. She was a devotee of Fauré and Stravinsky. She didn't want you to be yourself."

As a result, Moore's time with Boulanger was not productive, with only a few small chamber pieces for woodwinds surviving. However, Moore did gain from Boulanger a stronger grounding in counterpoint and general musicianship skills, and he met several esteemed musicians in Boulanger's circle which proved to be valuable professional contacts in his career. He also devoted time to some vocal works while in Paris, although it is not clear if Boulanger had any input into these works. The most important of these was the Ballad of William Sycmamore which used text by Stephen Vincent Benét, and was scored for baritone voice, flute, trombone, and piano. He also worked on his first stage work while in Paris, the musical Oh, Oh, Tennessee, but the work has never been published or performed.

=== Columbia University (1926–1962) ===
After Moore returned to New York from Paris, he joined the music faculty at Barnard College, Columbia University in the fall of 1926. The success of the Pageant of P.T. Barnum upon its New York career at Carnegie Hall on January 18, 1927, and the work's win of the 1927 Eastman School of Music Orchestra Contest had a positive impact on Moore's career at Columbia. He was rapidly promoted from adjunct faculty member to assistant professor at the wider Columbia University and head of the music department at Barnard College specifically on July 1, 1927.

From 1926 through 1935 Moore was the conductor of Columbia University's orchestra. Under his leadership, Moore was instrumental in instituting several new policies in the music program at Columbia. These included giving students college credit for playing in the orchestra and taking music lessons for the first time, opening up the orchestra to women players for the first time, and instituting scholarships for instrumentalists in the orchestra that were difficult to obtain (such as oboists and bassoonists). In addition to his busy schedule administrating the music program and conducting orchestra rehearsals and concerts, Moore taught courses in music appreciation. This latter work led to the publication of his first book, Listening to Music (1932), which was written for a general audience without any music background. The book explained the basic elements of music: melody, harmony, polyphony, tonality, rhythm, and form with a suggested guide to recordings for listening and further reading. It was one of the earliest, if not the earliest, music textbooks to incorporate music recordings into the text.

In 1940 Moore succeeded Daniel Gregory Mason as head of the music faculty at Columbia, a post he held for the next 22 years. During his tenure he served as the administering secretary of the Alice M. Ditson Fund which was responsible for funding works by composers like Béla Bartók, Benjamin Britten, Gian Carlo Menotti, Walter Piston, and Virgil Thomson among others. He retired from Columbia in 1962 after having taught at that institution for 36 years.

Moore died July 25, 1969, in Eastern Long Island Hospital in Greenport, New York; he was 75. After the funeral at Cutchogue Presbyterian Church, he was buried in Cutchogue Cemetery.

Moore was a member from 1941 of the National Institute and American Academy of Arts and Letters. He served as president from 1953 until 1956. In 1954 he was a co-founder, with Otto Luening and Oliver Daniel, of the CRI (Composers Recordings, Inc.) record label.

His second book was,From Madrigal to Modern Music (1942).

=== Work as a composer (1926–1966) ===
==== 1926–1929 ====
During his time at Columbia, Moore remained active as a composer, writing works with American themes. The first major work he composed during this time was the symphonic poem Moby-Dick (1928), which told the story of Melville's 1851 novel of the same name through music. This is one of the few compositions by Moore which attempted to embrace elements of musical modernism with applications of quartal and quintal harmony, polytonality, frequent metre changes, increased dissonance, and atonality, all techniques not usually found in Moore's works. The work was likely an attempt to utilize techniques learned by Moore from Boulanger, and an attempt to write in a style currently in vogue with his contemporaries. Premiered by the Rochester Philharmonic, the work was not well received, and Moore never again chose to create a piece in this modernist style.

In 1928 Moore co-authored a collection of songs from World War I with John Jacob Niles entitled Songs My Mother Never Taught Me. The anthology included mainly anonymous songs from the army and navy which were arranged by the two men, but also included some original music from Moore's songwriting days while in the navy. Moore also contributed the children's songs "The Cupboard" and "Fingers and Toes" to the 1928 anthology New Songs for New Voices. Moore also composed music for a planned play on American outlaw Jesse James for the ALT that year, but financial issues ultimately prevented that project from making it to the stage. His 1929 Violin sonata was written for violinist Hildegarde Donaldson.

==== 1930s ====
In the summer of 1930 on the Moore family farm in Cutchogue, Moore began composing his first symphony: A Symphony of Autumn in three movements. Completed in 1931, the symphony was dedicated to composer and conductor Howard Hanson who conducted the Rochester Philharmonic in the work's premiere on April 2, 1931. The symphony incorporates programmatic elements while maintaining a traditional symphonic form, although the work omits the scherzo movement.

Moore conducted the Manhattan Symphony Orchestra in the premiere of his Overture on an American Tune on December 11, 1932. The work was originally titled Babbitt after the 1922 novel of the same name by Sinclair Lewis. Program notes at the work's premiere indicate that the piece was meant to express musical ideas inspired by the "maligned" title character of the novel. Utilizing a sonata form structure, the overture uses the tune "Sweet Adeline" by Tin Pan Alley composer Henry W. Armstrong as a motif. Moore develops the melody to this tune using the techniques of augmentation, diminution, and retrograde.

Moore's String quartet was premiered by the Arion String Quartet at Barnard College on November 16, 1933, just two weeks before the death of his mother in Pasadena on December 1, 1933. The string quartet was dedicated to the Roth Quartet and is written in Moore's characteristic melodic style with effective use of countermelodies and modal harmony.

In 1934 Moore was awarded a Guggenheim Fellowship which enabled him to spend time in Bermuda composing his first opera, White Wings, after the 1926 Broadway play by dramatist Philip Barry. Moore had seen the work on Broadway, and was one of several composers interested in adapting work with a music setting, among them Kurt Weil. Two of Moore's old school friends, magazine magnate and Hotchkiss alumnus Henry Luce and poet and Yale alumnus Stephen Vincent Benét, were instrumental in convincing Barry to select Moore to adapt the play as an opera. The work was supposed to be mounted by the Federal Theatre Project in 1935, but a union strike by workers put an end to the planned staging. The overture for the opera was premiered by the Brooklyn Symphony Orchestra in June 1935, but a staging of the opera did not happen until fourteen years later when it was mounted by The Hartt School on February 10, 1949. Conflicts with Barry and his widow prevented the opera from being published.

In 1936 ethnomusicologist and music educator Willard Rhodes, then music director for the Bronxville Union Free School District, commissioned Moore to write an operetta based on Mayne Reid's 1866 novel The Headless Horseman. Written in the style of Gilbert and Sullivan, the Bronxville High School presented the world premiere of the work on March 5, 1937. Stephen Vincent Benet wrote the libretto to the work. This opera was regularly performed at American high schools and universities during the 20th century.

Moore and Benet collaborated again on the folk opera The Devil and Daniel Webster (1939) which was adapted from Benet's 1936 novel of the same name. Composed in the years 1937 through 1939, the work premiered at Broadway 's Martin Beck Theatre on 18 May 1939 in a double bill with Virgil Thomson's Filling Station.

=== 1950s ===
Moore was also influenced by jazz and ragtime, developed by African Americans. This is most readily apparent in his operas. The Ballad of Baby Doe has several rag elements (a honky-tonk piano is used extensively in the first scene). In his "soap opera" Gallantry (1950), the commercials for Lochinvar soap and Billy Boy wax are sung in a blueslike fashion. The allegretto from his second symphony has been described as having an almost neoclassical style.

Douglas Moore's music has been described as having a "modesty, grace and tender lyricism", especially marking the slower passages of many works, especially his Symphony in A major and the clarinet quintet. The faster movements of these works have "robust, jovial and a somewhat terpsichorean quality." Most of Moore's energy was devoted to music for opera rather than to orchestral works.

The novel Giants in the Earth was written by a Norwegian American and first published in Norwegian in 1921–1922. Moore's English-language adaptation won the 1951 Pulitzer Prize for Music.

== Selected works ==
=== Stage works ===
- Oh, Oh, Tennessee, musical comedy (1925)
- Twelfth Night, incidental music (1925)
- Much Ado About Nothing, incidental music (1927)
- The Road to Rome, incidental music (1927)
- Jesse James (1928)
- Greek Games, ballet (1930)
- White Wings, chamber opera (1935)
- The Headless Horseman, operetta (1936)
- The Devil and Daniel Webster, folk opera (1939)
- The Emperor's New Clothes, children's opera (1948)
- Puss in Boots, children's operetta (1950)
- Giants in the Earth, opera (1951)
- The Ballad of Baby Doe, opera (1956)
- Gallantry, a "soap opera" (1958)
- The Wings of the Dove, opera (1961), based on 1902 eponymous novel by Henry James
- The Greenfield Christmas Tree (1962)
- Carry Nation, opera (1966)

=== Orchestral works ===
- Four Museum Pieces (1923)
- The Pageant of P. T. Barnum, suite (1924)
  1. The Pageant of P. T. Barnum
  2. Joice Heth – 161-year-old Negress
  3. General and Mrs. Tom Thumb
  4. Jenny Lind
- Moby Dick, symphonic poem (1928)
- A Symphony of Autumn (1930–31)
- Overture on an American Tune (1932)
- Village Music, suite (1941)
- In memoriam (1943)
- Down East suite, also arranged for violin and piano (1944)
- Symphony No. 2 in A major (1945)
- Farm Journal, suite (1947)
- Cotillion Suite (1952)

=== Chamber works ===
- Violin sonata (1929)
- String quartet (1933)
- Quintet for woodwinds and horn (1942)
- Quintet for clarinet and strings (1946)
- Piano trio (1953)

=== Film music ===
- Power in the Land (1940, material later used for Farm Journal in 1947)
- Youth Gets a Break (1940)
- Bip Goes to Town (1941)

=== Organ ===
- Prelude and Fugue(composed from 1919 to 1922)
- March (1922)
- 4 Museum Pieces (1922)
- Scherzo (1923)

=== Piano ===
- 3 Contemporaries: Careful Etta, Grievin' Annie, Fiddlin' Joe' (composed 1935–40)
- 4 Museum Piece (1939)
- Passacaglia suite (1948)
- 4 Pieces (1955)
- Dance for a Holiday (1957)
- Prelude (1957)
- Summer Holiday (1961)

=== Choral works ===
- Perhaps to Dream (S. V. Benét), SSA chorus (1937)
- Simon Legree (V. Lindsay), TTBB (1937)
- Dedication (A. MacLeish), SSATBB chorus (1938)
- Prayer for England, TTBB chorus (1940)
- Prayer for the United Nations (S.V. Benét), A/Bar, chorus (1943)
- Westren Winde, canon (1946)
- Vayechulu (Heb.), cantor, chorus, org, (1947–8)
- Birds' Courting Song, tenor soloist and chorus (1953)
- The Mysterious Cat (1960)
- Mary's Prayer, soprano soloist and SSA chorus (1962)
