= List of dams and reservoirs in Minnesota =

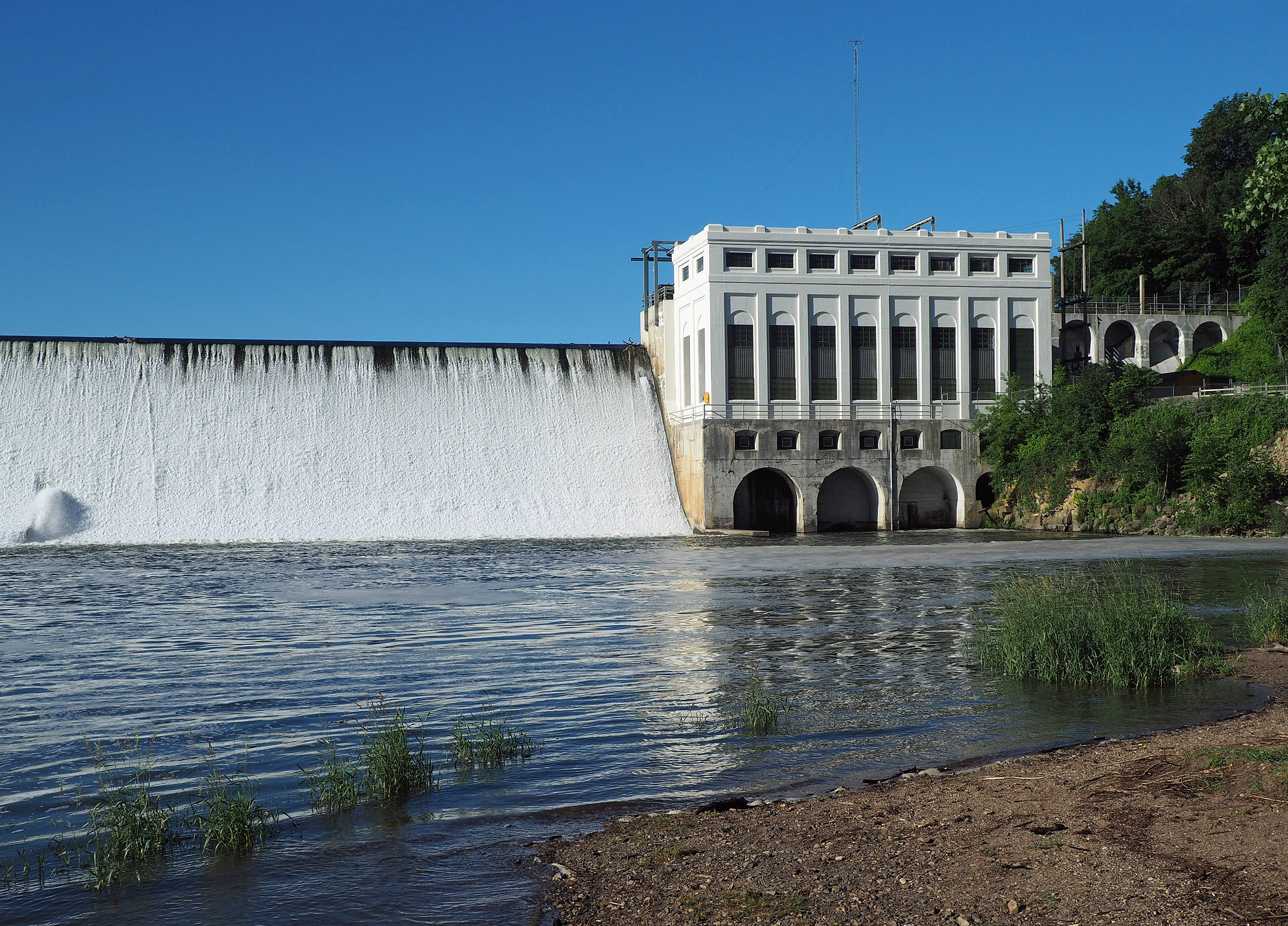
Lake Zumbro Hydroelectric Generating Plant, designed by Hugh Lincoln Cooper and completed in 1919. It still serves the city of Rochester, Minnesota, and is on the National Register of Historic Places.

This is a list of dams and reservoirs in the U.S. state of Minnesota and pertinent data in a sortable table. There are more than 1,250 dams in the state. Over 800 are public facilities and of these 430 are owned by the Minnesota Department of Natural Resources.

This list includes the most notable structures, namely all that generate hydroelectricity, any operated by the Mississippi Valley Division of the United States Army Corps of Engineers (USACE), and all dams with reservoirs larger than 100,000 acre feet according to the USACE National Inventory of Dams Notable structures in popular recreation areas are also included, in particular those at the headwaters of the Mississippi and along the North Shore of Lake Superior. Historically significant structures as well as dams whose removal have sparked media interest are also included. Furthermore, there are many dams that have yet to be listed that call Minnesota home.

== List of Minnesota dams and reservoirs ==
Key to symbols
†	Dam located on a border with another state
‡	Dam located on the border with Canada
*	Facility does not fall under the authority of the FERC
–	Data point not applicable

Dam (Note: Official name. Common names other than the official name follow, separated by semicolons.)	County (Note: County were dam is located. If structure straddles borders, additional counties separated by semicolon. County where main access is located listed first)	Owner (Note: If multiple owners, names separated by semicolon. Hydropower companies, if separate from dam owner, are listed second.)	Y (Note: Year when the original main dam structure was completed. Year(s) of major modification also listed, separated by semicolon. Modification years for Mississippi River Locks and Dams comes from USACE Mississippi Valley Division, St. Paul District data.)	Type (Note: If more than one type, listed in order of importance separated by semicolon.)	Height (Note: NID height is defined as the maximum value of the structural height and hydraulic height. Accepted as the general height of the dam.)		Impounds (Note: Official name of the reservoir impounded by the dam. If the installation is run-of-the-river with no geographically-defined reservoir, value is "ROR".)	Reservoir Capacity (Note: NID maximum storage in acre-feet, defined as the total storage space in the reservoir below the maximum attainable water surface elevation, including any surcharge storage. Accepted as the general storage of the dam.)		MW (Note: Nameplate capacity in MWs of hydroelectric plant(s), if any.)	River (Note: Official name of the river or stream on which the dam is built. If unnamed, it is identified as a tributary to a named river by appending -tr to the name. If offstream, the name is appended with -os.)	Primary purpose (Note: The order indicates the relative decreasing importance of the purpose.)
Dam	County	Owner	Y	Type	ft	m	Impounds	acre.ft	dam^{3}	MW	River	Primary purpose
Aaron Lake Dam	Douglas	MNDNR	1964	Gravity	8	2.4	Lake Aaron	190,000	230,000	—	Chippewa	Recreation
Bemidji Dam *	Beltrami	Otter Tail Power	1907	Gravity	33	10	Lake Bemidji	4,500	5,600	0.1	Mississippi	Hydroelectric
Big Stone Lake Dam †	Big Stone; Roberts	MNDNR	1937	Gravity	15	4.6	Big Stone Lake	205,000	253,000	—	Minnesota	Hydroelectric
Blanchard Dam	Morrison	Minnesota Power	1925	Gravity	46	14	ROR	16,358	20,177	18.0	Mississippi	Hydroelectric
Blandin Dam	Itasca	Minnesota Power	1916	Gravity	21	6.4	Paper Mill Reservoir	4,000	4,900	2.1	Mississippi	Hydroelectric
Brainerd Dam	Crow Wing	City-owned	1888	Gravity	22	6.7	Rice Lake	13,000	16,000	3.3	Mississippi	Hydroelectric
Coon Rapids Dam	Anoka; Hennepin	Three Rivers Park District	1913; 2010	Gravity	35	11	ROR	2,000	2,500	—	Mississippi	Recreation
Dayton Hollow Dam	Otter Tail	Otter Tail Power	1908	Gravity	41	12	Dayton Hollow Reservoir	5,000	6,200	1.0	Otter Tail	Hydroelectric; wildlife; recreation
Dead Lake Dam	Otter Tail	MNDNR	1938	Gravity	9	2.7	Dead Lake	100,240	123,640	—	Dead River	Recreation
Deer Lake Dam	Itasca	MNDNR	1938	Earth	8	2.4	Deer Lake	324,984	400,862	—	Deer	Recreation
Dillon-Boulton-Syltie (Porter Dam)	Lincoln	Yellow Medicine River Watershed District (YMRWD)	1974	Earth	32	9.75	Porter Reservoir (Alternate names: Dillon's Pond, Lake O'Lena, Lake Porter)	827,640	1,020,879		Unnamed tributary of North Branch Yellow Medicine River	Flood control; public recreation; water supply; wildlife
Fales-VanHyfte/Lake John Dam	Yellow Medicine	Yellow Medicine River Watershed District (YMRWD)	1981		45	13.72	Fales-VanHyfte/Lake John Reservoir	862,488	1,063,863		Yellow Medicine River Watershed	Food control; public recreation; water supply; wildlife
Fond du Lac Dam	Carlton	Minnesota Power	1924	Arch; Earth	80	24	ROR	2,675	3,300	14.2	St. Louis	Hydroelectric
Granite Falls Dam	Yellow Medicine	City-owned	1911	Gravity	21	6.4	ROR	36,800	45,400	1.2	Minnesota	Hydroelectric
Hauschild-Thange Dam	Lincoln	Yellow Medicine River Watershed District (YMRWD)	1980	Earth	52	15.85	Hauschild-Thange Reservoir	1,176,120	1,450,722		Yellow Medicine River Watershed	Flood control; private recreation; water supply; wildlife
Heron Lake Outlet Dam	Jackson	MNDNR	1937	Earth	10	3.0	Heron Lake	100,000	120,000	—	Des Moines-tr	Recreation
Hibbing Taconite Starter Dam No. 1	St. Louis	Hibbing Taconite Company	1937	Earth	100	30	—	125,000	154,000	—	Day Brook	Tailings
Hoot Lake Dam; Diversion Dam	Otter Tail	Otter Tail Power	1913	Gravity	10	3.0	Hoot Lake	99	122	1.0	Otter Tail	Wildlife; hydroelectric; water supply
International Falls Dam ‡; Rainy Lake Dam (Note: Rainy Lake is controlled by 4 structures: International Falls Dam, the main hydroelectric project spanning Rainy River between International Falls, Minnesota and Fort Frances, Ontario; two more at Kettle Falls controlling water entering Rainy Lake from Namakan Lake; and Sturgeon Falls Generating Station on the Seine River, Ontario. These dams are sometimes considered as one grouping called the "Rainy Lake Control Structures", however the three sites are many miles apart.)	Koochiching; Fort Frances	Boise Cascade; H2O Power	1909; 2017	Gravity Arch	38	12	Rainy Lake	4,000,000	4,900,000	14.4	Rainy	Hydroelectric; flood control; water supply
Island Lake Dam (Note: Island Lake Dam consists of two separate NID listed structures built at the same time; Main Dam and Island Lake North Dike. The dike is a concrete/gravity/earth structure 21 ft. high and 331 ft. long. Both impound the same pool.)	St. Louis	Minnesota Power	1915	Gravity; Earth	57	17	Island Lake Reservoir	177,000	218,000	—	Cloquet	Hydroelectric; recreation
Kettle Falls Dam ‡ (Note: Kettle Falls Dam consists of 2 structures on either side of Kettle Island, divided into the American Dam and another on the Canadian channel called International Dam. Both were constructed at the same time to control the flow of water into Rainy River from Namakan Lake.)	St. Louis	Boise Cascade	1914; 1999	Buttress	20	6.1	Namakan Lake	702,500	866,500	—	Rainy-tr	Recreation; other
Knife Falls Dam	Carlton	Minnesota Power	1922	Earth	18	5.5	ROR	1,763	2,175	2.4	St. Louis	Hydroelectric
Knutson Dam	Cass	USFS	1929	Timber	9	2.7	Cass	106,051	130,812	—	Mississippi	Flood control
Lac qui Parle Dam	Lac qui Parle	USACE	1939; 1996	Gravity; Earth	35	11	Lac qui Parle	122,800	151,500	—	Minnesota	Flood control
Lake Byllesby Dam	Dakota; Goodhue	Dakota Electric Coop	1911; 2011	Buttress	75	23	Rice Lake	13,000	16,000	1.8	Cannon	Hydroelectric; recreation
Leech Lake Dam	Cass	MNDNR	1885; 1957	Gravity; Earth	11	3.4	Leech Lake	838,767	1,034,604	—	Leech	Flood control; recreation
Little Falls Dam	Morrison	Minnesota Power	1914; 1979	Gravity	30	9.1	ROR	4,780	5,900	4.7	Mississippi	Hydroelectric; recreation
Lock and Dam No. 1; Ford Dam	Hennepin; Ramsey	USACE; Twin Cities Hydro	1917; 1983	Gravity	56	17	Pool 1	9,300	11,500	17.9	Mississippi	Hydroelectric; navigation; recreation
Lock and Dam No. 2	Dakota; Washington	USACE; City-owned	1948; 1995	Gravity; Earth	42	13	Pool 2	787,000	971,000	4.4	Mississippi	Hydroelectric; navigation; recreation
Lock and Dam No. 3 †	Goodhue; Pierce	USACE	1938; 1991	Gravity; Earth	44	13	Pool 3	1,110,000	1,370,000	—	Mississippi	Navigation; recreation
Lock and Dam No. 4 †	Buffalo; Wabasha	USACE	1935; 1994	Gravity; Earth	42	13	Lake Pepin; Pool 4	878,000	1,083,000	—	Mississippi	Navigation; recreation
Lock and Dam No. 5 †	Winona; Buffalo	USACE	1935; 1998	Gravity; Earth	43	13	Pool 5	106,600	131,500	—	Mississippi	Navigation; recreation
Lock and Dam No. 5A †	Winona; Buffalo	USACE	1936; 2000	Gravity; Earth	46	14	Pool 5A	260,000	320,000	—	Mississippi	Navigation; recreation
Lock and Dam No. 6 †	Trempealeau; Winona	USACE	1936; 1999	Gravity; Earth	40	12	Pool 6	180,000	220,000	—	Mississippi	Navigation; recreation
Lock and Dam No. 7 †	Winona; La Crosse	USACE	1937; 2002	Gravity; Earth	41	12	Pool 7	105,000	130,000	—	Mississippi	Navigation; recreation
Lock and Dam No. 8 †	Vernon; Houston	USACE	1937; 2003	Gravity; Earth	42	13	Pool 8	260,000	320,000	—	Mississippi	Navigation; recreation
Lower Red Lake Dam	Clearwater	USACE	1931	Earth	17	5.2	Red Lake Reservoir	3,428,000	4,228,000	—	Red Lake	Flood control; water supply
Miltona Lake Dam	Douglas	MNDNR	1937; 1988	Earth	8	2.4	Lake Miltona	280,224	345,651	—	Long Prairie River	Other
Orwell Dam	Otter Tail	USACE	1953	Gravity; Earth	60	18	Orwell Lake	20,600	25,400	—	Otter Tail	Water supply; flood control
Otter Tail Lake Dam	Otter Tail	MNDNR	1936	Gravity	10	3.0	Otter Tail Lake	557,200	687,300	—	Otter Tail	Other
Pelican Lake Dam (Note: Pelican Lake Dam consists of a main structure and several earthen dikes in various locations to control the level of Pelican Lake, one of the larger lakes in the state.)	St. Louis	County-owned	1938; 2002	Gravity	10	3.0	Pelican	240,790	297,010	—	Pelican	Wildlife; other
Pokegama Lake Dam; Pokegama Reservoir Dam (Note: Pokegama Dam consists of a main structure and 5 concrete/earthen dikes in 3 locations that form a system of connected lakes. All are at the same height and impound the same pool.)	Itasca	USACE	1884; 1936	Gravity; Timber	17	5.2	Lake Pokegama	120,000	150,000	—	Mississippi	Recreation; flood control; navigation
Rapidan Dam	Blue Earth	Blue Earth County	1910	Gravity	87	27	Rapidan Reservoir			—	Blue Earth	Hydroelectric
St. Anthony Falls Lower Lock and Dam	Hennepin County	USACE; SAF Hydro	1956	Gravity	58	18	Intermediate Pool	420	520	9.0	Mississippi	Hydroelectric; recreation
St. Anthony Falls Upper Lock and Dam and Hennepin Island Hydroelectric Plant (Note: St. Anthony Falls has a complex history. The current lock and dam structure was built in 1963, however there have been many dams at this location since the first was built in 1847. A massive concrete apron was constructed in 1869 after a partial collapse of the falls. The existing hydroelectric station was built in 1882 on the same pool but is distinct from the existing dam. A separate hydroelectric project is under development on the opposite of the river in a decommissioned lock.)	Hennepin County	USACE; Xcel Energy; Crown Hydro	1882; 1963	Gravity	49	15	Upper St. Anthony Falls Pool	4,900	6,000	14.2	Mississippi	Hydroelectric; recreation
St. Cloud Dam	Sherburne; Stearns	City-owned	1972; 1988	Gravity	22.3	6.8	ROR	2,254	2,780	8.9	Mississippi	Hydroelectric; water supply
St. Croix Falls Dam †	Polk; Chisago	Xcel Energy	1905	Gravity Arch	60	18	ROR	14,400	17,800	25.0	St. Croix	Hydroelectric; recreation
Sandy Lake Dam	Aitkin	USACE	1895	Gravity	22	6.7	Big Sandy Lake	79,400	97,900	—	Mississippi-tr	Hydroelectric
Sartell Dam; Champion Dam	Benton; Stearns	Verso Paper; Eagle Creek Renewable	1905; 1985	Gravity	23	7.0	Little Rock Lake	28,000	35,000	9.5	Mississippi	Hydroelectric; recreation
Scanlon Dam	Carlton	Minnesota Power	1922	Earth	18	5.5	ROR	1,763	2,175	1.6	St. Louis	Hydroelectric
Sylvan Dam	Cass	Minnesota Power	1930	Gravity	35	11	ROR	9,216	11,368	1.8	Mississippi	Hydroelectric
Thomson Dam (Note: The Thomson Water Project consists of multiple dams and water control structures located in and around Thomson, Minnesota, and nearby Jay Cooke State Park. The 1600 ft long main dam is supplemented by many smaller segments, some of which have been rebuilt and merged over the years. 14 distinct structures are registered in the NID, the tallest is 51 feet.)	Carlton	MNDNR	1907	Gravity; Earth	15	4.6	Thomson Reservoir	4,352	5,368	69.6	St. Louis	Hydroelectric; recreation
Vekins Dam	Clearwater	Private	1880	Timber	4	1.2	ROR	—	—	—	Mississippi	Logging
Winnibigoshish Lake Dam	Cass	USACE	1884; 1990	Earth	7	2.1	Lake Winnibigoshish	678,000	836,000	—	Mississippi	Water supply; flood control
Zumbro Lake Dam*	Wabasha	City-owned	1919	Gravity	65	20	Lake Zumbro	35,000	43,000	2.3	Zumbro	Hydroelectric

=== Data definitions ===
Unless referenced differently, all information in the table above is from the USACE National Inventory of Dams (NID) Specific data fields are defined as follows:

== Failed and removed dams ==
- Berning Mill Dam, St. Michael, Minnesota – Crow River (removed after failure 1986)
- Broken Down Dam, Fergus Falls, Minnesota – Otter Tail River (built 1908, collapsed 1909 - ruins remain in the river for recreation)
- Flandrau Dam, New Ulm, Minnesota – Cottonwood River (built 1930, removed 1995 after repeated damage from floods)
- Hanover Dam, Hanover, Minnesota – Crow River (removed after failure 1984)
- Lac qui Parle Dam, Montevideo, Minnesota – Chippewa (built 1958, removed 2012)
- Lake Florence Dam, Stewartville, Minnesota – Root River (built 1910s, damaged 1993, removed 1994 - Lake Florence no longer exists)
- Meeker Island Lock and Dam – Mississippi River (built 1907, became obsolete and removed 1920)
- Mill Pond Dam, Appleton, Minnesota – Pomme de Terre River (removed after being damaged in a 1997 flood)
- Minnesota Falls Dam, Granite Falls, Minnesota – Minnesota River (built 1909, removed 2010)
- Nevers Dam, Marine on St. Croix, Minnesota – St. Croix River (built 1889, removed 1954 after being damaged)
- Sandstone Dam, Sandstone, Minnesota – Kettle River (20 ft tall hydropower dam built 1908, removed 1999)
- Shady Lake Dam (Oronoco Dam), Oronoco, Minnesota – Zumbro River (built in 1937, removed 2015 after dam failure in 2010)
- Stockton Dam, Stockton, Minnesota – Garvin Brook (30 ft high mill structure built 1910, removed 1994)
- Welch Dam, Welch, Minnesota – Cannon River (built 1890s, removed 1994)

== See also ==
- List of locks and dams of the Upper Mississippi River
