= Lake Blanche (Minnesota) =

Lake in the state of Minnesota, United States

- Location within Minnesota Location within the United States
- Location: Otter Tail County, Minnesota, United States
- Coordinates: 46.35035°N 95.66088°W
- Primary inflows: Battle Creek
- Primary outflows: Blanche Creek
- Basin countries: United States
- Surface area: 2.02 sq mi (5.2 km^{2}) or 1,293 acres
- Max. depth: 64 ft (20 m)
- Settlements: Ottertail, Minnesota

Lake Blanche is a 2.02-square-mile (5.2 km^{2}) lake in the west-central part of the U.S. state of Minnesota, straddling Everts and Girard townships in Otter Tail County.

== Geography ==
Lake Blanche is a part of a chain of lakes in the Otter Tail River Watershed that begins with Crane Lake in Otter Tail County and flows north into Otter Tail Lake. The waters of Lake Blanche ultimately flow north into Hudson Bay via the Red River of the North. The south shore of Lake Blanche is part of Glendalough State Park; upstream from Blanche is Annie Battle Lake which is wholly in the park.

Blanche's maximum depth is 64 feet (20 m); 82% of the lake is 15 feet (4.6 m) deep or less. Blanche is classified as a mesotrophic lake with water clarity of 12 feet (3.7 m) and little algae.

Blanche's shores and bottom are primarily composed of sand and gravel and support a diversity of plants. The lake is ringed with tall, mostly deciduous trees that extend roughly 300 yards back from the shore and that act as a windbreak, keeping the shoreline calm and confining larger waves to the lake's center.

At 1,296 acres, Blanche is the 19th largest lake in Otter Tail County.

== Recreation ==
The lake is suitable for swimming, fishing and small watercraft including paddleboards, kayaks, smaller power-boats, pontoons and sailboats. In the 1980s through the 2000s Blanche hosted the Inland Lakes Regional Sunfish (sailboat) regatta.

Panfish including bluegill, largemouth bass and walleye are prevalent and are the most sought after game fish by anglers.

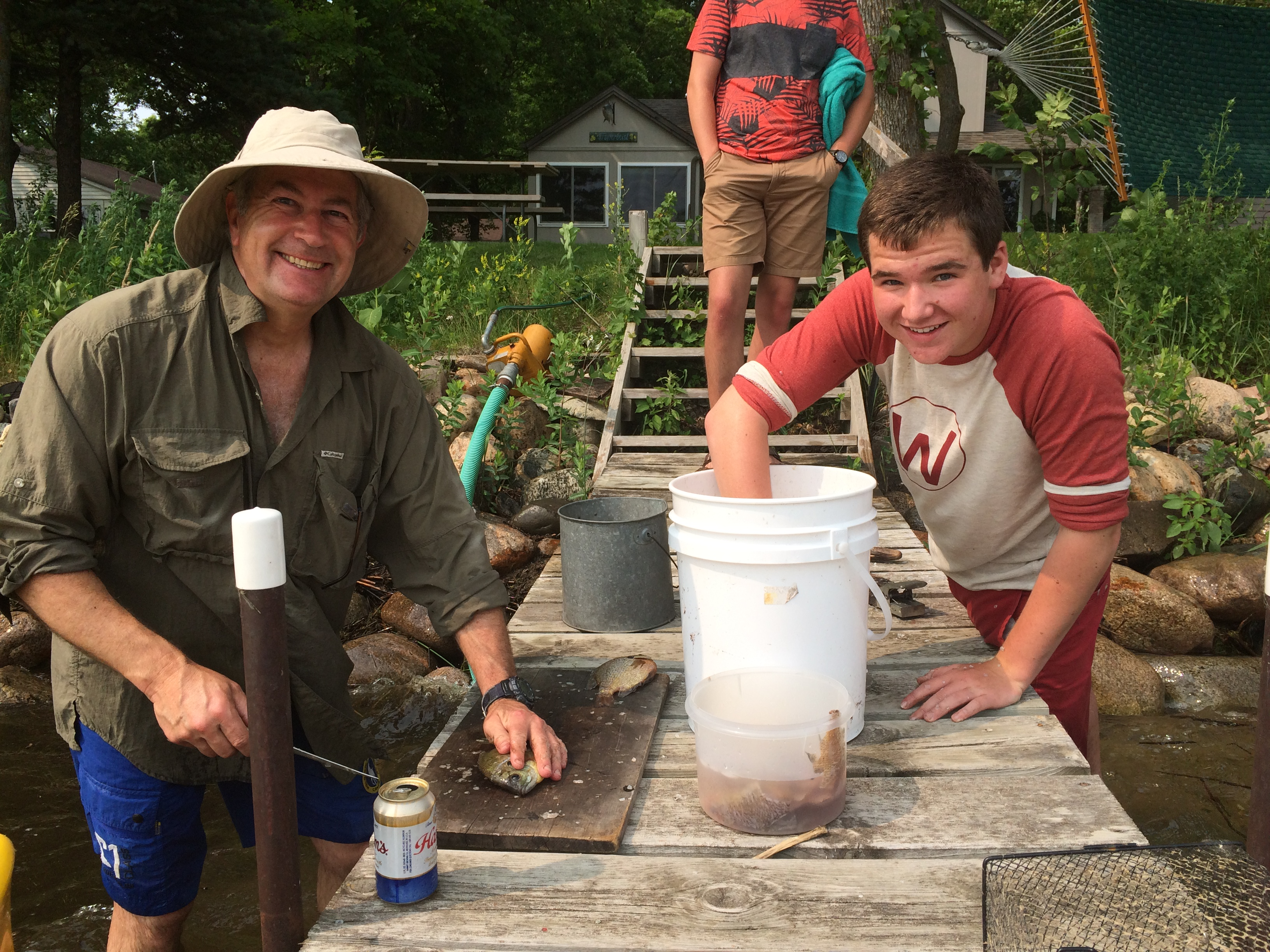
Cleaning fish at Lake Blanche

The Rearing Pond Trail is a 58-acre park between Lake Blanche and Otter Tail Lake popular with walkers and runners. In 2021 the land was acquired by the Otter Tail Water Management District (OTWMD) with funds donated by local property owners to ensure that it remain available for recreational purposes in perpetuity. Before 2021, the land was owned by the Minnesota Department of Natural Resources and known as the Lake Blanche Wildlife Management Area.

There are three seasonal resorts on the lake - Woodlawn Resort, Madsen's Resort, and Holiday Haven Resort & Campground. In a 2000 lake survey 133 seasonal cabins and year-round homes on the north shore of the lake were counted. The south shore, which is part of Glendalough State Park, has never been developed.

== History ==
James G. Craigie, a Scottish immigrant, bought a portion of Lake Blanche's north shore in 1868 from the United States Government. He added this to nearby property he previously settled in 1861 that he named Balmoral and where he built a dam and flour mill. In 1872, Craigie, his wife and a friend drowned in Otter Tail Lake. The ensuing fight over his estate was appealed up to the state supreme court. The result was that Annie McArthur, Craigie's estranged daughter, together with her husband Archibald McArthur, gained control of his property. The north shore of Lake Blanche would be divided and resold several times over the next two decades before the first cabin would be built.

Theodore Northfoss of Wadena, Minnesota built the first cabin on Lake Blanche in 1896. Wadena is roughly 30 miles east of Lake Blanche and could be reached in a single day by horse in the 1890s. The heat of Wadena's summers and Blanche's pleasant environs enticed other Wadena residents to build seasonal cabins near Northfoss in the following years. Later this section of shoreline came to be known as Wadena Beach.

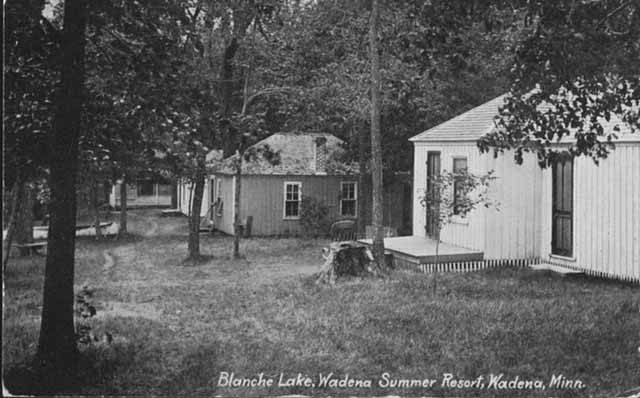
Wadena Beach cabins circa 1925

In 1910 tragedy struck Lake Blanche when two young people, Gladys Wiswell and Frank Kingsley Jr., drowned. In the Pioneer Journal resident Harald E. Boen said it was a “tragedy that depressed the entire community of Wadena and surrounding area ... without question it (the funeral) was the largest one ever held in this community. It seems that the entire community assembled at the church, which was altogether too small to accommodate the people, hundreds remaining without the church doors during the services.”
