= Broken Down Dam =

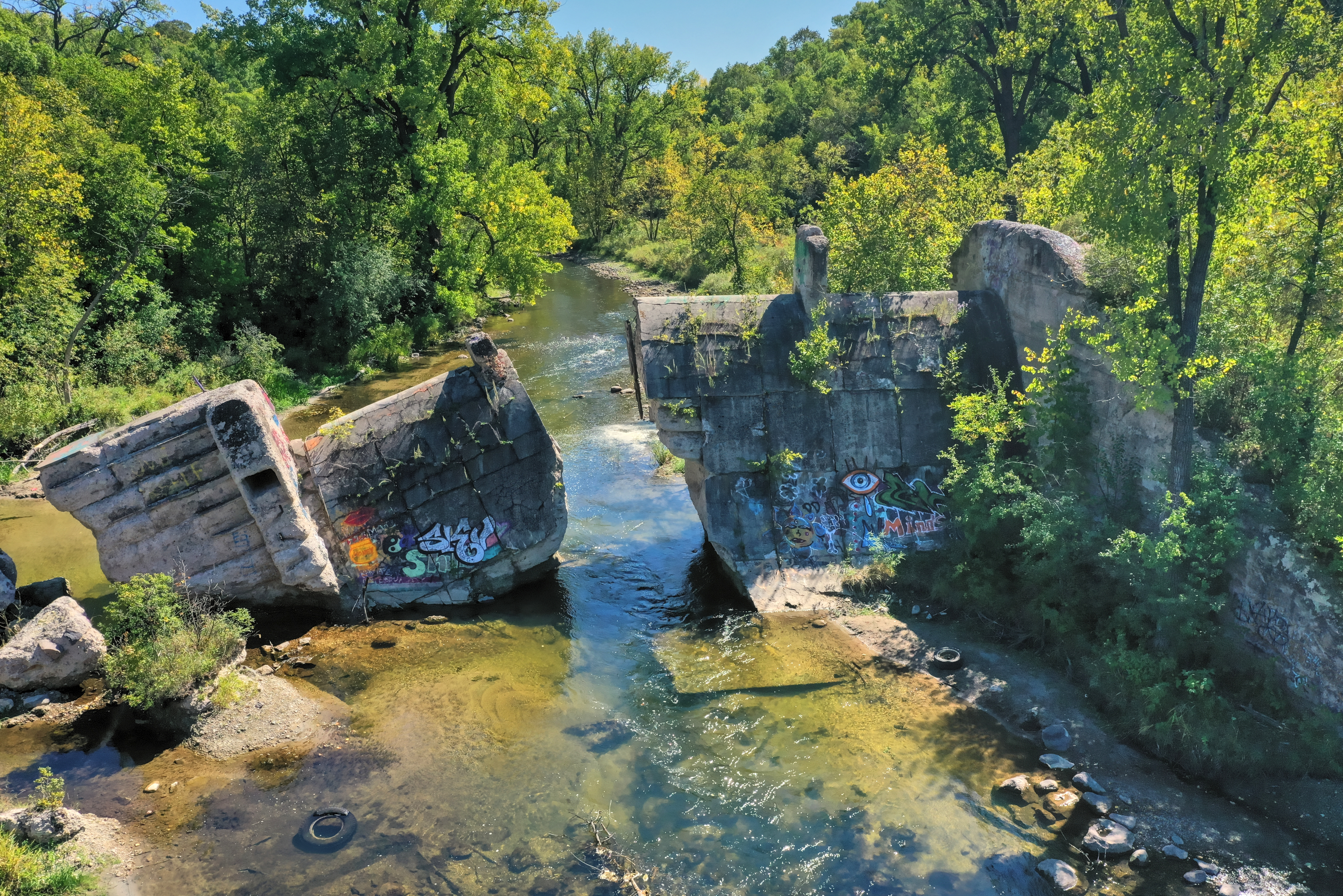
- Broken Down Dam ruins in the Otter Tail River, 2021

- Location within Minnesota
- Official name: Fergus Falls City Light Station
- Location: Otter Tail County, Minnesota, United States
- Coordinates: 46°17′26.7″N 96°01′23.9″W
- Purpose: Power
- Status: Decommissioned
- Construction began: 1907
- Opening date: 1908
- Demolition date: 1909
- Owner: City of Fergus Falls

Dam and spillways
- Type of dam: Gravity dam
- Impounds: Otter Tail River
- Spillway type: uncontrolled overflow

Power Station
- Turbines: 1

Broken Down Dam (formerly the Fergus Falls Hydro Dam or Fergus Falls City Light Station) was a concrete hydroelectric gravity dam on the Otter Tail River in Otter Tail County, Minnesota in the United States. Constructed in 1908 to supply power to the nearby town of Fergus Falls, the dam suddenly failed on September 24, 1909. Collapse of the dam caused the failure of four others downstream as well as significant property damage. There were no deaths. City officials left the damaged structure in place and today its ruins lie along the recreational Otter Tail River State Water Trail at Broken Down Dam Park. The only flood recorded in the history of Fergus Falls was due to this disaster.

== Construction ==
In 1907, the growing city of Fergus Falls began enhancing a dam on the Otter Tail River about two miles upstream at Page Mill to satisfy its electricity needs. The mill had burned several years earlier and the city used the small dam as a power plant. At the same time, the city began constructing a much larger dam about three miles above the city as a permanent replacement. The new dam began generating power in 1908. Engineers had unknowingly built the dam on top of a spring without having done proper site evaluations. By the following year the concrete foundations had been undermined by the spring flows.

== Collapse ==
At 4:20 a.m. on September 24, 1909, dam attendants discovered the electric lights fading and water flowing over the powerhouse floor. They quickly fled along a railway embankment just as the 10-ton generator was swept into the river. They reached a farm, procured a team of horses, and headed towards Fergus Falls to raise alarm. En route they met the city electrical superintendent travelling towards the dam to find out why power had failed and why the station crew had not answered the telephone.

The dam broke in the center and the resulting flood first destroyed the Kirk Dam, which furnished power for the city water works. The water then destroyed the Mount Faith Avenue Bridge. One block further downstream the Red River Mill Dam and Woolen Mill Dam were swept away. Damage to the two mills totaled over $15,000 (equivalent to $537,000 in 2025). The Central Dam in the city also failed. While there was additional flooding to homes and farms, there was no loss of life.

Dayton Hollow Dam, 5 miles (8.0 km) to the southwest, was saved from destruction. Its owner, president of the Otter Tail Power Company Vernon Wright, received enough advance warning to reach his dam by 6:15 a.m. and open the flood gates. Following the disaster, Otter Tail Power was engaged by the city to build their transmission lines into town. This helped spawn a local rumor, fueled by radical newspaper editor Haldor E. Boen, that Wright had deliberately destroyed City Dam by secretly distributing quicksilver from a rowboat to undermine it. Later it was determined natural springs under its foundation made the dam's failure inevitable.

== Site today ==
Broken Down Dam Park, established in 1949, is adjacent to the dam and is 11 acres (4.5 ha) in size. The dam itself forms "odd and engaging" ruins at mile 52 along the Otter Tail River State Water Trail, managed by the Minnesota Department of Natural Resources. During high river flows, water rushes between concrete blocks of the old structure creating Class III rapids.

== See also ==
- List of dams and reservoirs in Minnesota
