= Lake Zumbro Hydroelectric Generating Plant =

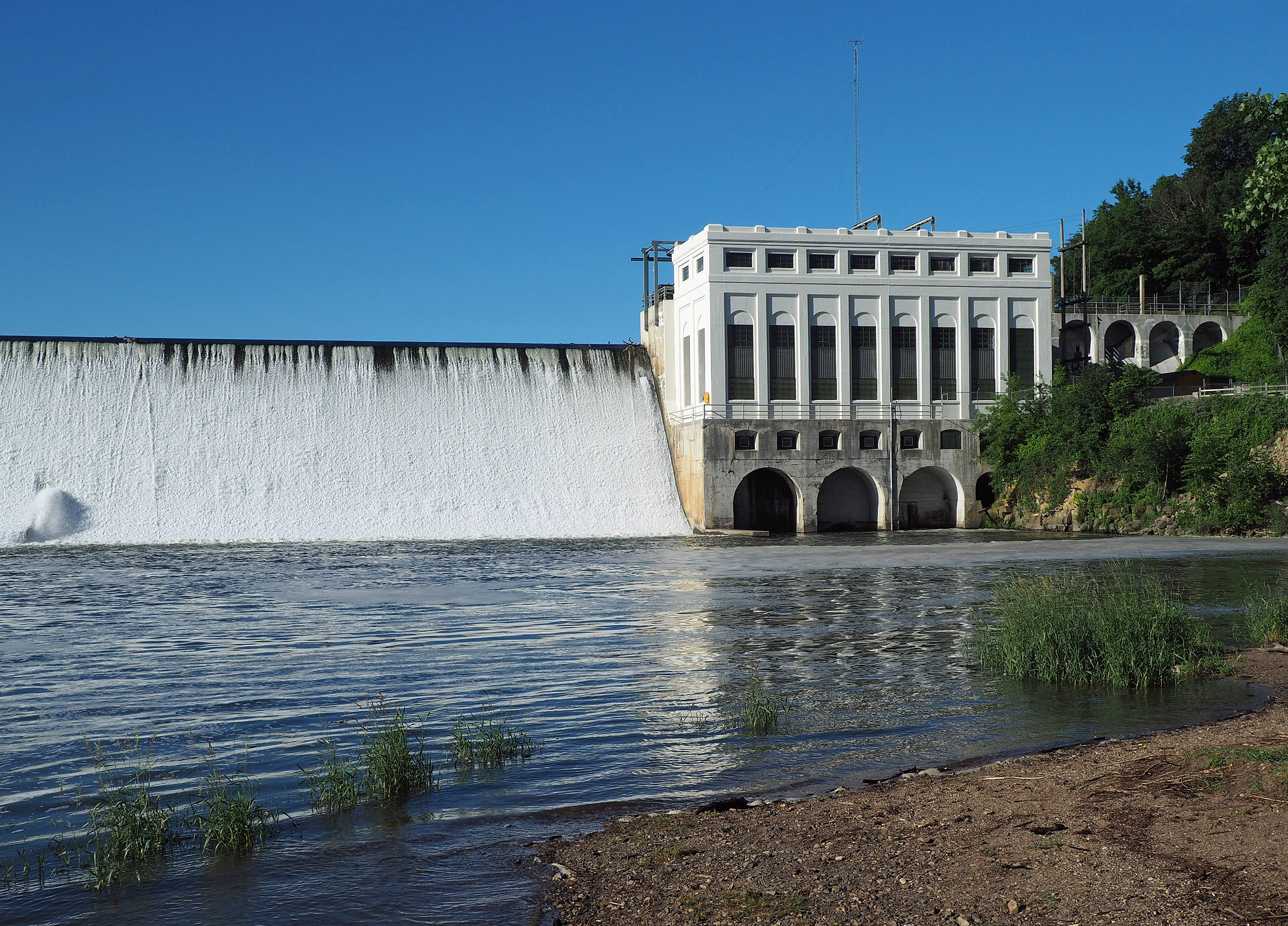
- The Lake Zumbro Hydroelectric Generating Plant and Dam viewed from the north
- Interactive map of Lake Zumbro Hydroelectric Generating Plant
- Country: United States
- Location: Off County Road 21 at north end of Lake Zumbro, Mazeppa Township, Minnesota
- Coordinates: 44°12′46″N 92°28′46″W
- Purpose: Power
- Status: Operational
- Construction began: 1917
- Opening date: 1919
- Construction cost: $1,019,160.95 (equivalent to $25,611,382 in 2025)
- Built by: Omaha Structural Steel Bridge Company
- Designed by: Hugh Lincoln Cooper
- Owner: City of Rochester, Minnesota
- Operator: Rochester Public Utilities

Dam and spillways
- Type of dam: Gravity dam
- Impounds: Zumbro River
- Height (foundation): 66 ft (20 m)
- Length: 904 ft (276 m)
- Width (crest): 7 ft (2.1 m)
- Width (base): 70 ft (21 m)
- Spillways: 1
- Spillway type: Uncontrolled
- Spillway length: 426 ft (130 m)

Reservoir
- Creates: Lake Zumbro
- Surface area: 714.55 acres
- Maximum water depth: 43 ft (13 m)

Power Station
- Type: Run-of-the-river
- Hydraulic head: 55 ft (17 m)
- Turbines: 2 × Francis-type
- Installed capacity: 2.3 MW
- Annual generation: 12.5 GW·h
- Lake Zumbro Hydroelectric Generating Plant
- U.S. National Register of Historic Places
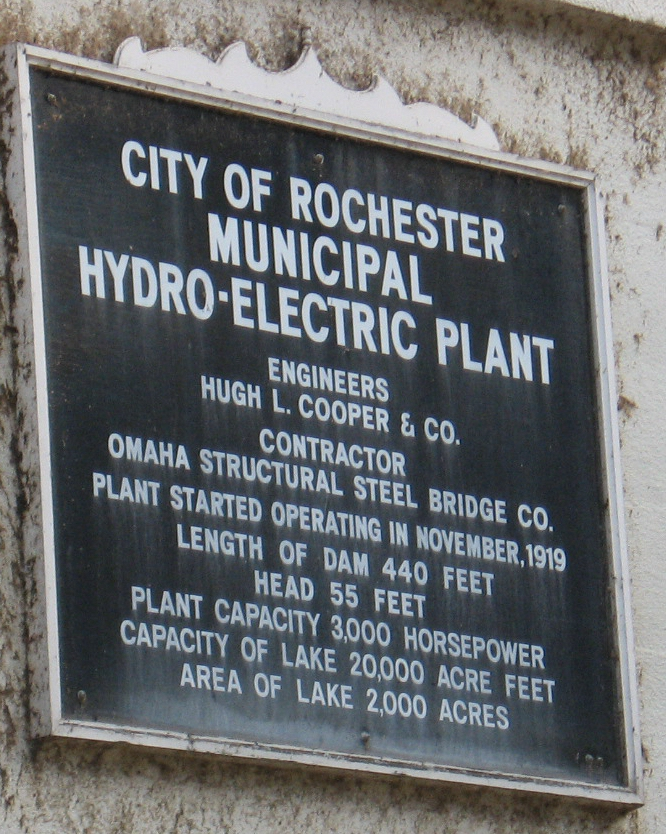
- Sign on the Lake Zumbro Hydroelectric Generating Plant
- Area: 2 acres (0.81 ha)
- Built: 1917–1919
- Architectural style: Neoclassical
- MPS: Minnesota Hydroelectric Generating Facilities MPS
- NRHP reference No.: 91000243
- Designated NRHP: March 14, 1991

The Lake Zumbro Hydroelectric Generating Plant, also known as the City of Rochester Municipal Hydro-Electric Plant, is a hydroelectric facility on the Zumbro River in Mazeppa and Zumbro Townships in the U. S. State of Minnesota. The facility consists of a gravity dam and a powerhouse, and formerly included three houses for the plant operators. The houses were removed in the 1960s when the dam was retrofitted to allow remote operation of the generating equipment from Rochester. The impoundment created is called Lake Zumbro. This dam spans 904 feet (276 m) and is 66 feet (20 m) high, creating a reservoir with about 55 feet (17 m) of hydraulic head.

The idea of building a hydroelectric plant on the Zumbro River north of Rochester had been discussed at least as far back as 1904, when several entrepreneurs surveyed the river, going so far as to buy land for a dam site. An effort was made to secure funding for a 60-foot (18 m) dam and transmission line to enable sale of electricity to the city, but the city council declined the arrangement as they did not feel that Rochester's power consumption would justify it. In 1915, a bond issue for a new hydroelectric plant was put before the city council, possibly spurred by the recent loss of the coal-fired municipal power plant in a fire. Voters overwhelmingly approved a $360,000 (equivalent to $9,046,753 in 2025) bond issue in a special election held in January, 1916.

The facility was designed by pioneering hydroelectric engineer Hugh Lincoln Cooper (1865–1937), a Minnesota native with strong ties to the city of Rochester, and was built from 1917 to 1919. It is still operated by its original owner, Rochester Public Utilities (RPU), to supply power to Rochester, Minnesota, 15 miles (24 km) to the south. The Lake Zumbro Hydroelectric Generating Plant was listed on the National Register of Historic Places in 1991 for its state-level significance in the theme of engineering. It was nominated as a representative work of Cooper—one of the nation's leading hydroelectric engineers in the early 20th century—and his only project in his home state of Minnesota.

On the night of August 24, 2019, a pontoon boat with three people on board went over the dam. They were casting off from the lake shore after patronizing a business below the dam but got caught on the lip of the spillway. A fourth person jumped off and swam to a buoy, where she yelled for help, while the other three went over the edge in the boat. It lodged right-side-up near the base of the dam, causing the people on board only minor injuries. Firefighters, sheriff's deputies, and civilian boaters rescued all four individuals. The Wabasha County Sheriff's Office ascribed the incident to alcohol and darkness, charging the driver with boating while intoxicated.

== See also ==
- List of dams and reservoirs in Minnesota
- National Register of Historic Places listings in Wabasha County, Minnesota
