= Dayton Hollow Dam =

- Interactive map of Dayton Hollow Dam
- Coordinates: 46°13′51″N 96°07′03″W
- Purpose: Hydro Power; Fish & Wildlife Pond
- Status: In use
- Construction began: 1907
- Opening date: 1909
- Owner: Otter Tail Power Company

Dam and spillways
- Type of dam: Gravity dam
- Impounds: Otter Tail River
- Height (foundation): 41 ft (12 m)
- Length: 256 ft (78 m)
- Spillways: 1
- Spillway type: 7 controlled sluice gates
- Spillway capacity: 2,000 acre⋅ft (2,500 dam^{3})

Reservoir
- Creates: Dayton Hollow Reservoir
- Total capacity: 5,000 acre⋅ft (6,200 dam^{3})
- Catchment area: 1,810 mi^{2} (4,700 km^{2})
- Normal elevation: 1,073 ft (327 m)

Power Station
- Type: Conventional
- Hydraulic head: 36 ft (11 m)
- Turbines: 3
- Installed capacity: 1.0 MW

Dayton Hollow Dam is a hydroelectric gravity dam on the Otter Tail River in Otter Tail County, Minnesota in the United States. It is located 5 miles southwest of the city of Fergus Falls. Completed in 1909, it is the first power plant built by the Otter Tail Power Company and is one of five dams on the river. Together, they produce about 3.5 megawatts of power.

Shortly after becoming operational, Dayton Hollow Dam narrowly avoided destruction. The city-owned Fergus Falls City Light Station, several miles upstream, abruptly failed in the early hours of September 24, 1909. Three other dams between the disaster site and Dayton Hollow were swept away and a fourth (Central / Wright) was badly damaged. Otter Tail Power Company president Vernon Wright received enough advance warning to reach his dam by 6:15 am and open the spillway. The only flood recorded in the history of the river was due to this disaster.

The license for the hydroelectric plant expires on November 30, 2021. In June 2016 the company filed a pre-application with the Federal Energy Regulatory Commission to re-license the station with no changes to existing facilities or operations. The process will take 5 years.
