= Mazeppa Township, Wabasha County, Minnesota =

Mazeppa Township, Minnesota
- Township
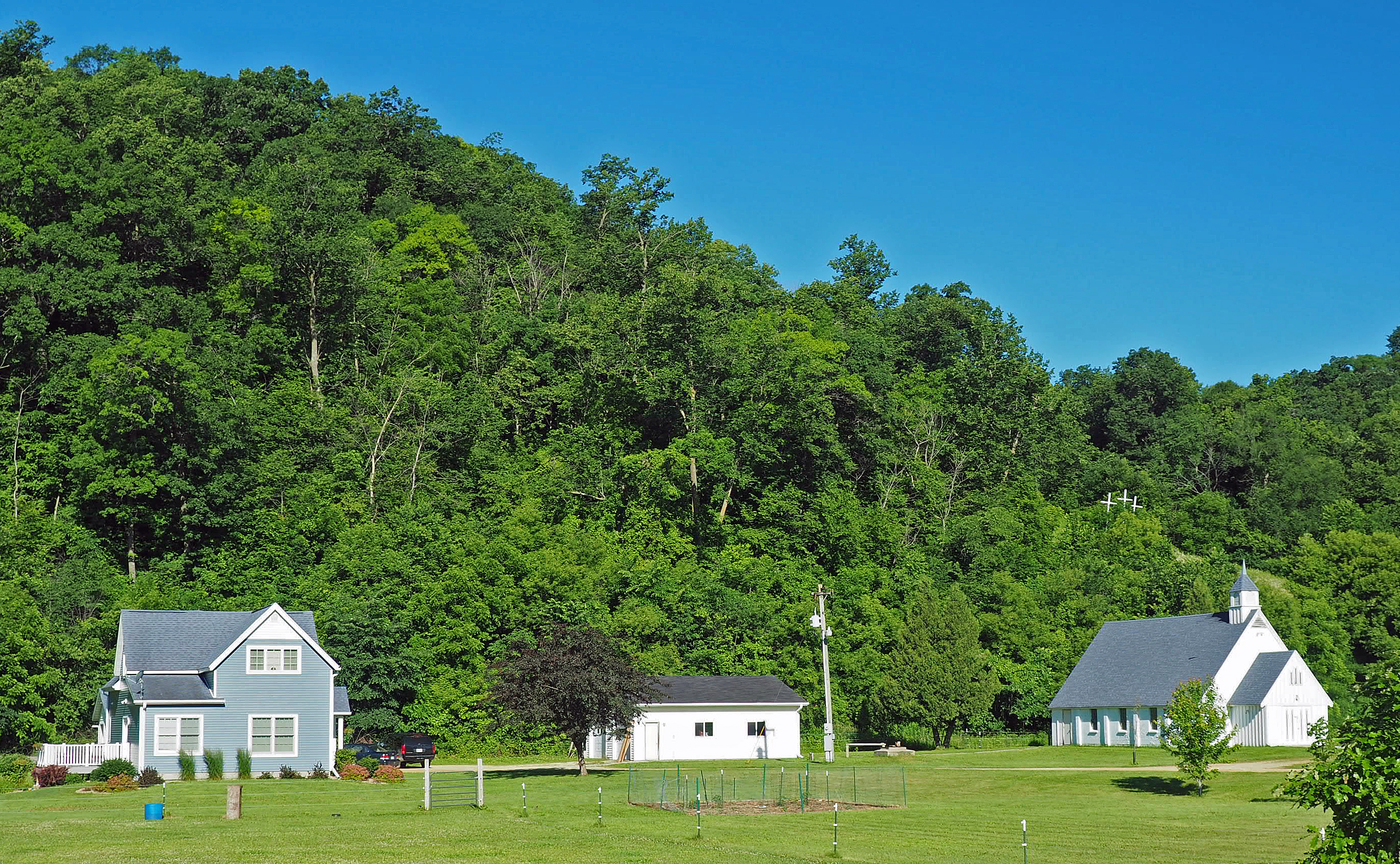
- A house and chapel in Mazeppa Township

- Location within the state of Minnesota Mazeppa Township, Minnesota (the United States)
- Coordinates: 44°13′50″N 92°29′57″W
- Country: United States
- State: Minnesota
- County: Wabasha

Area
  - Total: 22.3 sq mi (57.7 km^{2})
  - Land: 21.8 sq mi (56.5 km^{2})
  - Water: 0.50 sq mi (1.3 km^{2})
- Elevation: 961 ft (293 m)

Population (2000)
  - Total: 743
  - Density: 34/sq mi (13.2/km^{2})
- Time zone: UTC-6 (Central (CST))
  - Summer (DST): UTC-5 (CDT)
- ZIP code: 55956
- Area code: 507
- FIPS code: 27-41300
- GNIS feature ID: 0664940

Mazeppa Township is a township in Wabasha County, Minnesota, United States. The population was 743 at the 2000 census. Mazeppa Township was organized in 1858 and named in honor of Ivan Mazepa, a 17th-century Cossack chief popularized by Lord Byron's poem "Mazeppa".

== Geography ==
According to the United States Census Bureau, the township has a total area of 22.3 square miles (57.7 km^{2}); 21.8 square miles (56.5 km^{2}) of it is land and 0.5 square miles (1.3 km^{2}) of it (2.24%) is water. The township has one property listed on the National Register of Historic Places: the Lake Zumbro Hydroelectric Generating Plant, built 1917–1919.

== Demographics ==
As of the census of 2000, there were 743 people, 252 households, and 210 families residing in the township. The population density was 34.1 inhabitants per square mile (13.2/km^{2}). There were 273 housing units at an average density of 12.5 per square mile (4.8/km^{2}). The racial makeup of the township was 97.98% White, 1.08% African American, 0.27% Asian, and 0.67% from two or more races. Hispanic or Latino of any race were 0.27% of the population.

There were 252 households, out of which 40.1% had children under the age of 18 living with them, 73.0% were married couples living together, 6.0% had a female householder with no husband present, and 16.3% were non-families. 14.3% of all households were made up of individuals, and 5.2% had someone living alone who was 65 years of age or older. The average household size was 2.95 and the average family size was 3.25.

In the township the population was spread out, with 31.2% under the age of 18, 5.4% from 18 to 24, 28.5% from 25 to 44, 25.8% from 45 to 64, and 9.0% who were 65 years of age or older. The median age was 38 years. For every 100 females, there were 101.9 males. For every 100 females age 18 and over, there were 107.7 males.

The median income for a household in the township was $54,554, and the median income for a family was $59,821. Males had a median income of $37,500 versus $30,577 for females. The per capita income for the township was $21,390. About 2.3% of families and 4.5% of the population were below the poverty line, including 5.3% of those under age 18 and none of those age 65 or over.
