= Winnibigoshish Lake Dam =

Dam in Minnesota, U.S.

- U.S. National Register of Historic Places
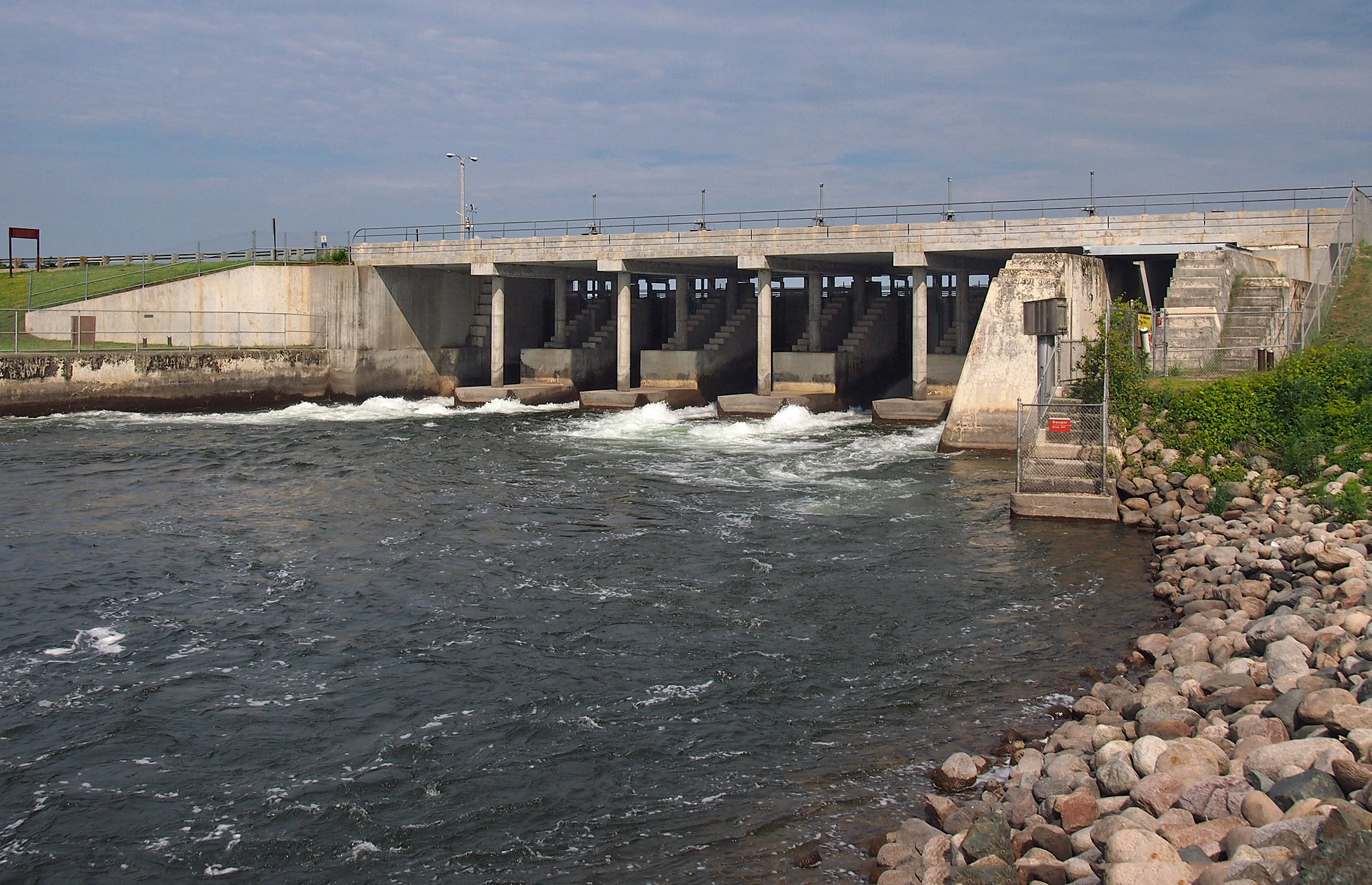
- The Winnibigoshish Lake Dam viewed from the southeast

- Location within Minnesota Location within the United States
- Location: Cass / Itasca counties, Minnesota
- Nearest city: Deer River, Minnesota
- Coordinates: 47°25′44.5″N 94°3′6.8″W
- Built: 1899
- NRHP reference No.: 82004629
- Added to NRHP: May 11, 1982

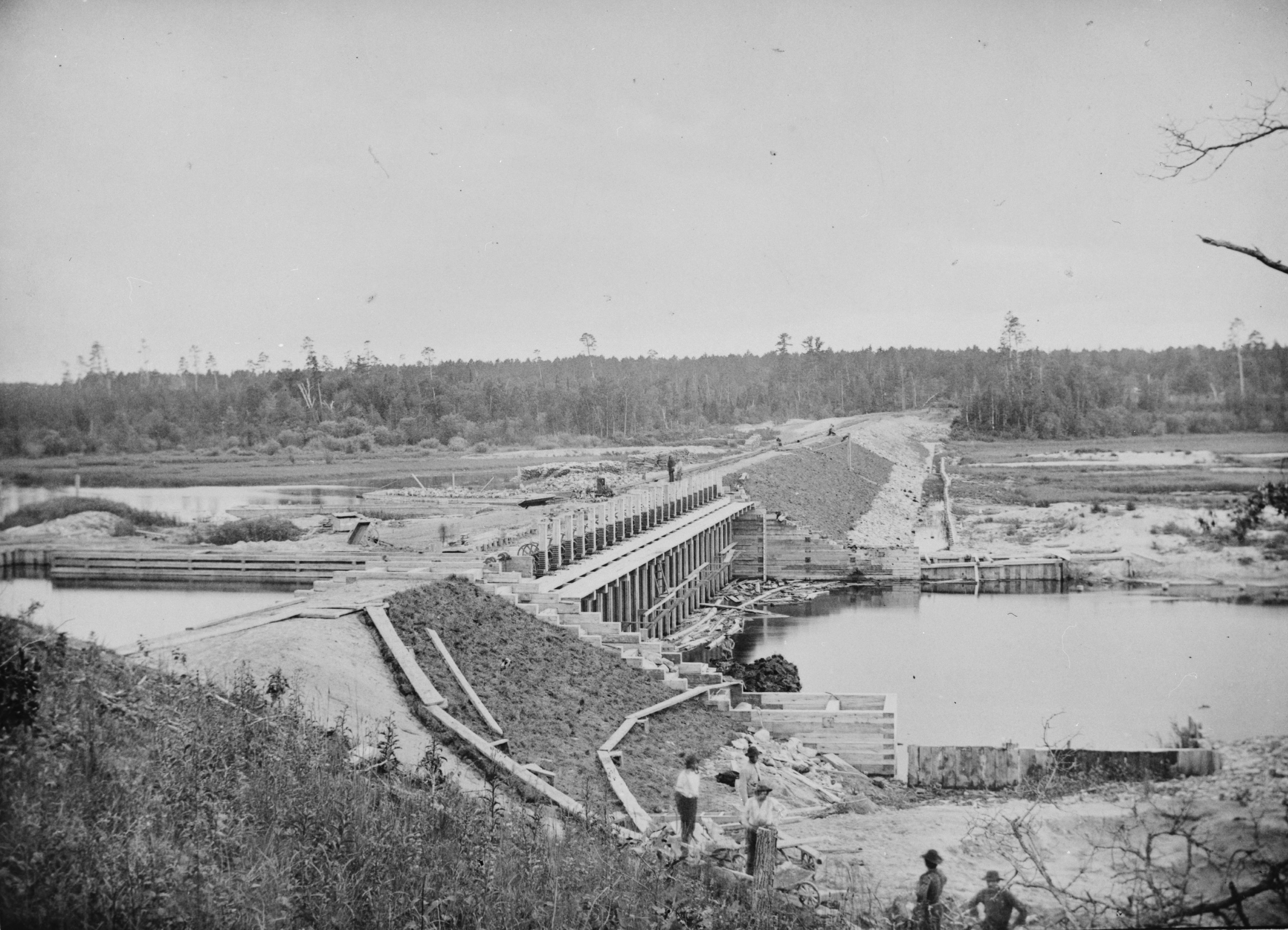
The original 1884 dam under construction

The Winnibigoshish Lake Dam is a dam at the outlet of Lake Winnibigoshish into the Mississippi River in Minnesota, United States. The dam crosses the county line between Cass County and Itasca County, and lies within the Leech Lake Indian Reservation. The first dam on the site was built by the United States Army Corps of Engineers from 1881 to 1884 to regulate the flow of water on the Upper Mississippi River. A constant flow was desired by loggers, fur traders, and millers downstream at St. Anthony Falls. The current structure was built in 1899. Lake Winnibigoshish is Minnesota's fifth largest lake, at 67,000 acres (270 km^{2}).

== Damage caused by the dam ==
At the time of the construction of the original dam, the region was inhabited almost exclusively by Ojibwa Indians, who had lived on the shores of this part of the river for many generations, as documented by the explorer, Henry Schoolcraft. The U.S. Army Corps of Engineers used 2,000,000 board-feet (4720 cubic meters) of pine for the dam and related buildings, wiping out large sections of conifer forests. Along the shores were the Ojibwa's hay fields, maple trees, gardens, cranberry marshes, wild rice marshes, villages, and burial mounds. A staple in their diet was fish, which they caught with nets placed in the swift and shallow river current. Construction of the dam raised the water level by 14 feet (4.3 m), not only obliterating the natives' homes and history, but also wiping out their fisheries. Recent archeological research has shown that the burial mounds and ceramic fragments dated from 700–1000 ce. The construction of this dam was a significant milestone in the historical record of white, Western European settlers, Christian missionaries, and commercial interests eradicating the indigenous population from most of Minnesota.

== Replacement dam ==
The 1899 dam, which is in the National Register of Historic Places, replaced the 1884 dam, substituting concrete for wooden components. By the 1920s, Minnesotans were flocking to the area in search of pristine camping, fishing, and hunting grounds. The Northlands Camp built a hotel, cabins, and a store for the throngs of tourists. Today, scores of locks and dams effectively control the water level on the Upper Mississippi River, aiding navigation and averting most adverse flooding, and the tourism continues to be a significant contributor to the region's economy.

== See also ==
- List of dams and reservoirs in Minnesota
