= Pokegama Lake (Minnesota) =

Lake in the state of Minnesota, United States

- Bakegamaa-zaaga'igan (Ojibwe)
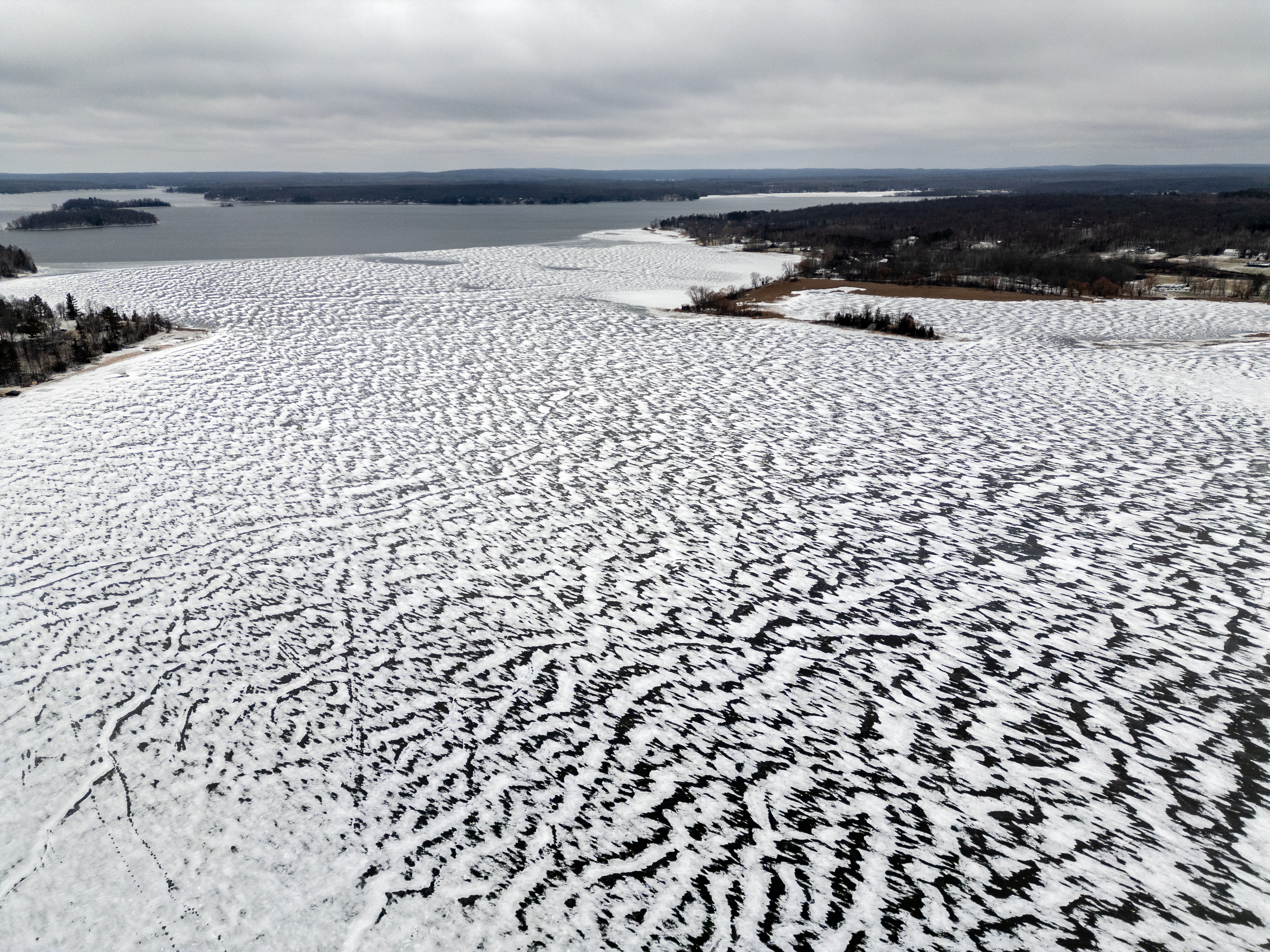
- Pokegama Lake in Grand Rapids

- Location within Minnesota
- Location: Pine County, Minnesota
- Coordinates: 45°50′24″N 93°2′24″W
- Type: lake

Pokegama Lake is the name used for two lakes in the U.S. state of Minnesota.

One is located near Grand Rapids in Itasca County. The lake was made into a reservoir by the construction of the Pokegama Lake Dam on the Mississippi River in Cohasset, Minnesota. The other Pokegama is located near Pine City in Pine County.

Pokegama is a name derived from the Ojibwe language Bakegamaa meaning "the water which juts off from another water," which describes the lake's connection to its near-by river: to the Snake River in Pine County, and to the Mississippi River in Itasca County.

== See also ==
- List of lakes in Minnesota
