= Brainerd Dam =

Dam in Minnesota, U.S.

Coordinates: 46°22′41″N 94°11′00″W

- Interactive map of Brainerd Dam
- Country: United States
- Location: Brainerd, Minnesota
- Status: Operational
- Opening date: 1888

Brainerd Dam is a dam across the Mississippi River in the city of Brainerd, Minnesota, United States. It forms the back-waters known as Rice Lake.

In June 2014, the city of Brainerd purchased the dam formerly operated by Wausau Paper.

Location: River Mile 1003.7
County: Crow Wing
Structure type: Concrete structure
Structure width: 451 feet (estimated)
River elevation (pool): 1,174 feet
River elevation (outflow): 1,152 feet
Water fall: 22 feet
Date built: 1888

Next dam upstream	Mississippi River	Next dam downstream
Grand Rapids Dam	Brainerd Dam	Little Falls Dam
