= Otter Tail Lake =

Lake in Minnesota, United States

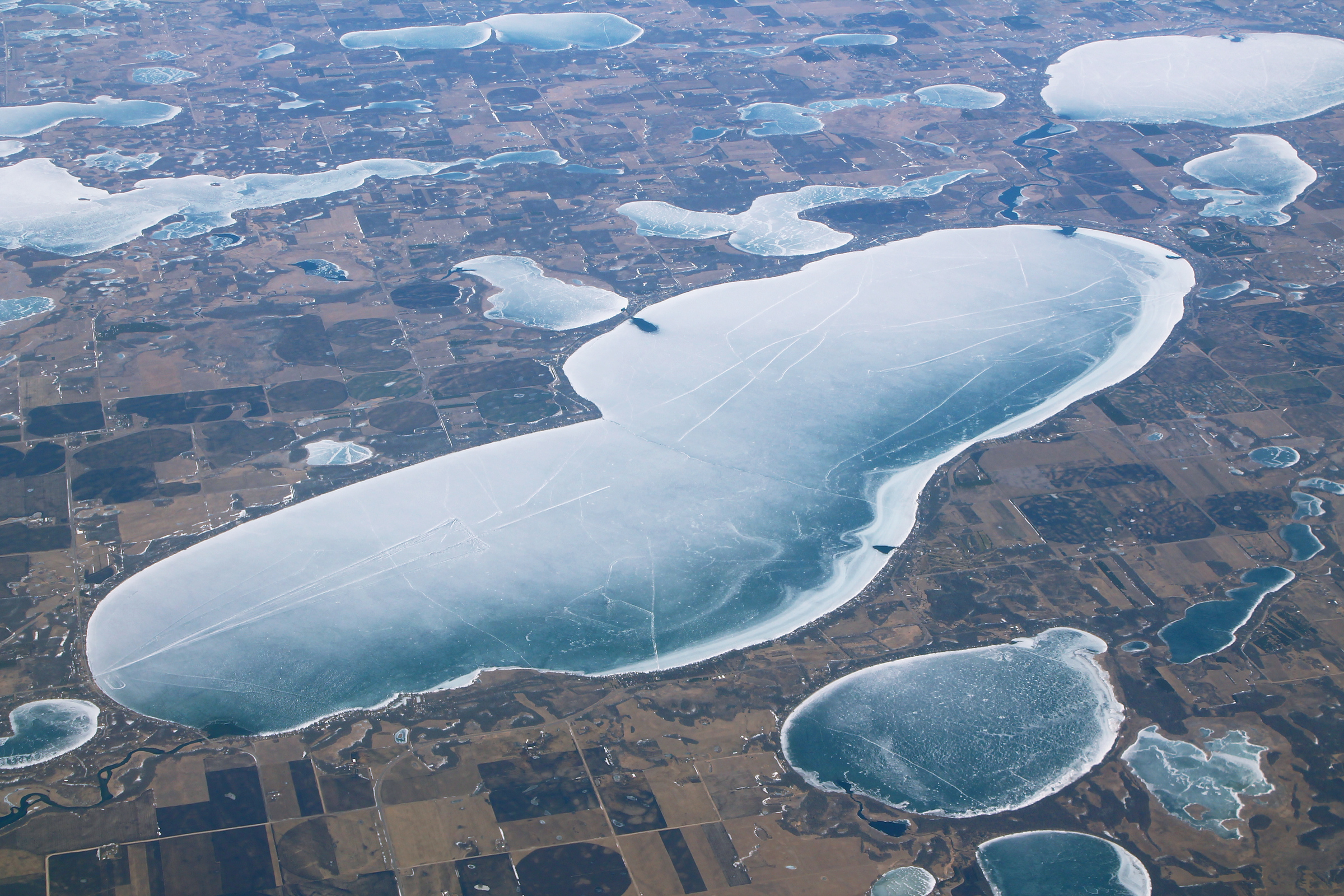
- Aerial view of the frozen Otter Tail Lake

- Location within Minnesota Location within the United States
- Location: Otter Tail County, Minnesota, United States
- Coordinates: 46°24′1.45″N 95°39′46.65″W
- Primary inflows: Otter Tail River, Dead River
- Primary outflows: Otter Tail River
- Basin countries: United States
- Surface area: 21 sq mi (54 km^{2})
- Max. depth: 120 ft (37 m)
- Settlements: Ottertail, Minnesota

Otter Tail Lake is a 21-square-mile (54 km^{2}) lake in the west-central part of the U.S. state of Minnesota and is the largest lake in Otter Tail County.

== Geography ==
Adjoining the city of Ottertail, it is a part of the Otter Tail River chain of lakes. Upstream from the lake are Big Pine, Little Pine and Rush lakes, while downstream are East Lost, West Lost and Deer lakes. Lake Blanche (Minnesota) also flows into Otter Tail Lake. The maximum depth is 120 feet (37 m), but 57% of the lake is 15 feet (4.6 m) deep or less. The shore of the lake and at least the shallower areas are composed of sand and gravel. The water clarity is 10.5 feet (3.2 m), which is considered good. A prominent feature of Otter Tail is the "point" which essentially divides the lake into eastern and western halves. The lake's main feature, however, is a long peninsula that follows the east shore of the lake. This peninsula reminded the Ojibwe people that originally lived in the area of a river otter's tail, and named the lake (and river) accordingly.

Otter Tail lake is ringed with a tall, mostly deciduous tree line. In general, the tree line goes back around 300 yards from the shore and acts as a windbreak, keeping the shoreline calm compared to the center of the lake.

The waters of Otter Tail Lake ultimately flow north into Hudson Bay through the Red River of the North.

At 13,725 acres it is the tenth largest lake completely within the borders of Minnesota.

== Recreation ==
It is a recreational destination, with the majority of its shores surrounded by residential and commercial development. The lake is known for fishing; walleye and Northern pike are most prevalent and the most sought after by anglers. The lake is also a popular destination for boating, power-boats and jet-skis, but also sailing. Because of the lake's large size, winds can pick up enough in the center of the lake for fairly challenging sailing. The heyday of sailing on the lake was the late 1960s through the mid-1980s, when the lake held annual sailing races. Especially popular at this time was the hobie cat.

Ottertail Lake is also the home of the Reel Country Classic, a two-day fishing tournament that has taken place every May since 2005.
