= Orwell Dam =

Coordinates: 46°13′03″N 96°10′44″W

- Interactive map of Orwell Dam
- Country: United States
- Location: Otter Tail County, Minnesota
- Status: Operational
- Opening date: 1953
- Designed by: United States Army Corps of Engineers,

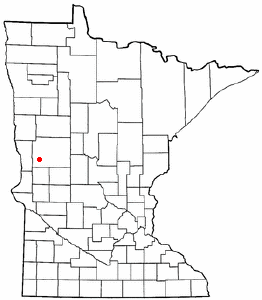
location of Fergus Falls, Minnesota and Orwell Dam

Orwell Dam (National ID # MN00574) is a dam in Otter Tail County, Minnesota, about six miles southwest of Fergus Falls.

The earthen gravity dam was constructed in 1953 by the United States Army Corps of Engineers, with a height of 60 feet and a length of 1355 feet at its crest. It impounds the Otter Tail River for flood control, irrigation water storage, and municipal drinking water. The dam is owned and operated by the St. Paul District, Mississippi Valley Division, Corps of Engineers.

The reservoir it creates, Orwell Lake, has a normal water surface of 1.3 square miles, with a maximum capacity of 20,600 acre-feet. Recreation includes hunting, boating, and fishing (for walleye, northern, crappie and redhorse sucker).
