= Blanchard Dam =

Dam in Minnesota, U.S.

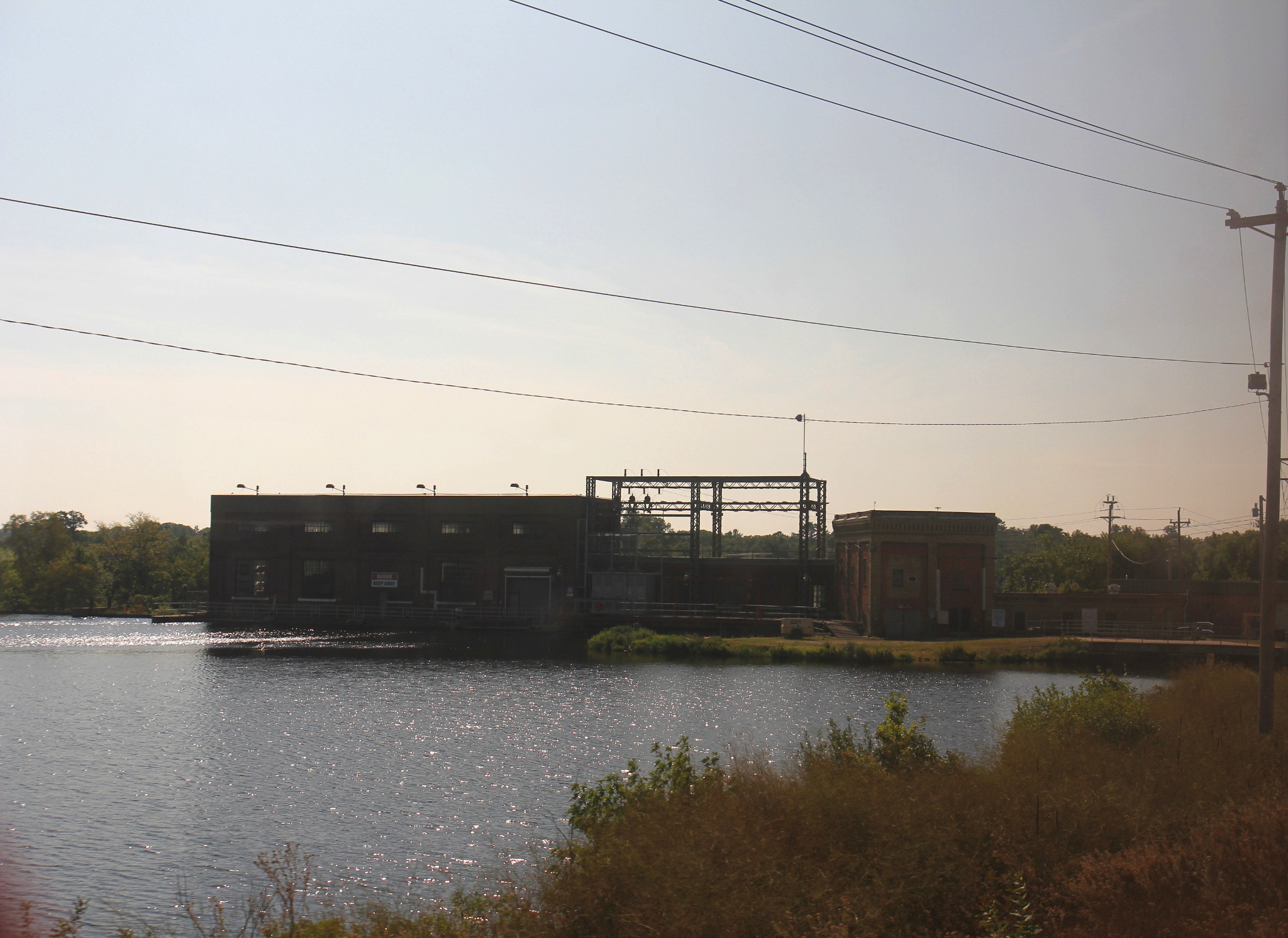
- The Blanchard Dam on Mississippi River
- Interactive map of Blanchard Dam
- Location: Morrison County, Minnesota, USA
- Coordinates: 45°51′38″N 94°21′36″W
- Opening date: 1925

Dam and spillways
- Impounds: Mississippi River
- Height: 46 ft

Blanchard Dam is a dam across the Mississippi River, in Bellevue Township and Swan River Township, Morrison County, near the city of Royalton, Minnesota. Blanchard is a hydroelectric station owned and operated by Minnesota Power. The dam sits slightly upriver from the former Soo Line rail bridge. The bridge now carries a recreational trail.

Blanchard Dam is the tallest dam on the Mississippi River at 47 feet of water head.

Because of its design, it provides the most accurate water flow statistics of the Mississippi in central Minnesota. Daily, monthly and yearly statistical data in cf/s (cubic feet per second) since 1924 are available at the United States Geological Survey website.

Blanchard Dam is also one of very few known places on earth where Staurolite is found. Here, the mineral Staurolite sometimes forms cross rocks or “fairy stones”. Blanchard Dam also has Camping and Fishing sites located within 200 yards of the dam. The Soo Line recreational trail crosses the river on a bridge located about 75 yards from the dam. The bridge is suspended about 100 ft above the Mississippi River. The original bridge remains and not been rebuilt since its use by the Soo Line Railroad.

Next dam upstream	Mississippi River	Next dam downstream
Little Falls Dam	Blanchard Dam	Sartell Dam
