= Little Falls Dam =

Dam in Minnesota, U.S.

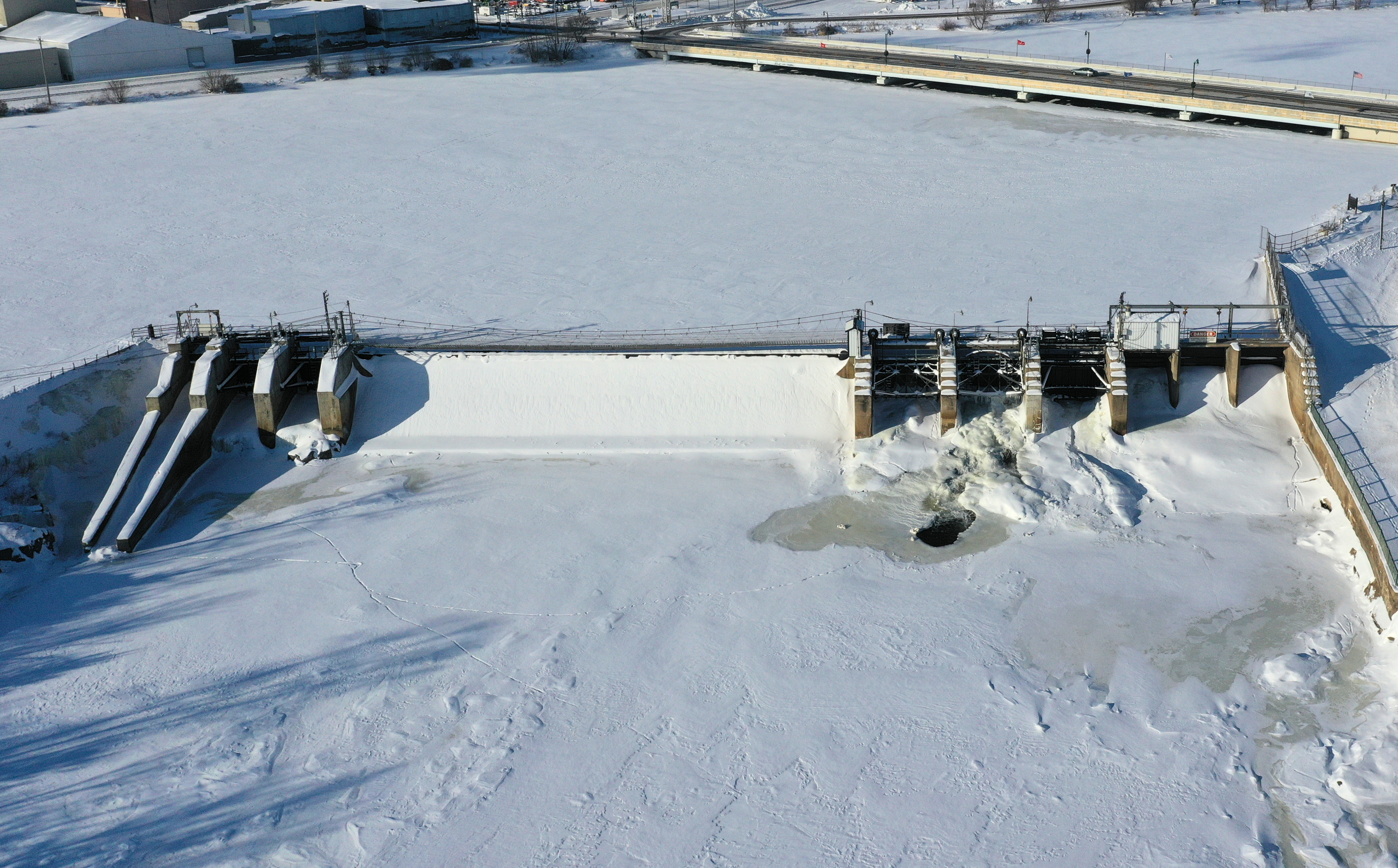
- Located just downriver from the Memorial Bridge in Little Falls
- Interactive map of Little Falls Dam
- Location: Little Falls, Minnesota, Minnesota, USA
- Coordinates: 45°58′30″N 94°22′07″W
- Construction began: 1887
- Opening date: 1888

Dam and spillways
- Impounds: Mississippi River
- Height: 24 ft (7.3 m)
- Length: 830 ft

Little Falls Dam is a hydroelectric dam across the Mississippi River in the city of Little Falls, Minnesota, United States.

== History ==
The Little Falls Mill and Land Company was formed in 1849 to build a dam and a sawmill to supply lumber for buildings at Fort Ripley; but when settlers showed up in the area there were other markets for the lumber. James Green, along with a group of co-partners, was the owner of the first dam, a wing dam built on the east channel of the falls. Green died in 1850 and the dam, mill and land were sold.

William Sturgis bought the dam and, with Calvin Tuttle and James Fergus, formed the Little Falls Company, later called Little Falls Manufacturing Company. The company built a larger dam, sawmill, cabinet shop and bridge and owned about 2,000 acres (8.1 km^{2}) of land. The new dam replaced the original wing dam, but was built on sand and portions of it were washed out by flood waters in the summer of 1859. The dam was repaired, but washed out again the following summer. The Little Falls Manufacturing Company faltered due to a number of factors, including "the ill effects of the economic depression that swept the frontier and ultimately the nation in the late 1850s." William Sturgis and James Fergus left their Little Falls business interests in the hands of their wives while they went west in search of gold. The story of this chapter in Little Falls history is told through letters written between James and his wife Pamelia in the book "The Gold Rush Widows of Little Falls" by Linda Peavy and Ursula Smith.

In 1887, a group of investors from Louisville, Kentucky formed the Little Falls Water Power Company. A new dam was completed in 1888 as a means to redevelop Little Falls, and this created jobs and attracted immigrants to the town. "Prior to the construction of the third dam, the 1880 census showed a population of 508 people in Little Falls. By 1890, the population more than quadrupled, reaching 2,354 people. By 1895, it had grown again, more than doubling to a total of 5,116. The dam, and the industries it attracted, was a major factor in that growth."

Construction of the fourth Little Falls dam, this one made of concrete, started with the east wing in 1914. Construction on the west wing was underway by 1918. The dam, including a new power house, was completed by 1921. The larger additional power house was built to house two additional generators, with a third generator being added during the 1980s. Further improvements were made from 2005 to 2010.

The new dam raised the water level an additional four and half feet. This submerged the water power mill at the mouth of the Little Elk River, about one mile upstream. Excavations below the power house increased the total water head to twenty-four feet. The original natural falls had a drop of only about five feet. The impounded water now reaches to the Belle Prairie Rapids, west of the Belle Prairie Church, about 3.5 miles upstream.

Along with the Blanchard Dam ten miles downstream, Little Falls Dam was purchased by Minnesota Power during the 1920s.

In 1978, automation for Blanchard, along with the Sylvan and Pillager dams on the Crow Wing River, were centralized in Little Falls; this allowed a staff of four to do work that had previously required sixteen operators. The operation has since been remotely controlled by Minnesota Power's central dispatchers in Riverton, and the dam is now staffed only by maintenance personnel.

Because generating electricity by water power has little overhead and no fuel costs, this relatively small 4.5 megawatt dam remains economically profitable.

Next dam upstream	Mississippi River	Next dam downstream
Brainerd Dam	Little Falls Dam	Blanchard Dam
