= Deer Lake (Itasca County, Minnesota) =

Lake in the state of Minnesota, United States

- Location within Minnesota
- Location: Itasca County, Minnesota
- Coordinates: 47.3750°N 93.6571°W
- Basin countries: United States
- Max. length: 5 mi (8 km)
- Max. width: 1.5 mi (2.4 km)
- Surface area: 4,156 acres (17 km^{2})
- Max. depth: 121 ft (37 m)
- Shore length^{1}: 22 mi (35 km)
- ^{1} Shore length is not a well-defined measure.

Deer Lake is located in Itasca County, Minnesota about 12 miles (19 km) north of Grand Rapids and about 8 miles (13 km) northeast of Deer River. The lake covers 4,156 acres (17 km^{2}) and is roughly 5 miles (8 km) long and 1.5 mi (2.4 km) wide.

Deer Lake is fed by three sources: rainfall, underwater springs, and one inlet from Little Deer Lake. It belongs to a chain of pristine lakes, feeding Bay Lake - headwaters of the mighty Deer River (namesake of the town) which feeds White Oak Lake (part of the Mississippi River). Otter, Moose, Little Moose, Fawn, and Cottonwood Lakes also feed Bay Lake.

Often called the "Lake of the Changing Colors", Deer Lake's crystal-clear water displays a wide range of magnificent colors on sunny days - divulging the locations of its perilous rocky bars to unfamiliar boaters. While Deer Lake ranks among the clearest lakes of Minnesota, what distinguishes it from its peers is its many interesting islands. In 1998, the DNR and Deer Lake Association jointly acquired Bear Island to preserve its undeveloped charm. Although bears are rarely (if ever) seen on the island, the presence of an inactive eagle's nest in a large white pine makes the island a popular destination for observing wildlife. Other notable islands include Battleship Island, Star (also known as Picnic) Island, and many others lacking agreed-upon names.

A plethora of wildlife make Deer Lake their abode. The lake's healthy fish population includes several species of muskie, northern pike, walleye, perch, bluegills, sunfish, rock bass, crappie, and largemouth and smallmouth bass. On its surface swim several happy loon families, a variety of ducks, and the Canada goose.

This is ranked as one of the clearest lakes located in Minnesota with a water clarity level of 16 feet (5 m).

Deer Lake is an English translation of the native Ojibwe-language name Waawaashkeshiwi-zaaga'igan, meaning "lake of the deer."
