= Pokegama Lake Dam =

Dam in Minnesota, U.S.

Coordinates: 47°15′03″N 93°35′15″W

not to be confused with Pokegama Lake, Pine County, Minnesota

Pokegama Lake Dam (National ID MN00584) is a dam in Cohasset, Itasca County, Minnesota, northwest of the city of Grand Rapids.

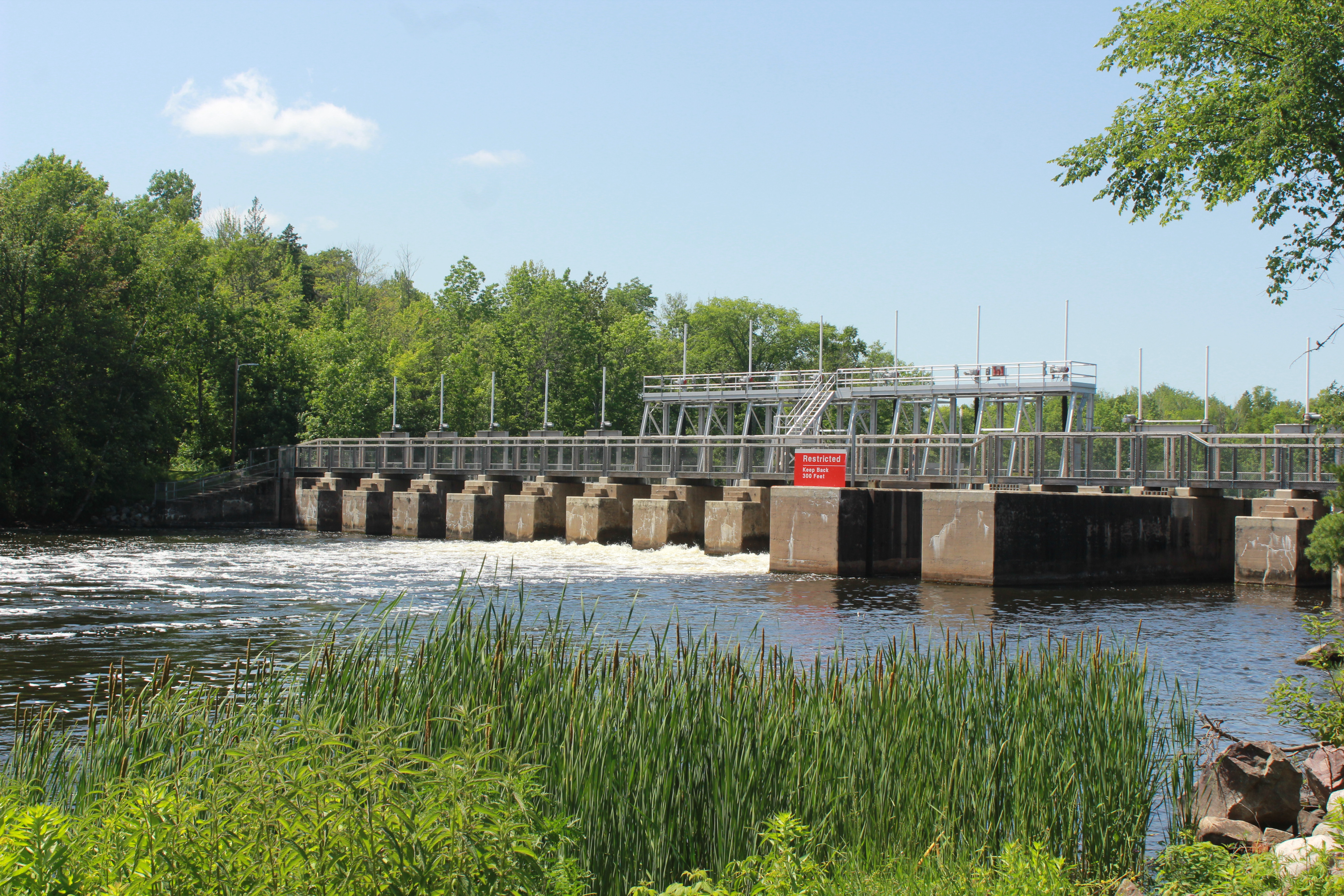
Pokegama Lake Dam

The concrete and timber crib dam was constructed in 1884 by the United States Army Corps of Engineers, with a height of 17 feet (5.2 m), and a length of 385 feet (117 m) at its crest. It impounds the Upper Mississippi River for flood control, navigation, and municipal drinking water. Rebuilt in 1936, the dam is owned and operated by the Mississippi Valley Division of the Corps of Engineers.

The dam creates a system of connected reservoirs with a total maximum capacity of 120,000 acre-feet, and a normal capacity of 82,000 acre-feet: Jay Gould Lake, Little Jay Gould Lake, Blackwater Lake, Cut-Off Lake, and the largest, Pokegama Lake. The dam is the location of a number of Minnesota weather records.

== Pedestrian bridge ==
During rehabilitation work in 2011, a new pedestrian bridge was constructed on the concrete footings on the downstream side of the dam, connecting the Pokegama Recreation Area Campground to the south side of the Mississippi River.

== See also ==
- List of crossings of the Upper Mississippi River

== Gallery ==
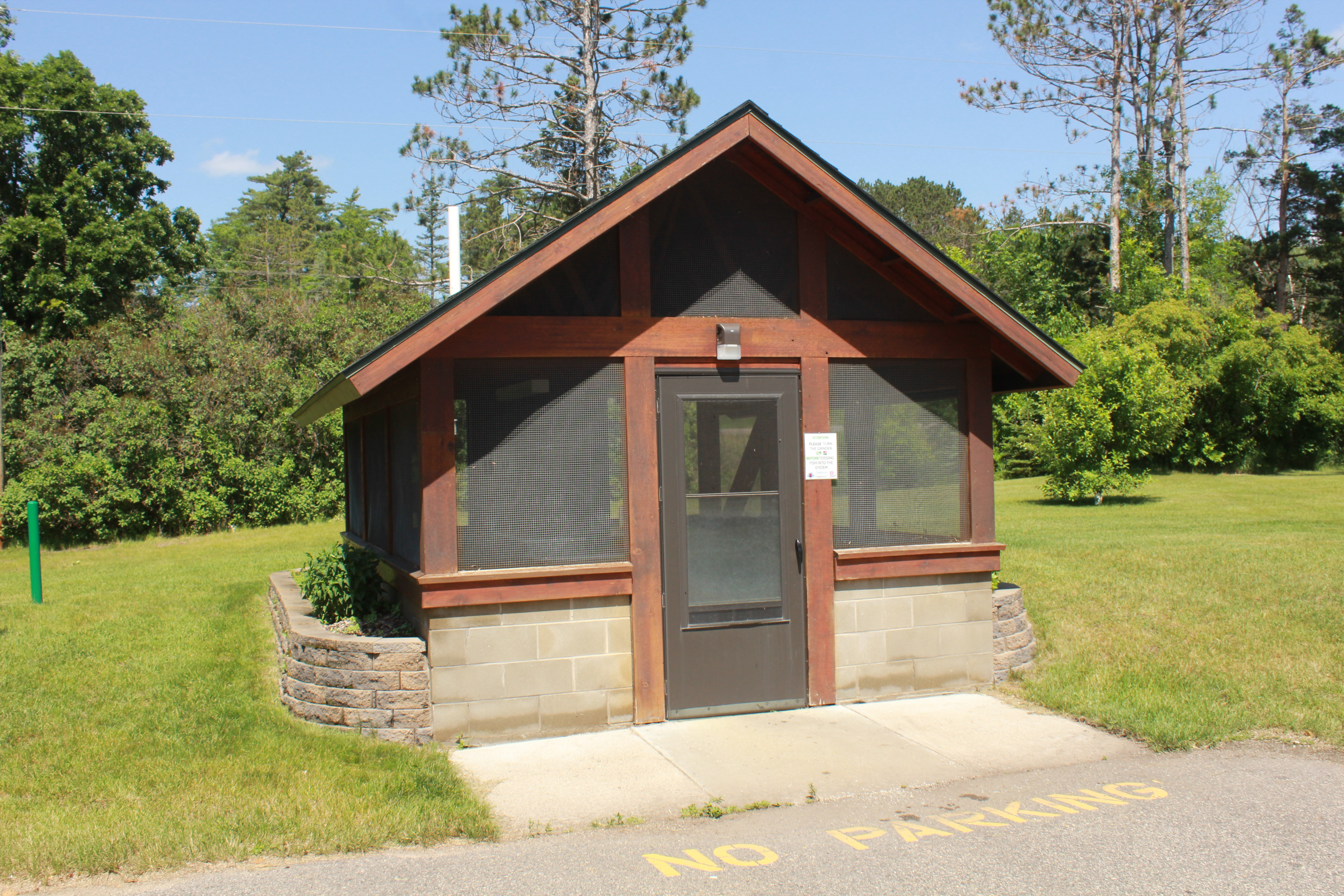
Fish cleaning station

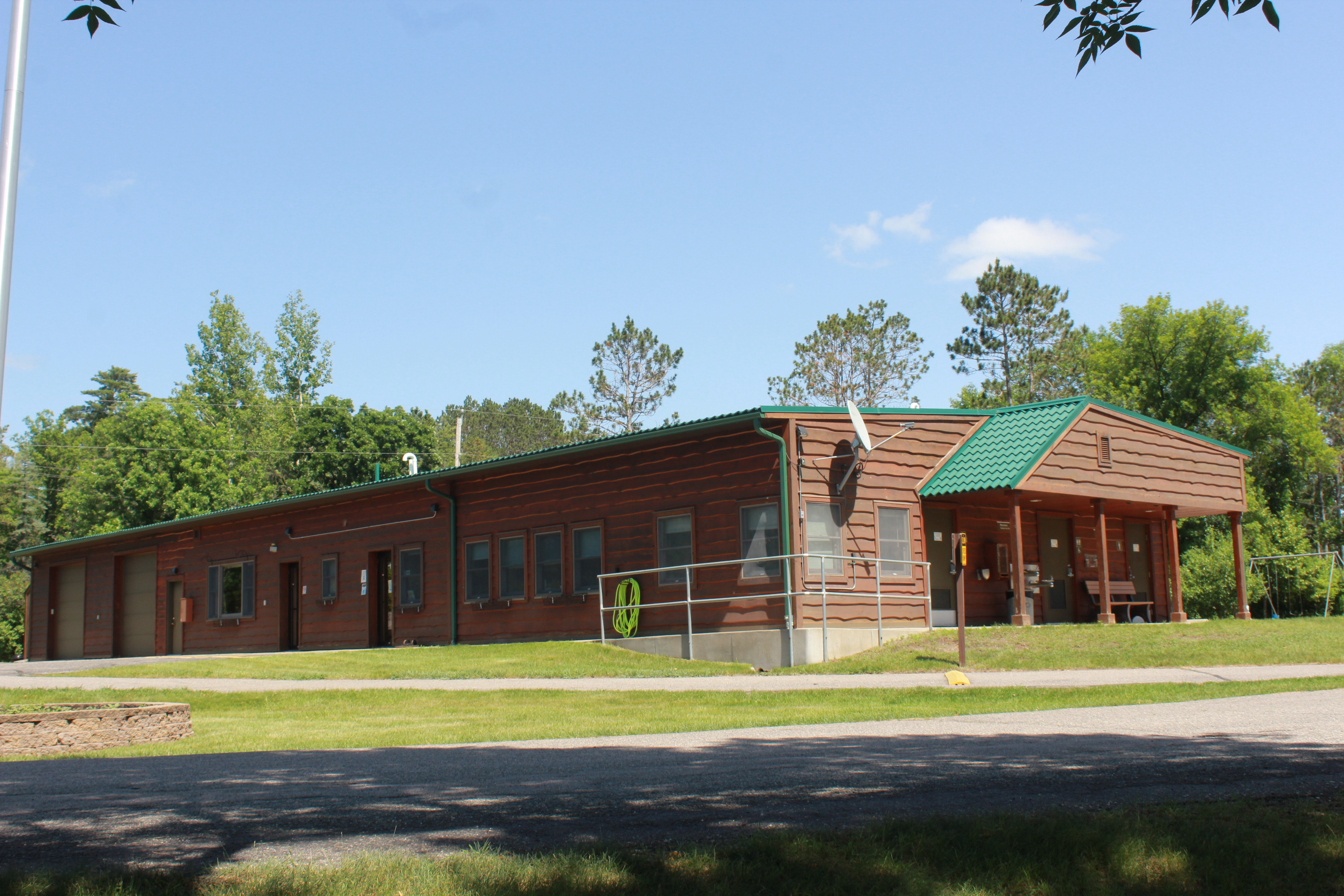
Office building with public restrooms and showers

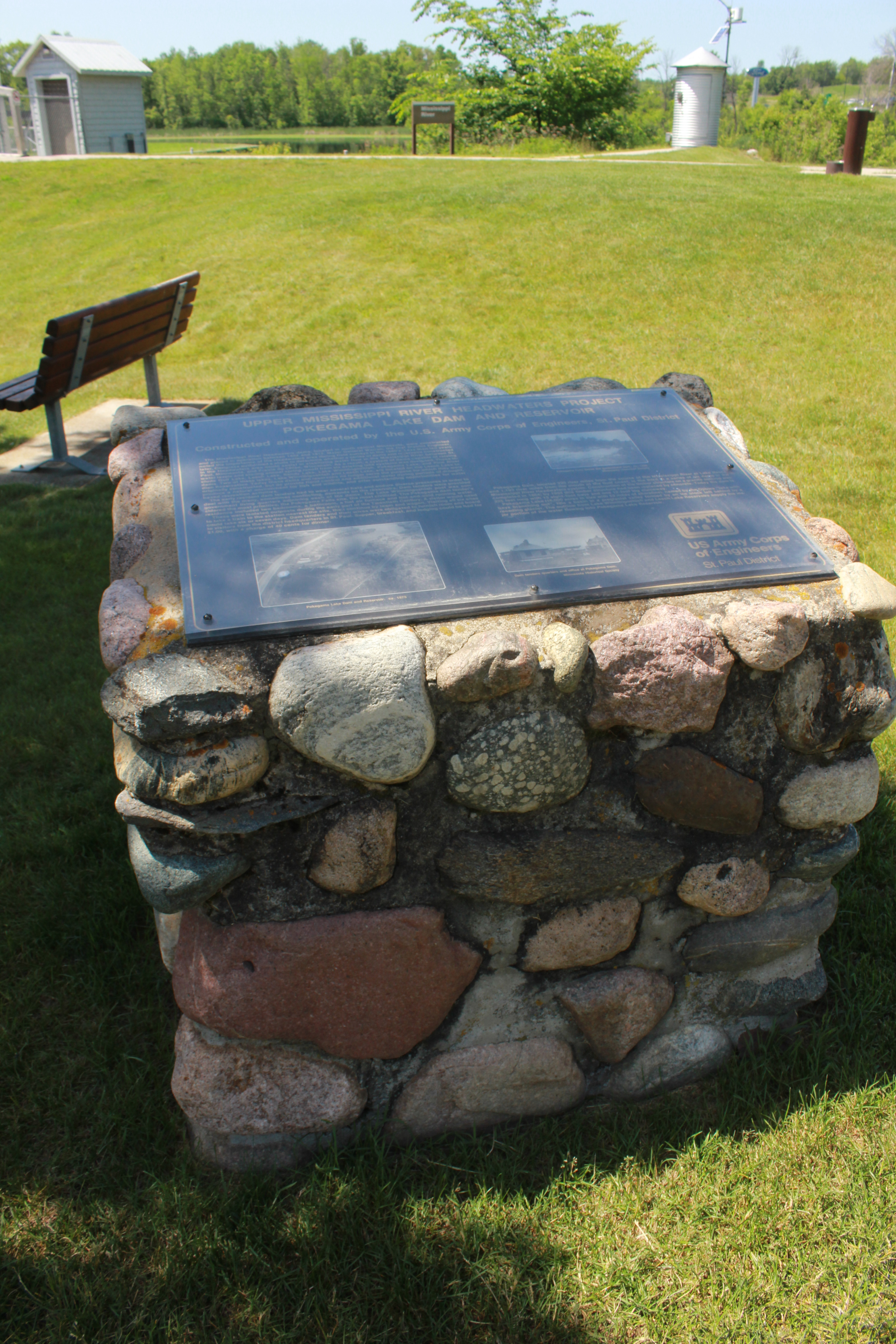
Interpretive signage

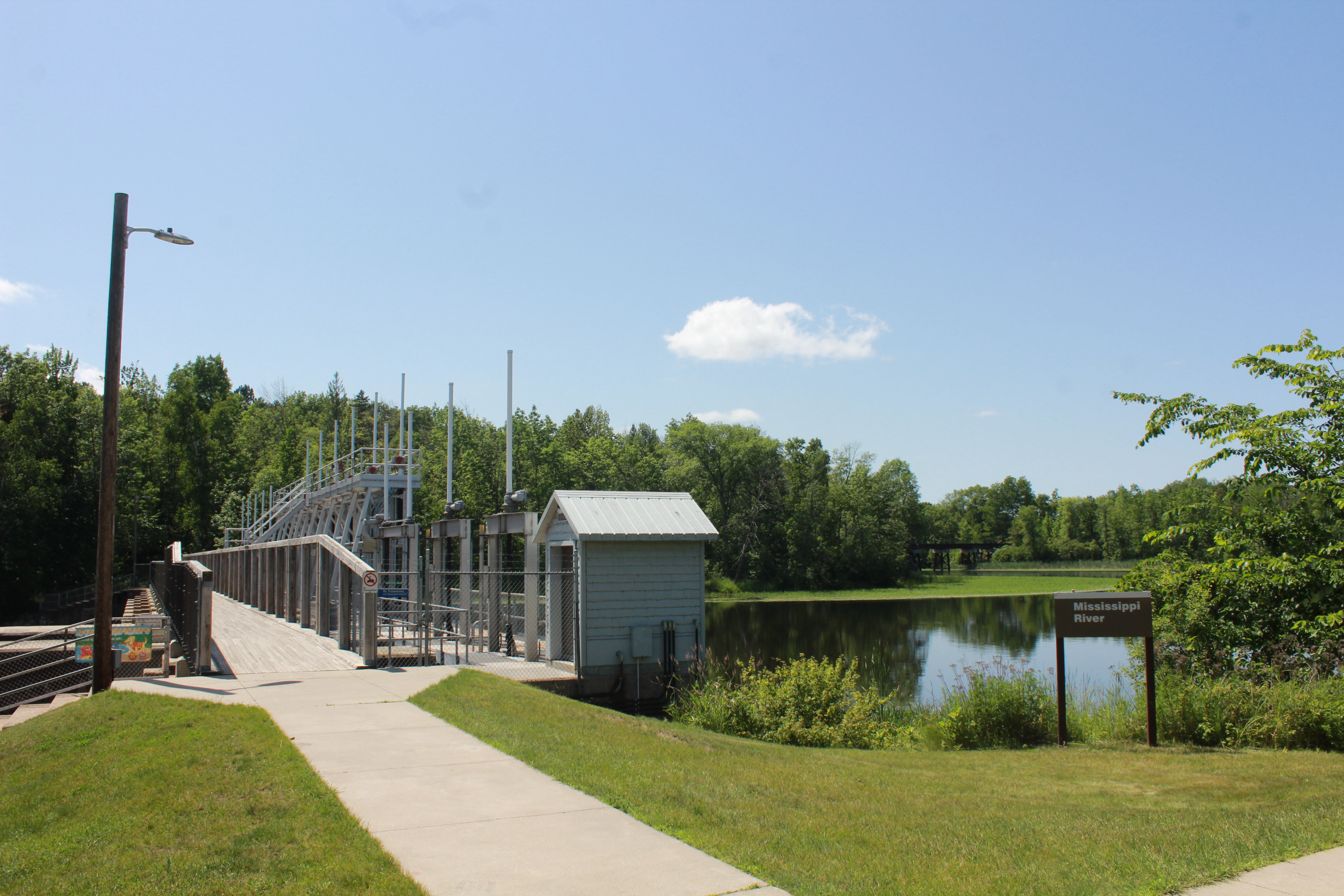
Walkway
