= Ottertail, Minnesota =

City in Minnesota, United States

Ottertail
- City
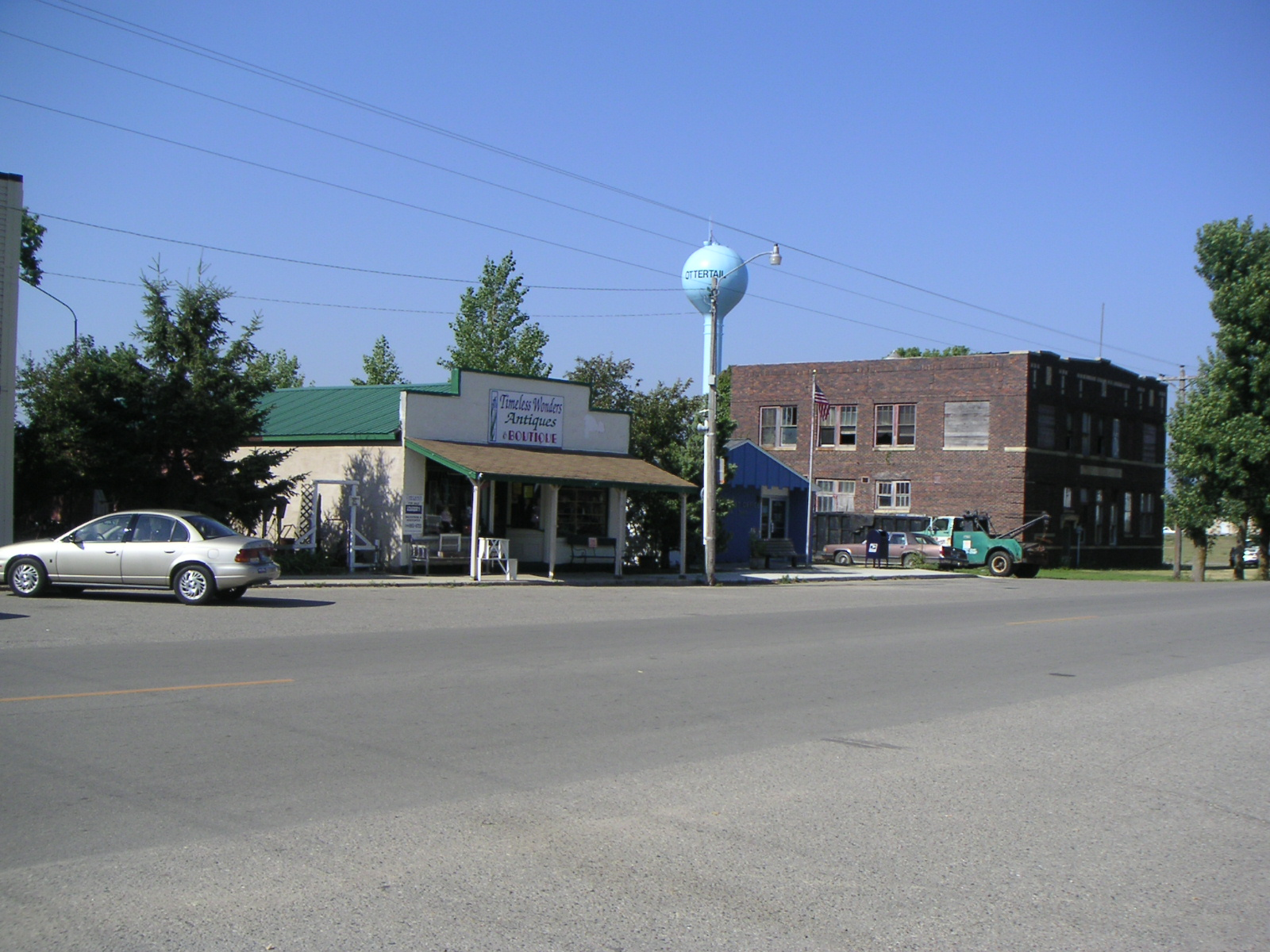
- Looking southwest along Main Street (State Hwy. 108)

- Location of Ottertail, Minnesota
- Coordinates: 46°25′36″N 95°33′49″W
- Country: United States
- State: Minnesota
- County: Otter Tail
- Founded: 1903

Area
  - Total: 5.97 sq mi (15.47 km^{2})
  - Land: 4.28 sq mi (11.08 km^{2})
  - Water: 1.69 sq mi (4.39 km^{2})
- Elevation: 1,355 ft (413 m)

Population (2020)
  - Total: 629
  - Estimate (2021): 656
  - Density: 147.1/sq mi (56.79/km^{2})
- Time zone: UTC-6 (CST)
  - Summer (DST): UTC-5 (CDT)
- ZIP code: 56571
- Area code: 218
- FIPS code: 27-49210
- GNIS feature ID: 2396107
- Website: cityofottertail.com

Ottertail is a city in Otter Tail County, Minnesota, United States. The population was 629 at the 2020 census.

== History ==
Ottertail was platted in 1903, and named for nearby Otter Tail Lake.

"Otter Tail" City appeared on the United States Census as early as 1860.

== Geography ==
According to the United States Census Bureau, the city has an area of 5.10 square miles (13.21 km^{2}), of which 4.28 square miles (11.09 km^{2}) is land and 0.82 square miles (2.12 km^{2}) is water.

Minnesota State Highways 78 and 108 are two of the main routes in the community.

=== Climate ===
Like the rest of Minnesota, Ottertail has a humid continental climate. It is above the line between the hot and cool summer types of the climate, which means the climate classification is Dfb on the Köppen climate classification. Winters are long and very cold and nights average subzero Fahrenheit. Summers are warm but frequently that weather gets broken up by convective rainfall.

Climate data for Ottertail, Minnesota, 1991–2020 normals, extremes 1961–present
Month	Jan	Feb	Mar	Apr	May	Jun	Jul	Aug	Sep	Oct	Nov	Dec	Year
Record high °F (°C)	56 (13)	59 (15)	73 (23)	94 (34)	94 (34)	98 (37)	102 (39)	101 (38)	97 (36)	91 (33)	72 (22)	57 (14)	102 (39)
Mean maximum °F (°C)	40.5 (4.7)	44.3 (6.8)	58.1 (14.5)	74.2 (23.4)	84.8 (29.3)	88.2 (31.2)	89.8 (32.1)	89.0 (31.7)	84.7 (29.3)	76.8 (24.9)	58.6 (14.8)	42.7 (5.9)	91.9 (33.3)
Mean daily maximum °F (°C)	17.4 (−8.1)	23.4 (−4.8)	35.9 (2.2)	51.6 (10.9)	64.8 (18.2)	74.5 (23.6)	78.6 (25.9)	77.3 (25.2)	68.9 (20.5)	53.8 (12.1)	36.6 (2.6)	23.4 (−4.8)	50.5 (10.3)
Daily mean °F (°C)	7.7 (−13.5)	12.5 (−10.8)	25.5 (−3.6)	40.6 (4.8)	54.5 (12.5)	65.1 (18.4)	69.4 (20.8)	68.0 (20.0)	58.9 (14.9)	44.6 (7.0)	29.0 (−1.7)	15.2 (−9.3)	40.9 (5.0)
Mean daily minimum °F (°C)	−2.0 (−18.9)	1.6 (−16.9)	15.1 (−9.4)	29.7 (−1.3)	44.2 (6.8)	55.8 (13.2)	60.2 (15.7)	58.7 (14.8)	49.0 (9.4)	35.4 (1.9)	21.3 (−5.9)	7.1 (−13.8)	31.3 (−0.4)
Mean minimum °F (°C)	−25.8 (−32.1)	−21.8 (−29.9)	−10.5 (−23.6)	14.6 (−9.7)	30.7 (−0.7)	43.6 (6.4)	50.4 (10.2)	48.8 (9.3)	35.7 (2.1)	22.7 (−5.2)	3.1 (−16.1)	−15.7 (−26.5)	−28.6 (−33.7)
Record low °F (°C)	−40 (−40)	−45 (−43)	−33 (−36)	−7 (−22)	18 (−8)	33 (1)	37 (3)	35 (2)	19 (−7)	10 (−12)	−21 (−29)	−38 (−39)	−45 (−43)
Average precipitation inches (mm)	0.62 (16)	0.62 (16)	1.24 (31)	2.23 (57)	3.43 (87)	4.76 (121)	4.27 (108)	3.29 (84)	3.16 (80)	2.69 (68)	1.07 (27)	0.79 (20)	28.17 (715)
Average precipitation days (≥ 0.01 in)	6.3	5.9	7.1	8.3	10.6	11.8	12.0	9.4	9.0	10.0	7.4	7.3	105.1
Source 1: NOAA
Source 2: National Weather Service

== Demographics ==
Historical population
Census	Pop.	Note	%±
1910	176		—
1920	223		26.7%
1930	221		−0.9%
1940	254		14.9%
1950	237		−6.7%
1960	164		−30.8%
1970	180		9.8%
1980	239		32.8%
1990	313		31.0%
2000	451		44.1%
2010	572		26.8%
2020	629		10.0%
2021 (est.)	656		4.3%
U.S. Decennial Census; 2020 Census

=== 2010 census ===
As of the census of 2010, there were 572 people, 245 households, and 171 families living in the city. The population density was 133.6 inhabitants per square mile (51.6/km^{2}). There were 401 housing units at an average density of 93.7 per square mile (36.2/km^{2}). The racial makeup of the city was 99.0% White, 0.2% Native American, and 0.9% from two or more races. Hispanic or Latino of any race were 0.9% of the population.

There were 245 households, of which 22.0% had children under the age of 18 living with them, 57.1% were married couples living together, 9.4% had a female householder with no husband present, 3.3% had a male householder with no wife present, and 30.2% were non-families. 24.9% of all households were made up of individuals, and 8.6% had someone living alone who was 65 years of age or older. The average household size was 2.33 and the average family size was 2.75.

The median age in the city was 47.7 years. 18.2% of residents were under the age of 18; 5.4% were between the ages of 18 and 24; 21.4% were from 25 to 44; 35.2% were from 45 to 64; and 19.6% were 65 years of age or older. The gender makeup of the city was 51.2% male and 48.8% female.

=== 2000 census ===
As of the census of 2000, there were 451 people, 190 households, and 133 families living in the city. The population density was 102.7 inhabitants per square mile (39.7/km^{2}). There were 323 housing units at an average density of 73.6 per square mile (28.4/km^{2}). The racial makeup of the city was 99.56% White and 0.44% Native American. 42.8% were of German, 23.7% Norwegian and 7.7% Swedish ancestry.

There were 190 households, out of which 27.9% had children under the age of 18 living with them, 63.2% were married couples living together, 3.7% had a female householder with no husband present, and 29.5% were non-families. 24.2% of all households were made up of individuals, and 9.5% had someone living alone who was 65 years of age or older. The average household size was 2.37 and the average family size was 2.82.

In the city, the population was spread out, with 21.1% under the age of 18, 7.3% from 18 to 24, 24.2% from 25 to 44, 32.6% from 45 to 64, and 14.9% who were 65 years of age or older. The median age was 43 years. For every 100 females, there were 115.8 males. For every 100 females age 18 and over, there were 105.8 males.

The median income for a household in the city was $32,188, and the median income for a family was $43,750. Males had a median income of $23,750 versus $18,438 for females. The per capita income for the city was $18,612. About 10.2% of families and 12.7% of the population were below the poverty line, including 21.8% of those under age 18 and 4.1% of those age 65 or over.
