= Otter Tail River =

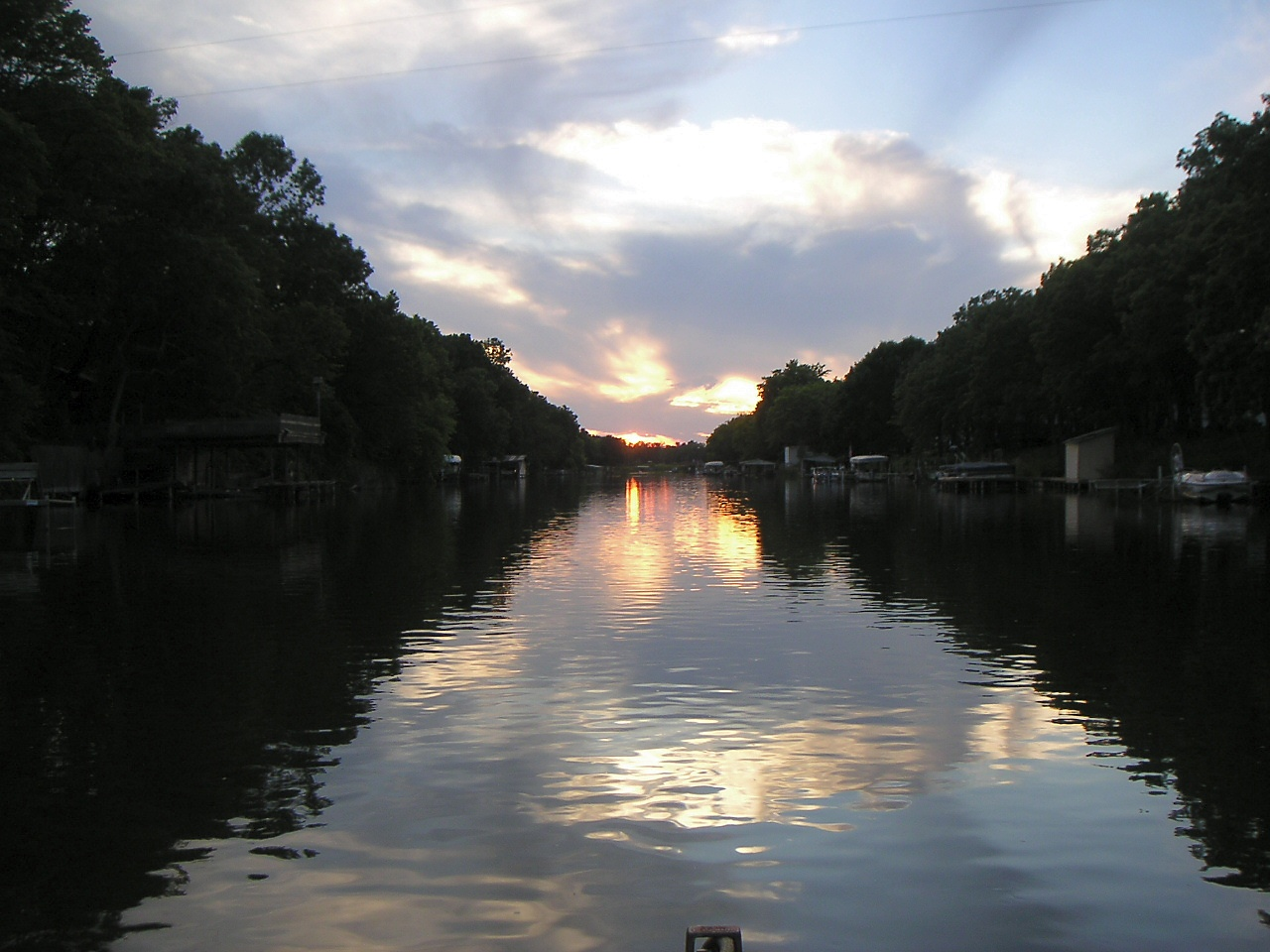
- Sunset on the Otter Tail River near Otter Tail Lake and Ottertail, Minnesota

- Mouth of the Otter Tail River
- Native name: Nigigwaanowe-ziibi (Ojibwe)

Location
- Country: United States
- State: Minnesota
- Counties: Wilkin, Otter Tail, Becker

Physical characteristics
- Source
  - location: Round Lake
  - coordinates: 47°01′39″N 95°32′40″W
  - elevation: 1,494 feet (455 m)
- Mouth: Red River of the North
  - coordinates: 46°15′51″N 96°35′52″W
  - elevation: 951 feet (290 m)
- Length: 192 mi-long (309 km)

The Otter Tail River (Ojibwe: Nigigwaanowe-ziibi) is a 192-mile-long (309 km) river in the west-central portion of the U.S. state of Minnesota. It begins in Becker County, 40 miles (64 km) southwest of Bemidji. It then flows through a number of lakes and cities in Minnesota, including Many Point Lake, Chippewa Lake, Height of Land Lake, Frazee, the Pine lakes, Rush Lake, Otter Tail Lake and Ottertail, West Lost Lake, Fergus Falls, and Orwell Lake.

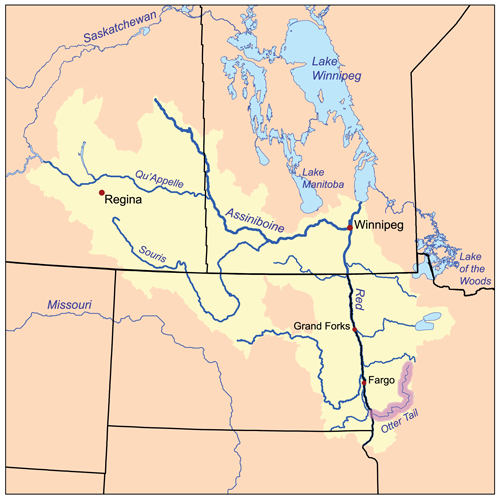
The Red River drainage basin, with the Otter Tail River highlighted

At its mouth, it joins with the Bois de Sioux River to form the Red River between Breckenridge, Minnesota and Wahpeton, North Dakota. The Red River is the Minnesota–North Dakota boundary from this point onward to the Canada–United States border. Waters of the Red River watershed ultimately flow north into Hudson Bay.

Between 1909 and 1925, the privately owned Otter Tail Power Company built five dams on the Otter Tail River. They are Dayton Hollow (1909), Hoot Lake (1914), Pisgah (1918), Central / Wright (built 1871, rebuilt 1922), and Taplin Gorge (1925).

The Otter Tail River is the third longest river totally within the state of Minnesota and the ninth longest river that flows for some portion through the state.

== Gallery ==
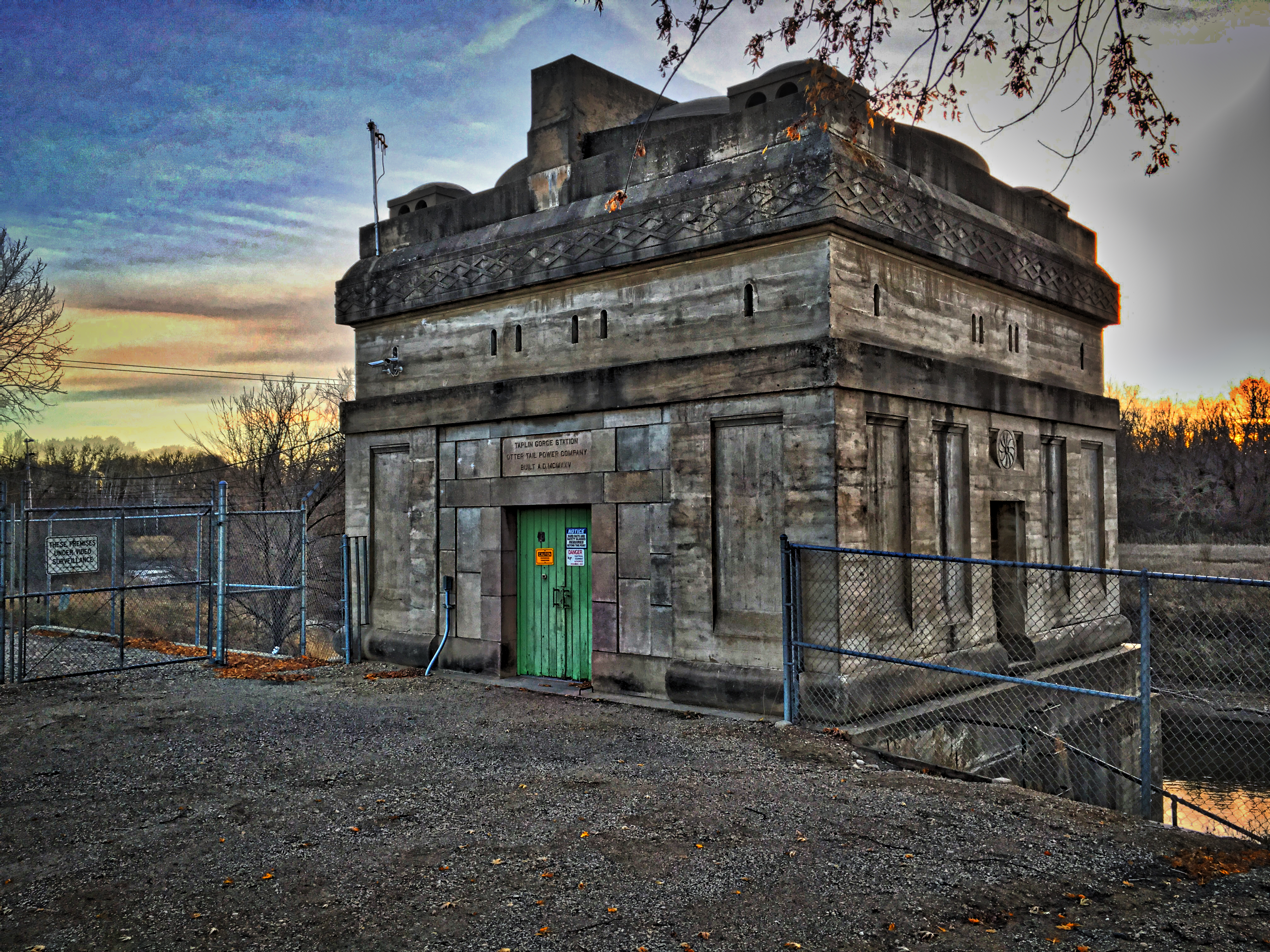
Taplin George Dam

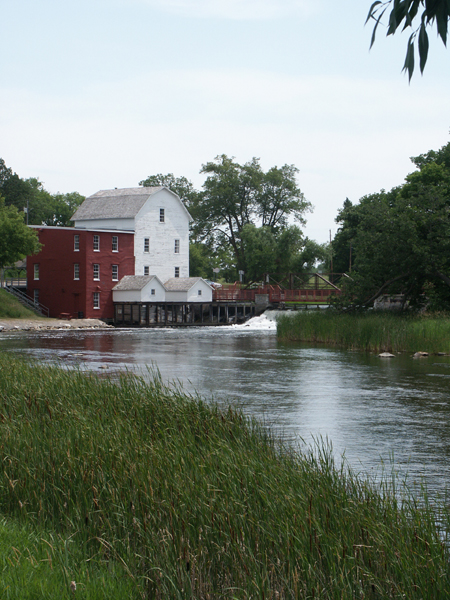
Phelps Mill

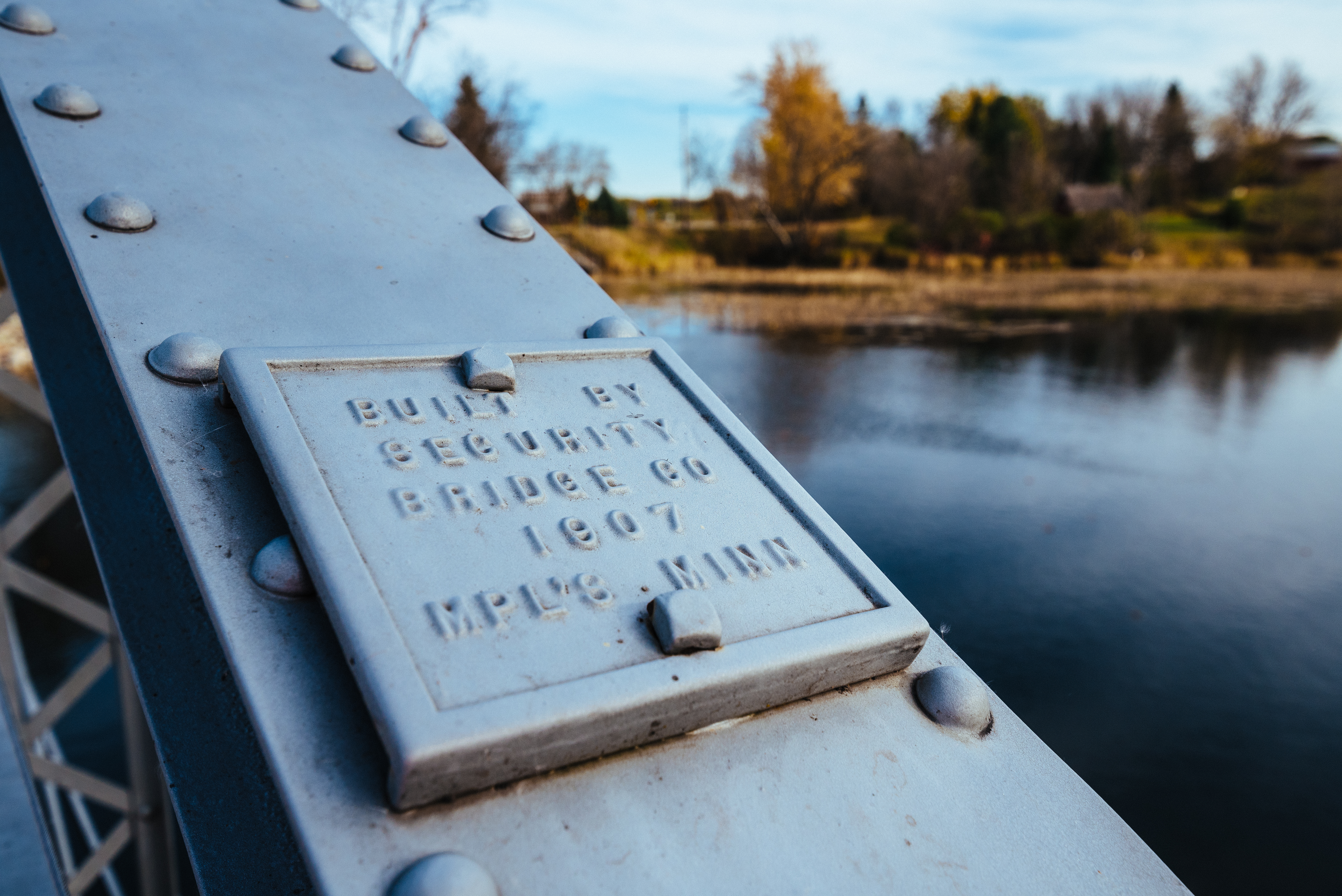
Phelps Mill Bridge

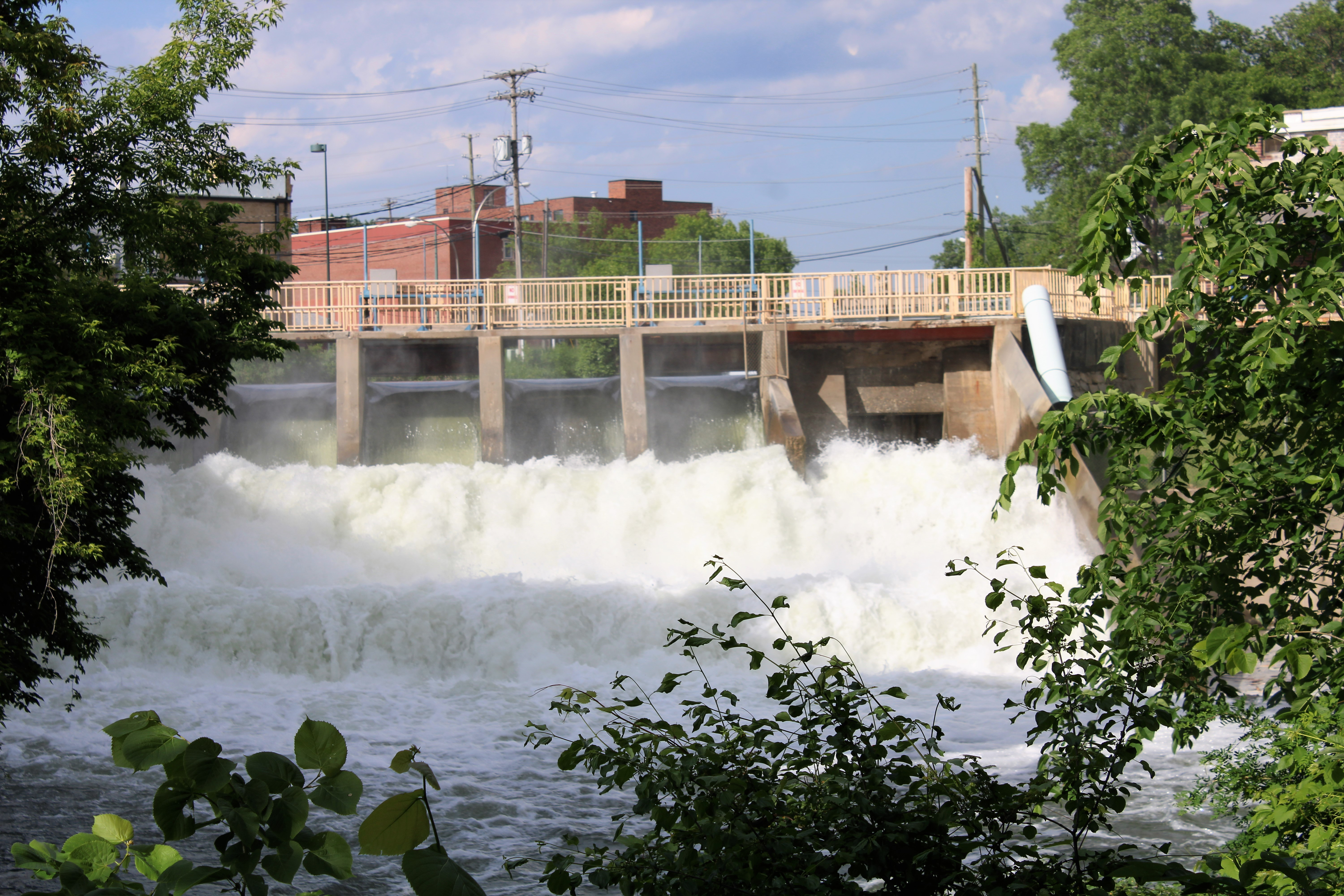
Otter Tail River dam

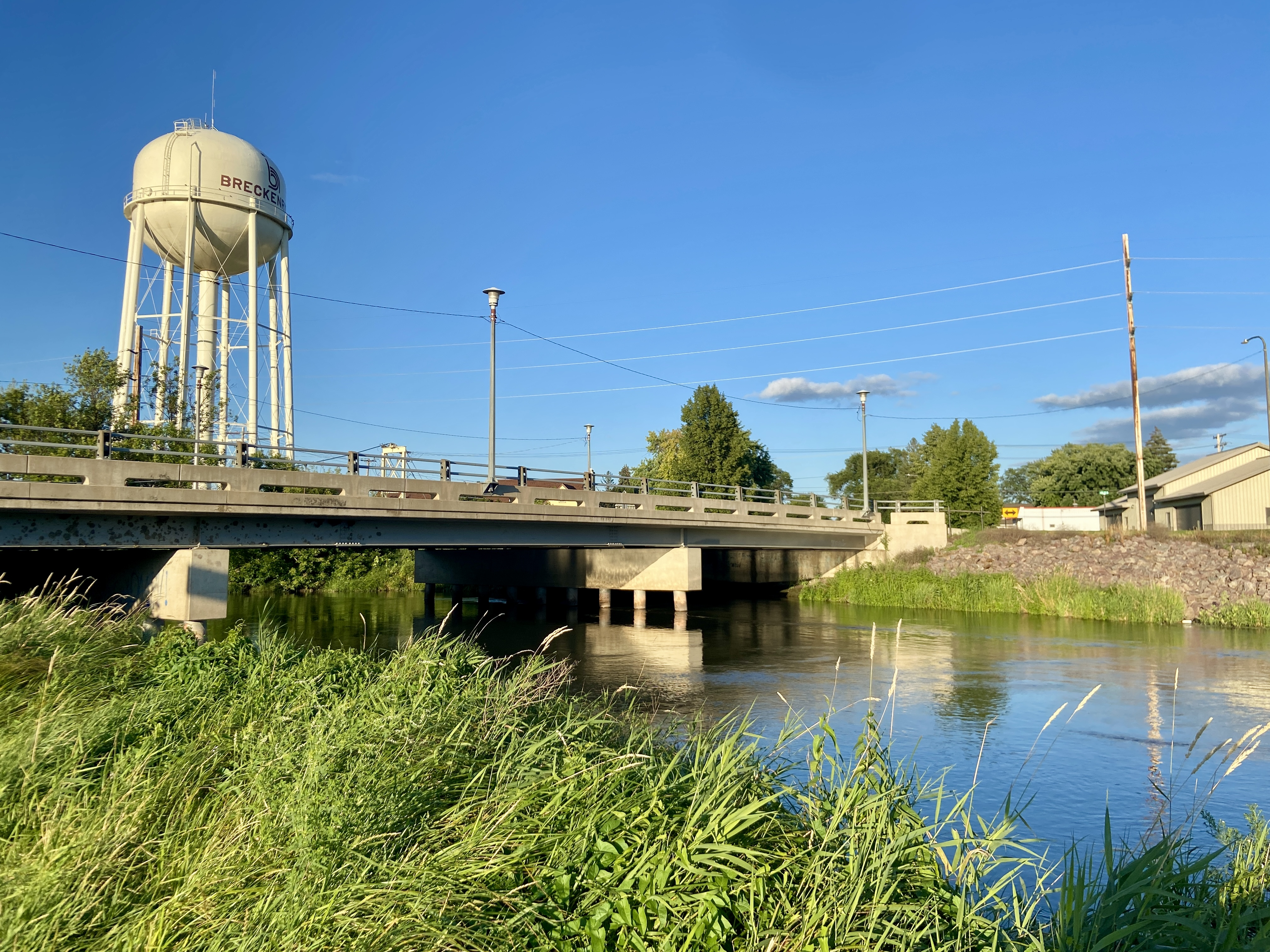
River and Water tower

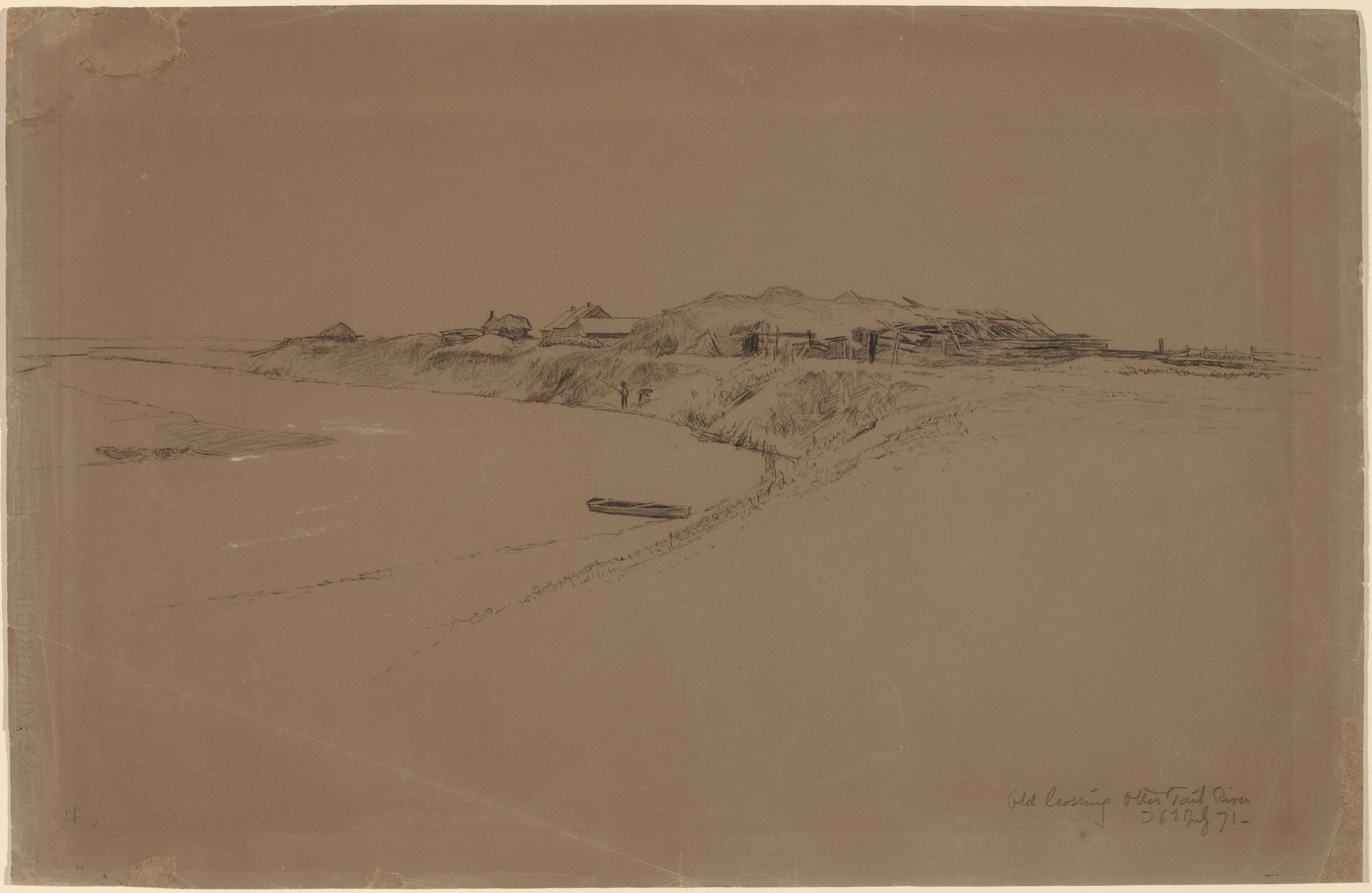
Homer Dodge Martin, Old Crossing, Otter Tail River, 1871

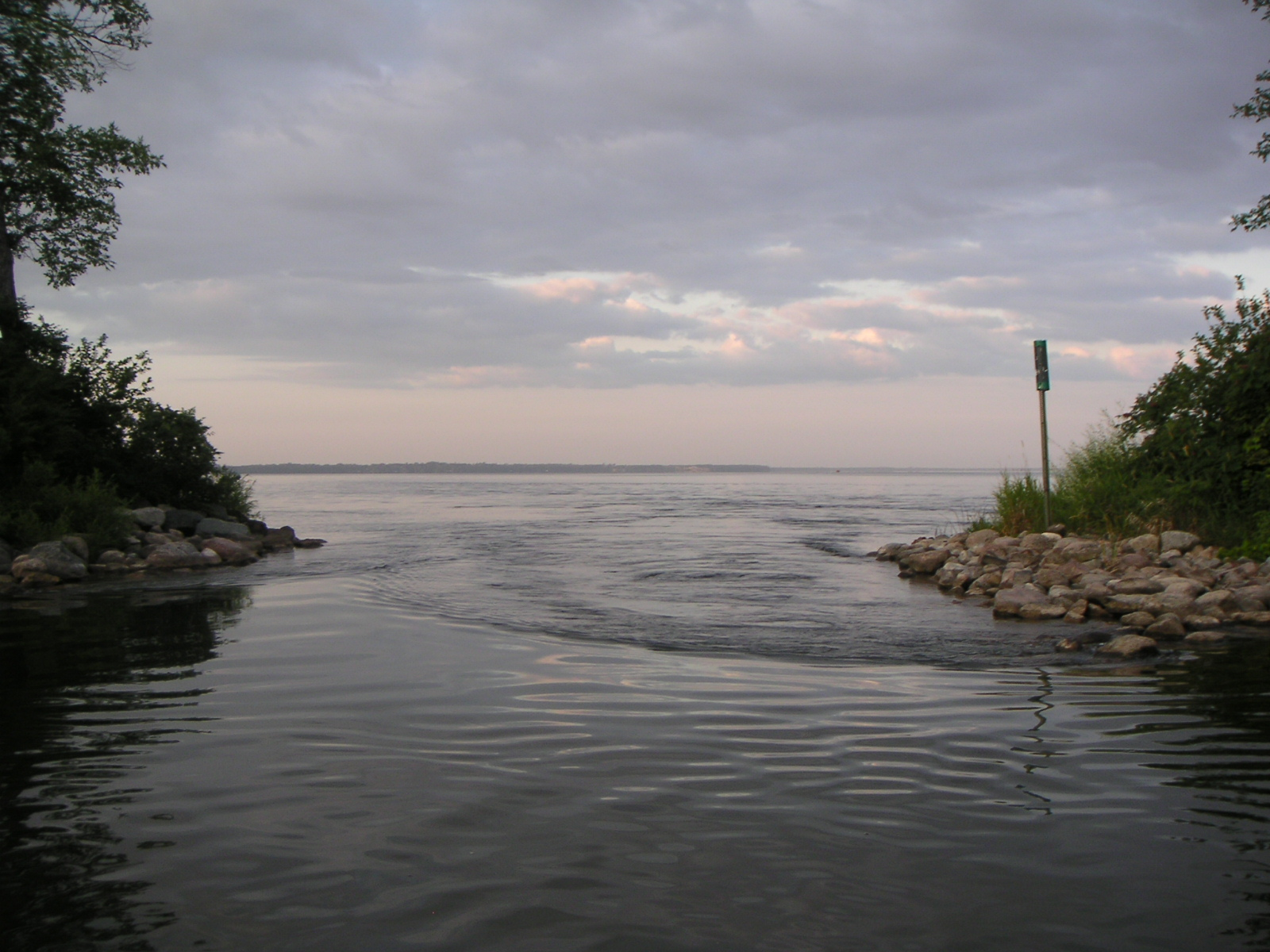
River Inlet

== See also ==
- List of longest streams of Minnesota
- List of rivers of Minnesota
