= List of power stations in Minnesota =

Sources of Minnesota utility-scale electricity generation in gigawatt-hours, full-year 2025:
1. Wind: 15,399 (25.2%)
2. Coal: 14,139 (23.2%)
3. Nuclear: 13,213 (21.7%)
4. Natural gas: 12,699 (20.8%)
5. Solar: 3,165 (5.19%)
6. Biomass: 1,172 (1.92%)
7. Hydroelectric: 921 (1.51%)
8. Other: 288 (0.47%)

This is a list of electricity-generating power stations in Minnesota, sorted by type and name. In 2024, Minnesota had a total summer capacity of 18.2 GW through all of its power plants, and a net generation of 58,595 GWh. In 2025, the electrical energy generation mix was 25.2% wind, 23.2% coal, 21.7% nuclear, 20.8% natural gas, 5.2% solar, 1.9% biomass (including most refuse-derived fuels), 1.5% hydroelectric, and 0.5% other.

Small-scale solar, which includes customer-owned photovoltaic panels, delivered an additional net 484 GWh to Minnesota's electrical grid in 2026. This was about one-sixth the amount generated by the state's utility-scale photovoltaic plants. Independent power producers accounted for more than one-fifth of all generation, especially by harnessing wind in the state's southwestern region. Minnesotans have recently consumed more electricity each year than has been produced in-state.

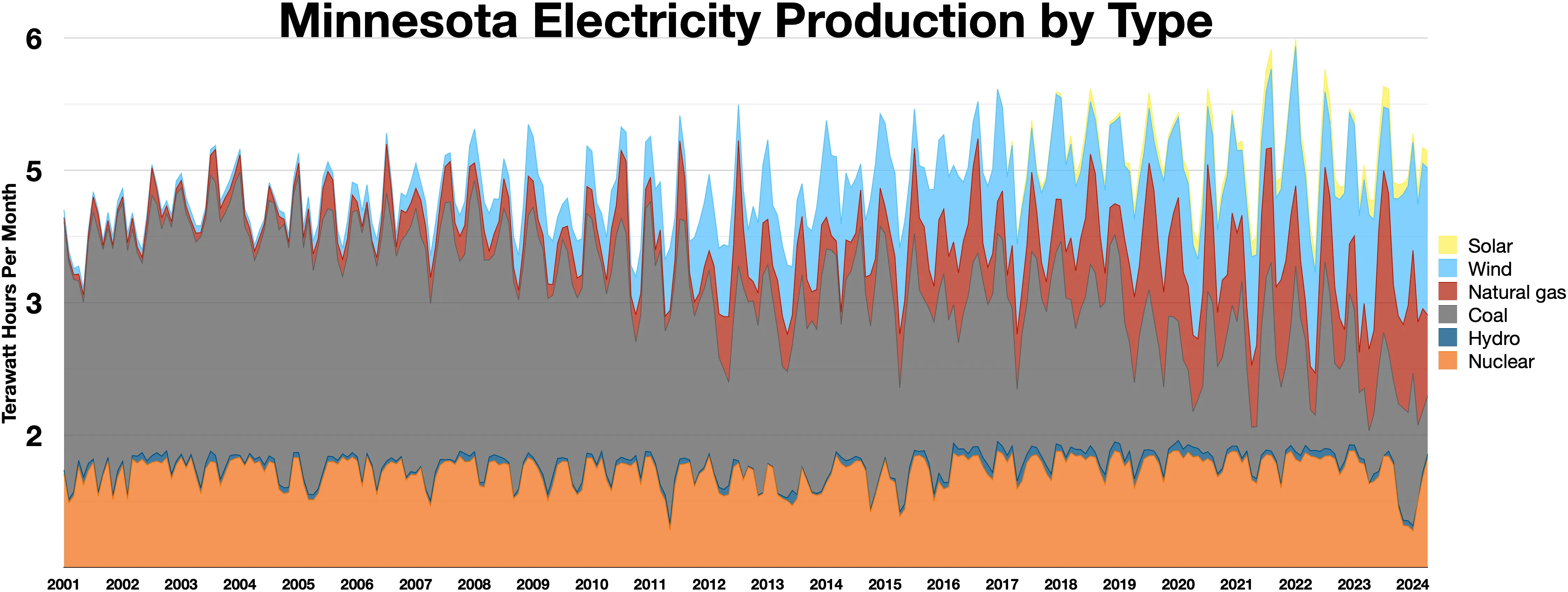
Minnesota electricity production by type

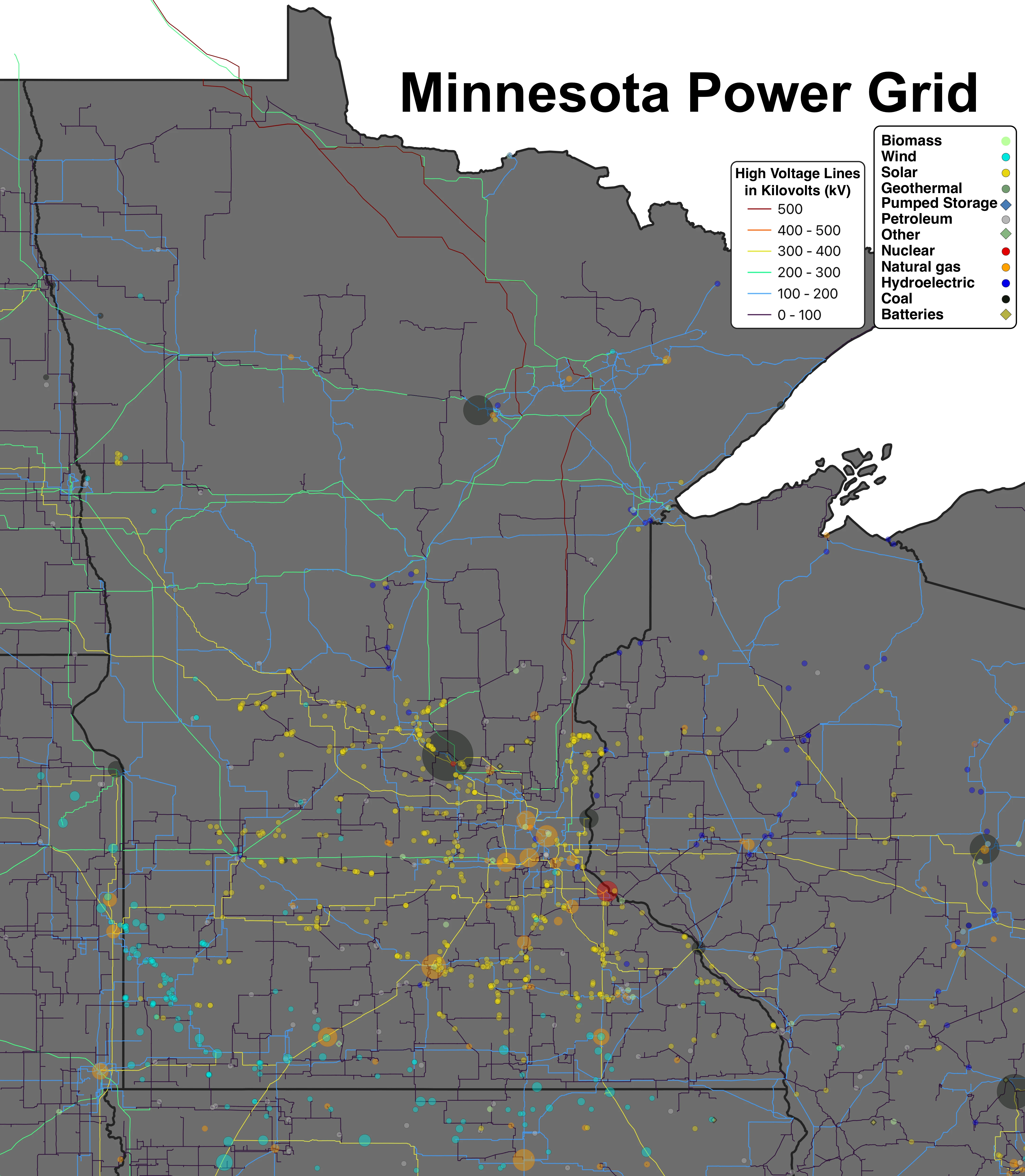
Minnesota power grid

== Nuclear power stations ==
Name	Location	Capacity (MW)	Number of generating units	Reactor type	Owner	Year opened
Monticello Nuclear Generating Plant	Monticello, Minnesota	671	1	Boiling water reactor	Xcel Energy	1971
Prairie Island Nuclear Power Plant	Red Wing, Minnesota	1,092	2	Pressurized water reactor	Xcel Energy	1974

== Fossil-fuel power stations ==
Data from the U.S. Energy Information Administration serves as a general reference.

=== Coal ===
Plant	Location	Capacity (MW)	Number of generating units	Owner	Ref	Year opened
Allen S. King; Generating Station	Oak Park Heights, Minnesota	511	1	Xcel Energy		1967 - closing 2028
Clay Boswell; Energy Center	Cohasset, Minnesota	1,072.5	4 (2 retired, 2 operational)	Minnesota Power		U1: 1958 - closed 2018; U2: 1960 - closed 2018; U3: 1973 - closing 2030; U4: 1980 - closing 2035^{[A]}
Hibbing Power Plant	Hibbing, Minnesota	30.5	3	City of Hibbing PUC		U1: 1965; U2: 1985; U3: 1996
Hoot Lake Plant	Fergus Falls, Minnesota	138	3	Otter Tail		U1: 1948 - closed 2005; U2: 1959 - closed 2021; U3: 1964 - closed 2021
M L Hibbard	Duluth, Minnesota	48	2	Minnesota Power		1949/1951^{[B]}
Sherburne County; Generating Station	Becker, Minnesota	1,704	2	Xcel Energy		U1: 1976 - closing 2026; U2: 1977 - closed 2023; U3: 1987 - closing 2030
Taconite Harbor; Energy Center	Schroeder, Minnesota	155	3 (1 retired, 2 idled)	Minnesota Power		U1: 1957 - closing 2022; U2: 1957 - closing 2022; U3: 1967 - closed 2015

^{A} Minnesota Power intends to transition the 468-megawatt Boswell Unit 4 off coal, which could mean a switch to natural gas, biomass or other sources.

^{B} Minnesota Power lists the M L Hibbard plant as operating with a mix of bio-mass and coal.

=== Natural gas and petroleum ===
Plant	Location	Capacity (MW)	Number of generating units	Generation type	Fuel type	Owner	Year opened
Black Dog Plant	Burnsville, Minnesota	526	3	1x1 combined cycle, simple cycle (x1)	Gas	Xcel Energy	2012
Blue Lake Plant	Shakopee, Minnesota	332	6	Simple cycle (x6)	Gas (x2), oil (x4)	Xcel Energy	1974/2005
Cannon Falls Energy Center	Cannon Falls, Minnesota	357	2	Simple cycle (x2)	Gas	Invenergy	2008
Faribault Energy Park	Faribault, Minnesota	261	2	1x1 combined cycle	Gas	MMPA	2005/2007
High Bridge Plant	St. Paul, Minnesota	606	3	2x1 combined cycle	Gas	Xcel Energy	2008
Hutchinson Plant	Hutchinson, Minnesota	86	4	2x1 combined cycle, simple cycle (x1)	Gas	HUC	1971/1994/2001
Inver Hills Plant	Inver Grove Heights, Minnesota	371	6	Simple cycle (x6)	Gas & oil (x6)	Xcel Energy	1972/1997
Lakefield Junction	Trimont, Minnesota	495	6	Simple cycle (x6)	Gas	Great River Energy	2001
LS Power	Cottage Grove, Minnesota	251	2	1x1 combined cycle	Gas	TYR Energy	1997
Mankato Energy Center	Mankato, Minnesota	654	3	2x1 combined cycle	Gas	Xcel Energy	2006/2019
Minnesota River Station	Chaska, Minnesota	49	1	Simple cycle	Gas	MMPA	2001
Pleasant Valley	Dexter, Minnesota	421	3	Simple cycle (x3)	Gas	Great River Energy	2001
Riverside Plant	Minneapolis, Minnesota	502	3	2x1 combined cycle	Gas	Xcel Energy	1987/2009
Shakopee Energy Park	Shakopee, Minnesota	46	5	Reciprocating engine (x5)	Gas	MMPA	2017
Westside Energy Station	Rochester, Minnesota	46	5	Reciprocating engine (x5)	Gas	RPU	2018

== Renewable power stations ==
Data from the U.S. Energy Information Administration serves as a general reference.

=== Wind ===
Name	Location	Capacity (MW)	Number of generating units	Owner	Ref	Year opened
Blazing Star Wind Farm	Lincoln County, Minnesota	200	100	Xcel Energy		2019
Fenton Wind Farm	Chandler, Minnesota	205.5	137	EDF Renewables		2007
Freeborn Wind Farm	Freeborn County, Minnesota	200	100	Xcel Energy		2019
Grand Meadow Wind Farm	Dexter, Minnesota	100.5	67	Xcel Energy		2008
Lake Benton Wind Farm (I-II)	Lincoln County, Minnesota; Pipestone County, Minnesota	207.4	276	NextEra Energy; Xcel Energy		1998/1999
Nobles Wind Farm	Reading, Minnesota	200	134	Xcel Energy		2010
Odell Wind Farm	Cottonwood County, Minnesota	200	100	Algonquin Power		2016
Pleasant Valley Wind Farm	Dexter, Minnesota	200	100	Xcel Energy		2015
Prairie Rose Wind Farm	Rock County, Minnesota	200	119	Enel Green Power		2012
Red Pine Wind Project	Lincoln County, Minnesota	200	100	EDF Renewables		2017
Stoneray Power	Pipestone County, Minnesota	100	39	EDF Renewables		2019
Trimont Area Wind Farm	Martin County, Minnesota	100	67	Avangrid		2005
Uilk Wind Farm Power	Pipestone County, Minnesota	4.5	3	Uilk Holdings		2019

=== Solar ===
Name	Location	Capacity (MW_{AC})	Owner	Ref	Year opened
Aurora Solar Project	Albany, Minnesota	150	Enel Greenpower		2017
Marshall Solar Project	Marshall, Minnesota	62.3	NextEra Energy		2017
North Star Solar Project	North Branch, Minnesota	100	NextEra Energy		2016

=== Hydroelectric ===
Name	Location	Capacity (MW)	Number of generating units	Owner	Ref	Year opened
Blanchard Dam	Morrison County, Minnesota	18	3	Minnesota Power		1925
Ford Dam	Saint Paul, Minnesota	18	4	Brookfield Renewable Partners		1924
International Falls Hydro	International Falls, Minnesota	14.2	7	Boise Cascade		1924/1946
Lake Zumbro Hydroelectric Generating Plant	Wabasha County, Minnesota	2.3	2	Rochester Public Utilities		1919
Little Falls Dam	Little Falls, Minnesota	2.4	4	Minnesota Power		1921
St. Cloud Dam	St. Cloud, Minnesota	8.9	2	City Owned		1970
Sartell Dam	Sartell, Minnesota	9.5	11	Eagle Creek Renewable Energy		1907
Thomson Hydro	Thomson, Minnesota	72	6	Minnesota Power		1907/1914/ 1919/1949

=== Biomass ===
Name	Location	Capacity (MW)	Number of generating units	Fuel type	Owner	Ref	Year opened
Boise Cascade	International Falls, Minnesota	40	1	wood/ wood waste	Boise Cascade		2015
Cloquet Mill	Cloquet, Minnesota	89	3	wood/ wood waste	Sappi		1976/1997/2001
M L Hibbard	Duluth, Minnesota	48	2	wood/ wood waste/ coal	Minnesota Power		1949/1951
St. Paul CoGen	St. Paul, Minnesota	33	1	wood/ wood waste	District Energy		2003

=== Refuse ===
Name	Location	Capacity (MW)	Number of generating units	Owner	Ref	Year opened
Hennepin Energy Recovery Center (HERC)	Minneapolis, Minnesota	33	2	Covanta Hennepin Energy		1989
Hometown BioEnergy	Le Sueur County, Minnesota	8	1	MMPA		2014
Koda Biomass Plant	Shakopee, Minnesota	20	1	Koda Energy		2009
Olmsted Waste Energy	Rochester, Minnesota	8	3	District Energy		1987/2010
Red Wing Plant	Red Wing, Minnesota	18	2	Xcel Energy		1949
Wilmarth Plant	Mankato, Minnesota	18	2	Xcel Energy		1948/1951
