= Pathfinder Nuclear Generating Station =

Defunct power generation station near Sioux Falls, South Dakota, USA

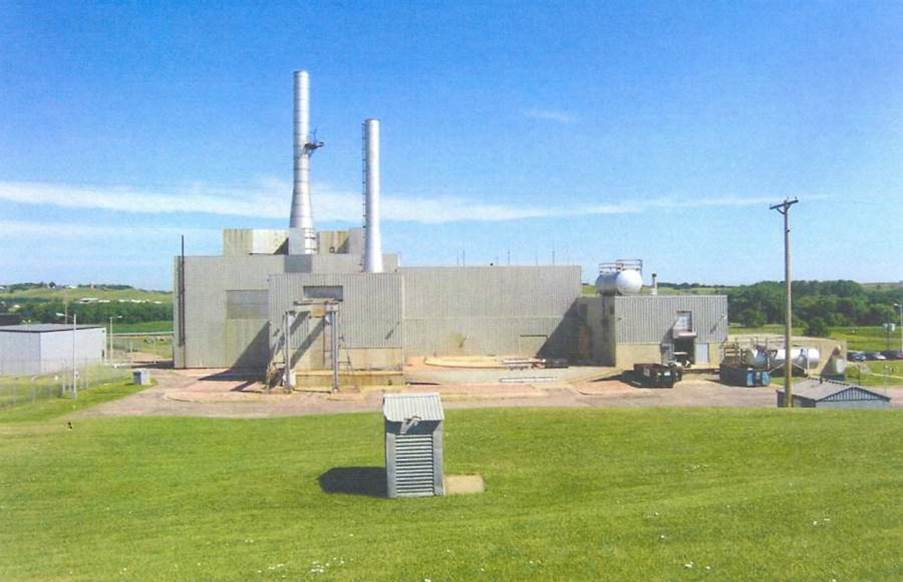
- Country: United States
- Location: Brandon Township, Minnehaha County, near Sioux Falls, South Dakota
- Coordinates: 43°36′13″N 96°38′15″W
- Status: Decommissioned
- Commission date: July 1966
- Decommission date: October 1967
- Operator: Northern States Power

Nuclear power station
- Reactor type: BWR

Power generation
- Nameplate capacity: 59 MW

External links
- Commons: Related media on Commons

The Pathfinder Atomic Power Plant was a nuclear power plant built by Northern States Power Company. It was located just northeast of Sioux Falls, South Dakota, and west of its suburb of Brandon. It was named for the 19th century explorer John C. "Pathfinder" Fremont and was constructed in the mid-1960s in partnership with a group of other investor-owned utilities. The main goal of this facility was to be a 'proof of concept' plant to gain practical experience in operating a nuclear plant. Some of the other participating utilities would also go on to build their own plants. The superheater developed by Allis-Chalmers was plagued with technical difficulties, after the plant first fission in 1964. After two years the Station first began to generate electricity to the grid, and after only about a year, on September 16 1967 an accident occurred which led to NSP's decision to retire the reactor (and convert the plant to run on gas and oil by 1968), the lessons NSP learned from Pathfinder served the company in its operation of the Prairie Island and Monticello nuclear plants. The longest Pathfinder ever ran at its full rated power was 30 minutes, and it was only then the company found the flaws that led to the decision to retire the reactor. After sitting idle for 23 years, the reactor vessel was removed from the plant in 1990 and transported to a low-level radioactive material dump in Washington.

Pathfinder would continue as an oil- or gas-fired peaking plant until it was retired in the early 2000s after its cooling tower collapsed in July 2000. In 1994 the Angus C. Anson Generating Station was built at the same site. Its namesake was NSP's South Dakota division manager Angus C. Anson (1954–1993), who was killed in the plane crash that also killed South Dakota governor George S. Mickelson.

== See also ==
- List of nuclear reactors
