= Sherburne County Generating Station =

Coal-fired power plant in Becker, Minnesota

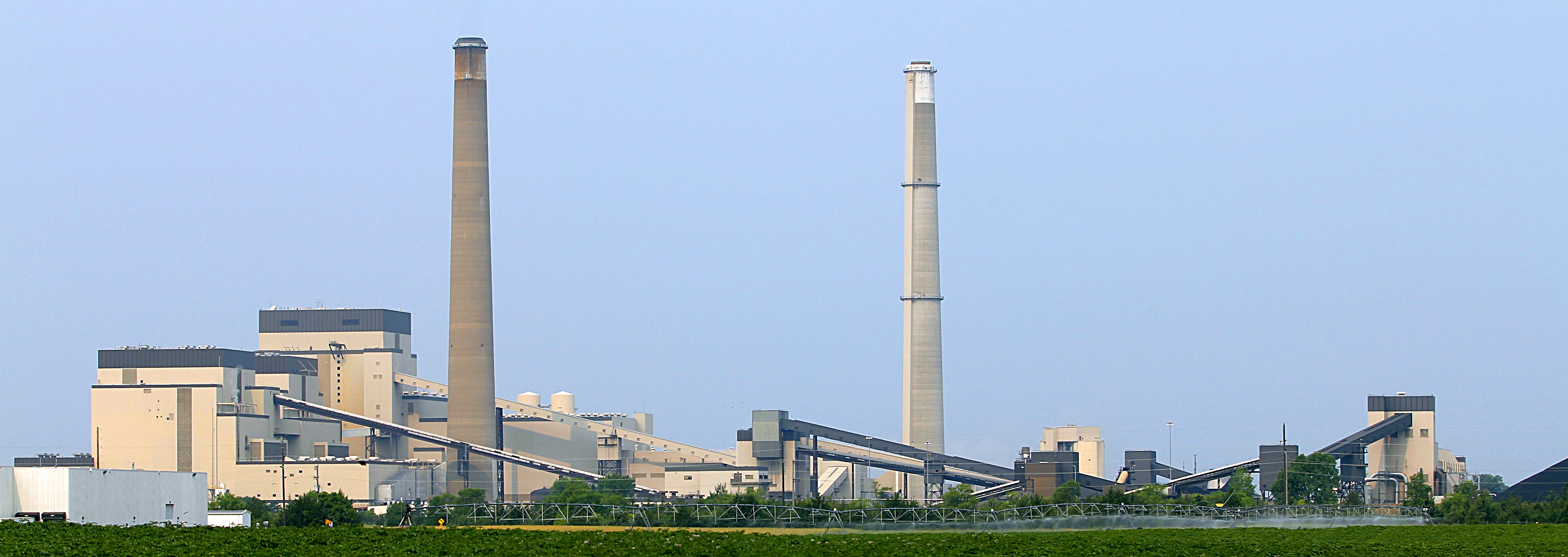
- The Sherco power plant in Becker, Minnesota. The three generator units are on the left.
- Country: United States
- Location: Sherburne County, Minnesota
- Coordinates: 45.3787°N 93.8966°W
- Status: Operational
- Commission date: Unit 1: 1976; 50 years ago Unit 2: 1977; 49 years ago Unit 3: 1987; 39 years ago
- Decommission date: Unit 2: December 31, 2023
- Owner: Northern States Power Company

Thermal power station
- Primary fuel: Coal

Power generation
- Nameplate capacity: 2238 MW

The Sherburne County Generating Station, also known as Sherco, is a large coal-fired power plant on the banks of the Mississippi River in Becker, Minnesota, which is in Sherburne County. Its two active units have a combined capacity of 1,704 megawatts, making it the largest power plant in the state. In comparison, the single-unit Monticello Nuclear Generating Plant located less than four miles away has an output of 671 MW. The state's other nuclear power plant, the 2-unit Prairie Island facility, is rated at 1,096 MW. The station uses 20,000 to 30,000 tons of coal per day. The BNSF Railway delivers up to three 115-car trains per day from mines in the Powder River Basin.

In addition to generating electricity, some steam is also sent from the plant to a nearby paper plant, Liberty Paper Incorporated. The power plant has a normal staff of about 350 people, but up to 800 more employees are on site when the generating units are shut down and undergoing maintenance. The city borders of Becker extend around the plant, making the town heavily dependent on the plant for property tax revenue. The plant's annual $4 million property tax bill covers about 75% of the total for the city of about 4,600 people.

The plant was initially constructed by Northern States Power Company (NSP), now a subsidiary of Xcel Energy. Units 1 and 2, which each have a capacity of 680 MW, came online in 1976 and 1977, respectively. The plant is still mostly owned by NSP/Xcel, although Southern Minnesota Municipal Power Agency has a 41 percent stake in the 876-MW Unit 3, which was built from 1983 to 1987 at a cost of about $1 billion. Both active units have received power upratings that bring their capacities to 765.3 MW and 938.7 MW, respectively.

Unit 2 was shut down on New Year's Eve in 2023.

== Notable outages ==
Generating capacity at Sherco was reduced to 1,500 MW following the catastrophic failure of Unit 3 on November 19, 2011. Repairs were completed at the facility on October 21, 2013 at a cost exceeding $200 million. The incident occurred during a test cycle following an upgrade to the steam turbine where it was intentionally spun up beyond 3,600 rpm to check that safety mechanisms functioned properly. Severe vibration soon developed and pieces of the turbine began to disintegrate. The machine went from over 3700RPM to 0 in less than 10 seconds. Some turbine buckets sliced through the outer casing of the turbine. One cylindrical piece of the exciter the size of a five-gallon (19 liter) bucket landed next to the control room door and was still spinning at sufficient speed to drill a divot into the floor. A hydrogen and lubricant oil fire also erupted in the unit, which was extinguished within a few hours. Two workers were standing between the steam turbine and generator when the incident began, but escaped unharmed. Some workers were treated for smoke inhalation but no serious injuries were reported in the incident.

== Plans for future operation ==
On October 2, 2015, Xcel Energy filed plans with the Minnesota Public Utilities Commission to shut down the plant's Unit 2 in 2023 and Unit 1 in 2026. Prior to this filing, Xcel had planned to reduce its carbon dioxide emissions across the Upper Midwest by 40% by the year 2030 (from 2005 levels), but closing both of these units will contribute to a new goal of a 60% reduction in the same time frame. Generating capacity will be partly replaced with a new natural gas-fired power plant and partly through renewable energy investments. More detailed information was expected to be released in January 2016, with a ruling by the PUC expected later that year.

Initial notes made by the PUC indicate a desire to instead cease operations at the nearby Monticello Nuclear Generating Plant as a reduction in total carbon emissions would come at a greater cost to the rate paying customers in the state of Minnesota. Recent conclusions drawn from Xcel Energy's ongoing rate case with the PUC found that the Monticello plant would cost the customers significantly more than expected. In 2008, Xcel had estimated the expected cost of the project to be $320 million, but during the course of the 2012 electric rate case the company informed the Commission that the actual costs would total $665 million. Subsequent information show costs of approximately $748 million. As a result the PUC has redirected efforts away from ceasing operations at Sherco and the plant is expected to stay open for longer than initially anticipated in order to reduce the impact on low cost electricity supply in the state. Regulators approved the plan in October 2016.

In May 2019, Xcel Energy announced a change where the Sherco plant's third unit will shut down in 2030, about a decade earlier than previously planned, while the company hopes to keep the nearby Monticello nuclear plant in operation until at least 2040, although that is 10 years longer than it is currently licensed to operate. This is part of a strategy to reduce the company's carbon dioxide by 80% by the year 2030, with a goal of running on 100% renewable energy by 2050. The Sherco plant is expected to be the final coal-powered plant operated by the company to cease operations in Minnesota, following the planned closure of the Allen S. King Generating Station in Bayport in 2028. The proposed plan was approved by the Minnesota Public Utilities Commission on February 8, 2022.

It was reported in April 2021 that Xcel will bring a 460 megawatt solar plant online at the site by 2024, the same date as the expected shutdown of one of the coal units, according to the Star Tribune.

== See also ==
- List of largest power stations in the United States
- List of power stations in Minnesota
