= Ben Fowke =

Benjamin G. S. Fowke III is the chairman, president and chief executive officer of Xcel Energy Inc. since August 2011. He is a member of the National Infrastructure Advisory Council.

== Education and background ==
Fowke has a Bachelor of Science in finance and accounting from Towson University and has a CPA from AICPA which he obtained in 1982. He grew up in Annapolis, Maryland.

== Early career ==
In the 1990s, he was the vice president in the NCE Retail business unit. This was before Northern States Power Co. and New Century Energies merged in the year 2000 to create Xcel Energy Inc.

== Career at Xcel Energy Inc. ==
Prior to assuming the role of CEO, Fowke worked in a number of different capacities at Xcel Energy Inc. In 2014, he drew industry admiration as he began navigating the company to become more environmentally sustainable in anticipation of changing EPA regulations. He was the president and COO from August 2009 to August 2011. From December 2008 to August 2009 he was the executive vice president, and from November 2002 to December 2008 he was the vice president.

== Board memberships ==
He is on many boards including Energy Insurance Mutual, the Electric Power Research Institute, and the Nuclear Energy Institute.
