= Dexter Township, Mower County, Minnesota =

Dexter Township, Minnesota
- Township
- Location within the state of Minnesota Dexter Township, Minnesota (the United States)
- Coordinates: 43°42′37″N 92°45′35″W
- Country: United States
- State: Minnesota
- County: Mower

Area
  - Total: 34.7 sq mi (89.9 km^{2})
  - Land: 34.7 sq mi (89.9 km^{2})
  - Water: 0 sq mi (0.0 km^{2})
- Elevation: 1,385 ft (422 m)

Population (2000)
  - Total: 289
  - Density: 8.3/sq mi (3.2/km^{2})
- Time zone: UTC-6 (Central (CST))
  - Summer (DST): UTC-5 (CDT)
- ZIP code: 55926
- Area code: 507
- FIPS code: 27-15904
- GNIS feature ID: 0663977

Dexter Township is a township in Mower County, Minnesota, United States. The population was 289 at the 2000 census. The largest town in the township is Dexter with a population of 333 people. All other areas of the township are unincorporated areas. It is named for Dexter Parritt, an early settler.

== History ==
The township was organized on June 6, 1870 and that day the people of the township elected a chairman (Dexter Parritt) two supervisors, two justices of the peace, a clerk and a treasurer.

== Geography ==
According to the United States Census Bureau, the township has a total area of 34.7 square miles (90 km^{2}), all land.

== Demographics ==
As of the census of 2000, there were 289 people, 100 households, and 79 families residing in the township. The population density was 8.3 inhabitants per square mile (3.2/km^{2}). There were 105 housing units at an average density of 3.0 per square mile (1.2/km^{2}). The racial makeup of the township was 97.23% White, 0.69% African American, 0.35% Pacific Islander, 0.35% from other races, and 1.38% from two or more races. Hispanic or Latino of any race were 0.35% of the population.

There were 100 households, out of which 43.0% had children under the age of 18 living with them, 76.0% were married couples living together, 1.0% had a female householder with no husband present, and 21.0% were non-families. 17.0% of all households were made up of individuals, and 7.0% had someone living alone who was 65 years of age or older. The average household size was 2.89 and the average family size was 3.29.

In the township the population was spread out, with 33.6% under the age of 18, 3.1% from 18 to 24, 31.1% from 25 to 44, 17.0% from 45 to 64, and 15.2% who were 65 years of age or older. The median age was 35 years. For every 100 females, there were 92.7 males. For every 100 females age 18 and over, there were 118.2 males.

The median income for a household in the township was $49,750, and the median income for a family was $58,750. Males had a median income of $28,750 versus $29,500 for females. The per capita income for the township was $27,195. About 11.4% of families and 13.8% of the population were below the poverty line, including 14.6% of those under the age of eighteen and 33.3% of those 65 or over.

== Communities ==
=== Renova ===
Renova is an unincorporated area about two miles northwest of Dexter, along Mower County Highway 2. Had 2 grain elevator, general store ran by Lottie Stern and many other stores in the community. Was located between Dexter and Brownsdale. Was platted 1887 n incorporated in 1900. By 1972 the town was dead.

=== Sutton ===
Sutton was a small trading post on the Chicago Great Western Railway in the early days of the township. Its grain elevator burned in 1887, the train station was moved to Dexter and when the trains discontinued stops there and the few people living there moved elsewhere. Was located between Dexter and Elkton Mn.

== Cemetery ==
- Dexter Cemetery is on the north end of the northwest quadrant of section 13 of the township directly north of the city of Dexter. Its oldest known burial dates to 1888.
