= Renova, Minnesota =

- Unincorporated community
- Location within Minnesota Location within the United States
- Coordinates: 43°44′19″N 92°45′57″W
- Country: United States
- State: Minnesota
- County: Mower
- Township: Dexter
- Elevation: 1,391 ft (424 m)
- Time zone: UTC-6 (Central (CST))
  - Summer (DST): UTC-5 (CDT)
- Area code: 507
- GNIS feature ID: 654900

Renova is an unincorporated community in Dexter Township, Mower County, Minnesota, United States.

Renova was platted in 1900. The Renova post office closed in 1934.
