= Prairie Island Indian Community =

Mdewakanton Sioux Indian reservation in Minnesota

Coordinates: 44°39′05″N 92°41′11″W

Tinta Winta
- Tribal flag

- Prairie Island Indian Community logo

Total population
- 310 (2020)

Regions with significant populations
- United States (Minnesota)

Languages
- English, Dakota

Related ethnic groups
- other Mdewakanton people, other Dakota people

Prairie Island Indian Community (Dakota: Tinta Winta) is a Mdewakanton Sioux Indian reservation established in 1889, with boundaries modified after that time. The federally recognized tribe has lost much reservation land to the requirements of two major federal projects of the 20th century. The United States Army Corps of Engineers was authorized by Congress to construct Lock and Dam No. 3 along the river to improve navigation and took over reservation land to support this. Later, the federal government authorized construction in 1973 of the Prairie Island Nuclear Power Plant nearby, taking more reservation land for this project.

The main reservation lies within the city of Red Wing. Off-reservation trust lands are located both within Red Wing and in Welch Township in northern Goodhue County, as well as in Ravenna Township in eastern Dakota County. These more than double the total landholdings of the tribe. According to the U.S. Census Bureau, the combined reservation and off-reservation trust land have a land area of 4.0 square miles (2,600 acres; 10 km^{2}) The reservation had 310 residents in the 2020 census, including off-reservation trust lands. The tribe operates Treasure Island Resort & Casino on its land near the Mississippi River in northern Red Wing.

== History ==
=== Termination efforts ===
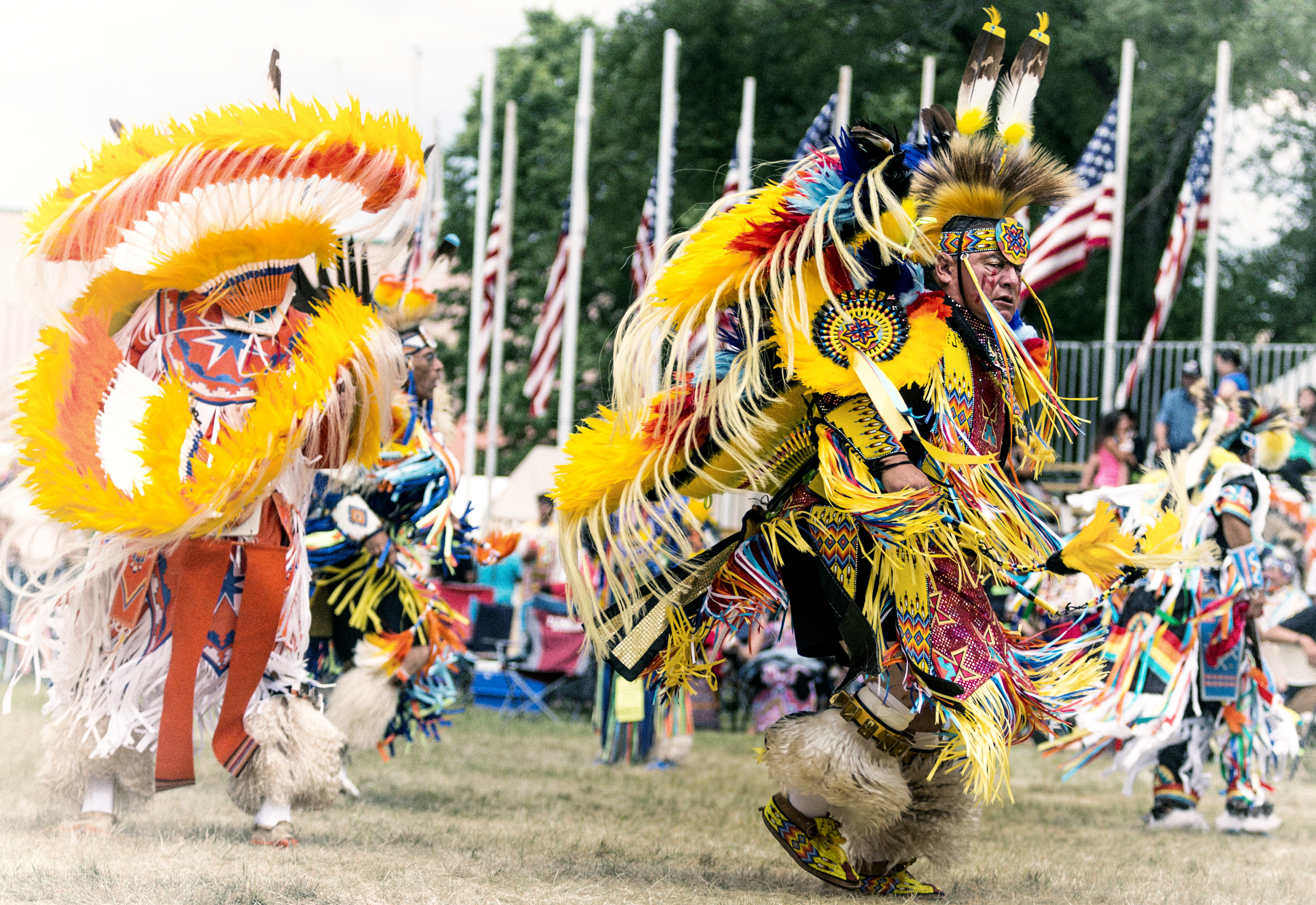
A 2017 wacipi held by the Prairie Island Indian Community

Location of the Prairie Island Indian Community

As part of the Indian termination policy that was followed by the US government from the 1940s to the 1960s, four Native American Groups in Minnesota were targeted. A memo dated 19 January 1955 for the BIA issued from the Department of the Interior indicates additional terminations were being reviewed in proposed legislation for four Indian communities of southern Minnesota including the Lower Sioux Community in Redwood and Scott counties, the New Upper Sioux Community in Yellow Medicine County, the Prairie Island Community in Goodhue County and about 15 individuals living on restricted tracts in Yellow Medicine County.

Discussions between the BIA and the Indians from the targeted area began in 1953 and continued throughout 1954. Though the Prairie Island and Lower Sioux communities drafted agreements with individual land ownership, the Upper Sioux strongly opposed fee simple title to tribal lands. On 26 January 1955 Senator Edward Thye introduced into Congress a bill (S704) to provide for termination of the tribes. Opposition, not only of the Indians, but of other citizens who realized their state expenditures might increase, were made to the committee reviewing the bill. The Minnesota Governor's Commission on Human Rights also opposed the legislation, indicating that it would "not adequately protect the interests of the Indians..." The bill died in committee, never reaching the Senate floor.

=== Controversial construction ===
The Community has lost land to major federal projects. United States Army Corps of Engineers was authorized by Congress to construct Lock and Dam No. 3 along the river to improve navigation and took over reservation land to support this. Later, the federal government authorized construction in 1973 of the Prairie Island Nuclear Power Plant nearby, taking more reservation land for this project.

The plant's owner and operator, Xcel Energy, has stored radioactive waste in above-ground steel casks on the site since 1991. As this area is in the floodplain of the Mississippi River, the Prairie Island Community and others feared that seasonal flooding could damage the casks, resulting in contamination of this important river.

In 2003, Xcel gained legislative authority in Minnesota to expand the number of radioactive waste casks it had on site. The legislature granted the request but required the company to make greater use of renewable energy in generating power, such as wind power. In addition, it was required to pay the adjacent Prairie Island Community up to $2.25 million per year to help with improvements to their evacuation plan (in case of a nuclear accident), as well as the acquisition and development of new land for their reservation. In addition, this money was to help pay for a health study and emergency management activities by the small tribe.

In the 21st century, the Prairie Island Community and others in the area opposed renewal by the NRC of the operating license of this plant, but it was approved in June 2011.

== Geography ==
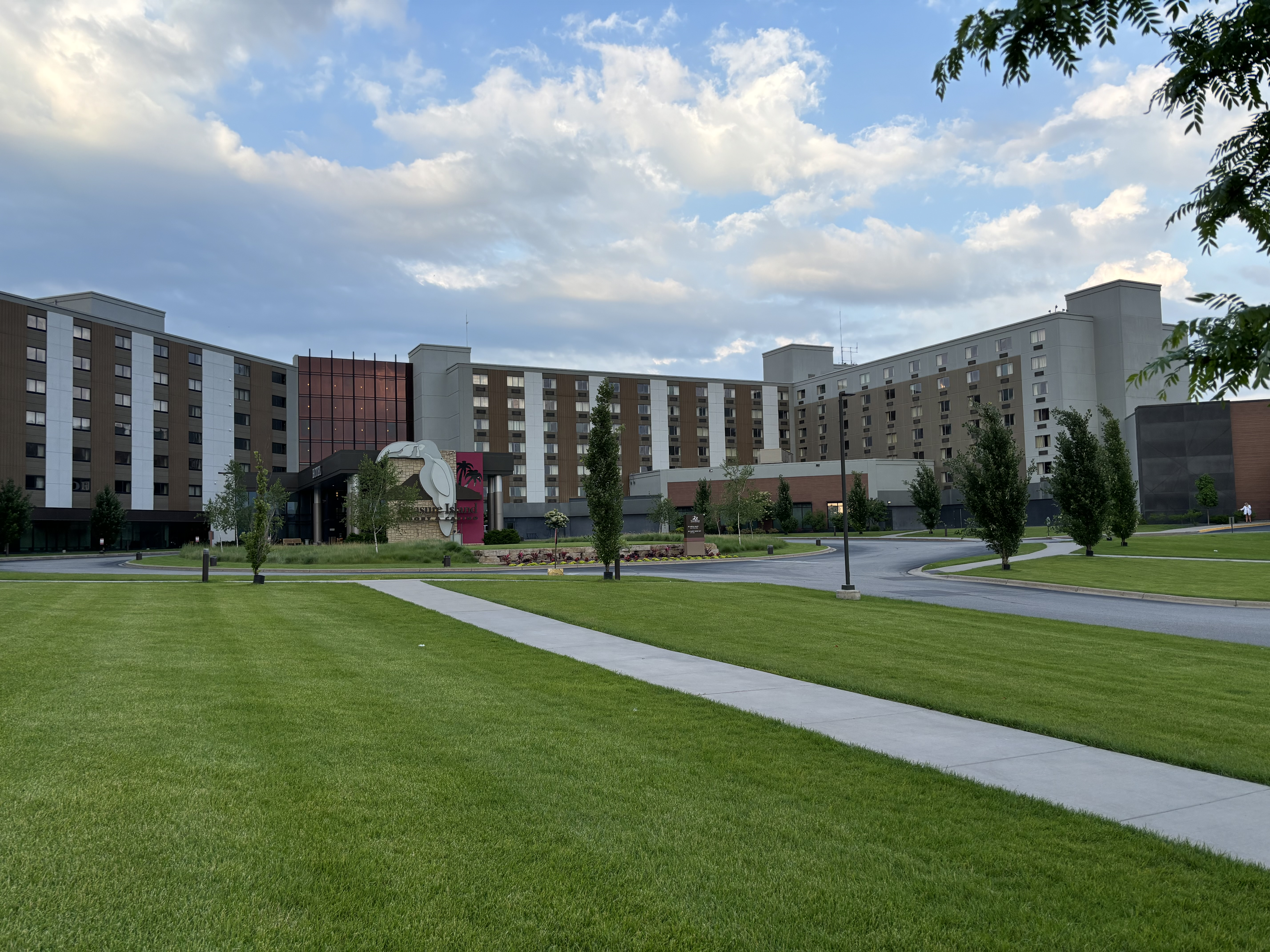
Treasure Island Resort & Casino

According to the U.S. Census Bureau, the combined reservation and off-reservation trust land have a total area of 5.34 square miles (3,420 acres; 13.8 km^{2}), of which 4.0 square miles (2,600 acres; 10 km^{2}) is land and 1.33 square miles (850 acres; 3.4 km^{2}) is water. The land area of the reservation alone was 0.86 square miles (550 acres; 2.2 km^{2}), while the land area of the off-reservation trust land was 3.14 square miles (2,010 acres; 8.1 km^{2}).

== Demographics ==
As of the census of 2020, the combined population of Prairie Island Indian Community and Off-Reservation Trust Land was 310. The population density was 77.4 inhabitants per square mile (29.9/km^{2}). There were 115 housing units at an average density of 28.7 per square mile (11.1/km^{2}). The racial makeup of the reservation and off-reservation trust land was 80.0% Native American, 6.8% White, 1.3% Black or African American, 0.6% Asian, 1.0% from other races, and 10.3% from two or more races. Ethnically, the population was 10.3% Hispanic or Latino of any race.
