= Elk River Station =

Power plant in Elk River, Minnesota

Coordinates: 45.295172°N 93.5567°W

Elk River Station was an energy-from-waste plant that operated in Elk River, Minnesota that generated 35 to 42 megawatts of electrical power.

The site was originally built as a coal and oil-fired facility in 1950, then construction began on a nuclear power plant (boiling water reactor) in 1959. The nuclear reactor was small (22 MW) and only operated from July 1, 1964 until February 1, 1968 before undergoing decommission and dismantlement in the following years, ending in the early 1970s. Some of the spent nuclear fuel from Elk River was sent to Italy for reprocessing as part of a thorium fuel cycle research program; decades later this became the subject of diplomatic exchanges regarding its ultimate fate.

Elk River resumed operating on coal and oil in 1968.

In 1989, the facility was again converted, this time to use Refuse Derived Fuel or (RDF) for fuel. The RDF is made from municipal solid waste. Waste arrives from Anoka, Benton, Hennepin, Sherburne, and Stearns counties, and the ash remaining after incineration is taken to a landfill in Becker, Minnesota.

Elk River Station was operated by the Great River Energy cooperative. Power production at Elk River ended in January 2019.
