= Lock and Dam No. 3 =

Dam in Minnesota and Wisconsin, U.S.

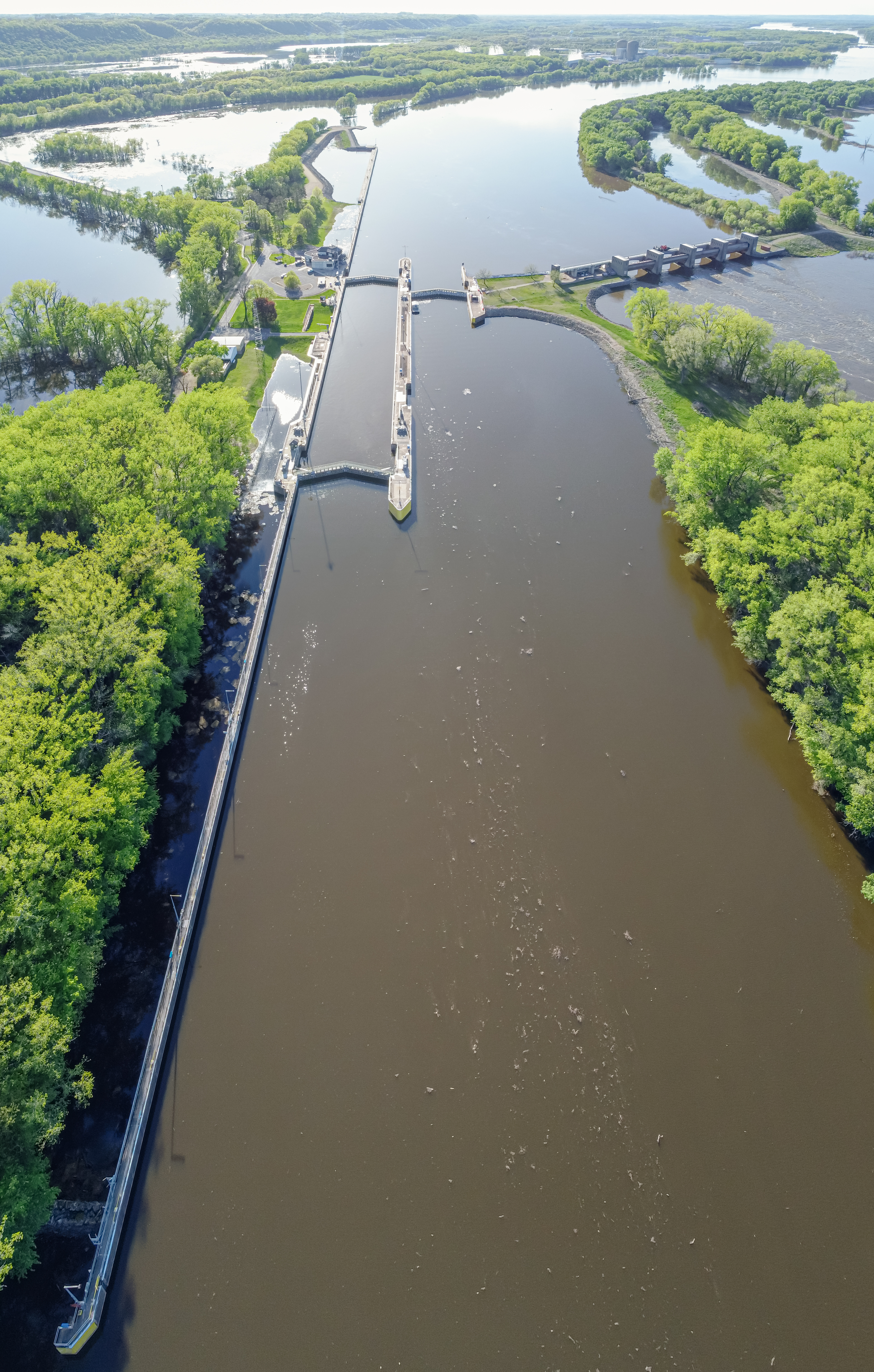
- Mississippi River Lock and Dam No. 3

- Location within Minnesota
- Location: Red Wing, Goodhue County, Minnesota / Diamond Bluff, Pierce County, Wisconsin, United States.
- Coordinates: 44°36′36″N 92°36′37″W
- Construction began: 1935; 91 years ago
- Opening date: July 1938; 88 years ago
- Operators: U.S. Army Corps of Engineers, St. Paul District

Dam and spillways
- Impounds: Upper Mississippi River
- Length: 365 feet (111.3 m) (movable portion)

Reservoir
- Creates: Pool 3
- Total capacity: 1,110,000 acre⋅ft (1.37 km^{3})
- Catchment area: 45,170 mi^{2} (117,000 km^{2})

Lock and Dam No. 3 is a lock and dam located near Red Wing, Minnesota on the Upper Mississippi River around river mile 796.9. It was constructed and placed in operation July 1938. The site underwent major rehabilitation from 1988 through 1991. The dam is 365 feet (111.3 m) long with 4 roller gates. More than 2,000 feet (609.6 m) of earth embankment with a series of upstream spot dikes completes the structure to create Pool 3. The lock chamber is 110 feet (33.5 m) wide by 600 feet (182.9 m) long. The lock and dam is owned and operated by the St. Paul District of the United States Army Corps of Engineers-Mississippi Valley Division.

Many types of vessels use the lock which annually passes more than 11 million tons of cargo, including farm products, chemicals and crude materials as the main items shipped. Each year more than 20,000 recreational craft use Lock 3, making it one of the most popular locks on the river. Also, a number of boats involved with fishing tournament utilize the lock.

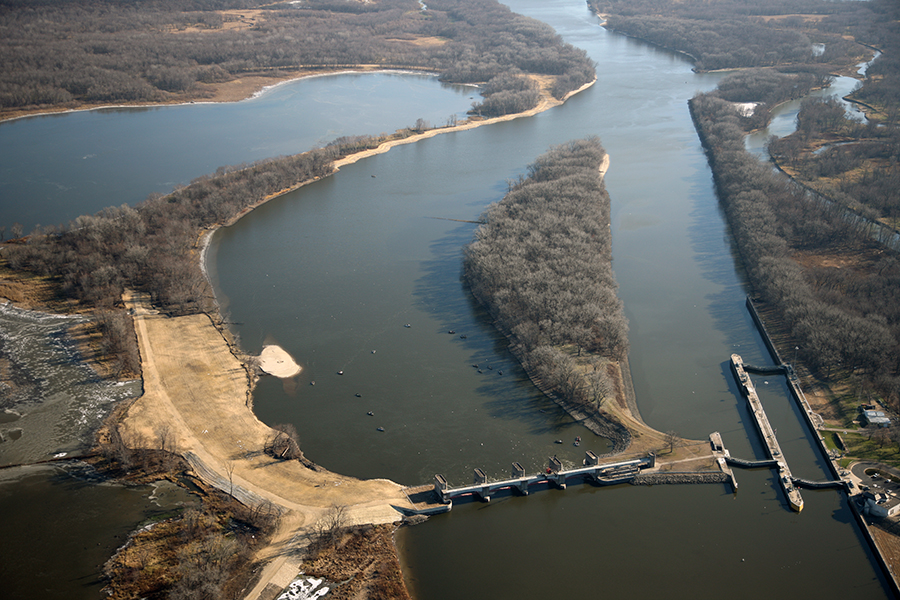

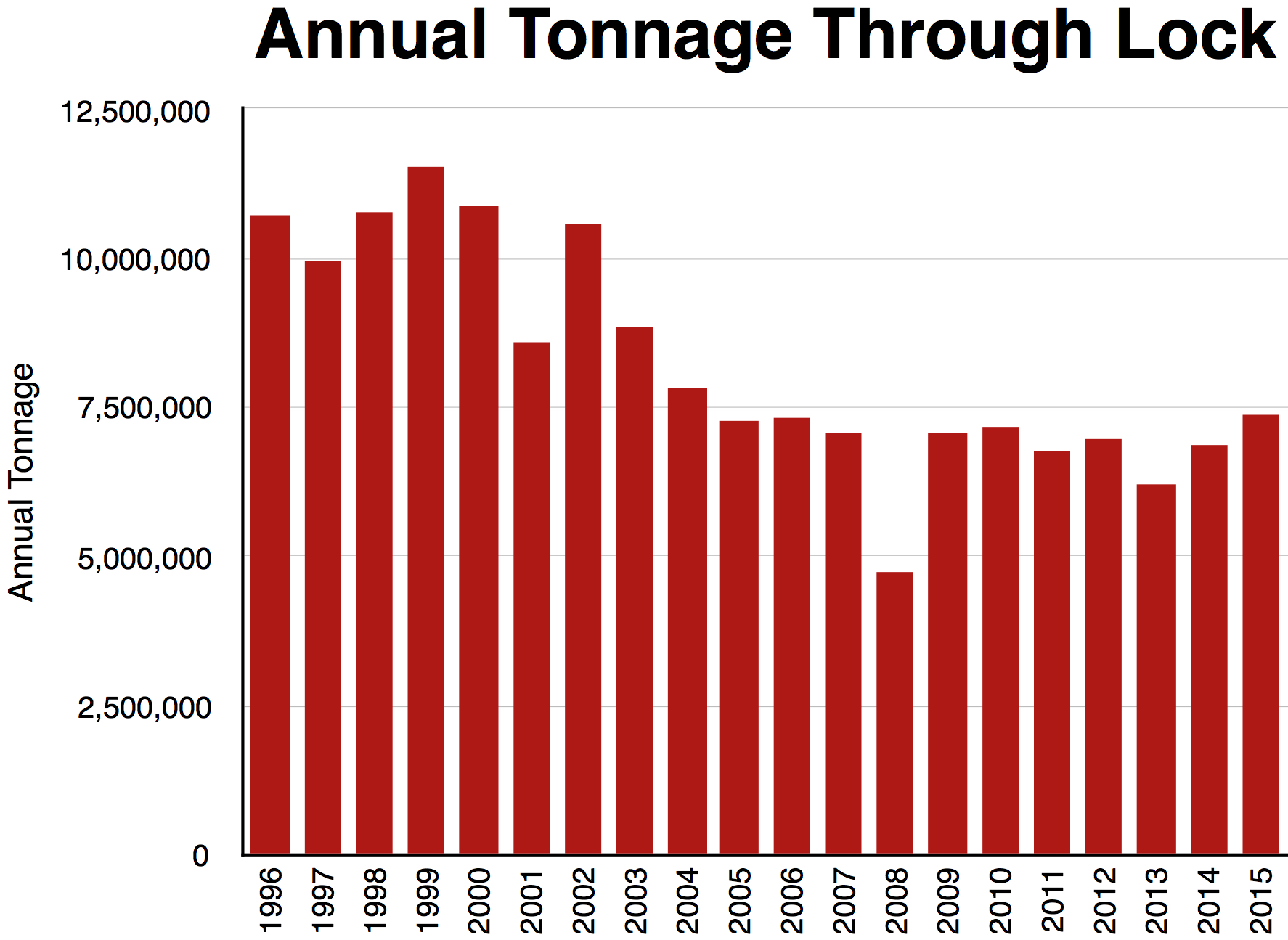

== See also ==
- Public Works Administration dams list
- Prairie Island Indian Community
