= Dexter, Minnesota =

City in Minnesota, United States

- City
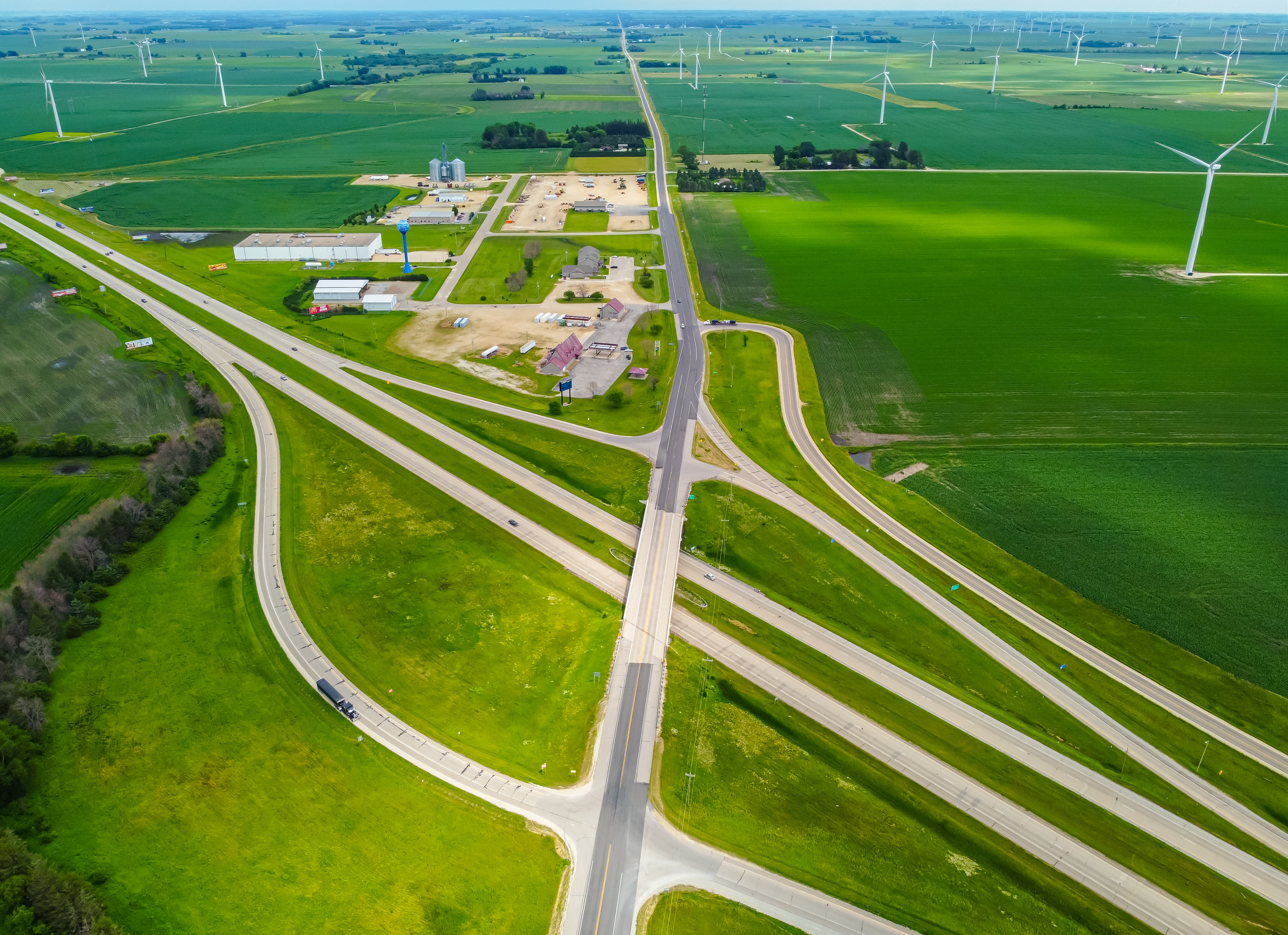
- Located near the Pleasant Valley Wind Farm

- Location in Mower County and the state of Minnesota
- Coordinates: 43°43′10″N 92°42′06″W
- Country: United States
- State: Minnesota
- County: Mower

Area
  - Total: 1.41 sq mi (3.65 km^{2})
  - Land: 1.41 sq mi (3.65 km^{2})
  - Water: 0 sq mi (0.00 km^{2})
- Elevation: 1,411 ft (430 m)

Population (2020)
  - Total: 324
  - Density: 230.1/sq mi (88.83/km^{2})
- Time zone: UTC-6 (Central (CST))
  - Summer (DST): UTC-5 (CDT)
- ZIP code: 55926
- Area code: 507
- FIPS code: 27-15886
- GNIS feature ID: 2394528
- Website: dextermn.com

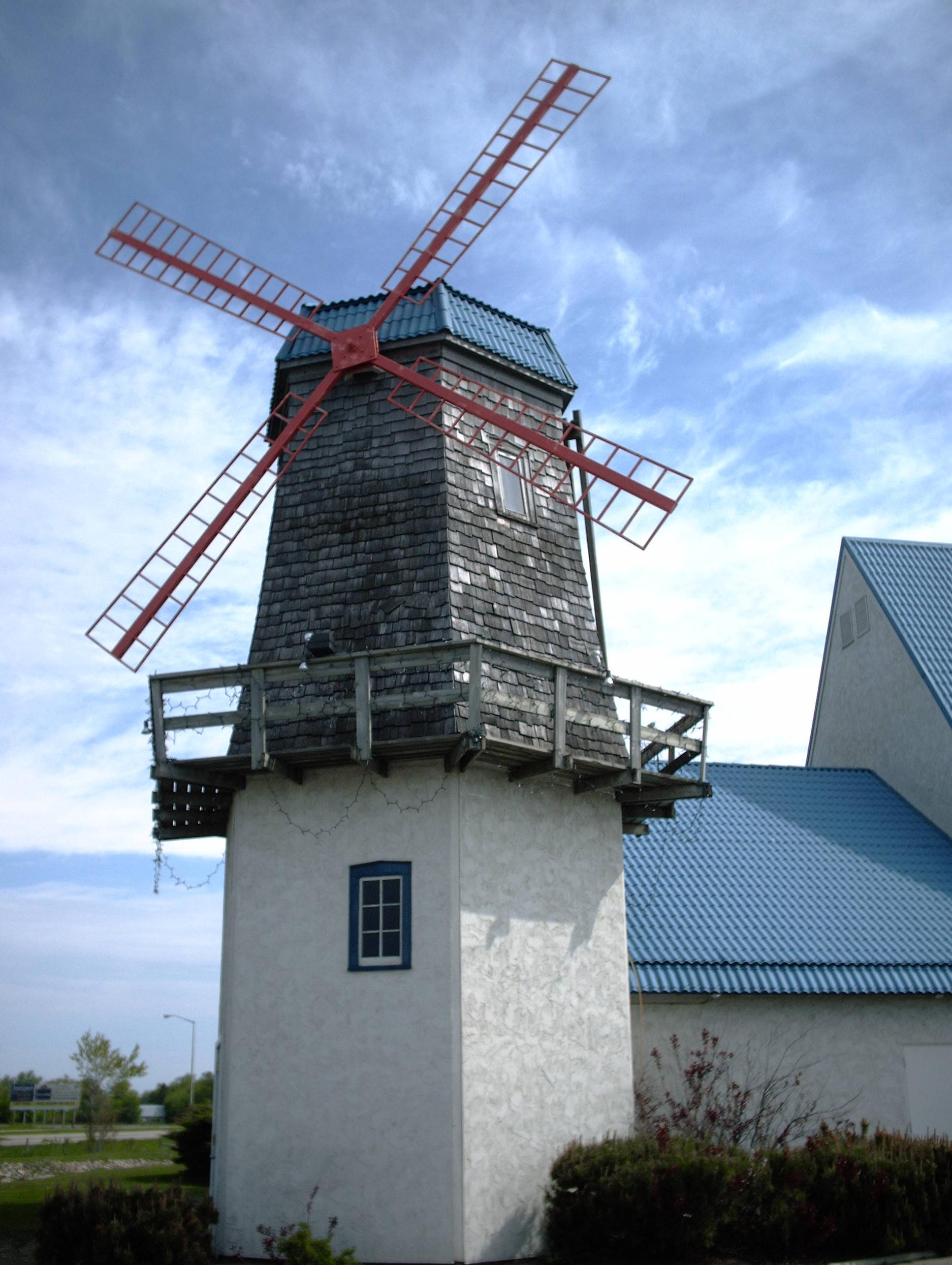
Windmill Truckstop on Interstate 90, a former landmark of Dexter

Dexter is a city in Mower County, Minnesota, United States. The population was 324 at the 2020 census.

== History ==
Dexter was platted in 1874 and named for Dexter Parrit, an early settler. A post office has been in operation at Dexter since 1874. Dexter was incorporated in 1878.

== Geography ==
Dexter is in central Mower County, 15 miles (24 km) east of Austin, the county seat, and 27 miles (43 km) southwest of Rochester. It lies within Dexter Township and to the east of Grand Meadow Township. It is served by Interstate 90, State Highway 16 (MN 16), and Mower County Roads 2 and 7. I-90 leads west to Austin and northeast 16 miles (26 km) to Stewartville, while MN 16 leads east 16 miles (26 km) to Spring Valley.

According to the U.S. Census Bureau, Dexter has a total area of 1.41 square miles (3.65 km^{2}), all land. The city sits on high ground that drains north toward the North Branch of the Root River; east toward the South Fork of Bear Creek, also part of the Root River watershed; and southwest toward Rose Creek, part of the Cedar River watershed.

== Demographics ==
Historical population
Census	Pop.	Note	%±
1880	168		—
1890	150		−10.7%
1900	278		85.3%
1910	281		1.1%
1920	298		6.0%
1930	242		−18.8%
1940	303		25.2%
1950	316		4.3%
1960	313		−0.9%
1970	252		−19.5%
1980	279		10.7%
1990	303		8.6%
2000	333		9.9%
2010	341		2.4%
2020	324		−5.0%
U.S. Decennial Census

=== 2010 census ===
As of the census of 2010, there were 341 people, 144 households, and 100 families living in the city. The population density was 227.3 inhabitants per square mile (87.8/km^{2}). There were 151 housing units at an average density of 100.7 per square mile (38.9/km^{2}). The racial makeup of the city was 95.9% White, 0.6% African American, 0.9% Native American, 0.3% Asian, 0.3% from other races, and 2.1% from two or more races. Hispanic or Latino of any race were 1.8% of the population.

There were 144 households, of which 29.9% had children under the age of 18 living with them, 52.1% were married couples living together, 11.8% had a female householder with no husband present, 5.6% had a male householder with no wife present, and 30.6% were non-families. 26.4% of all households were made up of individuals, and 12.5% had someone living alone who was 65 years of age or older. The average household size was 2.37 and the average family size was 2.78.

The median age in the city was 41.2 years. 21.4% of residents were under the age of 18; 8.3% were between the ages of 18 and 24; 25.3% were from 25 to 44; 29.4% were from 45 to 64; and 15.8% were 65 years of age or older. The gender makeup of the city was 50.1% male and 49.9% female.

=== 2000 census ===
As of the census of 2000, there were 333 people, 130 households, and 89 families living in the city. The population density was 229.8 inhabitants per square mile (88.7/km^{2}). There were 133 housing units at an average density of 91.8 per square mile (35.4/km^{2}). The racial makeup of the city was 97.30% White, 0.60% Native American, 0.30% Asian, 1.20% from other races, and 0.60% from two or more races. Hispanic or Latino of any race were 1.80% of the population.

There were 130 households, out of which 37.7% had children under the age of 18 living with them, 57.7% were married couples living together, 7.7% had a female householder with no husband present, and 31.5% were non-families. 30.0% of all households were made up of individuals, and 11.5% had someone living alone who was 65 years of age or older. The average household size was 2.56 and the average family size was 3.20.In the city, the population was spread out, with 29.7% under the age of 18, 6.6% from 18 to 24, 29.4% from 25 to 44, 22.8% from 45 to 64, and 11.4% who were 65 years of age or older. The median age was 36 years. For every 100 females, there were 88.1 males. For every 100 females age 18 and over, there were 87.2 males.

The median income for a household in the city was $31,875, and the median income for a family was $41,250. Males had a median income of $29,861 versus $23,750 for females. The per capita income for the city was $14,199. About 7.1% of families and 10.4% of the population were below the poverty line, including 11.7% of those under age 18 and 13.2% of those age 65 or over.
