= Monticello Nuclear Generating Plant accident =

Nuclear leak in Minnesota, United States

The Monticello Nuclear Generating Plant accident was a radiation accident that occurred in November 2022 at the Monticello Nuclear Generating Plant in Monticello, Minnesota, U.S., during which over 1,500 cubic meters of radioactive water leaked.

== Background ==
The Monticello Nuclear Generating Plant is a nuclear power plant with a single boiling water reactor (BWR) with a nominal capacity of 671 MW, built and commissioned in 1971. The power plant is located in Wright County, Minnesota, United States, on the banks of the Mississippi River. At the time of the accident, the plant had been in operation for over 50 years, and its license expires in 2030. In 2023, Xcel Energy planned to extend the plant's life by another 20 years. The plant has previously experienced radioactive water leaks. In May 1982, 4.9 cubic meters of water leaked into the nearby Mississippi River. Regulators deemed the leak as "minor."

== Accident ==
According to a March 16, 2023, statement from plant operator Xcel Energy, a leak of radioactive tritium-contaminated water was detected on November 21, 2022, from a pipeline that pumps water between buildings at the power plant. The leak, the operator said, contained more than 400,000 gallons (more than 1,500 cubic meters of radioactive water), which was an early estimate. In December 2023, the calculations turned out to be higher, the levels of water released estimated to be 750,000 to 900,000 gallons of water and 14 curies of tritium. The Nuclear Regulatory Commission was notified the following day, but the circumstances of the accident were not made public until March 2023, four months after the accident.

The company explained that it kept the accident quiet for four months by assessing the environmental impact of the accident, an Xcel Energy representative noting that the threat was minimal so the company did not consider it necessary to immediately make the incident public. According to officials, radioactive water did not leave the borders of the enterprise, did not penetrate the Mississippi River basin and did not get into the sources of drinking water.

The plant repaired the pipe as well as replacing two other pipes that were placed similarly to the one that breached. The company also constructed an underground barrier to keep contaminated groundwater further contained and the plant resumed normal operation after inspecting over 170 locations while searching for the source of the leak. Xcel has installed "dozens" of new monitoring and recovery wells as well as increasing the frequency of measurements.

As of March 2026 cleanup efforts are still ongoing, progress reports mentioning that as of April 2025 Xcel has recovered the "majority" of the 14 curies of tritium released, groundwater level concentration being 90% less of what they were at the peak. The peak groundwater levels of contamination were about 5 million picocuries per liter. The EPA Safe Drinking Water Act's safe level of tritium is 20,000 picocuries per liter and as of October 2025 Xcel reports that none out of the "more than three dozen" groundwater monitoring units detect an amount of tritium over the safe amount, the highest amount. The highest measured amount is 8,800 picocuries per liter.
