= Becker, Minnesota =

City in Minnesota, United States

Becker
- City
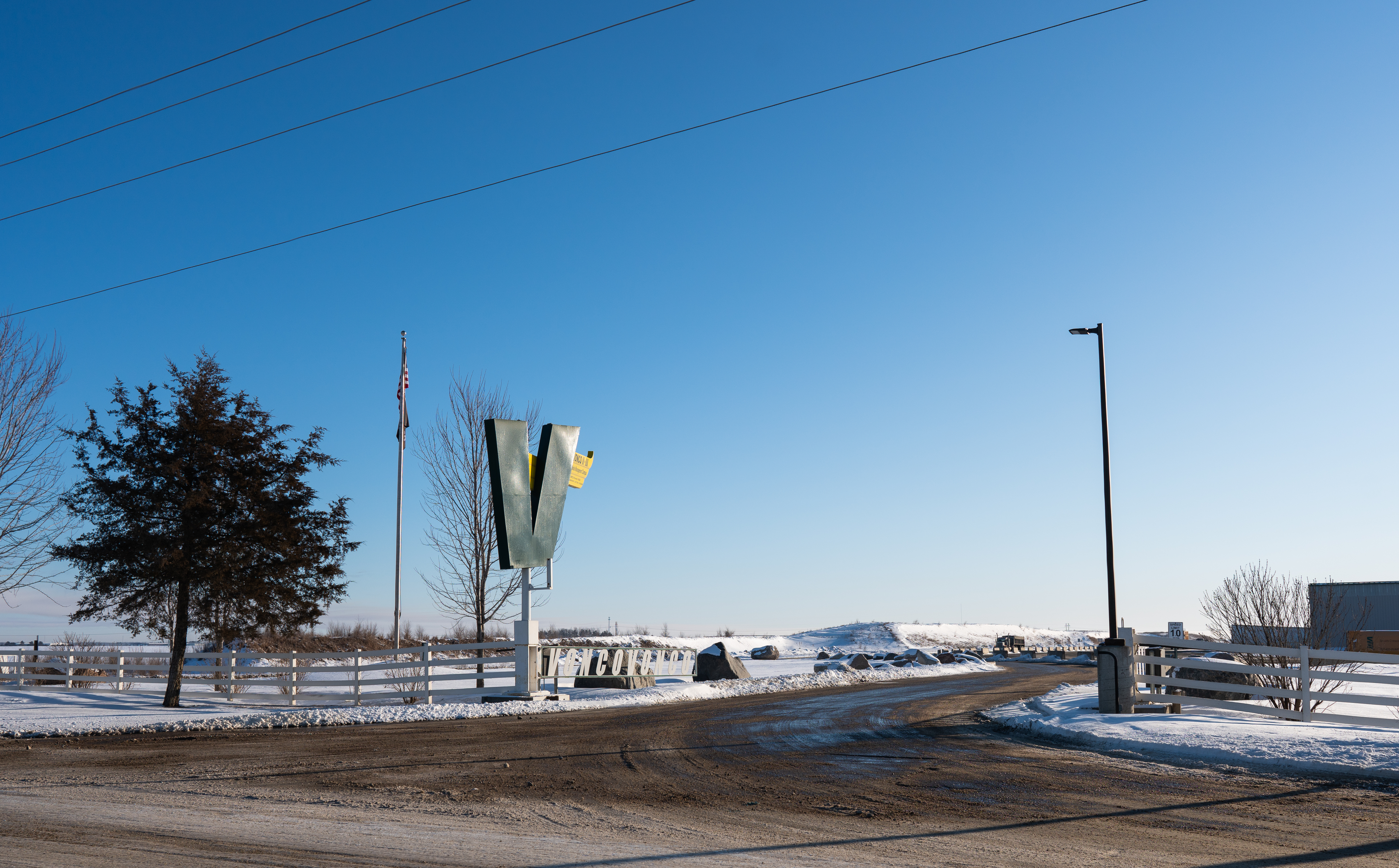
- Sherburne Avenue in Becker, Minnesota

- Location of the city of Becker within Sherburne County, Minnesota
- Coordinates: 45°21′54″N 93°52′22″W
- Country: United States
- State: Minnesota
- County: Sherburne
- Settled: 1855
- Organized: 1871
- Platted: December 5, 1870
- Incorporated: November 22, 1904

Government
  - Mayor: Mark Kolbinger

Area
  - Total: 12.26 sq mi (31.75 km^{2})
  - Land: 11.67 sq mi (30.22 km^{2})
  - Water: 0.59 sq mi (1.54 km^{2})
- Elevation: 965 ft (294 m)

Population (2020)
  - Total: 4,877
  - Estimate (2022): 4,997
  - Density: 418.0/sq mi (161.39/km^{2})
- Time zone: UTC−6 (Central (CST))
  - Summer (DST): UTC−5 (CDT)
- ZIP Code: 55308
- Area code: 763
- FIPS code: 27-04618
- GNIS feature ID: 2394103
- Sales tax: 7.375%
- Website: ci.becker.mn.us

Becker is a city in Sherburne County, Minnesota, between the Mississippi and Elk Rivers. The population was 4,877 at the 2020 census.

Becker is located 46 miles northwest of Minneapolis and 19 miles southeast of St. Cloud. U.S. Highway 10 serves as a main route in Becker.

The city is home to the Sherburne County Generating Station (Sherco) which accounted for 77% of the city's tax base in 2019 and two thirds of taxes generated for the city in 2023. Homeowners have considerable lower property taxes than surrounding communities due to taxes paid by the power plant.

== History ==
Becker was platted in 1867, and named for George Loomis Becker, a state legislator. A post office called Becker has been in operation since 1870.

== Geography ==
According to the United States Census Bureau, the city has a total area of 9.1 square miles (23.57 km^{2}); 9.1sq. mi is land and 0.45 square miles (1.17 km^{2}) is water.

== Business ==
Xcel Energy operates the Sherburne County Generating Station (Sherco) within the city. This plant is the largest coal-fired power plant in Minnesota. Because the power plant pays a large amount in property taxes, Becker residents pay considerably less in property taxes than in nearby communities. The city has relied on property taxes from the power plant with about 2/3 of the cities taxes coming from the plant. There have been proposals to close portions of the power plant since 2015 and the city has worked to develop plans should that property tax revenue fall. In 2023, Becker successfully lobbied the Minnesota legislature for aid in expectation of reduced taxes.

Becker Minnesota's zip code, 55308, was listed by the Minnesota Pollution Control Agency in 2020 as the state's largest single source of carbon dioxide (CO_{2}) equivalent emissions from 'air permitted facilities'. Sherco operator Excel Energy has announced plans to close the plants by the end of the decade.

Google originally planned to build a data center in Becker, the company would've become one of Xcel Energy's largest customers. Although Google ended up backing out in late 2022. Instead on February 12, 2024 Microsoft ended up buying 300 acres of land originally planned for the Google site. Microsoft will be building a data center in this area, the time period is unknown at this time.

In late February 2020, firefighters responded to a report of a fire at Northern Metals Recycling in Becker. Northern Metals Recycling moved its operations from Minneapolis to Becker the year before, after being ordered to shut down by the Pollution Control Agency due to high levels of air pollution. The fire was reported to have started under a pile of cars. The fire lasted several days, and caused schools to close in order to conduct air quality testing. More than three dozen fire departments were reported to have been on scene. Eventually, it was decided in tandem with the Minnesota Pollution Control Agency and the Minnesota Department of Health that the best course of action would be to let the fire burn out. This decision was also influenced by the fact that water resources were being quickly depleted from Becker and the neighboring vicinity.

== Demographics ==
Historical population
Census	Pop.	Note	%±
1910	210		—
1920	210		0.0%
1930	214		1.9%
1940	239		11.7%
1950	264		10.5%
1960	279		5.7%
1970	365		30.8%
1980	601		64.7%
1990	902		50.1%
2000	2,673		196.3%
2010	4,538		69.8%
2020	4,877		7.5%
2022 (est.)	4,997		2.5%
U.S. Decennial Census; 2020 Census

=== 2020 census ===
As of the 2020 census, Becker had a population of 4,877. The median age was 33.0 years. 30.9% of residents were under the age of 18 and 10.9% of residents were 65 years of age or older. For every 100 females there were 97.0 males, and for every 100 females age 18 and over there were 94.8 males age 18 and over.

0.0% of residents lived in urban areas, while 100.0% lived in rural areas.

There were 1,726 households in Becker, of which 43.5% had children under the age of 18 living in them. Of all households, 54.9% were married-couple households, 13.2% were households with a male householder and no spouse or partner present, and 21.7% were households with a female householder and no spouse or partner present. About 21.7% of all households were made up of individuals and 9.5% had someone living alone who was 65 years of age or older.

There were 1,792 housing units, of which 3.7% were vacant. The homeowner vacancy rate was 0.7% and the rental vacancy rate was 9.5%.

Racial composition as of the 2020 census
Race	Number	Percent
White	4,526	92.8%
Black or African American	37	0.8%
American Indian and Alaska Native	13	0.3%
Asian	36	0.7%
Native Hawaiian and Other Pacific Islander	0	0.0%
Some other race	22	0.5%
Two or more races	243	5.0%
Hispanic or Latino (of any race)	131	2.7%

=== 2010 census ===
As of the census of 2010, there were 4,538 people, 1,526 households, and 1,164 families residing in the city. The population density was 430.1 inhabitants per square mile (166.1/km^{2}). There were 1,644 housing units at an average density of 155.8 per square mile (60.2/km^{2}). The racial makeup of the city was 96.6% White, 0.5% African American, 0.2% Native American, 0.9% Asian, 0.1% Pacific Islander, 0.2% from other races, and 1.6% from two or more races. Hispanic or Latino of any race were 1.7% of the population.

There were 1,526 households, of which 50.6% had children under the age of 18 living with them, 59.7% were married couples living together, 11.6% had a female householder with no husband present, 5.0% had a male householder with no wife present, and 23.7% were non-families. 18.3% of all households were made up of individuals, and 6.7% had someone living alone who was 65 years of age or older. The average household size was 2.93 and the average family size was 3.35.

The median age in the city was 30.7 years. 34.1% of residents were under the age of 18; 7.3% were between the ages of 18 and 24; 32.2% were from 25 to 44; 17% were from 45 to 64; and 9.3% were 65 years of age or older. The gender makeup of the city was 48.2% male and 51.8% female.

=== 2000 census ===
As of the census of 2000, there were 2,673 people, 929 households, and 728 families residing in the city. The population density was 308.6 inhabitants per square mile (119.2/km^{2}). There were 967 housing units at an average density of 111.6 per square mile (43.1/km^{2}). The racial makeup of the city was 98.20% White, 0.34% African American, 0.45% Native American, 0.45% Asian, 0.07% from other races, and 0.49% from two or more races. Hispanic or Latino of any race were 0.79% of the population.

There were 929 households, out of which 49.1% had children under the age of 18 living with them, 62.9% were married couples living together, 10.9% had a female householder with no husband present, and 21.6% were non-families. 15.2% of all households were made up of individuals, and 3.7% had someone living alone who was 65 years of age or older. The average household size was 2.88 and the average family size was 3.21.

In the city, the population was spread out, with 34.0% under the age of 18, 10.1% from 18 to 24, 35.7% from 25 to 44, 13.9% from 45 to 64, and 6.3% who were 65 years of age or older. The median age was 28 years. For every 100 females, there were 99.0 males. For every 100 females age 18 and over, there were 99.0 males.

The median income for a household in the city was $50,714, and the median income for a family was $51,940. Males had a median income of $37,038 versus $26,622 for females. The per capita income for the city was $19,333. About 3.4% of families and 4.1% of the population were below the poverty line, including 4.3% of those under age 18 and 3.4% of those age 65 or over.

== Government ==
Becker is represented by Andrew Mathews in the Minnesota Senate and Shane Mekeland in the Minnesota House of Representatives. Both are members of the Republican Party of Minnesota. On a federal level, Becker is located in Minnesota's 6th congressional district, represented by Tom Emmer.

== Attractions ==
=== Parks ===
Becker contains nine city parks, including the Becker City Park which sits on over 100 acres. In 2020 a dog park was added onto the City Park.

The other city parks include the Becker Athletic Complex (BAC), the Becker Community Center, Carl E. Johnson park, Kolbinger Park, Pleasant Valley park, River's Edge Park, Snuffy's Landing, and the Tot Lot.

=== Golf Course ===
Becker is home to Pebble Creek Golf Course, a 27-hole course which is open to the public.

=== Public Library ===
The Becker Public Library is a branch of Great River Regional Library. The library is located within the community center on County Road 23 (Sherburne Avenue).

== Transportation ==
U.S. Highway 10 (co-signed and Minnesota State Highway 25) are the primary highway routes through Becker. U.S. Highway 10 plays a considerable role in the economy of the city, as many of Becker's businesses are located along it.

County Road 23 (Sherburne Avenue) also makes its starting point in Becker.

Amtrak’s Empire Builder, which operates between Seattle/Portland and Chicago, passes through the town on BNSF tracks, but makes no stop. The nearest station is located in St. Cloud, 20 miles (32 km) to the northwest.

The proposed extension of the Northstar Commuter Rail to St. Cloud would include a stop in Becker. It is currently served by Northstar Link Commuter Bus between Big Lake and St. Cloud.

== Media ==
Becker is home to one newspaper, the Patriot. Previously the Citizen-Tribune, the Patriot is a self-described "full-service medium to avid readers in Central Minnesota." It is also served by the Saint Cloud Times and the Star Tribune.

== Education ==
Becker is served by the Independent School District 726. The four schools, listed below, have a total enrollment of 2,697 students.

- Becker Early Education Center (Early Child & Family Education, PreK)
- Becker Primary School (K-2)
- Becker Intermediate School (3-5)
- Becker Middle School (6-8)
- Becker High School (9-12)

== Sports ==
Football The Becker High School Football program was started by Dwight Lundeen in 1970. Coach Lundeen remains the only head coach in the history of the program. The Becker program won the class AAA championship in 2005 and class AAAA championships in 2014, 2015, 2024. They are now currently in class AAAA and in the Mississippi 8 conference. They have 19 conference championships, 14 section championship, 16 state tournament appearances, and have also appeared in seven prep bowls, making Becker Football one of the most successful football programs in Minnesota.

Robotics Becker is home to 4 time MSHSL State Champion FRC 4607 Coalition of Independent Students (CIS) which competes in the FIRST Robotics Competition. The Robotics team was established in March 31, 2012, with the founders being Alex Jurek, a Technology Education teacher at Becker High School, and Mark Kolbinger, an English Teacher / School Counselor at Becker Middle School.

Becker Track & Field Becker has experienced numerous successes within the MSHSL since the Becker program started back around 1935. Becker's first state entrant found in results was Jerome Anderson in 1935 as he was the Region 5 champion in the High Hurdles. Anderson continued to compete for Becker in 1937 and 1938. The Becker Girls Track & Field program began in 1968 and had their first state entrant in 1972 with Diane Sakry in the MSHSL's first ever Girls State Track&Field Meet. Becker Track&Field's first state champion was Charlene Hubbard who won the 1600m run with a time of 5:01.28. Becker Track & Field has also had State Champions with Tony Brunsberg, Tony Brunsberg, Troy Tiege, Jena Cox, Ryan Zenzen, Tom Stanger, Jared Posthumaus, Carter Reckelberg x3 , and Owen Angell. Additionally, the Track & Field team won the 2025 MSHSL State Boys Team Championship with strong performances from boys in the 100m, 200m, Long Jump, Pole Vault, 110mHH, 300mH, 3200m, 4x200m relay, 4x800m relay.

Becker Cross Country Becker has held a tradition of success within Cross Country since the cross Country program began. Becker Cross Country produced Becker's First ever State Champion in any sport as Jackie Hubbard won the crown in 1982. She was part of a qualifying girls team that placed 4th in the state that year (Team: Jackie Hubbard, Charlene Hubbard, Lisa McLain, Ruth Ann Olson, Rhonda Parker, Deana Hubbard, Chris James; coached by Bob Schneider). The girls team placed 3rd in 1983. In 2004, the girls team placed 4th, and they were 10th in 2005. In 2008 the girls were the 11th place team. In 2021, the girls team earned 6th, they were 4th in 2022, and 10th in 2023. It was in 2024 that the Bulldog Cross Country 'Conquered the Never Before' as both the boys and the girls teams advanced to the state meet with the boys first ever team appearance. The Bulldogs repeated the double-team-advancement in 2025 with both boys and girls advancing.
