= Prairie Island Nuclear Power Plant =

Nuclear power plant located in Red Wing, Minnesota

Prairie Island Nuclear Generating Station
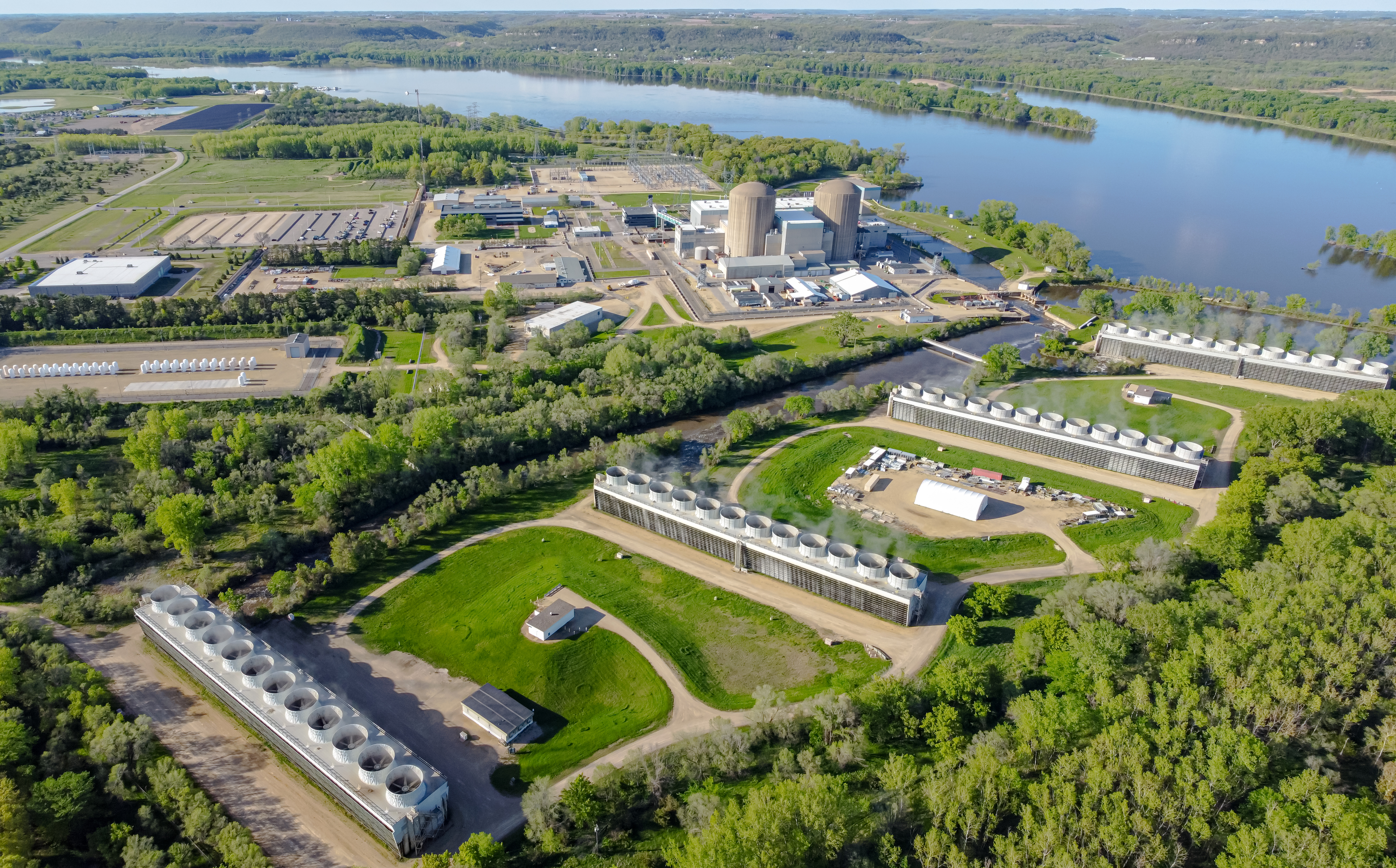
- Prairie Island Nuclear Generating Plant in 2024
- Official name: Prairie Island Nuclear Generating Station, Prairie Island Nuclear Generating Plant
- Country: United States
- Location: Red Wing, Goodhue County, Minnesota
- Coordinates: 44°37′18″N 92°37′59″W
- Status: Operational
- Construction began: Unit 1: June 25, 1968; Unit 2: June 25, 1969
- Commission date: Unit 1: December 16, 1973; Unit 2: December 21, 1974
- Construction cost: $993.3 million (2007 USD)
- Owner: Xcel Energy
- Operator: Northern States Power Company

Nuclear power station
- Reactor type: PWR
- Reactor supplier: Westinghouse
- Cooling towers: 4 × Mechanical Draft
- Cooling source: Mississippi River
- Thermal capacity: 2 × 1677 MW_{th}

Power generation
- Units operational: 1 × 522 MW; 1 × 519 MW
- Make and model: WH 2-loop (DRYAMB)
- Nameplate capacity: 1041 MW
- Capacity factor: 95.90% (2017); 86.75% (lifetime)
- Annual net output: 9099 GWh (2021)

External links
- Website: Prairie Island Nuclear Generating Station
- Commons: Related media on Commons

The Prairie Island Nuclear Generating Plant is an electricity-generating facility located in Red Wing, Minnesota, along the Mississippi River, and adjacent to the Prairie Island Indian Community reservation.

The nuclear power plant, which began operating in 1973, has two nuclear reactors (pressurized water reactors) manufactured by Westinghouse that produce a total 1,076 megawatts of power. Units 1 and 2 are licensed by the Nuclear Regulatory Commission (NRC) to operate through 2033 and 2034, respectively. The plant is owned by Northern States Power Company (NSP), a subsidiary of Xcel Energy, and is operated by Xcel Energy.

Prairie Island is one of two nuclear power plants in Minnesota (the other being Monticello Nuclear Generating Plant in Monticello). Prairie Island has attracted controversy in the early 21st century for its operator Xcel Energy's decision to store nuclear waste in large steel casks on-site. As this area is a floodplain of the Mississippi, many opponents of the decision fear the risk of water contamination through breach of the casks during seasonal flooding of this important river. They opposed renewal of the federal license at the Prairie Island facility.

In April 2008, Xcel requested that the U.S. Nuclear Regulatory Commission (NRC) renew the licenses of both reactors, extending them for an additional twenty years. The license renewals were approved in June 2011.

The company has also requested NRC approval to use a similar storage system at its Monticello plant, which is currently licensed through 2030.

In May 2006 repair workers at the plant were exposed to very low levels of radiation due to inhalation of radioactive iodine-131 (^{131}I) gas. The gas leaked from the steam generators, which were opened for inspection. ^{131}I gas is normally removed by means of a carbon-based filter; in this case the filter had developed a small leak. The NRC deemed this event to be of very low safety significance. It said that no overdose of radiation resulted in any of the workers.

The winter net electrical generation is 560 MW (Unit 1) and 554 MW (Unit 2). The gross electrical generation for both units is 592 MW.

== Electricity production ==
Generation (MWh) of Prairie Island Nuclear Generating Station
Year	Jan	Feb	Mar	Apr	May	Jun	Jul	Aug	Sep	Oct	Nov	Dec	Annual (Total)
2001	618,437	389,471	812,451	768,863	501,550	676,953	765,082	390,035	626,635	805,604	745,222	812,402	7,912,705
2002	802,932	373,880	783,818	756,917	784,939	748,625	767,063	778,860	762,582	806,927	578,200	724,524	8,669,267
2003	806,522	732,916	800,615	684,367	783,901	750,041	775,166	767,157	509,328	634,237	781,912	811,156	8,837,318
2004	812,077	742,272	813,087	754,093	776,582	731,996	778,077	753,226	469,661	398,624	423,888	807,037	8,260,620
2005	803,697	587,802	725,050	533,350	395,669	605,329	773,229	779,765	752,870	809,297	783,285	810,958	8,360,301
2006	768,648	523,355	812,343	704,490	389,748	663,369	745,076	775,984	755,986	791,112	565,065	615,691	8,110,867
2007	810,954	732,049	677,891	688,004	594,354	745,714	775,685	779,896	742,574	815,304	787,799	760,507	8,910,731
2008	810,496	515,086	469,069	762,392	772,758	743,236	756,823	743,293	609,678	399,754	728,946	807,291	8,118,822
2009	807,196	726,201	805,405	762,882	680,521	745,867	779,578	774,487	506,146	399,117	457,420	806,141	8,250,961
2010	805,145	728,923	805,049	574,465	439,846	741,930	769,667	770,378	761,566	798,544	768,646	818,774	8,782,933
2011	818,468	739,817	815,576	757,785	372,204	597,462	748,386	783,362	774,064	586,553	794,267	814,303	8,602,247
2012	820,337	630,540	407,372	389,424	397,135	730,575	770,451	683,077	767,873	673,038	384,267	399,327	7,053,416
2013	740,979	739,154	815,212	779,072	754,238	701,865	705,139	707,944	569,678	403,634	395,787	401,441	7,714,143
2014	721,609	743,538	816,214	756,998	708,398	749,968	788,820	788,306	768,579	486,688	476,118	577,964	8,383,200
2015	750,900	577,036	498,893	421,236	653,048	631,448	786,848	790,719	770,421	610,077	393,458	490,627	7,374,711
2016	395,781	450,899	805,213	778,932	789,139	758,513	790,015	792,433	776,208	586,692	514,685	824,548	8,263,058
2017	800,052	746,308	814,592	712,816	721,001	734,256	788,068	796,150	730,330	571,144	504,490	825,524	8,744,731
2018	825,623	746,420	807,946	786,128	787,237	760,376	791,122	784,577	612,472	449,168	802,370	829,866	8,983,305
2019	830,379	749,984	826,877	767,210	796,204	768,510	794,271	792,739	709,597	469,769	803,828	830,604	9,139,972
2020	830,631	776,447	820,843	779,680	787,499	751,478	786,644	725,466	566,087	630,500	800,735	827,964	9,083,974
2021	829,359	748,821	826,536	788,422	791,957	758,411	812,448	786,454	708,566	415,370	802,809	830,760	9,099,913
2022	830,920	750,383	816,081	788,362	794,680	762,851	789,948	794,008	768,203	560,237	665,926	829,333	9,150,932
2023	830,915	748,646	830,051	789,354	726,347	572,628	789,879	786,369	761,937	294,027	0	0	7,130,153
2024	-75,709	311,670	660,507	772,807	723,733	715,996	792,424	784,713	626,812	367,902	266,413	405,559	6,352,827
2025	578,972	723,929	820,154	736,820	790,554	762,475	685,994	789,146	766,818	520,901	552,716	828,930	8,557,409
2026	828,704	694,662	827,929	783,052	756,755	761,327	731,778	784,506					--

== Surrounding population ==
The Nuclear Regulatory Commission defines two emergency planning zones around nuclear power plants: a plume exposure pathway zone has a radius of 10 miles (16 km), and is related primarily to exposure to, and inhalation of, airborne radioactive contamination. Secondly, an ingestion pathway zone with a radius of about 50 miles (80 km), is concerned primarily with ingestion of food and liquid by residents that could be contaminated by radioactivity.

The 2010 U.S. population within 10 miles (16 km) of Prairie Island was 27,996, an increase of 4.6 percent in a decade, according to an analysis of U.S. census data for MSNBC. The 2010 U.S. population within 50 miles (80 km) was 2,945,237, an increase of 7.8 percent since 2000. Cities within 50 miles include Minneapolis (39 miles to city center) and St. Paul (32 miles to city center).

== Spent fuel storage ==
NSP had initially intended to send radioactive waste from this plant to a storage facility operated by the United States federal government, but no such site is yet open for use. (The Yucca Mountain nuclear waste repository is under construction, but given strong opposition in the region, the Obama administration no longer thought this was an option.)

In 1991, Xcel Energy had requested permission from the Minnesota Public Utilities Commission to eventually store waste in 48 dry casks on the Prairie Island site. Opposition by environmentalists and the neighboring Prairie Island tribe led the Minnesota Legislature to decrease the number of allowed casks to 17; this was sufficient to keep the plant operating through approximately 2003.

When those casks filled, Xcel Energy requested that the limit be expanded beyond 17 casks. The legislature granted the request, but required the company to make greater use of renewable energy in generating power, such as wind power. In addition, it was required to pay the adjacent Prairie Island Indian Community up to $2.25 million per year to help with evacuation improvements, and the acquisition and development of new land for their reservation. In addition, this money was to help pay for a health study and emergency management activities by the small tribe.

== Steam generator replacement ==
Operators at Prairie Island Nuclear Generating Plant began a refueling outage on Unit 2 at 12:01 a.m. 9/23/2013. In addition to refueling the reactor, an expanded workforce replaced the unit's two steam generators. Unit 2 was expected to come back online within eight weeks; however, it did not resume operation until January 13, 2014. At 2 am on January 14, Unit 2 reached 100% power output.

== Seismic risk ==
The Nuclear Regulatory Commission's estimate of the risk each year of an earthquake intense enough to cause core damage to the reactor at Prairie Island was 1 in 333,333, according to an NRC study published in August 2010.

== Emergency shutdowns ==
Xcel Energy performed an emergency shutdown in late January 2015 of the Unit 1 reactor after a cloud of steam built up in the pressurized cooling system following a cooling-down process to replace a seal in one of the reactor cooling pumps. The plant returned to full power in February 2015.

Unit 2 of the plant has been shut down due to an emergency on 5 March 2015, indicated by a fire alarm at 4:00 am CST. Xcel energy plant operators declared a “notification of an unusual event,” the lowest of four emergency classifications established by the U.S. Nuclear Regulatory Commission.

Unit 2 shut down automatically on December 17, 2015, due to a turbine problem, and the fire alarm went off at the time. Operators declared a "notification of unusual event".

On May 27, 2023, Xcel Energy reported that Prairie Island Unit 2 automatically shut down after an "unusual event" was declared due to a malfunctioning external transformer. This triggered fire alarms, though no fire was found, nor was there a safety threat to staff or the public. Resident inspectors from the U.S. Nuclear Regulatory Commission (NRC) verified that the plant was in a safe condition. Unit 1 continued normal operations, and Unit 2 was expected to resume service later that week pending repairs and standard restart procedures.

Prairie Island Unit 2 was taken offline on November 22, 2023, for its routine refueling cycle. Shortly thereafter, Unit 1 was shut down due to an electrical issue between the turbine and the electric grid. Xcel Energy said the power plant outage would last until January but would not affect customer service.

== Hydrogen production ==
Prairie Island will start producing green hydrogen from high-temperature electrolysis. Xcel Energy is going to build two natural gas power plants that can use a mix of 30% hydrogen. Natural gas power plants could be replaced/retrofitted with combined cycle hydrogen power plants to transition away from hydrocarbons. Ships and trains could also run on hydrogen fuel cells.

== See also ==
- Monticello Nuclear Power Plant
- Elk River Station (decommissioned)
