= Northern States Power Company =

Former publicly traded S&P 500 electric and natural gas utility holding company

Northern States Power Company (NYSE: NSP) was a publicly traded S&P 500 electric and natural gas utility holding company based in Minneapolis, Minnesota, that is now a subsidiary of Xcel Energy (NYSE: XEL).

== History ==
The company's founder, Henry Marison Byllesby, had worked for two electric utility industry pioneers before getting into the business for himself. He was one of Thomas Edison's draftsmen when the Pearl Street Station was being built. He then worked for George Westinghouse, starting as a sales agent and working his way up to vice president of Westinghouse Electric & Manufacturing Co. Byllesby's next job was with the Thomson-Houston Co. (one of General Electric's two predecessors) before moving to Chicago in 1902 and establishing the H. M. Byllesby Co., which provided engineering and management services to electric utilities.

Byllesby acquired the Stillwater Gas & Electric Co. of Stillwater, Minnesota, in 1909, and reorganized it as the Washington County Light & Power Co. This was the first company added to Byllesby's Consumers Power Co., which then added three companies in North Dakota in 1910: (Minot Light & Telephone Co., Red River Power Co., and Union Light, Heating, & Power Co.). Over the next few years, Consumers Power Co. grew rapidly as companies across the Twin Cities and central Minnesota were acquired and linked with transmission lines. These lines linked Minneapolis, St. Paul, Shakopee, Faribault, Mankato, Northfield, Coon Rapids, Rockford, Delano, Watertown, and further places such as Crookston and Pipestone. The last addition to the company's territory was when a group of towns around Waconia was acquired from Interstate Power Co. in 1956.

In 1916, the company changed its name to Northern States Power Co. to avoid confusion with company by the same name in Michigan. The company acquired the Minneapolis General Electric Co. the same year, and continued its acquisitions, with 42 more systems added over the next seven years. The company has always been publicly traded, and which consistently did well enough to pay a cash dividend to shareholders every year since 1910.

While the bulk of the company's territory has always been in Minnesota, it has some territory in and around the larger towns in North Dakota (Minot, Grand Forks, and Fargo) as well as southeastern South Dakota (Sioux Falls area). Its territory also extends east across Wisconsin and into the upper peninsula of Michigan, but due to state regulations requiring local ownership of all utilities, this portion of the territory is operated as a separate subsidiary: Northern States Power-Wisconsin.

The company built numerous power plants, many of which have since been retired and decommissioned. Some capacity was extended with transmission lines and substations. The currently operational nuclear power plants are Prairie Island (1974), and Monticello Nuclear Generating Plant (1971). Sherburne County Generating Station (Sherco) and Allen S. King in Bayport are the last to be fueled by coal. Three other coal-fired plants, Riverside, High Bridge, and Black Dog, have been retrofitted to run on natural gas.

By 1986, the company had grown to be included among the S&P 500 list of 500 of the largest companies in the United States. By that time it had accumulated nearly $1.2 billion in long-term debt. NSP served the agriculturally based region of its headquarters state of Minnesota, and also the neighboring states of North Dakota and South Dakota to the west. These territories were served through its subsidiary, NSP-Minnesota.

=== Primergy merger ===
On May 3, 1995, Northern States Power Company and Wisconsin Energy Corporation (NYSE: WEC) each filed a Securities and Exchange Commission Form 8-K to combine in a merger-of-equals transaction to form Primergy Corporation, which would be a registered public utility holding company, and to be the new parent of both NSP and of the operating subsidiaries of WEC. It would be the tenth largest investor-owned electric and gas utility company in the United States, based on market capitalization at that time of about US$6.0 billion, and with 1994 combined revenues of US$4.2 billion and with total assets of more than US$10.0 billion. Shareholders of NSP common stock would own 1.626 shares of stock of Primergy for each share of NSP stock they owned, and WEC shareholders were to receive one-for-one shares of Primergy.

At that time, Richard A. Abdoo, served as chairman, president and chief executive officer of Wisconsin Energy. James J. Howard served in the same positions with Northern States Power. With the new Primergy Corporation, Howard would become chairman and CEO, and Abdoo would serve as vice chairman, president and chief operating officer. Further, with Howard scheduled to retire in July 2000, Abdoo would then succeed him as chairman of Primergy.

Wisconsin Energy's two then-existing utility subsidiaries, Wisconsin Electric Power Company (WEPCO) and Wisconsin Natural Gas Company (WNG) were to be consolidated under a new subsidiary name, Wisconsin Energy Company. Under that name, it and Northern States Power Company would continue to operate as the two principal subsidiaries of Primergy Corp. Also, NSP-Wisconsin would merge into the operating subsidiary Wisconsin Energy Company. The headquarters of the two utilities would remain distinct and separate in their existing respective state locations--Milwaukee for Wisconsin Energy and Minneapolis for NSP. The merged company would have been headquartered in Minneapolis (with NSP as the nominal survivor), but incorporated in Wisconsin. The Primergy board of directors were to be equally split, composed of six from each company. The merger deal was expected to be completed in the fourth quarter of 1996.

By 1997, approvals had been granted by the state regulatory commissions in Michigan and North Dakota, but not by the commissions in Minnesota and Wisconsin. Approvals from the Securities & Exchange Commission and the U.S. Department of Justice were still pending.

On May 16, 1997, both CEOs announced that the boards of directors of both companies had voted that day to terminate the merger plan. Howard stated that the problem was that the regulatory agencies were changing their merger policies as they were considering the companies's filing. Howard blamed the Federal Energy Regulatory Commission, which had issued a decision earlier in the week remanding the case back to the companies, for further negotiation among themselves. "There is simply no end to this process in sight," stated Howard. Abdoo said the decision to end the merger factored in that after two years of already waiting, the further likely wait of at least six months of delay would significantly reduce the benefits of the Primergy transaction.

The delay had put the merger five months behind schedule and had reduced earnings for both utilities by a total of US$58 million to that point, costs which had not been passed on to consumers. Adding to the discomfort was a growing gap between the performance of the two companies by early 1997. Wisconsin Energy's stock had by then fallen about 13% since early 1995 when the deal had been announced, due to other ongoing problems that had developed within the company, including issues with its Point Beach Nuclear Generating Station in Manitowoc County, Wisconsin. But Northern States Power's stock had risen by 6%. The case was considered to be a bellwether in the utilities industry, putting an end to the rapid pace of mergers and acquisitions that had been ongoing up to then.

=== Xcel merger ===
However, in 1998, after the failed Primergy merger, NSP merged with New Century Energies of Denver, owner of Public Service Company of Colorado and Southwestern Public Service, to form Xcel Energy.

== See also ==
- St. Anthony Falls Hydroelectric Development - Northern States Power

NSP is the successor to several companies that developed hydroelectric power, starting as early as 1852, at St. Anthony Falls, Minneapolis, Minnesota. As a result NSP acquired and operated three hydroelectric power plants at the falls and just downstream, all built by 1908. One of the plants is still operating.

== Additional resources ==
- The Historical Records of Northern States Power Company's predecessors are available for research use at the Minnesota Historical Society.
