= Monticello Nuclear Generating Plant =

Nuclear power plant in Monticello, Minnesota

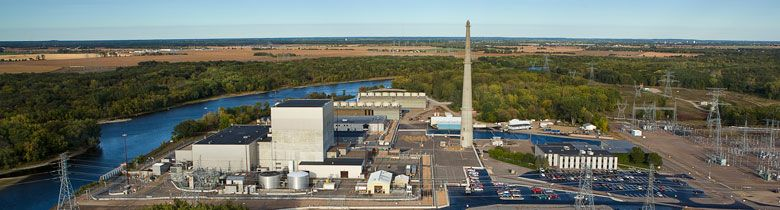
- View of Xcel Energy's Monticello Nuclear Generating Plant from the West.
- Country: United States
- Location: Monticello, Wright County, Minnesota
- Coordinates: 45°20′1″N 93°50′57″W
- Status: Operational
- Construction began: June 19, 1967
- Commission date: June 30, 1971
- Construction cost: $455.8 million (2007 USD)
- Owner: Xcel Energy
- Operator: Northern States Power Company

Nuclear power station
- Reactor type: BWR
- Reactor supplier: General Electric
- Cooling towers: 2 × Mechanical Draft
- Cooling source: Mississippi River
- Thermal capacity: 1 × 2004 MW_{th}

Power generation
- Units operational: 1 × 647 MW
- Make and model: BWR-3 (Mark 1)
- Nameplate capacity: 647 MW
- Capacity factor: 91.04% (2017); 80.80% (lifetime)
- Annual net output: 5022 GWh (2021)

External links
- Website: Monticello Nuclear Generating Station
- Commons: Related media on Commons

The Monticello Nuclear Generating Plant is a nuclear power plant located in Monticello, Minnesota, along the Mississippi River. The site, which began operating in 1971, has a single nuclear reactor (boiling water reactor) of the General Electric BWR-3 design generating 671 MWe. The plant is owned by Xcel Energy and operated by Northern States Power, its regional subsidiary.

The reactor was originally licensed until 2010; a renewal license issued in 2006 has allowed it to continue operating until September 8, 2030. In January 2023, Northern States Power Company applied for a license renewal of 20 years beyond 2030.

License for operation was renewed until 2050.

== Regulatory history ==
Monticello Nuclear Generating Plant began operating in 1971, has a single boiling water reactor of the General Electric BWR-3 design generating 671 MWe. The nuclear reactor was originally licensed until 2010; a renewal license issued in 2006 allows it to continue operating until September 8, 2030.

In January 2023, Northern States Power Company applied for a license renewal of 20 years beyond 2030.

== Geography, seismic risk and surrounding population ==
The Nuclear Regulatory Commission (NRC) defines two emergency planning zones around nuclear power plants: a plume exposure pathway zone with a radius of 10 miles (16 km), concerned primarily with exposure to, and inhalation of, airborne radioactive contamination, and an ingestion pathway zone of about 50 miles (80 km), concerned primarily with ingestion of food and liquid contaminated by radioactivity. The NRC's estimate of the risk each year of an earthquake intense enough to cause core damage to the reactor at Monticello was 1 in 52,632, according to an NRC study published in August 2010.

According to the 2010 U.S. Census, the population was 62,976 within 10 miles (16 km) of Monticello, an increase of 36.5 percent in a decade; and 2,977,934 within 50 miles (80 km), an increase of 8.6 percent. Cities within 50 miles include the Twin Cities of Minneapolis (38 miles to city center) and St. Paul (45 miles to city center).

The Monticello section of the Mississippi River remains unfrozen during winter and attracts hundreds of trumpeter swans, largely due to warm water discharged by the nuclear plant.

== Incidents and updates ==
In November 1971, 50,000 gallons of "low-level" radioactive water was released into the Mississippi River by the facility in order to conduct repairs.

8,500 gallons of cesium-137 contaminated water were released into the Mississippi River by the facility on December 20, 1971 in order to conduct maintenance, and a second amount totaling 5,000 gallons from the same batch was released on December 29, 1971.

Roughly 1,300 gallons (4.9 cubic meters) of radioactive water which accidentally leaked from the plant into the Mississippi River in an incident on 5 May 1982, was determined to be "no threat" to the public.

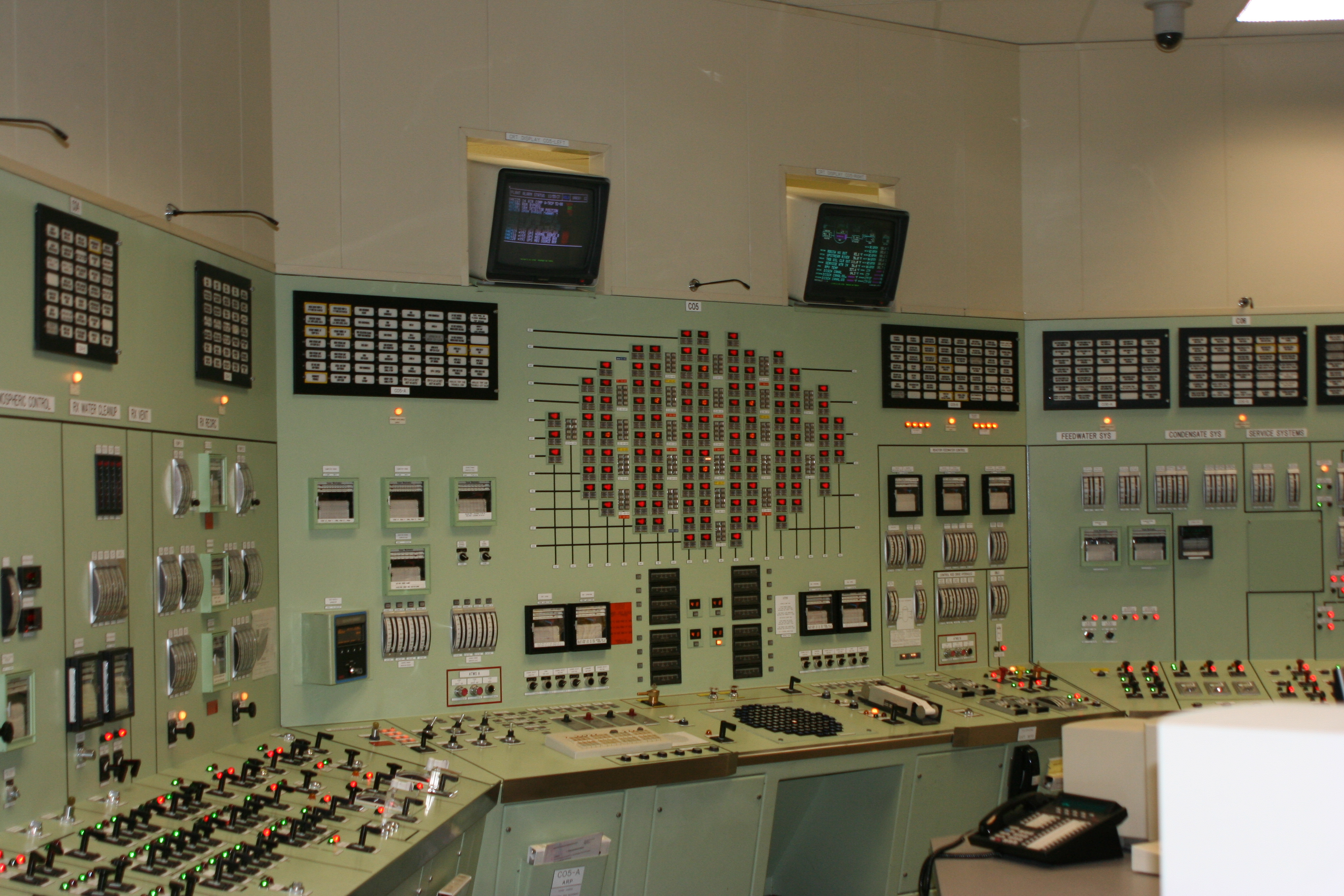
The Monticello Nuclear Power Plant Control Room Simulator

=== 21st century ===
In January 2007 a 13-ton control box fell eight to twelve inches and caused an unexpected shutdown. This control box was located in the condenser room of the turbine building and contained valves which controlled steam pressure. Emergency response teams at the station deemed that the event was likely caused by inadequate welds at the time of installation and fatigue due to vibrations over the life of the plant.

Construction of the on-site independent spent fuel storage installation (ISFSI) pad began in June 2007. The target date for the completion of the pads was December 2007 with insertion of the first ten dry storage containers (holding spent fuel assemblies) into horizontal storage modules (HSMs) in mid-2008. Initially, 12 HSMs will be placed on the storage pad. Each HSM—a thick, reinforced, pre-cast concrete structure about the size of a single car garage—has the capacity to hold 61 fuel bundles.

On September 11, 2008, a cable fault tripped the transformer which supplied power to the site. This resulted in a loss of off-site power and the plant automatically shut down.

On September 18, 2008, an employee for a rental equipment company was electrocuted by one phase of the 115-kV power line outside of the plant due to a lack of situational awareness. The individual was raising a bucket lift without watching overhead and contacted one phase of the 115-kV line. The plant was offline at the time due to the forced outage described above.

In February 2011, the site's plant officials determined that four control rod blades could be affected by a potentially substantial safety hazard. Vice President Tim O'Connor indicated that the blades would be replaced in March.

In 2006, Xcel Energy proposed a series of upgrades to the plant in order to increase its output and extend its life for an additional 20 years. In December 2013, the Nuclear Regulatory Commission approved the license amendment allowing the unit to increase output from 600 MWe to 671 MWe. However, final project implementation costs significantly outstripped initial estimates by more than $400 million. In 2015, the Minnesota Public Utilities Commission denied full cost recovery and determined that, while Xcel Energy could include the additional cost in customer rates, it could not earn a return on those costs. Xcel Energy would record a greater than $100 million loss in 1Q 2015 as a result and recouped $27 million less than expected from the project.

In March 2013, the plant was shut down for a routine refueling. During this time, workers replaced several original plant components. This increased the plant's electrical output from the original 600 MWe to 671 MWe. In early August, the plant was brought back online with the new equipment. Refueling outages as such increase the population of the plant's workforce by the thousands.

Tritium-leak: In November 2022, water contaminated with tritium leaked from a water pipe running between two buildings at the facility. Initial estimates placed the leaked water volume at 400,000 US gallons (1,500,000 L), but this estimate was later increased to 750,000 to 900,000 US gallons (2,800,000 to 3,400,000 L) Only 25% of the released tritium was recovered as of March 16, 2023, with cleanup continuing. Another leak of hundreds of gallons of tritium-laced water, originating from a short-term fix for the original leak, was discovered on March 22. Xcel announced that the nuclear plant would be powered down on March 24, 2023, to cut out a leaking 50-year-old pipe to repair the ongoing leak. Xcel president Chris Clark said that "there is always a risk that it would spill over again and have more tritium enter the groundwater."

In December 2023, Xcel Energy was fined $14,000 by the Minnesota Pollution Control Agency for not obtaining a permit before pumping contaminated groundwater into temporary holding tanks.

Xcel Energy's estimate of its November 2022 leak of cooling water was 400,000 gallons, but this was more than doubled in December 2024, according to Monticello Times. The correct estimate of 829,000 gallons is used repeatedly by Xcel and by the Nuclear Regulatory Commission in documentation and environmental reports filed in regard to the 20-year operating license extension that the 54-year-old reactor was recently granted by the NRC.

== Electricity production ==
Generation (MWh) of Monticello Nuclear Facility
Year	Jan	Feb	Mar	Apr	May	Jun	Jul	Aug	Sep	Oct	Nov	Dec	Annual (Total)
2001	440,695	340,547	-4,261	369,313	431,818	417,928	422,760	415,031	411,801	396,154	21,897	212,639	3,876,322
2002	349,057	396,128	438,866	423,484	438,208	409,953	421,673	423,789	416,914	434,384	424,937	438,164	5,015,557
2003	436,483	393,223	437,856	345,599	50,496	369,107	424,318	420,302	416,377	436,020	424,869	421,860	4,576,510
2004	433,230	408,757	440,422	424,219	423,616	350,104	420,318	425,000	412,488	436,433	423,677	436,618	5,034,882
2005	436,233	363,285	42,698	228,534	436,029	413,038	420,637	421,445	414,350	437,081	423,304	438,284	4,474,918
2006	437,266	393,609	437,954	421,222	433,091	407,403	411,732	419,876	414,853	437,102	423,707	434,736	5,072,551
2007	232,813	391,535	173,046	6,240	420,460	414,784	424,641	425,406	420,682	439,692	407,935	435,035	4,192,269
2008	440,240	411,395	439,697	425,502	436,396	415,071	422,351	421,789	170,136	436,652	423,091	435,696	4,878,016
2009	400,966	390,162	168,280	-2,230	247,583	413,210	421,814	420,893	410,568	420,808	418,648	431,762	4,142,464
2010	433,518	390,894	432,633	414,429	423,908	402,835	413,871	398,564	389,641	402,295	163,540	428,985	4,695,113
2011	434,903	391,689	49,550	-2,209	45,668	337,853	415,665	387,105	414,046	328,906	264,265	288,837	3,356,278
2012	434,444	404,751	431,898	418,218	426,910	404,834	410,886	307,057	367,237	431,231	420,039	432,869	4,890,374
2013	426,909	391,008	6,649	-1,399	-2,103	-1,208	71,069	412,756	408,379	431,803	419,876	429,835	2,993,574
2014	234,943	314,811	447,228	417,881	424,344	405,108	416,025	415,937	326,596	137,408	338,787	444,898	4,323,966
2015	462,652	420,166	465,432	156,356	2,466	418,819	470,732	477,996	462,826	492,735	357,253	476,462	4,663,895
2016	491,040	458,648	488,124	475,660	486,354	457,486	473,065	475,297	361,809	459,478	478,102	492,695	5,597,758
2017	486,644	443,965	480,983	175,184	252,980	449,491	473,963	478,975	464,544	490,160	475,734	486,997	5,159,620
2018	490,435	443,250	489,058	472,836	481,527	456,816	469,899	461,713	462,405	490,370	410,489	489,226	5,618,024
2019	469,517	392,464	387,120	132,626	263,845	460,683	469,176	473,507	463,668	488,998	474,910	488,061	4,964,575
2020	489,487	456,926	483,706	468,628	473,907	444,350	445,849	465,947	457,069	445,779	474,407	487,259	5,593,314
2021	479,432	435,017	439,966	203,430	157,540	454,863	464,321	480,624	465,120	484,214	473,243	485,088	5,022,858
2022	389,831	440,998	484,256	472,089	452,801	458,182	468,783	470,786	459,056	485,719	472,727	490,045	5,545,273
2023	487,762	440,350	341,230	158,956	246,782	456,685	469,864	470,532	399,936	380,577	474,207	466,618	4,793,499
2024	489,290	431,747	360,914	461,957	483,325	456,714	466,819	469,418	449,794	483,874	473,765	464,167	5,491,784
2025	486,409	438,052	401,461	258,107	72,500	349,290	423,806	346,434	457,206	481,144	474,246	467,257	4,655,912
2026	485,009	307,225	-2,599	394,056	482,347	454,937	416,264	103,111					--

== See also ==
- List of power stations in Minnesota
