= Xcel Energy =

American utility company

Xcel Energy Inc.

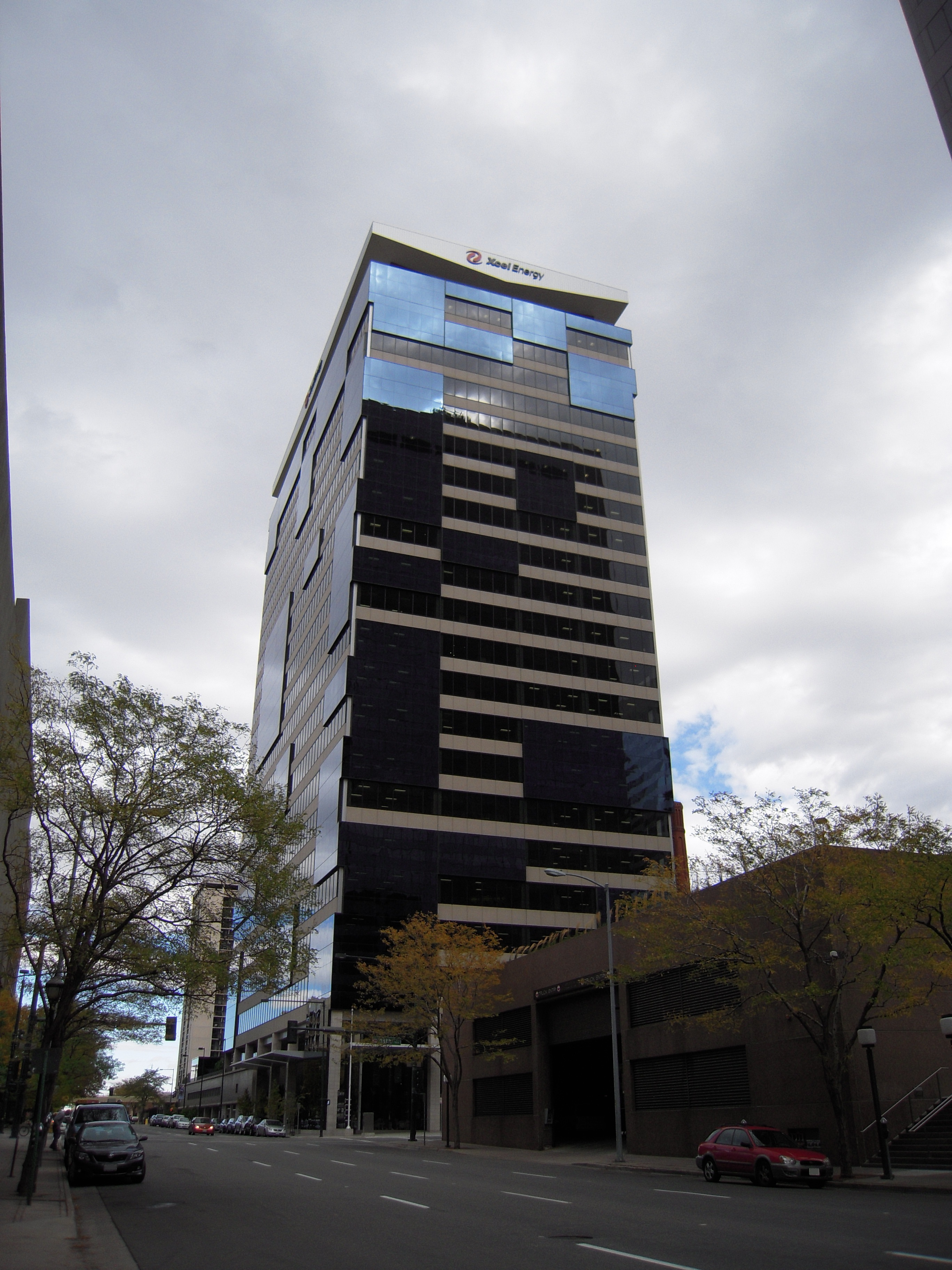
- 1800 Larimer, Xcel Energy Regional Headquarters, in Denver, Colorado
- Type: Public
- Traded as: Nasdaq: XEL; DJUA component; Nasdaq-100 component; S&P 500 component
- Industry: Utilities
- Founded: June 17, 1909; 117 years ago in Stillwater, Minnesota, U.S. (as Washington County Light & Power Company)
- Founder: H.M. Byllesby
- Headquarters: Minneapolis, Minnesota, U.S.
- Area served: NSPM: Minnesota, North Dakota, and South Dakota; NSPW: Michigan and Wisconsin; PSCo: Colorado; SPS: New Mexico and Texas
- Key people: Robert C. Frenzel (chairman, president, and CEO); Timothy O'Connor (Executive VP and COO); Brian J. Van Abel (Executive VP and CFO)
- Products: Electric Power; Natural Gas
- Production output: Electric: 114.98 TWh; Natural Gas: 406.74 TBtu; (2023)
- Revenue: ▼US$13.44 billion (2024)
- Operating income: ▼US$2.386 billion (2024)
- Net income: ▲US$1.936 billion (2024)
- Total assets: ▲US$70.04 billion (2024)
- Total equity: ▲US$19.52 billion (2024)
- Number of employees: 11,380 (2024)
- Subsidiaries: Northern States Power Company (Minnesota); Northern States Power Company (Wisconsin); Public Service Company of Colorado; Southwestern Public Service Company; NRG Energy (1992–2003)
- Website: my.xcelenergy.com

Xcel Energy Inc. is a U.S. regulated electric utility and natural gas delivery company based in Minneapolis, Minnesota, serving approximately 3.9 million electricity customers and 2.2 million natural gas customers across parts of eight states as of mid-2025. It consists of four operating subsidiaries: Northern States Power-Minnesota, Northern States Power-Wisconsin, Public Service Company of Colorado, and Southwestern Public Service Co.

In December 2018, Xcel Energy announced it would deliver 100 percent clean, carbon-free electricity by 2050, with an 80 percent carbon reduction by 2035 (from 2005 levels). This makes Xcel the first major US utility to set such a goal.

== History ==
Xcel Energy was built on three companies: Minneapolis-based Northern States Power Company (NSP), Denver-based Public Service Company of Colorado (PSCo), and Amarillo-based Southwestern Public Service (SPS). Southwestern Public Service Co. (SPS) dates its origins to 1904 and the Pecos Valley in New Mexico when Maynard Gunsell received an electricity franchise for the city of Roswell, New Mexico and its 2,000 residents. The financial strain of creating this new enterprise soon overwhelmed him and he sold the franchise to W.H. Gillenwater, who named his utility the Roswell Electric Light Co. He later sold the company to an investment firm in Cleveland, Ohio, which already owned the Roswell Gas Co.

Northern States Power Company's timeline begins with the organization of the Washington County Light & Power Co. in 1909. When H. M. Byllesby began building his utility holding company across the Northwestern region of the US, he renamed it the Consumers Power Co. in 1910 and which was renamed the Northern States Power Co. in 1916. While the bulk of NSP's territory grew across central and southern Minnesota (starting from the Twin Cities), it acquired territory in North Dakota (centering on Fargo, Grand Forks, and Minot) and extended southwest into South Dakota (centering on Sioux Falls). NSP's system also extended east into Wisconsin, but because of utility ownership laws in that state, it was operated as an entity separate from the rest of the company.

Public Service Company of Colorado (PSCo) was formed in 1923 to provide an electric generating station for the Denver area. By 1924, it had acquired most of the electric companies in northern and central Colorado. Originally a subsidiary of Cities Service Company, it became an independent autonomous operation in November 1943. By this time, it served 80 percent of Colorado's gas and electricity needs. As demand for energy continued to grow, so did PSCo. Eventually, the company merged with SPS to form New Century Energies (NCE) in 1995.

Northern States Power and Wisconsin Energy Corporation had planned to merge into a new outfit that was to be called Primergy - but in 1997, the merger fell through because of the time it was taking to gain the required approvals from state and federal agencies. After the failed Primergy merger, NSP (both the Minnesota and Wisconsin companies) merged with New Century Energies to form Xcel Energy. In 2005, Xcel sold Cheyenne Light, Fuel and Power to Black Hills Corporation. Cheyenne Light, Fuel and Power had been a subsidiary of PSCo since the 1920s, and had become an operating company of NCE after the merger with SPS.

In December 2018, Xcel Energy became the first major US utility to pledge to go carbon-free, aiming for 80% carbon reduction by 2030, and 100% reduction by 2050.

Utility industry magazine Utility Dive awarded Xcel Energy its 2018 "Utility of the Year" award for its plans for add 12 wind farms, its project with Google to develop new ways for customers to personalize energy management, and its plan to retire 50 percent of its coal-powered capacity by 2026 (and replacing it with a combination of renewable energy, efficiency, and natural gas).

On May 20, 2019, Xcel Energy announced its intent to close all of its remaining coal-fired plants in Minnesota by 2030 while compensating by increasing solar production capacity by 1,400%. It also declared its plans to continue operating its Monticello nuclear plant near Monticello, Minnesota, until at least 2040.

In February 2026, Xcel Energy requested approval from the Colorado Public Utilities Commission for significant electric and gas rate increases of around 10% and 11% respectively to cover infrastructure investments, drawing protests from some customers who argued the utility’s profits and past investments should reduce the need for higher bills.

Xcel Energy submitted a proposal in March 2026 to change the cost of powering their operations. The "large load tariff" plan sets higher rates for big power users such as large commercial customers and data centers. At the time there were 56 data centers in Colorado, with many more under construction, which will require enormous amounts of energy.

In February 2026, Xcel Energy and Google announced plans to add 300 MW/30 GWh of iron-air battery storage supplied by Form Energy to Xcel's Upper Midwest grid, alongside 1,400 MW of wind and 200 MW of solar generation. The project is intended to support a Google data center in Minnesota.

== Generation portfolio ==
Annual Portion of Xcel Energy's Generation from Carbon-Free Sources over Time
Xcel's Energy Capacity by Source Type 2023
1. Coal (19.0%)
2. Natural Gas (30.0%)
3. Nuclear (10.0%)
4. Wind (32.0%)
5. Solar (4.00%)
6. Other (5.00%)

Xcel Energy primarily provides energy from wind, natural gas, and coal. Carbon-free energy accounted for 50% of its total electricity generation in 2023, with wind and nuclear as the largest contributors.

It has also lowered its greenhouse gas emissions by reducing coal consumption in favor of natural gas. Xcel plans to continue this trend by converting some coal plants to natural gas and closing others. Some environmental activists argue that Xcel is not acting on plans to stop using coal plants fast enough.

Xcel Energy owns and operates three wind farms. In October 2011, Xcel Energy set a world record for electricity from wind power, with an hourly penetration of 55.6% of production from wind. At peak generation wind is the largest source of energy capacity for Xcel.

Xcel Energy owns and operates two nuclear power plants:

- Monticello Nuclear Generating Plant near Monticello, Minnesota
- Prairie Island Nuclear Generating Plant near Red Wing, Minnesota

and stores the spent fuel from these nuclear plants on site in independent spent fuel storage installations. (ISFSIs).

Biomass electricity comes from organic fuel sources. Xcel Energy has contracts for about 110 megawatts of electricity from biomass generators. Two in northern Minnesota are fueled by forest harvest residue, such as treetops and limbs. A third facility, brought on line in 2007 in western Minnesota, generates power using turkey litter.

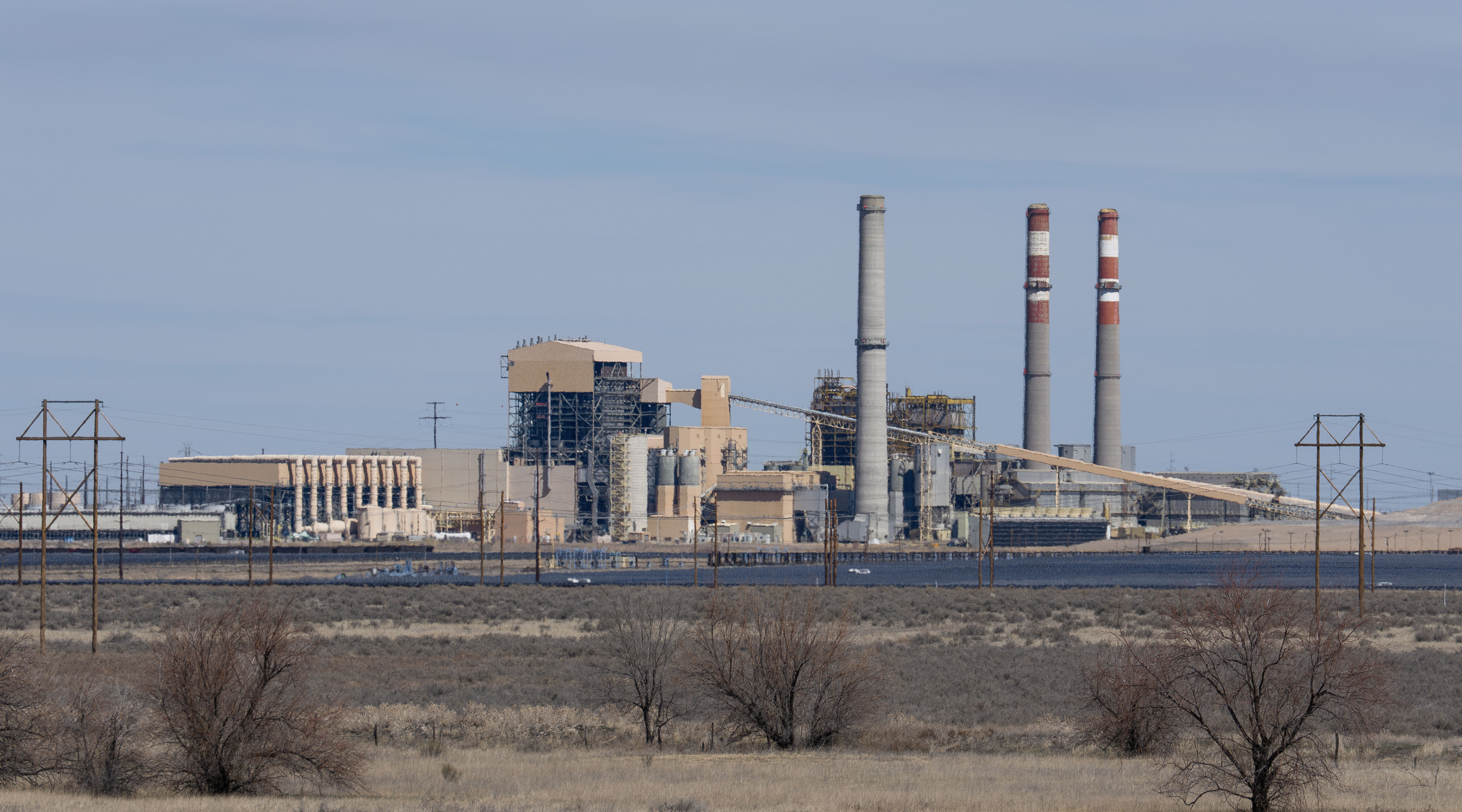
Comanche Generating Station in Pueblo, Colorado

Xcel Energy's Bay Front plant in Ashland, Wisconsin, is a three-unit generating station that has become a model for the creative use of fuels: coal, waste wood, railroad ties, discarded tires, natural gas, and petroleum coke. Two of the three Bay Front operating units already use biomass as their primary fuel. Xcel Energy recently proposed a plan to install biomass gasification technology at Bay Front. The waste-to-energy facilities use waste that would otherwise end up in landfills. The Wisconsin waste-to-energy plant burns wood waste in combination with refuse-derived fuel (RDF).

== Transmission and Distribution ==
=== Transmission ===
Electric power transmission refers to the high voltage power lines for long distance transport of electric energy. Xcel Energy owns and operates approximately 111,000 miles of electric transmission lines, along with an extensive distribution network, as of 2025. Xcel has proposed significant plans for updating its transmission system with a budget of $7.4 billion from 2022-2027.

The Colorado Power Pathway, approved by regulators in 2022, gives Xcel $1.7 billion to expand transmission infrastructure in eastern Colorado. One proposal in Colorado involved nearly $3 billion in new investment. Construction is subcontracted to Quanta Infrastructure Services Group. Current timelines have most of the project being completed by 2027.

Another proposal in Colorado involved nearly $3 billion in new investment. This was more than nine times the state budget and in addition to the budget for the Colorado Power Pathway program.

Expanding the transmission infrastructure is important for adding new renewable systems to the grid. However the cost can be significant. Colorado regulators did not approve Xcel's plan to build additional transmission in Baca County which is a large potential wind energy generator. Instead, they sought proposals that involve constructing renewable energy sources connected to the existing grid.

In Minnesota, the budget for a new 465 mile transmission line doubled to $1.14 billion and Xcel cited inflationary pressures. Opponents of Colorado's Power Pathway Program highlighted that cost overruns in transmission construction will be pushed to consumers. The Federal Energy Information Administration stated in 2023 that transmission lines typically cost $1.17 million to $8.62 million per mile.

Under the Power for the Plains Initiative, Xcel Energy built hundreds of miles of transmission lines and substations totaling $3 billion in investment. The lines supply Kiowa NM, Lubbock TX, and connect other towns in the Texas panhandle.

The transmission system is operated on a non-discriminatory basis under the open access requirements of the Federal Government. This means that all wholesale buyers and sellers of electricity can use the transmission system under the same terms and conditions used to serve Xcel Energy's own retail customers.

=== Grid security ===
In 2017, Xcel Energy partnered with the Financial Services Information Sharing and Analysis Center to create a new "threat information sharing community" intended to share cyber and physical security intelligence with the energy sector. The new community is called the Energy Analytic Security Exchange (EASE). It is run by the FS-ISAC Sector Services team; FS-ISAC is an organization that gathers cyber and physical risk intelligence for the financial services industry. Additionally, the North American Electric Reliability Council (NERC) manages the Electricity Information Sharing and Analysis Center, which is another resource that the energy sector uses to gather threat intelligence.

==== Advanced Grid in Colorado ====
In 2016, Xcel Energy announced the Advanced Grid Intelligence and Security (AGIS) initiative, a long-term effort related to power reliability, distributed generation, and information sharing with customers. Through the initiative, Xcel would build an "intelligent grid" in Colorado in order to improve grid security. The company filed a request for permission with the Colorado Public Utilities Commission for the program, which would cost $500 million.

== Programs ==
Since 1998, Xcel Energy's Windsource program has allowed customers to designate that part or all of their electricity comes from a renewable energy source. In 2015, about 96,000 people were enrolled in Windsource. In 2011, more than 2.3 million electric and 261,800 natural gas customers took part in Xcel Energy's energy efficiency programs for homes and businesses.

Xcel Energy also offers customers incentives to install solar panels. At the end of 2011, more than 10,600 photovoltaic systems had been installed, with a capacity of about 121 megawatts (DC). In early 2011, Xcel Energy suspended the solar rebate program before reaching a settlement a month later with representatives of solar power companies to restore the solar incentive program until it is fully reviewed by the Public Utilities Commission.

== Controversies ==
On August 1, 2002, Xcel Energy Inc. was sued because of engaging in "round-trip" energy trades that provided no economic benefit for the company, and because the company lacked the necessary internal controls to adequately monitor the trading of its power. Xcel paid $80,000,000 in a settlement.

=== Nuclear waste, radioactive water management ===
The parent company to Xcel Energy, and later Xcel Energy itself have operated the Prairie Island Nuclear Power Plant since 1973. Over that time, nuclear waste produced by the power plant has been stored adjacent to the Prairie Island Indian Community. The homes of some members of the community are within 600 yards of the nuclear waste containment site. The island is very vulnerable to seasonal flooding because it is on the bank of the Mississippi River. While in 1991, the Minnesota Public Utilities Commission capped the storage of nuclear waste on the island to 17 casks, the legislature has since permitted this number to increase. Environmentalists and members of the Prairie Island Indian Community have been working since 1994 to have this nuclear waste transported away from their reservation due to the combined risk of the temporary design of the storage facility, unpredictable flooding and single evacuation road in the event nuclear waste is released from containment.

On March 16, 2023, Xcel Energy announced that a significant unplanned release of radioactive water from its Monticello nuclear power plant took place on November 21, 2022, which was reported only to state and federal authorities but was concealed from the public until then. Xcel estimated the leak to be 400 thousand gallons of contaminated water containing radioactive tritium. The leak occurred in a water pipe that runs between two buildings.

=== Fires ===
The Cabin Creek Fire occurred on October 2, 2007, at Xcel Energy's Hydropower Generation plant in Georgetown, Colorado. On June 1, 2011, Federal prosecutors opened their charges that Xcel Energy was criminally liable for the deaths of the five RPI workers. The jury found Xcel Energy not guilty. On December 19, 2011, RPI Coating plead guilty to workplace safety violations and paid $1.55 million in a cash settlement. The company took responsibility for the deaths of five workers and the injuries to three.

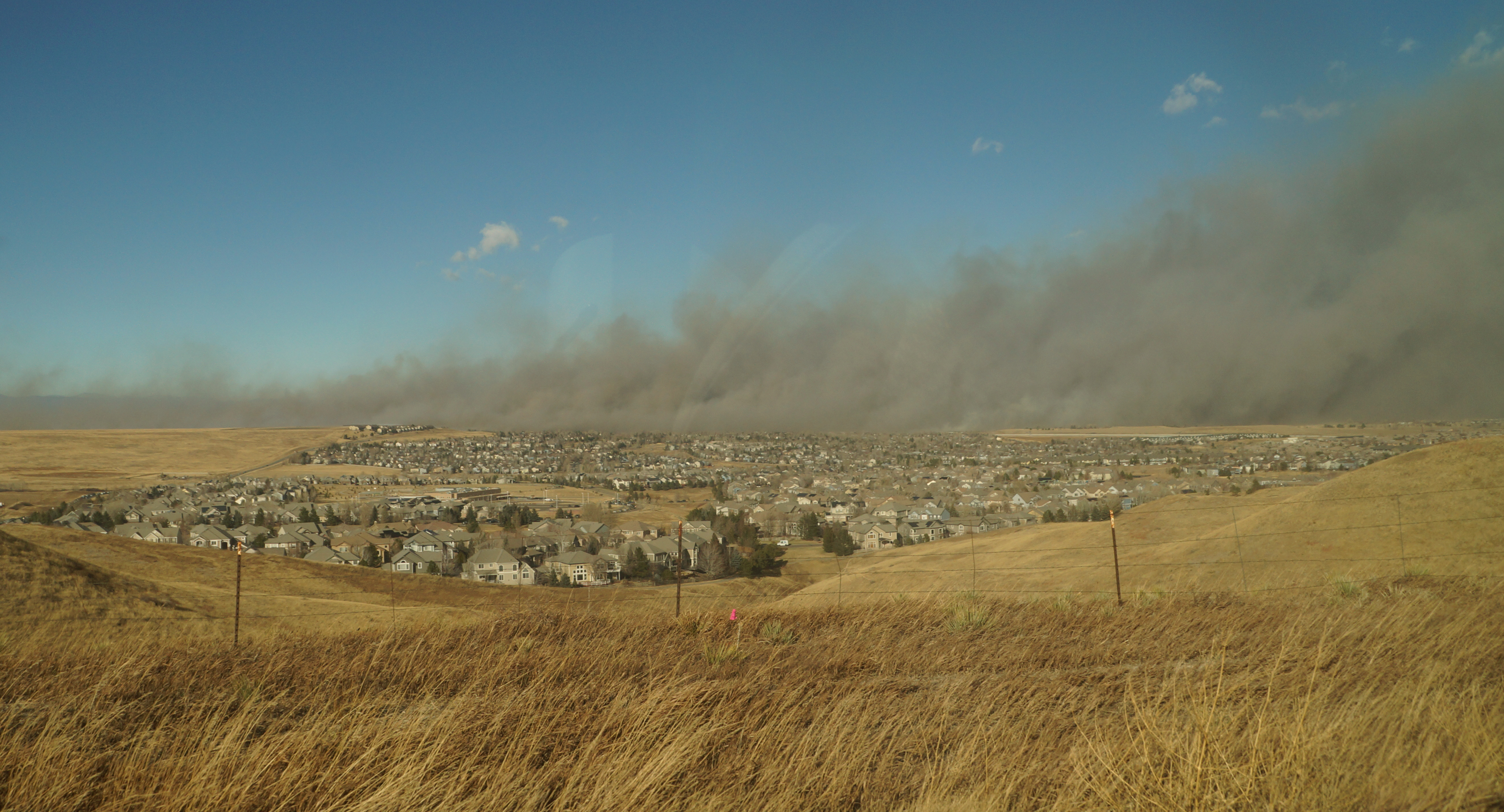
Large plumes of smoke are visible over Superior around 2:00 PM MST on December 30. View from State Highway 128, looking north.

Xcel Energy faces nearly 300 lawsuits filed by homeowners, businesses, and local governments over the Marshall Fire as of early 2024, which started on December 30, 2021 in Boulder County and impacted the communities of Superior and Louisville. Two people died and more than 1,000 homes and commercial properties were destroyed, resulting in more than $2 billion in property damage. It was the most destructive wildfire in Colorado history. The official investigation blamed the fire on a loose wire owned by Xcel and a week-old fire started by members of the Twelve Tribes that was smoldering.

Following the Smokehouse Creek Fire in the Texas Panhandle, which began February 26, 2024, Xcel Energy acknowledged that its facilities played a role in the ignition of the fire. The fire became the largest wildfire in Texas history, burning more than one million acres, resulting in at least two confirmed deaths and significant agricultural and livestock damage. An investigation by the Texas A&M Forest Service found that power lines ignited the fire. In February 2026, a Texas judge ordered Xcel to replace damaged wooden electric distribution poles and inspect at least 35,000 poles per year; the injunction is temporary as the court considers a state lawsuit set to begin trial in April 2027.

== See also ==
- Plant X, Lamb County, Texas
