= Franklin =

Franklin may refer to:

== People and characters ==
- Franklin (given name), including list of people and characters with the name
- Franklin (surname), including list of people and characters with the name
- Franklin (class), a member of a historical English social class

== Places ==
- Franklin (crater), a lunar impact crater
- Franklin County (disambiguation), in a number of countries
- Mount Franklin (disambiguation), including Franklin Mountain

=== Australia ===
- Franklin, Tasmania, a township
- Division of Franklin, federal electoral division in Tasmania
- Division of Franklin (state), state electoral division in Tasmania
- Franklin, Australian Capital Territory, a suburb in the Canberra district of Gungahlin
- Franklin River, river of Tasmania
- Franklin Sound, waterway of Tasmania

=== Canada ===
- District of Franklin, a former district of the Northwest Territories
- Franklin, Quebec, a municipality in the Montérégie region
- Rural Municipality of Franklin, Manitoba
- Franklin, Manitoba, an unincorporated community in the Rural Municipality of Rosedale, Manitoba
- Franklin Glacier Complex, a volcano in southwestern British Columbia
- Franklin Range, a mountain range on Vancouver Island, British Columbia
- Franklin River (Vancouver Island), British Columbia
- Franklin Strait, Nunavut

=== Cayman Islands ===
- Franklin's Forest, Grand Cayman

=== New Zealand ===
- Franklin County, New Zealand, former county
- Franklin District, a former territorial authority area
- Franklin Local Board, local board part of Auckland Council
- Franklin (New Zealand electorate), a former parliamentary electorate
- Franklin Ward, electoral ward of Auckland Council

=== Poland ===
- Franklin, Łódź Voivodeship (central Poland), a village

=== United States ===
- State of Franklin (1784–1789), an unrecognized, autonomous territory and former republic that later became part of Tennessee
- Franklin, Alabama, a town in Macon County
- Franklin, Monroe County, Alabama
- Franklin, Arkansas
- Franklin, California (disambiguation), multiple places in California with the same name.
- Franklin, Connecticut
- Franklin, Georgia
- Franklin, Idaho
- Franklin, Illinois
- Franklin, Indiana, the county seat of Johnson County
- Franklin, Wayne County, Indiana
- Franklin, Iowa
- Franklin, Kansas, a census-designated place in Crawford County
- Franklin, Douglas County, Kansas
- Franklin, Kentucky
- Franklin, Louisiana
- Franklin, Maine
- Franklin, Massachusetts
- Franklin, Michigan
- Franklin, Minnesota
- Franklin, Missouri, a city in Howard County
- Pacific, Missouri, formerly known as Franklin
- Franklin, Nebraska
- Franklin, New Hampshire
- Franklin, New Jersey
- Franklin, New York (disambiguation)
- Franklin, North Carolina
- Franklin, Ohio
- Franklin, Pennsylvania (disambiguation)
- Franklin, Tennessee
- Franklin, Texas
- Franklin, Vermont
- Franklin, Virginia
- Franklin, West Virginia
- Franklin, Wisconsin (disambiguation)
- Franklin Mountains (Alaska), a mountain range
- Mount Franklin (New Hampshire), in the White Mountains
- Franklin Falls (disambiguation)
- Franklin Township (disambiguation)

== Arts and entertainment ==
- Franklin (miniseries), 2024 biographical drama about Benjamin Franklin
- Franklin (Peanuts), a character in the comic strip Peanuts
- Franklin (TV series), children's television series about a turtle named Franklin
- The title character of Franklin the Turtle (books), the book series on which the TV series was based
- Roosevelt Franklin, a former character on Sesame Street
- The title character of Franklin & Bash, a TV series that began in 2011
- Franklin, character in the comic book Monica and Friends
- Franklin, the mascot of the Philadelphia 76ers

== Businesses ==
- Franklin Electronic Publishers, an electronic reference company and former computer manufacturer
- Franklin Engine Company, a manufacturer of aircraft engines
- The Franklin Mint, a producer of collectibles

== Schools ==
- Franklin University Switzerland, an American university in Lugano, Switzerland
- Franklin College (disambiguation)
- Franklin High School (disambiguation)

== Ships ==
- USS Franklin
- HMAS Franklin, an Australian Navy steel screw steamer
- Northern Franklin, a marine research vessel
- SS Foundation Franklin, a seagoing rescue tug
- Franklin (sidewheeler), an 1850s American steamboat
- French ship Franklin (1797), captured by the British and sailed as HMS Canopus

== Transportation ==
- Franklin (automobile), an American automobile
- Franklin station (disambiguation)

== Other uses ==
- Battle of Franklin (disambiguation)
- Franklin (tree), a giant sequoia in Sequoia National Park, California, US
- Franklin (unit), a unit of electrical charge
- Franklin Institute, a museum in Philadelphia

== See also ==
- The Franklin's Tale, one of the Canterbury Tales
- Franklyn (name)
- Franquelin (disambiguation)
- Sir John Franklin (disambiguation)
