= List of places named for Benjamin Franklin =

There are many places and institutions named for Benjamin Franklin, one of the Founding Fathers of the United States. These include counties, municipalities (that is, towns and cities), geologic features, colleges and universities, high schools, middle schools, elementary schools, businesses, transportation ways, and a proposed U.S. state.

== Territories ==
- State of Franklin, a defunct state located in what is now northeastern Tennessee near present-day Elizabethton, Tennessee.

== Counties ==
24 Counties and Parishes in the United States are named for Benjamin Franklin.

- Franklin County, Alabama
- Franklin County, Arkansas
- Franklin County, Florida
- Franklin County, Georgia
- Franklin County, Illinois
- Franklin County, Indiana
- Franklin County, Iowa
- Franklin County, Kansas
- Franklin County, Kentucky
- Franklin Parish, Louisiana
- Franklin County, Maine
- Franklin County, Massachusetts
- Franklin County, Mississippi
- Franklin County, Missouri
- Franklin County, Nebraska
- Franklin County, New York
- Franklin County, North Carolina
- Franklin County, Ohio
- Franklin County, Pennsylvania
- Franklin County, Tennessee
- Franklin County, Vermont
- Franklin County, Virginia
- Franklin County, Washington

== Municipalities ==
- Franklin, Alabama
- Franklin, Arkansas
- Franklin, California
  - Franklin, Los Angeles County, California
  - Franklin, Napa County, California
  - Franklin, Sacramento County, California
  - Franklin, San Joaquin County, California
- Franklin, Connecticut
- Franklin Park, Florida
- Franklin, Georgia
- Franklin, Illinois
- Franklin, Indiana
- Franklin, Iowa
- Franklin, Kentucky
- Franklin, Louisiana
- Franklinton, Louisiana
- Franklin, Maine
- Franklin, Massachusetts, the first town in the US named for Benjamin Franklin
- Franklin, Michigan
- Franklin, Minnesota
- Franklin, Missouri
- Franklin, Nebraska
- Franklin, New Hampshire
- Franklin, New Jersey
- Franklin Lakes, New Jersey
- Franklin Park, New Jersey
- Franklin, New York
  - Franklin, Delaware County, New York, a town
    - Franklin (village), New York, within the town in Delaware County
  - Franklin, Franklin County, New York, a town
- Franklinton, North Carolina
- Franklin, Ohio
- Franklin, Pennsylvania
  - Franklin, Cambria County, Pennsylvania, a borough
  - Franklin, Pennsylvania, city in Venango County
- Franklin Park, Pennsylvania
- Franklin, Tennessee
- Franklin, Texas
- Franklin, Vermont
- Franklin, Virginia
- Franklin, West Virginia
- Franklin, Jackson County, Wisconsin
- Franklin, Kewaunee County, Wisconsin
- Franklin, Manitowoc County, Wisconsin
- Franklin, Milwaukee County, Wisconsin
- Franklin, Sauk County, Wisconsin
- Franklin, Vernon County, Wisconsin
- Franklinton, neighborhood in Columbus, Ohio

== Geologic features ==
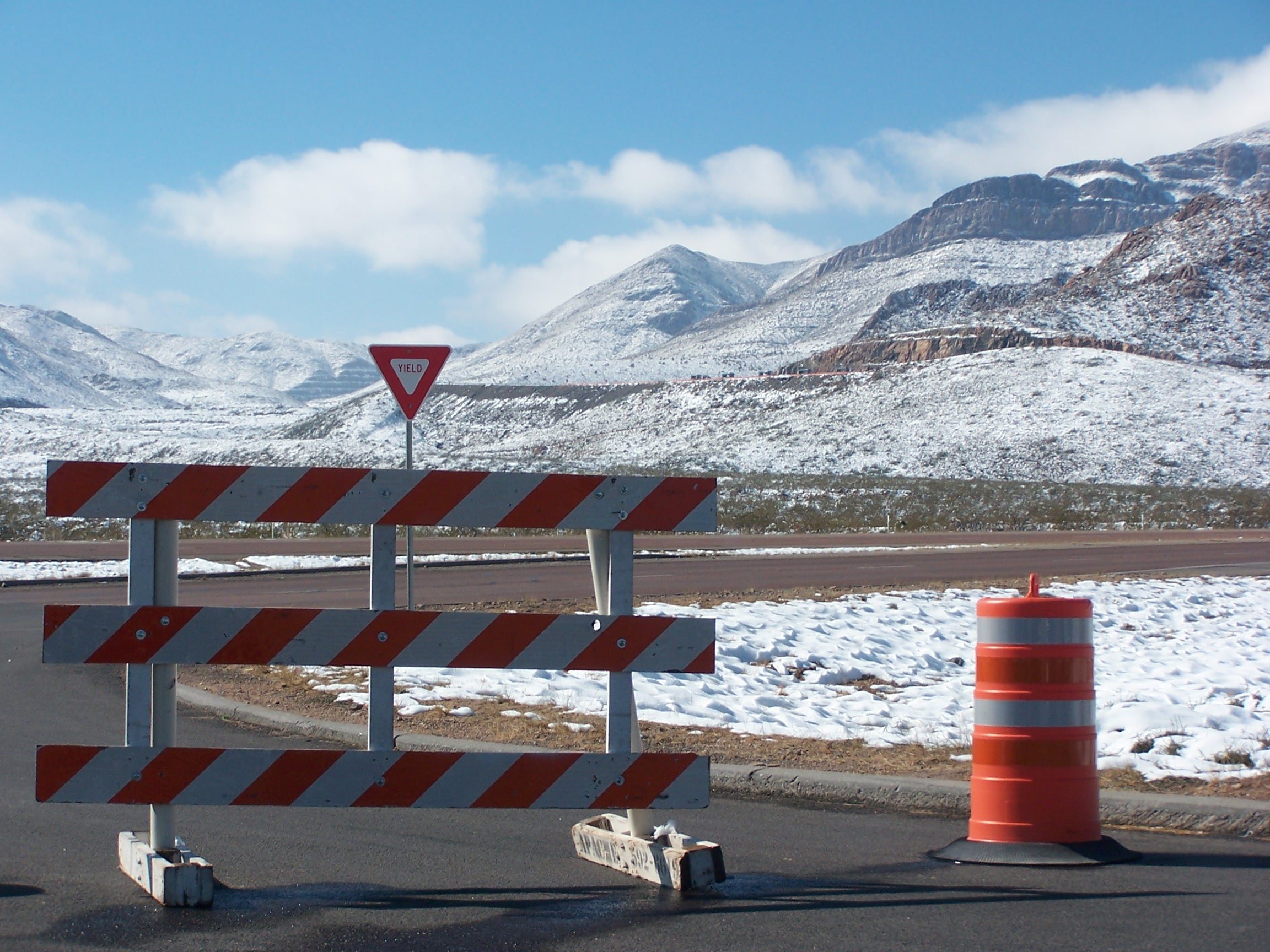
Snow on Franklin Mountains in El Paso

- Mount Franklin, in New Hampshire's White Mountains
- Franklin Mountains, El Paso, Texas
- Franklin Mountains, northern Alaska
- Benjamin Franklin Lake, Mt Juliet, Tennessee

== Schools ==
=== Colleges and universities ===
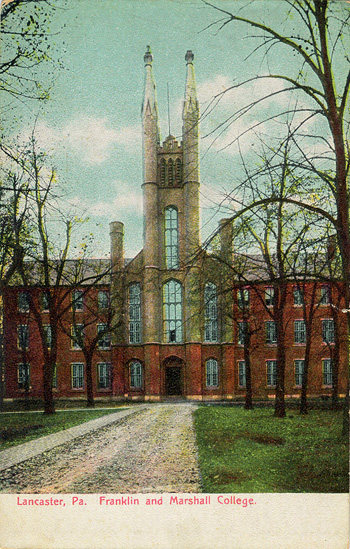
Old Main, Franklin & Marshall College, c. 1910

- Franklin College, Lancaster, Pennsylvania, established 1787; now Franklin and Marshall College
- Franklin College, in Franklin, Indiana
- Franklin College, a residential college at Yale University
- Franklin College of Arts and Sciences at the University of Georgia (in its earliest days, before the university contained multiple colleges, the entire institution was referred to as Franklin)
- Franklin University, in Columbus, Ohio
- Campus Benjamin Franklin, a part of the Charité, Berlin, Germany
- Benjamin Franklin Institute of Technology in Boston, Massachusetts
- Franklin University Switzerland in Lugano, Switzerland

=== Elementary, middle, and high schools ===
==== High schools ====
- Franklin High School (Elk Grove, California)
- Franklin High School (Los Angeles, California)
- Franklin High School (Stockton, California)
- Franklin County High School, (Rocky Mount, VA)
- Franklin Central High School, (Indianapolis, Indiana)
- Franklin Senior High School, (Franklin, Louisiana)
- Benjamin Franklin High School (New Orleans, Louisiana)
- Franklin High School (Reisterstown, Maryland)
- Franklin High School (Massachusetts)
- Franklin High School (Livonia, Michigan)
- Franklin High School (New Hampshire)
- Franklin High School (New Jersey)
- Benjamin Franklin High School (Rochester, New York)
- Felicity-Franklin High School (Felicity, Ohio)
- Franklin High School (Franklin, Ohio)
- Franklin High School (Portland, Oregon)
- Benjamin Franklin High School (Philadelphia, Pennsylvania)
- Franklin Learning Center, (Philadelphia, Pennsylvania)
- Franklin Towne Charter High School, (Philadelphia, Pennsylvania)
- Franklin High School (Tennessee)
- Franklin High School (El Paso, Texas)
- Franklin High School (Virginia)
- Franklin High School (Seattle, Washington)
- Franklin High School (Franklin, Wisconsin)
- Benjamin Franklin High School (Queen Creek, Arizona)
- Franklin County High School (Brookville, Indiana)

==== Middle schools ====
- Benjamin Franklin Middle School, Vallejo, California
- Benjamin Franklin Middle School, Valparaiso, Indiana
- Benjamin Franklin Middle School, Ridgewood, New Jersey
- Benjamin Franklin Middle School, Teaneck, New Jersey
- Benjamin Franklin Middle School, Tonawanda, New York
- Benjamin Franklin Middle School, Fargo, North Dakota
- Benjamin Franklin Middle School, Rocky Mount, Virginia – see also Franklin County High School (Rocky Mount, Virginia) (above)
- Franklin Middle School, Reisterstown, Maryland – see also Franklin High School (Reisterstown, Maryland) (above)
- Franklin Middle School, (Cedar Rapids, Iowa)
- Franklin Middle School, Janesville, Wisconsin
- Franklin Middle School, Fairfax County, Virginia

==== Elementary schools ====
- Franklin Elementary School, Franklin, Connecticut
- Franklin Elementary School, Janesville, Wisconsin
- Benjamin Franklin Elementary School, Glendale, California
- Benjamin Franklin Elementary School, Miami, Florida
- Benjamin Franklin Elementary School Terre Haute, Indiana
- Franklin Elementary School, Reisterstown, Maryland – see also Franklin High School (Reisterstown, Maryland) (above)
- Franklin Elementary, Rochester, Minnesota
- Franklin Elementary School, Roxbury, New Jersey
- Benjamin Franklin Elementary School, Keene, New Hampshire
- Benjamin Franklin Elementary School, Menomonee Falls, Wisconsin
- Benjamin Franklin Elementary School, Lawrenceville, New Jersey
- Franklin Elementary School, Summit, New Jersey
- Benjamin Franklin Elementary School, Binghamton, New York

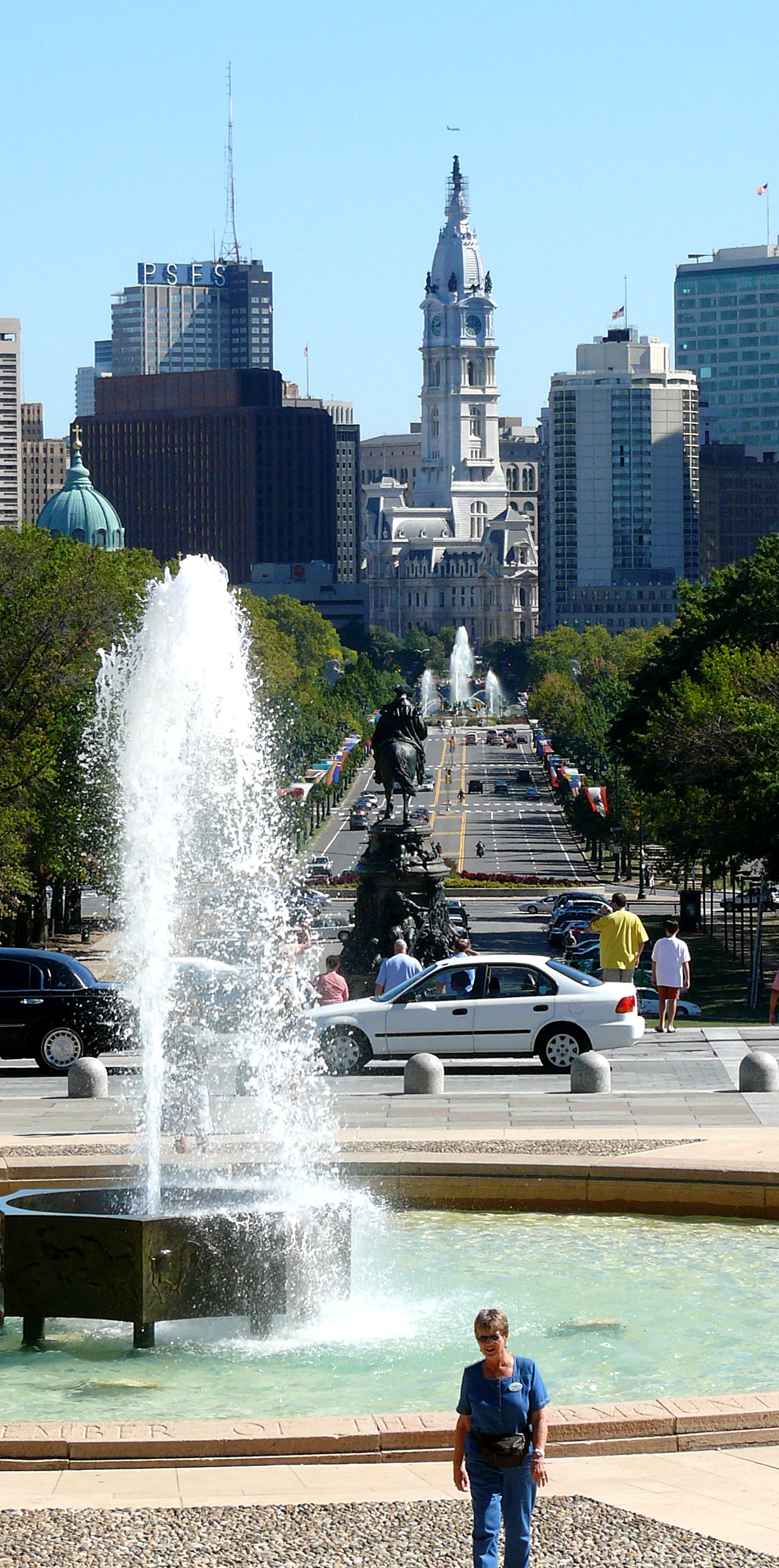
Benjamin Franklin Parkway, from the top of the steps of the Philadelphia Museum of Art.

- Benjamin Franklin Elementary School, Yorktown Heights, New York
- Benjamin Franklin Elementary School, Grand Forks, North Dakota
- Benjamin Franklin Elementary School, Philadelphia, Pennsylvania
- Benjamin Franklin International School Barcelona
- Ben Franklin Kindergarten Center, Dupont, Pennsylvania
- Benjamin Franklin Elementary School, Kirkland, Washington
- Franklin Elementary School, Wausau, Wisconsin

== Businesses ==
- Ben Franklin five and dime stores
- Franklin Mills Mall (now Philadelphia Mills Mall)
- Franklin Templeton Investments
- Benjamin Franklin Plumbing
- FranklinCovey's corporate campus in Salt Lake City

== Transportation ==
- Benjamin Franklin Bridge, Philadelphia, Pennsylvania
- Franklin Street, Philadelphia, Pennsylvania
- Benjamin Franklin Parkway, Philadelphia, Pennsylvania
- U.S. Route 422 in Pennsylvania is named the Benjamin Franklin Highway
- Franklin Street, Baltimore, Maryland
- Franklin Street, Boston, Massachusetts
- Franklin Street, Chapel Hill, North Carolina
- Franklin Street, Portland, Maine
- Franklin Street, Richmond, Virginia

== Other ==
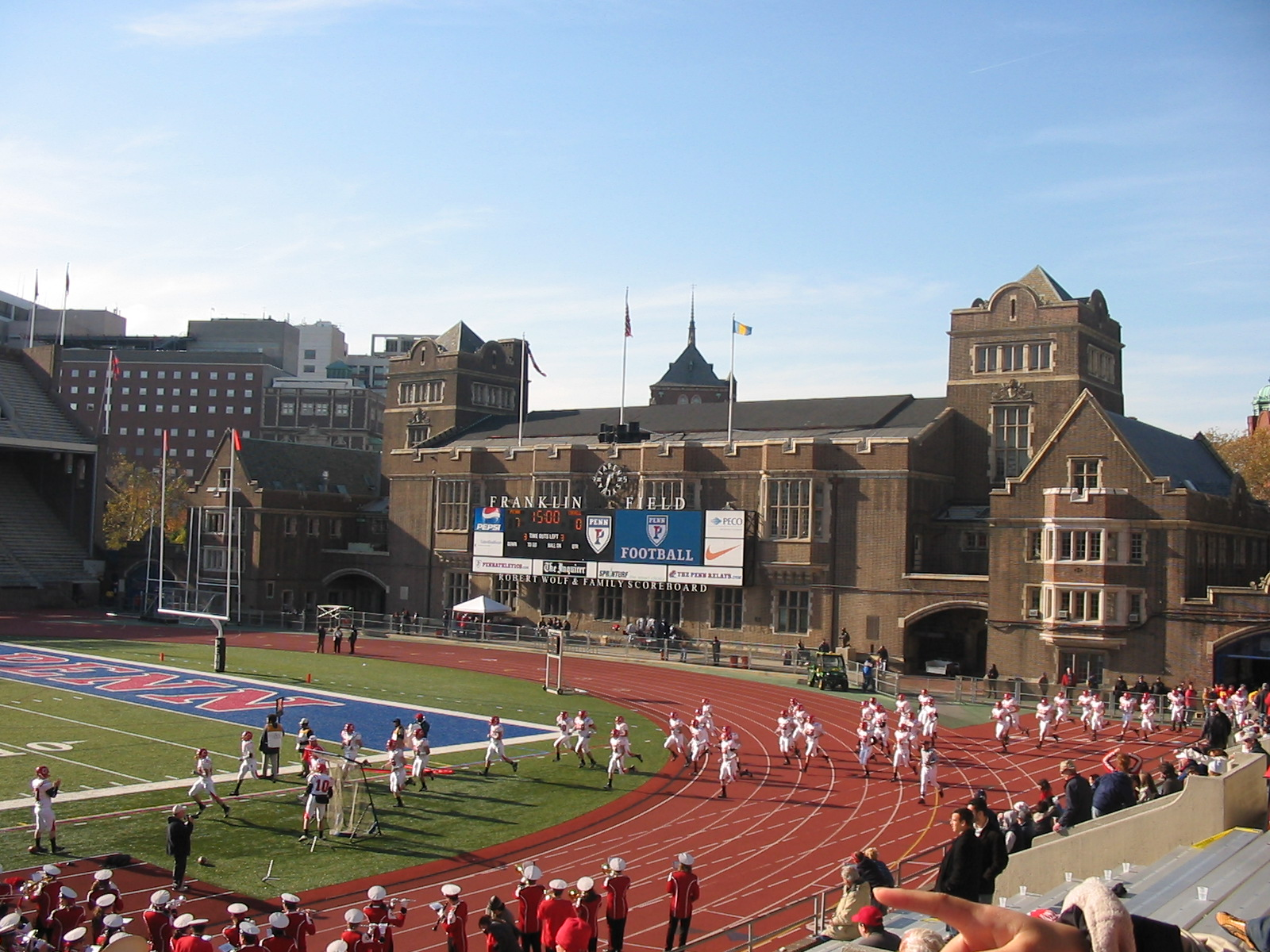
Franklin Field, the football stadium at the University of Pennsylvania

- Benjamin Franklin Centre, the student centre at the Chinese University of Hong Kong
- The Franklin crater on the Moon
- Franklin Field, the football stadium at the University of Pennsylvania, Philadelphia
- The Franklin Inn Club, one of the four historic gentlemen's clubs in Philadelphia's Center City and was the first to open membership to women in Philadelphia.
- Franklin Institute, a major science museum in Philadelphia, which includes a Planetarium
- Franklin Park, Boston
  - Franklin Park Zoo
- Franklin Park Conservatory
- First Battle of Franklin, an American Civil War battle
- Second Battle of Franklin, an American Civil War battle
- PS Benjamin Franklin
- Several ships named USS Franklin
- SS Benjamin Franklin, a Liberty Ship

== See also ==
- Franklin (disambiguation)
