= Mount Franklin =

Mount Franklin or Franklin Mountains, may refer to:

== Places ==
=== Antarctica ===
- Mount Franklin (Antarctica)

=== Australia ===
- Mount Franklin (Australian Capital Territory), on the border between the Australian Capital Territory and New South Wales
- Mount Franklin (Victoria)

=== New Zealand ===
- Mount Franklin (Canterbury)
- Mount Franklin (Southland)
- Mount Franklin (Tasman)
- Mount Franklin (West Coast)

=== United States ===
- Franklin Mountains (Alaska), USA; a mountain range
- Mount Franklin (New Hampshire)
- Franklin Mountain, New York, USA; a mountain
- North Mount Franklin (Texas)
- Franklin Mountains State Park, Texas, USA

== Other uses ==
- Mount Franklin Water, a brand of mineral water owned by Coca-Cola Amatil

== See also ==
- Mount Frankland National Park, Western Australia, Australia
- Franklin (disambiguation)
