= Sir John Franklin School =

Sir John Franklin is the name of several schools:

- Sir John Franklin Junior High School (Calgary), Alberta, Canada
- Sir John Franklin Elementary School, Vancouver, British Columbia, Canada
- Sir John Franklin High School, Yellowknife, Northwest Territories, Canada
- Sir John Franklin Secondary Modern School, Lincolnshire, England, UK

== See also ==
- Sir John Franklin (disambiguation)
- John Franklin (disambiguation)
- Franklin (disambiguation)
