= John Franklin (disambiguation) =

Sir John Franklin (1786–1847) was a British Royal Navy officer and explorer of the Arctic.

John Franklin may also refer to:

== People ==
- John Franklin (1732–1801), American colonial leaders and agent for patriot prisoners, of Deborah Morris and John Franklin
- John Franklin (actor) (born 1959), American actor
- John Franklin (comedian), American comedian and media personality
- John Franklin (cyclist), British cyclist
- John Franklin (died 1831), Wiltshire monumental mason
- John Franklin (footballer) (1924–2005), English football forward
- John Franklin III (born 1994), American football wide receiver
- Sir John Franklin (fl. 1785), Lord Mayor of Cork, Ireland; see List of mayors of Cork
- John Franklin Bobbitt (1876–1956), American educationist
- John Franklin Enders (1897–1985), American biomedical scientist
- John Franklin-Myers (born 1996), American football defensive end
- John Hope Franklin (1915–2009), American historian
- John M. Franklin (1896–1975), American general
- John Rankin Franklin (1820–1878), American politician

== Other uses ==
- Rosa 'John Franklin', a cultivar of the shrub rose

== See also ==
- Sir John Franklin (disambiguation)
- Johnathan Franklin (born 1989), American football running back
- The John Franklin Letters
- Franklin (disambiguation)
- John (disambiguation)
