= Francklyn =

Francklyn is a surname. Notable people with the surname include:

- Charles G. Francklyn (1844–1929), British-American industrialist in New York society
- John Francklyn (c. 1564–1645), English politician

== See also ==
- Francklin
- Franklyn (name)
