= CCGS Sir John Franklin =

CCGS Sir John Franklin is the name of two Canadian Coast Guard (CCG) ships, honouring Sir John Franklin, British Arctic explorer and naval officer.

- CCGS Sir John Franklin (1979) (id: 383347, callsign: CGDT) launched 1979, Canadian Coast Guard medium icebreaker, renamed CCGS Amundsen in 2002 and becoming a research ship.
- CCGS Sir John Franklin (2017) (id: 842730, callsign: VFAM) launched 2017, Canadian Coast Guard research ship

== See also ==
- List of equipment of the Canadian Coast Guard
- Sir John Franklin-class research ship, a research vessel class of the Canadian Coast Guard
- Sir John Franklin (disambiguation)
- John Franklin (disambiguation)
- Franklin (disambiguation)
