= Robert Chambers =

Robert or Bob Chambers may refer to:

== Arts and entertainment ==
- Robert W. Chambers (1865–1933), American artist and writer, author of The King in Yellow
- Bob Chambers (cartoonist) (1905–1996), Canadian cartoonist and illustrator
- Robert Chambers (sculptor) (born 1958), American sculptor

== Law and politics ==
- Robert Chambers (English judge) (1737–1803), English judge, professor of jurisprudence, Chief Justice of Bengal, collector of Sanskrit manuscripts
- Robert Chambers (Canadian politician) (1813–1875), Canadian merchant and politician
- Robert Chambers (Quebec politician) (1834–1886), Canadian politician, Quebec City mayor
- Robert Charles Chambers (born 1952), United States federal judge
- Robert Chambers (New Zealand judge) (1953–2013), New Zealand judge and Supreme Court justice
- Robert Emmett Chambers, American lawyer and politician

== Sports ==
- Robert Chambers (oarsman) (1831–1868), English oarsman and world sculling champion
- Bob Chambers (footballer) (1899–1972), English footballer
- Bob Chambers (athlete) (1926–2010), American track and field athlete
- Robert Chambers (cricketer) (born 1943), English cricketer

== Others ==
- Robert Chambers (priest) (1571–1628), English Catholic priest, writer and translator
- Robert Chambers (publisher, born 1802) (1802–1871), Scottish publisher, writer, and scientist known for Vestiges of Creation and, with his brother William Chambers, Chambers's Encyclopaedia
- Robert Chambers Jr. (1832–1888), Scottish publisher and amateur golfer, son of the above
- R. C. Chambers (Robert Craig Chambers, 1832–1901), American businessman, minerals miner, banker, politician, sheriff, and silver mine supervisor
- Robert Chambers (biologist) (1881–1957), American biologist
- Robert G. Chambers (1924–2016), British physicist known for the first observation of the Aharonov-Bohm effect
- Robert Chambers (development scholar) (born 1932), British academic and development practitioner
- Robert Chambers (criminal) (born 1966), American criminal also known as the "Preppie Killer"
