= Berzelius (disambiguation) =

Berzelius is a secret society at Yale University

Berzelius may also refer to:

- Jöns Jacob Berzelius was a Swedish chemist.
- Berzelius (secret society), a secret society at Yale University
- Berzelius (crater), a lunar crater
- 13109 Berzelius, a Main-Belt minor planet
