= James Park (geologist) =

New Zealand geologist (1857–1946)

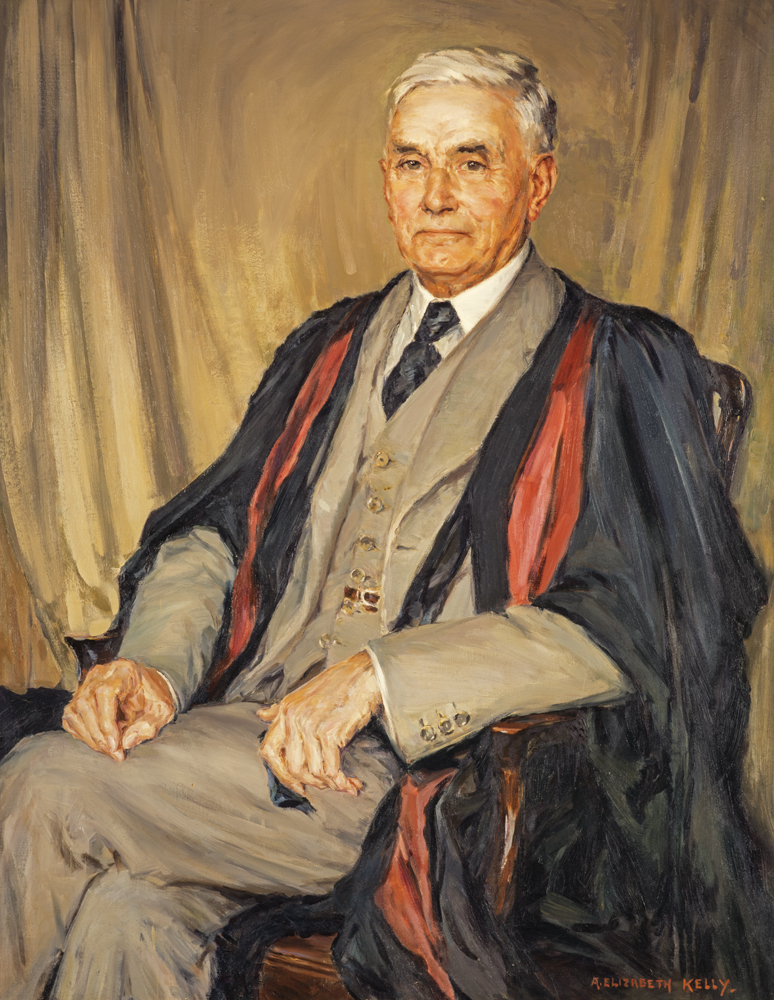
Park by Annie Elizabeth Kelly

James Park (2 July 1857 – 28 July 1946) was a Scottish-born geologist, director of school of mines, university professor, explorer, and writer, who was active in New Zealand. He was director of the Thames School of Mines for seven years, and went on to become the dean of the mining faculty at the University of Otago for 18 years.

== Early life ==
He was born in Kintore, Aberdeenshire, in Scotland on 2 July 1857 to James Park and Mary Snowie. His father and grandfather were engineers. He studied at the Royal School of Mines in London from 1872 until 1874. He emigrated to New Zealand with his sister in 1875. Initially he worked as a cadet on a sheep farm near Castlepoint, then in 1878 he started work with the Geological Survey of New Zealand as a field assistant where he made geological and botanical expeditions.

== Career ==
From 1882 to 1885, he worked for the Department of Lands and Survey as a computing draughtsman. While there, he organised expeditions around Nelson and he made the first ascent of Mt Franklin. In 1883, he starting laying the foundations that formed the Nelson Philosophical Society. In 1885 he returned to the Geological Survey, this time as a mining geologist. Park's duties included exploration and he made surveys in the districts of Taranaki, Nelson and West Coast districts.

In 1889 he became the director of the Thames School of Mines, which had been founded in 1885–86 to teach miners basic skills in geology, chemistry, metallurgy, physics and mathematics. In addition to writing the syllabus, Park supervised schools at Coromandel and Kuotunu and he started a building programme. Students from the Thames schools achieved excellent results. Meanwhile, he continued to explore the surrounding region and published papers, and he took on the role of manager of the Government experimental cyanide works which he installed at the school, and also used it to teach students the cyanide process to extract gold from quartz.

From 1896 to 1900, Park worked as consulting mining engineer for the Anglo-Continental goldmining syndicate. In 1901 he went back to teaching, as professor of mining and mining geology at the University of Otago School of Mines. After updating the curriculum and moving from the "tin shed" to a new building, he became the dean of the mining faculty in 1913.

He took up many roles service roles in his field. He was President of the Otago Institute, President of the Otago University Rugby Football Club, and President of the New Zealand Society of Mining Engineers.

In 1931 he retired at age 75, and the University's professorial board recorded that he "made the Diploma of the School a passport to the Mining Companies throughout the world".

Park wrote seven textbooks on mining topics, and total sales are estimated at more than 70,000 copies. His first book, The Cyanide Process of Gold Extraction (1894), was published in ten editions.

== Personal life ==
On 24 May 1880 he married Frances Olive Rogers and they had seven daughters and three sons. One son grew to become Air Commodore Sir Keith Park, who had a distinguished career in the Royal Air Force in two world wars. Frances left him (it is unclear when), and she died in 1917. He re-married on 11 July 1918, to Jane Clow Gray.

== Recognition ==
- 1886 Fellow of the Geological Society of London
- Professor emeritus
- Honorary member of the Institution of Mining and Metallurgy (London)
- Member of the board of governors of the New Zealand Institute
- Fellow of the New Zealand Institute
- Honorary Member of the Geological Society of Berlin
- Park's portrait hangs in the Scottish National Gallery
- The University of Otago offers the James Park Scholarship in Geology

== Published works ==
- The Cyanide Process of Gold Extraction. 1894. 3rd edition. 1897.
- Text-book of Mining Geology. 1906. 4th edition. 1918.
- Text-book of Theodolite Surveying and Levelling. 1908. 5th edition. 1922.
- The Geology of New Zealand. 1910.
- Text-book of Practical Assaying. 1914. 4th edition. 1922.
- Text-book of Geology. 1914.
- Text-book of Practical Hydraulics. 1916.
