= Battle of Franklin order of battle =

The order of battle for the Battle of Franklin:

- Battle of Franklin order of battle: Confederate
- Battle of Franklin order of battle: Union

== See also ==
- Battle of Franklin (disambiguation)
