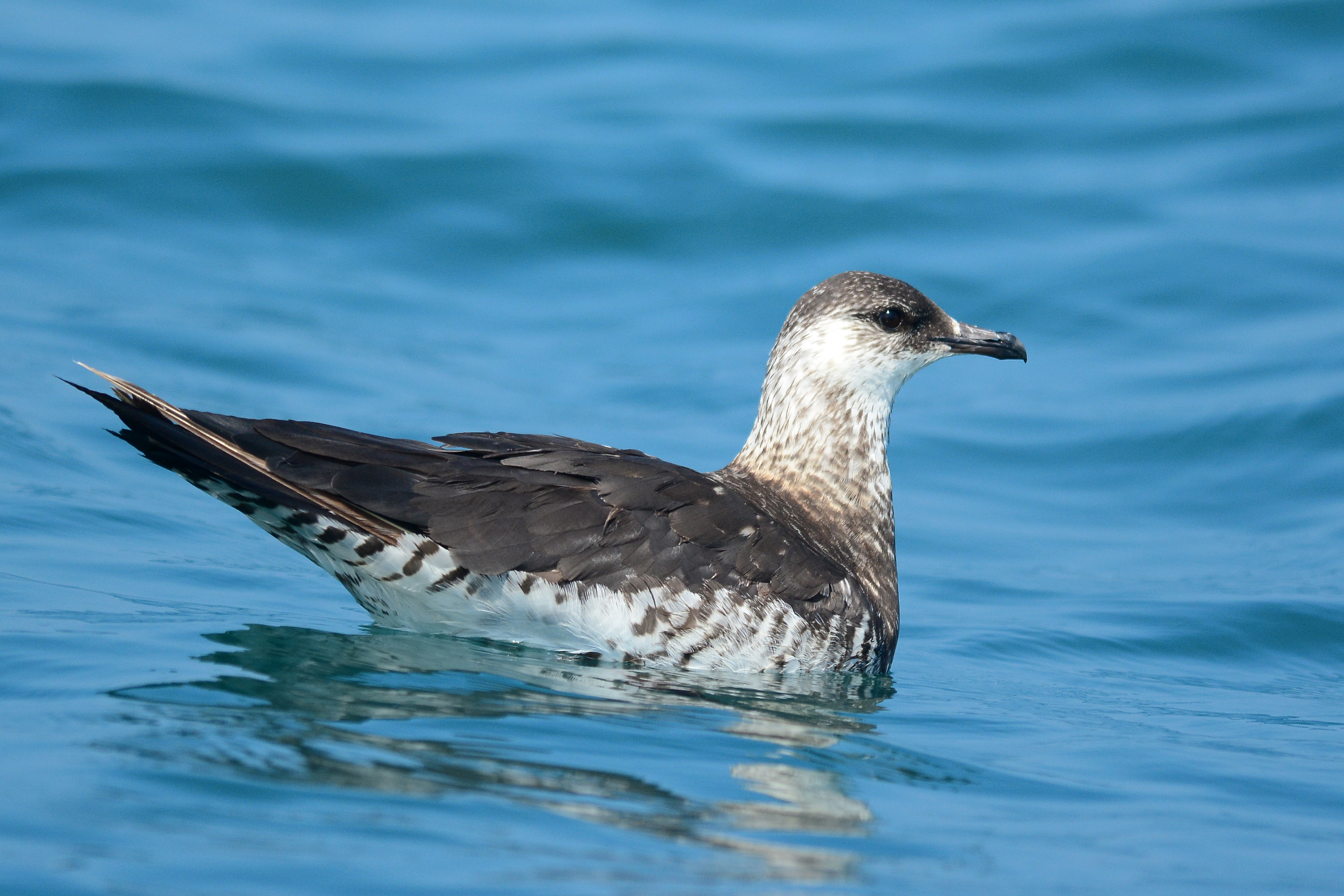

Conservation status
- Least Concern (IUCN 3.1)

- Endangered (IUCN 3.1)(Europe)

Scientific classification
- Kingdom: Animalia
- Phylum: Chordata
- Class: Aves
- Order: Charadriiformes
- Family: Stercorariidae
- Genus: Stercorarius
- Species: S. parasiticus

Binomial name
- Stercorarius parasiticus (Linnaeus, 1758)

Synonyms
- Larus parasiticus Linnaeus, 1758

= Parasitic jaeger =

Species of bird

The parasitic jaeger or arctic skua (Stercorarius parasiticus), also known as the parasitic skua or arctic jaeger, is a seabird in the skua family Stercorariidae. It is a migratory species breeding in Northern Fennoscandia, Scotland, Iceland, Greenland, Northern Canada, Alaska, and Siberia and wintering across the southern hemisphere. Kleptoparasitism is a major source of food for this species during migration and winter, and is where the name is derived from.

== Taxonomy ==
The parasitic jaeger was formally described in 1758 by the Swedish naturalist Carl Linnaeus in the tenth edition of his Systema Naturae under the binomial name Larus parasiticus. Linnaeus specified the type locality as "within the Tropic of Cancer of Europe, America and Asia" but this is now restricted to the Swedish coastline. The parasitic jaeger is now placed with the six other skuas in the genus Stercorarius that was introduced in 1760 by the French zoologist Mathurin Jacques Brisson. The species is considered to be monotypic: no subspecies are recognised. The genus name Stercorarius is Latin and means "of dung"; the food disgorged by other birds when pursued by skuas was once thought to be excrement. The specific parasiticus is from Latin and means "parasitic". The word "jaeger" is the German word Jäger, meaning "hunter". The English "skua" comes from the Faroese name skúgvur [ˈskɪkvʊər] for the great skua, with the island of Skúvoy known for its colony of that bird. The general Faroese term for skuas is kjógvi [ˈtʃɛkvə].

== Description ==
Identification is complicated by similarities to long-tailed jaeger and pomarine jaeger, and the existence of three colour morphs. Small for a skua, the parasitic jaeger measures 41–48 cm (16–19 in) in length, 107–125 cm (42–49 in) in wingspan and weighs 300–650 g (11 oz – 1 lb 7 oz). The tail streamer of the breeding adult accounts for about 7 cm (3 in) of their length. Light-morph adults have a brown back, mainly white underparts and dark primary wing feathers with a white "flash". The head and neck are yellowish-white with a black cap and there is a pointed central tail projection. Dark-morph adults are dark brown, and intermediate-phase birds are dark with somewhat paler underparts, head and neck. All morphs have the white wing flash.

Identification of juveniles is even more problematic, and it is difficult to separate parasitic jaegers from long-tailed jaegers. Parasitic jaegers are bulkier, shorter-winged, and less tern-like than long-tailed jaegers. They are usually warmer toned, with browner shades, rather than grey. However, they show the same wide range of plumage variation. The flight is more falcon-like. The parasitic jaeger is the most common of the three jaeger species seen from shore.

The typical call of these birds is a nasal mewing sound, repeated a few times in display. Their alarm call is a shorter sound.

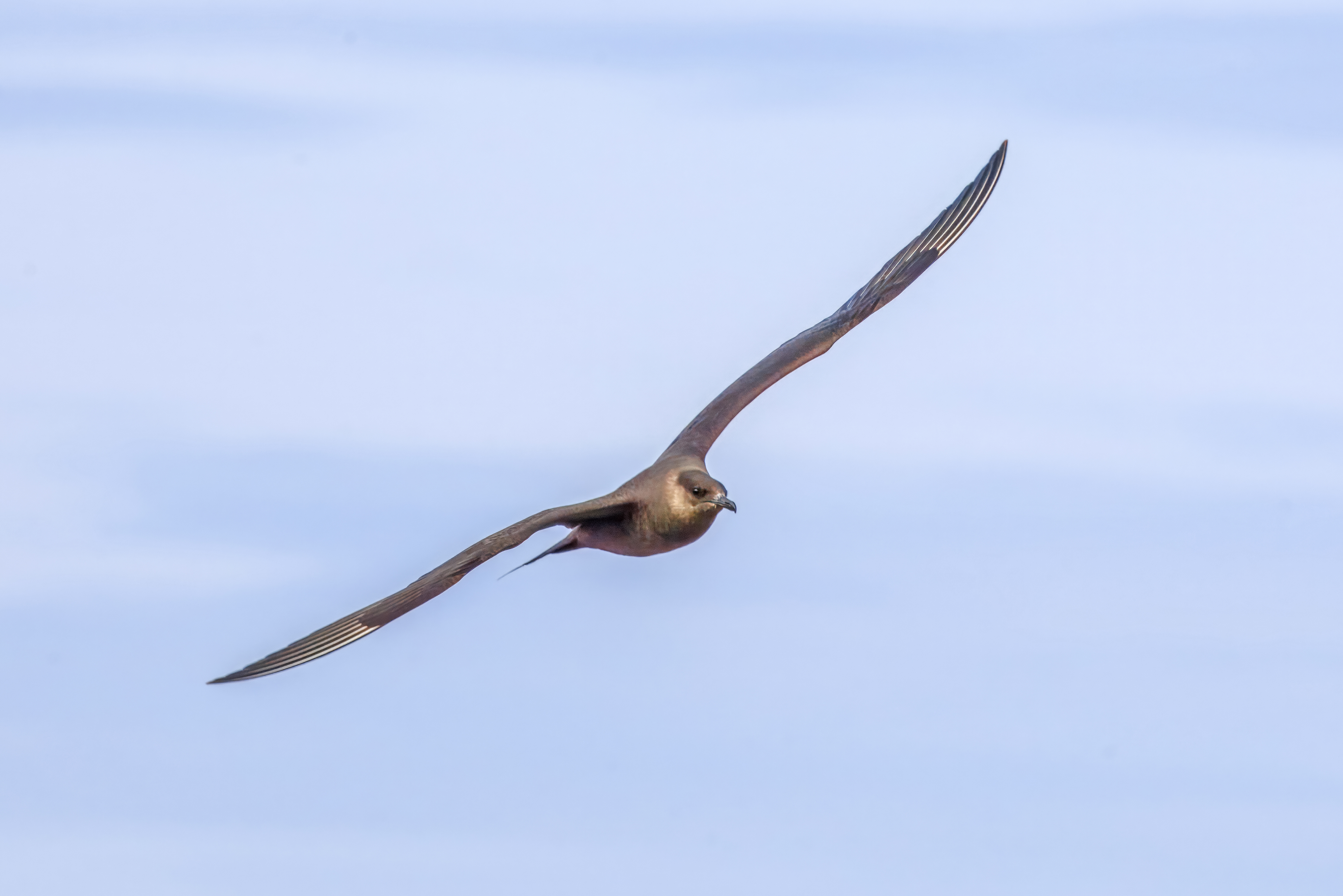
Dark morph in Iceland

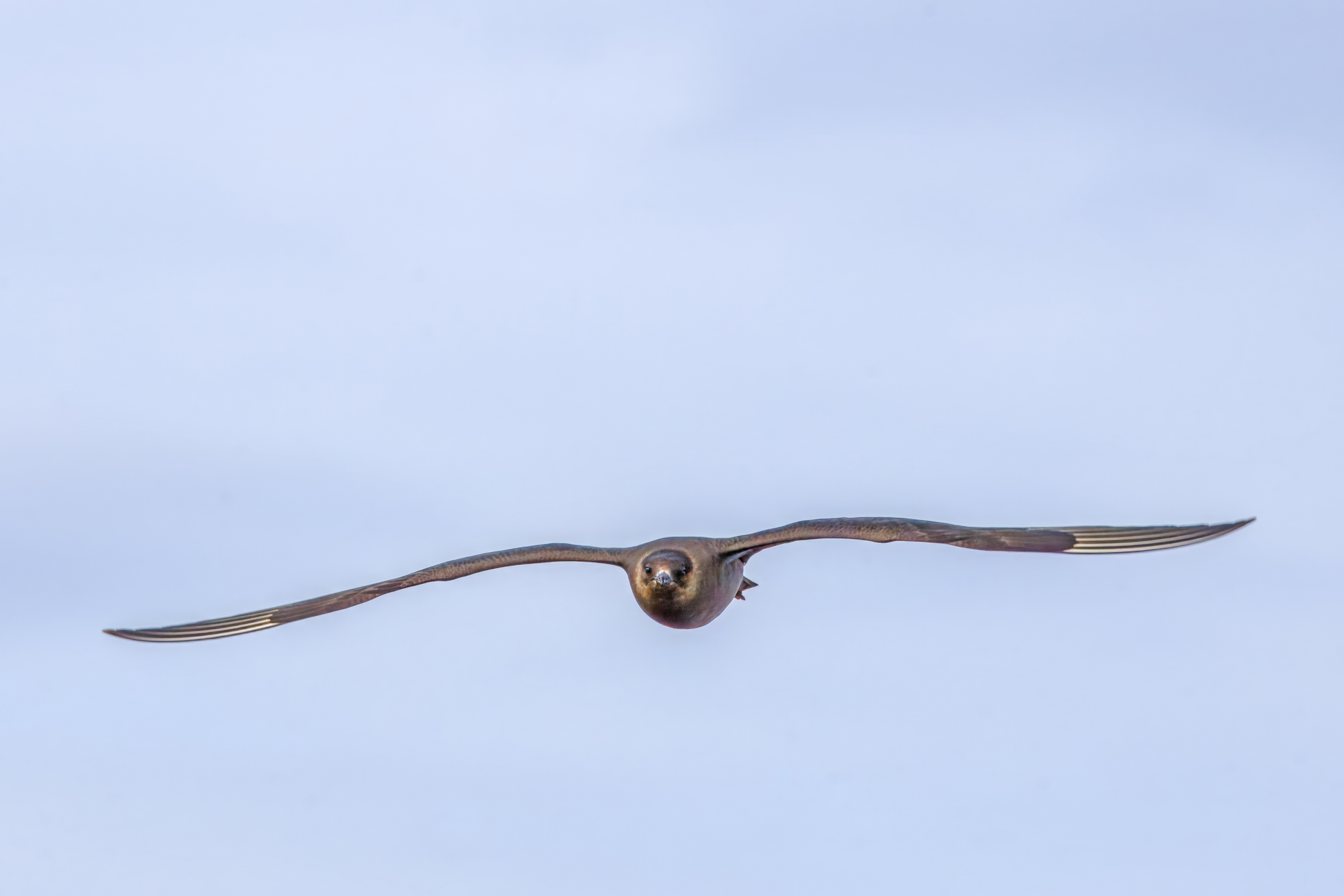
Dark morph in Iceland

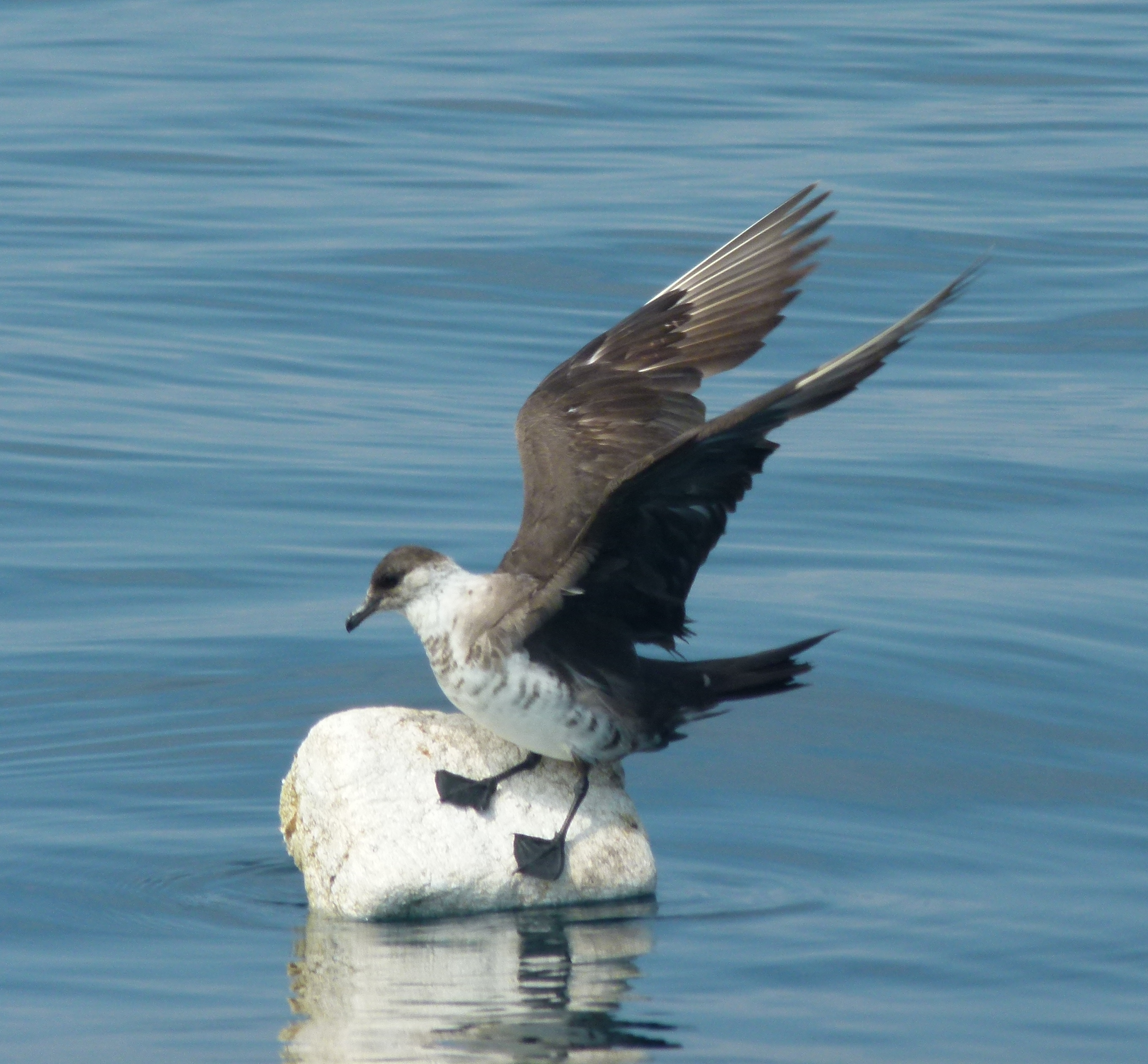
immature in India

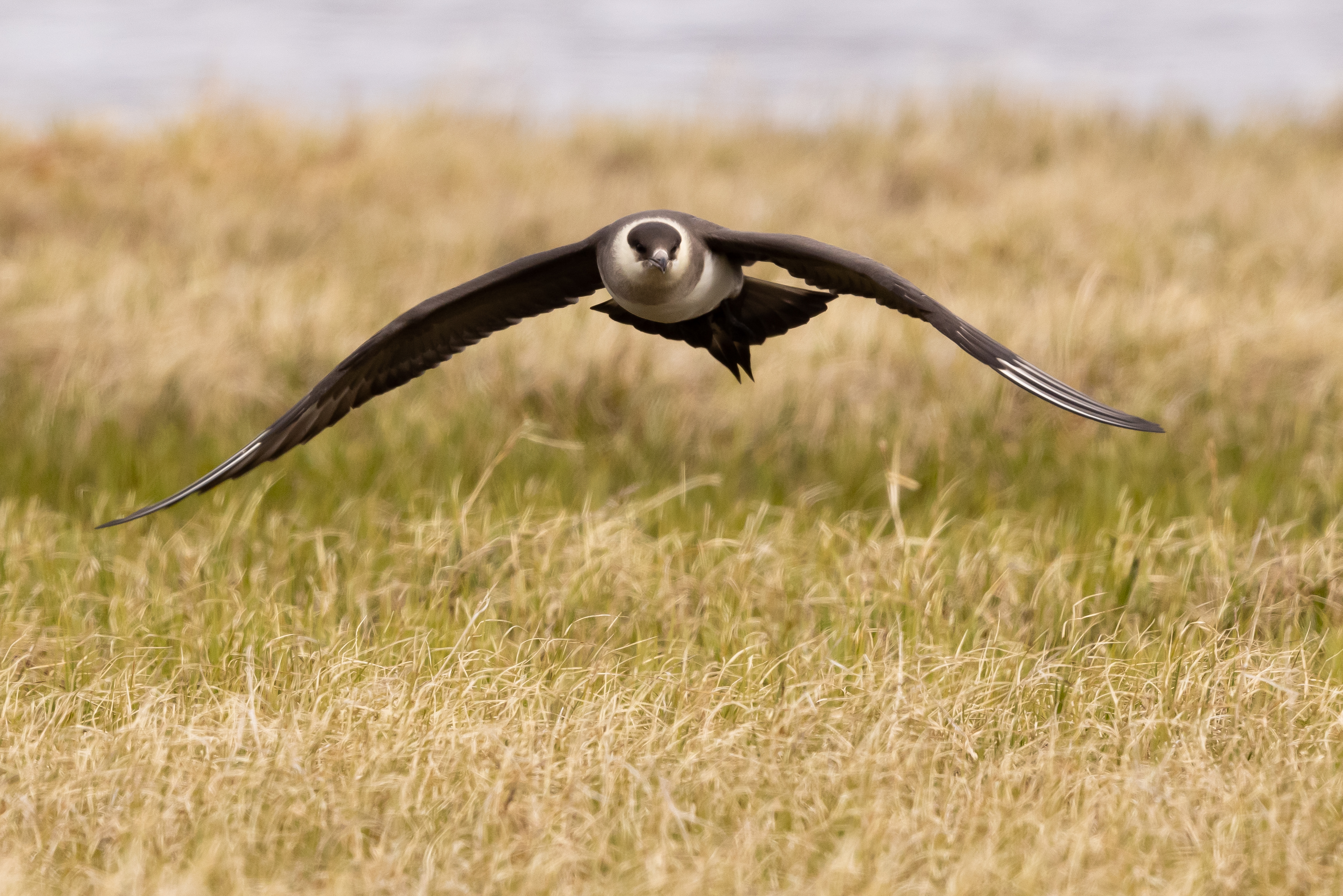
Light morph in Alaska

== Distribution and habitat ==
This species breeds in the north of Eurasia and North America, with significant populations as far south as northern Scotland, in Shetland and Orkney, the Outer Hebrides, Sutherland, Caithness, and some islands in Argyll. Birds in North America breed in Alaska, Yukon, the Northwest Territories, Nunavut, the Hudson Bay coast, and parts of Northern Quebec and Nunatsiavut.

The parasitic jaeger is a migrant, wintering at sea in the tropics and southern oceans. While much of the migration is over sea, overland spring migration occurs in the Canning River Valley, Alaska, and overland fall migration occurs from northern Russia to the Persian Gulf among Eurasian populations, and over the Great Lakes (particularly Lake Ontario) among American populations.

== Behavior ==
=== Breeding ===
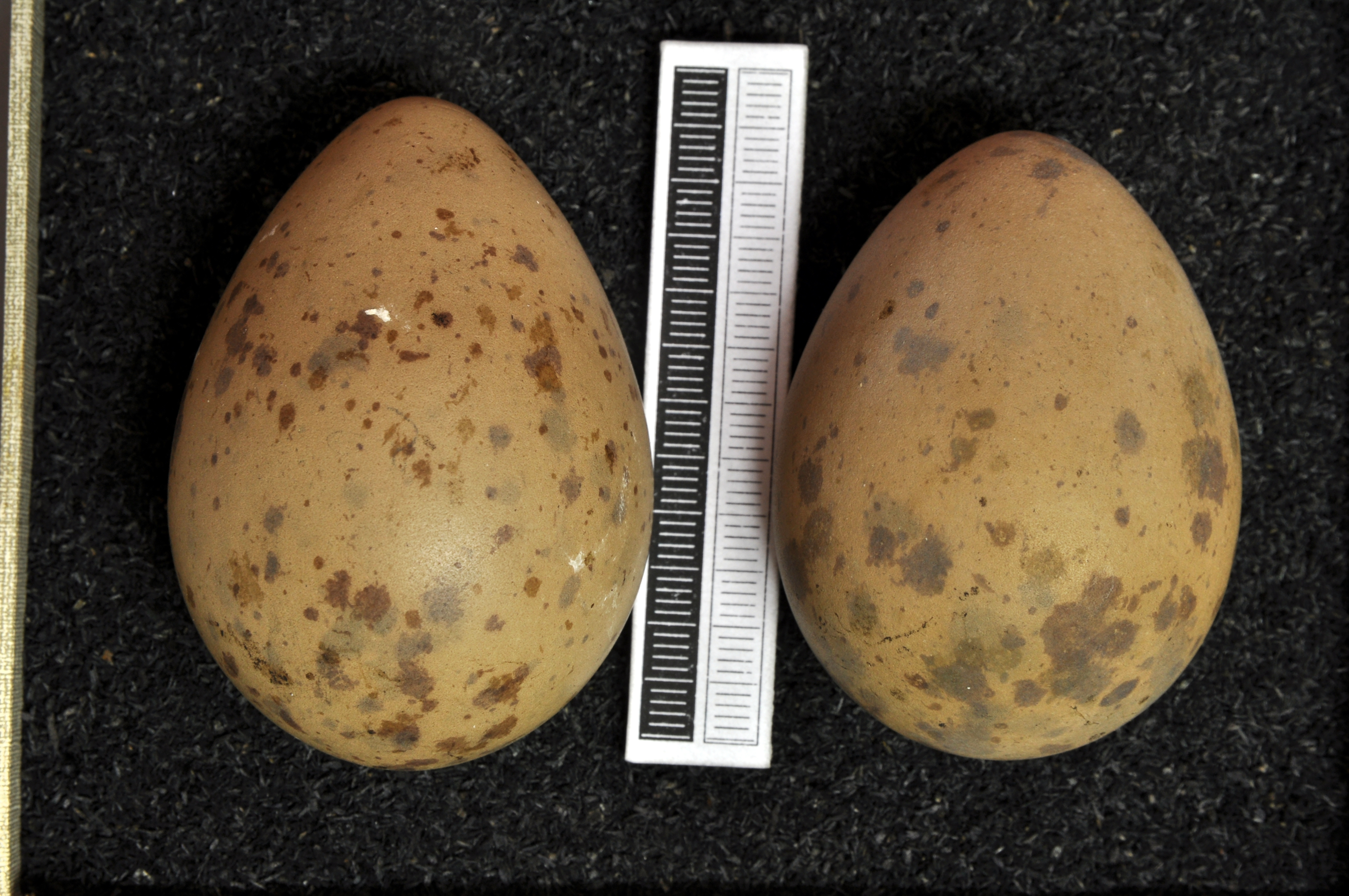
Eggs, Collection Museum Wiesbaden

Nesting occurs on dry tundra, higher fells, and islands. Clutches consist of up to four olive-brown eggs. Jaegers are usually silent except for mewing and wailing notes while on the breeding grounds. Like other skuas, it will fly at the head of a human or fox approaching its nest.

=== Feeding ===
This bird will feed on rodents, insects, eggs, chicks and small birds in the breeding season, but the majority of its diet (especially in winter and on migration) is made up of food that it acquires by robbing other birds (primarily gulls and terns) of their catches in an act called kleptoparasitism.

== Conservation status ==
In 2018, Stercorarius parasiticus was regionally uplisted to Endangered in Iceland, from Least Concern in 2000, after their numbers declined drastically in the early 2000s. It is globally listed as Least Concern.
