= Cepheus =

Cepheus (Ancient Greek: Κηφεύς Kepheús) may refer to:

== In Greek mythology ==
- Cepheus (father of Andromeda), and King of Aethiopia
- Cepheus (son of Aleus), a king of Tegea, Arcadia

== In astronomy ==
- Cepheus (constellation), one of the 88 modern constellations
- Cepheus (crater), a lunar impact crater

== In Computing ==
- Cepheus (poker bot)

== In modern fiction ==
- Cepheus Daidalos, a fictional character in the manga and anime, Saint Seiya
- Cepheus, the FM king in Mega Man Star Force
- In the Galaxy Railways, one of the squads is named the Cepheus Platoon.

== Other uses ==
- USS Cepheus (AKA-18), an Andromeda class attack cargo ship
