= New Zealand official war artists =

New Zealand official war artists are those whose artwork becomes a part of the record of New Zealanders' lives during times of war. In New Zealand, the title of appointed "war artist" changed to "army artist" after the two world wars.

Some were soldier-artists whose sketches and other artworks captured aspect of war through art. This might be a pictorial record or it might commemorate how "war shapes lives".

War artists have explored a visual and sensory dimension of war which is often absent in written histories or other accounts of warfare. Official war artists have been appointed by governments for information or propaganda purposes and to record events on the battlefield; but there are many other types of war artist.

The works produced by war artists illustrate and record many aspects of war, and the individual's experience of war, whether allied or enemy, service or civilian, military or political, social or cultural. The rôle of the artist and his work embraces the causes, course and consequences of conflict and it has an essentially educational purpose. New Zealand's National Art Gallery considered the collection to be of historic rather than artistic worth; and few were displayed.

New Zealand's National Collection of War Art encompasses the work of artists who were working on commission for the Government as "official war artists." while others created artworks for their own reasons. As documentary material, the collection of art is in the safe care of Archives New Zealand and located in the Wellington National Office, Thorndon, New Zealand. Archives New Zealand loans items from the collection on application from institutions, such as art galleries and museums, providing specific criteria are met. Most of the collection has been digitised, about 1500 works, and this is available to view online.

== First World War ==
Although depictions of New Zealanders at war date back to the nineteenth century (with soldier-artists' such as Gustavus von Tempsky and Charles Heaphy), the New Zealand tradition of official military artists started with the First World War. Official war artists were appointed in the First World War in order to create a record of New Zealand's involvement in the conflict. Lance Corporal Nugent Herman received the first official appointment as a New Zealand Army artist in April 1918.

== Second World War ==
During the Second World War, the official artist scheme of the First World War was adapted and only slightly changed. War artists were again appointed during the Second World War. These artists served in both Europe and in the Pacific theatre of operations. The title of "war artist" changed to "army artist" when Ion Brown was appointed in the postwar period.

== Selected artists ==
A select list of representative New Zealand artists includes:

=== First World War ===
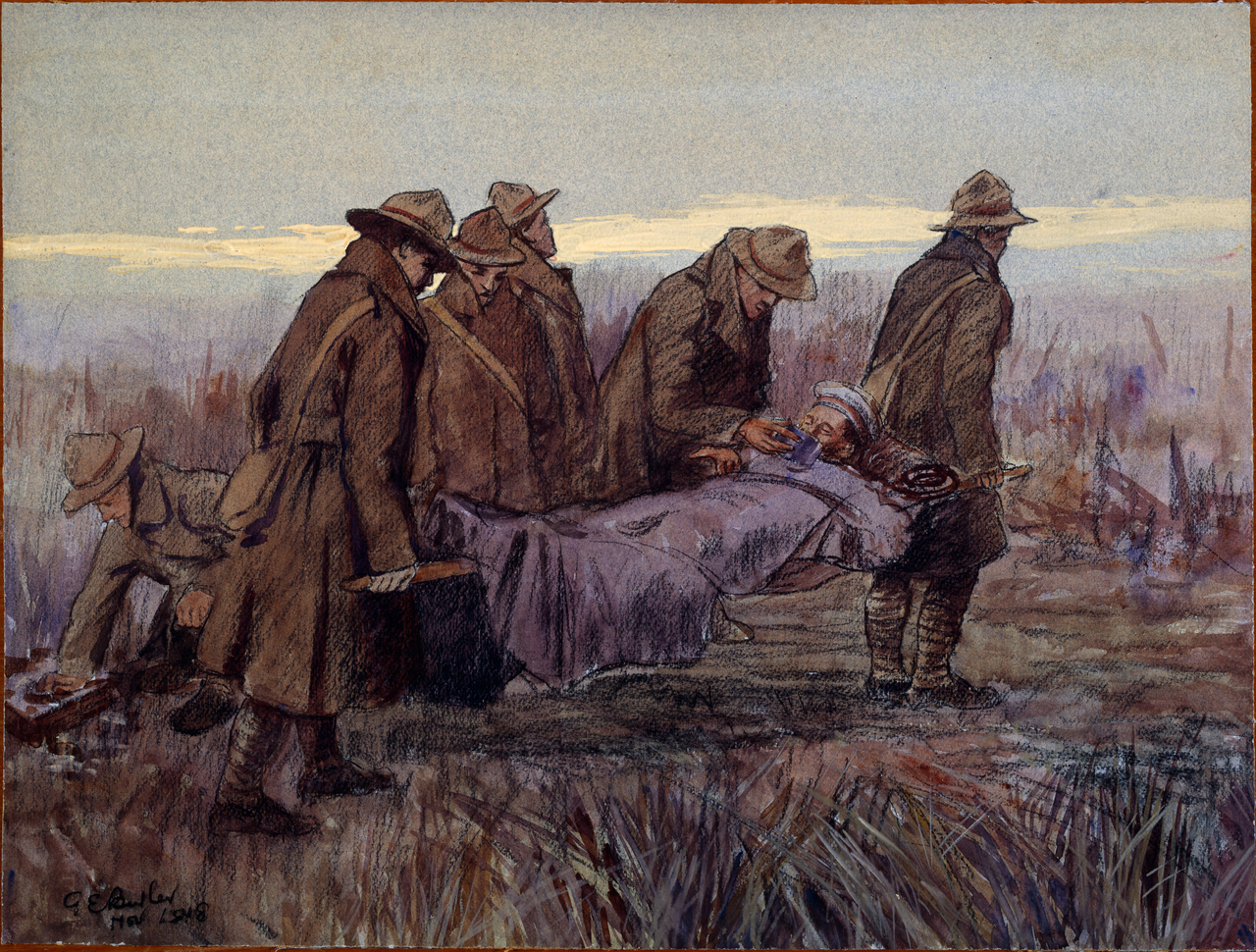
Stretcher Party, 1918 by George Edmund Butler

- George Edmund Butler
- Nugent Herman
- Annie Elizabeth Kelly
- Ernest Heber Thompson

=== Second World War ===
- Russell Clark, 1905–1966.
- James Boswell, 1906–1971.
- John McIndoe, 1898–1995.
- Peter McIntyre OBE, 1910–1995.

=== Recent Conflicts ===
- Graham Braddock
- Ion Brown, Bosnia and Croatia
- Matthew Gauldie, Solomon Islands and Afghanistan

== See also ==
- War artists
- Military art
- War photography
- American official war artists
- Australian official war artists
- British official war artists
