= Canning River (Alaska) =

River in Alaska

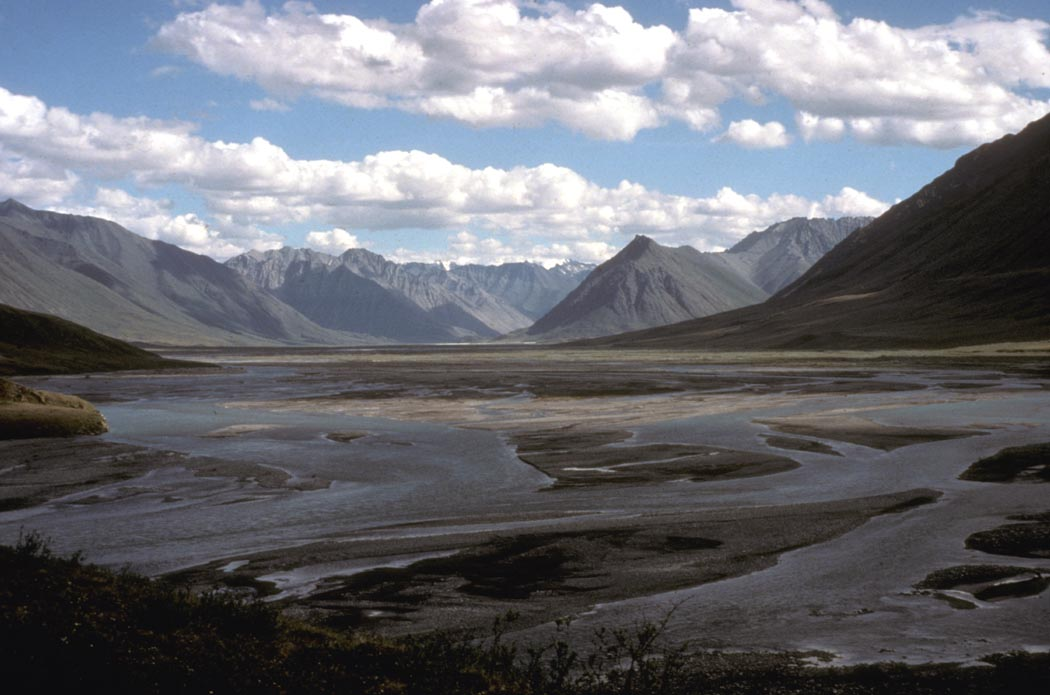
- Confluence with Marsh Fork

- Location of the mouth of the Canning River in Alaska

Location
- Country: United States
- State: Alaska
- Borough: North Slope

Physical characteristics
- Source: Franklin Mountains
  - location: Brooks Range
  - coordinates: 69°04′40″N 145°06′07″W
  - elevation: 5,157 ft (1,572 m)
- Mouth: Camden Bay
  - location: Beaufort Sea
  - coordinates: 70°04′42″N 145°33′56″W
  - elevation: 0 ft (0 m)
- Length: 125 mi (201 km)

The Canning River flows through parts of the North Slope in the U.S. state of Alaska. The river begins in the Franklin Mountains of the Brooks Range in the northeastern part of the state. It flows generally north for 125 miles (201 km) through the Arctic National Wildlife Refuge and enters Camden Bay west of Kaktovik on the Beaufort Sea.

== See also ==
- List of rivers of Alaska
