= Franklin Falls (disambiguation) =

Franklin Falls is a waterfall on the South Fork of the Snoqualmie River in the U.S. state of Washington.

Franklin Falls may also refer to:

- Franklin Falls Dam, US Army Corps of Engineers dam on the Pemigewasset River in New Hampshire
- Franklin Falls Historic District, National Register of Historic Places-listed district in Franklin, New Hampshire
- Franklin Falls Pond, on the Saranac River in the Adirondack Mountains, New York
- Franklin Falls, New York, hamlet on the Saranac River in town of Franklin, Franklin County, New York

== See also ==
- Franklin (disambiguation)
