= USS Franklin =

USS Franklin may refer to:

- USS Franklin (1775), a 6-gun schooner, fitted out in 1775 and returned to the owner in 1776
- USS Franklin (1795), an 8-gun brig built in 1795, captured by corsairs from Tripoli in 1802, bought back by the United States Navy in 1805, and sold in 1807
- USS Franklin (1815), a 74-gun ship of the line launched in 1815 and broken up in 1852
- USS Franklin (1864), a screw frigate launched in 1864 and in active service until 1877, thereafter used as a receiving ship until 1915
- USS Franklin (CV-13), an aircraft carrier commissioned in 1944 and crippled by bombs in March 1945, later repaired but remaining in reserve until stricken in 1964

== See also ==
- PS Benjamin Franklin
- USS Benjamin Franklin, a ballistic missile submarine;
- USS Bonhomme Richard, a U.S. Navy shipname referring to Benjamin Franklin;
- USS Franklin D. Roosevelt, an aircraft carrier;
- USCGC Point Franklin, a U.S. Coast Guard Point-class cutter;
- HMS Canopus, a British Royal Navy third-rate originally built in France as Franklin, before being captured at the Battle of the Nile and renamed;
- Franklin (disambiguation)
