= USS Bonhomme Richard =

Five ships of the United States Navy have borne the name Bonhomme Richard or Bon Homme Richard (pronounced [bɔnɔm ʁi.ʃaʁ]), the French language equivalent of "Goodman Richard". The name is in reference to American Founding Father Benjamin Franklin. Franklin was responsible for writing Poor Richard's Almanack, for which the ships have been named, after the French title of the publication.

- USS Bonhomme Richard (1765), formerly Duc de Duras, was a frigate built in France and placed at the disposal of John Paul Jones in 1779.
- A Bon Homme Richard was to have been a Wampanoag-class frigate built at the Washington Navy Yard. Construction was canceled in 1864.
- USS Bon Homme Richard (CV-10), was an aircraft carrier renamed Yorktown in 1943 prior to launch.
- USS Bon Homme Richard (CV-31), was an Essex-class aircraft carrier that saw action at the end of World War II, throughout the Korean War, and through the Vietnam War.
- USS Bonhomme Richard (LHD-6), was a Wasp-class amphibious assault ship that was severely damaged by fire in July 2020, and decommissioned in April 2021 and subsequently scrapped in Texas

== See also ==
- USS Franklin
