= Franklin County =

Franklin County may refer to:

== Australia ==
- Franklin County, New South Wales
- the former name of Franklin Land District, Tasmania

== New Zealand ==
- Franklin County, New Zealand

== United States ==
- Franklin County, Alabama
- Franklin County, Arkansas
- Franklin County, Florida
- Franklin County, Georgia
- Franklin County, Idaho
- Franklin County, Illinois
- Franklin County, Indiana
- Franklin County, Iowa
- Franklin County, Kansas
- Franklin County, Kentucky
- Franklin County, Maine
- Franklin County, Massachusetts
- Franklin County, Mississippi
- Franklin County, Missouri
- Franklin County, Nebraska
- Franklin County, New York
- Franklin County, North Carolina
- Franklin County, Ohio
- Franklin County, Pennsylvania
- Franklin County, Tennessee
- Franklin County, Texas
- Franklin County, Vermont
- Franklin County, Virginia
- Franklin County, Washington

== See also ==
- Franklin (disambiguation)
- Franklin Parish, Louisiana
- Franklin (independent city), Virginia
