= Mount Eisenhower =

Mountain in the American state of New Hampshire

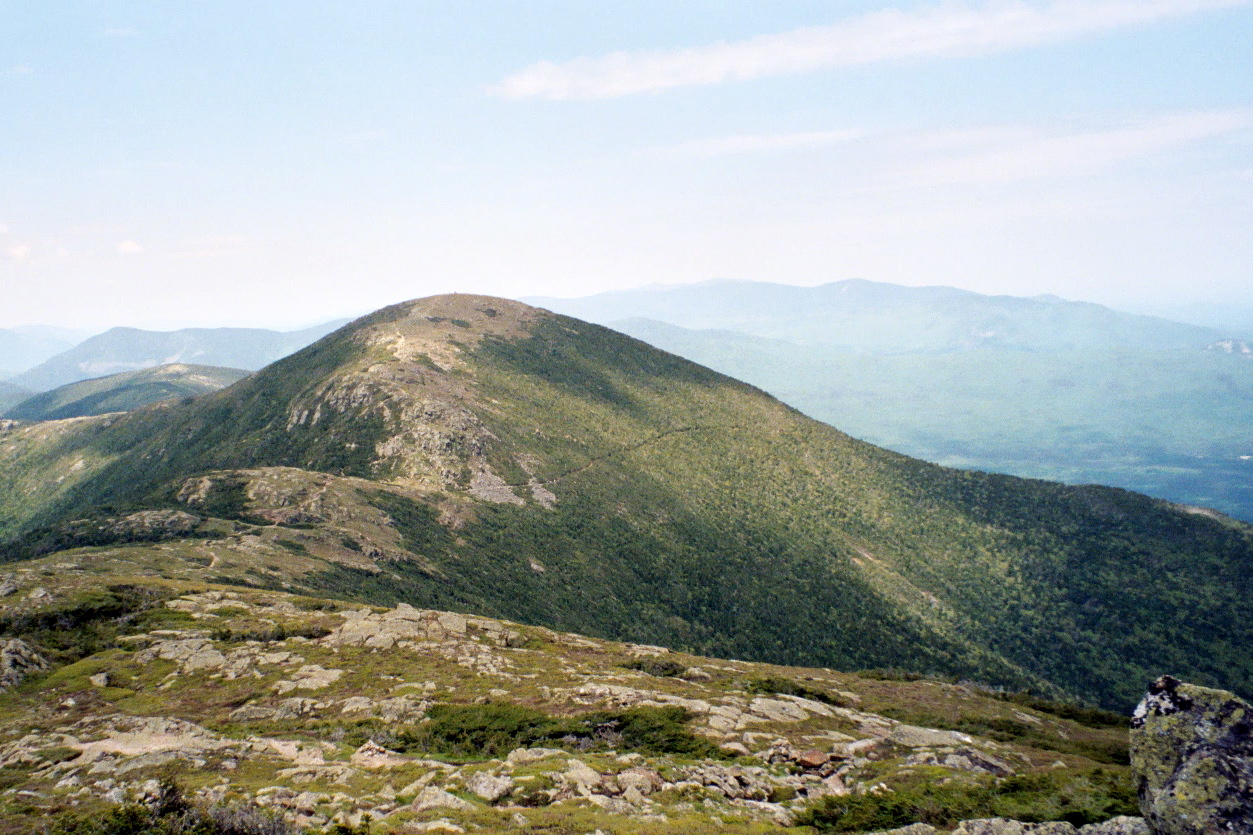
- Mount Eisenhower, June 2006

Highest point
- Elevation: 4,757 ft (1,450 m)
- Prominence: 353 ft (108 m)
- Listing: New England 4000-footer #12
- Coordinates: 44°14′26.64″N 71°21′0.65″W

Geography
- Location: Chandler's Purchase; Coös County, New Hampshire, U.S.
- Parent range: Presidential Range
- Topo map: USGS Stairs Mountain

Climbing
- First ascent: Possibly Darby Field in June 1642, though no one has proven this yet.
- Easiest route: Edmands Path, Mt. Eisenhower Loop

Mount Eisenhower, formerly Mount Pleasant, is a mountain in the Presidential Range in the White Mountains of New Hampshire approximately 4,757 feet (1,450 m) high. Named after President Dwight D. Eisenhower, its summit offers a 360° view. It is inaccessible by road.

The Crawford Path, carrying the Appalachian Trail, crosses the mountain near its summit. It separates from the summit loop trail at 4,400 feet (1,300 m), 0.3 mi (0.5 km) south of the summit, and rejoins it 0.3 mi (0.5 km) northeast of the summit, having made a net elevation gain of about 40 feet (12 m) and reached a maximum on Eisenhower of about 4,520 feet (1,380 m).

The mountain was known as Mount Pleasant until the New Hampshire Legislature voted in 1969 to name it after President Eisenhower, and the U.S. Board on Geographic Names agreed in 1970.

The shortest trail route to the summit of Eisenhower is from a parking lot on Mount Clinton Road, to its west-northwest, via primarily the Edmands Path. Several routes are available from points more or less southwest of it on Route 302; the most used of these (probably roughly equal in popularity to the Edmands route) is via the Crawford Path, starting from a parking lot on Mount Clinton Road, very near 302 and just north of the Highland Center in the Crawford Notch area. Mount Monroe lies on the ridge northeast of Mt. Eisenhower, and Mount Pierce to the southwest. All three of these peaks are included on the peak-bagging list of four-thousand footers in New Hampshire. Mount Franklin, an "unofficial" peak (not prominent enough to be included in the list), lies between Mount Eisenhower and Mount Monroe.

== Climate ==
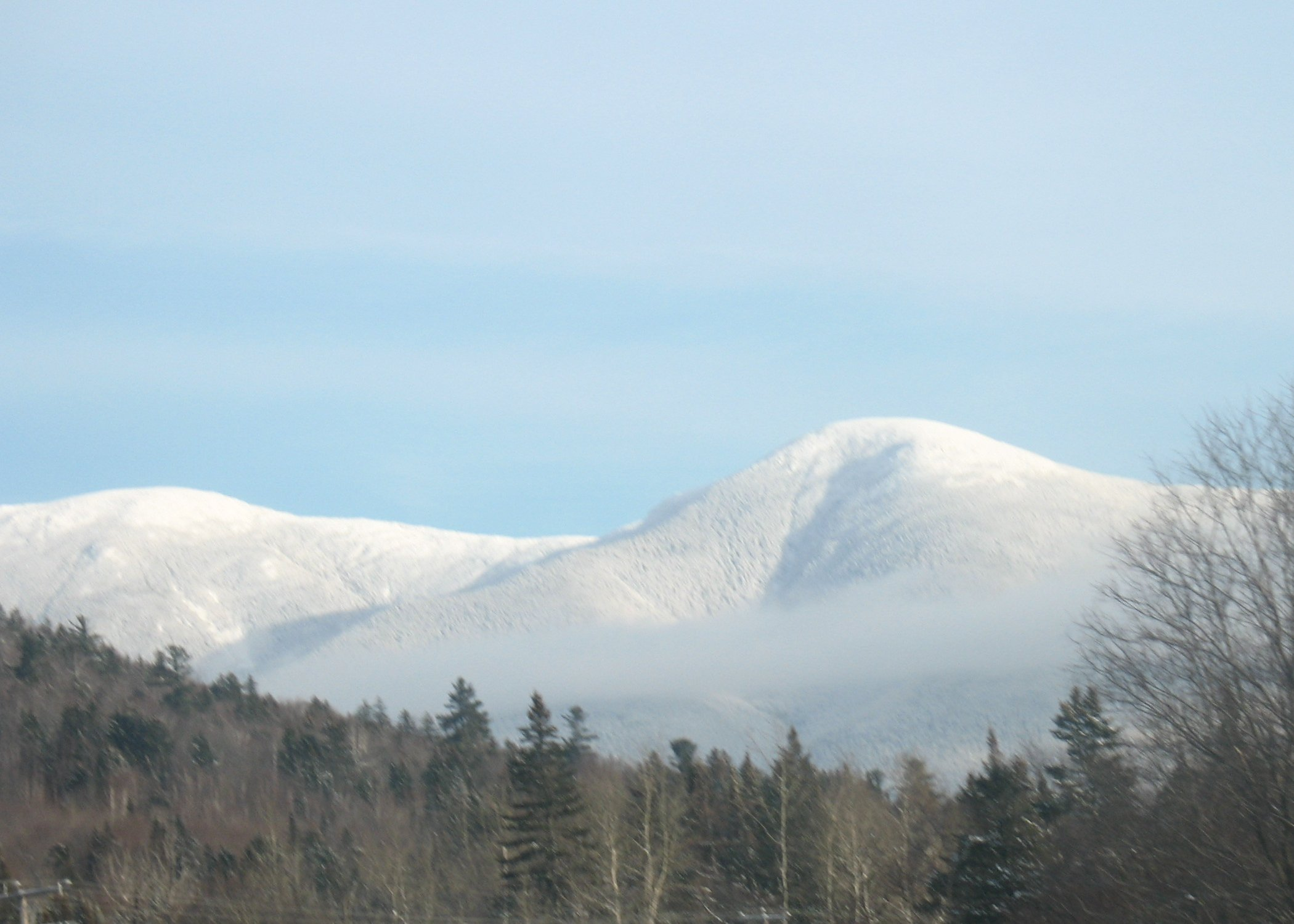
Mount Eisenhower, seen from US Hwy 302, near Bretton Woods. Mount Franklin is visible at the left.

Climate data for Mount Eisenhower 44.2436 N, 71.3506 W, Elevation: 4,318 ft (1,316 m) (1991–2020 normals)
Month	Jan	Feb	Mar	Apr	May	Jun	Jul	Aug	Sep	Oct	Nov	Dec	Year
Mean daily maximum °F (°C)	18.4 (−7.6)	20.6 (−6.3)	27.3 (−2.6)	40.2 (4.6)	53.0 (11.7)	61.4 (16.3)	65.8 (18.8)	64.6 (18.1)	59.0 (15.0)	46.6 (8.1)	33.1 (0.6)	23.8 (−4.6)	42.8 (6.0)
Daily mean °F (°C)	10.8 (−11.8)	12.2 (−11.0)	19.2 (−7.1)	31.6 (−0.2)	44.7 (7.1)	53.8 (12.1)	58.4 (14.7)	57.1 (13.9)	51.1 (10.6)	39.1 (3.9)	26.7 (−2.9)	16.9 (−8.4)	35.1 (1.7)
Mean daily minimum °F (°C)	3.1 (−16.1)	3.9 (−15.6)	11.1 (−11.6)	22.9 (−5.1)	36.3 (2.4)	46.1 (7.8)	51.1 (10.6)	49.7 (9.8)	43.2 (6.2)	31.5 (−0.3)	20.2 (−6.6)	9.9 (−12.3)	27.4 (−2.6)
Average precipitation inches (mm)	5.20 (132)	4.55 (116)	5.65 (144)	6.61 (168)	6.40 (163)	7.72 (196)	7.22 (183)	6.39 (162)	6.14 (156)	8.79 (223)	7.12 (181)	6.55 (166)	78.34 (1,990)
Source: PRISM Climate Group

== See also ==
- Eisenhower Memorial Wayside Park
