= Elizabeth Kelly (artist) =

New Zealand artist (1877–1946)

Elizabeth Kelly CBE
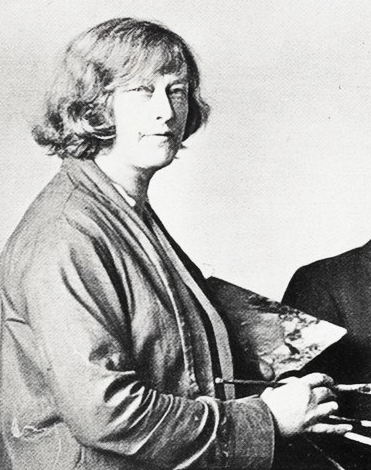
- Kelly in 1934
- Born: Annie Elizabeth Abbott; 12 April 1877; Christchurch, New Zealand
- Died: 4 October 1946 (aged 69); Christchurch, New Zealand
- Known for: Painting
- Spouse: Cecil Fletcher Kelly (m. 1908)

Annie Elizabeth Kelly CBE (née Abbott; 12 April 1877 – 4 October 1946) was a New Zealand artist best known for her portrait paintings. She was the first New Zealand woman to receive the CBE for services to art.

== Early years ==
Kelly was born in Christchurch on 12 April 1877, the eldest daughter of Maud Laura Abbott (née Mason) and Thomas George Abbott. She studied at the Canterbury College School of Art from 1892 to 1898, under Edith Munnings, Alfred Walsh and George Elliot Clark, the headmaster of the school. Kelly also had lessons from the Dutch artist Petrus Van der Velden, who was living and painting in Christchurch at the time. From 1901 to 1904, she taught as a member of the staff of the School of Art as a student teacher, having gained an art teacher’s certificate extramurally from the Department of Science and Art in Kensington, London.

== Early painting career ==
After leaving the art school, Kelly travelled to the United Kingdom for "a sketching tour in the 'Old Country' ", meeting with artists and visiting galleries in Britain and Europe. On her return journey, she made visits in South Africa and Australia.

In 1908, she married fellow artist Cecil Fletcher Kelly and the two painted landscapes together, and, in the 1920s, travelled to Britain and Europe. From the early 1920s, Kelly was a Canterbury Society of Arts council member and remained a regular exhibitor with the society all her life.

In 1920, as an official New Zealand war artist, Kelly was commissioned by the New Zealand Government to paint a posthumous portrait of New Zealand Victoria Cross winner Sergeant Henry James Nicholas

== Later career ==
By the 1930s, Kelly's portraits not only gathered honours in New Zealand but also overseas, in the United Kingdom and, in particular, France, where in 1934 she was awarded the Paris Salon silver medal by the Société des Artistes Français for her portrait of Miss Edith May. The medal made Kelly a key figure of 1930s art in New Zealand.

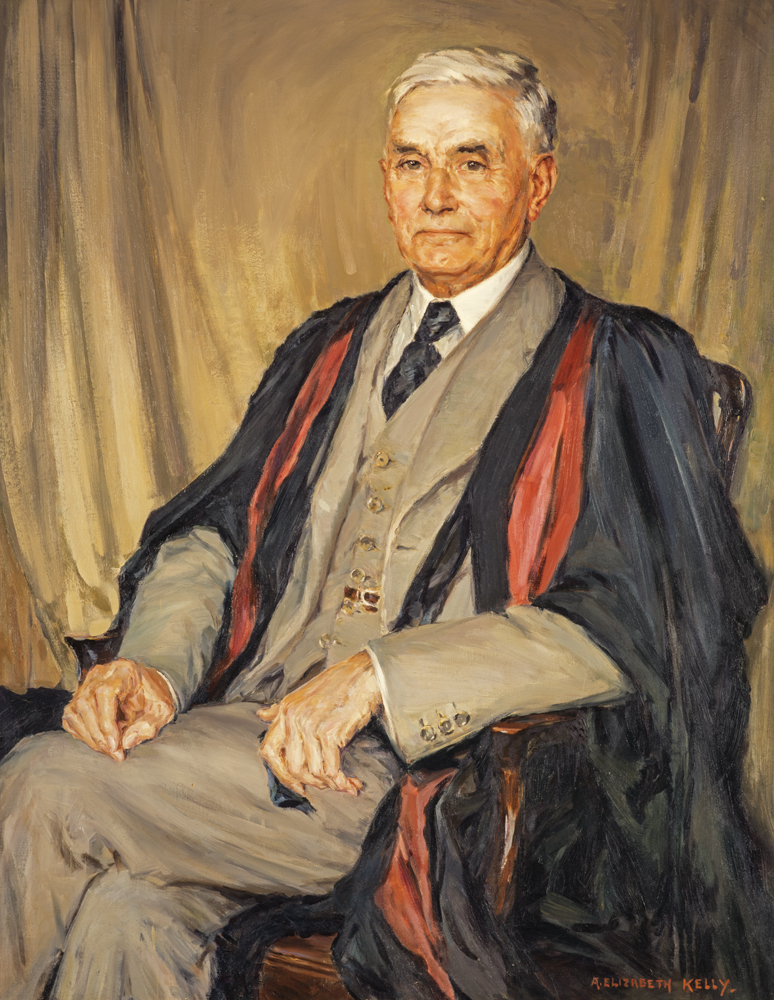
James Park (1857–1946), Geologist by Kelly

In 1931, Kelly exhibited a portrait of Edith Bryan at the Royal Academy of Arts in London and she exhibited at that academy several times thereafter. In 1932, she exhibited the same portrait at the Paris Salon of the Société des Artistes Français. In terms of formal portrait commissions, Kelly was in demand from early in her painting career. Amongst Kelly's commissioned works was her painting of James Park, who had been professor of mining and dean of the Faculty of Mining at the University of Otago. On its purchase in 1940 by the Scottish National Portrait Gallery in Edinburgh, Park became the first living Scotsman to have his portrait hung in the gallery. Kelly described her technique in relation to her painting of an official portrait of Sir Arthur Dobson, commissioned in 1934:

"... when I began work on the portrait ... I found that I was not getting the character into the hands that I would have liked ... they were restless hands, constantly moving. So I put them down on the canvas as I saw them—capable, finely moulded and, above all, restless."

In the 1938 King's Birthday Honours, Kelly was appointed a Commander of the Order of the British Empire, becoming the first New Zealand female artist to receive that honour.

== Death and legacy ==
Kelly died on 4 October 1946 in Christchurch. The Press reported an "outpouring of praise from fellow artists", including Nugent Welch, who noted that Kelly had "always been associated in my mind with Miss Richmond and Miss Stoddart as being one of the three outstanding women painters who have remained in this country to practise their art".

With the Second World War, attitudes had begun to shift and the post-war years saw a loss of interest in official portraits. The shift is also reflected in the waning interest in Kelly's work that followed her death in 1946.

Kelly had been born 38 years after the French painter Paul Delaroche's famous statement on seeing his first photograph: "From today painting is dead". However, as an artist she will be remembered as being personally responsible for a resurgence of interest in portrait painting in 1930s New Zealand. As art curator and writer Anne Kirker has noted, Kelly's talent in getting her portraits to look and feel like the sitter with a "restrained exuberance", particularly in the 1930s, "won acclaim from the art establishment in New Zealand".

Kelly's portraits were a mix of formal commissioned works alongside often more expressive paintings of family members, friends and acquaintances. In 1996, on the 50th anniversary of her death, the Robert McDougall Art Gallery in Christchurch staged a survey exhibition of her work.
