= Francklin =

Francklin may refer to:

- William Francklin (1763–1839), English orientalist and army officer
- Michael Francklin (1733–1782), Lieutenant Governor of Nova Scotia from 1766 to 1772
- Thomas Francklin (1721–1784), English academic, clergyman, writer and dramatist

== See also ==
- Franklin (disambiguation)
