= Robert Emmett Chambers =

Robert Emmett Chambers was a lawyer in St. Clairsville, Ohio who served as a state legislator from 1862 to 1863. He was a Democrat. He graduated from Franklin College in Ohio in 1853.

In 1858 he was a school superintendent in St. Clairsville. He was a judge for several years including in 1872 when he was a judge of the Common Pleas Court in Belmont County and Monroe County.

He was president of the St. Clairsville Cemetery Association in 1871.
