= Oersted (crater) =

Crater on the Moon

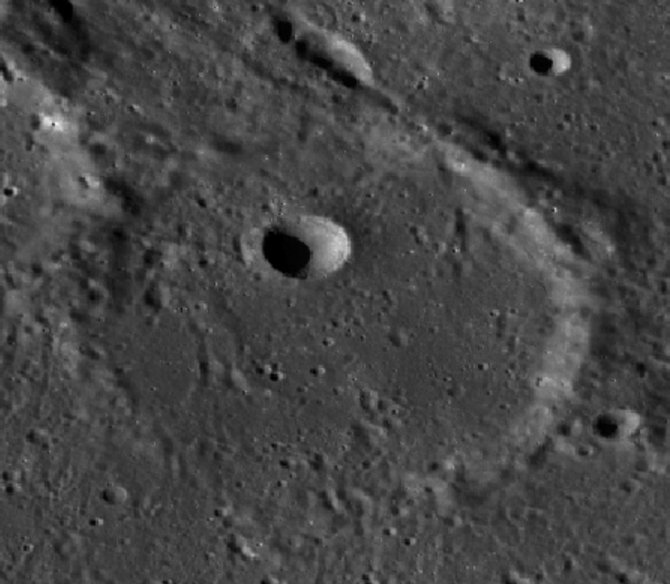
- LRO mosaic
- Coordinates: 43.1°N 47.2°E
- Diameter: 42 km
- Depth: None
- Colongitude: 42° at sunrise
- Eponym: Hans C. Ørsted

Oersted is a lunar impact crater that has been flooded by lava, leaving only a crescent-shaped rim with a gap to the southwest. The rim climbs to a maximum height of 1.7 km. This feature lies to the southeast of the crater Atlas, and southwest of Chevallier. To the south-southwest is Cepheus.

The northern rim of Oersted is overlain by a broken, lava-flooded craterlet. Just to the south is a younger, still-intact crater named Oersted A that was formed after Oersted was flooded. To the northwest, the flooded crater Oersted P is attached to the northwest arm of the outer rim.

== Satellite craters ==
By convention these features are identified on lunar maps by placing the letter on the side of the crater midpoint that is closest to Oersted.

Oersted	Latitude	Longitude	Diameter
A	43.4° N	47.2° E	7 km
P	43.6° N	46.0° E	21 km
U	42.4° N	44.6° E	5 km
