= Edith Munnings =

New Zealand artist and missionary (1867–1939)

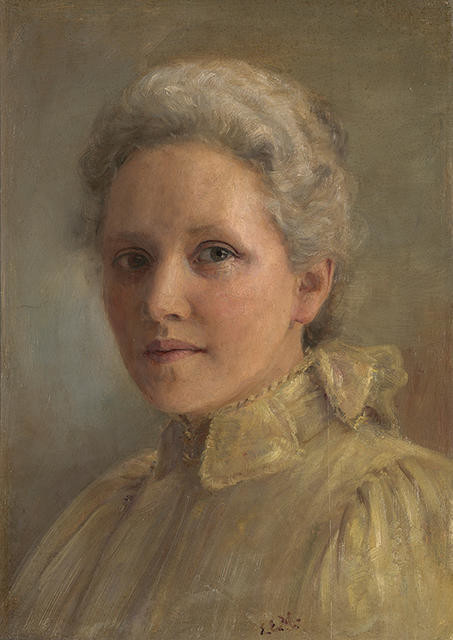
Self portrait

Edith Emma Munnings (5 May 1867 – 24 April 1939), later known as Edith Strutton, was a New Zealand artist and a missionary in India.

== Life ==
Munnings was one of 11 children of Joseph and Emma Munnings, pioneer settlers in Addington, Christchurch. One of her brothers, also named Joseph, became a school architect in New South Wales and also worked in India. The president of the Royal Academy of Art, Sir Alfred Munnings, was her cousin.

Munnings was one of the first-day pupils of the Canterbury College School of Art when it opened on 1 March 1882. In 1887, she was enrolled in evening classes at the school, and achieved an "excellence" in her end-of-year examination. In 1892, she joined the newly formed Palette Club, a group of artists who met weekly to study nature and offer each other help and constructive criticism. Her paintings were included in the club's exhibitions. In 1893, Munnings was appointed to the staff of the School of Art. One of her more notable students was Annie Elizabeth Kelly, who had a successful international career and received a CBE in 1938.

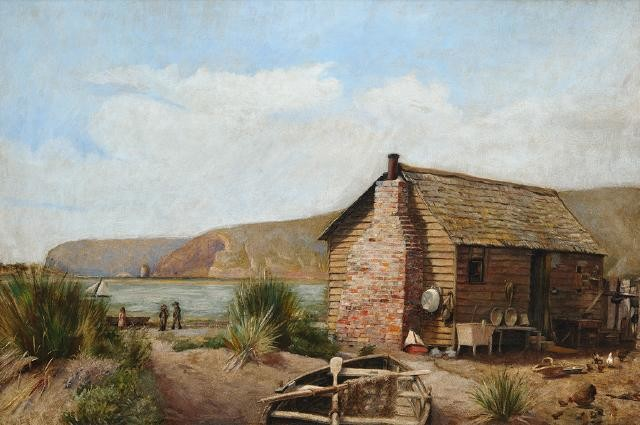
Fisherman’s Hut, Redcliffs by Munnings

In 1900, Munnings married Rev. Harry Strutton and together they joined an Australia Church of Christ mission in Baramati, India. In 1917 the couple took over responsibility for the Criminal Tribes Settlement at Solapur, and some years later they moved to Lonavala, where Munnings died in 1939. Munnings continued to paint while in India, predominantly landscapes with figures.

In 2007, her painting Fisherman's Hut, Redcliffs was included in the Christchurch Art Gallery's exhibition "I See Red."
