= Franklin station =

Franklin station may refer to:

== United States ==
=== California ===
- Franklin station (Sacramento), a light rail station in Sacramento

=== Illinois ===
- Franklin Park station, a commuter rail station in Franklin Park
- Belmont Avenue station, a commuter rail station in Franklin Park, also known as Franklin Park-Belmont Avenue
- Chicago station (CTA Brown and Purple Lines), an elevated station in Chicago, sometimes called Chicago/Franklin

=== Massachusetts ===
- Franklin station (Massachusetts), a commuter rail station in Franklin

=== New York ===
- Franklin Square station (IRT Third Avenue Line), a demolished elevated station in New York City
- Franklin Street station (IRT Broadway–Seventh Avenue Line), a subway station in New York City
- Franklin Street station (IRT Sixth Avenue Line), a former elevated station in New York City
- Franklin Street station (IRT Ninth Avenue Line), a former elevated station in New York City

=== Pennsylvania ===
- Franklin Square station, a rapid transit station in Philadelphia
- Franklin Street station (Pennsylvania), a bus station and former railroad station in Reading
- Ben Franklin Station, a proposed renaming of 30th Street Station in Philadelphia

== Other places ==
- Franklin station (Calgary), a light rail station in Calgary, Alberta, Canada
- Franklin metro station, a metro station in Santiago, Chile
- Franklin D. Roosevelt station, a Paris Metro station

== See also ==
- Franklin Avenue Station (disambiguation)
- Franklin (disambiguation)
