= Franklin, Wisconsin =

Franklin, Wisconsin can refer to several places:

- Franklin, Jackson County, Wisconsin, a town
- Franklin (community), Jackson County, Wisconsin, an unincorporated community
- Franklin, Kewaunee County, Wisconsin, a town
- Franklin, Manitowoc County, Wisconsin, a town
- Franklin, Milwaukee County, Wisconsin, a city
- Franklin, Sauk County, Wisconsin, a town
- Franklin, Sheboygan County, Wisconsin, an unincorporated community
- Franklin, Vernon County, Wisconsin, a town
