= Berzelius (crater) =

Crater on the Moon

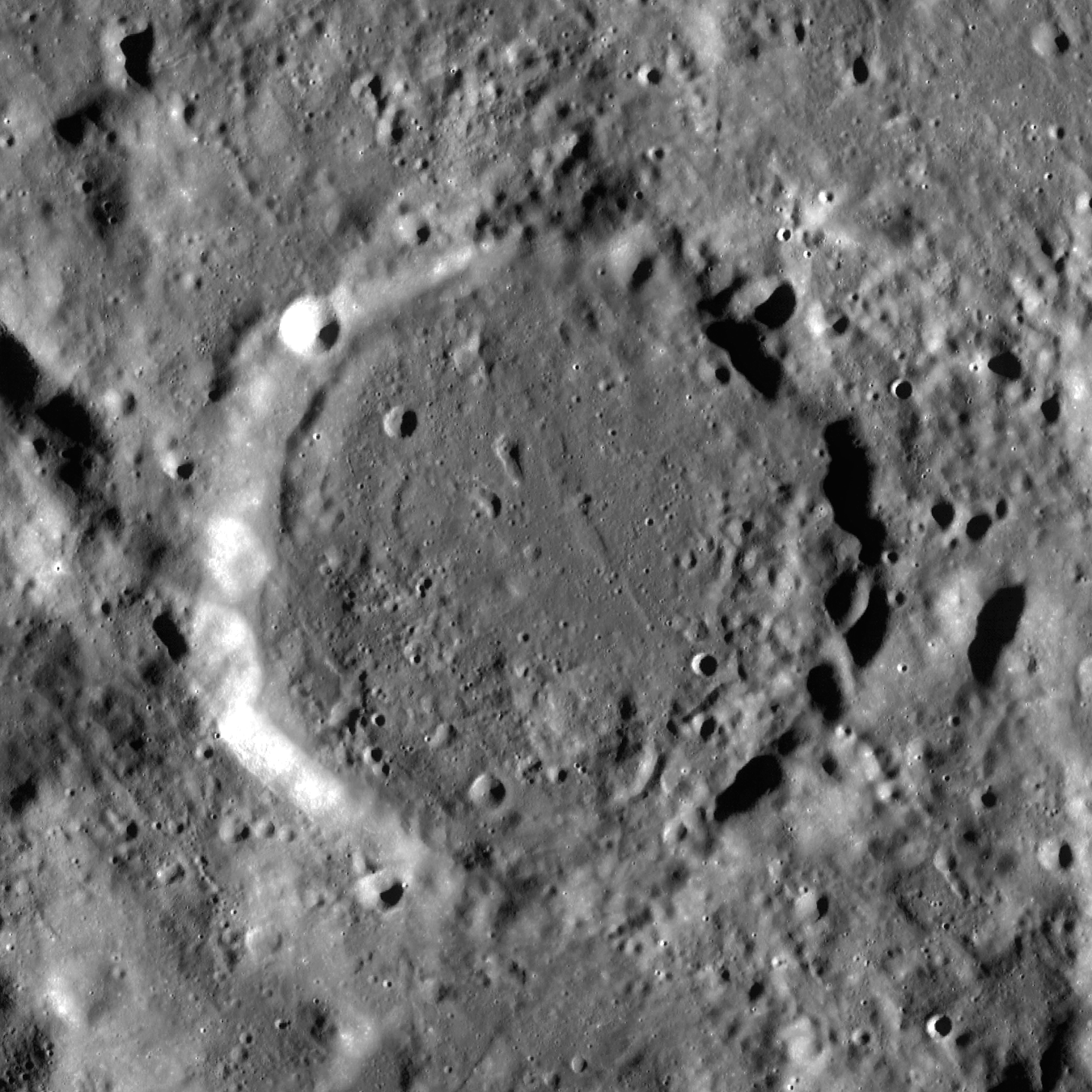
- LRO image
- Coordinates: 36.55°N 50.95°E
- Diameter: 48.53 km (30.16 mi)
- Depth: 1.7 km (1.1 mi)
- Colongitude: 310° at sunrise
- Eponym: Jöns J. Berzelius

Berzelius is a lunar impact crater located in the northeast part of the Moon's near side. It lies to the southeast of the crater Franklin, and to the northwest of Geminus.

Berzelius is a low, eroded formation with a fairly level interior floor and a small, ridge-like rim. There are several tiny craterlets along the rim, and the wall is nearly gone along the southern side – it consists of little more than a low, wide ridge. The interior floor is marked by a few tiny craterlets.

This crater is named after Swedish chemist Jöns J. Berzelius (1779-1848). The name was incorporated into lunar nomenclature by German astronomer Johann Mädler. Its designation was officially adopted by the International Astronomical Union in 1935.

== Satellite craters ==
By convention these features are identified on lunar maps by placing the letter on the side of the crater midpoint that is closest to Berzelius.

Berzelius	Coordinates	Diameter
A	36.74°N 48.87°E	8 km
B	32.31°N 43.10°E	25 km
F	32.85°N 46.02°E	11 km
K	35.57°N 47.03°E	6 km
T	36.25°N 47.96°E	9 km
W	38.14°N 53.10°E	7 km
