= Franklin, California =

Franklin, California may refer to:

- Franklin, Los Angeles County, California
- Franklin, Merced County, California
- Franklin, Napa County, California
- Franklin, Sacramento County, California
- Franklin, San Joaquin County, California
