= John Franklin (comedian) =

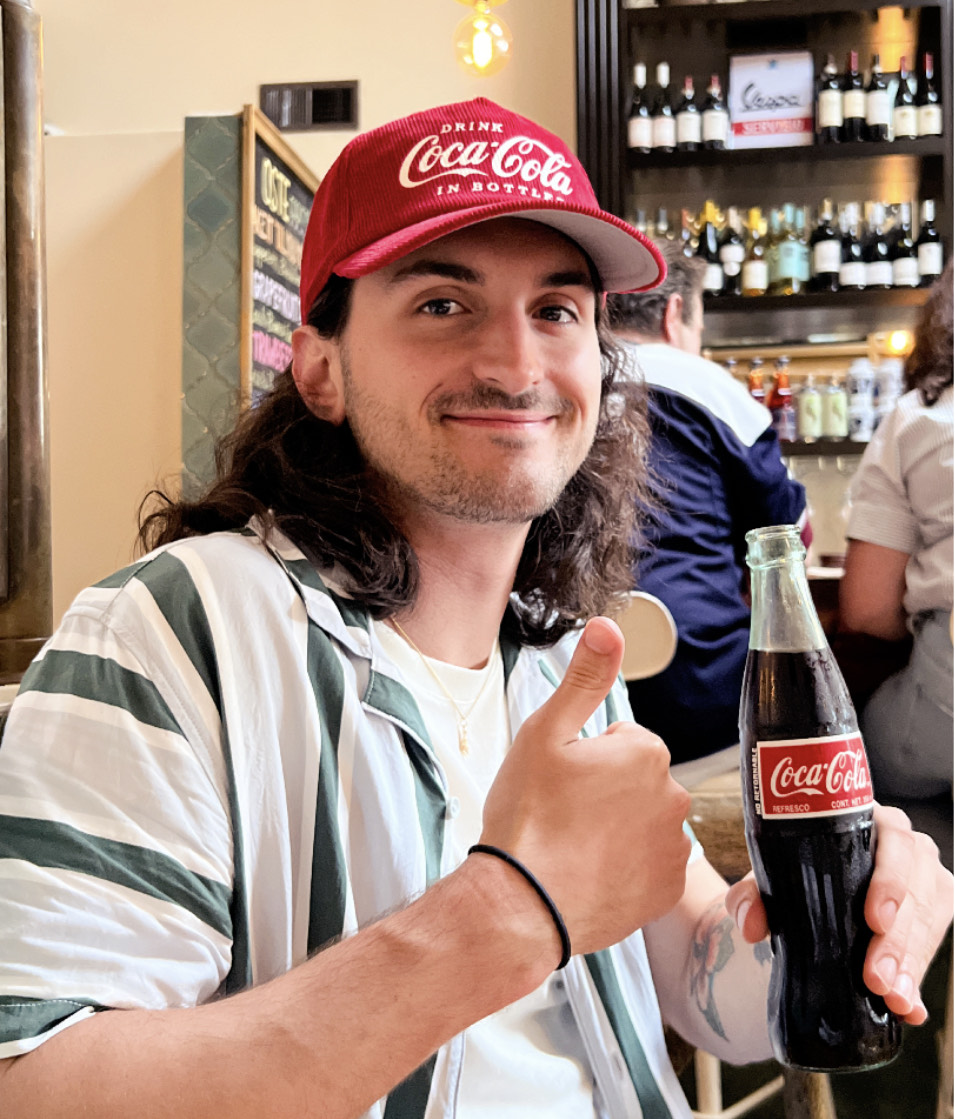
- Franklin in 2022
- Born: West Caldwell, New Jersey
- Education: Quinnipiac University (BA)
- Occupations: Actor, stand-up comedian, television personality
- Years active: 2020–present

John Franklin is an American comedian and media personality. He is best known for his Amazon Prime comedy special, The Specialist. He also known for his appearance in Netflix's The Circle (2022).

== Early life and education ==
Franklin was born and raised in West Caldwell, New Jersey, to Italian American parents. He has a younger sister. He attended James Caldwell High School, where he graduated from in 2015, and went on to attend Quinnipiac University, Connecticut, attaining a bachelor's degree in broadcast journalism in 2019 and master's degree in interactive media in 2020.

== Career ==
Before his breakout role participating in The Circle, Franklin worked in Wentworth Institute of Technology and then iHeartMedia, after graduating. He worked as a radio host and a sports reporter respectively. After his involvement in The Circle, he was given his exclusive Amazon Prime comedy special titled The Specialist. He is also known for his stand-up comedy show, My Dad's Advice, at the Edinburgh Festival Fringe.

== Filmography ==
=== Television ===
Year	Title		Notes
2022	The Circle	Contestant	Netflix show
2023	The Specialist	Stand-up comedy special	Amazon Prime show
