= Franklin, New York =

Franklin, New York may refer to:

- Franklin, Franklin County, New York, a town in Franklin County
- Franklin, Delaware County, New York, a town in Delaware County
- Franklin (village), New York, in Delaware County's town of Franklin
- Williamstown, New York, formerly known as Franklin

== See also ==
- Franklin County, New York
