= Franklin Sound =

Coordinates: 40°17.5′S 148°12.5′E

Franklin Sound south of Flinders Island

Franklin Sound is a narrow waterway between the two largest islands, Flinders Island and Cape Barren Island in the Furneaux Group, at the southeastern end of Bass Strait, between Victoria and Tasmania, Australia.

== History ==
Named after British explorer and Lieutenant-Governor of Van Diemen's Land (1836–1843), Sir John Franklin (1786–1847).

Numerous sandbanks and small islands obstruct the sound and the tidal stream runs at 2 to 3 knots.
