= Cepheus (crater) =

Crater on the Moon

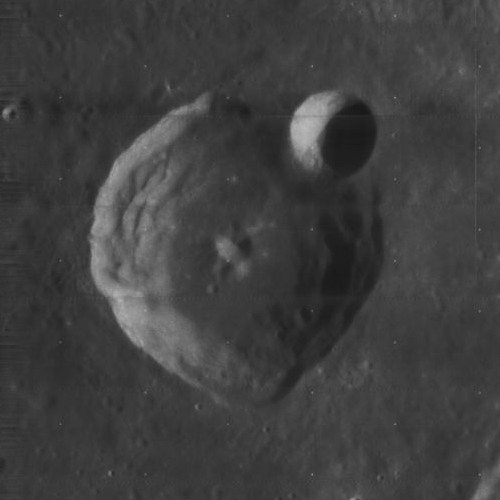
- Lunar Orbiter 4 image
- Coordinates: 40.8°N 45.8°E
- Diameter: 39.43 km (24.50 mi)
- Depth: 2.8 km (1.7 mi)
- Colongitude: 315° at sunrise
- Formation: Eratosthenian
- Eponym: Cepheus, a King of Aethiopia

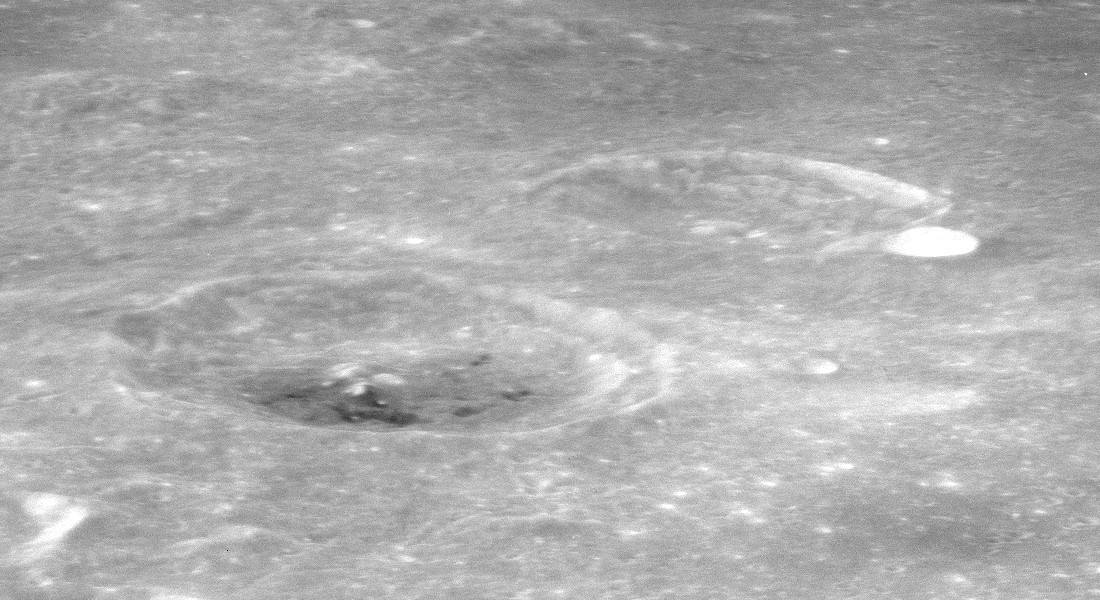
Oblique view of Franklin (lower left) and Cepheus (upper right), from Apollo 16

Cepheus is a lunar impact crater that is located in the northeastern part of the Moon, within one crater diameter of the larger crater Franklin to the southeast. To the north-north-east is the flooded crater Oersted. The proximity of the Cepheus formation to the lunar limb means it appears oblong when viewed from the Earth due to foreshortening.

This is a relatively fresh formation, formed during the Eratosthenian period, and the rim is still sharp and well-defined. The exception is an even younger, bowl-shaped crater that lies across the northeast rim. This is a satellite crater designated Cepheus A. The remaining rim is nearly circular, with outward bulges to the north and south.

The inner wall is terraced in places, most notably along the northwest wall. There is a central peak formation at the midpoint of the floor which stretches somewhat to the north and south. The lunar regolith surrounding the crater shows a radar-dark halo, suggesting the deposited material is depleted in meter-sized blocks.

The crater is named after Cepheus, the mythological King of Aethiopia in the legend of Perseus. His name was incorporated into lunar nomenclature by Italian selenographer Giovanni B. Riccioli in 1651, although it was originally applied to the nearby crater now called Franklin. Its designation was officially adopted by the International Astronomical Union in 1935.

== Satellite craters ==
By convention these features are identified on lunar maps by placing the letter on the side of the crater midpoint that is closest to Cepheus.

Cepheus	Latitude	Longitude	Diameter
A	41.0° N	46.5° E	13 km
