= Franklyn (name) =

Franklyn is both a surname and given name. Notable people with the name include:

Surname:

- Adrian Franklyn (1899–1986), British military pilot
- Charles Franklyn (1896–1982), British medical doctor * Chevelle Franklyn, (born 1974), Jamaican gospel singer
- Delano Franklyn, Jamaican politician
- George Woodroffe Franklyn (1800–1870), British politician
- Harold Franklyn (1885–1963) British soldier of the world wars
- John Franklyn-Robbins (1924–2009), British actor
- Milt Franklyn (1897–1962), Musical composer and arranger
- Sabina Franklyn (born 1954), English actress and William Franklyn's daughter
- William Franklyn (1925–2006), British actor

Given name:

- Franklyn Ajaye (born 1949), American stand-up comedian
- Franklyn Barrett (1873–1964), Australian film director and cinematographer
- Franklyn Baur (1903–1950), vocal recording artist
- Franklyn Bellamy, British actor
- Franklyn Dennis (born 1947), Canadian international cricketer
- Franklyn Farnum (1878–1961), American screen character actor
- Franklyn Germán (born 1980), Dominican Republic baseball pitcher
- Franklyn Gracesqui (born 1979), Dominican Republic baseball pitcher
- Franklyn Hinds (born 1967), Cayman Islands cricketer
- Franklyn Kilome, baseball player
- Franklyn MacCormack (1906–1971), American radio personality
- Franklyn Modell (1917–2016), American cartoonist
- Franklyn Rose (born 1972), West Indian cricketer
- Franklyn Seales (1952–1990), American film, television and stage actor
- Franklyn Bliss Snyder (1884–1958), American scholar of Scottish literature
- Franklyn Stephenson (born 1959), Barbadian cricketer
- Franklyn Wilson (born 1947), Bahamian businessman and politician

Place:

- Franklyn, South Australia

== See also ==
- Franklyn B Paverty, Australian bush band
- Franklin (disambiguation)
