= Mount Franklin (Southland) =

Mountain in New Zealand

Coordinates: 45°54′12″S 167°54′11″E

Mount Franklin is a mountain in New Zealand. Located to the south of the Takitimu Mountains at the edge of the Southland Plains, this 418 metres (1,371 ft) promontory rises above the nearby town off Ohai. Mount Franklin was named by surveyor James McKerrow after John Franklin, who perished in 1847 trying to navigate the Northwest Passage in the Arctic Ocean.
