= John Franklin (footballer) =

English footballer

John L.Franklin
Personal information
- Full name: John Leonard Franklin
- Date of birth: 27 November 1924
- Place of birth: Stockton, County Durham, England
- Date of death: March,3 ,2005 (aged 79-80
- Place of death: Sedgefield, Stockton, County Durham, England
- Position: Forward

Senior career*
Years	Team	Apps	(Gls)
1943–194?	Middlesbrough	0	(0)
1946–1947	Bath City		
1947–1948	Darlington	8	(3)
–	Stockton		
- * Club domestic league appearances and goals

John Leonard Franklin (27 November 1924 – March,3, 2005) was an English footballer who played in the Football League for Darlington.

Franklin was born in Stockton-on-Tees, County Durham, and signed for Middlesbrough during the Second World War, but only played for them in the wartime competitions. He joined Southern League club Bath City in 1946, and, playing at inside right, scored on his debut in the opening match of the season, a 4–3 defeat at home to Gillingham. In 1947, he signed for Darlington, for whom he scored three goals from eight appearances in the Third Division North, one of which came from what the West Hartlepool-based Northern Daily Mail called "an apparently offside position" to settle the match against local rivals Hartlepools United in Darlington's favour. He went on to play non-league football for Stockton. Franklin died in Stockton on March 3, 2005 at the age of 80.
