= USCGC Point Franklin =

Point-class cutter

History

United States
- Name: USCGC Point Franklin (WPB-82350)
- Namesake: Point Franklin, Alaska
- Owner: United States Coast Guard
- Builder: J.M. Martinac Shipbuilding Corp.
- Commissioned: 14 November 1966
- Decommissioned: 23 June 1998
- Fate: Transferred to Venezuela. 3 August 1998

General characteristics
- Type: Patrol Boat (WPB)
- Displacement: 60 tons
- Length: 82 ft 10 in (25.25 m)
- Beam: 17 ft 7 in (5.36 m) max
- Draft: 5 ft 11 in (1.80 m)
- Propulsion: 1966 • 2 × 800 hp (597 kW) Cummins diesel engines; 1990 • 2 × 800 hp (597 kW) Caterpillar diesel engines
- Speed: 22.9 knots (42.4 km/h; 26.4 mph)
- Range: 542 nmi (1,004 km) at 18 kn (33 km/h; 21 mph); 1,500 nmi (2,800 km) at 9.4 kn (17.4 km/h; 10.8 mph)
- Complement: Domestic service : 8 men
- Armament: 1966 • 1 × [Mk 2 Mod 0 MG /81mm Mortar and Browning .50 Caliber machine gun]

USCGC Point Franklin (WPB-82350) was an 82-foot (25 m) Point class cutter constructed at the J.M. Martinac Shipbuilding Corp. yards at Tacoma, Washington in 1966 for use as a law enforcement and search and rescue patrol boat.

== Construction and design details ==
Point Franklin was built to accommodate an 8-man crew. She was powered by two 800 hp (597 kW) VT800 Cummins diesel main drive engines and had two five-bladed 42 in (1.1 m) propellers. Water tank capacity was 1,550 U.S. gallons (5,900 L) and fuel tank capacity was 1,840 U.S. gallons (7,000 L) at 95% full. After 1990 she was refit with 800 hp (597 kW) Caterpillar diesel main drive engines. Engine exhaust was ported through the transom rather than through a conventional stack and this permitted a 360 degree view from the bridge; a feature that was very useful in search and rescue work as well as a combat environment.

The design specifications for Point Franklin included a steel hull for durability and an aluminum superstructure and longitudinally framed construction was used to save weight. Ease of operation with a small crew size was possible because of the non-manned main drive engine spaces. Controls and alarms located on the bridge allowed one man operation of the cutter thus eliminating a live engineer watch in the engine room. Because of design, four men could operate the cutter; however, the need for resting watchstanders brought the crew size to eight men for normal domestic service. The screws were designed for ease of replacement and could be changed without removing the cutter from the water. A clutch-in idle speed of three knots helped to conserve fuel on lengthy patrols and an eighteen knot maximum speed could get the cutter on scene quickly. Air-conditioned interior spaces were a part of the original design for the Point class cutter. Interior access to the deckhouse was through a watertight door on the starboard side aft of the deckhouse. The deckhouse contained the cabin for the officer-in-charge and the executive petty officer. The deckhouse also included a small arms locker, scuttlebutt, a small desk and head. Access to the lower deck and engine room was down a ladder. At the bottom of the ladder was the galley, mess and recreation deck. A watertight door at the front of the mess bulkhead led to the main crew quarters which was ten feet long and included six bunks that could be stowed, three bunks on each side. Forward of the bunks was the crew's head complete with a compact sink, shower and commode.

== History ==
After commissioning, Point Franklin was stationed at Cape May, New Jersey, where she was used for law enforcement and search and rescue operations. On 26 November 1967, she took a wounded crewman to the hospital from MV Timaru Star 45 miles south southwest of Delaware Light Station.

On 1 March 1968, the distressed FV Bright Star was escorted 25 miles south east of Cape May to safe waters by Point Franklin. On 17 August, she assisted the distressed MV Green Lake 25 miles South east of Ocean City, Maryland. Point Franklin came to the aid of a 19-foot pleasure craft on 25 August 1969 near Ocean City. On 12 December she towed the disabled sailboat Dora to Ocean City.

After a collision off Cape May with the MV Concordia Sun, the disabled FV Sharron Ann was towed by Point Franklin to safety on 26 November 1970. She seized the tug Capstan 240 miles east of Cape Charles carrying 30 tons of marijuana in December 1985. On 15 December 1986, she fought a fire on the tug Kathryne McAllister 5 miles east of Avalon, New Jersey.

From commissioning to 1978, Point Franklin was commanded by enlisted chief petty officers, which are termed officers-in-charge since they do not hold a commission. In 1978, junior officers with the rank of lieutenant, junior grade were made commanding officers. From 1992 to decommissioning the responsibility of command reverted to officers-in-charge with the rank of master chief petty officer.

Point Franklin was decommissioned 23 June 1998 and transferred to Venezuela on 3 August 1998
