= Franklin College =

Franklin College may refer to:

in Switzerland

- Franklin University Switzerland formerly known as Franklin College Switzerland

in the United Kingdom

- Franklin College, Grimsby, England

in the United States

- Franklin College (established 1787), Lancaster, Pennsylvania. Known as "Franklin and Marshall College" since 1853
- Franklin College of Arts and Sciences (established 1801), Athens, Georgia, a founding component of University of Georgia
- Franklin College (Indiana) (established 1834), Franklin, Indiana
- Franklin College (New Athens, Ohio), Harrison County, Ohio, a former college in village of New Athens that operated from 1818 to 1919
- Franklin College (Tennessee), a former college in Davidson County, Tennessee, that operated from 1844 until the American Civil War
- Franklin College (Yale University), a residential college at Yale University
- Franklin University (established 1902), Columbus, Ohio
