= Battle of Franklin (disambiguation) =

The Battle of Franklin was a major battle of the American Civil War. It was fought at Franklin, Tennessee, on November 30, 1864, as part of the Franklin–Nashville Campaign.

Battle of Franklin may also refer to:

== American Civil War ==
- Battle of Franklin (1863), a minor engagement on April 10, 1863, in Williamson County, Tennessee
- Joint Expedition Against Franklin, fought October 3, 1862, in Franklin, Virginia, and the nearby Blackwater River
- Battle of Irish Bend, fought April 14, 1863, near Franklin, Louisiana

== Other uses ==
- Battle of Franklin (1788), a skirmish between the governments of North Carolina and the unrecognized State of Franklin

== See also ==
- Battle of Franklin's Crossing, a skirmish during the Gettysburg campaign
