= Franklin (crater) =

Crater on the Moon

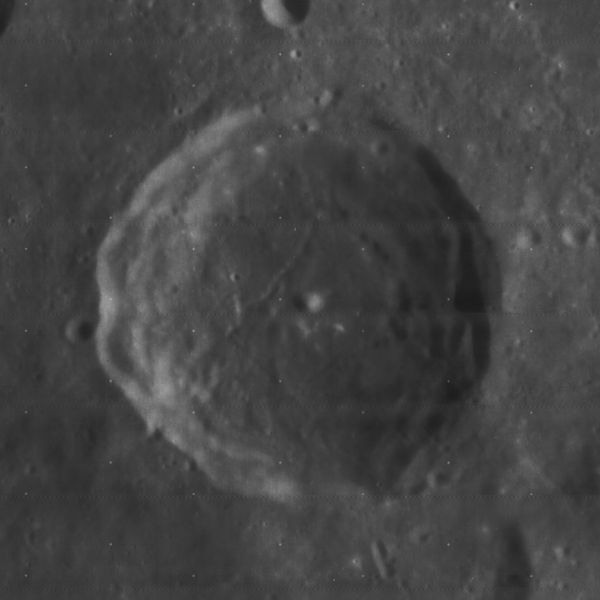
- Lunar Orbiter 4 image
- Coordinates: 38.8°N 47.7°E
- Diameter: 55.92 km (34.75 mi)
- Depth: 2.7 km (1.7 mi)
- Colongitude: 313° at sunrise
- Formation: Late Imbrian
- Eponym: Benjamin Franklin

Franklin is a lunar impact crater that is located in the northeast part of the visible Moon. To the north-northwest is the smaller crater Cepheus, and in the opposite direction to the southwest is the shallow Berzelius.

This crater dates to the Late Imbrian period on the lunar geologic timescale. The rim of Franklin is generally circular, with a pair of outward bulges in the western wall. It rises to hights of up to 3.4 km. The inner wall is terraced, and there is a small central peak at the midpoint of the floor. Dark mantle material covers much of the interior floor, giving it a lower albedo. A narrow cleft runs to the west-southwest across the floor, passing to the north of the central peak. The crater includes a small pyroclastic deposit.

This crater is named after American inventor Benjamin Franklin (1706-1790). The designation was officially adopted by the International Astronomical Union in 1935. It was originally named Cepheus by Italian selenographer Giovanni B. Riccioli in 1651.

== Satellite craters ==
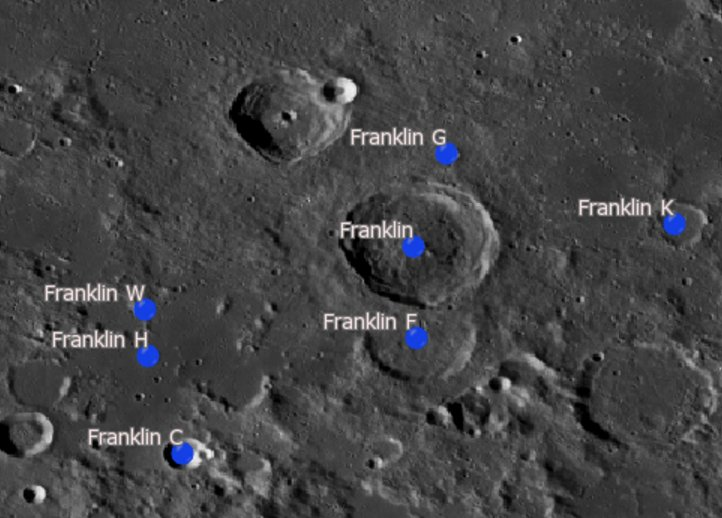
Satellite features and surroundings

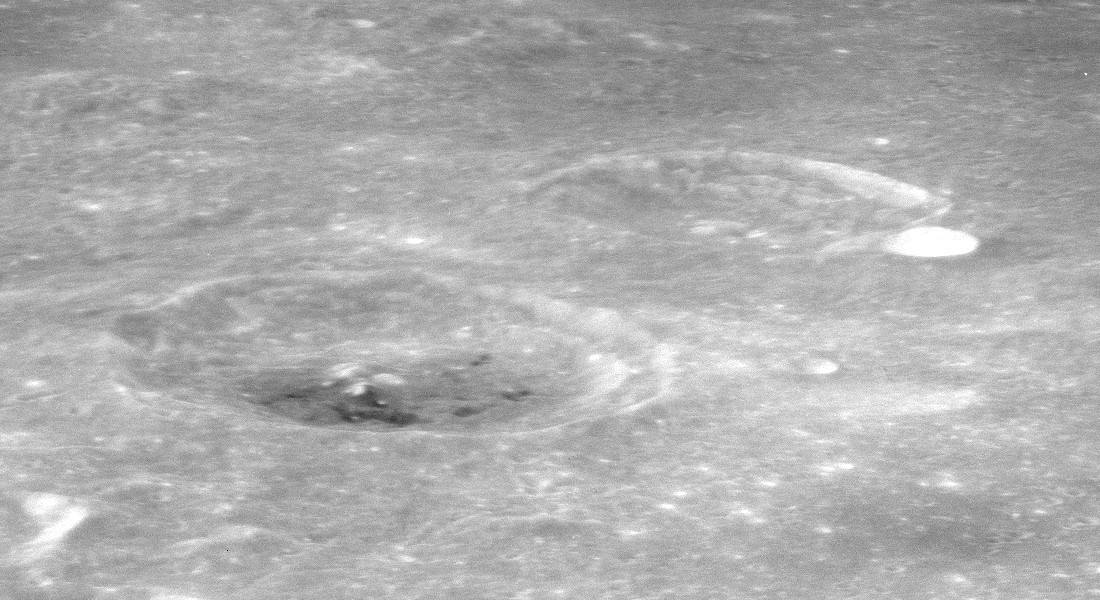
Oblique view of Franklin (lower left) and Cepheus (upper right), from Apollo 16

By convention these features are identified on lunar maps by placing the letter on the side of the crater midpoint that is closest to Franklin.

Franklin	Latitude	Longitude	Diameter
C	35.7° N	44.3° E	15 km
F	37.5° N	47.7° E	38 km
G	40.1° N	48.1° E	7 km
H	37.1° N	43.7° E	6 km
K	39.1° N	51.4° E	20 km
W	37.8° N	43.7° E	6 km
