= Sir John Franklin (disambiguation) =

Sir John Franklin (1786–1847) was a British naval officer and Arctic explorer, whose last expedition to the Arctic was famously lost.

Sir John Franklin may also refer to:

== Ships ==
- CCGS Sir John Franklin (1979), a Canadian Coast Guard icebreaker
- SS Sir John Franklin, a mid-20th-century U.S. flagged ship out of New York City, involved in Kwong Hai Chew v. Colding [344 U.S. 590 (1953)]
- Sir John Franklin-class, a research ship class of the Canadian Coast Guard; see List of equipment of the Canadian Coast Guard
  - CCGS Sir John Franklin (2017), a Canadian Coast Guard research ship

== Schools ==
- Sir John Franklin Junior High School (Calgary), Alberta, Canada
- Sir John Franklin Elementary School, Vancouver, British Columbia, Canada
- Sir John Franklin High School, Yellowknife, Northwest Territories, Canada
- Sir John Franklin Secondary Modern School, Lincolnshire, England, UK

== Other uses ==
- Sir John Franklin (fl. 1785), Lord Mayor of Cork, Ireland; see List of mayors of Cork
- BEA's Vickers Viscount G-ALWF "Sir John Franklin" (airliner); see British European Airways

== See also ==
- Sir John Franklin School (disambiguation)
- CCGS Sir John Franklin, a Canadian Coast Guard shipname list of ships
