= Mount Franklin (West Coast) =

New Zealand mountain

- Location within New Zealand
- Interactive map of Mount Franklin

Highest point
- Elevation: 1,862 m (6,109 ft)
- Prominence: 262 m (860 ft)
- Isolation: 2.39 km (1.49 mi)
- Coordinates: 44.064674°S 169.054572°E

Geography
- Location: South Island
- Country: New Zealand
- Region: West Coast
- Protected area: Mount Aspiring National Park
- Parent range: Browning Range
- Topo map(s): NZMS260 F38; Topo50 BZ12

Mount Franklin is located within Mount Aspiring National Park. Part of the Browning Range, it overlooks the Okuru River, 20 kilometres (12 mi) northwest of Makarora, and rises to a height of 1,862 metres (6,109 ft).

== Climate ==
Based on the Köppen climate classification, Mount Franklin is located in a marine west coast climate zone. Prevailing westerly winds blow moist air from the Tasman Sea onto the mountain, where the air is forced upwards by the mountains (orographic lift), causing moisture to drop in the form of rain and snow. The months of December through February offer the most favourable weather for viewing or climbing this peak.
