= Mount Franklin (New Hampshire) =

Mountain in New Hampshire, United States

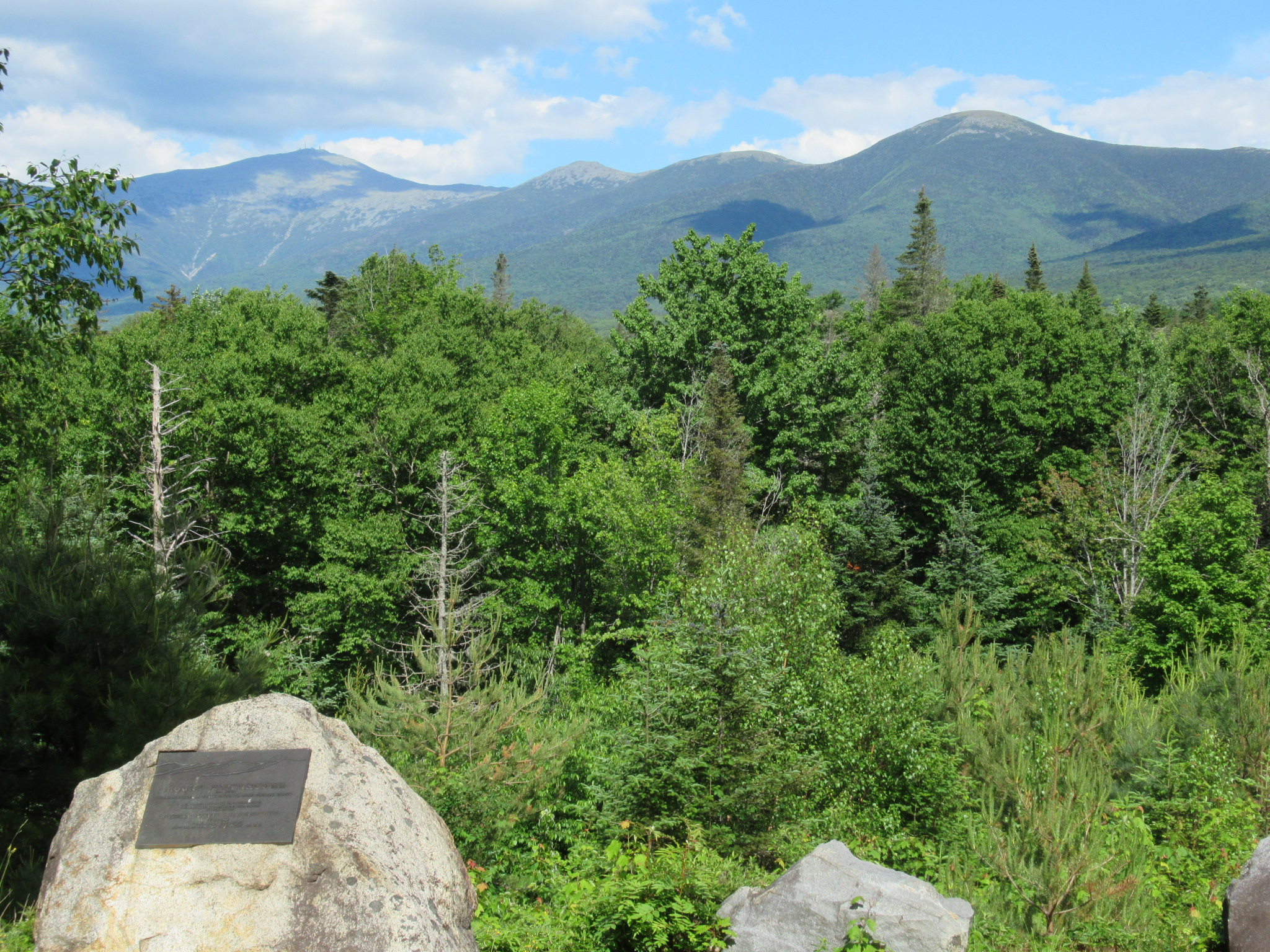
- The southern Presidential Range viewed from the west, with (L-R): Mount Washington, Mount Monroe, Mount Franklin, and Mount Eisenhower

Highest point
- Elevation: 5000+ ft (1524+ m)
- Prominence: 25 ft (7.6 m)
- Parent peak: Mount Monroe
- Coordinates: 44°14′58″N 71°19′50″W

Geography
- Location within New Hampshire Location within the United States
- Country: United States
- State: New Hampshire
- District: Coös County
- Subdivision: Sargent's Purchase
- Parent range: Presidential Range
- Topo map: USGS Stairs Mountain

Climbing
- Easiest route: Hike

Mount Franklin is a mountain in Coös County, New Hampshire, United States. The mountain is named after Benjamin Franklin and is part of the Presidential Range of the White Mountains, although Franklin was not a president. Mount Franklin is flanked to the northeast by Mount Monroe, and to the southwest by Mount Eisenhower.

Mount Franklin drains on the northwest side into the Ammonoosuc River, thence into the Connecticut River and into Long Island Sound in Connecticut. On the southeast side, Franklin drains into the Dry River, thence into the Saco River, and into the Gulf of Maine in Maine.

The Appalachian Trail, a 2,170-mile (3,490 km) National Scenic Trail from Georgia to Maine, crosses Mount Franklin as it traverses the main ridge of the Presidentials from Crawford Notch to the summit of Mount Washington. Franklin stands on the northwest side of the Dry River Wilderness.

Although well over 4,000 feet (1,200 m) in height, the Appalachian Mountain Club doesn't consider Franklin a "four-thousand footer" because it stands no more than 65 feet (20 m) above the col on the ridge from Mount Monroe, making it a secondary summit of that peak.

== See also ==
- List of mountains in New Hampshire
- White Mountain National Forest
