= Franklin Mountains (Alaska) =

Mountain range in northern Alaska

Coordinates: 69°08′24″N 145°26′20″W

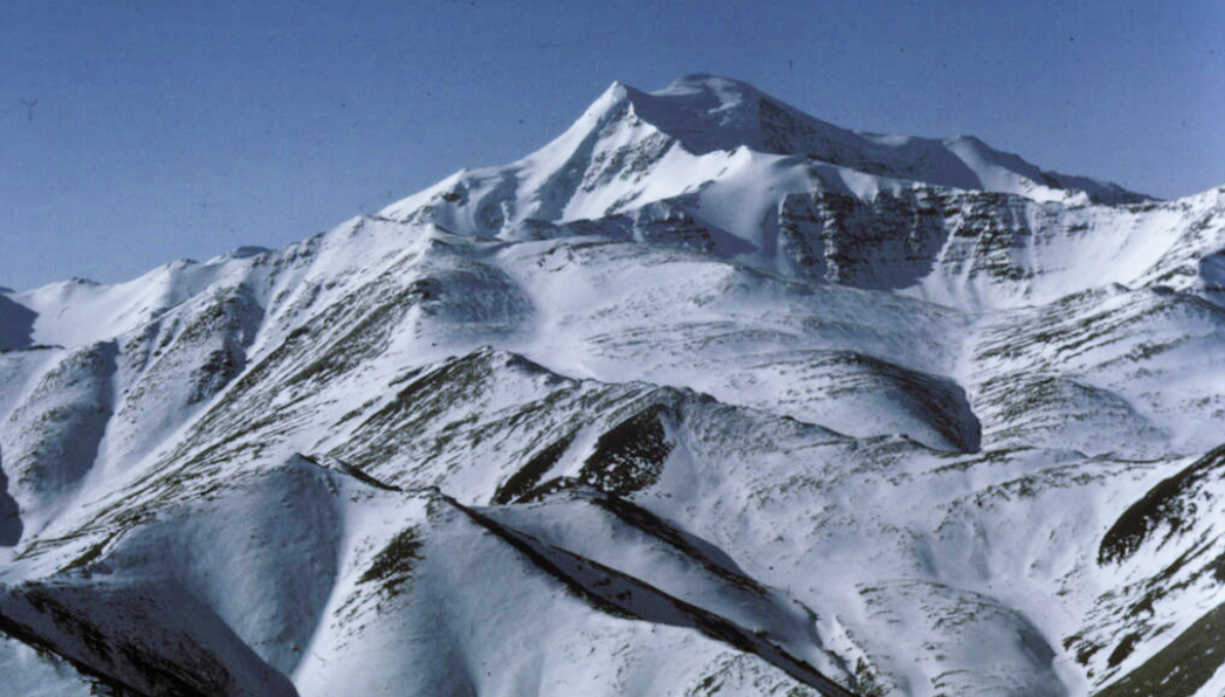
View of Mount Chamberlin

The Franklin Mountains are part of the Brooks Range in the North Slope Borough of the U.S. state of Alaska.
