= Franklin (surname) =

Franklin is a surname. Notable people with the surname include:

- Franklin (baseball), baseball player in 1884
- A. B. Franklin (born 1948), member of the Louisiana House of Representatives
- Aaron D. Franklin, American electrical engineer
- Alex Franklin (born 1988), Puerto Rican basketball player
- Allan Franklin (born 1938), American physicist, historian, and philosopher
- Aretha Franklin (1942–2018), American singer, songwriter, and pianist
- Benjamin Franklin (1706–1790), a Founding Father of the United States
- Benjamin Franklin (disambiguation), multiple people
- Bonnie Franklin (1944–2013), American actress
- Bruce Franklin (guitarist), American musician
- Buck Colbert Franklin (1879–1960), American lawyer
- Carl Franklin (born 1949), American filmmaker
- Cheryl J. Franklin, American writer
- C. L. Franklin (1915–1984), Detroit, Michigan-based Baptist minister and civil rights activist
- Charles Franklin (disambiguation), multiple people
- Charles Samuel Franklin (1879–1964), British radio pioneer
- Christian Franklin (born 1999), American baseball player
- Christine Ladd-Franklin (1847–1930), American psychologist and logician
- Deborah Morris Franklin (1736–1787), Quaker patriot who cared for prisoners of war
- Diane Franklin (born 1962), American actress and model
- Dwight Franklin (1888–1971), American artist, taxidermist and set designer
- Edward C. Franklin (1928–1982), American pioneering immunologist and physician
- Eric Franklin (born 1957), Swiss dancer
- Farrah Franklin (born 1981), American R&B singer and actress
- Frederic Franklin (1914–2013), British-American ballet dancer and director
- Frederick Franklin (1840–1873), United States Navy sailor
- Gertrude Franklin (1858–1913), American singer and music educator
- Gilbert Franklin (1919–2004), American sculptor, educator
- Gretchen Franklin (1911–2005), English actress
- Guitar Pete Franklin (1928–1975), American blues singer, musician and songwriter
- H. Bruce Franklin (born 1934), American cultural historian
- Hugh Franklin (actor) (1916–1986), American actor
- Hugh Franklin (suffragist) (1889–1962), British political activist
- Isaac Franklin (1789–1846), American slave trader and plantation owner
- James Franklin (naturalist) (c. 1783–1834), British soldier and brother of Sir John Franklin.
- James Franklin (American football coach) (born 1972), head coach of Penn State Nittany Lions football team
- Jane Franklin (1791–1875), wife of John Franklin, British Royal Navy officer, Governor of Van Diemen's Land and Arctic explorer
- Janet Franklin (1959–present), American geographer and landscape ecologist
- Jentezen Franklin (born 1962), American evangelical pastor, author, and televangelist
- Jessie Franklin Turner (1881–1956), American fashion designer.
- Joe Franklin (1926–2015), American radio and television host personality, author and actor
- Joe L. Franklin (1906–1982), American scientist
- John Franklin (disambiguation)
- Joseph Paul Franklin (1950–2013), American serial killer
- Josiah Franklin (1657–1745), English businessman and father of Benjamin Franklin
- Kam Franklin (born 1987), American singer-songwriter
- Kam Franklin (American football) (born 2005), American football player
- Kenneth Franklin (1923–2007), American astronomer
- Kirk Franklin (born 1970), American choir director and singer-songwriter
- Lance "Buddy" Franklin (born 1987), Australian Rules Football player, Hawthorn Football Club
- Larry Franklin, U.S. Air Force Reserve colonel involved in AIPAC espionage scandal
- Lawson D. Franklin (1804–1861), American planter, slave trader and businessman
- Lehman Franklin, American politician
- Lynn Franklin (1946–2021), American writer
- Lonnie Franklin (1952–2020), prolific American serial killer and rapist
- Marc A. Franklin (1932–2020), American lawyer
- Melissa Franklin (born 1956), Canadian experimental particle physicist
- Melvin Franklin (1942–1995), American bass singer
- Michael Franklin (disambiguation), multiple people
- Miles Franklin (1879–1954), Australian writer and feminist
- Missy Franklin (born 1995), American competitive swimmer and Olympian
- Morris Franklin (1801–1885), New York politician and President of New York Life Insurance Co.
- Nobia A. Franklin (1892–1934), American entrepreneur
- Pamela Franklin (born 1950), British actress
- Patricia Franklin, British actress
- Philip Albright Small Franklin (1871–1939), American shipping executive, in charge of the White Star Line office and terminus in New York at the time of the Titanic disaster
- Philip Franklin (1898–1965), American mathematician and professor primarily focused on analysis
- Rich Franklin (born 1974), American mixed martial arts fighter
- Rick Franklin (born 1952), American Piedmont blues guitarist, singer and songwriter
- Robert Franklin (disambiguation), multiple people
- Rosalind Franklin (1920–1958), English physical chemist and crystallographer
- Sam Franklin (American football) (born 1996), American football player
- Sam Franklin (soccer), American soccer player in the 1990s and 2000s
- Scott Franklin (born 1980), Canadian rugby player
- Selim Franklin (1814–1885), American pioneer, auctioneer, real estate agent, chess master, and Canadian legislator
- Shirley Franklin (born 1945), American politician
- Stan Franklin (1931–2023), American mathematician, computer scientist and cognitive scientist
- Susan Braley Franklin (1868–1955), American classical scholar and educator
- Tori Franklin (born 1992), American triple jumper
- Ursula Franklin (1921–2016), Canadian metallurgist, physicist, author, and educator
- Walter Franklin (disambiguation), multiple people
- William Franklin (disambiguation), multiple people
- Zaire Franklin (born 1996), American football player

== Fictional characters ==
- Abi Franklin, character in the British television soap opera, Coronation Street
- Benjamin Miles "C-Note" Franklin, character in Prison Break
- Mattie Franklin, superhero in Marvel Comics
- Reggie Franklin / A-Train, superhero in the television franchise The Boys

== See also ==
- Franklin (class) in medieval England
