= Equitable Building (Manhattan) =

Office skyscraper in Manhattan, New York

- U.S. National Register of Historic Places
- U.S. National Historic Landmark
- U.S. Historic district – Contributing property
- New York State Register of Historic Places
- New York City Landmark
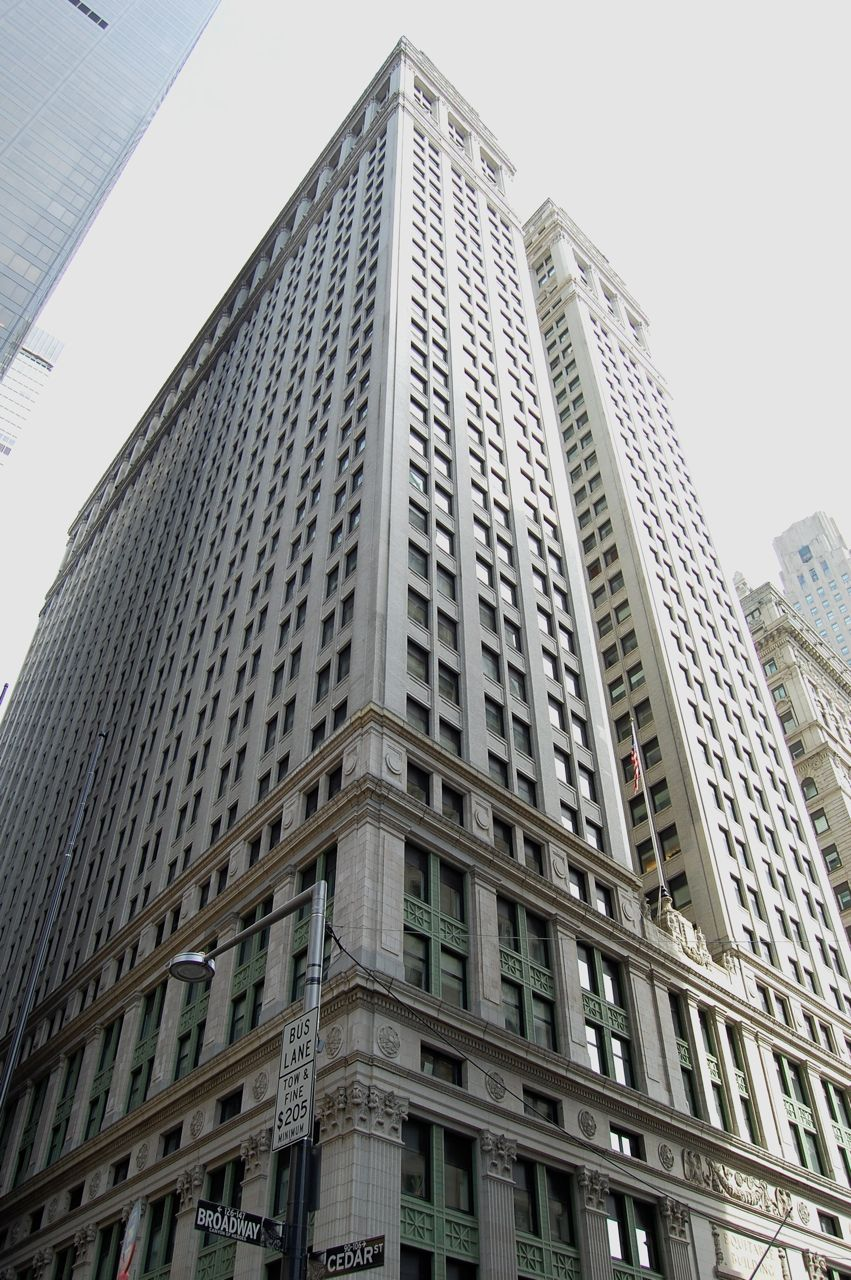
- The building in 2010
- Location: 120 Broadway; Manhattan, New York City
- Coordinates: 40°42′30″N 74°00′37″W
- Built: 1913–1915
- Architect: Ernest R. Graham
- Architectural style: Neoclassical
- Part of: Wall Street Historic District (ID07000063)
- NRHP reference No.: 78001869
- NYSRHP No.: 06101.001692
- NYCL No.: 1935

Significant dates
- Added to NRHP: June 2, 1978
- Designated NHL: June 2, 1978
- Designated CP: February 20, 2007
- Designated NYSRHP: June 23, 1980
- Designated NYCL: June 25, 1996

The Equitable Building is an office skyscraper located at 120 Broadway, between Pine and Cedar streets, in the Financial District of Lower Manhattan, in New York City. The skyscraper was designed by Ernest R. Graham in the Neoclassical style, with Peirce Anderson as the architect-in-charge. It is 555 feet (169 m) tall, with 38 stories and 1.2 million square feet (110,000 m^{2}) of floor space. The building's articulation consists of three horizontal sections similar to the components of a column, namely a base, shaft, and capital.

The Equitable Building replaced the Equitable Life Building, the previous headquarters of the Equitable Life Insurance Company, which burned down in 1912. Work on the Equitable Building started in 1913 and was completed in 1915. Upon opening, it was the largest office building in the world by floor area. The Equitable Building hosted a variety of tenants and, by the 1920s, was the most valuable building in New York City. The Equitable Life Insurance Company, the building's namesake, occupied a small portion of the building until it moved out during 1960. The owner as of 2022, Silverstein Properties, purchased the Equitable Building in 1980 and has renovated it multiple times.

Upon its completion, the Equitable Building was controversial because of its lack of setbacks, which prevents sunlight from reaching the surrounding ground. This contributed to the adoption of the first modern building and zoning restrictions on vertical structures in Manhattan, the 1916 Zoning Resolution. The building was designated a National Historic Landmark in 1978 and was designated a city landmark by the New York City Landmarks Preservation Commission in 1996. It is also a contributing property to the Wall Street Historic District, a NRHP district created in 2007.

== Site ==
The building occupies the entire block bounded by Broadway to the west, Cedar Street to the north, Nassau Street to the east, and Pine Street to the south. The dimensions of the block are irregular. The building has a frontage of approximately 167 feet (51 m) on Broadway, 312 feet (95 m) on Cedar Street, 152 feet (46 m) on Nassau Street, and 304 feet (93 m) on Pine Street. (Note: Sources disagree on the exact dimensions, but these are accurate to about 3 feet (0.91 m) of each other. The "frontage" of this building is the length of each side of the building at street level but, due to the irregular quadrilateral shape, is distinct from the width.) The plot is shaped like a trapezoid, with the Nassau Street and Broadway frontages being almost parallel. The plot covers about 48,000–49,000 square feet (4,500–4,600 m^{2}); according to the New York City Department of City Planning, the building has a lot area of 49,614 square feet (4,609.3 m^{2}). The building is assigned its own ZIP Code, 10271; it was one of 41 buildings in Manhattan that had their own ZIP Codes as of 2019.

There are numerous buildings and structures immediately adjacent to the Equitable Building. Zuccotti Park is located to the northwest, while 140 Broadway is to the north and 28 Liberty Street is to the northeast. Federal Hall National Memorial is to the southeast and 14 Wall Street and the American Surety Building are to the south. Across Broadway to the west and southwest are the Trinity and United States Realty Buildings.

== Architecture ==
The Equitable Building, an early skyscraper, was designed by Ernest R. Graham of D. H. Burnham & Company (later Graham, Anderson, Probst & White), (Note: D. H. Burnham & Company was renamed Graham, Burnham & Co. in 1912; the firm later became Graham, Anderson, Probst & White.) with Peirce Anderson as the architect-in-charge. In contrast to the contemporary Metropolitan Life Insurance Company Tower, Singer Building, and Woolworth Building, the Equitable Building was designed as a bulky mass, rather than a "slender, romantic tower". This was affected by the fact that the other three buildings were corporate symbols from renowned architects, while the Equitable Building was a speculative development whose designer had little experience in New York City. The ultimate design was distinct from corporate structures such as the Met Life Tower or restrained office buildings such as the Flatiron Building, and raised substantial controversy upon its completion.

The articulation consists of three horizontal sections similar to the components of a column, namely a base, shaft, and capital. The exterior is inspired from Greek and Roman architecture. In total, it is 555 feet (169 m) tall when the penthouse's center tower is included; a separate measurement of 545 feet (166 m) is given when measured to the top of the other penthouses, and the height excluding any of the penthouses is 525 feet (160 m).

=== Form ===
Although the Equitable Building is 40 stories tall with 555 feet (169 m), this includes two stories in the building's penthouses as well as two "interior stories" that are not visible from the facade. The interior stories are located at the 3rd and 34th floors, and there are three basement levels. The exterior of the building thus consists of 36 stories with a total height of 525 feet (160 m). Originally, the structure was proposed as a 42-story skyscraper, but this was reduced to 36 effective stories to maximize elevator safety and speed, given the assumption that 50,000 people visited the building each day and that there were 48 elevators that could each serve 1,200 people an hour.

The Equitable Building has no setback from the street beyond the depth of the sidewalk. This is because Graham wanted the building to have the latest technological systems, such as elevators, heating, ventilation, and fireproofing, while also maximizing usable office space. Two light courts (recesses), one each to the east and west, bisect the facades above the seventh floor. As a result, the Equitable Building appears in the shape of the letter H when viewed from above. The design of the Equitable Building is similar to that of the now-demolished Hudson Terminal office buildings and the 49 Chambers building. The two-story penthouse is 30 feet (9.1 m) tall; the penthouse roof is 20 feet (6.1 m) tall, but the center tower rises another 10 feet (3.0 m).

=== Facade ===
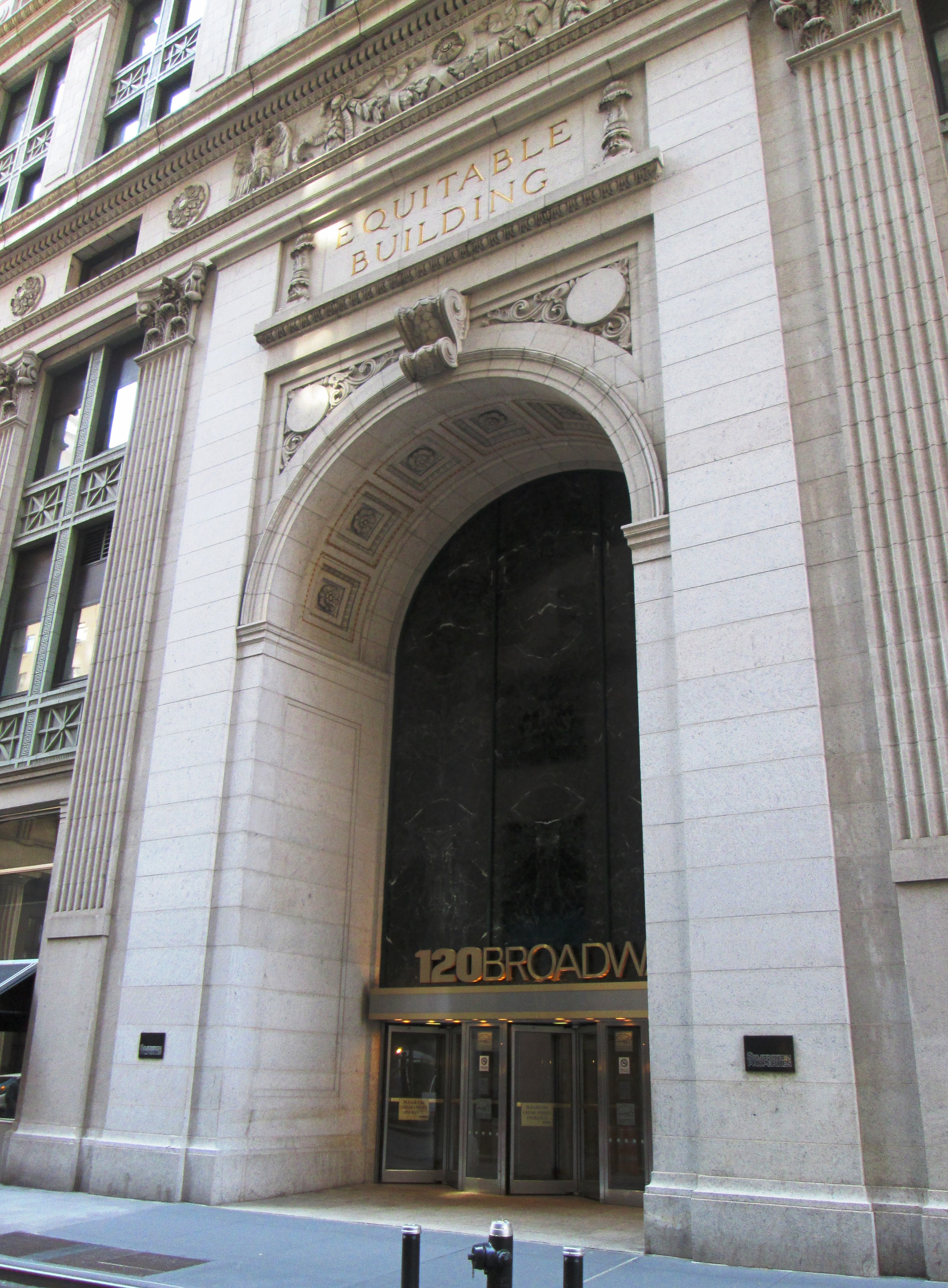
Building entrance

The building's facade is made of brick, granite, and terracotta, and white Yule Marble and iron are also used in the building. The granite, brick, and marble were estimated to be 250,000 short tons (220,000 long tons; 230,000 t). Anderson designed the facade with a base, shaft, and capital, similar to the Broadway–Chambers Building by Cass Gilbert, but with facades on all sides. The building contains eighteen vertical window bays each on the Pine and Cedar Street facades, and seven bays each on the Broadway and Nassau Street facades, three on each wing of the "H". The window bays each consist of two windows on each floor, except the center bay on Broadway and Nassau Street, which includes three windows on the 5th through 7th floors.

The lowest four stories were made of granite, while the 5th through 7th stories have a facade of granite and terracotta. On Broadway and Nassau Street, there are Corinthian-style pilasters, which are 54 feet (16 m) tall and topped by ornamented capitals. Double-height arches with three revolving doors are located at the centers of these facades. Above this is a plaque reading equitable building on the third story, as well as an ornamented terracotta frieze at the fourth story, which is 12 feet (3.7 m) wide. The entrances on Cedar Street and Pine Street are more plainly designed with narrower square arches; the doors are located below green marble panels. The remaining windows on the first floor are stainless-steel show windows, which illuminate the commercial spaces inside. Though most of the commercial space is accessed from the lobby, there is also a service entrance and a shop entrance from the Cedar Street side. The window openings on the second, third, fifth, and sixth floors are separated by vertical mullions and horizontal spandrel panels made of green terracotta. Flagpoles hang from the seventh story.

The 8th through 38th stories were made of light gray brick and matching terracotta trim. On the Broadway and Nassau Street facades, the light court divides the primary facades into two wings, each with three window bays. The portions of the facade facing these light courts are faced with brick. Medallions with cornices are located at the corners of the building at the 7th and 31st floors. There is no ornamentation on the 8th through 30th floors, while there are belt courses below the 31st and 32nd floors. The facade between the 32nd and 35th floors is composed of a colonnade with terracotta pilasters between each column of windows, topped by ornamented capitals. The colonnade terminates at the top of the 35th floor, where there is an elaborate cornice. Another belt course separates the 36th and 37th floors, and a cornice is located above the 38th floor.

The top of the building, composed of the penthouse, is faced with brick and terracotta. It contains pilasters similar to the lower sections of the building. The main penthouse, atop the center of the "H", has dimensions of 85 by 120 feet (26 by 37 m). Penthouses are located atop the wings as well.

=== Features ===
Upon its completion, the Equitable Building was the largest office building in the world by total area. The building had 1.2 million square feet (110,000 m^{2}) of floor space, and each of the upper stories has 30,000 square feet (2,800 m^{2}) due to the H-shaped footprints. A fact sheet published at the time of the Equitable Building's completion estimated that it had approximately 5,000 windows and 10,000 doors.

==== Structural features ====
The foundations descended to 85 feet (26 m) below ground level. The foundation is surrounded by a concrete cofferdam which measures 6 feet (1.8 m) wide and is reinforced by steel rods. Within the foundation are eighty piers, each of made of concrete and steel. A retaining wall between Cedar and Pine Streets reinforces two of the basement levels, surrounding vaults designed by Frederick S. Holmes. The superstructure weighs 32,500 short tons (29,000 long tons; 29,500 t). At the time of the Equitable Building's construction, it was described as the world's heaviest structure. There are 88 granite columns that rest on the piers within the foundation, and another 50 columns that rest atop the cofferdam.

==== Interior ====
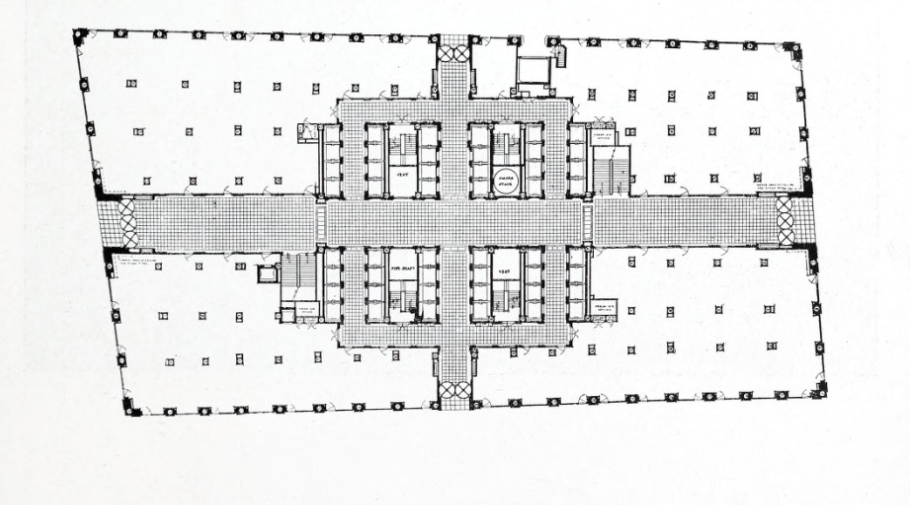
1st floor plan

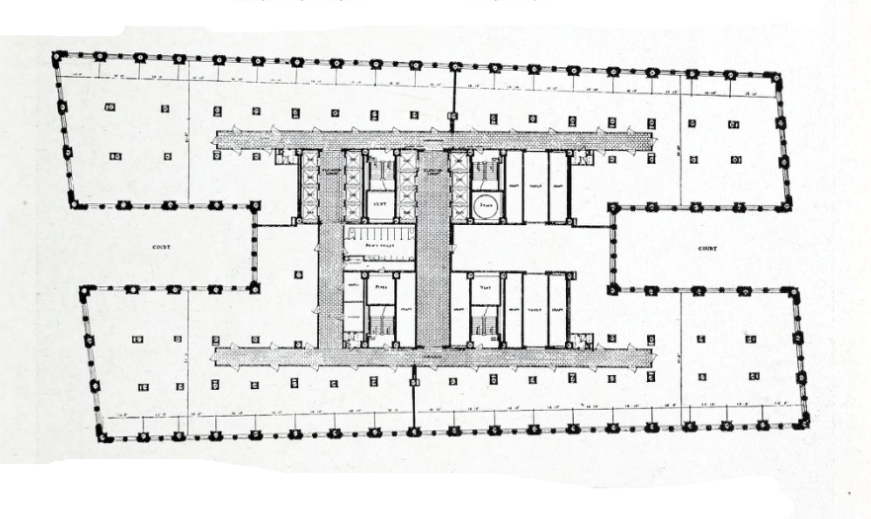
7th floor plan

The ground-floor lobby is composed of two perpendicular arcades, a west-east corridor from Broadway to Nassau Street and a north-south corridor from Pine to Cedar Streets. All four entrances contained bronze revolving doors. The lobby has a pink marble floor, sand-colored marble walls, and a vaulted, coffered ceiling. The corridors are 24 feet (7.3 m) wide, while the ceiling ranges from 20 feet (6.1 m) tall at the edges to 35 feet (11 m) tall at the center. The ceiling is designed in patterns of octagons and squares. Also in the lobby are the elevators, which contain marble-and-bronze doors and are located in the central section of the "H". Banking spaces and storefronts are also located on the ground floor, accessible from the lobby. To the southeast and northwest, marble stairs with balustrades lead to the basements and second floor.

In the basement, there are also connections to several New York City Subway stations, including Wall Street (served by the 4 and 5 trains), Wall Street (served by the 2 and 3 trains), and Broad Street (served by the J and Z trains). At opening, half of the basement was occupied by the Cafe Savarin, a 1,000-seat eatery with three rooms fitted with bright blue tiled walls and floors. On the upper floors, a staircase, restrooms, and utilities are clustered into the core of the "H". The light courts within the "H" ensured that all offices could receive natural light. West-east corridors ran perpendicularly to the elevator lobbies, crossing both wings of the "H". Floors were arranged so that they could be divided into suites facing outward, so that all suites faced windows, though it was also possible for lessees to rent entire floors. Upon the building's opening, Equitable also provided rest and recreation rooms for the building's 2,000 female employees, making it the first large building to have a women's welfare department. Also in the building was the library of the New York Law Institute, which remains in the building as of 2020.

The Equitable Building housed the 1,500-member Bankers Club on its top three floors when it opened. The club had five dining rooms, a lounge, reception rooms, and an open-air terrace. The club was highly frequented by notable financial figures and socialites in New York City, hosting politicians and leaders such as United Kingdom prime minister Winston Churchill, French president Charles de Gaulle, Soviet Union leader Nikita Khrushchev, and Queen of the United Kingdom Elizabeth II. It closed in 1979 after the club's lease expired.

==== Mechanical features ====
The operations of the Equitable Building were described as being akin to a small city. When the building opened, there was a power station 50 feet (15 m) below ground level. It contained seven boilers with a combined output of 3,500 horsepower (2,600 kW), which took up a space measuring 145 by 180 feet (44 by 55 m). There was also an artificial ice plant. The power station originally burned oil, consuming 2.5 million barrels per year, but started using coal in 1934 due to a rise in fuel prices. At the time of completion, the Equitable Building was said to have more telephones than did all of Greece.

The building contains 50 elevators; the 48 elevators serving the above ground levels are clustered in six groups of eight, while an additional two elevators serve the basements. The Equitable Building previously contained as many as 62 elevators.

== History ==
=== Context ===
During the 19th century, life insurance firms were some of the first companies to build high-profile skyscrapers. The Equitable Life Assurance Society of the United States, founded by Henry Baldwin Hyde in 1859, had built the Equitable Life Building on 120 Broadway in 1870. The Equitable Life Building was the first office building to feature passenger elevators, and at a record 130 feet (40 m) upon construction, was among the world's first skyscrapers. The building was expanded numerous times, including in 1875 and in 1887. Equitable assumed control of all properties on the block by 1906. By the 1890s, the Equitable Life Building was architecturally outdated, and George B. Post prepared plans for a 40-story structure in 1897, which did not proceed.

In 1907, Daniel H. Burnham's company had proposed replacing the Equitable Life Building with a 33-story structure. At the time, both Burnham and Equitable publicly denied that a new home office was being planned. Burnham's firm filed plans for a 62-story building in 1908, to top the Singer Building and Metropolitan Life Tower. This new building would have had a 34-story base and a 28-story tower, being 909 feet (277 m) tall, with 40 acres (160,000 m^{2}) of floor area and 3,600 offices. Although bidding for the proposed structure began in December 1908, Equitable president Paul Morton publicly denied plans for a new structure. The plan was ultimately dropped, possibly due to opposition over the building's sheer bulk.

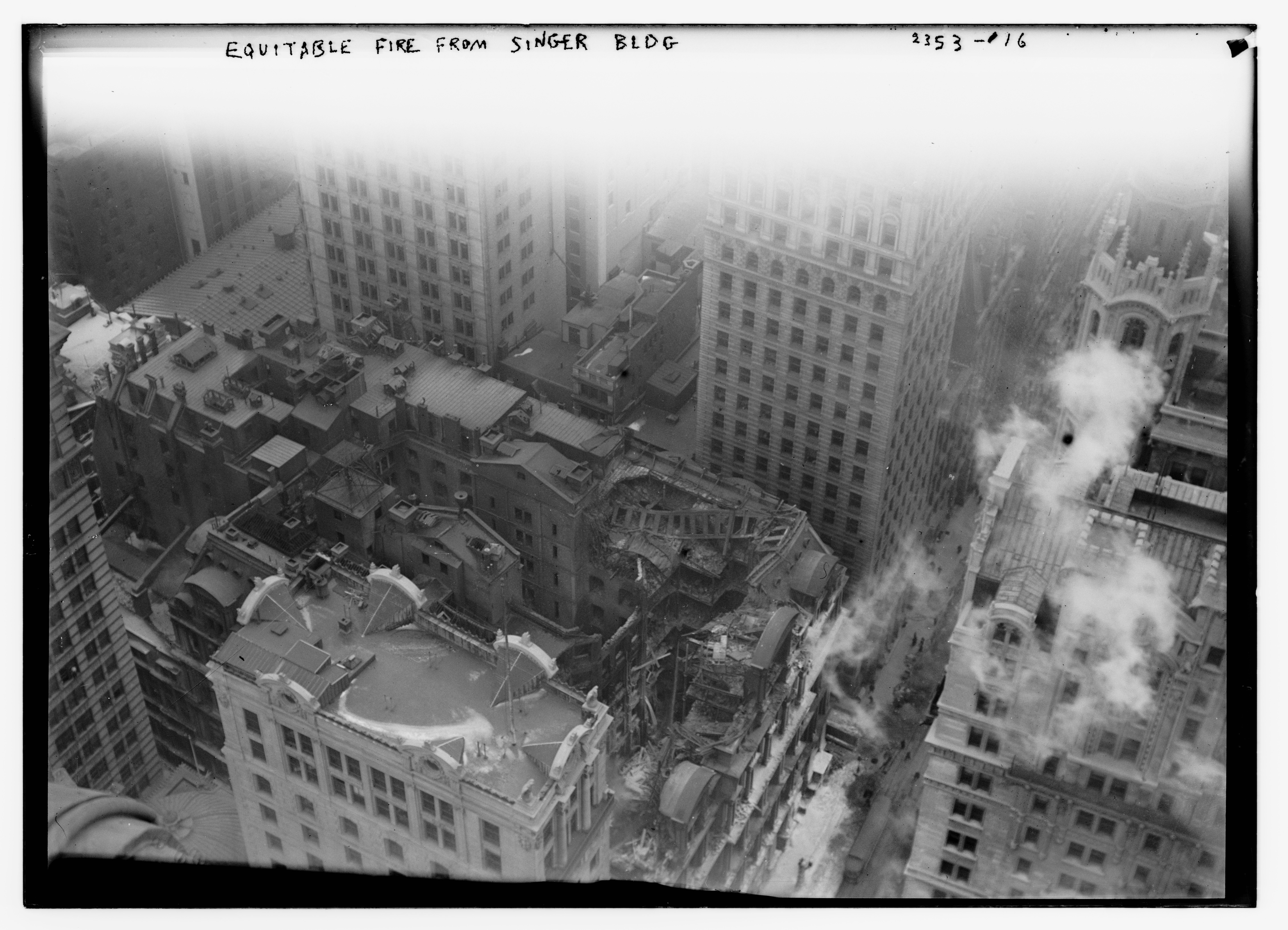
1912 fire

The Equitable Life Building was destroyed by a fire on January 9, 1912, which killed six people. Fire engines could not save the structure because the water from the engines had frozen in the cold weather. Equitable quickly set up temporary quarters at the City Investing Building. Given that the previous building had been worth very little, the land was actually worth more after the fire than beforehand.

=== Planning and construction ===
==== Planning ====
After the fire, Thompson–Starrett was hired to clear the site, and the plot was chosen as the location for Equitable's new headquarters building. Thompson–Starrett president Louis J. Horowitz approached businessman T. Coleman du Pont, who later recalled that du Pont was interested in the "idea of owning a gigantic building in New York". Frank M. Andrews—who also designed the Hotel McAlpin for du Pont—was involved in the project as well. Horowitz, Andrews, and du Pont were said to have bought the lot in August 1912, and finalized the sale that October for $13.5 million.

Du Pont forced Andrews from the project, apparently upon Horowitz's advice, and Andrews sued du Pont in July 1913, leading du Pont to pay Andrews $100,000 for his involvement. Horowitz then corresponded with Ernest Graham, the other major partner at D. H. Burnham & Company after Burnham's June 1912 death, who would become the architect of the new tower. Graham designed the structure as a bulky mass, wanting to maximize the amount of office space on the site rather than a corporate symbol. Graham's key concern was with the height of the elevators, and he discussed the issue with preeminent elevator engineer Charles E. Knox, who said that "the elevator service will determine the height of the building". This differed from Graham's previous commissions, where elevators were considered after the height of the building was specified. Knox ultimately recommended against building a 42-story structure, but recommended a 36-story edifice since that height could meet the client's safety and speed criteria.

Opposition to the building soon coalesced. One group of bankers planned to build a park on the site, a suggestion that Horowitz said "outranks, for nerve, anything of which I ever heard", and was dropped when Horowitz suggested that the group raise $13.5 million to buy out du Pont's ownership share. Another proposal called for dividing the lot in half by extending New Street, an existing north-south road, north to Cedar Street. This plan also failed, and blueprints were filed with the New York City Department of Buildings in December 1912, which called for a huge H-shaped edifice on the block. On April 12, 1913, du Pont formed the Equitable Office Building Corporation to take title to the building site, and gave Equitable a $20.5 million mortgage loan to run for 60 years. Equitable would lease three floors in exchange for 9% dividends in the building corporation, to be paid in perpetuity. Equitable president William A. Day was appointed as chairman of the board of the building corporation. Thompson–Starrett was hired as the builder and Horowitz became the "owner's representative".

==== Construction ====
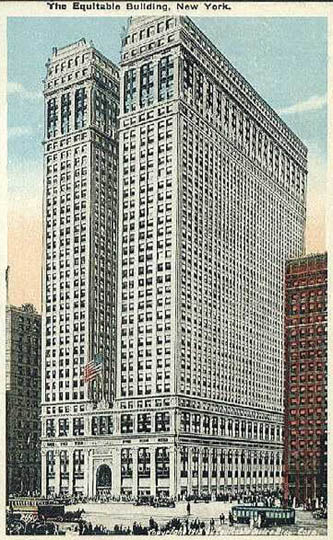
The Equitable Building in a postcard dated from before 1919

Because of the high land cost, the developers wanted to erect the building as quickly as possible; at the time, buildings' general contractors usually passed work down to subcontractors. To eliminate delays due to a lack of communication between subcontractors, the building corporation formed a "Method of Procedure" to coordinate all work on the building. Since there were no nearby material-storage areas, it was imperative that work be completed as quickly as possible. The start of work had already been held up by opposition to the proposed height and shape.

Excavation for the building started in June 1913. The cofferdam around the foundation was initially reinforced with timber cross-bracing until the steel frame underground had been sufficiently completed to support the cofferdam. During excavation, a cannonball from British colonial times was excavated from the site of the Equitable Building. By January 1914, crews had excavated the foundation and dug to the bedrock 83 feet (25 m) below street level. The steel work was built to the second floor using six derricks; the steel frame above that point was erected using lighter derricks with longer masts and booms. There were some accidents during construction, including two incidents in which workers were killed. One worker died after a crane fell on the Broadway side of the building, while another died when a crane dropped a girder onto a platform where six men were working.

The steel frame reached street level in February 1914. The cornerstone was officially laid on April 30, 1914, at a ceremony attended by mayor John Purroy Mitchel. The Equitable Building was the first private construction project in New York City where the mayor attended the cornerstone-laying ceremony. Work on the superstructure officially began on June 10, 1914. By August 16, the structure had topped out at 38 stories above the ground level. (Note: These 38 floors included the interior floors (not visible from the facade) but excluded the two-story penthouse.) Work on the building was completed on February 1, 1915.

=== Use ===
The Equitable Building was completed on May 1, 1915, at an estimated cost of $29 million, equivalent to $666,742,000 in 2025. The Equitable Society itself occupied 125,000 square feet (11,600 m^{2}), a little more than 10% of the total floor area, on the sixth through eighth floors. Other early lessees included tenants as diverse as General Electric, the Federal Reserve Bank of New York, the Fidelity Trust Company, and American Smelting & Refining. The Equitable Building was also occupied by industrial concerns such as the American Can Company, Kennecott Copper Company, E. I. du Pont de Nemours, Goodyear Tire and Rubber Company, and Aluminum Company of America, as well as railroads such as Missouri Pacific Railroad, Union Pacific Railroad, and Southern Railway. The Equitable Building's other tenants included banks such as Barclays, Marine Midland Bank, and Mellon Bank; financial firms such as Kidder, Peabody & Co. and American Express; and the offices of New York attorney general Robert Abrams. Equitable Life itself only had its home office in the Equitable Building until 1924, when it moved to 393 Seventh Avenue (now 11 Penn Plaza).

==== 1910s through 1930s ====
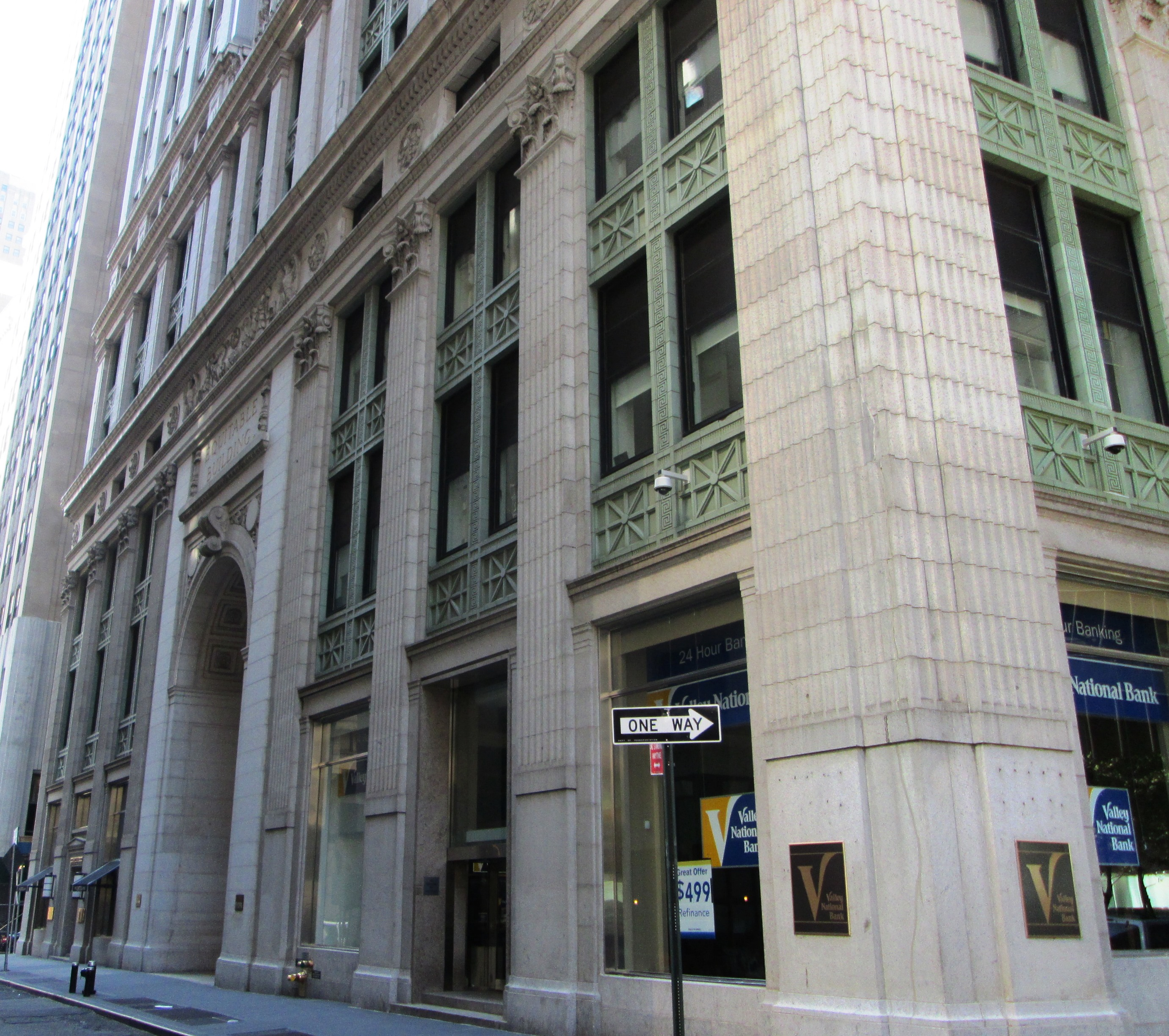
Seen from Cedar and Nassau Streets

At the time of its completion, the Equitable Building had 20,000 employees working inside it, and 50,000 additional daily visitors. Shortly after the official opening, du Pont bought the Equitable Life Assurance Company's controlling interest. During the first year of operation, du Pont made $3 million in profit. By 1917, the building was fully occupied at an average rental rate of $2.25 per square foot ($24.2/m^{2}). The building's valuation was increased from $20.5 million to $25 million that year, because of a prosperous realty market at the time. The following year, the Equitable Office Building Corporation applied for a reduction in the building's valuation from $25 million to $18 million, due to foreclosures on other large buildings in New York City. Further devaluation occurred in 1921, when the building was estimated to be worth $11.5 million, but by the next year, the building was re-valued at $30 million, making it among the city's most valuable properties.

The edifice was first placed for sale in 1923, with du Pont offering the building for $40 million. In 1925, du Pont sold the Equitable Building for $38.5 million to the New York Empire Company, a subsidiary of the Brotherhood of Locomotive Engineers and Trainmen. The next year, the Brotherhood sold the building to a syndicate composed of William Henry Vanderbilt, Harry C. Cushing III, and Leroy W. Baldwin for $40 million. By 1928, the Equitable Building was assessed at $31 million, making it the highest-valued building in New York City.

==== 1940s through 1960s ====
By the 1940s, the Equitable Office Building Corporation was in poor financial shape. Bankruptcy proceedings started in 1940, but were delayed due to World War II; three potential investors submitted dueling proposals in 1946. The building was refinanced in 1947, receiving a first-mortgage loan of $14.5 million, among the largest ever in New York City's history. At this time, Equitable Life sold the mortgage on the tower.

In 1954, Webb and Knapp bought all of the Equitable Office Building Corporation's common stock, and thereby acquired ownership of the building. Lawrence Wien bought the lease for the land in 1956, though Webb and Knapp retained ownership of the building as well as its operating sublease. By then, Equitable was planning to build the new 1285 Avenue of the Americas on Sixth Avenue between 51st and 52nd streets in Midtown Manhattan. Two years later, the Equitable Life Assurance Company bought the building outright, as part of a $25 million exchange wherein Webb and Knapp bought the Sixth Avenue plot. In addition, Wien assumed the building's operating sublease the same year. Equitable moved to 1285 Avenue of the Americas in 1961 from its previous home office at 393 Seventh Avenue.

==== 1970s to present ====
Silverstein Properties purchased the Equitable Building in 1980 for $60 million, in partnership with five pension funds whose mortgage nearly covered the purchase price. After buying the building, Larry Silverstein renovated and restored it at a cost of $30 million, to a design by Ehrenkrantz, Eckstut & Whitelaw. The project entailed replacing the terracotta ornamentation, as well as the original terracotta frames for the windows, which was replaced with glass-fiber reinforced plastic. The window sash and main entrances were also replaced, and the lobby was refurbished. The renovation was completed in 1990. As a result of the project, occupancy rates increased from 60% in 1991 to 80% in 1993. Following the early 1990s recession, Silverstein sold his ownership stake and leased the Equitable Building, though Silverstein Properties bought it back in 1999.

In 2017, Silverstein announced another round of renovations, which cost $50 million and were undertaken by Beyer Blinder Belle. The plan included restoring many historic features including the glass mosaic at the front entrance, the chandeliers in the lobby, and reopening the Bankers Club at the top of the building as an amenity space. The renovation also created twin rooftop terraces spanning a combined 5,500 square feet (510 m^{2}). The renovation was completed in July 2019. Several murals resembling street art were installed on the third floor in November 2019. Tenants as of 2026 include the New York City Department of City Planning, Macmillan Publishers, architecture firm Beyer Blinder Belle, the Securities Industry and Financial Markets Association, the New York City Housing Development Corporation, Tower Research Capital, and the Heisman Trophy offices.

== Notable incidents ==
There were numerous incidents where parts of the building were damaged. For instance, lightning caused part of the cornice to break off during 1925. In March 1942, a seven-inch (17 cm) shell struck the 37th floor of the building but caused little damage and no injuries. The shell was one of eight fired by an anti-aircraft battery near the East River by mistake; the other rounds fell harmlessly into the river. The 1942 incident made the Equitable Building the first in New York City to suffer war damage during World War II, and it subsequently took out an insurance policy. In February 1953, a broken water main flooded the basements with 2 million US gallons (7,600,000 L) of water, temporarily disabling the elevators.

Throughout the Equitable Building's history, several people have died after they fell or jumped from the building. In the building's early years, such incidents included a clerk who landed on a taxi in 1925; a woman who jumped from the roof after losing money in the Wall Street Crash of 1929; a broker who jumped in 1937; and an incident in 1930 where a jumper killed both himself and a truck driver on the ground. There were also several people who killed themselves inside the building, such as the shooting suicide of a politician in 1933 and another one in 1937.

== Impact ==
=== Reception ===
Many architectural critics had negative comments about the Equitable Building. Francisco Mujica stated in 1927 that "its intelligent interior arrangement and the central location of its 50 elevators" was the only appealing part of the Equitable Building. Another critic called it a "monstrous parasite on the veins and arteries of New York". Sally A. Kitt Chappell wrote that the Equitable Building "was tall but without the redeeming slender, spirelike quality of a tower, and yet its height prevented it from having the urbanistic decorum of an office block". However, Chappell also wrote that the building had "mitigate[d] two of the major evils of which skyscrapers were accused, as its fireproofing and elevator service attest."

There was also significant resistance to the building's shape. Opponents stated that the building also overwhelmed nearby infrastructure by blocking ventilation, straining nearby transit facilities, and preventing firemen from easily reaching the upper floors. The shadow was more than six times the lot area and up to 0.2 miles (320 m) long. One journal stated that the Equitable Building cast a 7-acre (28,000 m^{2}) shadow on its surroundings, including a permanent shadow on the Singer Building up to its 27th floor and the City Investing Building up to its 24th floor, and completely cutting off sunshine to at least three other adjacent buildings shorter than 21 stories. Even during the cornerstone laying, Mayor Mitchel had alluded to the possibility that the Equitable Building might be the last bulky skyscraper to be erected in New York City.

=== Landmark designations ===
The building was designated a National Historic Landmark in 1978, albeit for Equitable Life's role in American commerce, not for the building's architectural or engineering significance. The New York City Landmarks Preservation Commission designated the Equitable Building a New York City landmark in 1996. Silverstein supported the city designation, and the commission wrote in its report that the Equitable Building was "one of the finest office buildings of the era". In 2007, it was designated as a contributing property to the Wall Street Historic District, a NRHP district.

=== Zoning law ===
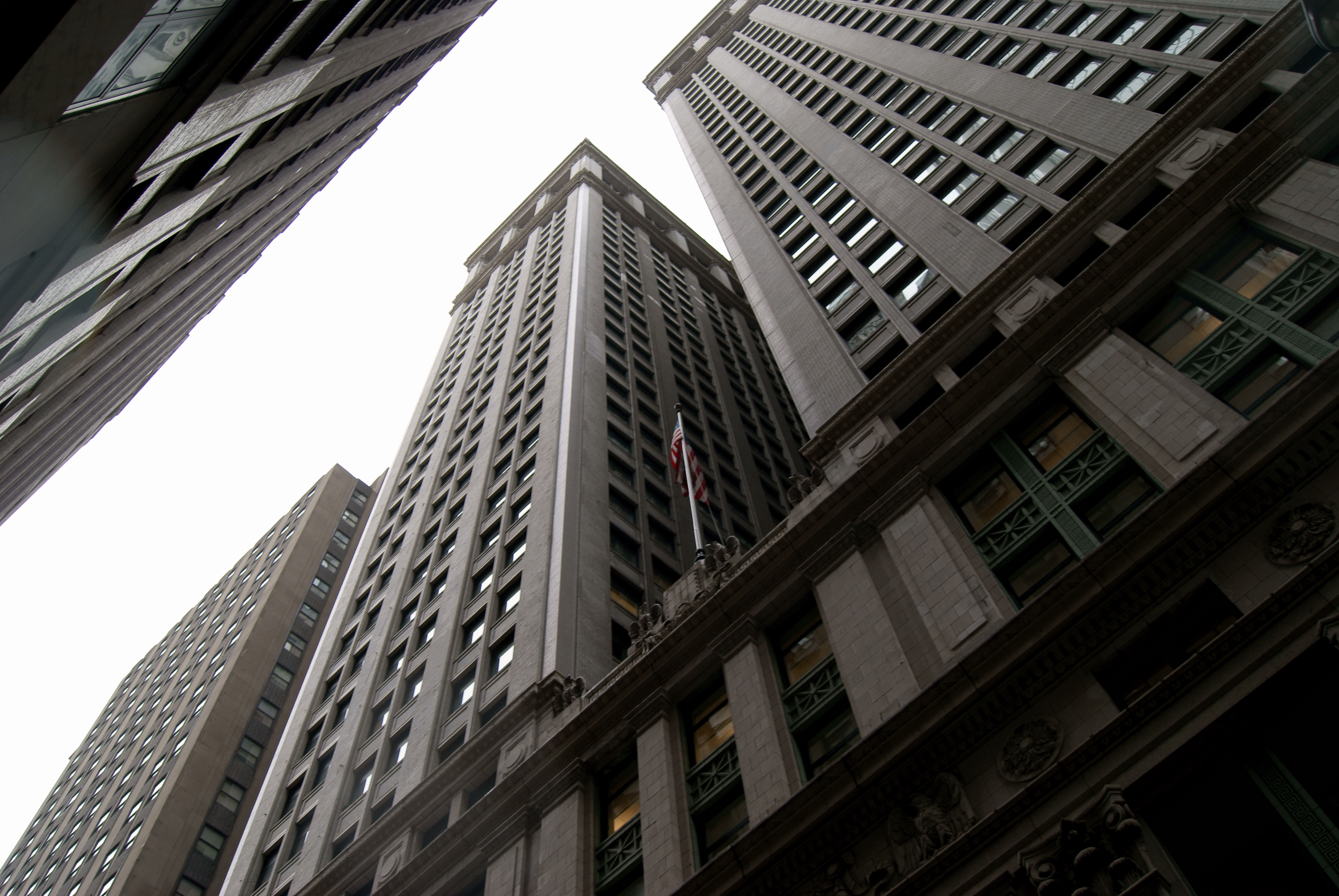
The Equitable Building in 2011, showing the effect of pre-zoning skyscrapers when seen from the sidewalk

The Equitable Building's construction was one of the influences behind the passage of zoning reform in New York City. The AIA Guide to New York City described the building as "more famous for what it caused than what it is", although the Equitable Building was only one of the several catalysts of such reform.

Opposition to super-tall buildings dated as far back as 1894. Early attempts by Ernest Flagg to limit the height of New York's skyscrapers in 1896 failed; further unsuccessful attempts followed between 1906 and 1908, and legislation was turned down again in 1909, partially because of pressure from the real estate industry. After 1913, however, the city's property market entered a recession, and vacancy levels in buildings began to rise. The Committee on Congestion of Population in New York, (Note: Created in 1907 by a group of citizens that included Benjamin C. Marsh) as well as the Fifth Avenue Association, were among the groups that advocated for such legislation to limit building heights. The New York City Board of Aldermen's Building Commission had published preliminary reports for zoning controls in 1913, when the Equitable Building was barely under construction. Nevertheless, in the following years, opponents of super-tall skyscrapers frequently cited the Equitable Building's bulk.

After the Equitable Building's completion, numerous nearby property owners filed for reduced property valuation assessments on the basis that significant rental income had been taken by the shadow that the building cast. Following the public criticism of the Equitable Building, the real estate industry finally ceased its objections to new legislation, and the 1916 Zoning Resolution was passed. The legislation limited the height and required setbacks for new buildings to allow the penetration of sunlight to street level. New buildings were thus required to withdraw progressively at a defined angle from the street as they rose, in order to preserve sunlight and the open atmosphere in their surroundings. Chappell writes that if the Equitable Building had been completed after the resolution's passage, it would have had two setbacks below the 18th floor, and the building above that point would have been a small tower. The effort to place restrictions on land use in New York City led to the Standard State Zoning Enabling Act, a nationwide zoning legislation. The subsequent 1961 Zoning Resolution allowed the construction of bulky towers if they contained plazas.

== See also ==
- Early skyscrapers
- List of National Historic Landmarks in New York City
- List of New York City Designated Landmarks in Manhattan below 14th Street
- National Register of Historic Places listings in Manhattan below 14th Street

Preceded by Manhattan Municipal Building	Largest office building in the world by floor area 1915–1928	Succeeded by Merchandise Mart
