= Sugar House Prison =

Sugar House Prison may refer to:

- Sugar house prisons (New York) (1776–1783), used by British forces to detain prisoners of war during the American Revolution.
- Sugar House Prison (Utah) (1855–1951), first built as a territorial penitentiary; it is now a large, jointly owned municipal park, owned and administered by Salt Lake City and Salt Lake County, Utah.
