= Deborah Morris =

Deborah Morris may refer to:

- Deborah Morris-Travers, New Zealand politician
- Deborah Morris (politician), Australian politician
- Deborah Morris and John Franklin, colonial patriots who assisted prisoners of war during the American Revolutionary War
