= Charles Franklin (disambiguation) =

Charles Franklin (1880–1932) was an Irish motorcycle racer and engineer.

Charles Franklin may also refer to:

- Charles Samuel Franklin (1879–1964), British radio pioneer
- Charles Franklin (writer) (1909–1976), British author of mystery novels and spy novels
- Charles D. Franklin (1931–1992), U.S. Army officer
- Albert Franklin Banta (1843–1924), American newspaperman, politician, jurist, and army scout also known as Charles A. Franklin

== See also ==
- Charles Franklyn (1896–1982), doctor
