= Benjamin Marsh (disambiguation) =

Benjamin Marsh (1687–c. 1775) was one of the founders of Sutton, Massachusetts.

Benjamin Marsh may also refer to:

- Benjamin F. Marsh (1835–1905), American politician
- Benjamin C. Marsh (1878–1952), pioneer of American city planning
- Benjamin R. Marsh, Jr. (1916–1941), United States Navy officer
- Ben Marsh (born 1976), Australian-rules football player
