= Frank Lester =

Frank Lester may refer to:

- Frank Lester (VC) (1896–1918), English soldier and recipient of the Victoria Cross
- Frank Lester (fighter) (born 1984), American mixed martial artist
- Frank Lester (footballer) (1870–?), English footballer for Birmingham City F.C.
- Frank Lester, alternative pen-name of author Charles Franklin
