= Benjamin Franklin School =

Benjamin Franklin School may refer to:

in the United States

(by state then city)

- Benjamin Franklin Public School Number 36, Indianapolis, Indiana, listed on the National Register of Historic Places (NRHP) in Center Township, Marion County
- Benjamin Franklin High School (New Orleans, Louisiana)
- Benjamin Franklin Academics Plus School, Philadelphia Pennsylvania, listed on the NRHP in Northeast Philadelphia
- Benjamin Franklin High School (Philadelphia), Pennsylvania
- Benjamin Franklin School, a middle school in Uniontown Area School District, Pennsylvania

== See also ==
- List of places named for Benjamin Franklin § Schools
- Ben Franklin Academy, Atlanta, Georgia
- Franklin Learning Center, Philadelphia, Pennsylvania
- Franklin School (disambiguation)
- Franklin High School (disambiguation)
