= Trinity and United States Realty Buildings =

Buildings in Manhattan, New York

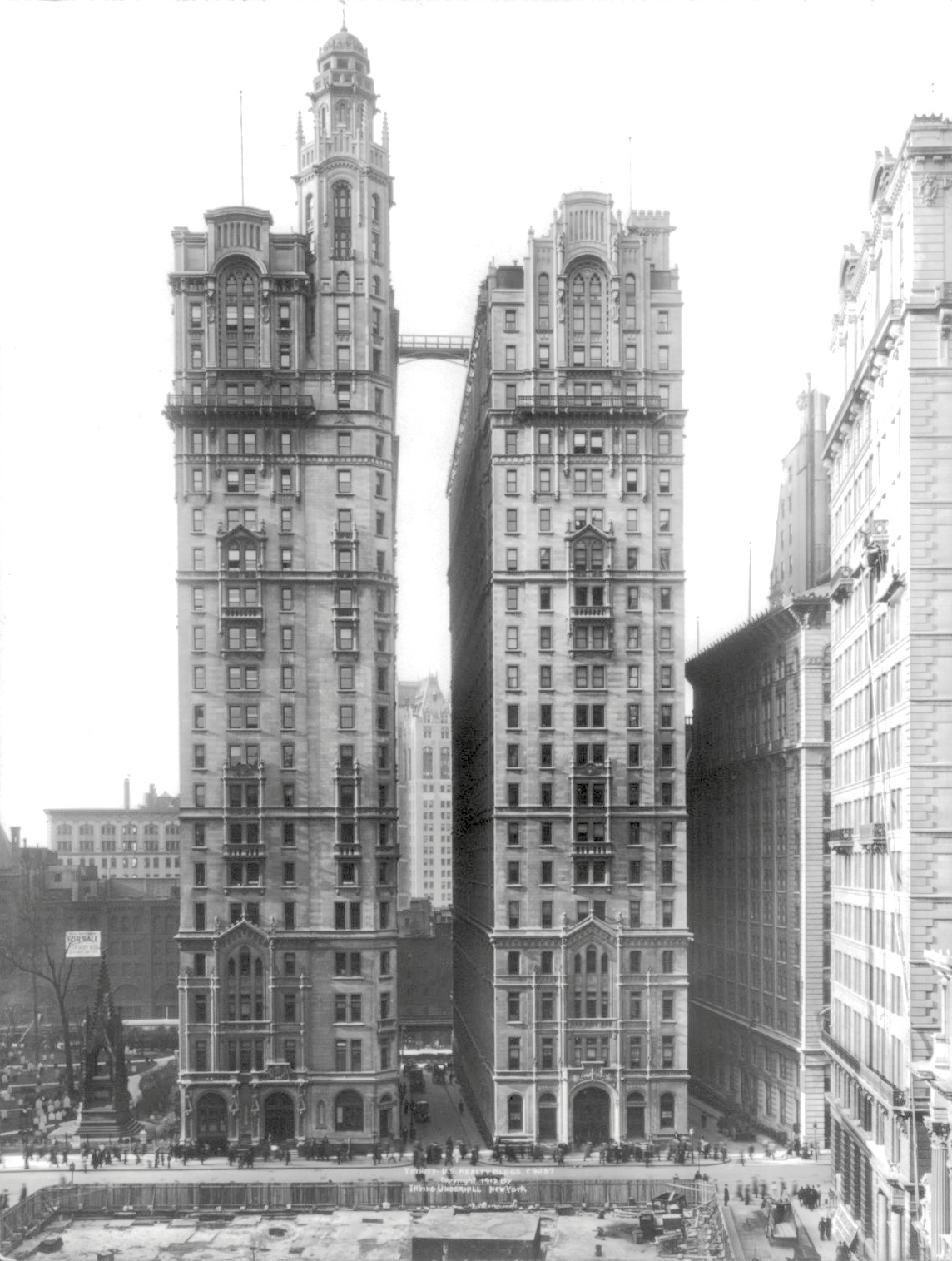
- The Trinity Building is at left in this 1912 westward view.
- Interactive map of Trinity and United States Realty Buildings
- Location: Manhattan, New York
- Coordinates: 40.7088°N 74.0115°W
- Built: 1905 and 1907
- Architect: Francis H. Kimball
- Architectural style: Neo-Gothic

New York City Landmark
- Designated: June 7, 1988
- Reference no.: 1557, 1558

The Trinity Building, designed by Francis H. Kimball and built in 1905, with an addition of 1907, and Kimball's United States Realty Building of 1907, located respectively at 111 and 115 Broadway in Manhattan's Financial District, are among the first Gothic-inspired skyscrapers in New York, and both are New York City designated landmarks. The Trinity Building, adjacent to the churchyard of Richard Upjohn's neo-Gothic Trinity Church, replaced an 1853 Upjohn structure of the same name. Earlier, the Van Cortlandt sugar house stood on the west end of the plot – a notorious British prison where American soldiers were held during the Revolutionary War.

== History ==
=== Trinity Building of 1853 ===
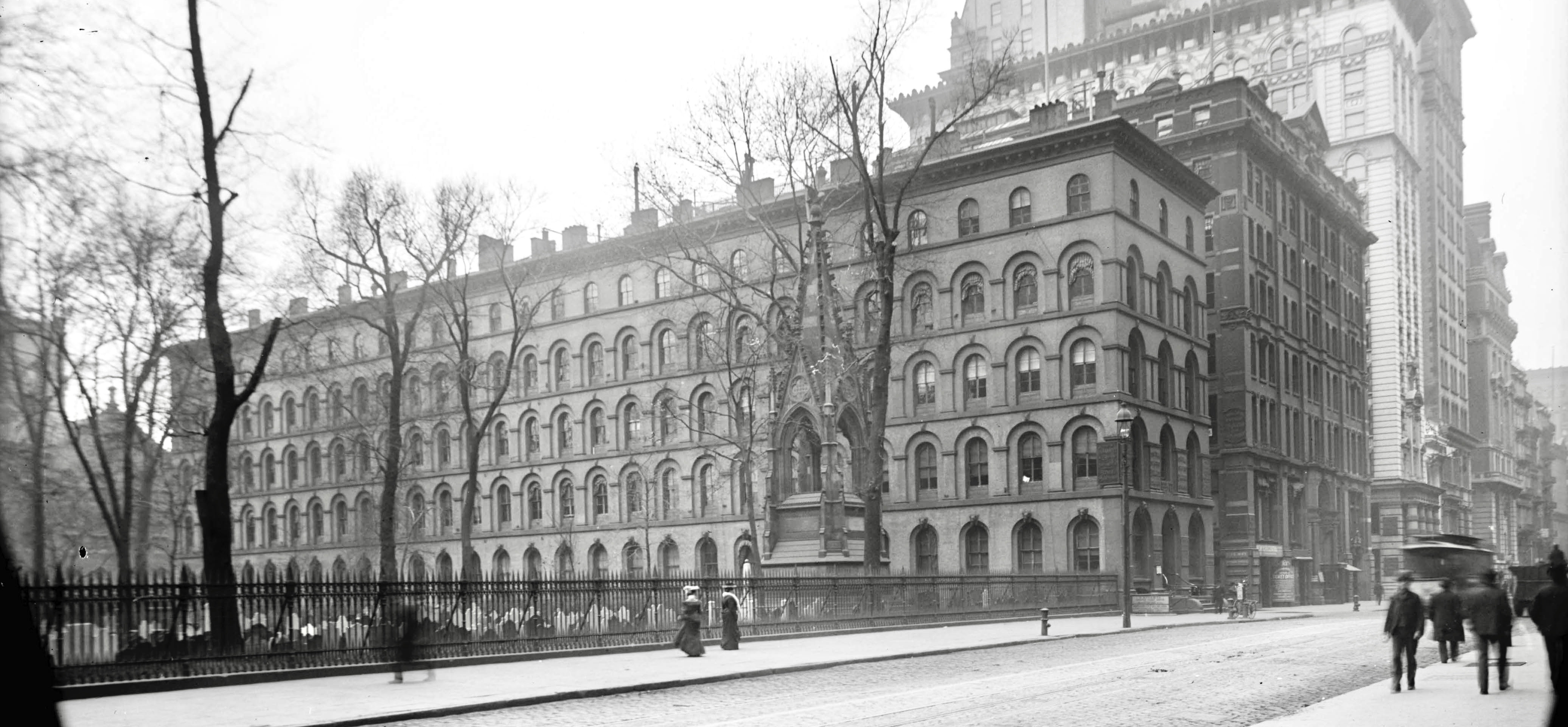
The Trinity Building of 1853 (long building) and the Boreel Building (to its right) in 1902. The buildings to their right have been replaced by Zucotti Park.

The Van Cortlandt sugar house, on the southeast corner of Thames Street and Trinity Place, adjoining Trinity Churchyard, was demolished in 1852.

The sugar house occupied the western end of a narrow strip of land bordering the churchyard, measuring 40 feet on Broadway, 46 feet on Trinity Place, 259 feet along the graveyard, and 263 feet on Thames Street. Also demolished that year was the New England Hotel at 111 Broadway, at the eastern end of the strip. It was a frame structure, said to be favored by the clerks and traveling salesmen in the dry goods trade, which centered in that neighborhood at the time. A dry goods merchant, H.B. Claflin, together with associates, replaced the sugar house and hotel with a new building, huge for its time, occupying the entire strip: five neo-Romanesque stories of yellowish brick with terracotta trim, except the basement, which was cut brownstone. The basement was below Broadway but above Trinity Place, owing to the land slope, and was completely given over to the dry goods store of Claflin, Mellin & Company. Its entrance was near Trinity Place in Thames Street, but the other floors were entered from Broadway. "Besides the stairwell there [was] an ample well-hole from top to bottom, which answer[ed] both for the purpose of ventilation and of light." Although the new building had no tie with the church, they called it Trinity Building.

By the end of May 1853, nearly all the space was let, despite high rentals. The top floor was occupied by Toppan, Carpenter, Casilear & Company, the engravers, as a workshop. Tappan & Company, a mercantile agency, had a single-room office that took up half the second floor. The rest of the building was divided into small offices. The store moved away in 1861.

Richard Upjohn moved his office into the building and in 1857 was one of the founders of the American Institute of Architects, which was established there. From 1892 the New York Real Estate Salesrooms had quarters in the basement of the Trinity Building. In its room all the court and the majority of other auction sales in that time were held. The real estate business of Peter F. Meyer & Co. – Richard Croker and Peter F. Meyer – had offices in the building almost continuously for 43 years. Many prominent lawyers had offices there, too. When the building was finally emptied on April 30, 1903, a list of individuals and firms was published with their new addresses; it comprised more than 130 names, mostly lawyers and real estate businesses.

=== United States Realty and Construction Company ===
In 1901 Harry S. Black, who had just taken over the George A. Fuller Company from his late father-in-law, established the United States Realty and Construction Company, a powerhouse development organization with some of the biggest names in New York real estate, including Robert Dowling, Henry Morgenthau, Cornelius Vanderbilt and Charles F. Hoffman. It then acquired a large percentage of the George A. Fuller Company (general contractor for these commissions), and the well-established New York Realty Corporation, among other holdings. The corporation was formed to combine three functions: to purchase real estate for investment and sale, to erect buildings through the George A. Fuller Company, and to raise capital to do both.

Moving Thames Street

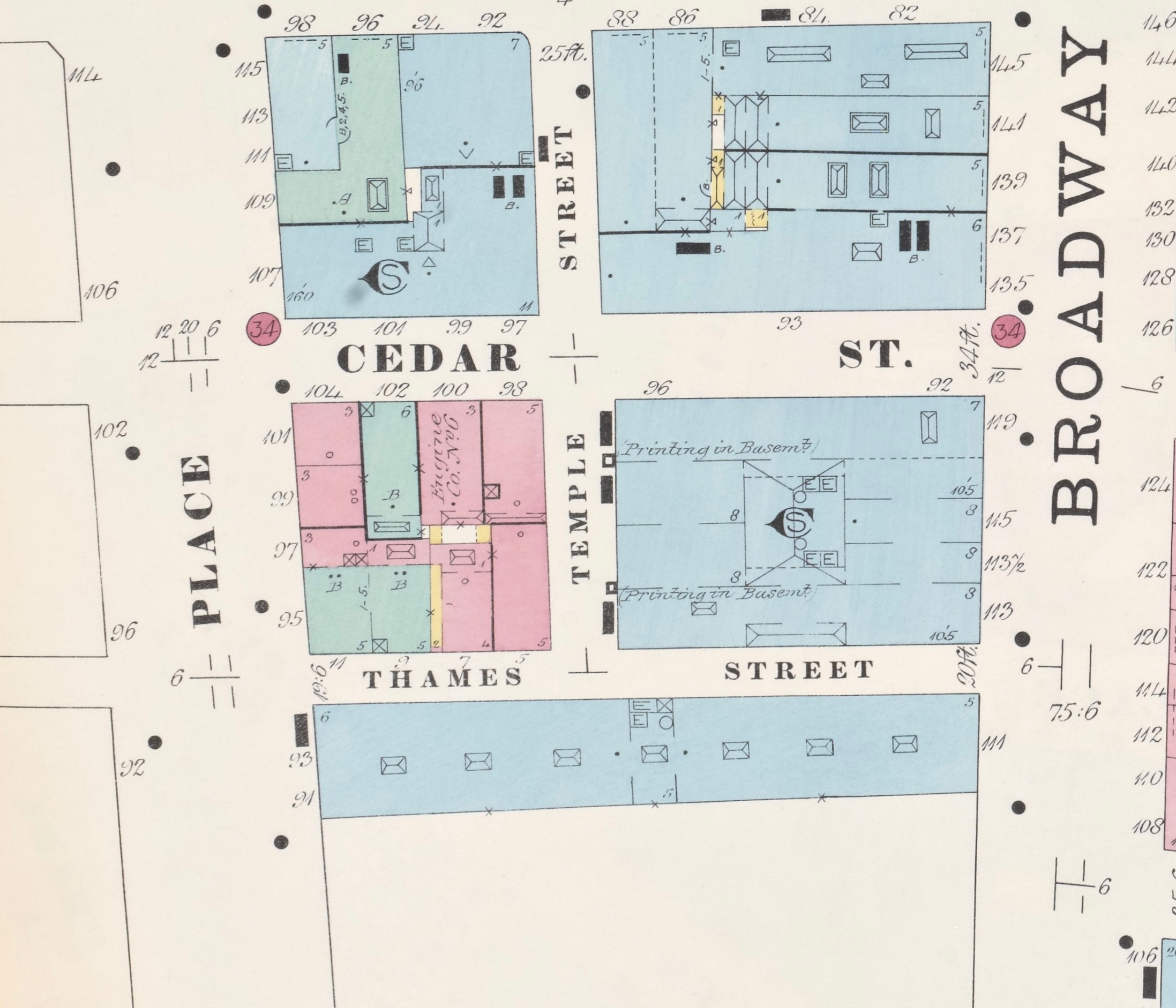
Map published in 1894 shows the site of Richard Upjohn's 1853 Trinity Building. Trinity Place parallels Broadway on the left, and Cedar Street and Liberty Street (top) parallel Thames Street.

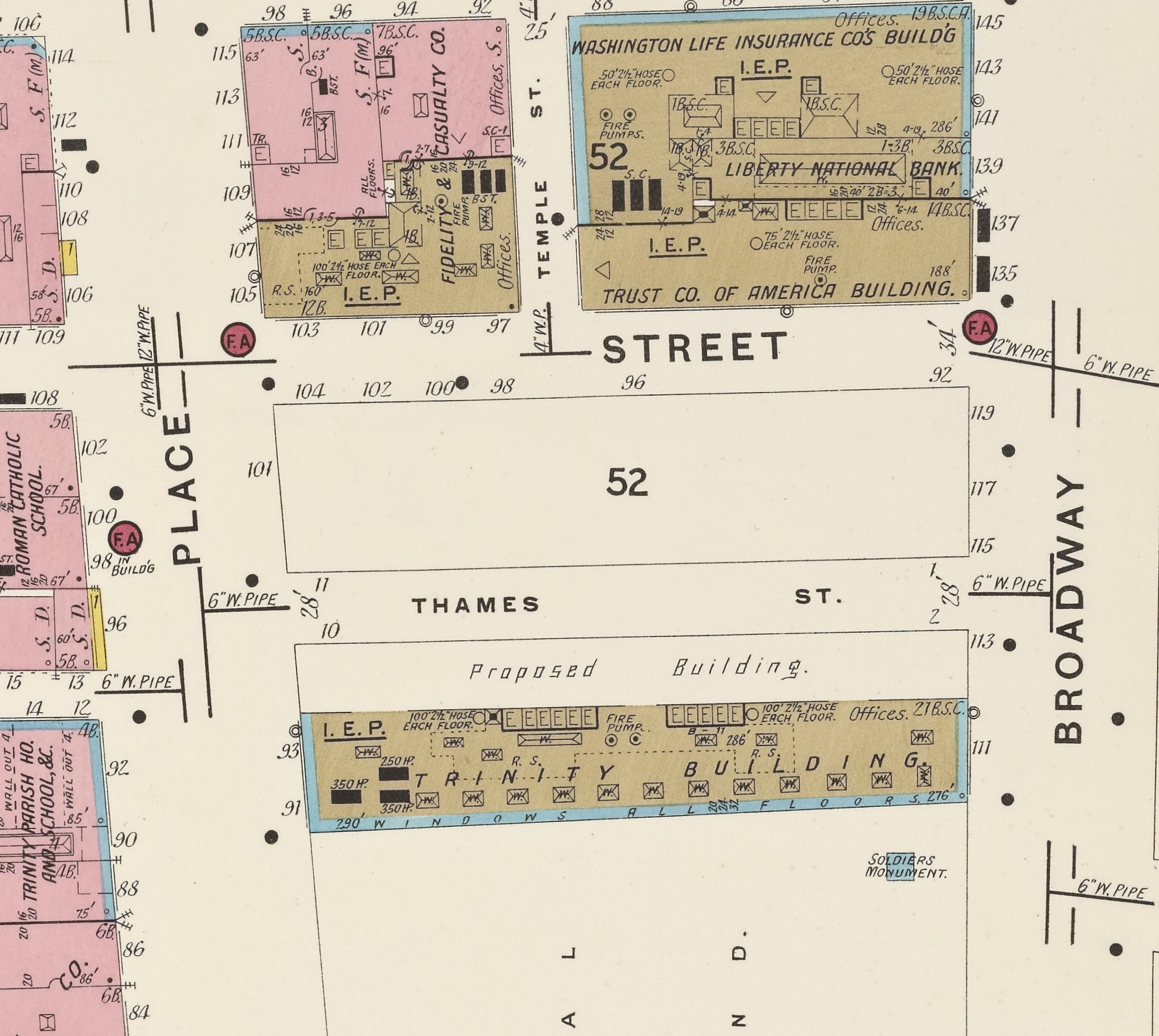
Map published in 1905 shows Kimball's Trinity Building of the same year occupying the same site. It was enlarged in 1907 ("Proposed Building") as the U.S. Realty Building was completed across Thames Street.

For its first large project, it bought the old Trinity Building. The Trinity and U.S. Realty Buildings were originally conceived as freestanding office buildings to be erected simultaneously. But acquisition delays held that project up, and U. S. Realty went ahead with a 21-story building on the site of the Trinity Building itself, 40 feet wide and 290 feet high. The north wall of the Trinity Building was left in utilitarian brick, so the building could be expanded They were actually built two years apart and not as identical structures. To attain maximum exposure to light for both skyscrapers with a minimum of interior offices, it was planned that the buildings would be erected on equal, full-block sites. To secure equal sites, however, municipal consent was needed to move the existing Thames Street approximately twenty-eight feet to the north, and to permanently close the south half of two-block-long Temple Street, which originally ran between Thames and Liberty Streets, bisecting the site of the U.S. Realty Building. The city granted these changes, with the condition that Thames Street be widened from twenty-five to thirty feet.

=== Construction ===
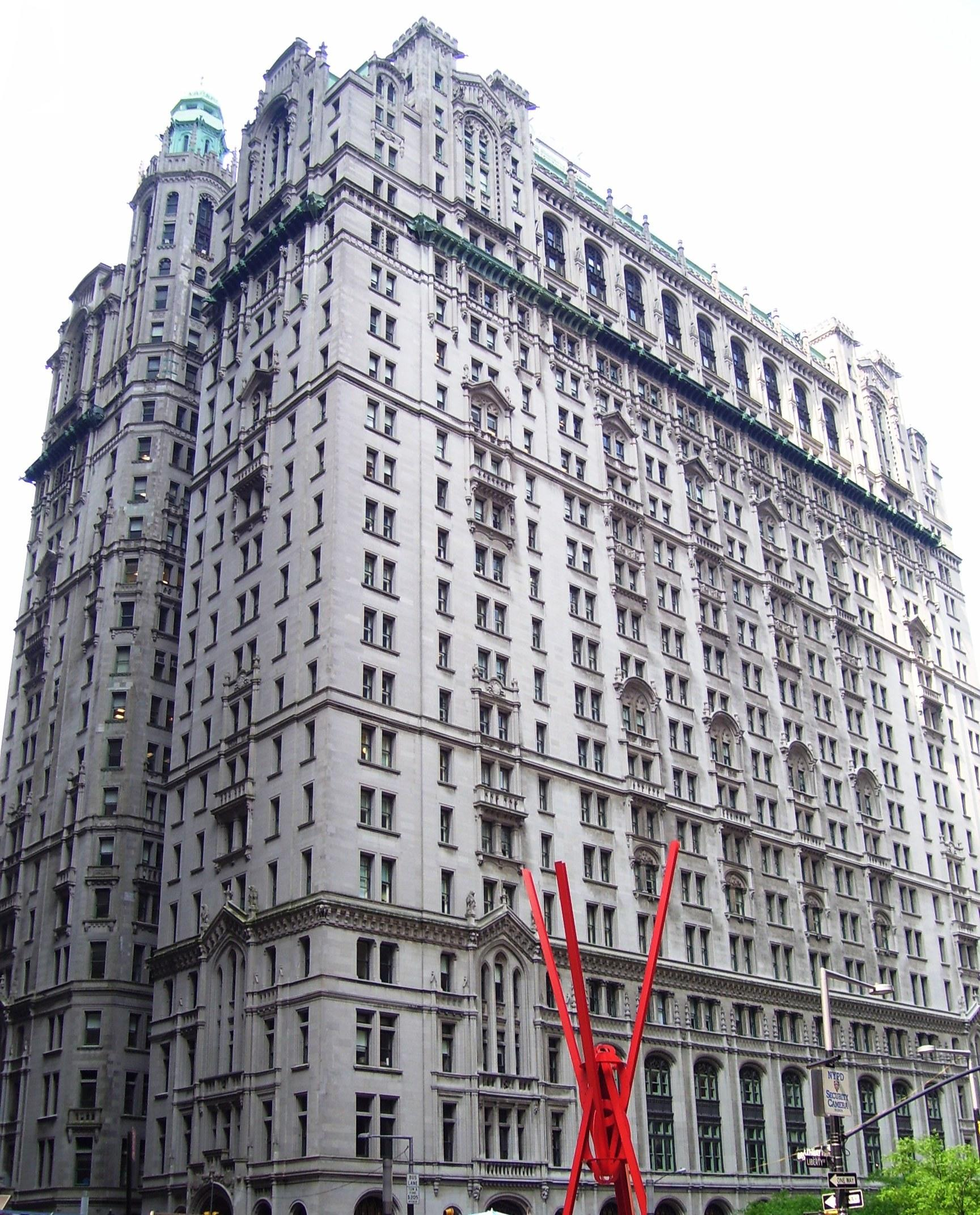
Trinity and United States Realty Buildings in 2011

The buildings' architect, Francis H. Kimball, had developed a technique in the 1891–92 iron-and-steel-framed Fifth Avenue Theatre for constructing foundations with concrete cylinders sunk by mechanical means, that was a precursor of the later pneumatic caisson system of skyscraper foundation construction. The seminal 1893–94 17-story Manhattan Life Insurance Building, by Kimball and his partner at the time, George Kramer Thompson, is credited with being the first skyscraper with a full iron and steel frame, set on pneumatic concrete caissons (although the front masonry wall was load-bearing).

The foundations of the 1905 Trinity Building, installed in early 1904, consist of 50 caissons, 32 of wood and 18 of steel. These caissons were sunk through quicksand to bedrock, an average depth of 80 feet below the curb, and may have been the deepest foundations ever put down in New York to that time. The caissons and columns forming the north wall were designed in anticipation of the extension, in order to obviate the construction of a new line of caissons for it. Connections were made with those columns in 1906, and seventeen additional caissons were sunk.

The foundations for the U.S. Realty Building consist of 70 pneumatic caissons. Bedrock below U.S. Realty was reached at 75 feet. This foundation and the extension of Trinity were commenced in June 1906 and practically finished in August – 60 days – an unparalleled achievement. On average, 500 men were employed. Erection of steel began on October 26, 1906, and finished on January 28, 1907. Stone-setting began November 23, 1906 and was completed, despite severe weather, April 18. Not only did these two buildings set world records for rapidity of construction, but they were also considered to be the costliest business structures ever, together totaling $15 million, including land.

=== Later history ===
For decades after 1907, of the four large facades only one was visible from a distance of more than 34 feet: the south side of the Trinity Building, lining the open churchyard. The north side of 34-foot-wide Cedar Street was occupied by buildings to the property line (see "Moving Thames Street" maps). In the early 1970s, however, those buildings were demolished and replaced by Zuccotti Park (then called Liberty Plaza Park), making 115 Broadway as visually prominent as 111.

Both buildings were designated as landmarks by the New York City Landmarks Preservation Commission on June 7, 1988. The interior lobby spaces were renovated beginning in 1987 by Swanke Hayden Connell Architects. In addition, all the exteriors have been cleaned as well. In 2017 an application was made to the city's Department of Transportation to turn Thames Street into a pedestrian plaza.

== Architecture ==
The commission for the design of both was given to Francis H. Kimball, a devoted and prolific Gothic Revivalist who was an early advocate of Neo-Gothic style for office buildings. These are among the first Gothic-inspired skyscrapers in New York. Here the style establishes a sympathetic relationship between the skyscraper and its early Gothic Revival neighbor, Trinity Church and Churchyard.

Both buildings are long, narrow 20-story slabs with no setbacks. Their footprints are slightly irregular and not identical. Trinity's dimensions are roughly 69 feet on Broadway, 74 feet on Trinity Place, 260 feet along the churchyard, and 264 feet along Thames Street. U.S. Realty's dimensions are 61 feet on Broadway, 270 feet on Thames Street, and 275 feet on Cedar Street. The basements are below Broadway but above Trinity Place as the site slopes downward 11 feet. U.S. Realty's basement extends under the Broadway sidewalk to the curb line. There is also a stairway outside the building line to a basement retail space. The basements and first floors are given mostly to retail. The southern elevation is on grade with the elevated churchyard.

Both buildings have a direct connection to the Wall Street station of the New York City Subway's IRT Lexington Avenue Line. A subway entrance from the street is built into Trinity's Broadway facade.

The basements are clad in granite, and above them the curtain wall is Indiana limestone richly ornamented with a wide variety of gargoyles. The facades have a tripartite form: four-story base, 13-story shaft, and four-story capital. The Broadway elevations of the 1905 building and U.S. Realty are each symmetrical and identical in design except the former is narrower. With the addition of the 1907 extension, the Trinity facade became asymmetrical.

In 1912, a copper-clad addition was erected on a portion of the roof of the U.S. Realty Building as a second story for the new Lawyers Club. The same year, a footbridge was added over Thames Street connecting the roofs. Designed by Kimball, the bridge has steel framing and ornamental wrought iron panels with a quatrefoil pattern.
