= Franklin (class) =

English feudal social class

In the Kingdom of England from the 12th to 15th centuries, a franklin was a member of a certain social class or rank. In the Middle English period, a franklin was simply a freeman; that is, a man who was not a serf. In the feudal system under which people were tied to land which they did not own (or "own directly", etc.), serfs were in bondage to a member of the nobility who owned that land. The surname "Fry", derived from the Old English "frig" ("free born"), indicates a similar social origin.

The meaning of the word "franklin" evolved to mean a freeholder; that is, one who holds title to real property in fee simple. In the 14th and 15th centuries, franklin was "the designation of a class of landowners ranking next below the landed gentry".

With the definite end of feudalism, this social class disappeared as a distinct entity. The legal provisions for "a free man" were applied to the general population. The memory of that class was preserved in the use of "Franklin" as a surname.

== Etymology ==
According to the Oxford English Dictionary, the term "franklin" is derived from Middle English: franklen, frankeleyn, francoleyn, from Anglo-Latin francalanus a person owning francalia, "territory held without dues". Collins mentions the Anglo-French fraunclein, "a landowner of free, but not noble birth", from Old French franc free + -lein, "-ling", formed on the model of "chamberlain". All these go back to Late Latin francus "free" or "a free man", from Frankish *Frank, "a freeman", literally, "a Frank"; cognate with Old High German Franko.

== Significance ==
The social class of franklin came to mean (latterly) a person not only free (not in feudal servitude) but also owning a freehold. Yet franklins were not members of the "landed gentry" (knights, esquires and gentlemen, the lower grades of the upper class), let alone of the peerage (barons, viscounts, earls/counts, marquis, dukes), evidently represents the beginnings of a real-property-owning middle class in England during the 14th and 15th centuries. As such, they comprised one of the highest ranks open to men not of the nobility.

Note that the land and property owned by this English middle class might well be in a rural area. This is one factor distinguishing this class from the mainland European bourgeoisie, a social class whose name means "town-dwellers".

== Magna Carta ==
Magna Carta gave rights to free men and the peasantry. "No free man shall be seized or imprisoned, or stripped of his rights or possessions, or outlawed or exiled. Nor will we proceed with force against him. Except by the lawful judgement of his equals or by the law of the land. To no one will we sell, to no one deny or delay right or justice."

== Appearance in literature ==
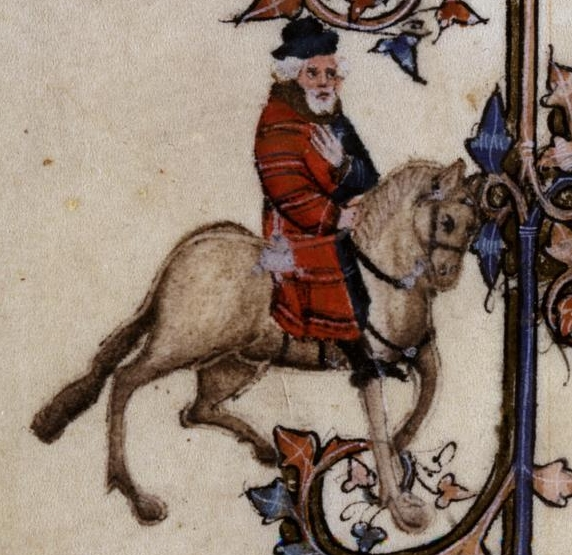
The Franklin, in the illustrated Ellesmere Chaucer. His fine clothing indicates his wealth and high status.

- A franklin is one of the characters in The Canterbury Tales by Geoffrey Chaucer.
- Cedric of Rotherwood, a character in the historical novel Ivanhoe by Sir Walter Scott, is a franklin.
- Georgette Heyer uses the term in her novel The Conqueror (1931), which is set in 11th-century Falaise, Normandy.
- The English translation of Sigrid Undset's The Master of Hestviken tetralogy, about medieval Norway, names the books' protagonist "a franklin". While not precisely identical to the English class, the Norwegian equivalent was also a class of landowners, often enjoying substantial properties and prestige, but no title of any kind.

== Modern usage ==
Unlike some other terms referring to social class or status in medieval England such as esquire and gentleman, franklin has no modern usage other than as a historical reference to the Middle Ages.

Several English surnames are thought to derive from this class of people. They developed in the Middle Ages as a status surname, indicating a 'free man'. They derived from the Old French feudal term franchomme; composed of the elements 'franc' (in its original meaning 'free') and 'homme', man, from the Latin 'homo'. The various spellings gradually altered because of association with such common English placename suffixes such as '-combe' and '-ham'. The modern surname is found as (among other variations) Francombe, Frankcomb, Francom, Frankcom, Frankum and Frankham.

== See also ==
- Bourgeoisie
- Esquire
- "The Franklin's Prologue and Tale"
- Free tenant
- Gentleman
- Knight
- Middle class
- Nobility
  - British nobility
- Social class
- Yeoman
