= Benjamin Franklin (disambiguation) =

Benjamin Franklin (1706–1790) was an American Founding Father, statesman, writer, scientist, inventor, and printer.

Benjamin or Ben Franklin may also refer to:

== People ==
- Ben Franklin (Canadian politician), full name Benson Franklin (1942–2003), mayor of Nepean, Ontario
- Ben Franklin (Australian politician) (born c. 1974), politician in the New South Wales Legislative Council
- Ben Franklin (Wisconsin politician) (born 1982), state legislator
- Ben Franklin (River City), fictional character
- Benjamin Franklin (clergyman) (1812–1878), American religious leader
- Benjamin Franklin (surgeon) (1844–1917), British surgeon
- Benjamin Cromwell Franklin (1805–1873), Texas state senator
- Benjamin J. Franklin (1839–1898), U.S. representative from Missouri, and territorial governor of Arizona
- Benjamin Franklin Bache (surgeon) (1801–1881), U.S. Navy surgeon
- Benjamin Franklin Bache (1769–1798), American journalist
- Benjamin Franklin Butler (1818–1893), American politician, lawyer, and businessman
- Ramiz Galvão (Benjamin Franklin de Ramiz Galvão, 1846–1938), Brazilian doctor, writer, professor and philologist
- Benjamin F. Hall (1814–1891), Colorado judge
- Benjamin F. McAdoo (1920–1981), American architect

== Ships ==
- USS Franklin, name for a series of U.S. Navy vessels
- USS Benjamin Franklin, ballistic missile submarine
- Ben Franklin (PX-15), research submersible
- CMA CGM Benjamin Franklin, container cargo vessel
- Benjamin Franklin, one of the fireboats of Philadelphia, in service since 1950
- PS Benjamin Franklin, a paddle steamer built in 1842

== Arts and literature ==
- The Autobiography of Benjamin Franklin, written from 1771 to 1790
- Benjamin Franklin (2002 TV series)
- "Ben Franklin" (The Office), an episode of the television series The Office
- Benjamin Franklin, Jr., a 1943 Our Gang short comedy film
- Benjamin Franklin (miniseries), a 1974-75 American television miniseries
- Benjamin Franklin Pierce, a character from TV-series M*A*S*H, played by Alan Alda
- Benjamin Franklin (film), a 2022 two-part documentary film created by Ken Burns
- Benjamin Franklin (book), a non-fiction biography by Carl Van Doren

=== Sculptures of Benjamin Franklin ===
- Statue of Benjamin Franklin (Portland, Oregon), a 1931 sandstone by George Berry in Portland, Oregon, U.S.
- Benjamin Franklin (University of Pennsylvania), an 1899 bronze by John J. Boyle in Philadelphia, Pennsylvania, U.S.
- Benjamin Franklin (Jouvenal), an 1889 Carrara marble by Jacques Jouvenal in Washington, D.C., U.S.
- Benjamin Franklin National Memorial, a colossal statue by James Earle Fraser in Philadelphia, Pennsylvania, U.S.
- Statue of Benjamin Franklin (San Francisco), an 1879 bronze by an unknown artist in San Francisco, California, U.S.
- Statue of Benjamin Franklin (Stanford University), a marble by Antonio Frilli in Stanford, California, U.S.

== Other ==
- "Ben Franklin" (song), a 2021 song by Snail Mail
- Benjamin Franklin ($100), a nickname for the United States one hundred-dollar bill
- Ben Franklin (company), a variety-store chain
- Ben Franklin, Texas, an unincorporated community in Delta County
- Benjamin Franklin Bridge, between Philadelphia, Pennsylvania and Camden, New Jersey
- Benjamin Franklin Parkway, Philadelphia, Pennsylvania
- Ben Franklin Place, a building in Ottawa named after the former Mayor of Nepean
- Benjamin Franklin's phonetic alphabet
- Benjamin Miles "C-Note" Franklin, fictional prisoner and ex-soldier in the series Prison Break
- Benjamin Franklin Rodriguez, the main character from the second cinematic of The Sandlot

== See also ==
- Benjamin Franklin School (disambiguation)
