= Robert Franklin =

Robert, Bob, or Bobby Franklin may refer to:

- Robert Michael Franklin Jr. (born 1954), American author, theologian, ordained minister and academic administrator, president of Morehouse College
- Robert Franklin (divine) (1630–1684), British nonconformist divine
- Bobby Franklin (1957–2011), American state legislator from Georgia
- Bobby Franklin (American football) (1936–2025), American football safety for the Cleveland Browns
- Bob Franklin (Australian footballer) (1886–1959), Australian rules footballer who played with South Melbourne
- Bob Franklin (comedian) (born 1965), British comedian who has lived in Australia since 1989
