= Deborah Morris and John Franklin =

New York colonial patriots

Deborah Morris Franklin
- Born: Deborah Morris; September 15, 1736
- Died: September 23, 1787 (aged 51)
- Known for: Colonial patriot who aided prison ship inmates, for which she was banished from the city by British Commander Henry Clinton
- Spouse(s): John Franklin, m. July 8, 1756
- Parent(s): Sarah (née Powell) and Anthony Morris IV

John Franklin
- Born: April 27, 1732
- Died: August 29, 1801 (aged 69)
- Occupation: Wine merchant
- Known for: Assistance to patriot prisoners of war on British prison ships and member of the Committee of One Hundred
- Spouse(s): Deborah Morris, m. July 8, 1756; Letitia Townsend Underhill, m. May 13, 1789
- Parent(s): Mary (née Pearsall) and Thomas Franklin

Deborah (née Morris) Franklin (September 15, 1736 – September 23, 1787) and John Franklin (April 27, 1732 – August 29, 1801) were two Americans who assisted American prisoners of war in New York City during the American Revolutionary War. Deborah helped American prisoners held at the New York City Hall, the Battery, and sugar houses. She and her son rowed a boat out to the prison ships in the New York Harbor at night to deliver food and other necessary supplies. She was banished from New York by British General Henry Clinton in November 1780. The following year, John accepted the position of Agent for Prisons in New York, serving under George Washington, but Clinton objected to John taking the position.

Beginning in 1775, John served on the Committee of One Hundred and the Provincial Congress.

== Early life and family ==
Deborah Morris, born September 15, 1736, was a daughter of Sarah (née Powell) and Anthony Morris IV. In 1752, Deborah inherited a house in Philadelphia at 135 Pine Street from Samuel Powell. Major Anthony Morris died at the Battle of Princeton (January 3, 1777).

Deborah married John Franklin on July 8, 1756, in Philadelphia. The son of Mary (née Pearsall) and Thomas Franklin, John was born on April 27, 1732. His siblings, born between 1727 and 1740 were Walter, Sarah, Thomas, Mary, Samuel, and James. Their marriage was an alliance of two aristocratic families, and an example of marriages between a family from Philadelphia, the Morris family, and the Franklins from New York.

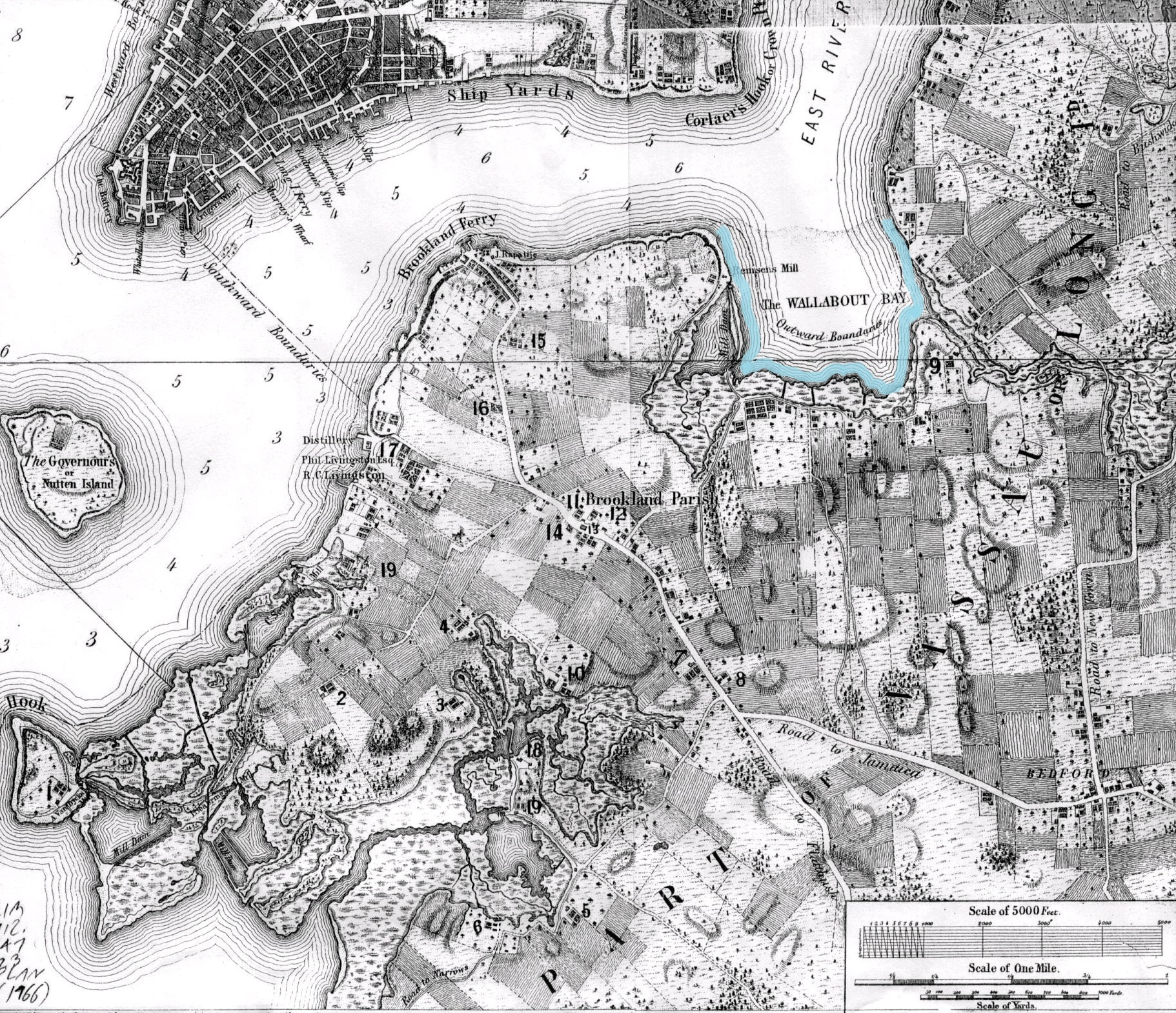
Map of Brooklyn, New York, made in 1766, with outlines of Wallabout Bay, where prison ships were anchored

The couple attended the Philadelphia Monthly Meeting. Between 1757 and 1773, Deborah and John had eight children, Sarah, Mary, Thomas, Phoebe, Elizabeth, Anthony, Rebecca, and Walter. By 1779, the Franklins lived near the "New Slip" in the shipyards (west-northwest of Wallabout Bay in New York Harbor).

== Franklin brothers ==
John was a successful merchant, including wine, and he owned ships and operated a shipping business. John and his brother Walter were particularly well known as wealthy, community-serving Quakers of New York. Like his brother, Walter was elected to the Committee of One Hundred on May 1, 1775, to manage conflict between the British and the colonists in New York. He was a partner of the international trading firm, Franklin, Robinson & Company as well as a member of the Provincial Congress. Brother Samuel was a wealthy banker.

== American Revolution ==
In 1775, John was elected as a member of New York's first Provincial Congress and sat on the Committee of One Hundred.

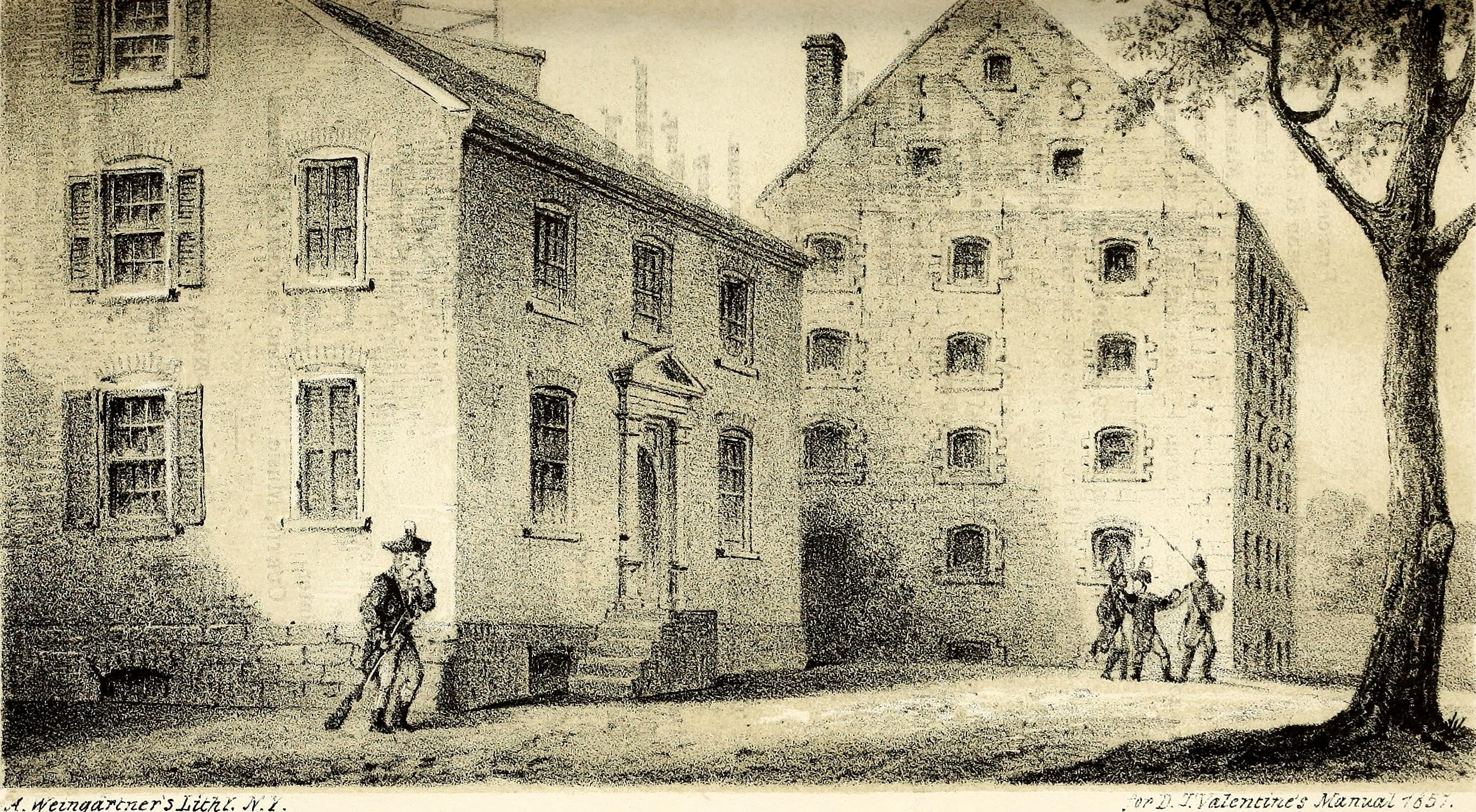
Rhinelander's sugar house & residence, between William & Rose Streets. The last of the sugar house prisons of the Revolution

During the American Revolutionary War, Deborah, John, and their son Anthony, born in 1768, provided care for American soldiers who were taken as prisoners of war by British forces and held captive in prison ships in New York Harbor. Deborah and her son rowed out in a boat to deliver food and "necessities" to the prison ships off Blackwell Island (now Roosevelt Island), as the Americans onboard were starving. Elizabeth Burgin, a neighbor, provided food to prisoners and helped more than 200 American prisoners of war escape from the prison ships.

The British allowed women to provide aid to a man that they knew, but women who provided helped a number of men were looked on with suspicion. Deborah provided aid to men in sugar houses, prisons at City Hall and the Battery, as well as prison ships. British General Henry Clinton banished her from the city on November 21, 1780. She went to Philadelphia on horseback. The experience left her with frost-bitten feet and thereafter in poor health. Deborah's father died in 1780 and she inherited a brick building at Walnut and Front Streets along the Delaware River, near the Morris Wharf.

In December 1780, General George Washington offered John the position of Agent to the Prisoners, with the caveat that Henry Clinton would allow him to return to New York. On January 4, 1781, Franklin wrote to Washington that he accepted the position that would bring him back to the city that Deborah was banished from, but a position that he considered important. Washington wrote Franklin on February 14, 1781, stating that Clinton objected to John holding the position in New York.

Nevertheless, Deborah stayed in Philadelphia and looked after their pre-teen son, Tommy. The family lived together in New York by 1783. Deborah remained there until her death.

== Later years and death ==
Deborah died on September 23, 1787, when John was in transit from St. Petersburg. She was interred at the Friend's Burying Ground in Philadelphia. Congress reportedly adjourned to attend Deborah's funeral. The Daughters of the American Revolution planted a tree and installed a marker at the Gracie Mansion garden in New York City in her memory in 1928.

On May 13, 1789, John married Letitia Townsend Underhill, the widow of Benjamin Underhill and daughter of Sylvanus Townsend. John died on August 29, 1801. Business letters that John wrote to his brothers-in-law, Samuel and Israel Morris, are held in the William Henry Russell collection of Morris family papers at Haley Museum and Library Archives, Wilmington, Delaware.

== Bibliography ==
- Moon, Robert Charles (1898). The Morris family of Philadelphia, descendants of Anthony Morris, born 1654 – died 1721. Philadelphia: R.C. Moon.
