= Nobia A. Franklin =

American beautician

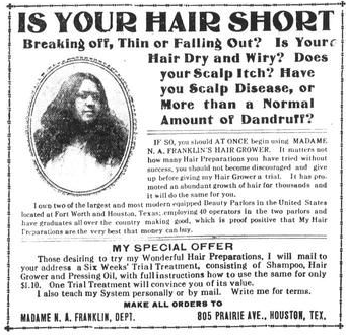
- Born: 1892; Cuero, Texas, U.S.
- Died: 1934 (aged 41–42); Chicago, Illinois, U.S.
- Occupation(s): Beautician, entrepreneur
- Known for: Founding the Franklin School of Beauty Culture (Franklin Beauty School)

Nobia A. Franklin (1892–1934, also known as Madame N.A. Franklin) was a Texas beautician and entrepreneur. Her business, geared towards beauty products for black women, was ranked third in the country behind Annie M. Turnbo-Malone's company and Madame C.J. Walker's "beauty empire." Her cosmetics were "meant to flatter, rather than lighten darker skin tones." Franklin's beauty products were never patented.

== Biography ==
Franklin was born in Cuero, Texas. She was married on June 7, 1907, though she kept her name and passed on her last name to her daughter, Abbie. In 1910, she moved to San Antonio and opened a salon inside her home. During that time, she also sold her homemade hair products door-to-door to black families. She was consciously emulating other "beauty moguls" like Walker.

Franklin moved to Fort Worth in 1916. She operated a beauty salon there for a short time before she moved to Houston. In 1917, she opened the Franklin School of Beauty Culture. She also opened a manufacturing center for beauty projects in the same year.

In 1922, Franklin moved to Chicago, and taught the "Franklin way" of hair styling to others. She established a headquarters on South State Street, a branch on Grand Boulevard and a manufacturing plant for her beauty products on East 35th Street in Chicago. She maintained her original school in Houston, even as she was expanding into other locations. In Houston, W.L. McCoy was the general manager of her salon, overseeing a renovation of the building in 1924.

She began to prepare her daughter, Abbie to take over the business; in 1927, they formed the N.A. Franklin Association of Beauty Culture. In 1930, for health reasons, she turned over her business to Abbie and her son-in-law, James H. (J.H.) Jemison. When Franklin died in 1934, her business was inherited by Abbie and Jemison.

== Legacy ==
Abbie and Jemison continued to promote Franklin's beauty school, although they withdrew from Chicago and focused on Houston after 1934. Franklin's beauty school is still in operation in Houston. It is considered the "oldest continuously operated beauty school in Texas," and before desegregation, was the largest African American beauty school in the Southern United States.
