= Ben Franklin Academy =

Private senior high school in DeKalb County, Georgia, United States

Benjamin Franklin Academy
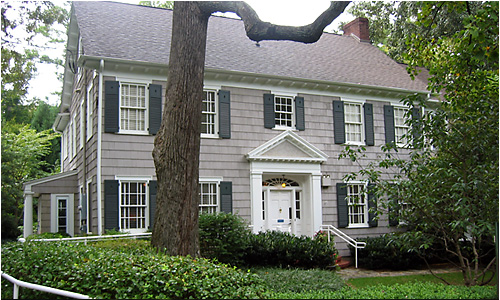

Location
- Atlanta, Georgia 30329; United States; 33.802968°N 84.332881°W

Information
- School type: Private, coeducational
- Established: 1987
- Founder: Wood Smethurst and Martha Bruner Burdette
- CEEB code: 110134
- Headmaster: Martha Burdette
- Grades: 9-12
- Enrollment: 130
- Average class size: 5
- Student to teacher ratio: 6:1
- Campus type: Suburban
- Houses: Two
- Colors: Blue and white
- Slogan: "Achieve and Flourish "
- Athletics: Golf, cross country, ultimate frisbee
- Team name: Patriots
- Publication: Poor Richard's Gazette
- Website: benfranklinacademy.org

Ben Franklin Academy (BFA) is a private senior high school in unincorporated DeKalb County, Georgia, United States, in Greater Atlanta. It follows a "mastery" curriculum, and serves students in grades 9–12. The school is located at 1585 Clifton Road NE, 30329, with an Atlanta postal address.

== Gallery ==
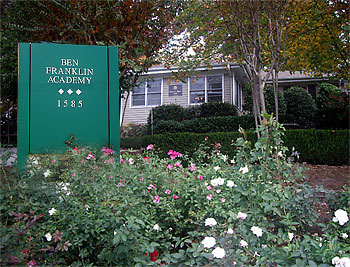
Emory C. Black Hall (Senior House)

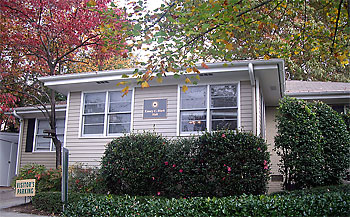
The Senior House (close-up view)

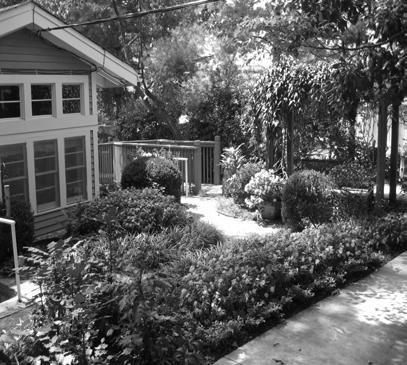
Emory C. Black gardens

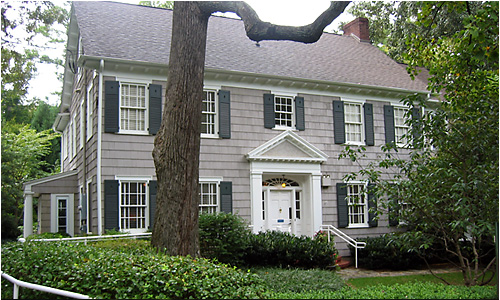
The Junior House

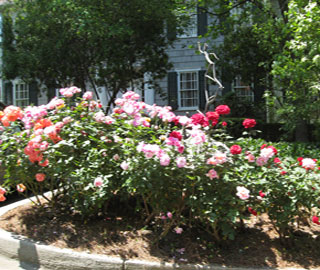
The Junior House Rose Garden
