= Michael Franklin =

Michael Franklin may refer to:

- Michael J. Franklin, American software entrepreneur and computer scientist
- Michael T. Franklin (born 1952), American musician and record producer
- Sir Michael Franklin (civil servant) (1927–2019), English civil servant
- Michael Francklin (1733–1782), or Franklin, lieutenant governor of Nova Scotia
