= Bob Franklin (Australian footballer) =

Australian rules footballer

Personal information
- Full name: Robert James Franklin
- Born: 5 October 1886; Port Melbourne, Victoria
- Died: 20 September 1959 (aged 72); Fitzroy, Victoria

Playing career^{1}
Years	Club	Games (Goals)
1906	South Melbourne	5 (1)
- ^{1} Playing statistics correct to the end of 1906.

Robert James Franklin (5 October 1886 – 20 September 1959) was an Australian rules footballer who played with South Melbourne in the Victorian Football League (VFL).
