= Lynn Franklin (writer, born 1946) =

American writer (1946–2021)

- Born: Lynn Celia Franklin; August 18, 1946; Chicago, Illinois, U.S.
- Died: July 19, 2021 (aged 74); New York City. U.S.
- Education: American University
- Occupations: Literary agent, memoirist

Lynn Celia Franklin (August 18, 1946 – July 19, 2021) was a literary agent and memoirist.

== Biography ==
Franklin was born on August 18, 1946, in Chicago to career Army officer Col. Joseph B. Franklin and British antique dealer Theresa (Levy) Franklin. Due to her father's military career, she attended schools across the world and graduated high school in Fairfax, Virginia. In 1968, she graduated from the American University in Washington, D.C., with a degree in French. In 1965, while enrolled in American University, she became pregnant but ended the relationship with the father of the child prior to marriage. Franklin was sent to a home for unwed mothers and subsequently gave the baby up for adoption.

After graduation, she worked for Kramer Books and then the publisher Hachette. In 1978, Franklin formed a boutique literary agency, Lynn C. Franklin Associates, in New York specializing in nonfiction. Her clients included Desmond Tutu and Deepak Chopra, Rafer Johnson, and Jody Williams. In 1992, Franklin formed Franklin & Siegal Associates with Todd R. Siegal to represent publishers and scout books for Hollywood.

In 1998, Franklin wrote the book, May the Circle Be Unbroken: An Intimate Journey into the Heart of Adoption where she tells the story of relinquishing her son through adoption during the baby scoop era and their reunion 27 years later. The memoir also discusses legal and practical issues in adoption providing perspective from child, birth mother and adoptive parents. She writes how only after reuniting was she able to heal from feelings of the shame and trauma of losing him.

Franklin died on July 19, 2021, aged 74, of metastatic breast cancer at her home in New York City.
