= Walter Franklin =

Walter Franklin may refer to:

- Walter Franklin (cricketer) (1891–1968), English cricketer
- Walter Franklin (judge) (1773–1836), Pennsylvania attorney general and judge
- Walter S. Franklin (politician) (1799–1838), politician from Pennsylvania
- Walter S. Franklin (railroad executive) (1884–1972), president of the Pennsylvania Railroad (PRR)
