= Charles Samuel Franklin =

British radio pioneer

Charles Samuel Franklin (23 March 1879 – 10 December 1964), who published as C. S. Franklin, was a noted British radio pioneer.

== Biography ==
Franklin was born in London, the youngest of a family of 13, and educated at Finsbury Technical College in Finsbury, England, under Silvanus P. Thompson. After graduation in 1899 he joined the Marconi Company where he spent his entire professional career. He was first sent to South Africa to provide equipment for the Boer War, then spent 2 years in Russia. After his return to the UK, he invented a number of important radio devices including the variable capacitor (patented 1902), ganged tuning (1907), variable coupling (1907), coaxial cable, and the Franklin oscillator.

Today Franklin is best known for the Franklin beam aerial, his shortwave antenna. From the Marconi company's Poldhu station in 1923 and 1924, he sent shortwave transmissions to Guglielmo Marconi on his yacht Electra in the South Atlantic.

Franklin was also active in early television development. In 1935 the trustees leased part of Alexandra Palace to the BBC, which used it as the production and transmission center for their new BBC Television Service. Franklin designed its antenna, and the world's first public broadcasts of high-definition television were made from this site in 1936.

Franklin received the 1922 IRE Morris N. Liebmann Memorial Award "for his investigations of short wave directional transmission and reception". He died at Buckhurst Hill, aged 85.

== High-efficiency medium-wave transmitting antenna ==
Franklin received British patent 242342 in 1924 for "a pronounced directional effect from aerials of the type that are electrically long in comparison with the signal wavelength".

The antenna is so physically tall (about 1,813 feet at 540 kHz, and about 612 feet at 1600 kHz) that its use is generally restricted to frequencies of 1400 kHz and above, with one example at 1500 kHz (KSTP, St. Paul, MN, non-directional, daytime only) and two examples at 1530 kHz (KFBK, Sacramento, CA, directional day and night using different parameters day and night).

Pseudo-Franklins have been employed below 1400 kHz, however, to good effect, but nowhere near as good as a true Franklin.

A true Franklin (180 over 180 degrees; 360 degrees, total) has an efficiency of about 510 mV/m/kW at 1 km. A pseudo-Franklin (180 over 120 degrees; 300 degrees, total) has an efficiency of about 470 mV/m/kW at 1 km. Another pseudo-Franklin (120 over 120 degrees; 240 degrees, total) has an efficiency of about 430 mV/m/kW at 1 km.

As a conventional antenna of 225 degrees has an efficiency of about 440 mV/m/kW at 1 km, exceeding that of a 120 over 120 degree pseudo-Franklin, one might naturally assume that a 225 degree antenna would be preferred, but this is not the case for powers above about 5 kW as a self-cancellation effect occurs in the fringe reception area.

For 10 kW and above, 195 degrees is optimum (about 400 mV/m/kW at 1 km), or a pseudo-Franklin or a Franklin may be employed, where each of these avoids or significantly reduces this self-cancellation.

== "Rio" Treaty and other considerations ==
In some cases, a station's efficiency may be restricted to 362.10 mV/m/kW at 1 km for Class A stations, to 281.63 mV/m/kW at 1 km for Class B stations or to 241.40 mV/m/kW at 1 km for Class C stations, unless a higher efficiency was "grandfathered". If so restricted, then a high-efficiency antenna, such as a Franklin, could be employed only if the transmitter power was reduced accordingly.

Older, "legacy" stations are more likely to be so "grandfathered" rather than newer, post-"Rio" stations, hence older, "legacy" stations are more likely to employ Franklin, pseudo-Franklin or other high-efficiency transmitting antennas.

For practical reasons, 90 degrees (about 310 mV/m/kW at 1 km) is taken to be the "gold standard", but shorter (particularly for lower frequency stations) or taller (particularly for higher frequency stations) are often found.

Also, for practical reasons, 199 feet antennas, occasionally with "top loading", are often specified as this is the maximum height in order to avoid tower lighting, and in a number of cases tower painting, for aviation obstruction purposes.
