= Benjamin C. Marsh =

American lobbyist (1878–1952)

Benjamin Clarke Marsh (1878–1952) was a social worker, journalist, and Georgist activist who helped pioneer the city planning movement in the United States.

== Social reformer ==
Born in Bulgaria to American missionary parents, Marsh brought evangelic zeal to the causes he espoused. After working with charities in Pennsylvania, he went to New York and became involved in poverty issues. Overcrowding in places like New York City's Lower East Side led the National Consumers League and other groups to establish the Committee on Congestion of Population in 1907; Marsh was hired as the committee's first executive secretary. He toured Europe to learn how housing was being regulated there, organized anti-congestion exhibits and made numerous speeches on the subject. In 1909, he published the first American book dedicated exclusively to city planning, An Introduction to City Planning: Democracy's Challenge and the American City. The book lauded Frankfurt, Germany, for its approach to planning and advocated for zoning, land taxes and municipal control of undeveloped land. Marsh believed that such regulations would prevent the overbuilding he associated with the development of slums.

== Consolidation of the planning profession ==
Up to that point, city planning in North American had been primarily focused on aesthetics, as exemplified by the City Beautiful movement. Most city plans of the era were prepared by architects and landscape architects. Marsh helped planning evolve by more strongly infusing it with social considerations. His Committee on Congestion of Population partnered with New York City's Municipal Art Society in 1909 to present the first exhibition on city planning ever held in the United States. As a result of the attention that Marsh brought to the issue of overcrowding, in 1910 local officials established the City Commission on Congestion of Population with Marsh as its secretary. Its report of the following year caused controversy for recommending that a new land tax be considered but eventually led to New York adopting the first comprehensive zoning scheme in the U.S.

Marsh's energetic efforts also bore fruit on a national scale. In 1909 he organized the first national meeting on planning, the National Conference on City Planning and Congestion, held in Washington, D.C., on May 21–22, 1909. Many of the country's most prominent urbanists were in attendance, and the conference was a direct antecedent to the establishment in 1917 of the American City Planning Institute, now known as the American Planning Association.

== Subsequent work ==
While Marsh helped bring about the establishment of modern urban planning, his path diverged from that of the planning profession. Business people saw his views on land taxation as radical and his refusal to compromise led other planning advocates to denounce him. Frederick Law Olmsted Jr. maneuvered for control of the National Conference's agenda. Ostracized, Marsh returned to Bulgaria as correspondent during the Balkan Wars in 1912 and spent there two years. After returning to the U.S., he directed the Farmers National Council and in 1918 became executive secretary of the People's Reconstruction League (later known as the Anti-Monopoly League), which advocated on behalf of labor unions. In 1929, Marsh persuaded his friend John Dewey, who was also a dedicated Georgist, to become its president. At Dewey's insistence the organization was renamed the People's Lobby. Marsh remained with the People's Lobby until his death. When the Federal Regulation of Lobbying Act was adopted in 1946, Marsh was the first lobbyist to register with the government.
