= Charles Franklin (writer) =

English writer

Charles Franklin, the pen-name of Frank Hugh Usher (22 October 1909 – 1976), born in Leicester, Leicestershire, was an English writer of mystery novels and spy novels. He also wrote under the pen-names Frank Usher, and Frank Lester.

== Biography ==
Little interested in the whodunit, still in vogue in England in the immediate post-war period, he followed in the footsteps of Peter Cheyney and David Hume and showed a clear penchant for Noir fiction and, less surprisingly, from the 1960s, for spy novels.

Under the pseudonym Charles Franklin, he published his first novel, Exit Without Permit, in 1946, with his most famous recurring hero, Grant Garfield, a young and intrepid lawyer, sometimes assisted in his thirteen investigations, by his charming secretary Barbara Wenthworth. After abandoning Garfield, he wrote three novels for Inspector Jim Burgess, and three others for the spy Maxine Dangerfield, a kind of female James Bond. He also published under Charles Franklin's name historical works dealing with famous legal or criminal cases.

Under his birth name, he was the author of the adventures of Daye Smith, a portrait painter and amateur sleuth. He also used this name for his fantasy short stories and a short series of spy novels centred on the duo of Amanda Curzon and her sidekick Oscar Sallis.

== Works ==
=== Novels ===
==== Grant Garfield series ====
- Exit Without Permit (1946)
- The Mark of Kane (1949)
- Storm in an Inkpot (1949)
- She'll Love You Dead (1950)
- Maid for Murder (1951)
- Gallows for a Fool (1952)
- The Stranger Came Back (1953)
- Stop That Man (1954)
- Girl in Shadow (1955)
- Death on My Shoulder (1958)
- Breathe No More (1959)
- Guilty You Must Be (1959)
- Fear Runs Softly (1961)

==== Inspector Jim Burgess series ====
- Guilt for Innocence (1960)
- Kill Me and Live (1961)
- The Bath of Acid (1962)

==== Maxine Dangerfield series ====
- The Dangerous Ones (1964)
- On the Day of the Shooting (1965)
- The Escape (1968)

==== Other novels ====
- Cocktails With a Stranger (1947)
- Rope of Sand (1948)
- One Night to Kill (1950)
- Escape to Death (1951)
- Play With Death (1953)
- Perchance to Kill (1954)
- The Trembling Thread (1955)
- Out of Time (1956)
- No Other Victim (1957)
- Face the Music (1957)
- Darling Murderess (1957)
- A Handful of Sinners (1960)
- Murder Before Dinner (1963)
- The Fortieth Victim (1963)
- A Mirror of Murder (1964)
- Woman in the Case (1967)
- Death in the East (1967)
- The Murder Column (1970)
- The Third Degree (1970)
- The Home Secretary Affair (1971)
- Died in the Grass (1971)
- The KGB is Here (1972)
- Murder on My Hands (1973)

==== Daye Smith series (by Frank Usher) ====
- Ghost of a Chance (1956)
- The Lonely Cage (1956)
- Portrait of Fear (1957)
- The Price of Death (1957)
- Death is Waiting (1958)
- First To Kill (1959)
- Death in Error (1959)
- Die, My Darling (1960)
- Shot in the Dark (1961)
- The Faceless Stranger (1961)
- Who Killed Rosa Gray? (1962)
- Fall Into My Grave (1962)
- Stairway to Murder (1964)

==== Amanda Curzon and Oscar Sallis series (by Frank Usher) ====
- The Man From Moscow (1965)
- No Flowers in Brazlov (1968)
- The Boston Crab (1970)
- Deadly Legacy (1971)

==== Other novels by Frank Usher ====
- Fear Runs Softly (1961)
- Body in Velvet (1963)

==== Geoffrey Slade series (by Frank Lester) ====
- The Corpse Wore Rubies (1958)
- Death in the South Wind (1958)
- The Golden Murder (1959)
- Death of A Pale Man (1960)
- The Bamboo Girl (1961)
- Hide My Body (1961)
- Fly Me a Killer (1962)

==== Other novels by Frank Lester ====
- Death of a Frightened Traveller (1959)
- Lead Me to the Gallows (1962)
- Finch Takes to Crime (1963)

=== Short stories by Frank Usher ===
- Ghosts of Ancient Egypt (1966)
- Hauntings Royal (1966)
- The Phantoms of Littlecote (1966)
- The Brown Lady of Raynham (1966)
- Ghosts of Old France (1966)
- The Haunting of Hinton Ampner (1966)
- Mischief Among the Dead (1966)
- The Fur-Trader's Corpse and the Gold-Miners' Vengeance (1966)
- Shades of Murder (1966)
- The Strange Haunting at Ballechin (1966)
- The Ghosts of Versailles (1966)
- A Bargain With a Ghost (1966)
- The Mystery of Borley (1966)
- Brighton Ghosts (1966)
- The Great White Bat (1969)
- The Walking Dead (1969)
- The Bath of Acid (1969)
- The Black Dahlia (1969)
- Amazonian Horrors (1969)

=== Other publications by Charles Franklin ===
- The World’s Worst Murderers (1965)
- The World’s Famous Trials (1967)
- The World’s Greatest Scandals (1967)
- Spies of the Twentieth Century (1967)
- They Walked a Crooked Mile: an Account of the Greatest Scandals, Swindlers and Outrages of All Time (1967)
- World Famous Acquittals (1970)

== Sources ==
- Baudou, Jacques; Schleret, Jean-Jacques (1984). Le Vrai Visage du Masque, vol. 1 (in French). Paris: Futuropolis. p. 210. OCLC 311506692.
- Martinetti, Anne (1997). Le Masque: histoire d'une collection (in French). Amiens: Encrage. pp. 72–73. ISBN 978-2-906-38982-3.
- Mesplède, Claude; Schleret, Jean-Jacques (1982). SN, voyage au bout de la Noire: inventaire de 732 auteurs et de leurs œuvres publiés en séries Noire et Blème: suivi d'une filmographie complète (in French). Paris: Futuropolis. p. 142. OCLC 11972030.
