= Sugar house prisons in New York City =

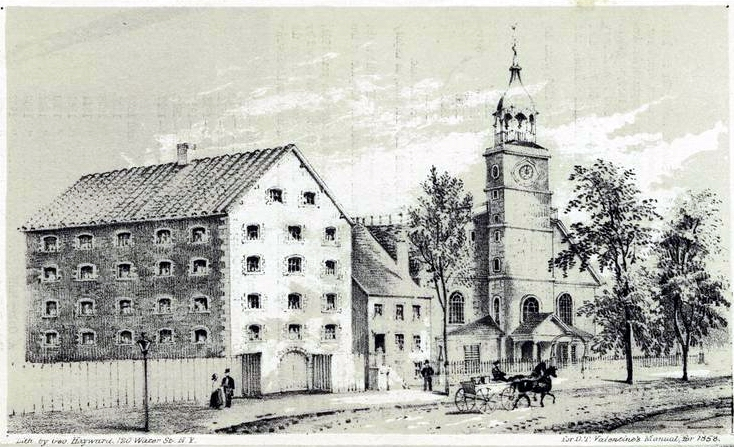
The Livingston sugar house (left) on Liberty Street in Manhattan once detained 400 to 500 American prisoners of the Revolutionary War.

Sugar houses in New York City were used as makeshift prisons by British forces during the American Revolutionary War. Three different sugar houses were used to house American prisoners of war along with public buildings and prison ships. The first batch of American prisoners to be imprisoned in the sugar houses were 2,837 men who had been captured during the Battle of Fort Washington on November 16, 1776. All three houses were overcrowded and the prisoners contained within them only received supplies from American authorities and private citizens. The British continued to use the sugar houses as prisons until they evacuated New York City in 1783.

== Background ==
During the 18th century, a large part of commerce in New York City was trade with the British West Indies. Destined for refineries, sugar and molasses imported from Jamaica and Sint Eustatius were stored in warehouses built by merchant families, such as the Bayards, Cuylers, Livingstons, Rhinelanders, Roosevelts, and the Van Cortlands. Three of these large structures were known for being used by the British Army to house prisoners of war during their occupation of New York City in the midst of the American Revolution.

== Prisons ==
=== Livingston's sugar house ===
Sugar house locations in New York City.

The sugar house on Crown (now Liberty) Street in Manhattan was a six-story stone building which had been built in 1754 by the Livingston family as a refinery with very low floors. According to Revolutionary War veteran Levi Hanford, who was captured in March 1777, the cramped conditions initially housed about 40 to 50 prisoners. The population soon swelled to between 400 and 500, though attrition was constant due to those succumbing to starvation and disease. Rations consisted of pork and sea biscuits, which were often moldy from sea water and infested with worms. Nevertheless, the starving prisoners seldom refused the food, which was made consumable by placing it in a kettle of water and skimming off the parasites. Supplies for sick prisoners were provided by the fledgling American government, as Hanford stated that "the British furnished nothing." Deceased prisoners were sewn up into their blankets and placed in a corner of the yard for pickup by a dead cart in the morning; as many as fifteen bodies once accumulated in the period of one day. Prisoner exchanges were organized with the prisoners held longest having priority. The structure was later demolished in 1846.

In the northeast corner of Trinity Churchyard in Lower Manhattan stands the Soldiers' Monument, with an inscription reading: "At a meeting of Citizens held at the City Hall of the City of New York June 8, 1852: It was resolved That the Erection of a becoming Monument with appropriate inscriptions by Trinity Church to the Memory of those great and good Men who died whilst in Captivity in the old [Livingston] Sugar House and were interred in Trinity Church Yard in this City will be an act gratifying not only to the attendants of this Meeting but to Every American Citizen." The claim those prisoners are buried in Trinity Churchyard is disputed by Charles I. Bushnell, who argued in 1863 that Trinity Church would not have accepted the burials because it was a Church of England parish, the state church headed by the British monarch they rebelled against. Historian Edwin G. Burrows explains how the controversy related to a proposal to build a public street through the churchyard.

=== Rhinelander's sugar house ===
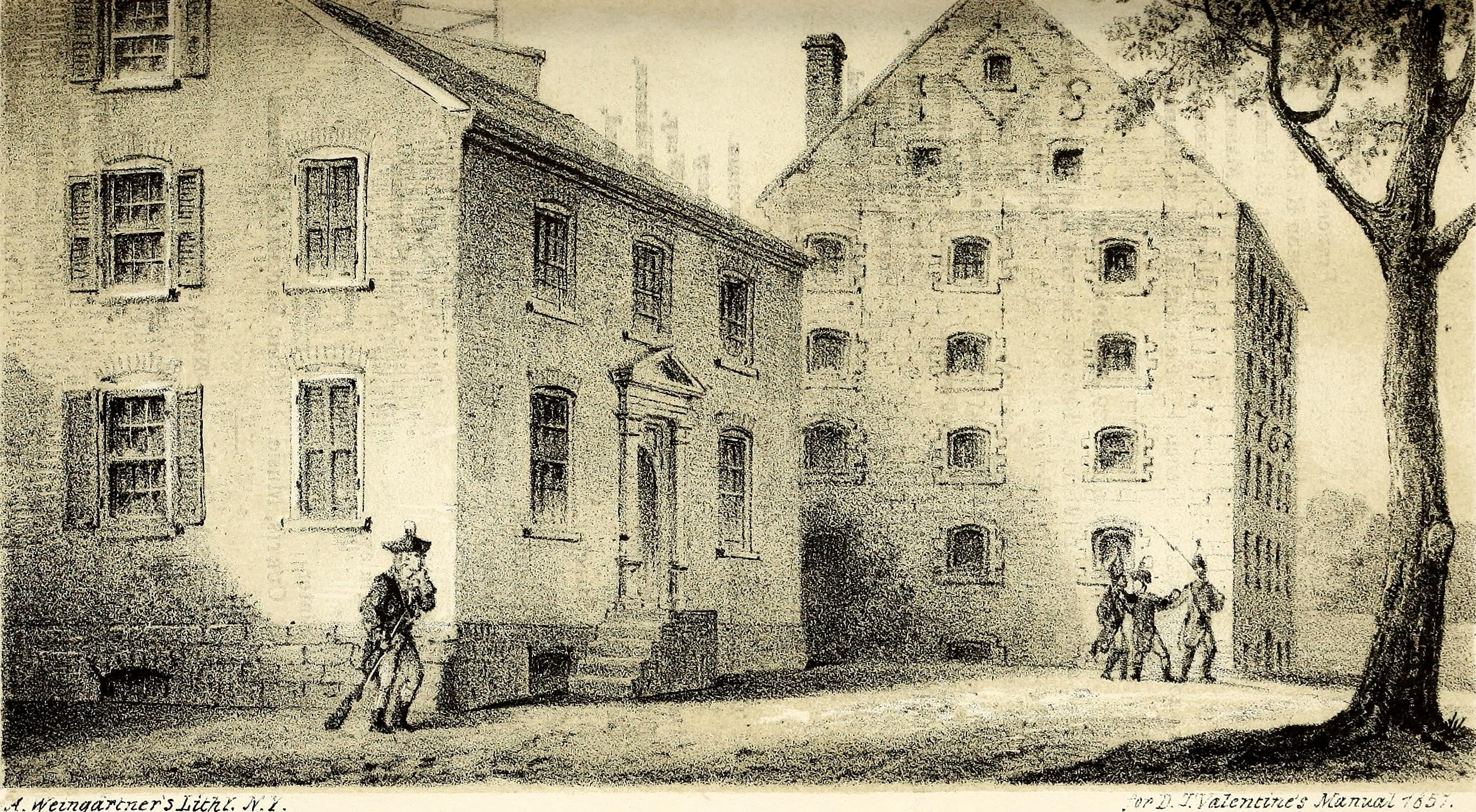
Rhinelander's sugar house & residence, between William & Rose Streets. The last of the sugar house prisons of the Revolution

The sugar house on the corner of Rose (now William) Street and Duane Street in Lower Manhattan was a five-story brick warehouse. Built in 1763 by William Rhinelander, the structure originally stored molasses and sugar next to his own residence. During the Revolutionary War it is believed to have been used by the British army as a prison. In 1852 Benson J. Lossing wrote:

Van Cortlandt's sugar house, which stood at the northwest corner of Trinity Churchyard, corner of Thames and Lumber [now Trinity Place] Streets; Rhinelander's, on the corner of William and Duane Streets, now (1852) Lightbody's Printing-ink Manufactory; and the more emininently historical one on Liberty Street (numbers 34 and 36), a few feet eastward of the Middle Dutch Church, now the Post-office, were the most spacious buildings in the city and answered the purposes of prisons very well. Rhinelander's is the only one remaining, the one on Liberty Street having been demolished in June, 1840, and Van Cortlandt's during the summer of 1852.

But Brooklyn history professor Edwin G. Burrows disagrees, writing in 2008: "Demolition of the Rhinelander Sugar House in 1892 gave rise to stories—completely unsubstantiated—that it had served as a prison during the Revolution." When the building fell into disrepair during the early 19th century, locals believed it to be haunted by ghosts of prisoners from the war. The old warehouse was replaced by the Rhinelander Building, which retained part of the original wall from 1892 to 1968, and continued to receive reports of ghostly sightings in a window. The site is now occupied by the headquarters of the New York City Police Department, near which one of the original barred windows was retained. A section of wall with another window was moved to Van Cortlandt Park in the Bronx, next to the Van Cortlandt House, in 1903.

=== Van Cortlandt's sugar house ===
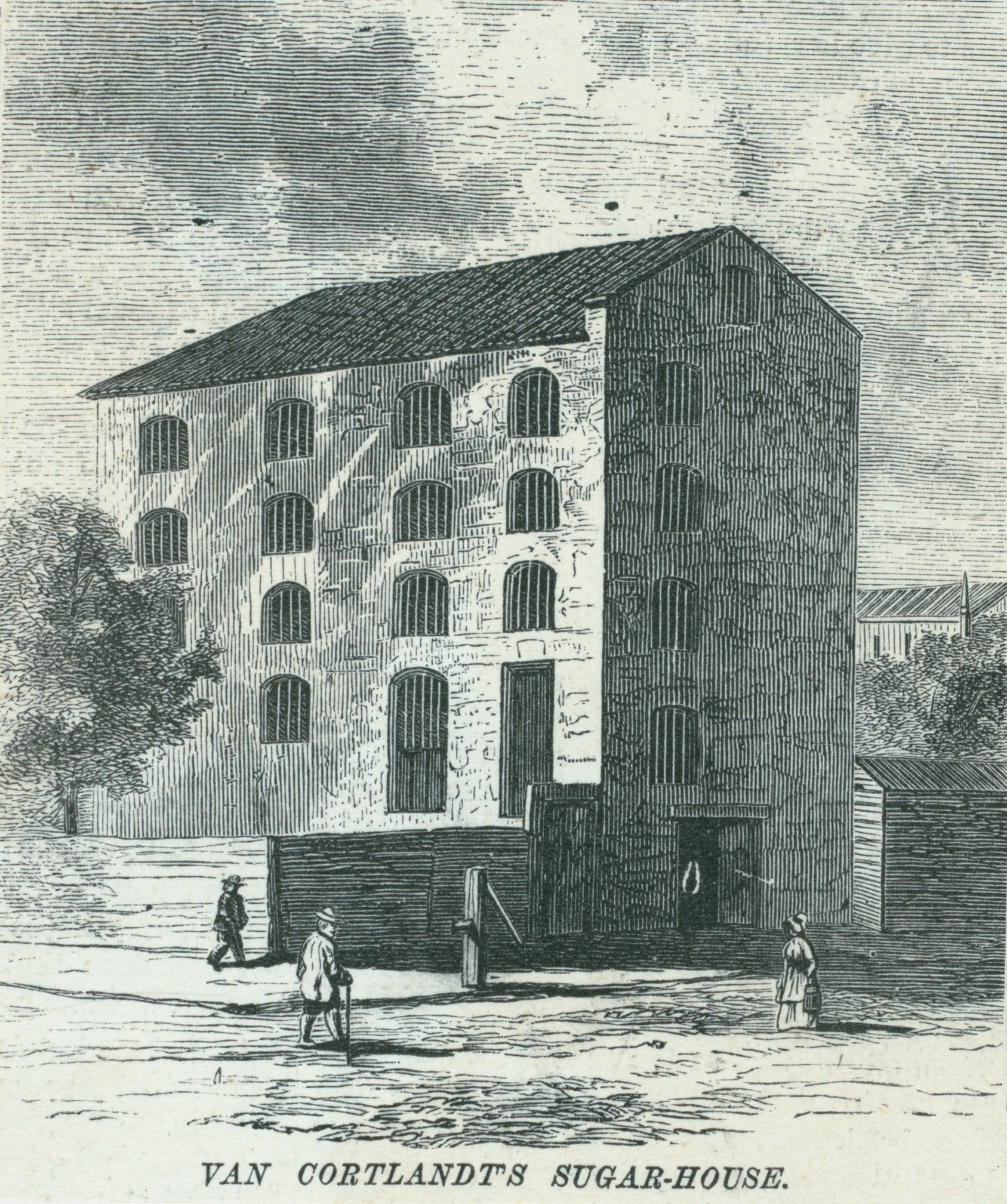
Van Cortlandt's sugar house

The sugar house on the northwest corner of the yard of Trinity Church in Manhattan was built by John Van Cortlandt and partner George Petterson around 1755; Van Cortlandt took sole proprietorship after their partnership was dissolved two years later. Used as a prison during the Revolutionary War, the building was torn down in 1852.

== See also ==
- List of reportedly haunted locations in the United States
- Prison ship
- Prison Ship Martyrs' Monument
- Prisoners in the American Revolutionary War
