= Wisconsin Highway 192 =

Former state highway in Wisconsin, United States

State Trunk Highway 192
- Former WIS 192 highlighted in red

Route information
- Maintained by WisDOT
- Length: 2.6 mi (4.2 km)
- Existed: 1947–1990

Major junctions
- South end: WIS 50 / CTH-C in Pleasant Prairie
- WIS 158 in Kenosha
- North end: WIS 142 / CTH-H near Kenosha

Location
- Country: United States
- State: Wisconsin
- Counties: Kenosha

Highway system
- Wisconsin State Trunk Highway System; Interstate; US; State; Scenic; Rustic
← WIS 191	→ WIS 193

Wisconsin Highway 192 (WIS 192) was a short state highway in Wisconsin. It traveled from WIS 50 to WIS 43 (later WIS 142 to Interstate 43).

== Route description ==
Starting at WIS 50, WIS 192 began to travel northward. Going north to the southeast corner of the Kenosha Regional Airport, it then intersected WIS 158. Going further north, it then ended at WIS 142 (now CTH-S).

== History ==
Starting in 1947, WIS 192 was formed. Initially, it traveled from WIS 50 to WIS 43. During its existence, its routing had not been changed significantly. Meanwhile, in 1974, WIS 43 became WIS 142 due to the creation of I-43. In 1990, the route became decommissioned. Today, it is signed as part of CTH-H.

== Major intersections ==
The entire highway was in Kenosha County.

Location	mi	km	Destinations	Notes
Pleasant Prairie	0.0	0.0	WIS 50 (75th Street) / CTH-C	Southern terminus of WIS 192
Kenosha	1.6	2.6	WIS 158 (52nd Street)	
	2.6	4.2	WIS 142 (39th Street) / CTH-H	Northern terminus of WIS 192
1.000 mi = 1.609 km; 1.000 km = 0.621 mi
