= List of state trunk highways in Wisconsin =

Wisconsin State Trunk Highways
- Highway markers for State Trunk Highway 35 and State Trunk Highway 133

- Map of the Wisconsin highway system

System information
- Notes: Wisconsin Highways are generally state-maintained.

Highway names
- Interstates: Interstate X (I-X)
- US Highways: U.S. Highway X (US X)
- State: (State Trunk) Highway X (STH-X or WIS X)

System links
- Wisconsin State Trunk Highway System; Interstate; US; State; Scenic; Rustic

The organized system of Wisconsin State Trunk Highways (typically abbreviated as STH or WIS), the state highway system for the U.S. state of Wisconsin, was created in 1917. The legislation made Wisconsin the first state to have a standard numbering system for its highways. It was designed to connect every county seat and city with over 5000 residents. The original system numbered the roads starting at 11 and ran up to 199. The 1917 law required the creation of a distinctive state route marker, which was initially an inverted triangle. "...it soon became apparent that (the triangle) served no really useful purpose after the public had become educated to the idea of the numbering. The long vertical axis made it necessary to use a lot of space, much of which was useless." Distinctive route markers were eventually redesigned to use a rounded rectangle for better space usage, but the inverted triangle remains superimposed, as a vestige.

These routes were altered significantly in 1926 when United States Numbered Highways were commissioned. It was altered to include communities with at least 2,500 residents. Further alteration occurred when the Interstate Highway System was commissioned in the state.

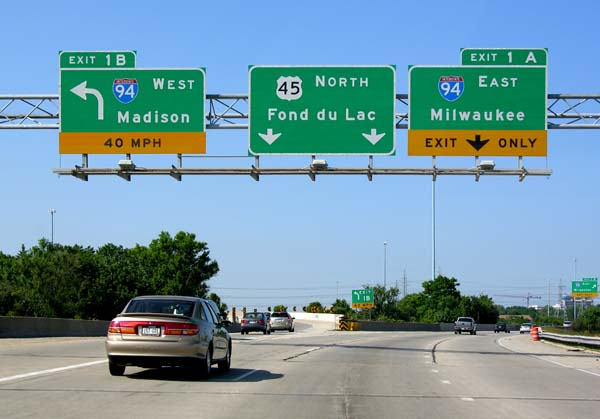
I-894 west at the Zoo Interchange (I-94)

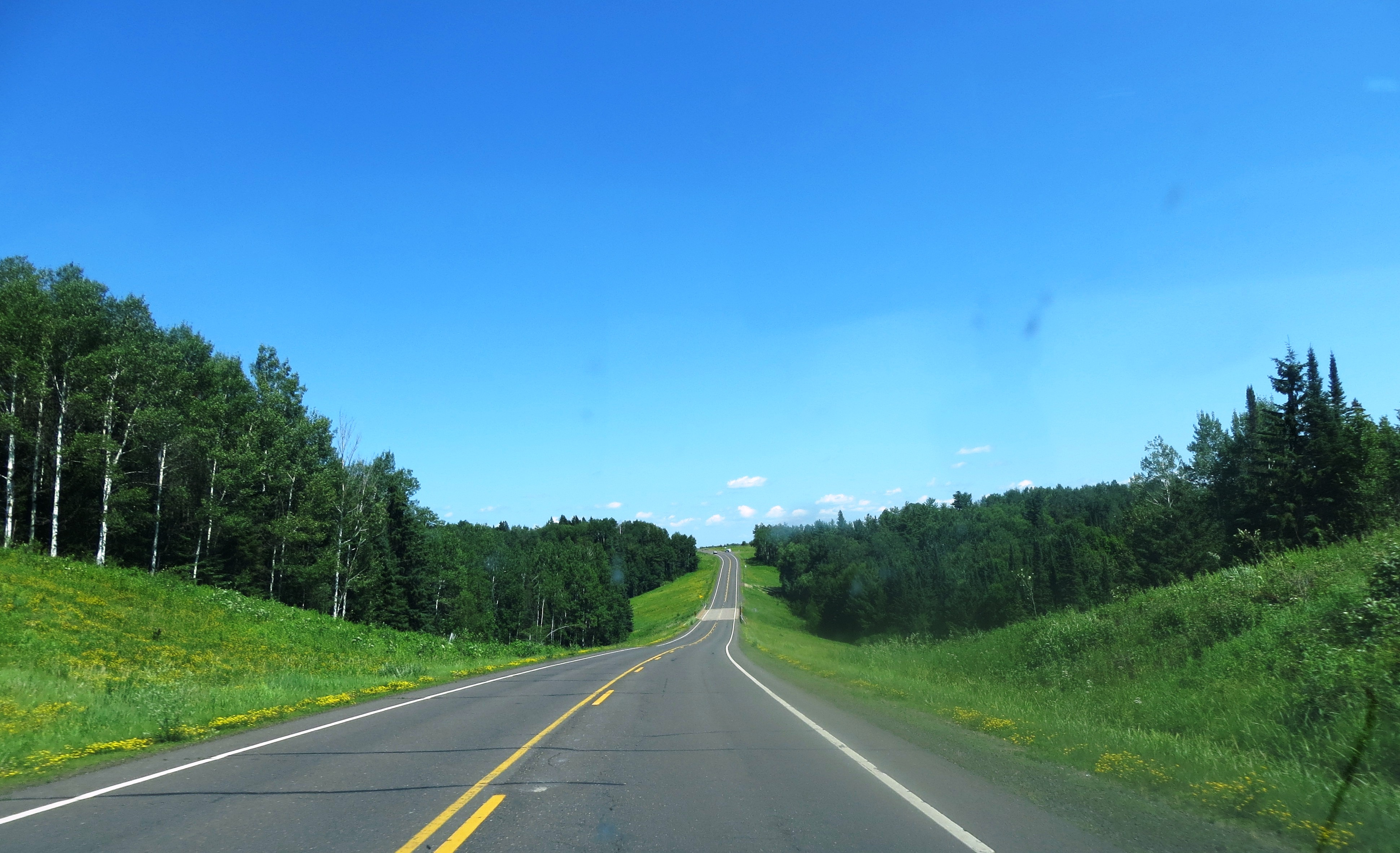
WIS 13 scenery in Douglas County

== Mainline highways ==
Number	Length (mi)	Length (km)	Southern or western terminus	Northern or eastern terminus	Formed	Removed	Notes
WIS 10	316.51	509.37	Illinois state line in Beloit	Minnesota state line in Superior	1917	1926	Replaced by US 2 and US 51; number not reused because of the creation of US 10
WIS 11	—	—	WIS 32 Superior	Minnesota state line in La Crosse	1917	1926	Replaced by US 53, US 61 and WIS 27 (this segment became part of rerouted US 61 in 1932)
WIS 11	—	—	US 18 in Madison	Minnesota state line in La Crosse	1926	1933	Former WIS 41; replaced by US 14
WIS 11	157.56	253.57	US 61/US 151/WIS 35 in Kieler	WIS 32 in Racine	1933	current	Former WIS 20 west of Burlington; renumbered to remove a concurrency with WIS 83
WIS 12	339.40	546.21	Minnesota state line in Hudson	Illinois state line in Genoa City	1917	1926	Replaced by US 12 (also why the number is not reused)
WIS 13	338.32	544.47	I-90/I-94 in Wisconsin Dells	US 2/US 53 in Superior	1917	current	Forms a part of the Lake Superior Circle Tour
WIS 14	198.49	319.44	Minnesota state line in St. Croix Falls	WIS 57 in Pembine	1917	1926	Replaced by US 8
WIS 14	—	—	WIS 15 in Milwaukee	WIS 133 in Cassville	1926	1933	Former WIS 61; split into two and renumbered as WIS 81 and WIS 15 (now I-43) because of the extension of US 14 into Wisconsin.
WIS 15	—	—	Illinois	US 141 in Milwaukee	1917	1931	North of Milwaukee transferred to US 141 (short section in Milwaukee) and US 41 in 1926; replaced by WIS 42 (this section was swapped with WIS 32 in 1951)
WIS 15	—	—	WIS 32 in Milwaukee	US 51 in Beloit	1933	1987	Former WIS 14; replaced by I-43
WIS 15	14.80	23.82	US 45 in New London	I-41 in Appleton	1996	current	Not open until 1998
WIS 16	—	—	WIS 18 (now US 10) near Manitowoc	WIS 11 (now US 53) in Chippewa Falls	1917	1926	Partially replaced by US 141 and rest renumbered WIS 29 because of the creation of US 16
WIS 16	193.2	310.9	US 14/US 61/MN 16 in La Crosse	I-94 in Waukesha	1978	current	Previously US 16
WIS 17	85.63	137.81	US 10 in Manitowoc	WIS 78 in Sister Bay	1917	1932	Section from Manitowoc to Milwaukee transferred to US 141 in 1926; remainder replaced by WIS 42
WIS 17	85.63	137.81	WIS 64 in Merrill	FFH-16 in Phelps	1934	current	
WIS 18	182.16	293.16	Minnesota	WIS 17 (now WIS 42) in Manitowoc	1917	1926	Replaced by US 10 and rest renumbered WIS 34 because of the creation of US 18
WIS 19	59.37	95.55	US 14/WIS 78 in Mazomanie	WIS 16 in Watertown	1917	current	West of Madison replaced by US 18 in 1926; truncated to current ends in 1947 (section east of Watertown already part of US 16 (now WIS 16) and section west of Mazomanie already part with US 151)
WIS 20	42.95	69.12	US 12/WIS 67 in LaGrange	WIS 32 in Racine	1917	current	
WIS 21	123.37	198.54	WIS 16/WIS 27/WIS 71 in Sparta	US 45 in Oshkosh	1917	current	
WIS 22	172.18	277.10	US 51/WIS 60 in Arlington	US 41 in Oconto	1917	current	
WIS 23	211.05	339.65	WIS 11 & CTH-P in Shullsburg	WIS 28/WIS 42 in Sheboygan	1917	current	Originally went southwest via current US 151 before 1926 instead of south
WIS 24	7.88	12.68	US 2 in Ashland	WIS 27 in Hayward	1917	1934	Replaced by US 63
WIS 24	7.88	12.68	CTH-P in Hales Corners	WIS 241 in Milwaukee	1947	current	Originally ended in East Troy at WIS 20
WIS 25	85.81	138.10	MN 60 in Nelson	WIS 48 in Rice Lake	1917	current	
WIS 26	98.15	157.96	US 51 in Janesville	US 41 & CTH-N in Oshkosh	1917	current	Section north of Oshkosh replaced by US 45 in 1934
WIS 27	294.08	473.28	US 18/WIS 60 in Prairie du Chien	US 2 in Brule	1917	current	Originally went west on current WIS 77 to Minnesota
WIS 28	—	—	Iowa state line near Dubuque, IA	WIS 33 in Reedsburg	1917	1923	Replaced by WIS 23 (part was later US 118, now this part is a section of US 151)
WIS 28	59.77	96.19	WIS 33 in Horicon	WIS 23/WIS 42 in Sheboygan	1923	current	
WIS 29	—	—	Minnesota state line	WIS 26 near Watertown	1917	1926	Replaced by US 16; now WIS 16
WIS 29	307.35	494.63	US 10/WIS 35 in Prescott	WIS 42 in Kewaunee	1926	current	Former WIS 16, WIS 116, and WIS 146
WIS 30	—	—	WIS 11 (now US 14) in Readstown	WIS 23 (now US 151) in Dickeyville	1917	1923	Replaced by WIS 11 (now US 61)
WIS 30	3.43	5.52	US 151 in Madison	I-39/I-90/I-94 in Madison	1923	current	Formerly continued east to Milwaukee via what is now I-94
WIS 31	—	—	US 10 in Manitowoc	US 45 in Fond du Lac	1917	1934	Section south of Fond du Lac replaced by WIS 69 and US 151 in 1926. Rest replaced by US 151 in 1934.
WIS 31	22.86	36.79	IL 131 in Pleasant Prairie	WIS 32 in Caledonia	1936	current	
WIS 32	325.69	524.15	IL 137 in Pleasant Prairie	US 45 at Land O' Lakes	1917	current	32nd Division Memorial Highway; swapped with WIS 42 south of Howards Grove in 1951; until 1989, followed CTH-PP, CTH-W, and CTH-67 from De Pere to Kiel
WIS 33	200.84	323.22	US 14/US 61 in La Crosse	WIS 32 in Port Washington	1917	current	
WIS 34	—	—	Minnesota state line	WIS 35 in Mondovi	1917	1923	Replaced by WIS 18 (Renumbered WIS 34 (a reference to this designation) in 1926 because of US 18, and became part of rerouted US 10 in 1934)
WIS 34	—	—	WIS 49 in Berlin	WIS 95 (now US 45/old WIS 110) in Butte des Morts	1923	1926	Renumbered WIS 116
WIS 34	—	—	Minnesota state line	US 12 in Fairchild	1926	1934	Former WIS 18; became part of rerouted US 10
WIS 34	22.86	36.79	WIS 13/WIS 73 in Wisconsin Rapids	I-39US 51 in Knowlton	1934	current	Former WIS 45
WIS 35	412.15	663.29	IL 35 in Jamestown	I-535/US 53 in Superior	1917	current	South of Kieler replaced by US 61 in 1926.
WIS 36	35.89	57.76	WIS 120 in Springfield	WIS 241 in Milwaukee	1917	current	
WIS 37	42.67	68.67	WIS 35 in Alma	US 12 in Eau Claire	1917	current	
WIS 38	—	—	WIS 15 in Abrams	Michigan state line north of Niagara	1917	1923	Replaced by WIS 57 (this section became part of US 141 in 1929)
WIS 38	25.33	40.76	WIS 32 in Racine	WIS 59 in Milwaukee	1923	current	
WIS 39	43.02	69.23	WIS 15 (now US 41) in Oshkosh	WIS 10 (now US 51) in Woodruff	1917	1923	Replaced by WIS 26 (now US 45) and WIS 47
WIS 39	43.02	69.23	US 18 in Edmund	WIS 69 in New Glarus	1923	current	Until 1999, continued east to Albany via what is now CTH-F
WIS 40	81.56	131.26	US 12/WIS 29 in Elk Mound	WIS 27/WIS 70 in Radisson	1917	current	
WIS 41	144.00	231.75	Milwaukee	WIS 11 in Readstown	1917	1926	Replaced by US 18 and rest renumbered WIS 11 (now US 14) because of the creation of US 41
WIS 42	137.76	221.70	WIS 19 (now US 18) in Verona	Illinois state line	1917	1923	Replaced by WIS 31 (this section renumbered WIS 69 in 1926)
WIS 42	137.76	221.70	WIS 23/W 28 in Sheboygan	Northport	1923	current	
WIS 43	—	—	WIS 16 (now WIS 29) in Cadott	WIS 70 in Radisson	1917	1923	Replaced by WIS 27 (which has since been realigned to the east)
WIS 43	—	—	WIS 11 in Burlington	WIS 32 in Kenosha	1923	1974	Renumbered WIS 142 because of the creation of I-43
WIS 44	63.86	102.77	WIS 22 in Pardeeville	US 45 in Oshkosh	1917	current	
WIS 45	—	—	Minnesota state line at Red Wing	WIS 12 (now US 12) in Hudson	1917	1923	Replaced by WIS 35 (part now WIS 65 and US 63)
WIS 45	—	—	WIS 13/WIS 73 in Wisconsin Rapids	US 51 in Knowlton	1923	1934	Renumbered WIS 34 because of the extension of US 45 into Wisconsin
WIS 46	34.13	54.93	US 63/WIS 64 in Deer Park	WIS 35 in Milltown	1917	current	Section south of Deer Park became part of US 63 in 1934
WIS 47	188.01	302.57	WIS 114 in Menasha	US 51/WIS 182 in Manitowish	1917	current	
WIS 48	—	—	WIS 57 (now CTH-J) in New Holstein	WIS 23/WIS 26 in Sheboygan	1917	1923	Replaced by WIS 32 (section south of Howards Grove now WIS 42)
WIS 48	98.19	158.02	WIS 70/WIS 87 in Grantsburg	WIS 40 in Exeland	1923	current	
WIS 49	127.52	205.22	US 41 & CTH-KK in Lomira	WIS 29 in Elderon	1917	current	
WIS 50	44.43	71.50	WIS 11 in Delavan	WIS 32 in Kenosha	1917	current	
WIS 51	—	—	WIS 10 (now US 10) Turtle Lake	WIS 11 (later US 53; now WIS 253) in Spooner	1917	1923	Replaced by WIS 24 (now US 63)
WIS 51	—	—	WIS 46 (now US 63) in Ellsworth	WIS 25 in Downsville	1923	1926	Renumbered WIS 72 because of the creation of US 51
WIS 52	—	—	WIS 11 (now US 53) in Galesville	WIS 12 (now US 12) in Black River Falls	1917	1923	Replaced by WIS 54
WIS 52	74.91	120.56	US 51/WIS 29 in Wausau	WIS 32 in Wabeno	1923	current	
WIS 53	45.80	73.71	WIS 35 in Fountain City	WIS 73 in Neillsville	1917	1926	Renumbered WIS 95 (one part later WIS 121) because of the creation of US 53
WIS 54	243.12	391.26	MN 43 in Fountain City	WIS 42 in Algoma	1917	current	
WIS 55	175.55	282.52	US 151 in Brothertown	M-73 in Nelma	1917	current	One section transferred to WIS 165 (now supplanted by realigned US 41/US 45) in 1926, sections concurrent with US 45 and US 151 in 1934; concurrency with US 45 eliminated in 1953, when the section south of the concurrency was renumbered WIS 145; concurrency with US 151 eliminated in 1965.
WIS 56	—	—	WIS 15 (now US 41/US 45) in Fond du Lac	WIS 17 (now WIS 42) in Manitowoc	1917	1923	Replaced by WIS 31 (now US 151)
WIS 56	50.56	81.37	WIS 35 in Genoa	WIS 80 in Richland Center	1923	current	
WIS 57	191.82	308.70	WIS 59 in Milwaukee	WIS 42 in Sister Bay	1917	current	South of Milwaukee replaced by US 41 in 1926 and original alignment north of Green Bay replaced by US 141 in 1929; rerouted northeast to Sister Bay.
WIS 58	53.92	86.78	US 14 in Richland Center	WIS 80 in Necedah	1917	current	
WIS 59	116.21	187.02	WIS 11/WIS 81 in Monroe	WIS 32 in Milwaukee	1917	current	
WIS 60	185.08	297.86	US 18 in Prairie du Chien	I-43/WIS 32/WS 57 in Grafton	1917	current	
WIS 61	—	—	WIS 15 (became part of WIS 42 in 1933, and this section was swapped with WIS 32 in 1951) in Milwaukee	WIS 133 in Cassville	1918	1926	Renumbered WIS 14 because of the creation of US 61, but split into two and renumbered as WIS 81 and WIS 15 (now I-43) because of the extension of US 14 into Wisconsin
WIS 62	—	—	US 18 in Edmund	WIS 11 in Shullsburg	1917	1938	Replaced by WIS 39 and WIS 23
WIS 62	4.5	7.2	WIS 32 in Milwaukee	WIS 32 in Milwaukee	1942	1999	Portion from Howard Avenue to Oklahoma Avenue now part of WIS 32; rest now Kinnickinnic Avenue, Plankinton Avenue, and Packard Avenue
WIS 63	—	—	WIS 64 in Merrill	WIS 70 in Eagle River	1917	1934	Renumbered WIS 17 because of the extension of US 63 into Wisconsin
WIS 64	275.65	443.62	MN 36 in Houlton	US 41 in Marinette	1917	current	
WIS 65	—	—	WIS 12 (now US 12) in Baraboo	WIS 10 (now US 51) in Portage	1917	1919	Replaced by WIS 33
WIS 65	—	—	WIS 19 (now US 18) in Patch Grove	WIS 20 (now WIS 11)/ WIS 42 (now later WIS 31, now WIS 69) Monroe	1919	1923	Replaced by WIS 35 and WIS 61 (later WIS 14, now WIS 81)
WIS 65	54.12	87.10	US 10/US 63 in Ellsworth	US 8 in St. Croix Falls	1923	current	
WIS 66	18.73	30.14	WIS 34 in Wisconsin Rapids	WIS 49 in Rosholt	1917	current	Until 1923, continued north to Wittenberg
WIS 67	—	—	WIS 48 (now WIS 32) in New Holstein	WIS 23 in Plymouth	1917	1921	Replaced by WIS 57; now CTH-J (WIS 57 was moved off of this road in 1923) and current WIS 67
WIS 67	160.11	257.67	IL 75 in Beloit	US 151 in Valders	1921	current	
WIS 68	9.51	15.30	WIS 33 in Fox Lake	WIS 17 (now WIS 32) in Port Washington	1917	1930	Replaced by WIS 33; WIS 68 reassigned to the old route of WIS 33
WIS 68	9.51	15.30	WIS 33 in Fox Lake	WIS 49 in Waupun	1930	current	
WIS 69	—	—	Michigan state line	Michigan state line	1917	1926	Replaced by US 2
WIS 69	40.78	65.63	IL 26 at Monroe	US 18/US 151 in Verona	1926	current	Former portion of WIS 31
WIS 70	246.49	396.69	MN 70 at Grantsburg	US 2/US 141 & WIS 101 in Florence	1917	current	
WIS 71	53.55	86.18	WIS 54/WIS 108 in Melrose	WIS 80/WIS 82 in Elroy	1917	current	
WIS 72	—	—	WIS 20 in Burlington	WIS 50 in New Munster	1917	1923	Replaced by WIS 83
WIS 72	—	—	west of Eagle River	Plum Lake	1923	1926	Renumbered WIS 155
WIS 72	29.44	47.38	US 10/US 63 in Ellsworth	WIS 25 in Downsville	1926	current	Former WIS 51
WIS 73	—	—	WIS 15 (now WIS 96) in Kaukauna	WIS 18 (now WIS 114) in Sherwood	1917	1921	Removed from system; later became part of WIS 55
WIS 73	265.84	427.83	I-39/I-90/US 51 in Albion	US 8 in Ingram	1921	current	
WIS 74	11.68	18.80	WIS 190 in Pewaukee	US 41/US 45/WIS 100 in Menomonee Falls	1917	2015	Replaced by extension of CTH-F and local roads; formerly ended at WIS 83 in North Lake; this section became CTH-VV in 1984, and the highway was extended south to WIS 190 in 1999.
WIS 75	—	—	WIS 36 in Franklin	WIS 50 near Bristol	1917	1934	Replaced by US 45
WIS 75	12.10	19.47	WIS 50/WIS 83 in Paddock Lake	WIS 20 in Waterford	1934	2024	Now CTH-BD
WIS 76	—	—	WIS 54 in Casco	WIS 17 (now WIS 42) near Rostok	1917	1923	Now CTH-E and CTH-O
WIS 76	43.40	69.85	US 45 in Oshkosh	US 45/WIS 22 in Bear Creek	1923	current	
WIS 77	—	—	Silver Spring Drive in Milwaukee	WIS 19 (now US 18) in Milwaukee	1917	1921	Replaced by WIS 57
WIS 77	139.94	225.21	MN 48 at Danbury	Bus. US 2 at Hurley	1921	current	
WIS 78	—	—	Green Bay	WIS 15 (became part of US 41 in 1926; this section is now WIS 175) east of Hartford	1917	1921	Replaced by WIS 29 (this section became part of WIS 60 in 1923)
WIS 78	—	—	Green Bay	WIS 17 (now WIS 42) in Sister Bay	1921	1930	Replaced by WIS 57
WIS 78	92.83	149.40	IL 78 in Gratiot	I-39/I-90/I-94 in Portage	1931	current	
WIS 79	17.63	28.37	US 12 in Menomonie	WIS 64 in Connorsville	1918	current	In 1923, section from Ellsworth to Martell became part of WIS 46 (now US 63), Martell to Spring Valley became part of WIS 116 (now WIS 29), and Spring Valley to Glenwood City was given to the county (but later became WIS 128) in exchange for rerouting southeast to Menomonie; rerouted to bypass Glenwood City in 1947
WIS 80	163.23	262.69	IL 84 in Hazel Green	US 10 in Marshfield	1918	current	
WIS 81	—	—	Illinois	WIS 33 near Portage	1919	1931	Renumbered WIS 78 to match Illinois
WIS 81	123.81	199.25	WIS 133 in Cassville	I-39/I-90 & I-43 in Beloit	1933	current	
WIS 82	116.15	186.93	Iowa 9 at Lansing, IA	I-39/US 51/WIS 23 in Oxford	1919	current	
WIS 83	74.52	119.93	IL 83 in Salem Lakes	WIS 60 in Hartford	1919	current	Formerly ended at WIS 175 until it was truncated in 2021.
WIS 84	—	—	Osseo	Brockway	1919	1923	Replaced by WIS 27 (now CTH-A and CTH-FF)
WIS 84	18.60	29.93	WIS 32 in Port Washington	WIS 28/WIS 144 in Boltonville	1923	1997	Now CTH-H, CTH-XX, and CTH-X
WIS 85	23.48	37.79	US 10/WIS 25 in Durand	WIS 37 in Eau Claire	1919	current	
WIS 86	—	—	Withee	Neillsville	1919	1923	Replaced by WIS 73
WIS 86	32.32	52.01	WIS 13 in Ogema	US 51 & CTH-D in Tomahawk	1923	current	
WIS 87	—	—	Alban	Waupaca	1919	1923	Replaced by WIS 49
WIS 87	25.82	41.55	US 8 in St. Croix Falls	WIS 48/WIS 70 in Grantsburg	1923	current	
WIS 88	29.75	47.88	WIS 35 in Fountain City	WIS 37 in Mondovi	1919	current	Until 1923, ran from west of Gilmanton to Elk Creek via what is now CTH-B, current route, and WIS 121
WIS 89	56.55	91.01	US 14/WIS 11 in Darien	WIS 73 in Columbus	1919	current	Section south of Darien became part of US 14 in 1932
WIS 90	10.40	16.74	WIS 16 in Ixonia	WIS 59 in Palmyra	1919	1957	Renumbered WIS 135 because of the creation of I-90, but WIS 135 was eliminated in 1990 and is now CTH-F and CTH-E
WIS 91	—	—	Ripon	Oshkosh	1919	1923	Replaced by WIS 44
WIS 91	—	—	US 8 west of Bradley	US 51 in Merrill	1923	1937	Section south of Tomahawk removed 1934; now CTH-CC (south of Tomahawk became part of WIS 107 in 1947)
WIS 91	—	—	US 8 near Bradley	US 51 (now CTH-A) north of Tomahawk	1937	1986	Decommissioned when the US 51 Tomahawk bypass was completed; now CTH-U
WIS 91	18.83	30.30	WIS 49 in Berlin	US 41/WIS 44 in Oshkosh	1996	current	
WIS 92	30.68	49.37	Waukesha	Sussex	1919	1923	Renumbered WIS 164
WIS 92	30.68	49.37	US 14 in Brooklyn	WIS 78 in Mount Horeb	1923	current	Section from Brooklyn to Janesville replaced by US 14 in 1932
WIS 93	68.00	109.44	US 53/WIS 35 in Holmen	US 53 in Eau Claire	1919	current	
WIS 94	—	—	US 12 in Camp Douglas	Hustler	1919	1957	Renumbered WIS 185 because of the creation of I-94, but that has since been eliminated; continued south to Union Center until 1923
WIS 95	—	—	Oshkosh	Fremont	1919	1926	Replaced by US 110; now WIS 110 (which replaced US 110 in 1938), CTH-II, US 45, and CTH-S
WIS 95	73.76	118.71	WIS 35 in Fountain City	WIS 73 in Neillsville	1926	current	
WIS 96	55.94	90.03	US 10/WIS 110 in Fremont	I-43 & CTH-KB in Denmark	1919	current	
WIS 97	36.11	58.11	WIS 13 in Marshfield	WIS 64 in Goodrich	1919	current	
WIS 98	—	—	Michigan state line	WIS 32 in Argonne	1919	1923	Replaced by WIS 55
WIS 98	16.20	26.07	WIS 73 in Greenwood	WIS 13 in Spencer	1923	current	
WIS 99	8.3	13.4	WIS 67 near Eagle	WIS 83 in Mukwonago	1919	1999	Now CTH-LO
WIS 100	—	—	WIS 10/WIS 20/WIS 26 in Janesville	WIS 10 in Oregon	1919	1923	Replaced by WIS 73 and WIS 106
WIS 100	39.69	63.87	WIS 32 in Oak Creek	I-43/WIS 32 in Bayside	1923	current	
WIS 101	—	—	WIS 35 in De Soto	WIS 27 in West Prairie	1919	1923	Replaced by WIS 82
WIS 101	23.54	37.88	US 8 in Armstrong Creek	US 2/US 141 & WIS 70 in Florence	1923	current	
WIS 102	—	—	WIS 33 in Ontario	WIS 21 (now CTH-A) in Ridgeville	1919	1923	Replaced by CTH-M (part later WIS 131)
WIS 102	18.25	29.37	WIS 13 in Chelsea	WIS 86 in Spirit	1923	current	
WIS 103	—	—	WIS 49 south of Brandon	US 151 near Lamartine	1919	1994	Now CTH-TC
WIS 104	15.36	24.72	WIS 11 in Brodhead	WIS 92 in Brooklyn	1919	current	
WIS 105	—	—	Cassville	WIS 65 (now WIS 35) near Beetown	1919	1923	Replaced by WIS 61 (later WIS 14, now WIS 81)
WIS 105	4.72	7.60	MN 39 in Oliver	WIS 35 in Superior	1923	current	
WIS 106	19.08	30.71	WIS 73 in Albion	WIS 59 in Palmyra	1919	current	
WIS 107	—	—	Jefferson	Columbus	1919	1923	Replaced by WIS 89 south of Waterloo, with the section north of Waterloo decommissioned entirely (now also part of WIS 89)
WIS 107	56.23	90.49	WIS 153 in Mosinee	CTH-S in Tomahawk	1923	current	
WIS 108	19.08	30.71	WIS 16 in West Salem	WIS 54/WIS 71 in Melrose	1919	current	
WIS 109	—	—	WIS 11 (now US 53) in Blair	WIS 84 (later WIS 27, now CTH-A) in Hixton	1919	1923	Replaced by WIS 95
WIS 109	19.24	30.96	WIS 19 in Watertown	WIS 67 near Woodland	1923	1998	Now CTH-R
WIS 110	—	—	Waterloo	Waterloo	1919	1921	Replaced by an extended WIS 107
WIS 110	—	—	Benoit	south of Barksdale	1923	1926	Replaced by an extended WIS 112 because of the creation of US 110
WIS 110	37.44	60.25	US 10/WIS 96 in Fremont	US 45 in Marion	1938	current	Former US 110; extended over WIS 142 in 1960
WIS 111	10.61	17.08	US 8 in Catawba	WIS 13 in Phillips	1919	current	
WIS 112	12.58	20.25	WIS 13 in Marengo	WIS 137 in Ashland	1919	current	West end was at US 63; extended over WIS 110 to Benoit in 1926; swapped with WIS 118 south of Ashland in 1971
WIS 113	—	—	WIS 16 (later WIS 29; now CTH-X) in Thorp	WIS 64	1919	1923	Replaced by an extended WIS 73
WIS 113	40.34	64.92	US 151 in Madison	WIS 33 in Baraboo	1923	current	
WIS 114	21.03	33.84	US 41 in Neenah	WIS 32/WIS 57 in Hilbert	1919	current	
WIS 115	—	—	US 41 in Muscoda	Richland Center	1919	1923	Replaced by WIS 80
WIS 115	—	—	WIS 15 in Ackerville	WIS 15 in Germantown	1923	1925	Replaced by WIS 15 (now US 41)
WIS 115	5.80	9.33	WIS 60 near Hustisford	WIS 26 in Juneau	1926	2005	Former WIS 118; Now CTH-DJ
WIS 116	—	—	WIS 60 near Salem	Illinois state line	1919	1923	Replaced by WIS 83
WIS 116	—	—	Chippewa Falls	Prescott	1923	1926	Replaced by WIS 29
WIS 116	14.19	22.84	WIS 91 in Waukau	US 45 in Butte des Morts	1926	current	Former WIS 34
WIS 117	—	—	WIS 20 (now WIS 11) in Gratiot	Illinois state line	1919	1923	Replaced by WIS 81 (now WIS 78)
WIS 117	5.79	9.32	WIS 29/WIS 47/WIS 55 in Bonduel	WIS 22 in Cecil	1923	current	
WIS 118	—	—	west of Hustisford	Juneau	1919	1926	Renumbered WIS 115 because of the creation of US 118
WIS 118	6.86	11.04	US 63 in Benoit	WIS 112 in Ashland	1939	current	
WIS 119	—	—	WIS 29 (now WIS 60) in Hartford	WIS 15 (later US 41, now WIS 175)	1919	1923	Replaced by WIS 83
WIS 119	—	—	WIS 19 (later also US 16) in Pewaukee	Milwaukee	1923	1930	Replaced by US 16; Spur on Lisbon Ave decommissioned
WIS 119	—	—	US 10 in Manitowoc	WIS 42 in Manitowoc	1931	1956	Replaced by US 141 (now CTH-R)
WIS 119	—	—	US 41 in Green Bay	US 141 in Green Bay	1968	1969	Replaced by Business US 41 (deleted 1998)
WIS 119	1.89	3.04	I-94/US 41 in Milwaukee	WIS 38 in Milwaukee	1978	current	Milwaukee Airport Spur
WIS 120	—	—	WIS 56 (now US 151) in Brothertown	WIS 114 in Sherwood	1919	1923	Replaced by WIS 55
WIS 120	—	—	WIS 20 in Burlington	Racine	1923	1933	Replaced by WIS 11
WIS 120	21.34	34.34	IL 47 in Genoa City	I-43 in East Troy	1934	current	
WIS 121	—	—	WIS 29 (now CTH-XX) in Briggsville	WIS 10 (later US 51, now CTH-CX) near Endeavor	1919	1923	Replaced by WIS 23
WIS 121	45.07	72.53	WIS 88 in Gilmanton	WIS 95 in Alma Center	1923	current	
WIS 122	—	—	WIS 18 (now US 10) near Appleton	WIS 39 (later WIS 26, later US 45, now WIS 15 and WIS 76) in Greenville	1919	1923	Replaced by WIS 76
WIS 122	14.69	23.64	WIS 77 in Upson	CR 505 at Saxon	1923	current	
WIS 123	3.00	4.83	CTH-DL at Devil's Lake State Park	WIS 33/WIS 113 in Baraboo	1919	2016	Now CTH-DL
WIS 124	—	—	WIS 24 (now US 63) in Hayward	WIS 11 (later US 53, now Bus. US 53) in Minong	1919	1923	Replaced by WIS 27
WIS 124	17.59	28.31	US 53 in Lake Hallie	WIS 64 in Eagleton	1923	current	
WIS 125	—	—	US 41 in Ashland Junction	WIS 10 (later US 2; now CTH-G)	1920	1925	Replaced by WIS 112
WIS 125	2.62	4.22	US 41 in Appleton	WIS 47 in Appleton	1926	current	College Avenue; prior to 1953, followed Prospect Avenue instead
WIS 126	5.70	9.17	WIS 81 in Belmont	US 151 & CTH-G in Belmont	1923	current	
WIS 127	14.16	22.79	WIS 16 near Wisconsin Dells	I-39/WIS 16 in Portage	1923	current	
WIS 128	27.04	43.52	WIS 72 in Elmwood	WIS 64 in Forest	1923	current	
WIS 129	—	—	US 61/WIS 35 in Tennyson	Potosi Station	1920	1947	Replaced by WIS 133
WIS 129	2.69	4.33	US 61/WIS 35/WIS 81 in Lancaster	US 61 in Lancaster	1959	current	
WIS 130	31.40	50.53	WIS 23 in Dodgeville	WIS 154 in Hill Point	1923	current	
WIS 131	78.9	127.0	WIS 60 in Wauzeka	US 12/WIS 16 in Tomah	1923	current	
WIS 132	—	—	US 18	Mount Hope	1923	1992	Now CTH-J
WIS 133	91.07	146.56	US 61/WIS 35 in Potosi	US 14/WIS 60/WIS 130 in Lone Rock	1923	current	
WIS 134	2.85	4.59	US 12/US 18 in Cambridge	CTH-O in London	1923	current	
WIS 135	—	—	US 51 in Packwaukee	WIS 13	1923	1955	Replaced by WIS 82; old route to Wisconsin Dells replaced by CTH-G and by WIS 23 in exchange for route to north of WIS 13 in 1947
WIS 135	10.40	16.74	WIS 16 in Ixonia	US 18 in Sullivan	1957	1990	Now CTH-F
WIS 136	—	—	US 12 in Prairie du Sac	WIS 33 in North Freedom	1923	1934	Now CTH-PF; number reused on old route of WIS 33
WIS 136	19.05	30.66	WIS 23/WIS 33 in Reedsburg	CTH-DL and Park Road at the entrance of Devil's Lake in Baraboo	1934	current	Original east end was at US 12 in Baraboo
WIS 137	—	—	WIS 39 near Mineral Point	US 118 (now US 151) near Mineral Point	1923	1934	Now CTH-D
WIS 137	—	—	WIS 80	WIS 130 near Lone Rock	1934	1968	Replaced by WIS 133
WIS 137	6.25	10.06	US 2 in Moquah	WIS 13 in Ashland	1971	current	
WIS 138	13.23	21.29	WIS 59 in Cooksville	US 14 in Oregon	1923	current	
WIS 139	24.83	39.96	US 8 in Cavour	M-189 at Tipler	1923	current	
WIS 140	11.58	18.64	IL 76 in Clinton	US 14/WIS 11 in Avalon	1923	current	
WIS 141	—	—	WIS 29 (now WIS 16) in Fall River	WIS 33 in Cambria	1923	1926	Renumbered WIS 146 because of the creation of US 141
WIS 142	—	—	US 12 in Tomah	WIS 71 in Wilton	1923	1948	Replaced by WIS 131
WIS 142	—	—	US 45 in Marion	US 10 in Weyauwega	1953	1960	Former WIS 145; replaced by WIS 110
WIS 142	17.69	28.47	WIS 11/WIS 36/WIS 83 in Burlington	I-41/I-94 & CTH-S in Kenosha	1974	current	Section from I-94 to WIS 32 was decommissioned in 1992.
WIS 143	7.5	12.1	US 45 in West Bend	Cedarburg	1923	1997	Now county highways
WIS 144	28.63	46.08	WIS 175 in Slinger	WIS 57 in Random Lake	—	—	
WIS 145	—	—	WIS 22 north of Weyauwega	US 10 in Weyauwega	—	1953	Renumbered WIS 142 (now part of WIS 110)
WIS 145	24.7	39.8	US 18 in Milwaukee	WIS 175 in Richfield	1953	current	Former portion of WIS 55
WIS 146	—	—	Kewaunee	Bellevue	1923	1926	Replaced by WIS 29
WIS 146	13.22	21.28	WIS 16 in Fall River	WIS 33 in Cambria	1926	current	Former WIS 141
WIS 147	15.09	24.29	WIS 42 in Two Rivers	I-43 & CTH-Z in Maribel	1923	current	
WIS 148	5.7	9.2	US 151 in Valders	US 10 in Cato	1923	1985	Now CTH-J
WIS 149	40.1	64.5	US 151 in Peebles	WIS 32/WIS 57 in Kiel	1923	2006	Now CTH-WH, CTH-G, and CTH-HH; originally continued east to Lake Michigan via what is now CTH-XX
WIS 150	6.6	10.6	WIS 110 west of Winchester	US 45 west of Neenah	1923	2003	Decommissioned when the new US 45 freeway opened to traffic
WIS 151	—	—	Neenah	Appleton	1923	1926	Renumbered WIS 125 because of the creation of US 151
WIS 152	—	—	Minnesota state line	WIS 35 in Danbury	1923	1951	Replaced by WIS 77
WIS 152	7.22	11.62	WIS 21/WIS 73 in Wautoma	CTH-G & CTH-W in Mt. Morris	1956	current	
WIS 153	61.25	98.57	WIS 13 in Spencer	US 45 in Tigerton	1923	current	
WIS 154	22.54	36.27	WIS 58 in Loyd	WIS 136 in Rock Springs	1923	current	
WIS 155	6.94	11.17	WIS 15/WIS 55 south of Jackson	WIS 55 (Fond du Lac Avenue)	1923	1926	Replaced by WIS 55 (now WIS 145)
WIS 155	6.94	11.17	WIS 70 in St. Germain	CTH-N in Sayner	1926	current	
WIS 156	28.35	45.62	WIS 22 in Clintonville	WIS 29/WIS 32 in Pittsfield	1923	current	
WIS 157	6.94	11.17	WIS 23/WIS 55 in Briggsville	WIS 29 (later US 16, now WIS 16) near Briggsville	1923	1924	Replaced by WIS 23 (now CTH-AA)
WIS 157	6.94	11.17	WIS 32/WIS 32 near Suring	US 141	1926	1934	Now CTH-M
WIS 157	2.81	4.52	WIS 35 in Onalaska	WIS 16 in La Crosse	1938	current	
WIS 158	7.36	11.84	US 141 in Crivitz	WIS 64 in Harmony	1923	1948	Now CTH-W
WIS 158	6.70	10.78	I-41/I-94 in Kenosha	WIS 32 in Kenosha	1958	current	
WIS 159	1.6	2.6	US 12 in Baraboo	CTH-DL and Park Road at the entrance of Devil's Lake in Baraboo	1923	2017	Now WIS 136. Until 2016 the road ended at WIS 123, but was extended east when WIS 123 was decommissioned.
WIS 160	3.44	5.54	WIS 29/WIS 55 in Angelica	WIS 32 in Pulaski	1923	current	
WIS 161	22.42	36.08	CTH-SS in Amherst Junction	WIS 22/WIS 110 in Symco	1923	current	
WIS 162	46.03	74.08	WIS 35 in Stoddard	WIS 71 in Four Corners	1923	current	
WIS 163	23.8	38.3	Mishicot	Luxemburg	1923	1999	Now CTH-B and CTH-AB
WIS 164	43.54	70.07	WIS 36 in Waterford	WIS 60 in Slinger	1924	current	
WIS 165	—	—	US 41	WIS 55 in Germantown	1926	1953	Former WIS 55; decommissioned when US 41 freeway was built; now Goldendale Road and Hilltop Drive
WIS 165	7.14	11.49	I-41/I-94 & CTH-Q in Pleasant Prairie	WIS 32 in Pleasant Prairie	1990	current	Formerly CTH-Q
WIS 166	2.1	3.4	WIS 74 in Menomonee Falls	WIS 55	1926	1953	Former WIS 55; decommissioned when US 41 freeway was built; now Fond du Lac Avenue
WIS 167	24.96	40.17	WIS 83 in Hartford	I-43/WIS 32/WIS 57 in Mequon	1926	current	
WIS 168	—	—	US 16 (now WIS 16) east of Sparta	Fort McCoy (now the Sparta/Fort McCoy Airport)	1934	1959	Now CTH-A and 13th Avenue
WIS 168	5.93	9.54	Nichols	Seymour	1985	2003	Now CTH-VV
WIS 169	—	—	US 16 (now WIS 16) in Sparta	Fort McCoy (now the Sparta/Fort McCoy Airport)	1940	1947	Now WIS 21
WIS 169	17.36	27.94	WIS 13 in Mellen	US 2 in Cedar	1956	current	
WIS 170	23.98	38.59	WIS 128 in Glenwood City	WIS 40 in Colfax	1941	current	
WIS 171	33.39	53.74	WIS 35 in Ferryville	US 14 in Boaz	1943	current	
WIS 172	—	—	US 12 in Eau Claire	US 53 in Eau Claire	1945	1964	Replaced by Bus. US 12
WIS 172	11.63	18.72	WIS 54 in Hobart	I-43 in Bellevue	1975	current	
WIS 173	36.85	59.30	WIS 21 in Wyeville	WIS 73 in Nekoosa	1947	current	
WIS 174	5.90	9.50	WIS 31 in Pleasant Prairie	WIS 50 in Kenosha	1947	1990	Now CTH-ML
WIS 175	51.40	82.72	WIS 59 in Milwaukee	US 151 in Fond du Lac	1953	current	
WIS 176	12.7	20.4	WIS 78 in Wiota	Illinois state line	1947	1999	Now CTH-D
WIS 177	2.6	4.2	WIS 42 north of Two Rivers	Rawley Point	1951	1985	Now CTH-V
WIS 178	23.30	37.50	WIS 29 in Chippewa Falls	WIS 64 in Cornell	1947	current	
WIS 179	8.80	14.16	WIS 27 in Eastman	WIS 131 in Steuben	1947	current	
WIS 180	30.42	48.96	WIS 64 in Marinette	US 141 in Wausaukee	1948	current	
WIS 181	21.44	34.50	WIS 59 in West Allis	WIS 60 in Cedarburg	1947	current	
WIS 182	33.41	53.77	WIS 13 in Park Falls	US 51/WIS 47 in Manitowish	1948	current	
WIS 183	35.3	56.8	WIS 35 near Pepin	WIS 29 near Spring Valley	1947	1989	Now CTH-CC
WIS 184	12.04	19.38	WIS 11 east of Footville	WIS 59 north of Fulton	1947	1999	Now CTH-H
WIS 185	3.2	5.1	US 12 in Camp Douglas	Hustler	1959	1991	Now CTH-H
WIS 186	15.01	24.16	WIS 13/WIS 73 in Vesper	US 10 in Auburndale	1947	current	
WIS 187	13.87	22.32	WIS 54 in Shiocton	WIS 156 in Navarino	1947	current	
WIS 188	11.88	19.12	US 12 in Sauk City	WIS 113 in Harmony Grove	1947	current	
WIS 189	1.4	2.3	WIS 83 in Rochester	WIS 20	1947	1969	Now CTH-D
WIS 190	19.58	31.51	WIS 16 in Pewaukee	WIS 32 in Shorewood	1947	current	
WIS 191	13.04	20.99	WIS 23 in Dodgeville	WIS 39 in Hollandale	1947	current	
WIS 192	2.60	4.18	WIS 50 in Pleasant Prairie	Former WIS 142 (now CTH-S) in Kenosha County	1947	1990	Now CTH-H
WIS 193	—	—	WIS 139 near Tipler	WIS 101 near Florence	1947	1949	Became part of WIS 70
WIS 193	1.42	2.29	WIS 60 in Port Andrew	WIS 80 in Port Andrew	1949	current	
WIS 194	—	—	US 14 in Janesville	US 51 in Janesville	1949	1952	Now part of US 14
WIS 194	11.32	18.22	WIS 27 in Rusk County	CTH-H in McKinley	1961	2005	Now CTH-D
WIS 195	7.36	11.84	I-41/I-94/US 41	WIS 32	2024	current	
WIS 199	—	—	—	—	1990	2011	Now WIS 794 SPUR (road was unsigned and still is)
WIS 213	27.21	43.79	IL 2 at Beloit	US 14/WIS 59 in Evansville	1961	current	
WIS 241	11.21	18.04	I-94/US 41 in Oak Creek	WIS 24 in Milwaukee	1999	current	Previously US 41
WIS 243	0.30	0.48	MN 243 in Osceola	WIS 35 in Osceola	1949	current	
WIS 253	7.61	12.25	US 53 in Sarona	US 63 in Spooner	1988	current	
WIS 310	8.72	14.03	I-43/US 10 in Manitowoc	WIS 42 in Two Rivers	1984	current	
WIS 311	2.00	3.22	CTH-KR in Somers	WIS 11 in Sturtevant	2022	current	
WIS 312	7.90	12.71	I-94 in Eau Claire	US 53 in Eau Claire	2005	current	
WIS 318	2.0	3.2	US 18 in Waukesha	I-94 in Pewaukee	2017	current	Wisconsin Highway 318 was planned to be extended south totaling 6 miles in length, forming a complete bypass and ending at Wisconsin Highway 59. However, U.S. Highway 18 used the whole bypass instead.
WIS 341	1	1.6	WIS 59 in West Milwaukee	I-94/US 41 in Milwaukee	1999	2015	Now WIS 175
WIS 351	2.64	4.25	US 51 south of Janesville	I-90/I-39 southeast of Janesville	1988	2002	Now WIS 11
WIS 441	10.88	17.51	US 10/I-41 in Menasha	I-41 in Appleton	1994	current	
WIS 794	4.76	7.66	CTH-ZZ in South Milwaukee	I-794 in Milwaukee	1999	current	John R. Plewa Memorial Lake Parkway
Former

== Special routes ==
Except where indicated, the following highways are or were locally maintained.

Number	Length (mi)	Length (km)	Southern or western terminus	Northern or eastern terminus	Formed	Removed	Notes
Bus. WIS 11	2.60	4.18	WIS 11 on the west limits of Monroe	WIS 11 & WIS 69 north of downtown Monroe	1978	current	
Bus. WIS 13	2.91	4.68	US 10, WIS 13 & CTH-BB south of Marshfield	WIS 13 & WIS 97 in downtown Marshfield	2003	current	Follows Central Avenue through Marshfield along the former route's path; state-maintained
Bus. WIS 13	1.49	2.40	WIS 13 & WIS 54 in Wisconsin Rapids	WIS 13, WIS 34 & WIS 73 in Wisconsin Rapids	1981	2000	Followed the former route's path along 8th Street South and East/West Grand Ave
Bus. WIS 16	3.85	6.20	WIS 16 & WIS 26 on the northern edge of Watertown	WIS 16 & WIS 19 on the eastern edge of Watertown	1978	current	Former route of U.S. Route 16 in Wisconsin; was Bus. US 16 1961–1978
Bus. WIS 23	2.40	3.86	WIS 23 southwest of downtown Green Lake	WIS 23 north of downtown Green Lake	1967	current	
Bus. WIS 23	4.30	6.92	WIS 23 northwest of downtown Plymouth	WIS 23 & WIS 57 northeast of Plymouth	1985	current	
Bus. WIS 26	5.50	8.85	WIS 26 southwest of Fort Atkinson	WIS 26 north of Fort Atkinson	1995	current	
Bus. WIS 26	4.40	7.08	WIS 26 near Jefferson	WIS 26 near Jefferson	—	—	
Bus. WIS 26	5.40	8.69	WIS 26 near Watertown	WIS 26 near Watertown	—	—	
Bus. WIS 26	—	—	WIS 26 east of Fort Atkinson	WIS 26 northeast of Fort Atkinson	—	—	
Bus. WIS 29	8.60	13.84	WIS 29 southwest of Chippewa Falls	WIS 29 southeast of downtown Chippewa Falls	2005	current	
Bus. WIS 29	2.50	4.02	WIS 29 west of Abbotsford	WIS 29 east of Abbotsford	1999	current	
Bus. WIS 29	6.70	10.78	WIS 29 & CTH-MMM west of Shawano	WIS 29, WIS 47/WIS 55 & CTH-K southeast of downtown Shawano	1998	current	Follows part of former alignment through Shawano before joining WIS 47/WIS 55 to return to the main route
Bus. WIS 29	2.80	4.51	US 45, WIS 29 & CTH-M on the north side of Wittenberg	US 45, WIS 29 & CTH-Q east of Wittenberg	1999	current	Follows former alignment of US 45 through Wittenberg; co-signed as CTH-Q
Bus. WIS 35	4.10	6.60	US 53, WIS 35 & CTH-HD south of Holmen	US 53/WIS 93, WIS 35 & CTH-HD northwest of Holmen	—	—	
Bus. WIS 40	0.80	1.29	US 8 & WIS 40 in downtown Bruce	WIS 40 northwest of downtown Bruce	1999	current	
Bus. WIS 42	4.50	7.24	US 151 east of I-43 along Calumet Avenue	US 10/WIS 42 at Waldo Boulevard	1980	2022	Followed older alignment through Manitowoc
Bus. WIS 42	—	—	—	—	1980	1993	Served Sheboygan
Bus. WIS 42	3.55	5.71	WIS 42/WIS 57 along Green Bay Road	WIS 42/WIS 57 along Egg Harbor Road	1977	current	Follows former alignment through Sturgeon Bay, cosigned with Bus. WIS 57
Spur WIS 42	0.08	0.13	WIS 42 in Gills Rock	Island Clipper ferry dock in Gills Rock	—	—	Unsigned; state-maintained
Bus. WIS 57	3.55	5.71	WIS 42/WIS 57 along Green Bay Road	WIS 42/WIS 57 along Egg Harbor Road	—	—	Follows former alignment through Sturgeon Bay, cosigned with Bus. WIS 42
Bus. WIS 64	3.9	6.3	—	—	—	—	
Bus. WIS 64	2.7	4.3	—	—	—	—	
Spur WIS 794	0.30	0.48	WIS 794 in St. Francis	WIS 32 in St. Francis	—	—	Unsigned on Howard Avenue; state-maintained
Former
