= Wisconsin Highway 109 =

State highway in Wisconsin, United States

State Trunk Highway 109

Route information
- Maintained by WisDOT
- Length: 19.24 mi (30.96 km)
- Existed: 1923–1998

Major junctions
- South end: WIS 67 west of Woodland
- North end: WIS 16 in Watertown

Location
- Country: United States
- State: Wisconsin
- Counties: Jefferson, Dodge

Highway system
- Wisconsin State Trunk Highway System; Interstate; US; State; Scenic; Rustic
← WIS 108	→ WIS 110

State Trunk Highway 109 (often called Highway 109, STH-109 or WIS 109) was a 19.24-mile (30.96 km) state highway in southeastern Dodge County, Wisconsin, United States, that ran north–south between Woodland and Watertown.

== History ==
Initially, in 1919, WIS 109 was established to follow along current WIS 95 from WIS 11 (now US 53) in Blair to WIS 84 (now CTH-FF) in Hixton. In 1923, with no significant changes happening during its first existence, WIS 109 was removed in favor of WIS 53 (now WIS 95). That same year, WIS 109 appeared on another location, running from Watertown to WIS 67 in Woodland. No significant changes had occurred during its second iteration. In 1998, the road was turned over to Dodge County, which now maintains it as County Highway R.

== Major intersections ==
County	Location	mi	km	Destinations	Notes
Jefferson	Watertown			WIS 19 / Bus. WIS 16 (E. Main Street)	
Dodge	Watertown			WIS 16	
Dodge	Hustisford			Rubicon Street to WIS 60	No direct access to WIS 60
Dodge	Woodland			WIS 67	
1.000 mi = 1.609 km; 1.000 km = 0.621 mi
