= Wisconsin Highway 193 =

State highway in Wisconsin, United States

State Trunk Highway 193
- WIS 193 highlighted in red

Route information
- Maintained by WisDOT
- Length: 1.42 mi (2.29 km)
- Existed: 1949–present

Major junctions
- South end: WIS 60 south of Balmoral
- North end: WIS 80 east of Balmoral

Location
- Country: United States
- State: Wisconsin
- Counties: Richland

Highway system
- Wisconsin State Trunk Highway System; Interstate; US; State; Scenic; Rustic
| ← WIS 192 | → WIS 194 |

State Trunk Highway 193 (often called Highway 193, STH-193 or WIS 193) is a 1.42-mile (2.29 km) state highway in the Town of Eagle in Richland County in the US state of Wisconsin that runs north–south from the south of, to the east of, the unincorporated community of Balmoral, several miles north of the village of Muscoda.

== Route description ==
WIS 193 starts at a T-intersection with WIS 60. The highway runs northward from this intersection through some farm fields. Near the Mill Creek crossing, the roadway passes through some woods before it turns easterly through more fields. South-southeast of the Dawson Cemetery, WIS 193 terminates at its intersection with WIS 80 at a T-intersection.

== History ==
The first highway to carry the WIS 193 designation was given the moniker in 1947 when 20 miles (32 km) of roads in Florence County in the northern part of the state. This highway was supplanted by an extension of WIS 70 in 1949. Shortly afterwards, the current highway was designated; the routing has not substantially changed since.

== Major intersections ==
The entire route is in Eagle, Richland County.

| mi | km | Destinations | Notes |
|---|---|---|---|
| 0.00 | 0.00 | WIS 60 – Gotham, Wauzeka, Prairie du Chien | Southern terminus |
| 1.42 | 2.29 | WIS 80 – Richland Center, Muscoda | Northern terminus |
1.000 mi = 1.609 km; 1.000 km = 0.621 mi
