= Wisconsin Highway 194 =

Former State Highway in Wisconsin, United States

State Trunk Highway 194

Route information
- Length: 11.32 mi (18.22 km)
- Existed: 1961–October 3, 2005

Major junctions
- West end: WIS 27 north of Holcombe
- North end: CTH-H east of Sheldon

Location
- Country: United States
- State: Wisconsin
- Counties: Rusk, Taylor

Highway system
- Wisconsin State Trunk Highway System; Interstate; US; State; Scenic; Rustic
← WIS 193	→ WIS 195

State Trunk Highway 194 (often called Highway 194, STH-194 or WIS 194) was an 11.32-mile (18.22 km) state highway Rusk and Taylor counties in the US state of Wisconsin. The road was turned over to county control in 2005, and is now County Trunk Highway D (CTH-D).

== History ==
WIS 194 was initially formed in 1949 as a temporary route along an incomplete bypass of Janesville. The route ran from US 14 (now CTH-E) to US 51. Once the bypass was finished, US 14 moved north onto the bypass; this effectively removed WIS 194 and established City US 14 along the old US 14 alignment.

WIS 194 was formed when CTH-D in Rusk and Taylor counties between WIS 27 and WIS 73 was transferred to state control. By 1992, the state transferred the eastern 6.5-mile (10.5 km) segment from the Town of McKinley east to WIS 73. One 1/4-mile-long (0.40 km) segment was given to the county and became CTH-H while the rest became local roads. The remainder of the highway was transferred to the two counties on October 3, 2005.

== Major intersections ==
County	Location	mi	km	Destinations	Notes
Rusk		0.00	0.00	WIS 27 – Ladysmith, Cornell; CTH-D – Island Lake	Western terminus; roadway continued as CTH-D
Taylor	Town of McKinley	11.32	18.22	CTH-H	Eastern terminus
1.000 mi = 1.609 km; 1.000 km = 0.621 mi
