= Wisconsin Highway 146 =

Highway in Wisconsin

State Trunk Highway 146
- WIS 146 highlighted in red

Route information
- Maintained by WisDOT
- Length: 13.22 mi (21.28 km)

Major junctions
- South end: WIS 16 near Fall River
- North end: WIS 33 near Cambria

Location
- Country: United States
- State: Wisconsin
- Counties: Columbia

Highway system
- Wisconsin State Trunk Highway System; Interstate; US; State; Scenic; Rustic
← WIS 145	→ WIS 147

State Trunk Highway 146 (often called Highway 146, STH-146 or WIS 146) is a state highway in the U.S. state of Wisconsin. It runs north–south in central Wisconsin from Fall River to Cambria. It was designated in between 1923 and 1925.

== Route description ==
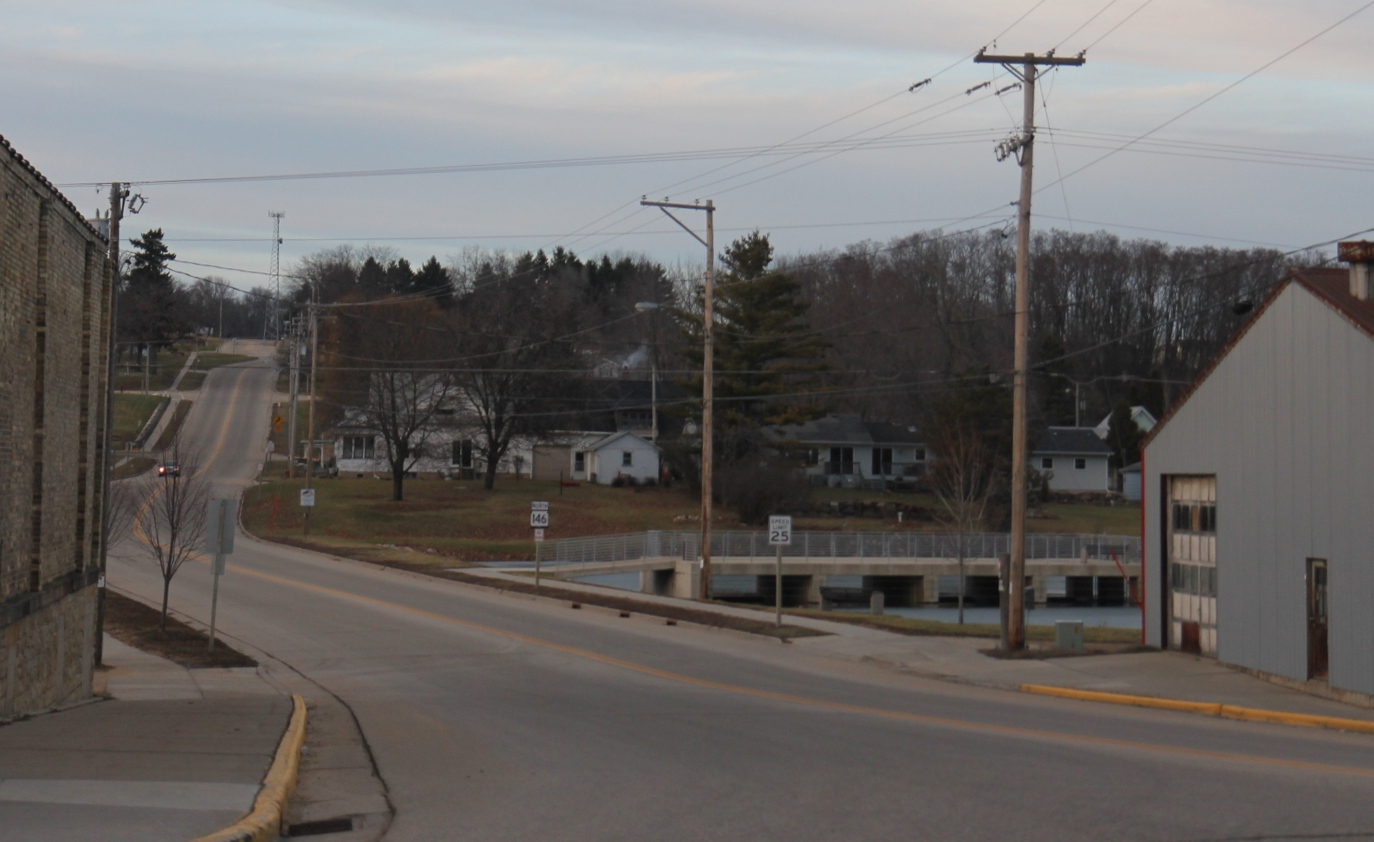
Looking north on Highway 146 in Cambria

Starting at WIS 16 northwest of Fall River, WIS 146 begins its journey northward. It then meanders northward to Cambria. In Cambria, WIS 146 turns north via Williams Street, west via Florence Street, and then north again via Madison Street. After leaving Cambria, it then meets WIS 33. At this point, the route ends there and continues as County Trunk Highways M (CTH-M).

== History ==
The first iteration of WIS 146 was established in 1923 to connect Bellevue southeast of Green Bay to Kewaunee at the lake. WIS 146 was eventually removed and replaced by WIS 29 (former WIS 16) in 1926.

State Trunk Highway 141
- Location: Fall River–Cambria, Wisconsin
- Existed: 1923–1926

Wisconsin Highway 141 (WIS 141) was designated along WIS 146's current route between 1923 and 1925. It was renumbered to WIS 146 in 1926 to avoid duplicating a newly-established U.S. Highway with the same number in Wisconsin.

== Major intersections ==
The entire highway is in Columbia County.

Location	mi	km	Destinations	Notes
Town of Fountain Prairie	0.00	0.00	WIS 16 – Columbus, Portage	
Town of Randolph	13.22	21.28	WIS 33 – Fox Lake, Portage	
1.000 mi = 1.609 km; 1.000 km = 0.621 mi
