= Wisconsin Highway 117 =

State highway in Wisconsin, United States

State Trunk Highway 117
- WIS 117 highlighted in red

Route information
- Maintained by WisDOT
- Length: 5.79 mi (9.32 km)

Major junctions
- South end: WIS 29 / WIS 47 / WIS 55 in Bonduel
- North end: WIS 22 in Cecil

Location
- Country: United States
- State: Wisconsin
- Counties: Shawano

Highway system
- Wisconsin State Trunk Highway System; Interstate; US; State; Scenic; Rustic
← WIS 116	→ WIS 118

State Trunk Highway 117 (often called Highway 117, STH-117 or WIS 117) is a state highway located entirely within Shawano County in the U.S. state of Wisconsin. It runs from a junction with Highway 29, Highway 47, and Highway 55 in Bonduel north to Highway 22 in Cecil. Highway 117 is maintained by the Wisconsin Department of Transportation (WisDOT).

== Route description ==
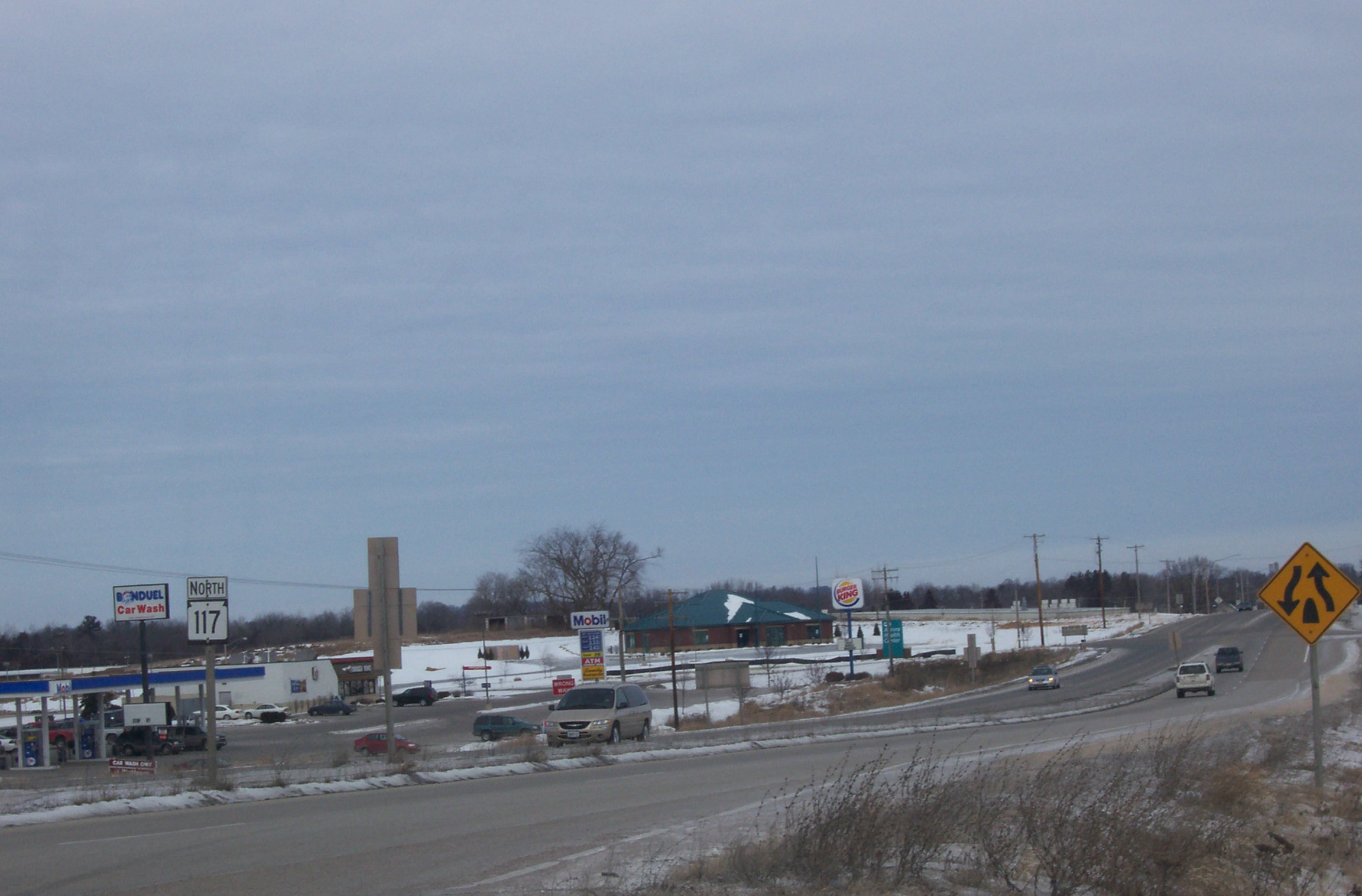
Looking north from the south terminus

Highway 117 begins at a junction with Highway 29, Highway 47, and Highway 55 in southern Bonduel. Highway 29 and Highway 55 run east-west as a freeway here, as does Highway 47 west of the intersection. From here, Highway 117 heads north toward downtown Bonduel as a surface road. The route meets County Highway BE in downtown Bonduel, then passes through a residential area before crossing the Mountain-Bay State Trail near the northern edge of the city. After leaving Bonduel, the highway continues north through farmland in the Town of Hartland. The route enters a rural part of the Town of Washington, meeting County Highway E north of the town line. Curving to the northwest, Highway 117 enters Cecil, where it passes a gas station before terminating at Highway 22. Shawano Lake lies to the north of the terminus.

Highway 117 is maintained by the Wisconsin Department of Transportation, a Wisconsin state agency responsible for planning, building and maintaining Wisconsin state highways. WisDOT collects traffic data on state highways; this data is measured in annual average daily traffic, an estimate of the number of vehicles which use a road on an average day in a given year. In 2009, WisDOT estimated that, per day, 8200 vehicles use the portion of Highway 117 in southern Bonduel, 7800 use the portion in downtown Bonduel, and 5400 use the portion between Bonduel and Cecil. No portion of Highway 117 is part of the National Highway System, a network of roads considered significant to the nation's economy, defense, and mobility.

== Major intersections ==
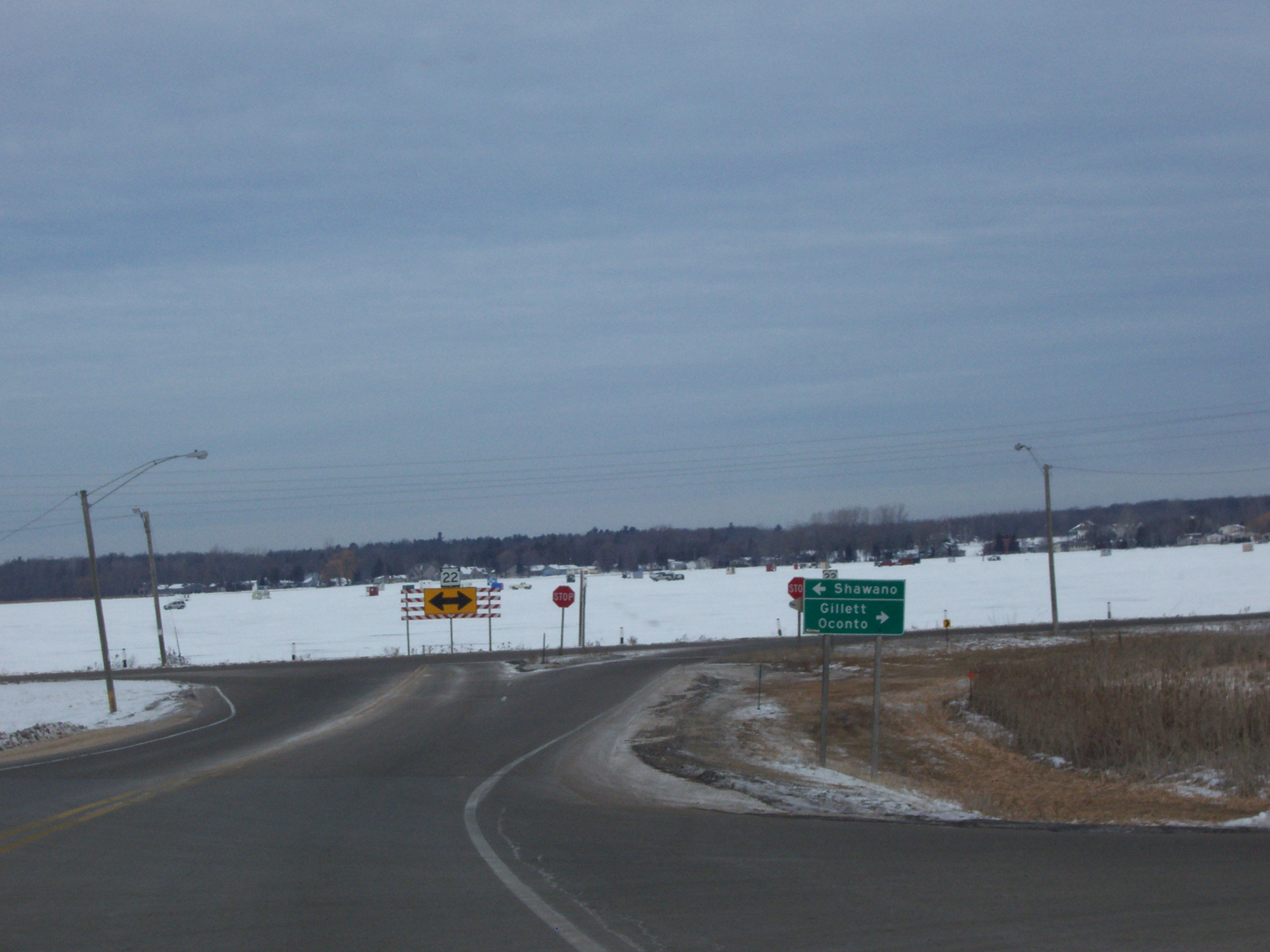
Northern terminus at Shawano Lake in Cecil

The entire route is in Shawano County.

Location	mi	km	Destinations	Notes
Bonduel	0.0	0.0	WIS 29 / WIS 47 / WIS 55 – Shawano, Wausau, Green Bay	
Cecil	5.6	9.0	WIS 22 – Shawano, Gillett, Oconto	
1.000 mi = 1.609 km; 1.000 km = 0.621 mi
