= Wisconsin Highway 91 =

State highway in Wisconsin, United States

State Trunk Highway 91
- WIS 91 highlighted in red

Route information
- Maintained by WisDOT
- Length: 18.83 mi (30.30 km)

Major junctions
- West end: WIS 49 in Berlin
- East end: I-41 / US 41 / WIS 44 in Oshkosh

Location
- Country: United States
- State: Wisconsin
- Counties: Green Lake, Winnebago

Highway system
- Wisconsin State Trunk Highway System; Interstate; US; State; Scenic; Rustic
← WIS 90	→ WIS 92

State Trunk Highway 91 (often called Highway 91, STH-91 or WIS 91) is a state highway in the U.S. state of Wisconsin. It runs east–west in east-central Wisconsin from near Berlin to Oshkosh.

== Route description ==
Starting in WIS 49 in Berlin, WIS 91 starts to travel eastward, passing Koro. South of Waukau, it intersects WIS 116 and CTH-M. Going further east through the Oshkosh city limit, WIS 91 intersects and starts to run concurrently with WIS 44. However, as soon as they meet I-41/US 41 at a diamond interchange, WIS 91 ends there. WIS 44, on the other hand, continues northeast to downtown Oshkosh.

== History ==
Initially, in 1919, WIS 91 was established along part of present-day WIS 44. It traveled from WIS 23/WIS 49 (now just WIS 23) in Ripon to WIS 15 (now US 45) in Oshkosh. In 1924, WIS 91 was relocated from the Ripon–Oshkosh route to the Merill–McCord route, causing CTH-E to move just northwest of its former route. This was done in response to the northeastern extension of WIS 44. The new route traveled from US 51 in Merill to US 8 in McCord along present-day WIS 107, pre-bypass alignment of WIS 10 (after 1926, US 51), and present-day CTH-CC. It also functioned as an alternate route of WIS 10.

By 1935, WIS 91 was removed south of the intersection of US 51 (now CTH-A) north of downtown Tomahawk. In 1937, the rest of WIS 91 was removed in favor of turning this back to local control (replaced by CTH-CC). This time, the route remained decommissioned for around a year. By 1939, WIS 91 was readded right near the location of its second alignment. It traveled from US 51 (now CTH-A) north of Tomahawk to US 8 in Bradley. In the mid-1980s, WIS 91 was decommissioned again in favor of the opening of US 51's Tomahawk Bypass and CTH-U. It remained decommissioned until 1996 when WIS 91 was readded again, traveling from Berlin to Oshkosh. It superseded a southernmost portion of WIS 116 and CTH-X. This time, the new routing still exists to this day.

== Major intersections ==
County	Location	mi	km	Destinations	Notes
Green Lake	Berlin			WIS 49 (Huron Street) / Spring Street	Roadway continues as northbound WIS 49
Winnebago	Town of Rushford			WIS 116 north – Omro	
Winnebago	Oshkosh			WIS 44 south – Ripon	Western end of WIS 44 concurrency
Winnebago	Oshkosh			I-41 / US 41 – Green Bay, Milwaukee WIS 44 north (South Park Avenue)	Roadway continues as northbound WIS 44
1.000 mi = 1.609 km; 1.000 km = 0.621 mi: Concurrency terminus
