= Wisconsin Highway 39 =

Highway in Wisconsin

State Trunk Highway 39
- WIS 39 highlighted in red

Route information
- Maintained by WisDOT
- Length: 43.02 mi (69.23 km)

Major junctions
- West end: US 18 in Edmund
- Bus. US 151 in Mineral Point
- East end: WIS 69 in New Glarus

Location
- Country: United States
- State: Wisconsin
- Counties: Iowa, Green

Highway system
- Wisconsin State Trunk Highway System; Interstate; US; State; Scenic; Rustic
← I-39	→ WIS 40

State Trunk Highway 39 (often called Highway 39, STH-39 or WIS 39) is a state highway in the U.S. state of Wisconsin. It runs in east–west across south central Wisconsin from Edmund to New Glarus.

WIS 39 is one of only two numbered state trunk highways, along with WIS 794, that share a number designation with an Interstate or US Highway within the state's borders. Wisconsin Department of Transportation (WisDOT) policy prohibited dual designations within the state trunk highway system, prior to the commissioning of Interstate 39 (I-39) in 1992.

== Route description ==
WIS 39 begins at the intersection of US Highway 18, less than a quarter of a mile (roughly 200 meters) from the unincorporated community of Edmund, Wisconsin. Heading south, it heads into the village of Linden where it is known as Franklin Street.

In the center of Linden, WIS 39 heads southeast on Main Street out of town, through the hills of Southwestern Wisconsin, crossing under US Highway 151 outside of Mineral Point.

Entering Mineral Point on Fountain Street, it passes the entrance to the Iowa County Fairgrounds to Dodge Street, where it heads north with Bus. US 151 around the downtown area. At the north side of the city, WIS 39 turns south with WIS 23 down Commerce Street.

The two state highways turn southeast on Doty Street just northeast of the downtown area to head out of the city. The intersection crosses Shakerag Street, which heads towards the entrance to Pendarvis, a state historical site.

Outside of the city, WIS 39 heads northeast on Jackson Street while WIS 23 continues to the southeast. Wandering through rural farmland and the town of Waldwick, Highway 39 finally reaches the village of Hollandale, where it is known as Waldwick Road. In downtown Hollandale, WIS 39 intersects with the southern terminus of WIS 191.

WIS 39 continues in a generally eastern direction through the rolling hills of southwest Wisconsin to its intersection with WIS 78. WIS 78 crosses from the west to the northeast, while WIS 39 continues east.

WIS 39 finally reaches New Glarus, where it becomes 6th Avenue. After crossing the Sugar River State Bike Trail (built on a former railway line), the route ends at its eastern terminus of WIS 69.

== History ==
Initially, WIS 39 traveled from WIS 16 in Birnamswood to WIS 14 in Pratt Junction via present-day US 45. By 1920, both ends of WIS 39 was extended. The new north route traveled all the way to WIS 10 in Woodruff. For the south route, it traveled south all the way to Oshkosh. By 1924, WIS 39 moved from an Oshkosh–Woodruff route to Edmund–Albany route. As a result, WIS 26, as well as WIS 47, filled in the former route. The new route followed its present-day routing as well as a connection to Albany. From 1931 to 1938, WIS 39 lost its connection to Edmund in favor of extending WIS 62 northward.

Since 1992, WIS 39 coexisted with I-39. Normally, within the state, two or more different routes with the same number cannot coexist in accordance with WisDOT. Still, both routes with the same number coexist to this day.

Since 1999, the connection to Albany was degraded to County Highway F in accordance to transferring part of it (Monticello–Albany) back to local control.

== Major intersections ==
County	Location	mi	km	Destinations	Notes
Iowa	Edmund	0.0	0.0	US 18 – Dodgeville, Fennimore	Western terminus of WIS 39
Iowa	Mineral Point	10.4	16.7	Bus. US 151 south	Western end of Bus. US 151 overlap
Iowa	Mineral Point	11.2	18.0	Bus. US 151 north / WIS 23 north – Dodgeville	Western end of WIS 23 overlap; eastern end of Bus. US 151 overlap
Iowa	Mineral Point	12.5	20.1	WIS 23 south – Darlington	Eastern end of WIS 23 overlap
Iowa	Hollandale	25.3	40.7	WIS 191 west – Dodgeville	
Green	Town of York	32.8	52.8	WIS 78 south – Blanchardville	Southern end of WIS 78 overlap
Green	Town of York	33.0	53.1	WIS 78 north – Mount Horeb	Northern end of WIS 78 overlap
Green	New Glarus	43.0	69.2	WIS 69 – Belleville, Monticello, Monroe	Eastern terminus of WIS 39
1.000 mi = 1.609 km; 1.000 km = 0.621 mi: Concurrency terminus; Incomplete access
