= Wisconsin Highway 157 =

State highway in Wisconsin, United States

State Trunk Highway 157
- WIS 157 highlighted in red

Route information
- Maintained by WisDOT
- Length: 2.81 mi (4.52 km)

Major junctions
- West end: WIS 35 in Onalaska
- I-90 / US 53 in Onalaska
- East end: WIS 16 in La Crosse

Location
- Country: United States
- State: Wisconsin
- Counties: La Crosse

Highway system
- Wisconsin State Trunk Highway System; Interstate; US; State; Scenic; Rustic
← WIS 156	→ WIS 158

State Trunk Highway 157 (often called Highway 157, STH-157 or WIS 157) is a short state highway in the US state of Wisconsin. It runs east on Main Street from WIS 35 (Second Avenue) in downtown Onalaska to the US Highway 53 (US 53) freeway. There it turns south, running concurrently with US 53 to the Interstate 90 (I-90) interchange. US 53 leaves WIS 157 to head west on I-90, but WIS 157 continues southeast to WIS 16 at the Valley View Mall.

== Route description ==
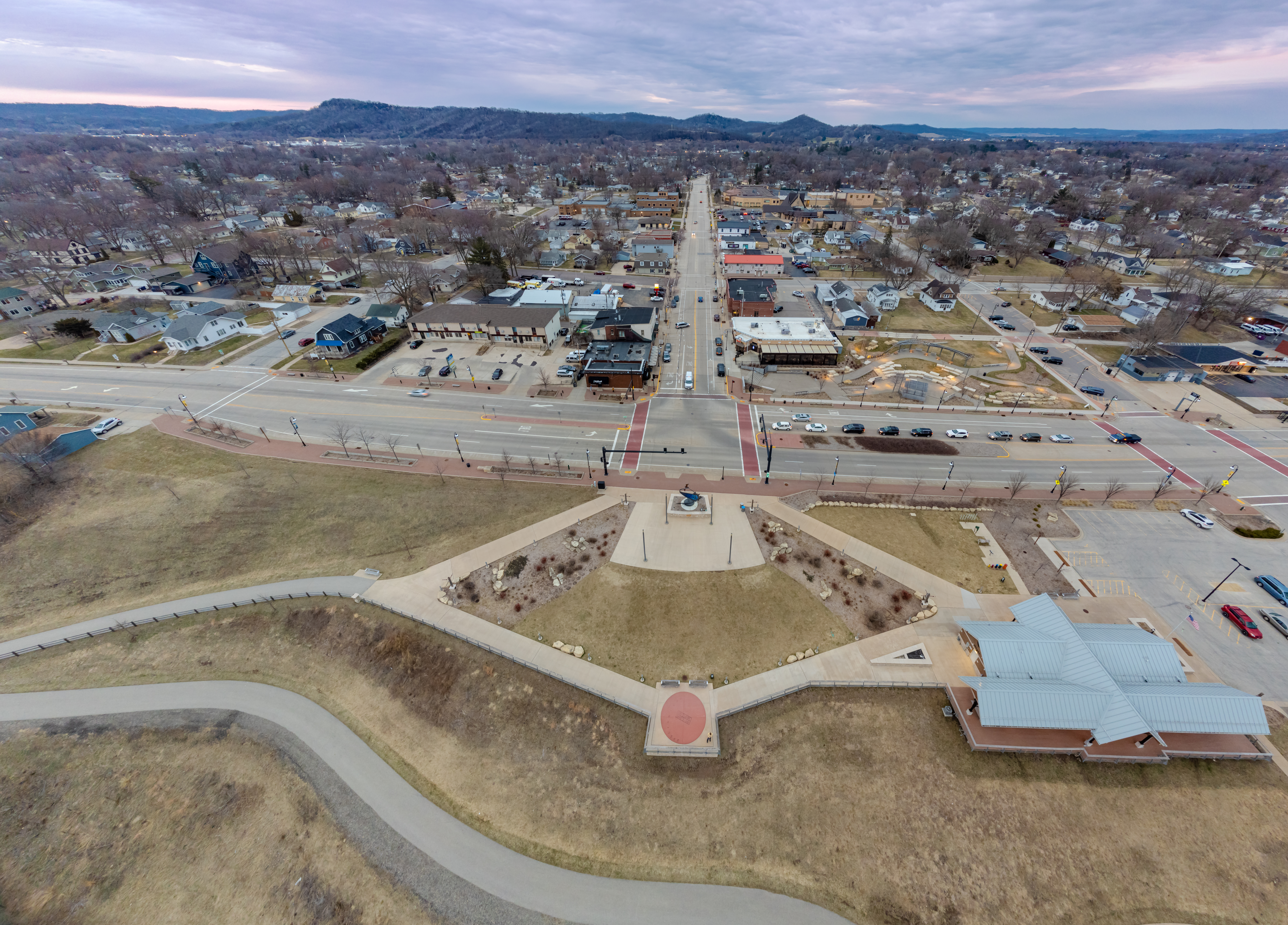
Western terminus in Onalaska

WIS 157 starts to travel north from WIS 16. Almost immediately, it meets I-90/US 53 at an interchange. At this point, not only does the roadway become an expressway, US 53 briefly runs concurrently with WIS 157. At the next interchange north, WIS 157 leaves the expressway to travel due west to downtown Onalaska. Then, in downtown Onalaska, WIS 157 ends at WIS 35.

== History ==
Initially, in 1923, WIS 157 briefly appeared to serve Briggsville via present-day County Trunk Highway AA (CTH-AA). It traveled from WIS 29 (part of it is now WIS 107) south of Briggsville to WIS 23 in Briggsville. In 1924, WIS 23 superseded the routing because WIS 23/WIS 29 concurrency was moved southward on present-day WIS 127. In 1926, WIS 157 was re-established to travel along part of the former alignment of WIS 64. This new routing traveled mostly along CTH-M from WIS 32 in Frostville to US 141 in between Coleman and Lena. In 1934, the routing was removed again in favor of transferring this route to local control (there were no county trunk highway replacement until later).

In 1938, WIS 157 was re-established to travel along its present-day route and present-day CTH-OS. It remained that way until around 1969 when the easternmost portion of WIS 157 moved southward to serve I-90 while still serving US 16 (replaced by WIS 16). Around 1990, part of WIS 157 north of I-90 was widened to an expressway in order to accommodate the newly built US 53 expressway around Onalaska.

== Major intersections ==
The entire highway is in La Crosse County.

Location	mi	km	Destinations	Notes
Onalaska	0.0	0.0	WIS 35 / Great River Road (2nd Avenue)	
Onalaska	1.1	1.8	US 53 north / Alt. I-90 – Holmen, Galesville	Western end of US 53 concurrency
Onalaska	1.8	2.9	I-90 / US 53 south – Minnesota, Madison	Eastern end of US 53 concurrency
La Crosse	2.6	4.2	WIS 16 / Alt. I-90	
1.000 mi = 1.609 km; 1.000 km = 0.621 mi: Concurrency terminus
