= Wisconsin Highway 45 =

Former state highways in Wisconsin, United States

State Trunk Highway 45

Route information
- Maintained by WisDOT
- Existed: 1918–1934

Location
- Country: United States
- State: Wisconsin

Highway system
- Wisconsin State Trunk Highway System; Interstate; US; State; Scenic; Rustic
← US 45	→ WIS 46

State Trunk Highway 45 (often called Highway 45, STH-45 or WIS 45) was a number assigned to two different state highways in the U.S. state of Wisconsin:

- Highway 45 from 1917 to 1923, along the current route of U.S. Highway 63 (from Red Wing, Minnesota, to Ellsworth, Wisconsin), Wisconsin Highway 65 and Wisconsin Highway 35 up to Hudson
- Highway 45 from 1923 to 1934, currently designated Wisconsin Highway 34
- For the highway in Wisconsin numbered 45 since 1934, see U.S. Route 45 in Wisconsin.
