= Wisconsin Highway 134 =

State highway in Wisconsin, United States

State Trunk Highway 134
- WIS 134 highlighted in red

Route information
- Maintained by WisDOT
- Length: 2.85 mi (4.59 km)

Major junctions
- South end: US 12 / US 18 in Cambridge
- North end: CTH-O in London

Location
- Country: United States
- State: Wisconsin
- Counties: Dane, Jefferson

Highway system
- Wisconsin State Trunk Highway System; Interstate; US; State; Scenic; Rustic
← WIS 133	→ WIS 135

State Trunk Highway 134 (often called Highway 134, STH-134 or WIS 134) is a 2.85-mile (4.59 km) state highway in the south central part of the U.S. state of Wisconsin. The route runs from US Highway 12 (US 12) and US 18 in Cambridge north to County Trunk Highway O (CTH-O) in London. WIS 134 is maintained by the Wisconsin Department of Transportation (WisDOT).

== Route description ==
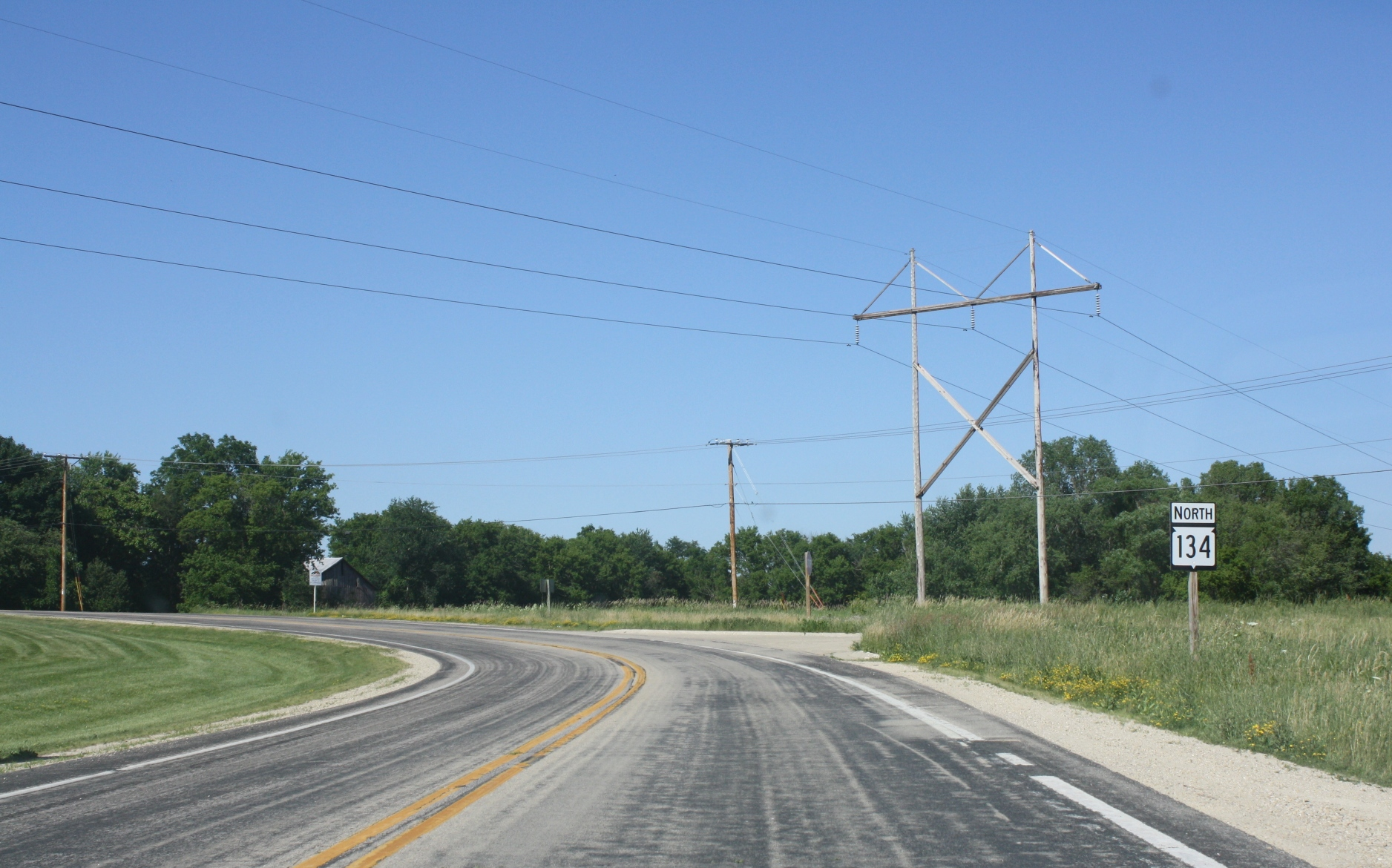
Looking north from the southern terminus

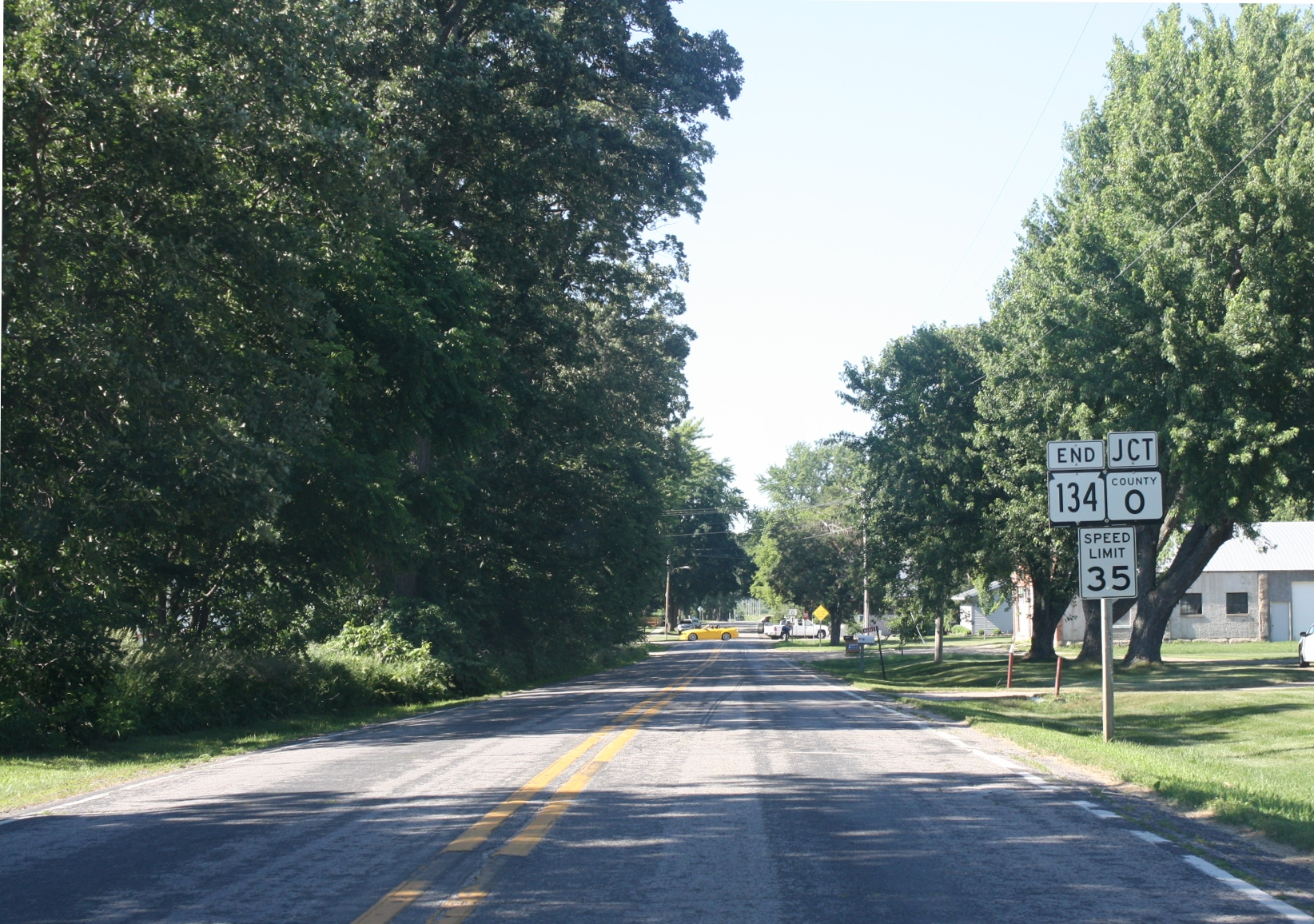
Looking north at the northern terminus

WIS 134 begins at a junction with US 12 and US 18 in the village of Cambridge in Dane County. From here, the highway heads north through a rural area of the Town of Christiana. After crossing into the Town of Deerfield, the highway heads northeast before turning north along the Dane–Jefferson county line. The highway heads through farmland into the community of London, where it terminates at a junction with Main Street and CTH-O, the latter of which continues north past the intersection.

== Major intersections ==
County	Location	mi	km	Destinations	Notes
Dane	Cambridge	0.0	0.0	US 12 / US 18 – Jefferson	
Dane–Jefferson county line	London	2.8	4.5	CTH-O – Waterloo	
1.000 mi = 1.609 km; 1.000 km = 0.621 mi
