= Wisconsin Highway 51 =

Former state highways in Wisconsin, United States

State Trunk Highway 51

Route information
- Maintained by WisDOT
- Existed: 1918–1926

Location
- Country: United States
- State: Wisconsin

Highway system
- Wisconsin State Trunk Highway System; Interstate; US; State; Scenic; Rustic
← US 51	→ WIS 52

State Trunk Highway 51 (often called Highway 51, STH-51 or WIS 51) was a number assigned to two different state highways in the U.S. state of Wisconsin:

- Highway 51 from 1917 to 1923, along the current route of U.S. Highway 63 from Turtle Lake to Spooner.
- Highway 51 from 1923 to 1936, currently routed as Highway 72 from Ellsworth to Downsville.
- For the highway in Wisconsin numbered 51 since 1926, see U.S. Highway 51.
