= CMY =

CMY may refer to:

- 1-Methylpsilocin, a psychedelic-related drug
- CMY color model
- Crossmyloof railway station's National Rail station code
- Sparta/Fort McCoy Airport's IATA code
- CMY, the ICAO code for Cape Smythe Air
