= Wisconsin Highway 191 =

Highway in Wisconsin

State Trunk Highway 191
- WIS 191 highlighted in red

Route information
- Maintained by WisDOT
- Length: 13.04 mi (20.99 km)
- Existed: 1947–present

Major junctions
- West end: WIS 23 in Dodgeville
- East end: WIS 39 / CTH-K in Hollandale

Location
- Country: United States
- State: Wisconsin
- Counties: Iowa

Highway system
- Wisconsin State Trunk Highway System; Interstate; US; State; Scenic; Rustic
← WIS 190	→ WIS 192

State Trunk Highway 191 (often called Highway 191, STH-191 or WIS 191) is a 13.04-mile (20.99 km) state highway in southeastern Iowa County in the US state of Wisconsin that runs east–west from Dodgeville to Hollandale.

== Route description ==
Following East Division Street through town, WIS 191 starts in downtown Dodgeville at the intersection with WIS 23 (Iowa Street). The highway runs through some residential neighborhoods before exiting town. At the intersection with Bennett Road, WIS 191 turns to southeasterly through fields to run under US Highway 151 (US 151); the state highway lacks a direct connection with the latter freeway. WIS 191 turns to a more easterly course after the freeway, running through southwest Wisconsin farm country. Near Tom's Campground, the highway turns to follow a southeastward course toward Hollandale. At the intersection with County Trunk Highway K (CTH-K) north of town, WIS 191 turns due south to enter the city. At Commerce Street, the highway turns southeasterly again until Main Street. There, WIS 191 follows Main Street south to its terminus at the intersection with WIS 39/CTH-K.

== History ==
WIS 191 was designated in 1947 and remains unchanged since.

== Major intersections ==
The entire highway is in Iowa County.

Location	mi	km	Destinations	Notes
Dodgeville	0.00	0.00	WIS 23 (Iowa Street) – Iowa Street Historic District, Spring Green, Reedsburg, Mineral Point, Darlington CTH-CH west (West Division Street)	Roadway continues as CTH-CH
Town of Dodgeville			CTH-Z north	
Town of Dodgeville			CTH-Y south	Western end of CTH-Y concurrency
Town of Dodgeville			CTH-Y north	Eastern end of CTH-Y concurrency
Town of Ridgeway			CTH-BB north	
Ridgeway–Waldwick town line			CTH-W south – Jonesdale, Waldwick	
Hollandale			CTH-K north	Northern end of CTH-K concurrency
Hollandale	13.04	20.99	WIS 39 / CTH-K east (Waldwick Street) – New Glarus, Mineral Point; Main Street south	Southern end of CTH-K concurrency; roadway continues as Main Street
1.000 mi = 1.609 km; 1.000 km = 0.621 mi: Concurrency terminus
