= Wisconsin Highway 116 =

State highway in Wisconsin, United States

State Trunk Highway 116
- WIS 116 highlighted in red

Route information
- Maintained by WisDOT
- Length: 14.19 mi (22.84 km)

Major junctions
- South end: WIS 91 in Waukau
- WIS 21 in Omro
- North end: US 45 in Butte des Morts

Location
- Country: United States
- State: Wisconsin
- Counties: Winnebago

Highway system
- Wisconsin State Trunk Highway System; Interstate; US; State; Scenic; Rustic
← WIS 115	→ WIS 117

State Trunk Highway 116 (often called Highway 116, STH-116 or WIS 116) is a state highway in the US state of Wisconsin. It runs in north–south in east central Wisconsin from the unincorporated community of Waukau to Butte des Morts.

== Route description ==
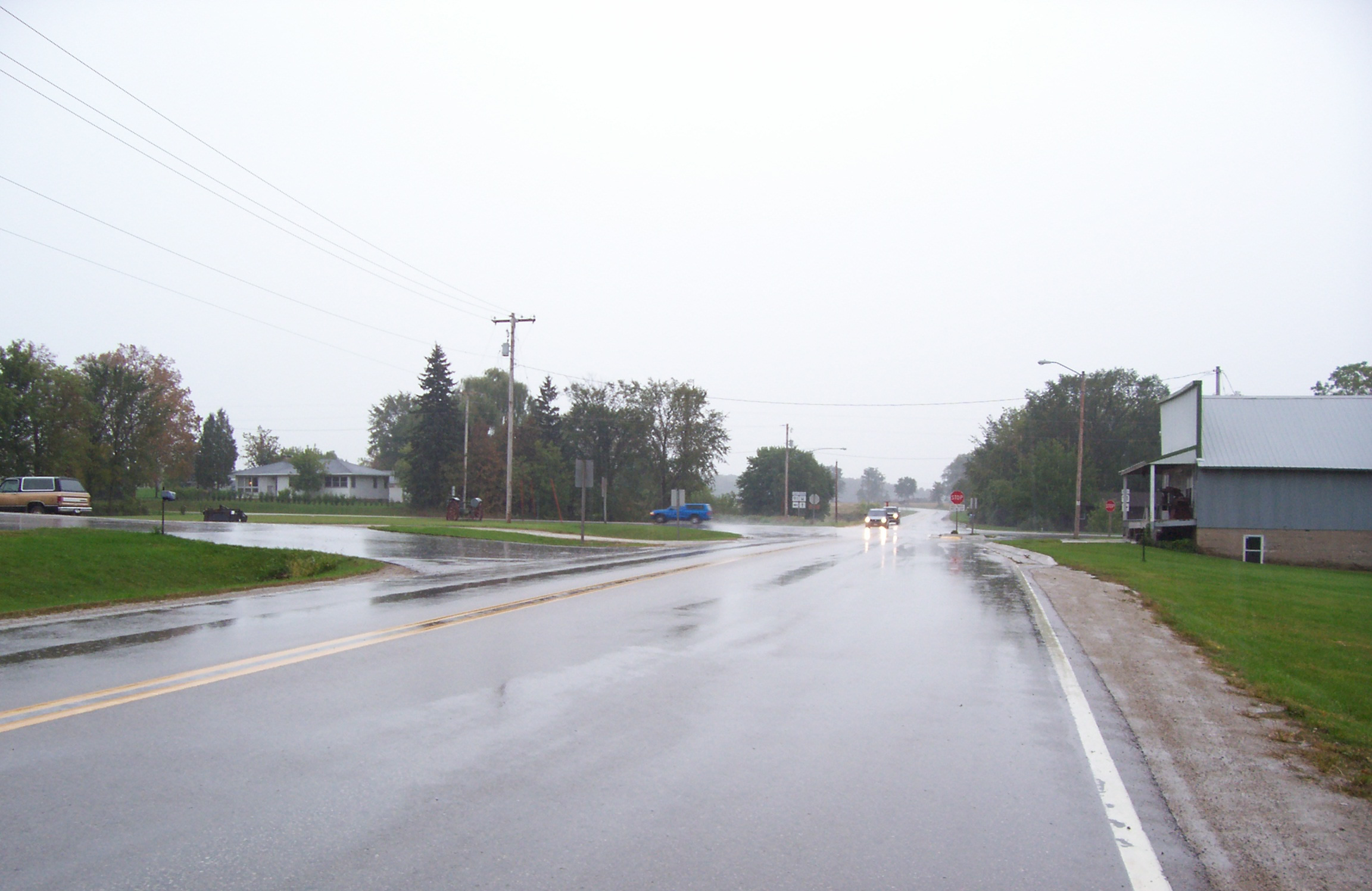
Southern Terminus

WIS 116 begins at the intersection of WIS 91 (also known as Waukau Avenue) and County Trunk Highway M (CTH-M) just outside Waukau. Heading north through the town, it continues in a generally northern direction until it reaches CTH-E (Fourth Street Road) on the outskirts of Omro.

Turning briefly on Fourth Street Road, it then resumes north on Waukau Road past the Omro Cemetery into the city. Once in Omro, WIS 116 heads north on Jefferson Avenue to Main Street, on the south side of the Fox River.

Joining WIS 21, it heads west for a block before crossing the river. On the north bank of the river, WIS 21 heads west while WIS 116 heads east on River Drive, until it splits to the north onto Willow Street. Continuing northwest out of the city, WIS 116 becomes Achterberg Road until it reaches Main Street in Winneconne.

Crossing over the Wolf River in downtown Winneconne, WIS 116 heads east to its terminus at the interchange with US 45 near the northern shore of Lake Butte des Morts.

== History ==
In the most recent iteration of the highway, WIS 116 originally ran further west to the city of Berlin. In 1996, the route was transferred to WIS 91.

== Major intersections ==
The entire route is in Winnebago County.

Location	mi	km	Destinations	Notes
Waukau			WIS 91 – Oshkosh, Berlin	
Omro			WIS 21 east – Oshkosh	Southern end of WIS 21 concurrency
Omro			WIS 21 west – Wautoma	Northern end of WIS 21 concurrency
Town of Winneconne			US 45 – Oshkosh, New London; CTH-GG	
1.000 mi = 1.609 km; 1.000 km = 0.621 mi: Concurrency terminus
