= Wisconsin Highway 14 =

State highway in Wisconsin, United States

State Trunk Highway 14

Route information
- Maintained by WisDOT
- Existed: 1918–1933

Location
- Country: United States
- State: Wisconsin

Highway system
- Wisconsin State Trunk Highway System; Interstate; US; State; Scenic; Rustic
← US 14	→ WIS 15

State Trunk Highway 14 (often called Highway 14, STH-14 or WIS 14) was a number assigned to two different state highways in Wisconsin, United States:

- Highway 14 from 1917 to 1926, assigned the U.S. Route 8 designation in 1926
- Highway 14 from 1926 to 1933, currently routed as Highway 81 from Cassville to Beloit and Highway 15 from Beloit to Milwaukee

For the highway in Wisconsin numbered 14 since 1933, see U.S. Route 14.
