= Wisconsin Highway 135 =

Highway in the U.S. state of Wisconsin

State Trunk Highway 135

Route information
- Length: 5.2 mi (8.4 km)
- Existed: 1957–1990

Major junctions
- South end: WIS 59 in Palmyra
- North end: WIS 106 near Hebron

Location
- Country: United States
- State: Wisconsin
- Counties: Jefferson

Highway system
- Wisconsin State Trunk Highway System; Interstate; US; State; Scenic; Rustic
← WIS 134	→ WIS 136
← I-90	WIS 90	→ WIS 91

State Trunk Highway 135 (WIS 135) was a state highway in the U.S. state of Wisconsin. At its latest routing, it traveled from WIS 59 in Palmyra to WIS 106 near Hebron.

== Route description ==
At its latest routing, WIS 135 began in WIS 59 in Palmyra. Then. it traveled northwestward and then northward. After that, WIS 135 intersected WIS 106 in between Hebron and Oak Hill. At this point, the route ended there.

== History ==
=== Original alignment ===
Initially, in 1923, WIS 135 was established along a series of current County Trunk Highways from WIS 29 (now WIS 23) near Big Spring to WIS 10 (later US 51, now CTH-M) in Packwaukee. Later, in 1924, WIS 135 was extended westward to WIS 13/WIS 29 (now WIS 13/WIS 16) in Kilbourn (now Wisconsin Dells). In 1934, WIS 135 was slightly truncated in favor of US 51's Packwaukee and Buffalo bypass. In 1939, WIS 135 was rerouted northward to directly connect to US 51/WIS 23. In 1948, the route then moved northward away from Wisconsin Dells, superseding CTH-H in the process. In 1955, WIS 135 was decommissioned after WIS 82 extended east onto the newly-built Wisconsin River crossing. This extension resulted in a portion of WIS 71 and the entirety of WIS 135 being superseded by WIS 82.

=== Wisconsin Highway 90 alignment ===
State Trunk Highway 90
- Location: Palmyra–Ixonia
- Length: 22.6 mi (36.4 km)
- Existed: 1919–1957

In 1919, WIS 90 was formed to travel from WIS 99 (now WIS 59) in Palmyra to WIS 19 (now WIS 16) in Ixonia. During its existence, no significant changes have been made to the routing.

In 1957, WIS 90 had to be replaced with WIS 135 due to the introduction of Interstate 90. At this routing, it traveled from WIS 59 in Palmyra to US 16 (now WIS 16) in Ixonia. In the mid-1980s, a large portion of WIS 135, from WIS 106 to WIS 16, was removed in favor of local control (replaced by CTH-F). In 1990, the rest of the route was removed in favor of the realignment of WIS 106. The numbering has not been in use ever since.

== Major intersections ==
The entire highway was in Jefferson County.

Location	mi	km	Destinations	Notes
Palmyra	0.0	0.0	WIS 59	Southern terminus
	5.2	8.4	WIS 106	Northern terminus
1.000 mi = 1.609 km; 1.000 km = 0.621 mi
