= Wisconsin Highway 69 =

Highway in Wisconsin

State Trunk Highway 69
- WIS 69; mainline in red, business route in blue

Route information
- Maintained by WisDOT
- Length: 40.78 mi (65.63 km)

Major junctions
- South end: IL 26 in Monroe
- North end: US 18 / US 151 in Verona

Location
- Country: United States
- State: Wisconsin
- Counties: Green, Dane

Highway system
- Wisconsin State Trunk Highway System; Interstate; US; State; Scenic; Rustic
← WIS 68	→ WIS 70

State Trunk Highway 69 (often called Highway 69, STH-69 or WIS 69) is a state highway in the U.S. state of Wisconsin. It runs north–south in south central Wisconsin from the Illinois border near Monroe to Verona.

== Route description ==
WIS 69 begins in Green County at the Illinois border near Clarno. At the state line, WIS 69 turns into Illinois Route 26 (IL 26), which runs southward to Freeport. WIS 69 continues north to Monroe, where it runs through the city along 7th Avenue. Near the northern edge of Monroe, WIS 69 meets WIS 11 and WIS 81 at a diamond interchange. WIS 69 runs concurrently with WIS 11 and WIS 81, temporarily going east–west rather than its natural north–south direction, for about half a mile. This segment is the only limited-access freeway stretch of WIS 69. WIS 69 splits off at another diamond interchange just east of the first, and turns back northward towards Monticello. WIS 69 passes west of downtown through Monticello. Between Monticello and New Glarus, WIS 69 passes by New Glarus Woods State Park and the New Glarus Brewing Company, the second largest brewing company in Wisconsin. In New Glarus, WIS 69 intersects WIS 39 just east of downtown, before exiting the community to the north. Three miles (4.8 km) north of New Glarus, WIS 69 enters Dane County.

About one mile (1.6 km) north of the county line, WIS 92 joins WIS 69, and the two highways run concurrently for 3.6 miles (5.8 km) into Belleville, tracking east–west rather than north–south. WIS 69 and WIS 92 enter Belleville on Main Street, passing straight through downtown. WIS 69 then turns northward onto River Street, while WIS 92 stays on Main Street for one more block. After turning onto River Street, WIS 69 crosses the Sugar River and passes by Lake Belle View before continuing northward out of the community. WIS 69 passes through the unincorporated communities of Basco and Paoli before reaching the south edge of Verona, where it terminates at a diamond interchange with US 18 and US 151.

WIS 69 is a major two-lane highway for the vast majority of its route, connecting the Madison metropolitan area with Monroe and, via IL 26, Freeport, in addition to serving a few smaller communities. Though WIS 69 is largely two lanes, there are two four lane segments—in Monroe along 7th Avenue and the WIS 11/WIS 81 concurrency, and approaching the US 18/US 151 interchange in Verona.

== Major intersections ==
County	Location	mi	km	Destinations	Notes
Green	Town of Clarno	0.00	0.00	IL 26 south – Freeport	Continuation into Illinois
Green	Monroe	7.64	12.30	WIS 11 west / WIS 81 west – Argyle, Dubuque	Southern end of WIS 11/WIS 81 concurrency
Green	Monroe	8.56	13.78	WIS 11 east / WIS 81 east – Brodhead	Northern end of WIS 11/WIS 81 concurrency
Green	New Glarus	23.72	38.17	WIS 39 west – New Glarus	
Dane	Primrose–Montrose town line	28.02	45.09	WIS 92 north – Mount Horeb	Southern end of WIS 92 concurrency
Dane	Belleville	31.59	50.84	WIS 92 south – Brooklyn	Northern end of WIS 92 concurrency
Dane	Verona	40.78	65.63	US 18 / US 151 – Madison, Mount Horeb	Northern terminus
1.000 mi = 1.609 km; 1.000 km = 0.621 mi: Concurrency terminus
