= Wisconsin Highway 115 =

Former state highway in Wisconsin

State Trunk Highway 115

Route information
- Maintained by WisDOT
- Length: 5.8 mi (9.3 km)
- Existed: 1926–2006

Major junctions
- South end: WIS 60 west of Hustisford
- North end: WIS 26 in Juneau

Location
- Country: United States
- State: Wisconsin

Highway system
- Wisconsin State Trunk Highway System; Interstate; US; State; Scenic; Rustic
← WIS 114	→ WIS 116

State Trunk Highway 115 (often called Highway 115, STH-115 or WIS 115) was a state highway in the U.S. state of Wisconsin. It ran north–south between Hustisford and Juneau. In 2005, the road was turned over to Dodge County, which now maintains it as County Trunk Highway DJ (CTH-DJ).

== History ==
In 1920, WIS 115 was established to travel roughly along WIS 80 from WIS 60 north of Muscoda to WIS 11 (now US 14) in Richland Center. Then, in 1923, without any prior significant changes, the route was relocated in favor of WIS 80's northern extension. After that, WIS 115 appeared along present-day WIS 175 from WIS 15/WIS 55 (now Hilltop Drive) in Meeker to WIS 15/WIS 60 (now Sherman Road) in Ackerville. This route functions like an alternate route of WIS 15. Shortly after paving the entire route with concrete, WIS 15 moved onto WIS 115, superseding this route in the process.

In 1926, WIS 115 was reestablished in response to the introduction of the U.S. Highway System, specifically US 118. Due to the existence of both US 118 and WIS 118, WIS 118 was replaced with WIS 115. It ran along present-day CTH-DJ from WIS 60 west of Hustisford to WIS 26 in Juneau. During this time, no significant changes had been made. In 2006, the route was removed in favor of transferring it to local control (replaced by CTH-DJ).

== Major intersections ==
The entire highway was in Dodge County.

Location	mi	km	Destinations	Notes
Town of Hustisford			WIS 60	
Juneau			WIS 26	
1.000 mi = 1.609 km; 1.000 km = 0.621 mi
