= Wisconsin Highway 68 =

Highway in Wisconsin

State Trunk Highway 68
- WIS 68 highlighted in red

Route information
- Maintained by WisDOT
- Length: 9.51 mi (15.30 km)

Major junctions
- West end: WIS 33 in Fox Lake
- East end: WIS 49 in Waupun

Location
- Country: United States
- State: Wisconsin
- Counties: Dodge

Highway system
- Wisconsin State Trunk Highway System; Interstate; US; State; Scenic; Rustic
← WIS 67	→ WIS 69

State Trunk Highway 68 (often called Highway 68, STH-68 or WIS 68) is a 9.51-mile (15.30 km) state highway in Dodge County in the US state of Wisconsin that runs from WIS 33 in Fox Lake east to WIS 49 in Waupun. WIS 68 is maintained by the Wisconsin Department of Transportation (WisDOT).

== Route description ==
WIS 68 begins at a junction with WIS 33 at the corner of East State Street and Spring Street in downtown Fox Lake. The highway heads east as State Street, running concurrently with County Trunk Highway A (CTH-A) and CTH-C. Heading three blocks west past Fireman's Park on the east side of the city, WIS 68 turns northeast on Waupun Street to East Hamilton Street. East State Street continues southeast out of the city, carrying the two county highways.

WIS 68 continues northeastward through farmland, briefly passing through the Town of Fox Lake before entering the Town of Trenton. After intersections with CTH-FF and CTH-F, the route heads toward Waupun. The road passes an airport outside the city limits before entering the city, where it becomes Fox Lake Road. After passing the Central Wisconsin Christian High School, the highway turns to the north, passing within two blocks of Waupun Memorial Hospital. It continues north for three blocks before terminating at WIS 49, known locally as Main Street, at the Dodge-Fond du Lac county line.

== Major intersections ==
The entire route is in Dodge County.

Location	mi	km	Destinations	Notes
Fox Lake	0.0	0.0	WIS 33 – Beaver Dam, Horicon, Portage	Western terminus
Waupun	9.5	15.3	WIS 49 – Brownsville, US 41, Brandon, Ripon	Eastern terminus
1.000 mi = 1.609 km; 1.000 km = 0.621 mi
