= Wisconsin Highway 43 =

State highway in Wisconsin, United States

State Trunk Highway 43

Route information
- Maintained by WisDOT
- Existed: 1918–1974

Location
- Country: United States
- State: Wisconsin

Highway system
- Wisconsin State Trunk Highway System; Interstate; US; State; Scenic; Rustic
← I-43	→ WIS 44

State Trunk Highway 43 (often called Highway 43, STH-43 or WIS 43) was a number assigned to two different state highways in the U.S. state of Wisconsin:

- Highway 43 from 1917 to 1923, assigned the Highway 27 designation in 1923
- Highway 43 from 1923 to 1974, currently routed as Highway 142 from Burlington to Kenosha
