= Wisconsin Highway 158 =

State highway in Wisconsin, United States

State Trunk Highway 158
- WIS 158 highlighted in red

Route information
- Maintained by WisDOT
- Length: 7.36 mi (11.84 km)

Major junctions
- West end: I-41 / I-94 / US 41 in Kenosha
- WIS 31 in Somers
- East end: WIS 32 / LMCT in Kenosha

Location
- Country: United States
- State: Wisconsin
- Counties: Kenosha

Highway system
- Wisconsin State Trunk Highway System; Interstate; US; State; Scenic; Rustic
← WIS 157	→ WIS 159

State Trunk Highway 158 (often called Highway 158, STH-158 or WIS 158) is a state highway in the U.S. state of Wisconsin. It runs east–west as a suburban-to-urban route, connecting I-94 with downtown Kenosha.

Highway 158 is known as 52nd Street for its entire length. The city of Kenosha uses a numbering system for its streets and avenues, numbering streets in ascending order from the Racine County line to the Illinois state line.

== History ==
52nd Street in Kenosha was designated as Highway 158 in 1958, at about the same time that American Motors began selling cars after the merger of Nash Motors and Hudson Motors. AMC had their main engine plant on 52nd Street, and also had a vehicle "storage" lot on 88th Avenue (County Highway H, then WIS 192) along the Milwaukee Road railway. 52nd Street was extended to the West to I-94 the following year.

Highway 158 connects downtown Kenosha with the Kenosha Regional Airport, and served the now-defunct Dairyland Greyhound Park.

== Major intersections ==
The entire route is in Kenosha, Kenosha County.

mi	km	Destinations	Notes
0.0	0.0	I-41 / I-94 / US 41 – Milwaukee, Chicago	Western terminus; I-94 exit 342
2.1	3.4	CTH-H (88th Ave)	
3.6	5.8	WIS 31 (Green Bay Road)	
6.7	10.8	WIS 32 / LMCT (Sheridan Road)	Eastern terminus
1.000 mi = 1.609 km; 1.000 km = 0.621 mi
