= Balmoral, Wisconsin =

- Unincorporated community
- Location within Wisconsin Location within the United States
- Coordinates: 43°13′33″N 90°27′50″W
- Country: United States
- State: Wisconsin
- County: Richland
- Elevation: 705 ft (215 m)
- Time zone: UTC-6 (Central (CST))
  - Summer (DST): UTC-5 (CDT)
- Area code: 608
- GNIS feature ID: 1957773

Balmoral is an unincorporated community in the town of Eagle, Richland County, Wisconsin, United States. Before being called Balmoral, it was originally named Rodolf's Mill and was later known as Lawson before a post office with the name Balmoral opened in 1889.
