= Woodland, Wisconsin =

Town of Woodland
- Town
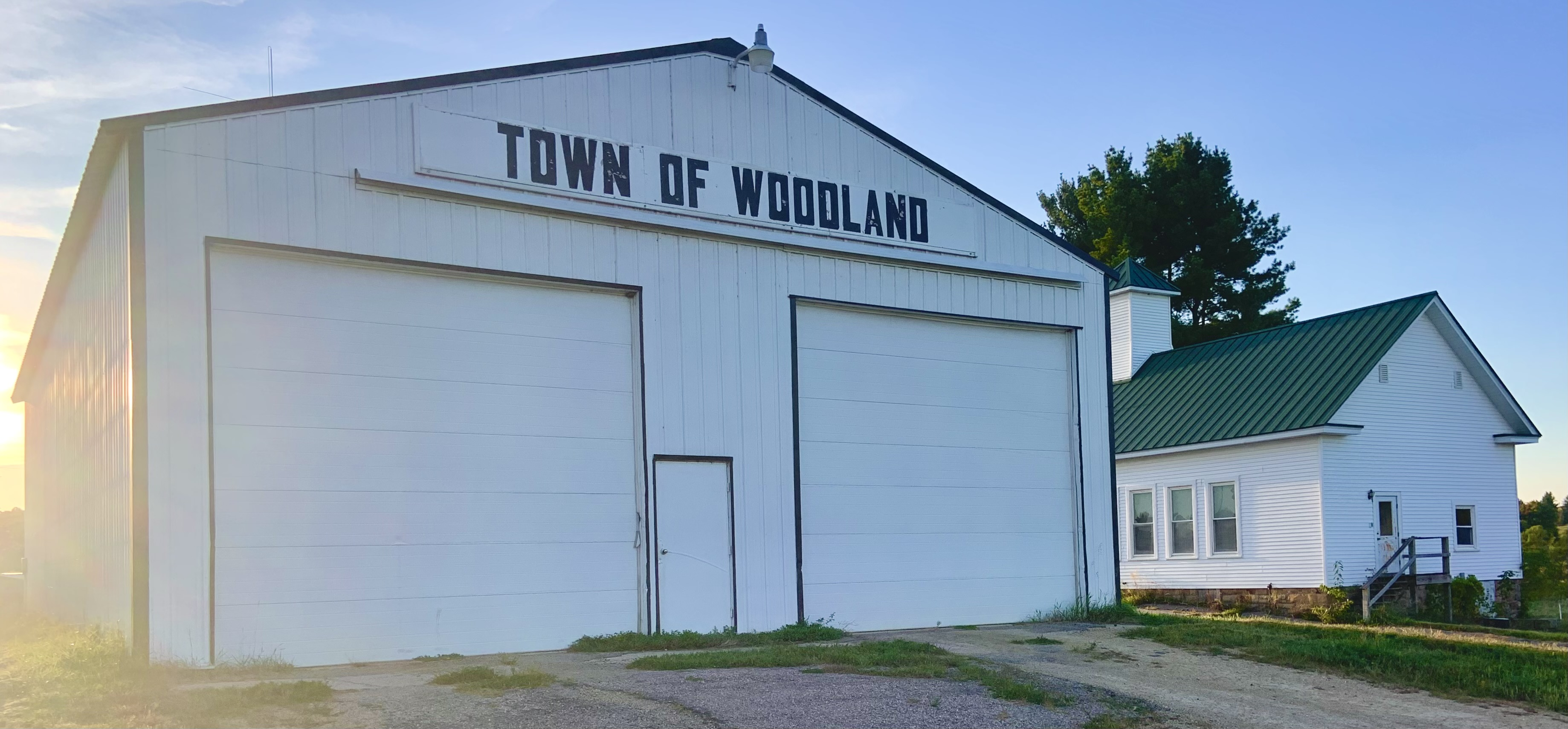
- Town hall

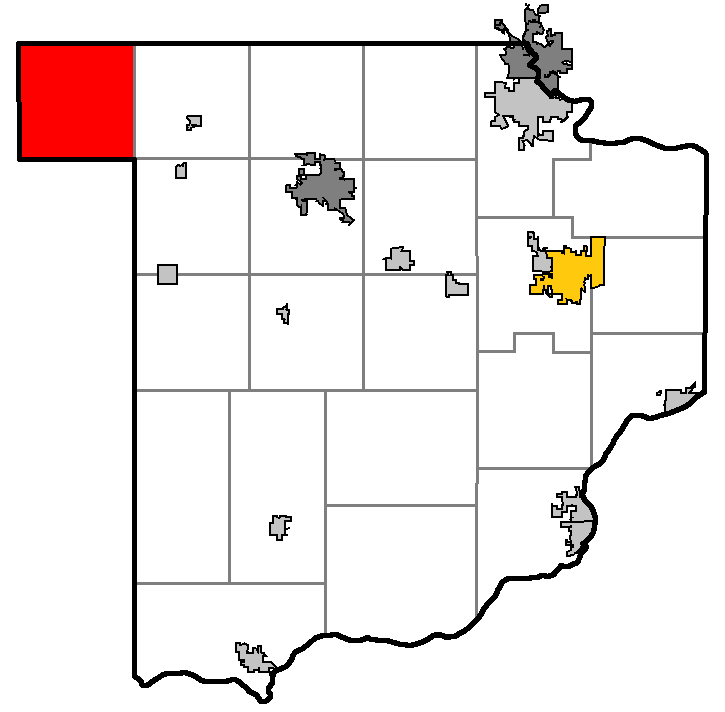
- Location of the Town of Woodland, Wisconsin

- Location of Sauk County, Wisconsin
- Coordinates: 43°35′16″N 90°15′14″W
- Country: United States
- State: Wisconsin
- County: Sauk

Area
  - Total: 36.2 sq mi (93.7 km^{2})
  - Land: 36.1 sq mi (93.4 km^{2})
  - Water: 0.077 sq mi (0.2 km^{2})
- Elevation: 1,191 ft (363 m)

Population (2020)
  - Total: 839
  - Density: 23.3/sq mi (8.98/km^{2})
- Time zone: UTC-6 (Central (CST))
  - Summer (DST): UTC-5 (CDT)
- Area code: 608
- FIPS code: 55-88775
- GNIS feature ID: 1584474
- Website: http://townofwoodland.com

The Town of Woodland is located in Sauk County, Wisconsin, United States. The population was 839 at the 2020 census. The unincorporated community of Valton is located in the town.

== History ==
The town was named from the adjacent dense forests.

It is erroneously thought to be the birthplace of baseball hall of famer Addie Joss, who was actually born in Woodland, Dodge County.

== Geography ==
According to the United States Census Bureau, the town has a total area of 36.2 square miles (93.7 km^{2}), of which 36.1 square miles (93.4 km^{2}) is land and 0.1 square mile (0.2 km^{2}) (0.25%) is water.

== Demographics ==
As of the census of 2000, there were 783 people, 247 households, and 206 families residing in the town. The population density was 21.7 people per square mile (8.4/km^{2}). There were 302 housing units at an average density of 8.4 per square mile (3.2/km^{2}). The racial makeup of the town was 98.21% White, 0.13% African American, and 1.66% from two or more races. Hispanic or Latino of any race were 2.30% of the population.

There were 247 households, out of which 39.7% had children under the age of 18 living with them, 74.5% were married couples living together, 6.1% had a female householder with no husband present, and 16.2% were non-families. 12.6% of all households were made up of individuals, and 4.9% had someone living alone who was 65 years of age or older. The average household size was 3.17 and the average family size was 3.49.

The population was 36.4% under the age of 18, 5.1% from 18 to 24, 24.1% from 25 to 44, 22.5% from 45 to 64, and 11.9% who were 65 years of age or older. The median age was 35 years. For every 100 females, there were 101 males. For every 100 females age 18 and over, there were 98 males.

The median income for a household in the town was $41,000, and the median income for a family was $42,941. Males had a median income of $27,143 versus $20,577 for females. The per capita income for the town was $14,787. About 10.1% of families and 14.8% of the population were below the poverty line, including 27.3% of those under age 18 and 2.8% of those age 65 or over.

== See also ==
- List of towns in Wisconsin
