= McKinley, Taylor County, Wisconsin =

Town in Wisconsin, US

McKinley, Wisconsin
- Town
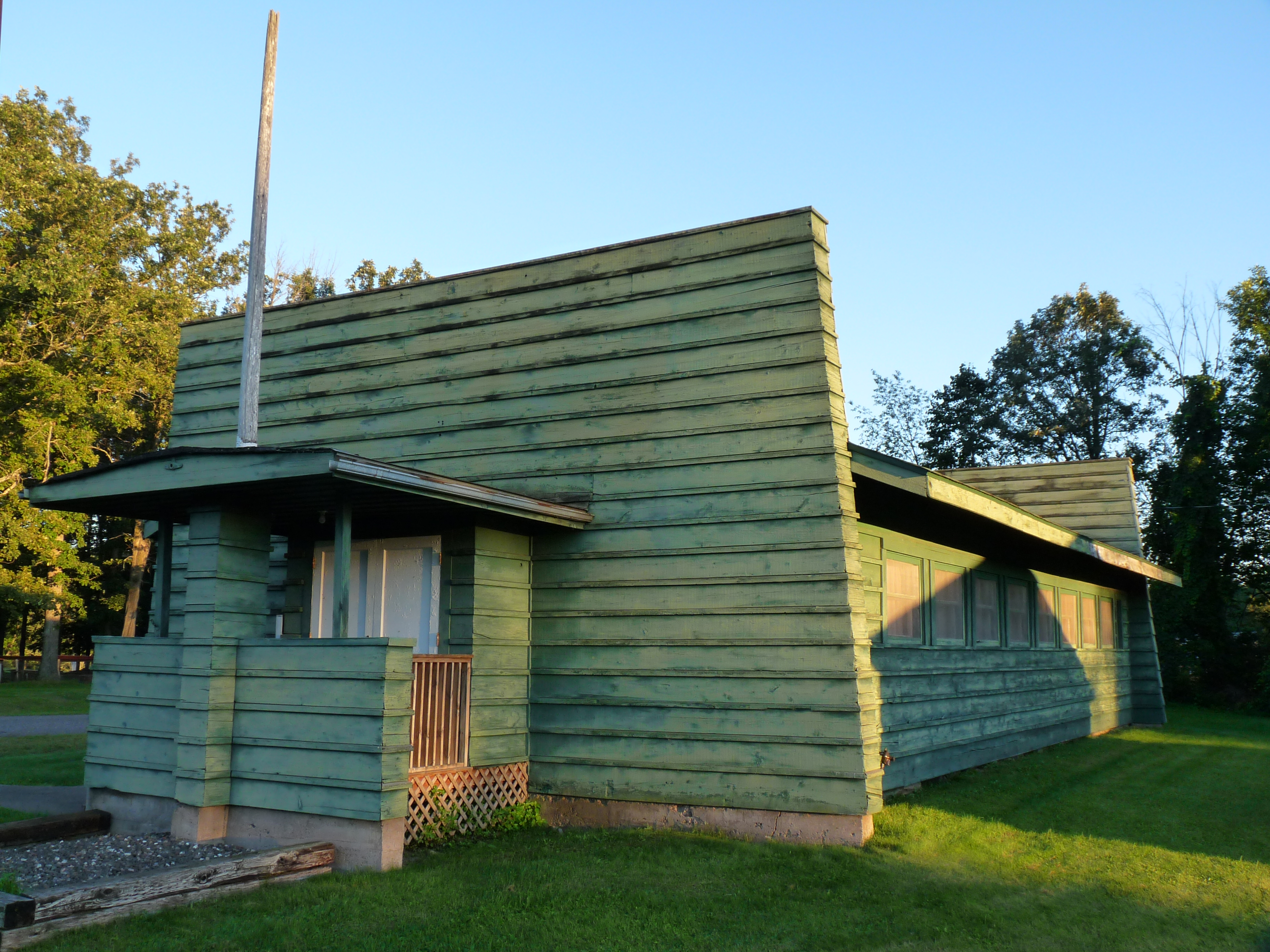
- The McKinley town hall is on the National Register of Historic Places because it was designed by noted Prairie School architects Purcell & Elmslie.

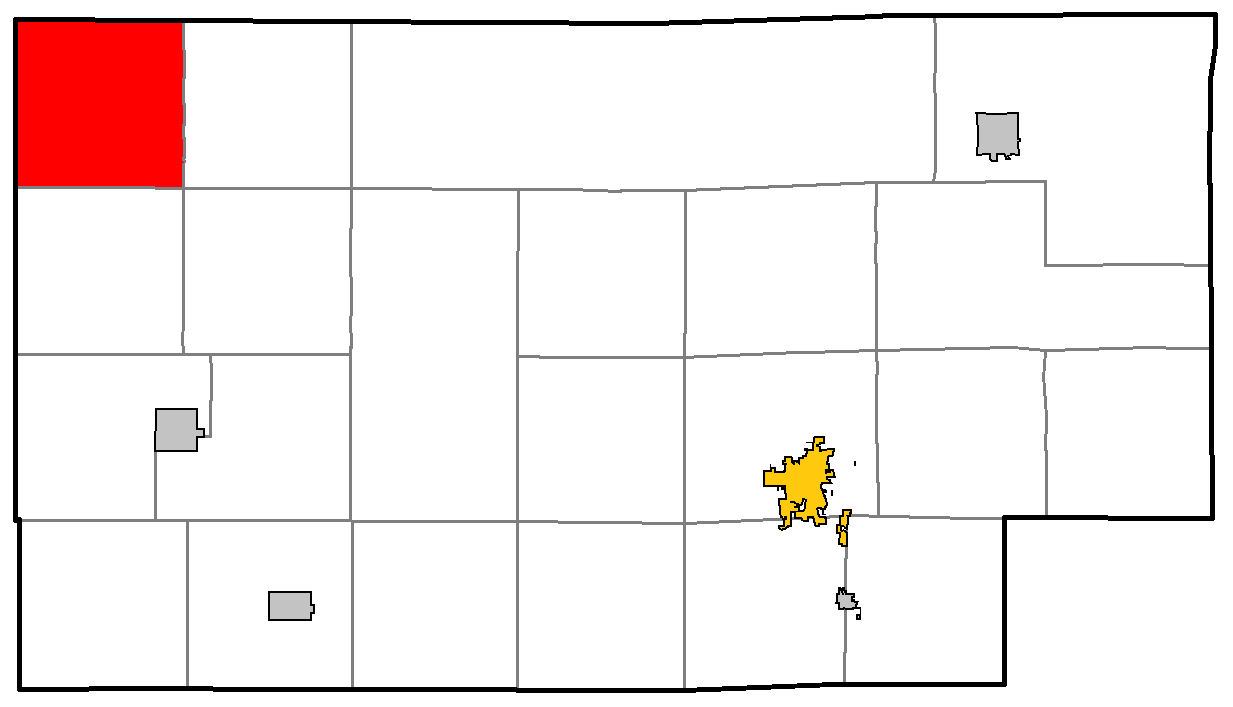
- Location of McKinley, within Taylor County

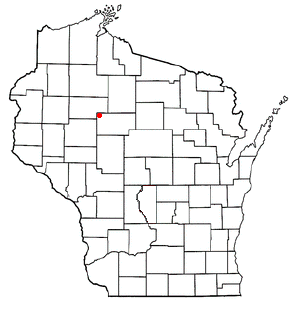
- Location of McKinley, Taylor County, Wisconsin
- Coordinates: 45°20′20″N 90°51′33″W
- Country: United States
- State: Wisconsin
- County: Taylor

Area
  - Total: 35.8 sq mi (92.8 km^{2})
  - Land: 35.8 sq mi (92.6 km^{2})
  - Water: 0.077 sq mi (0.2 km^{2})
- Elevation: 1,188 ft (362 m)

Population (2020)
  - Total: 408
  - Density: 11.4/sq mi (4.41/km^{2})
- Time zone: UTC-6 (Central (CST))
  - Summer (DST): UTC-5 (CDT)
- Area codes: 715 & 534
- FIPS code: 55-46925
- GNIS feature ID: 1583622
- PLSS township: T33N R4W

McKinley is a town in Taylor County, Wisconsin, United States. The population was around 408 at the 2020 census. The census-designated place of Jump River is located partially in the town.

== History ==
Some of the earliest European Americans to walk the six mile square that would become McKinley were the U.S. government's surveyors. In 1847 they surveyed the outline of the township on foot with chain and compass. Then others came back in 1855 to survey all the section lines. When done, the deputy surveyor filed this general description:

This Township contains several Swamps and some of considerable extent. They are all unfit for cultivation. The Meadow and Alder Bottoms are all subject to be overflowed to a depth of 1 too 2 feet And are good for Hay. The Surface is level apart is upland where the Soil is 2d rate. This Township is heavily timbered and is chiefly composed of Hemlock, Yellow Birch, Balsam and White Pine. The undergrowth is generally thick and is composed of Hemlock Balsam and Hazel. Balsam and Elm line the Margins of Meadow and Alder Bottoms. The River Enters the Township near the SE corner of Section 12 and flows a West SouthWesterly course, with a Rapid current and is from 2 too 4 feet deep, and is adapted to the forming of a good motive power for mills. There is no improvements in this Township.

The federal government granted the first land patents in McKinley in 1860, giving four 160-acre parcels along the Jump River in sections 30 and 29 (around the modern Geise/Winger neighborhood) to Belinda Bonesteel and Harrison Hobart. These grants were payment to descendants of Ah-Pashe-Aien, Ke-Woi-Tch-Ke-Tas-Shew, Ky-Sha-Shek and Ky-Ny-Wack-Um, who had served in the Black Hawk War in Captain Augustin Grignon's Menominee Volunteers thirty years before. Apparently they had sold their long-awaited payment for their military service to Bonesteel and Hobart. The largest grantee was Ezra Cornell, who received many half-sections in McKinley in 1868 and 1869 to help finance the new Cornell University under the Morrill Land-Grant Colleges Act.

A c. 1888 map of the square that would become McKinley shows no roads and no settlers. At that time only a few forties were still owned by the government. Most were in private hands, with the largest landowners being Cornell University, Chippewa Lumber and Boom, J. Paul and M.W. Simmonds.

In 1902 a town of McKinley was carved out of the larger town of Westboro, which had previously spanned the width of Taylor County. This McKinley included the present-day towns of McKinley and Jump River until 1923. Then the town of Jump River was split off, leaving McKinley with its present boundaries.

Around 1904 McKinley gained a new connection to the outside world when the Stanley, Merrill and Phillips Railroad built its track arcing across the east side of the township and down along the river bottom to Jump River. With that means of transport in place, the Northwestern Lumber Company began logging in the area, with temporary railroad spurs reaching to logging camps scattered around the township. Spur 5 followed the course of modern Spur Road/Spur 5 east of Sunnyside Road, then continued to the Jump River. West of Sunnyside Spur 5 generally ran south of modern Spur Road, with temporary branches to different logging camps, and eventually connected with the Owen and Northern Railroad south of Sheldon. Spur 4 branched out through the part of the township north of the river. A timetable from 1906 indicates that the train from Stanley steamed through the township around 10:30am every day except Sunday, then chugged up from the river and headed back south around noon.

Starting in 1906 a developer T.H. Field tried to create a village of Field in McKinley, kitty-corner across the river and the railroad from the new community of Jump River. He had the town platted and managed to establish a post office named Field and perhaps some sort of hotel, some homes, and a sawmill. But he couldn't get the SM&P to stop on his side of the river, and his dream eventually grew up in weeds.

The 1911 plat map shows the SM&P again, but now with a further rail segment north of the river heading toward Walrath. That 1911 map shows only a few roads. A few settlers had homes along the river and along what would become the east end of Buckhorn Road. The rest of the township was owned by lumber companies, with the Northwestern Lumber Company owning over half the land. This is in contrast to down by Gilman, which the same plat book shows was filling in, and over by Medford where the Wisconsin Central had been operating for almost forty years, where some townships were nearly completely settled by this time. McKinley was late to settle.

Town of McKinley town hall in about 1920

== Geography ==
According to the United States Census Bureau, the town has a total area of 35.8 square miles (92.8 km^{2}), of which 35.8 square miles (92.6 km^{2}) is land and 0.1 square mile (0.2 km^{2}) (0.20%) is water.

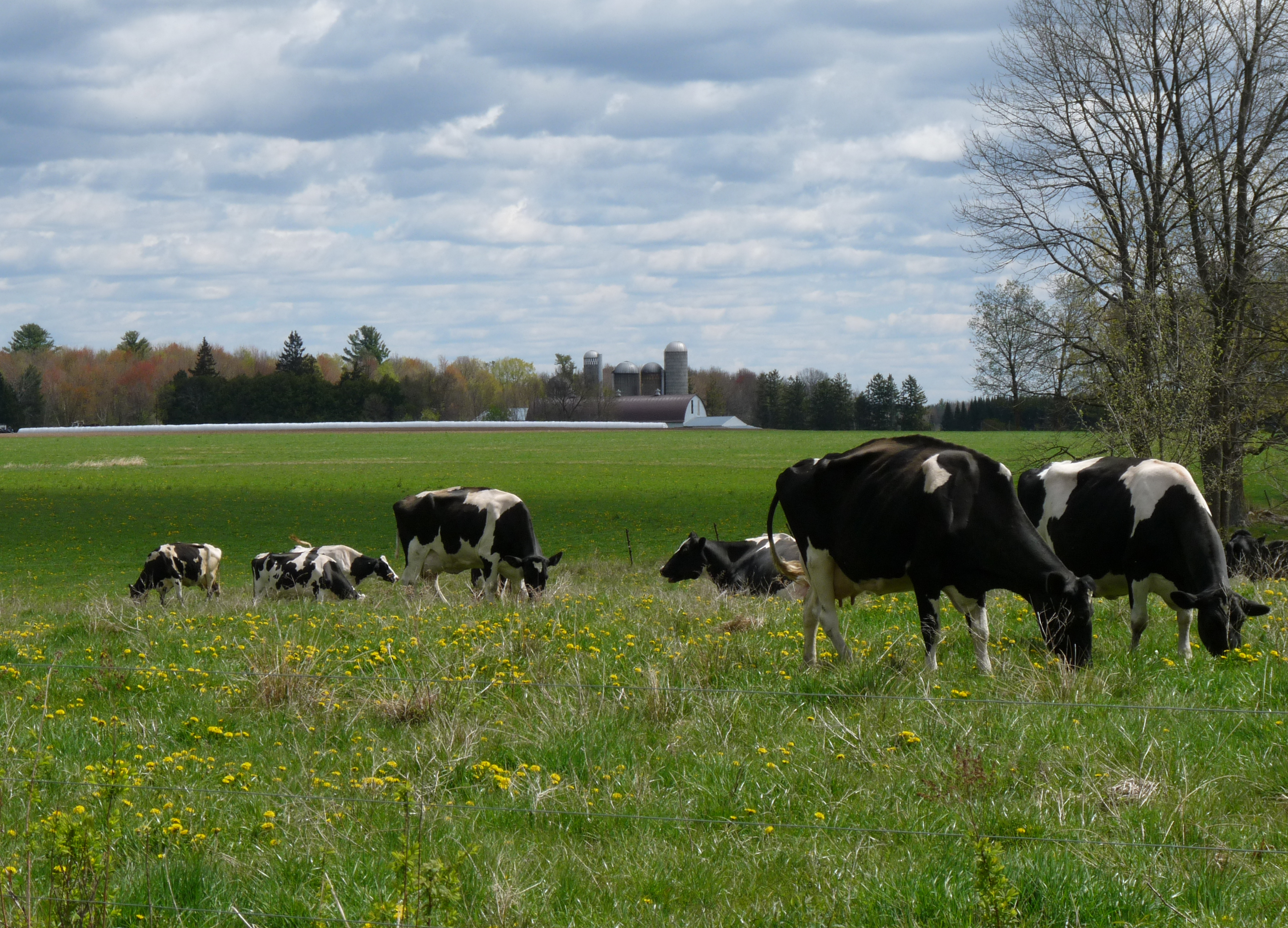
Terrain in the north and west is fairly flat, but the southeast is rolling hills. The town's economy is shifting from dairy to growing corn and soybeans.

The Jump River, Alder Creek, and Shoulder Creek flow through the township, all generally heading to the west-southwest. The part of the township north of the river is dominated by low ridges running parallel to the river. These could be drumlins left by a glacial advance, or they could mask shapes of the rock beneath the glacial till. South of the river the land is mostly gently rolling glacial till, interrupted by patches of hills, with heavier soil in the low spots.

Several man-made flowages are in a part of the Pershing Wildlife Area on the southern edge of the town.

== Demographics ==
As of the census of 2000, there were 418 people, 139 households, and 104 families residing in the town. The population density was 11.7 people per square mile (4.5/km^{2}). There were 186 housing units at an average density of 5.2 per square mile (2.0/km^{2}). The racial makeup of the town was 99.76% white, and 0.24% from two or more races.

There were 139 households, out of which 37.4% had children under the age of 18 living with them, 61.9% were married couples living together, 7.9% had a female householder with no husband present, and 24.5% were non-families. 19.4% of all households were made up of individuals, and 8.6% had someone living alone who was 65 years of age or older. The average household size was 3.01 and the average family size was 3.50.

In the town, the population was spread out, with 34.4% under the age of 18, 5.5% from 18 to 24, 28.5% from 25 to 44, 18.9% from 45 to 64, and 12.7% who were 65 years of age or older. The median age was 34 years. For every 100 females, there were 102.9 males. For every 100 females age 18 and over, there were 98.6 males.

The median income for a household in the town was $36,528, and the median income for a family was $43,906. Males had a median income of $22,303 versus $23,333 for females. The per capita income for the town was $16,276. About 6.7% of families and 13.3% of the population were below the poverty line, including 17.6% of those under age 18 and 10.3% of those age 65 or over.

== See also ==
- List of towns in Wisconsin
