= Sparta/Fort McCoy Airport =

- IATA: CMY; ICAO: KCMY; FAA LID: CMY

Summary
- Airport type: Public/military
- Owner: U.S. Army
- Location: Sparta, Wisconsin
- Time zone: CST (UTC−06:00)
  - Summer (DST): CDT (UTC−05:00)
- Elevation AMSL: 839 ft / 256 m
- Coordinates: 43°57′31″N 090°44′16″W

Map
- Location of airport in Wisconsin CMY (the United States)

Runways
Direction	Length		Surface
Direction	ft	m	Surface
11/29	4,697	1,432	Asphalt
1/19	3,032	924	Asphalt

Helipads
Number	Length		Surface
Number	ft	m	Surface
H1	100	30	Asphalt
H2	100	30	Asphalt

Statistics
- Aircraft operations (2022): 6,000
- Based aircraft (2024): 23
- Source: Federal Aviation Administration

Sparta/Fort McCoy Airport (IATA: CMY, ICAO: KCMY, FAA LID: CMY) is a public and military use airport located in Monroe County, Wisconsin, United States, three nautical miles (6 km) northeast of Sparta. The airport is used heavily by the U.S. Army, accounting for 75% of traffic operations, primarily transient military aircraft supporting operations at nearby Fort McCoy, which is a major training facility. It is included in the Federal Aviation Administration (FAA) National Plan of Integrated Airport Systems for 2025–2029, in which it is categorized as a local general aviation facility.

== Facilities and aircraft ==
Sparta/Fort McCoy Airport covers an area of 640 acres (259 ha) at an elevation of 839 feet (256 m) above mean sea level. It has two runways with asphalt surfaces: the primary runway 11/29 is 4,697 by 100 feet (1,432 x 30 m) and the crosswind runway 1/19 is 3,032 by 95 feet (924 x 29 m). The airport also has two asphalt helipads, on Runway 11/29 and taxiway Charlie, both measuring 100 by 100 feet (30 x 30 m), respectively.

For the 12-month period ending June 22, 2022, the airport had 6,000 aircraft operations, an average of 16 per day: 50% military and 50% general aviation. In July 2024, there were 23 aircraft based at this airport: 22 single-engine and 1 helicopter.

== See also ==
- List of airports in Wisconsin
