= List of Interstate Highways in Wisconsin =

Interstate Highways of the Wisconsin State Trunk Highway System
- Highway marker for Interstate 94 and Interstate 894
- Interstate Highways highlighted in red

System information
- Length: 1,099.11 mi (1,768.85 km)
- Formed: June 29, 1956

Highway names
- Interstates: Interstate nn (I-nn)

System links
- Wisconsin State Trunk Highway System; Interstate; US; State; Scenic; Rustic

The Interstate Highways in Wisconsin comprise five current primary Interstate Highways and three auxiliary Interstates.

== Primary Interstate Highways ==
Number	Length (mi)	Length (km)	Southern or western terminus	Northern or eastern terminus	Formed	Removed	Notes
I-39	182.14	293.13	I-39/I-90 near Beloit	US 51/WIS 29 in Rothschild	1992	current	
I-41	175.43	282.33	I-94/I-41/US 41 near Russell, IL	I-43 and US 41/US 141 in Howard	2015	current	Overlaps US 41 in the state
I-43	191.55	308.27	I-39/I-90 and WIS 81 in Beloit	US 41/US 141 in Howard	1981	current	
I-90	187.13	301.16	I-90 in La Crosse	I-39/I-90 in Beloit	1956	current	
I-94	348.23	560.42	I-94/US 12 in Hudson	I-94/I-41/US 41 near Russell, IL	1956	current	

== Auxiliary Interstate Highways ==
Number	Length (mi)	Length (km)	Southern or western terminus	Northern or eastern terminus	Formed	Removed	Notes
I-535	1.21	1.95	US 53 and WIS 35 in Superior	I-535/US 53 at Duluth, MN	1971	current	Follows the John A. Blatnik Bridge and continues another 1.57 miles (2.53 km) to I-35 in Duluth
I-794	3.50	5.63	I-43/I-94/US 41 in Milwaukee	WIS 794 in Milwaukee	1980	current	Called the Lake Freeway and the East–West Freeway
I-894	9.92	15.96	I-94 and US 45 in West Allis	I-43/I-94 in Milwaukee	1966	current	Completely concurrent with I-41, part concurrent with I-43 called the Airport Freeway.
