= Wisconsin Highway 166 =

Former state highway in Wisconsin, United States

State Trunk Highway 166
- Fond du Lac Avenue

Route information
- Length: 2.1 mi (3.4 km)
- Existed: 1927–1953

Major junctions
- South end: US 45 / WIS 55
- North end: WIS 74 in Menomonee Falls

Location
- Country: United States
- State: Wisconsin

Highway system
- Wisconsin State Trunk Highway System; Interstate; US; State; Scenic; Rustic
← WIS 165	→ WIS 167

Wisconsin Highway 166 (WIS 166) was a state highway in the Milwaukee metropolitan area in Wisconsin. The route traveled in a southeast–northwest direction from US 45/WIS 55 to WIS 74 in Menomonee Falls (now just Main Street). WIS 166 was removed in 1953 when US 41 moved over.

== Route description ==
Starting at US 45/WIS 55 (now WIS 145), WIS 166 traveled northwest along Fond du Lac Avenue. After 2.1 miles (3.4 km), the route ended at WIS 74 (Main Street) in Menomonee Falls.

== History ==
In 1926, WIS 55 moved north along WIS 155 to bypass Menomonee Falls; WIS 155 was subsequently removed and WIS 165 was formed along the northern part of the former alignment of WIS 55, located north of Menomonee Falls. About a year after the realignment, WIS 166 was formed along the southern part of the same former alignment, located south of Menomonee Falls. WIS 166 was removed in 1953 after US 41 moved north along a newly built divided highway, which was situated just north of WIS 166.

== Major intersections ==
The entire route is in Menomonee Falls.

County	mi	km	Destinations	Notes
Milwaukee–Waukesha county line	0.0	0.0	US 45 / WIS 55	Southeastern terminus
Waukesha	2.1	3.4	WIS 74 (Main Street)	Northwestern terminus
1.000 mi = 1.609 km; 1.000 km = 0.621 mi
