= Tri-County News =

Tri-County News: masy refer to the following newspapers in the United States:

- Tri-County News (Kiel, Wisconsin)
- Tri-County News (Osseo, Wisconsin), a newspaper in Wisconsin
- Tri-County News (Gackle, North Dakota), as newspaper in North Dakota
