= Wisconsin Highway 172 =

State highway in Brown County, Wisconsin, United States

State Trunk Highway 172
- WIS-172 highlighted in red

Route information
- Maintained by WisDOT
- Length: 11.63 mi (18.72 km)

Major junctions
- West end: WIS 54 / CTH-E in Hobart
- I-41 / US 41 in Ashwaubenon
- East end: I-43 in Bellevue

Location
- Country: United States
- State: Wisconsin
- Counties: Brown

Highway system
- Wisconsin State Trunk Highway System; Interstate; US; State; Scenic; Rustic
← WIS 171	→ WIS 173

State Trunk Highway 172 (often called Highway 172, STH-172 or WIS 172) is a state highway in the U.S. state of Wisconsin. It is a freeway from Interstate 41 (I-41) / U.S. Highway 41 (US 41) to I-43, providing a southern bypass of Green Bay. West of I-41/US-41, it continues as a surface road past the Green Bay–Austin Straubel International Airport towards Highway 54.

== Route description ==
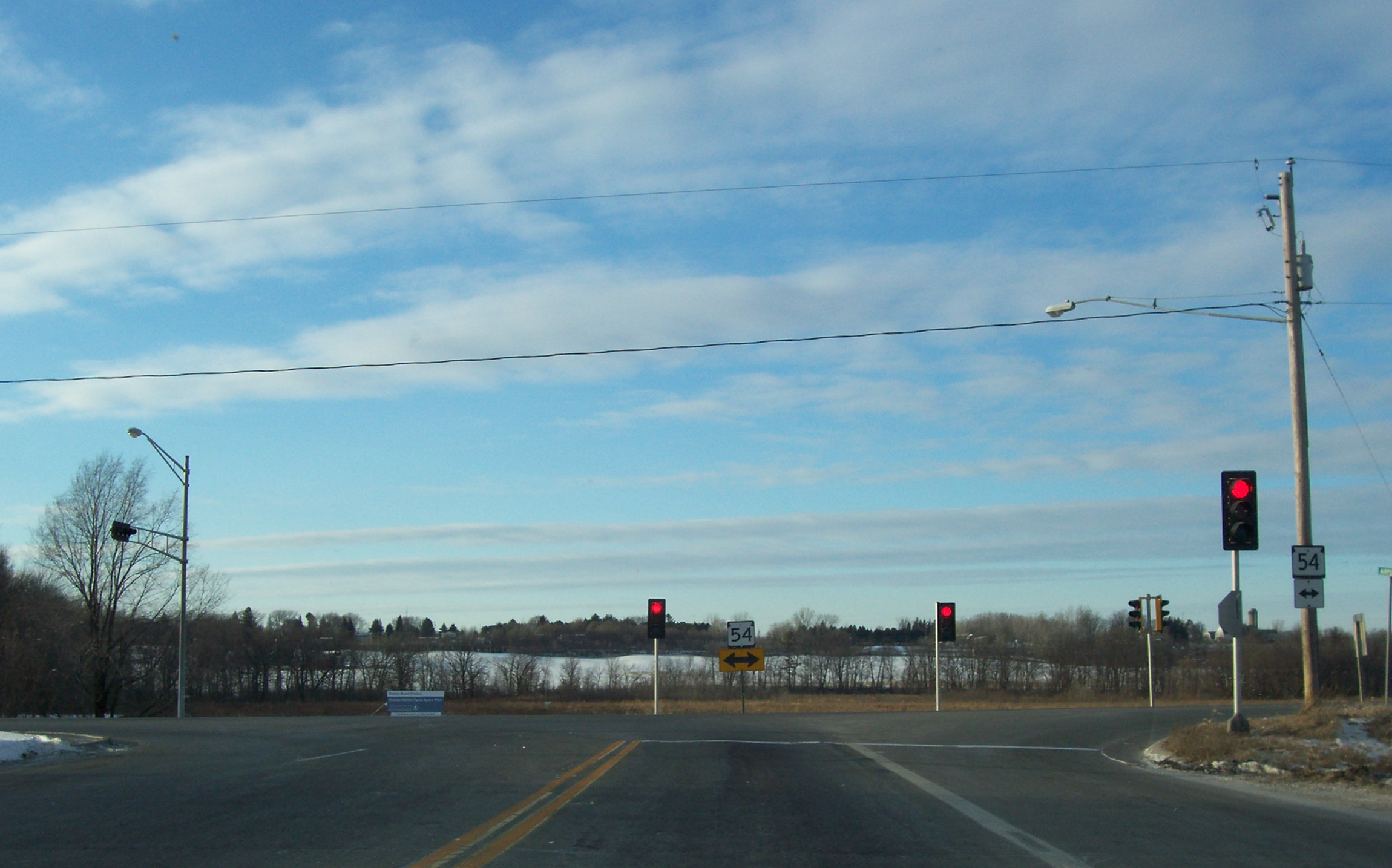
Western terminus

WIS 172 begins at a junction with WIS 54 in Hobart. From here, the road heads east as a surface road known as Airport Drive. After intersecting County Highway GE at a traffic circle, the highway enters Ashwaubenon, where it passes Green Bay–Austin Straubel International Airport. WIS 172 meets County Highway EB near the airport before becoming a freeway. After junctions with I-41 / US 41 and WIS 32, the route crosses the Fox River and enters Allouez. In Allouez, the freeway intersects WIS 57 before crossing the East River. The route has an exit at County Highway GV (Monroe Drive) before terminating at I-43 in Bellevue.

== History ==
The highway first appeared in 1975 with the completion of the six-lane Fox River span between Ashwaubenon and Allouez. By 1984, the freeway was extended easterly to its terminus at Interstate 43, which along with US 41 and I-43 completed the circular bypass of Green Bay. In 1988, STH-172 attained its current length of 11.6 miles after a westerly extension to Oneida at Wisconsin 54.

A large-scale two-year reconstruction project of the Fox River bridge deck and its approaches, costing $37 million, has been completed. The westbound portion opened in 2009 and the eastbound section by August 2010.

== Major intersections ==
The entire route is in Brown County. All exits are unnumbered.

Location	mi	km	Destinations	Notes
Hobart	0.0	0.0	WIS 54 / CTH-E	Western terminus
Ashwaubenon			Western end of freeway section	
Ashwaubenon	5.2	8.4	I-41 / US 41 – Appleton, Marinette	Exit 164B on I-41
Ashwaubenon	6.3	10.1	WIS 32 (Ashland Avenue) / Oneida Street	
Allouez	7.4	11.9	WIS 57 (Riverside Drive) / CTH-X (Webster Avenue)	
Bellevue	10.0	16.1	CTH-GV (Monroe Road)	
Bellevue	11.63	18.72	I-43 – Sturgeon Bay, Milwaukee	Eastern terminus; exit 180 on I-43
1.000 mi = 1.609 km; 1.000 km = 0.621 mi
