= Wisconsin Highway 167 =

Highway in Wisconsin

State Trunk Highway 167
- WIS 167 highlighted in red

Route information
- Maintained by WisDOT
- Length: 24.96 mi (40.17 km)

Major junctions
- West end: WIS 83 in Hartford
- I-41 / US 41 / US 45 in Germantown
- East end: I-43 / WIS 32 / WIS 57 / LMCT in Mequon

Location
- Country: United States
- State: Wisconsin
- Counties: Washington, Ozaukee

Highway system
- Wisconsin State Trunk Highway System; Interstate; US; State; Scenic; Rustic
← WIS 166	→ WIS 168

State Trunk Highway 167 (often called Highway 167, STH-167 or WIS 167) is a 24.96-mile (40.17 km) state highway in southern Washington and Ozaukee counties in the US state of Wisconsin. It runs east–west in the southeastern part of the state from Hartford to Mequon and runs concurrently with Interstate 41/US Highway 41/US Highway 45 (I-41/US 41/US 45) in Germantown. The highway was first numbered west of then-US 41 between 1939 and 1944 then extended to Mequon between 1948 and 1956. It initially had a concurrency with WIS 145 but was rerouted to its current one with I-41/US 41/US 45 in 1983.

== Route description ==
WIS 167 begins at WIS 83 in Erin south of Hartford as a continuation of County Trunk Highway O (CTH-O) in Washington. In Erin, it intersects with CTH-K and CTH-CC. At its intersection with CTH-CC, it enters Richfield. In Hubertus, the Catholic shrine of Holy Hill National Shrine of Mary, Help of Christians, is located on WIS 167. WIS 167 travels in an east–west direction through Richfield, where it intersects WIS 164 and WIS 175. As it approaches the interchange with Interstate 41/US Highway 41/US Highway 45 (I-41/US 41/US 45) at exit 57 at Richfield's border with Germantown, it becomes a multi-lane divided highway before merging onto the southbound freeway. The freeway then curves southeast to enter Germantown.

At the next freeway exit (exit 54), WIS 167 departs the freeway, running as a continuation of CTH-Y eastward as a divided highway until starting a short concurrency with WIS 145, after which it continues east into Ozaukee County and the city of Mequon. In Mequon, WIS 167 continues east, becoming divided again just west of its intersection with WIS 181. The highway remains divided for the rest of its route, running concurrenctly with WIS 57 and intersecting CTH-W before ending at exit 85 on I-43; at that interchange, WIS 57 turns northward along I-43 and roadway continues eastward as Mequon Road.

== History ==
WIS 167 was first designated between 1939 and 1944, running along its present-day alignment between WIS 83 and what was then US 41 in Richfield. The section had previously been designated as CTH-P. Between 1948 and 1956, the highway was extended. It would continue east along its existing alignment until intersecting WIS 145, at which point it would run southeast concurrently with WIS 145 until just south of Germantown from where it would run east from WIS 145 to WIS 32 in Mequon. In 1983, the highway was rerouted in Germantown to a concurrency with US 41/US 45 west of the existing one with WIS 145 which had its length reduced significantly.

== Major intersections ==
County	Location	mi	km	Destinations	Notes
Washington	Town of Erin	0.0	0.0	WIS 83 – Hartford, Hartland CTH-O west	Western terminus; roadway continues as CTH-O
Washington	Town of Erin	1.6	2.6	CTH-K	
Washington	Richfield–Erin line	3.7	6.0	CTH-CC	
Washington	Richfield	5.7	9.2	WIS 164	
Washington	Richfield	9.3	15.0	WIS 175 – Slinger, Menomonee Falls	
Washington	Germantown	9.7	15.6	I-41 north / US 41 north / US 45 north – Fond du Lac	Northern end of I-41/US 41/US 45 concurrency; exit 57 on I-41/US 41/US 45
Washington	Germantown	12.9	20.8	I-41 south / US 41 south / US 45 south – Milwaukee	Southern end of I-41/US 41/US 45 concurrency; exit 54 on I-41/US 41/US 45
Washington	Germantown	15.4	24.8	WIS 145 north (Pilgrim Road)	Western end of WIS 145 concurrency
Washington	Germantown	15.7	25.3	WIS 145 south (Fond du Lac Avenue)	Eastern end of WIS 145 concurrency
Ozaukee	Mequon	20.4	32.8	WIS 181 (Wauwatosa Road)	
Ozaukee	Mequon	21.5	34.6	WIS 57 south (Cedarburg Road)	Western end of WIS 57 concurrency
Ozaukee	Mequon	24.4	39.3	CTH-W	
Ozaukee	Mequon	24.5	39.4	I-43 / WIS 32 / WIS 57 north / LMCT – Sheboygan, Green Bay, Milwaukee; Mequon Road	Eastern end of WIS 57 concurrency; eastern terminus; roadway continues as Mequon Road
1.000 mi = 1.609 km; 1.000 km = 0.621 mi: Concurrency terminus
