= Wisconsin Highway 165 =

State highway in Pleasant Prairie, Wisconsin, United States

State Trunk Highway 165
- WIS 165 highlighted in red

Route information
- Maintained by WisDOT
- Length: 6.7 mi (10.8 km)

Major junctions
- West end: I-41 / I-94 / US 41 / CTH-Q in Pleasant Prairie
- East end: WIS 32 / LMCT in Pleasant Prairie

Location
- Country: United States
- State: Wisconsin
- Counties: Kenosha

Highway system
- Wisconsin State Trunk Highway System; Interstate; US; State; Scenic; Rustic
← WIS 164	→ WIS 166

State Trunk Highway 165 (STH-165, commonly known as Highway 165 or WIS 65) is a highway in far southeastern Wisconsin connecting Pleasant Prairie, south of Kenosha, with Interstate 94/Interstate 41/US Highway 41 (I-94/I-41/US 41); the roadway continues westward as County Trunk Highway Q (CTH-Q) until it ends at US 45 near Pikeville. The areas served by this connecting route are a commercial area near the Interstate which is adjacent to a growing industrial park between the Interstate and WIS 31 (Green Bay Road) to the east; and a predominantly residential area between WIS 31 and WIS 32 (Sheridan Road) near the shore of Lake Michigan.

== Route description ==
WIS 165 runs east-west in Pleasant Prairie. Between its eastern terminus at WIS 32 and WIS 31, it is an undivided highway. West of WIS 31, it becomes a multi-lane divided highway until its western terminus at an interchange with I-41/I-94/US 41. West of I-41/I-94/US 41, it continues west as CTH-Q.

== History ==
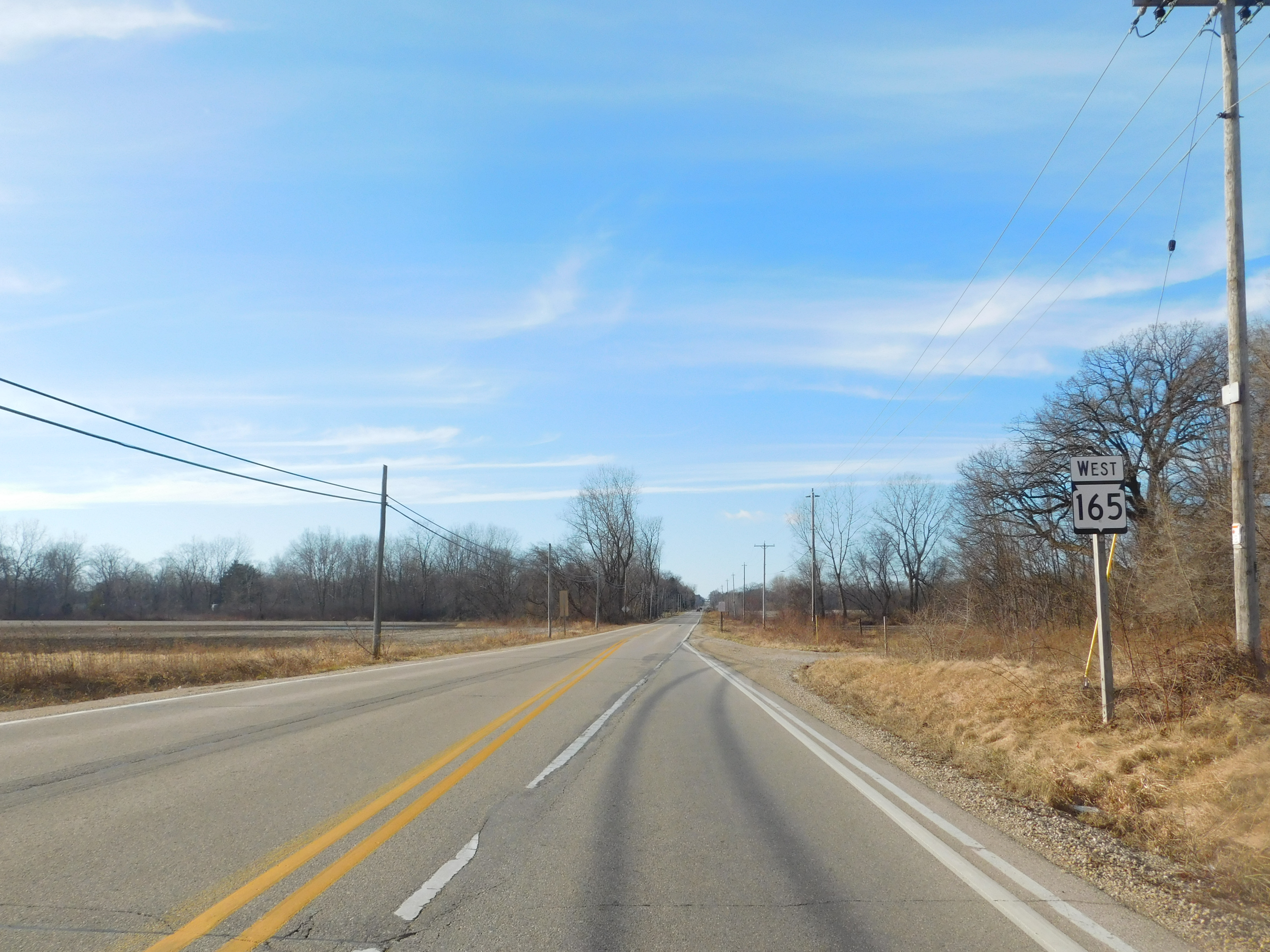
WIS 165 westbound from WIS 32 in Pleasant Prairie

The first WIS 165 in Wisconsin was a short connector between US 41 and WIS 55 in the present-day village of Germantown in 1926. In 1953, the designation was removed from this stretch of highway when the US 41/US 45 concurrency was routed to its present alignment.

Before it was numbered as a Wisconsin Highway, much of the current WIS 165 was designated as CTH-Q. A section near the Des Plaines River was constructed in 1988. The current WIS 165 was numbered in 1990, the same year nearby WIS 174 was decommissioned. In 2017, the section between Corporate Drive and Terwall Terrace was widened to four lanes, making all of the highway west of WIS 31 four lanes.

In 2006-2007, the Wisconsin Department of Transportation (WisDOT) conducted a study to evaluate the impacts of widening WIS 165 between WIS 31 and WIS 32 to a four-lane road with the intention of improving traffic flow and safety. The study recommended the section be widened to four lanes and roundabouts be constructed at three intersections.

== Major intersections ==
The entire route is in Pleasant Prairie, Kenosha County.

mi	km	Destinations	Notes
0.0	0.0	I-41 / I-94 / US 41 – Milwaukee, Chicago CTH-Q west (104th Street)	Western terminus; I-41/I-94/US 41 exit 347; roadway continues as CTH-Q
3.3	5.3	WIS 31 (Green Bay Road)	
4.9	7.9	CTH-ML (Springbrook Road)	
6.7	10.8	WIS 32 / LMCT (Sheridan Road); 104th Street	Eastern terminus; roadway continues as 104th Street
1.000 mi = 1.609 km; 1.000 km = 0.621 mi
