= Valmy, Wisconsin =

- Unincorporated community
- Location within the state of Wisconsin
- Coordinates: 44°54′29″N 87°15′47″W
- Country: United States
- State: Wisconsin
- County: Door
- Town: Sevastopol
- Elevation: 653 ft (199 m)
- Time zone: UTC-6 (Central (CST))
  - Summer (DST): UTC-5 (CDT)
- Area code: 920
- GNIS feature ID: 1576026

Valmy is a small unincorporated community in the town of Sevastopol, Wisconsin, United States, where WIS 57 splits with County Highway T in Door County. The community serves as a gateway to the nearby Whitefish Dunes State Park as well as Cave Point County Park.

== Gallery ==
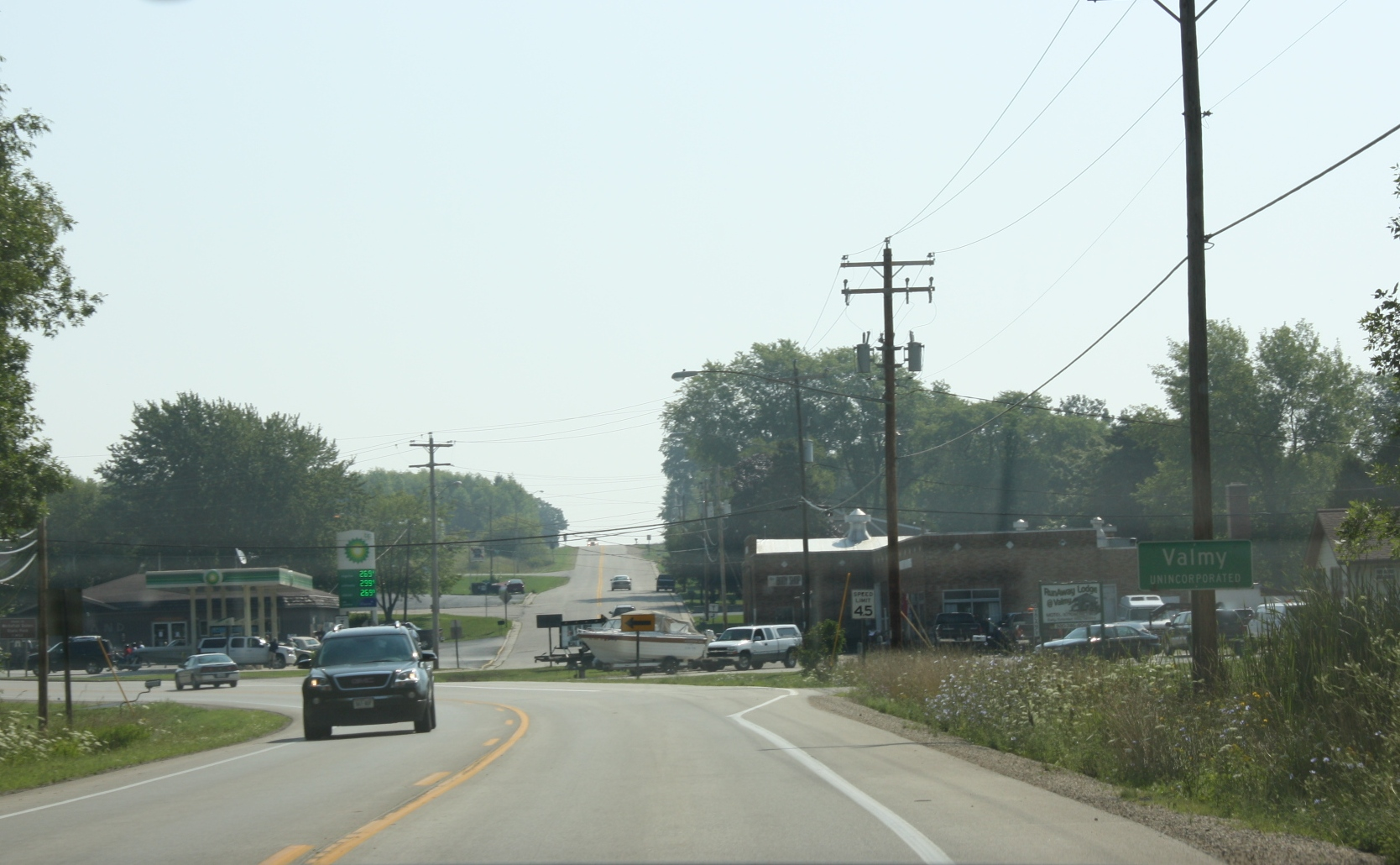
Looking east at the welcome sign on WIS 57

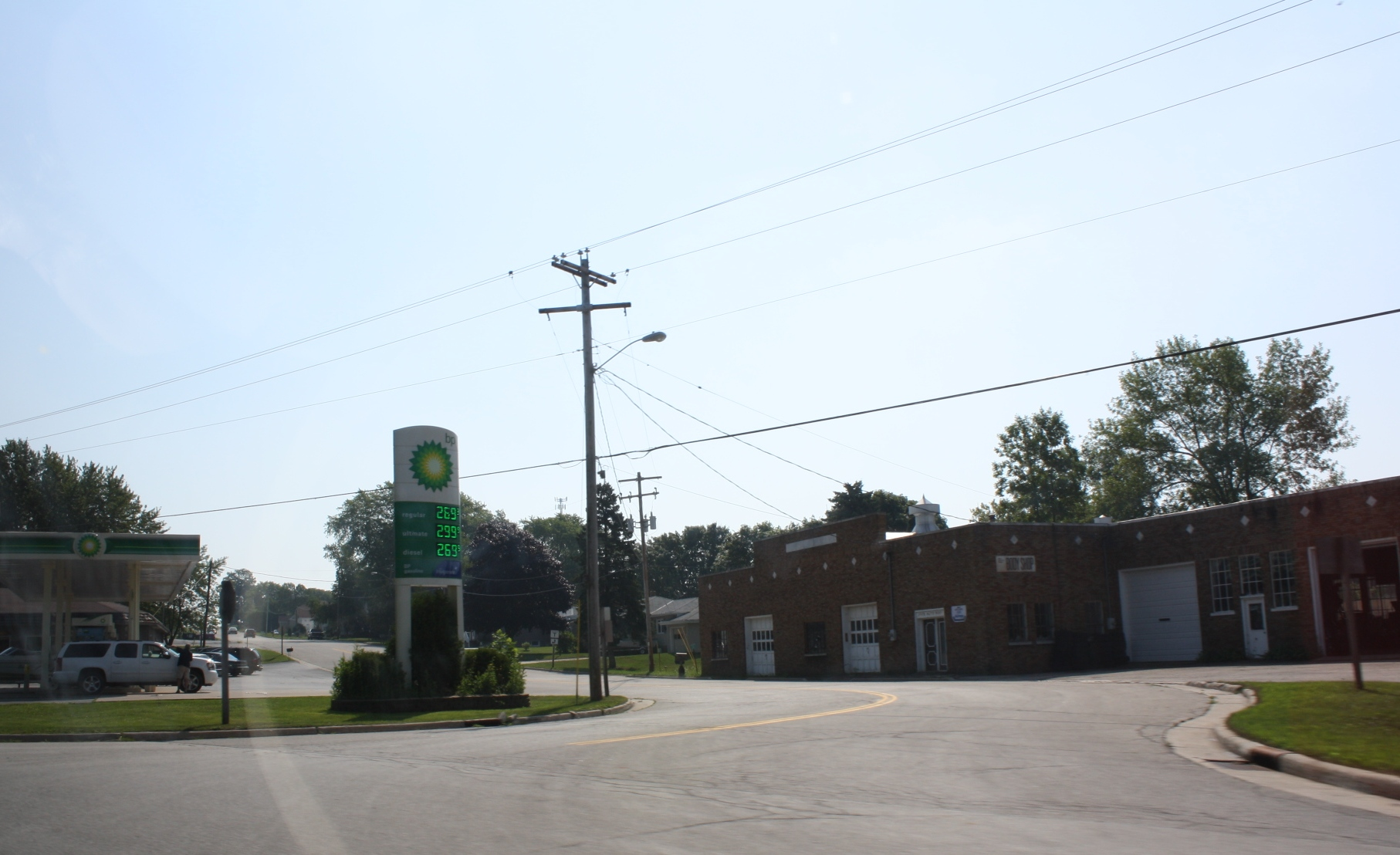
Split of County Trunk Highway T from WIS 57

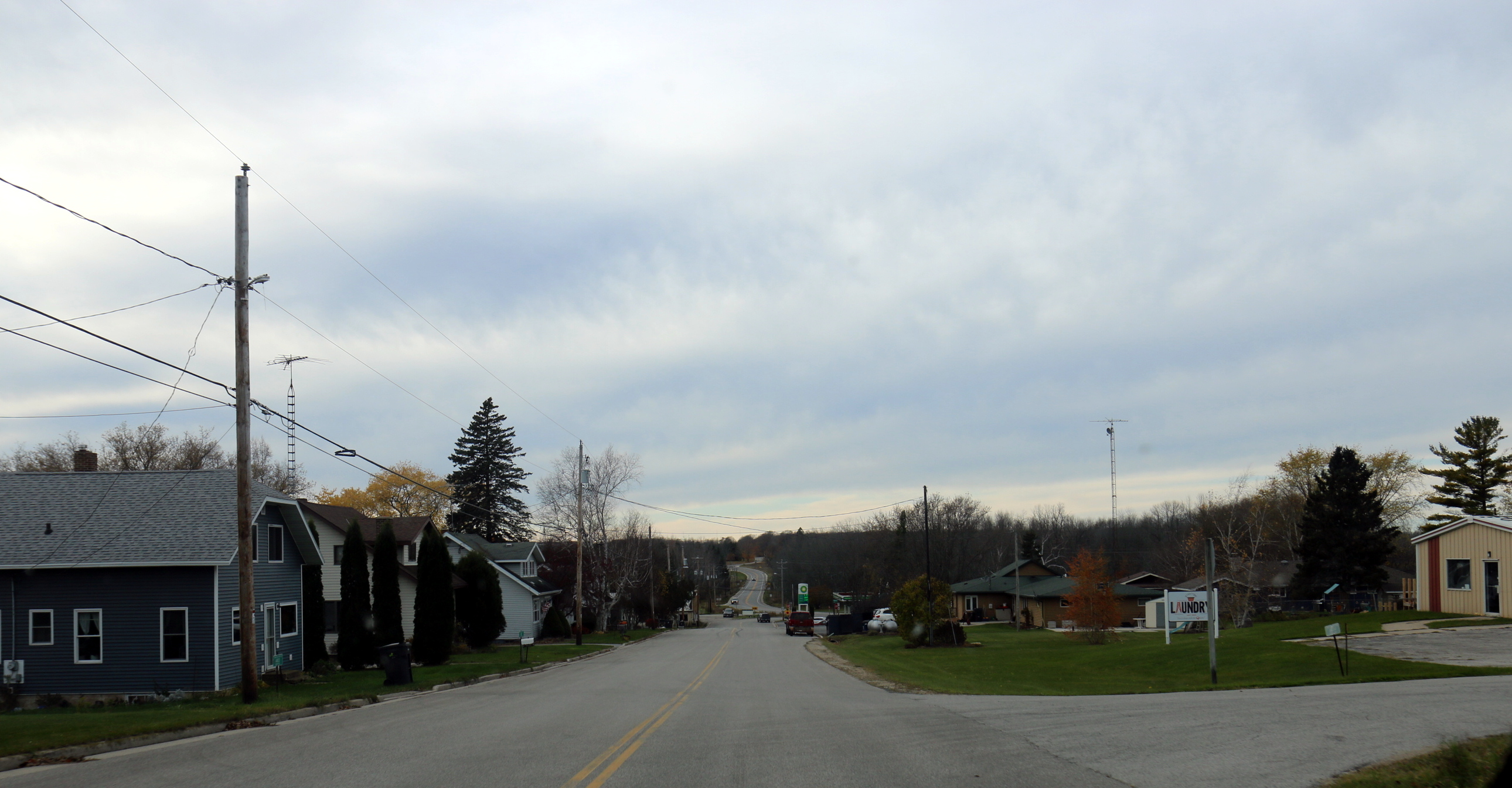
Looking west at Valmy
