= Kiel, Wisconsin =

Kiel
- City
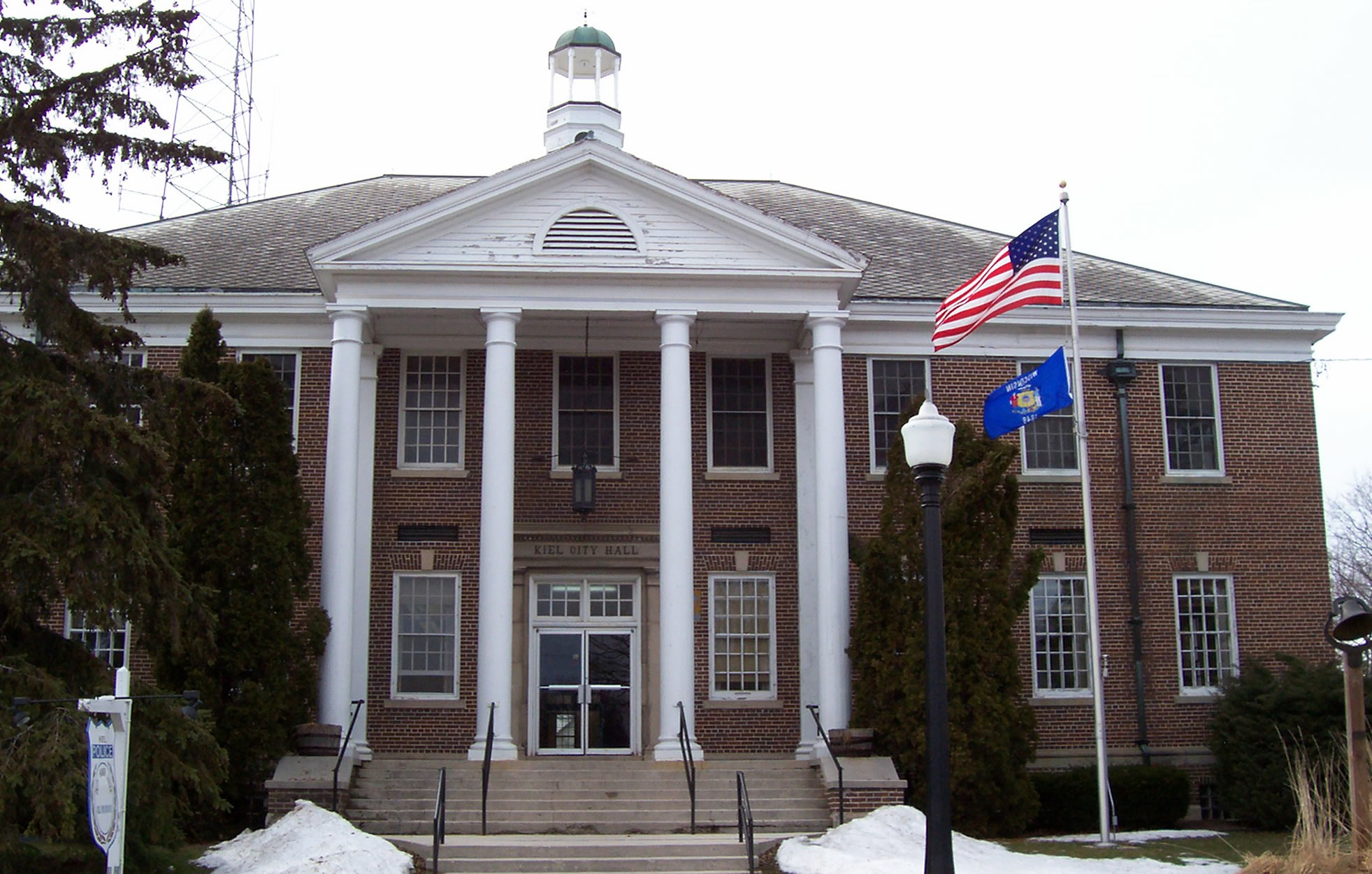
- Kiel City Hall

- Flag

- Location of Kiel in Manitowoc and Calumet counties, Wisconsin

- Location within Wisconsin Location within the United States
- Coordinates: 43°54′53″N 88°1′55″W
- Country: United States
- State: Wisconsin
- Counties: Manitowoc, Calumet

Area
  - Total: 2.65 sq mi (6.86 km^{2})
  - Land: 2.52 sq mi (6.53 km^{2})
  - Water: 0.13 sq mi (0.33 km^{2})
- Elevation: 920 ft (280 m)

Population (2020)
  - Total: 3,932
  - Estimate (2024): 3,985
  - Density: 1,560/sq mi (602/km^{2})
- Time zone: UTC-6 (Central (CST))
  - Summer (DST): UTC-5 (CDT)
- Zip: 53041, 53042, 53043
- Area code: 920
- FIPS code: 55-39525
- GNIS feature ID: 1567461
- Website: kielwi.gov

Kiel is a city in Manitowoc and Calumet counties in the U.S. state of Wisconsin. The population was 3,932 at the 2020 census. Of this, 3,585 residents lived in Manitowoc County, and 347 residents lived in Calumet County. The city is located primarily within Manitowoc County, though a portion extends west into adjacent Calumet County and is known as "Hinzeville".

Kiel was once known as the "Wooden Shoes Capital of Wisconsin," as it held the only wooden shoe factory in Wisconsin.

== History ==
In 1852 Charley Lindemann immigrated to the area and began a settlement among the Native American Menominee and Potawatomi tribes. His wife named the community after her home town of Kiel, Germany. Two years later, Col. Henry F. Belitz, later nicknamed the "Father of Kiel", built a hotel and mill along the north side of the Sheboygan River. A road was built across Wisconsin to connect Green Bay with Milwaukee area communities. The bridge was built across the Sheboygan River in 1858 connecting Kiel with Sheboygan. In the late nineteenth century to the early twentieth century, Kiel became a manufacturing area with businesses specializing in brick, wood shoes, machine, and furniture manufacturing.

A book called Yellowbird written by Kielite Henry Goeres in the late 1800s recounts - in a blend of fact and fiction - the early history of the settlement in the 1850s when European settlers interacted with Native Americans in the area.

Kiel was incorporated as a village in 1892 and later incorporated as a city. The city continues to retain a diverse manufacturing and commercial base.

In 2022, a Title IX investigation was opened into three students at Kiel Middle School for sexual harassment. The students allegedly refused to use a fellow student's preferred gender pronouns. A series of bomb threats against the school district were made in the days following the investigation, forcing the district to evacuate the schools on May 23 and to cancel classes on May 24. On May 26 the school district announced that the remainder of the school year would be conducted virtually. The city government cancelled the city's Memorial Day parade on the same day. As of June 3, the investigations had been closed by the district, and attorneys were looking to clear the students' records.

== Community life ==
Each year, in the 2nd weekend of August, Kiel holds the Kiel Community Picnic or "Kiel Picnic" in City Park. At present, the Kiel Picnic runs for four days from a Thursday through a Sunday. The Kiel Parade is held on Fremont Street on the Sunday of the Kiel Picnic. Traditionally, the firing of a cannon announced the start of the picnic. Each year in February, Kiel holds its Ice Sculpting Contest on Fremont Street. Sponsored teams compete for prizes. Kiel has a significant amount of German heritage, and each June, the city holds "German Days" in City Park.

The Kiel Municipal Band, a community marching band, traces its origins to the late 1800s. The band is known for its signature tune "Invincible Fidelity". The city has several public parks and walking trails. The Solomon Biking Trail is a biking trail that runs between Kiel and the nearby city of New Holstein.

== Geography ==
Kiel is located at 43°54′53″N 88°1′55″W (43.914718, -88.031812), along the Sheboygan River.

According to the United States Census Bureau, the city has a total area of 2.67 square miles (6.92 km^{2}), of which 2.53 square miles (6.55 km^{2}) is land and 0.14 square miles (0.36 km^{2}) is water.

== Demographics ==
Historical population
Census	Pop.	Note	%±
1880	363		—
1890	497		36.9%
1900	924		85.9%
1910	1,244		34.6%
1920	1,599		28.5%
1930	1,803		12.8%
1940	1,898		5.3%
1950	2,129		12.2%
1960	2,524		18.6%
1970	2,848		12.8%
1980	3,083		8.3%
1990	2,910		−5.6%
2000	3,450		18.6%
2010	3,738		8.3%
2020	3,932		5.2%
2024 (est.)	3,985		1.3%
U.S. Decennial Census

=== 2010 census ===
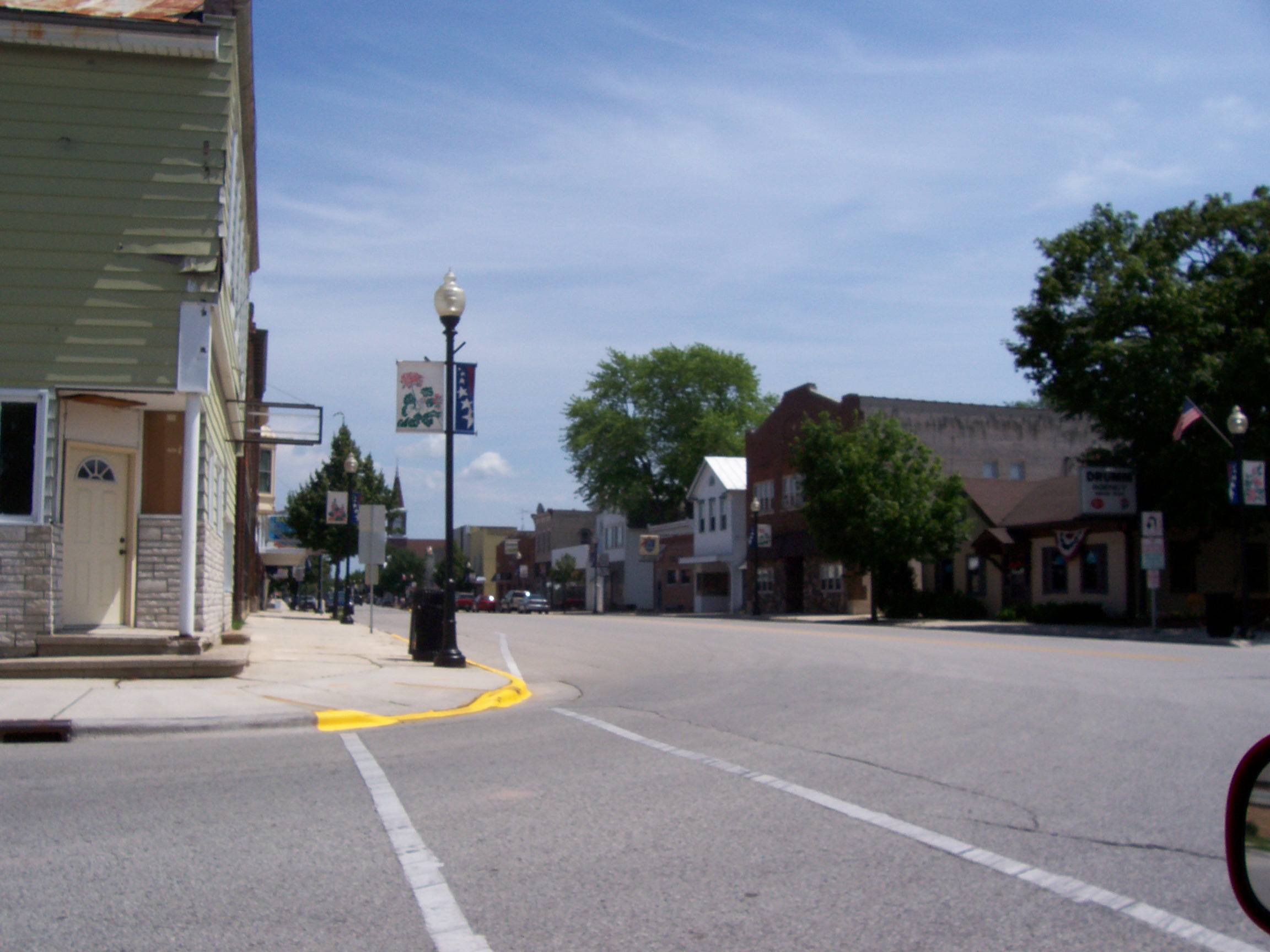
Downtown Kiel

At the 2010 census there were 3,738 people in 1,565 households, including 1,021 families, in the city. The population density was 1,477.5 inhabitants per square mile (570.5/km^{2}). There were 1,697 housing units at an average density of 670.8 per square mile (259.0/km^{2}). The racial makeup of the city was 96.9% White, 0.4% African American, 0.6% Native American, 0.6% Asian, 0.7% from other races, and 0.8% from two or more races. Hispanic or Latino people of any race were 2.0%.

Of the 1,565 households 33.0% had children under the age of 18 living with them, 53.4% were married couples living together, 8.1% had a female householder with no husband present, 3.8% had a male householder with no wife present, and 34.8% were non-families. 29.9% of households were one person and 13.8% were one person aged 65 or older. The average household size was 2.39 and the average family size was 2.98.

The median age was 38.7 years. 26.5% of residents were under the age of 18; 5.3% were between the ages of 18 and 24; 27.6% were from 25 to 44; 25% were from 45 to 64; and 15.7% were 65 or older. The gender makeup of the city was 48.0% male and 52.0% female.

=== 2000 census ===
At the 2000 census there were 3,450 people in 1,425 households, including 940 families, in the city. The population density was 1,433.9 people per square mile (552.7/km^{2}). There were 1,498 housing units at an average density of 622.6 per square mile (240.0/km^{2}). The racial makeup of the city was 98.58% White, 0.06% African American, 0.23% Native American, 0.46% Asian, 0.23% from other races, and 0.43% from two or more races. Hispanic or Latino people of any race were 0.72%.

Of the 1,425 households 32.2% had children under the age of 18 living with them, 56.1% were married couples living together, 7.1% had a female householder with no husband present, and 34.0% were non-families. 30.0% of households were one person and 14.2% were one person aged 65 or older. The average household size was 2.42 and the average family size was 3.04.

The age distribution was 26.4% under the age of 18, 7.8% from 18 to 24, 30.3% from 25 to 44, 19.7% from 45 to 64, and 15.8% 65 or older. The median age was 36 years. For every 100 females, there were 91.8 males. For every 100 females age 18 and over, there were 90.1 males.

The median household income was $44,239 and the median family income was $53,798. Males had a median income of $36,576 versus $27,070 for females. The per capita income for the city was $23,112. About 1.7% of families and 2.7% of the population were below the poverty line, including 1.6% of those under age 18 and 2.7% of those age 65 or over.

== Transportation ==
Wisconsin Highway 67 runs north–south at the extreme east edge of Kiel. Highways 32 and 57 run through downtown Kiel, entering the city from the north at the northwest corner of the city and enter from the east at the southeast corner of the city. Wisconsin Highway 149 (now CTH XX east of Kiel) originally had its western terminus in Kiel. It later was extended west to Fond du Lac. Many years later the original route from Cleveland to Kiel was decommissioned and the eastern terminus of the highway was located in Kiel. The entire route was decommissioned in the 2000s.The Sheboygan River enters the city from the Kiel Marsh at the southwest edge of the city under a railroad trestle, meanders through downtown under a wooden footbridge and vehicular bridge, and exits the city in the east side of the city. The river is rarely used as a means of transportation, though it is used for recreational purposes, including canoeing and fishing in warm weather and, in the winter, ice skating and snowmobiling. There is a dam in downtown Kiel, another downstream in Rockville, and a third several miles downstream in Millhome.

Kiel is served by the Wisconsin and Southern Railroad. Historically this line was built in 1872 by the Milwaukee Road.

== Media ==
- Tri-County News

== Notable people ==
- Henry F. Belitz, founder, Union officer in the American Civil War, and presidential elector of Abraham Lincoln in 1864
- Trevor Casper, former Wisconsin State Trooper killed in the line of duty
- Amy Krueger, soldier and victim of the 2009 Fort Hood shooting
- Karl Schleunes, historian and educator

== Images ==
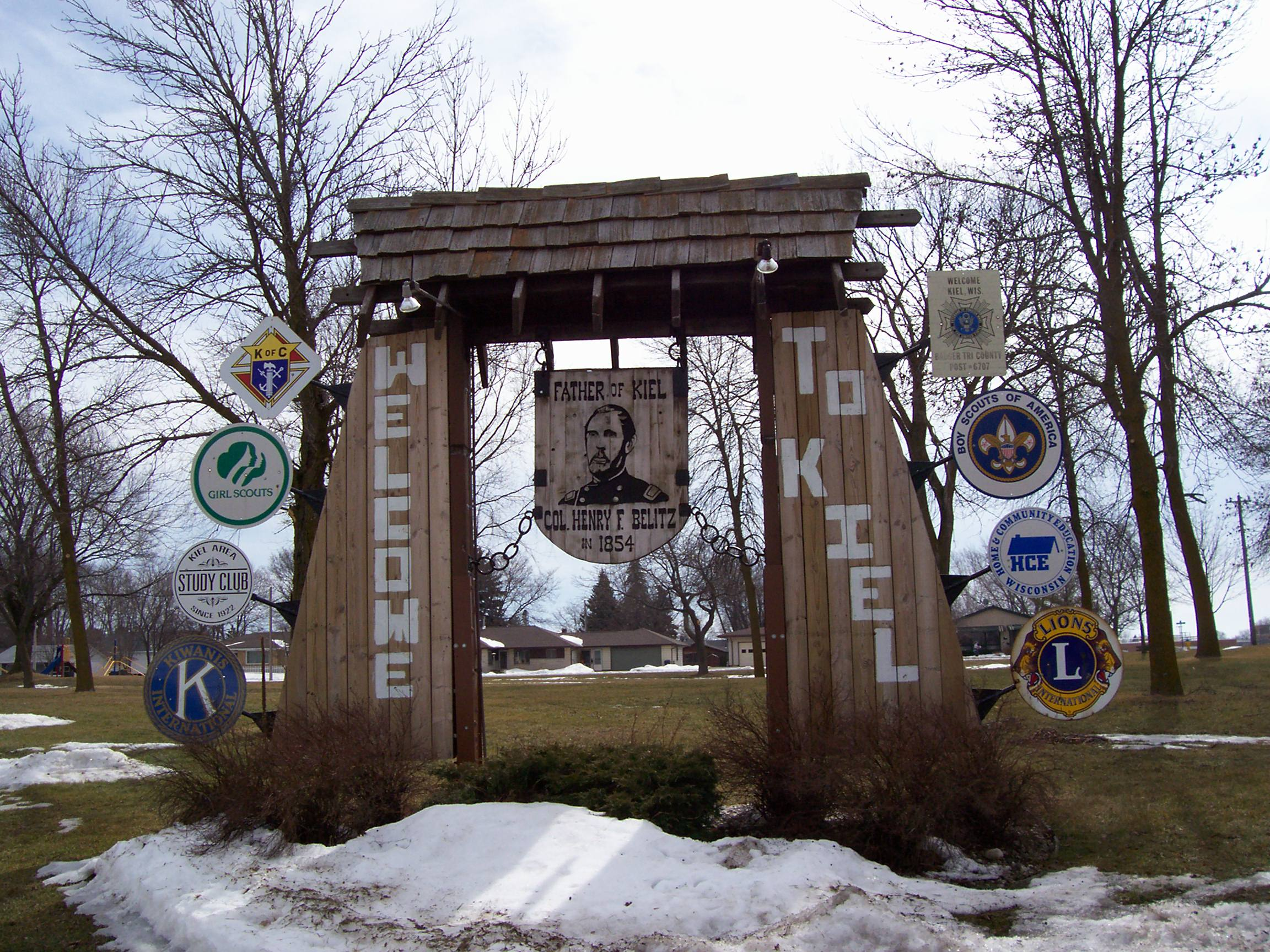
Welcome sign

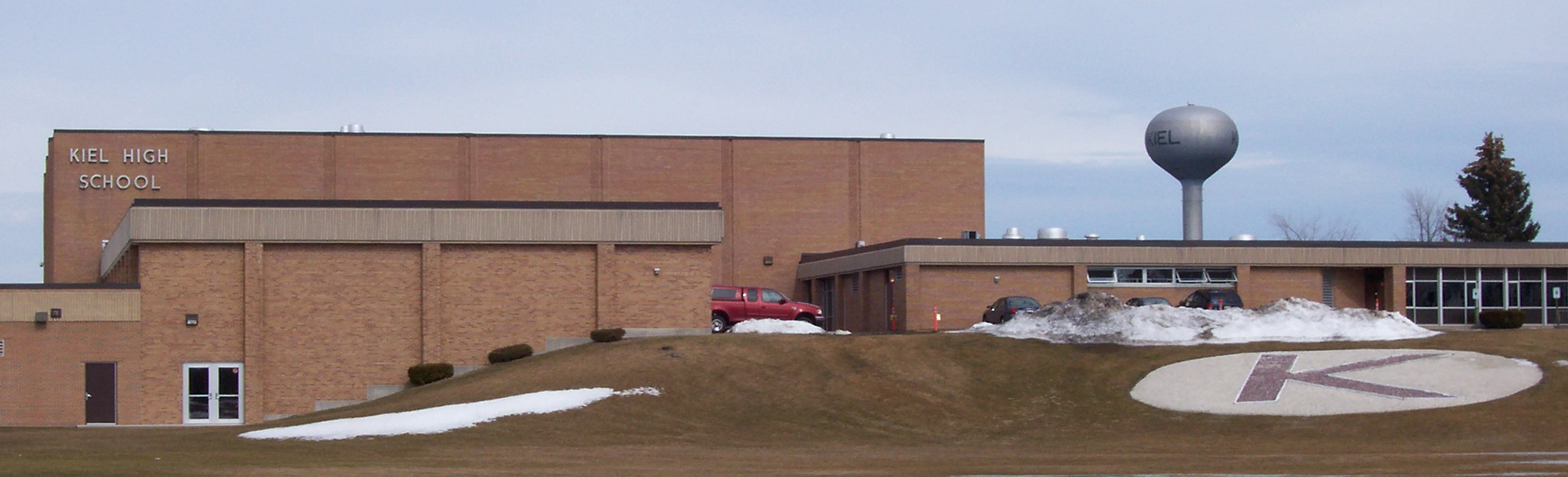
Kiel High School

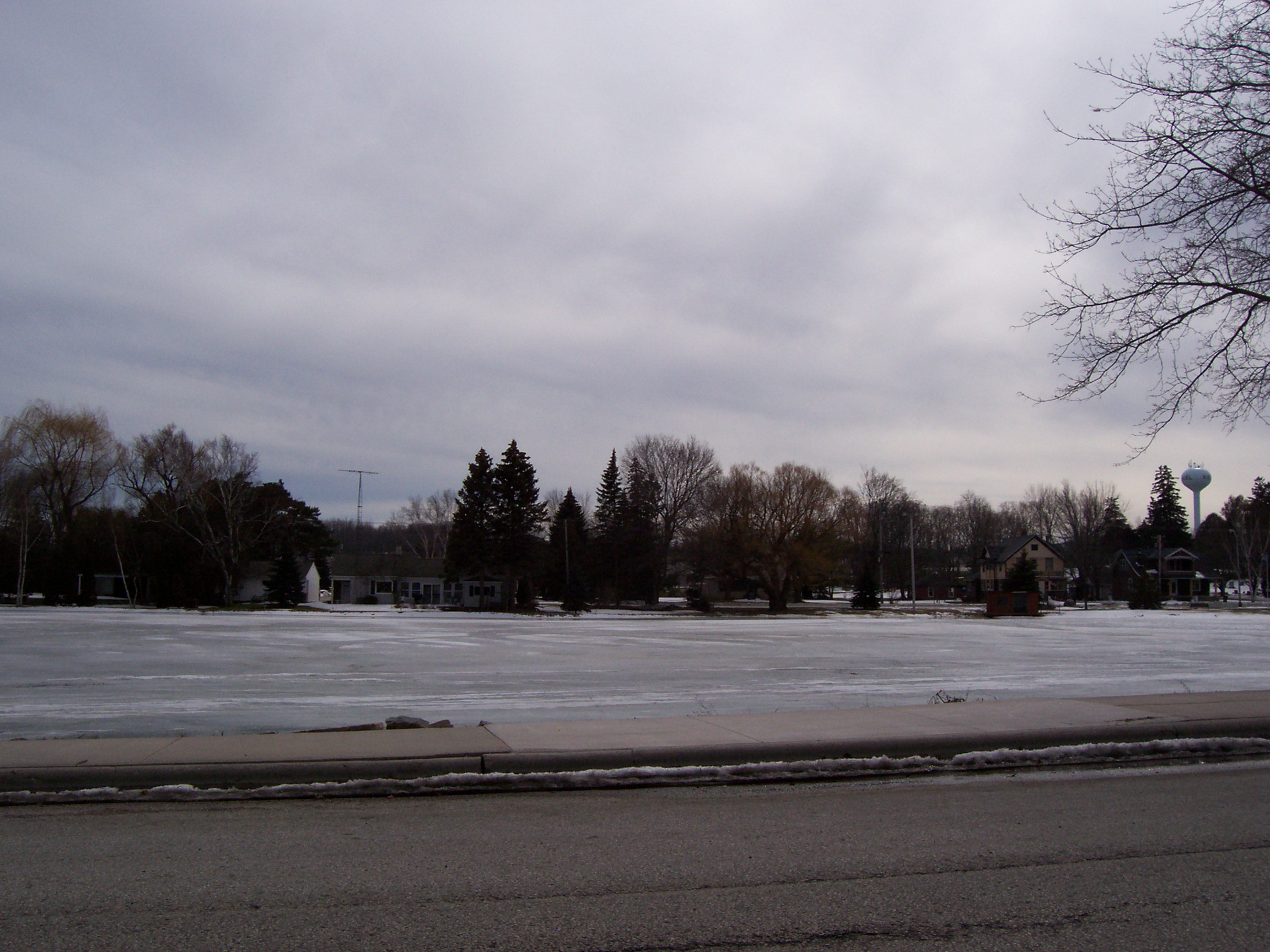
The Sheboygan River in winter

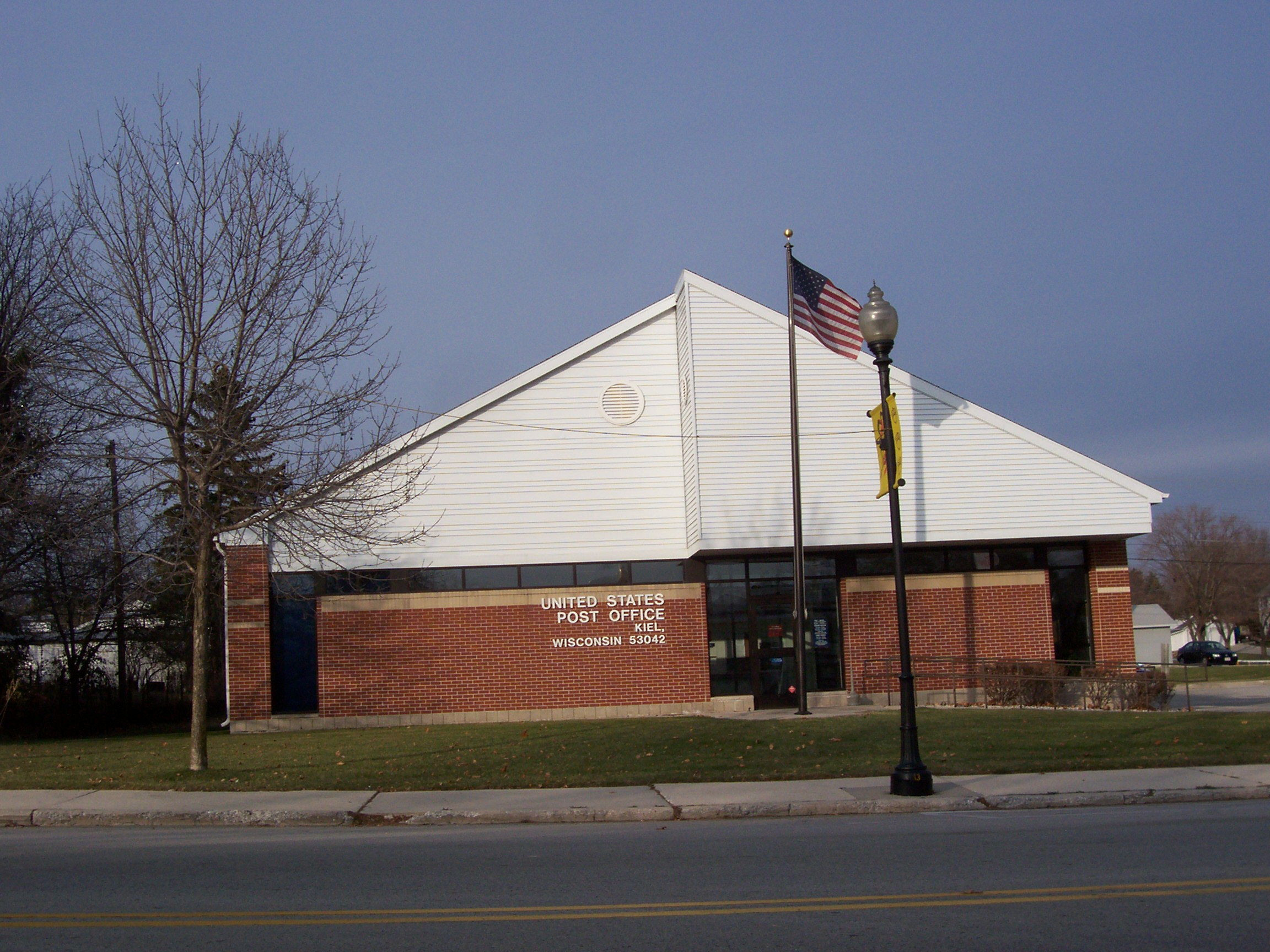
Post office

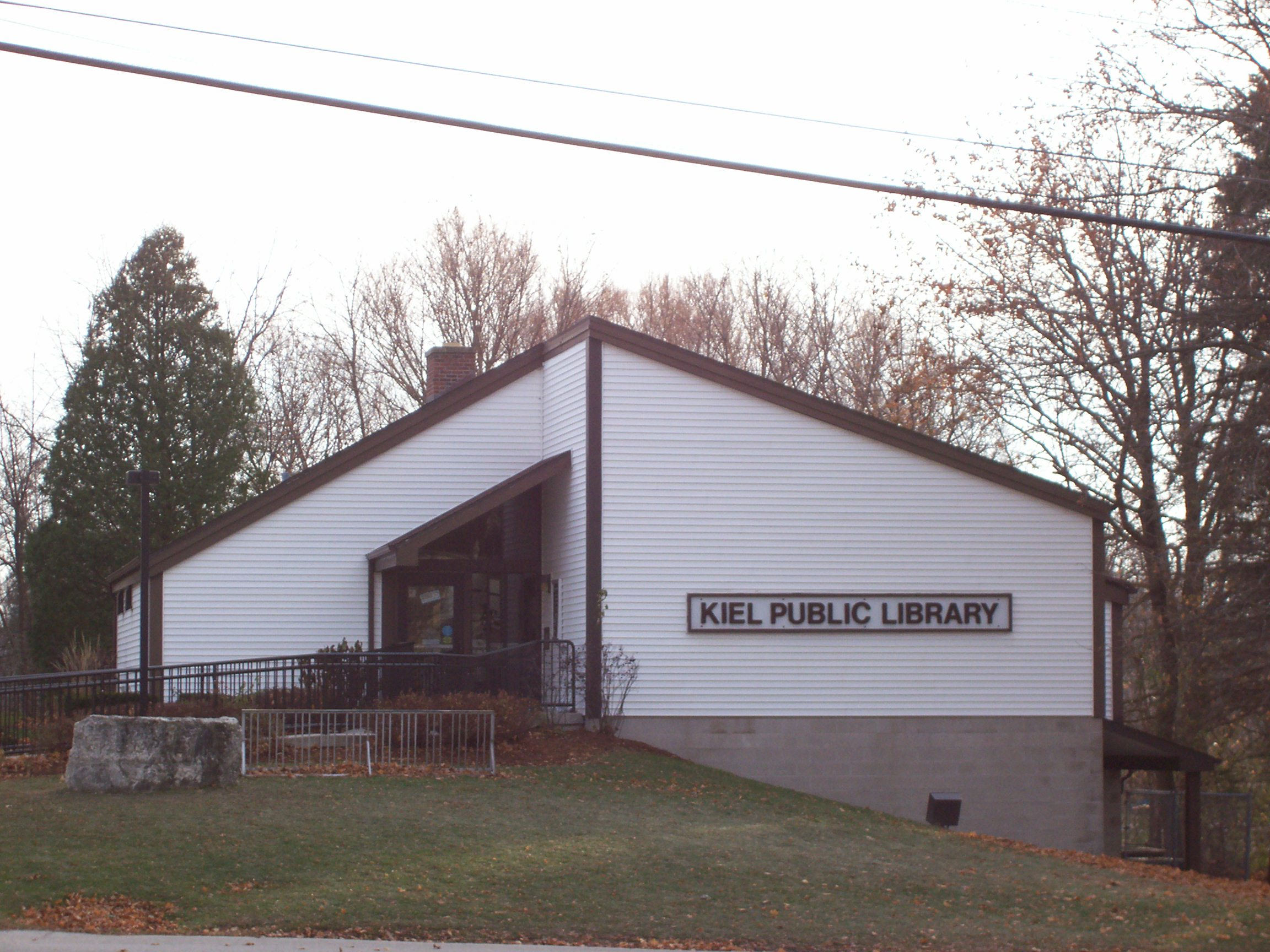
Kiel Public Library
