= Dyckesville, Wisconsin =

Census-designated place in Wisconsin, United States

- Census-designated place
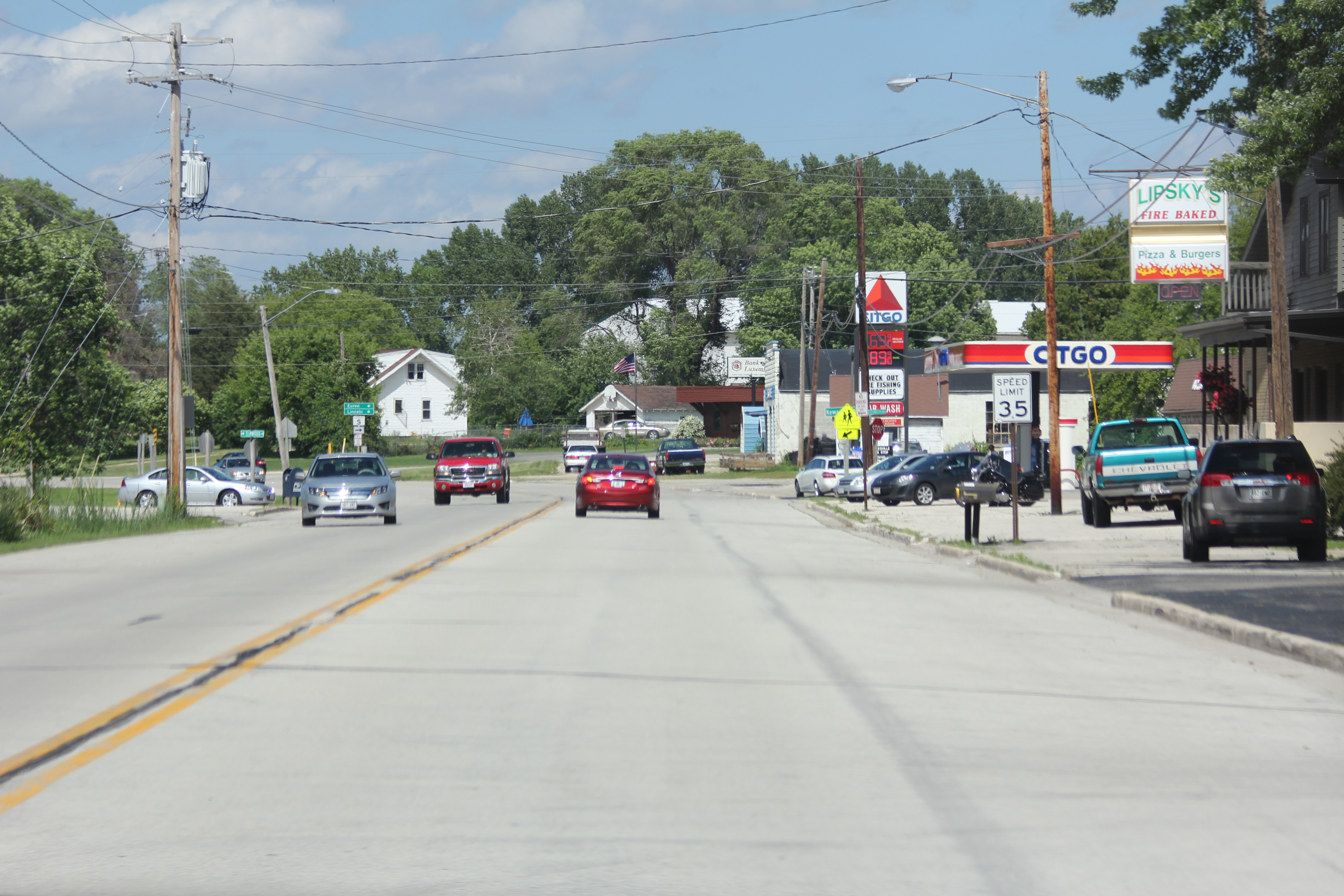
- Looking east in Dyckesville

- Location in Brown County and the state of Wisconsin
- Coordinates: 44°38′36″N 87°45′40″W
- Country: United States
- State: Wisconsin
- Counties: Brown, Kewaunee
- Towns: Green Bay, Red River

Area
  - Total: 1.041 sq mi (2.70 km^{2})
  - Land: 1.041 sq mi (2.70 km^{2})
  - Water: 0 sq mi (0 km^{2})
- Elevation: 600 ft (180 m)

Population (2020)
  - Total: 490
  - Density: 470/sq mi (180/km^{2})
- Time zone: UTC-6 (Central (CST))
  - Summer (DST): UTC-5 (CDT)
- ZIP code: 54217
- Area code: 920
- GNIS feature ID: 1564226

Dyckesville is an unincorporated census-designated place in Brown and Kewaunee counties in the U.S. state of Wisconsin, located in the towns of Green Bay and Red River. As of the 2020 census, its population was 490, a decline from the figure of 538 tabulated in 2010. Dyckesville is bypassed by Wisconsin Highway 57, which passed through the community until 2006. Dyckesville is part of the Green Bay Metropolitan Statistical Area.

== History ==
Dyckesville was founded circa 1860 by Louis Van Dycke, and was named for him. He established a general store at a point in Red River township, he was also postmaster there, and first district attorney, and township treasurer ten years.

== Climate ==
Dyckesville

Climate chart (precipitation, max. and min. temperature)
| J | F | M | A | M | J | J | A | S | O | N | D |
| 55 −8 −14 | 56 −7 −16 | 62 1 −8 | 115 14 1 | 94 20 5 | 108 23 13 | 113 27 16 | 97 25 13 | 93 22 11 | 119 13 5 | 79 3 −2 | 56 −5 −10 |
- █ Average max. and min. temperatures in °C
- █ Precipitation totals in mm
Imperial conversion
| J | F | M | A | M | J | J | A | S | O | N | D |
| 2.2 18 7 | 2.2 19 3 | 2.4 34 18 | 4.5 57 34 | 3.7 68 41 | 4.3 73 55 | 4.4 81 61 | 3.8 77 55 | 3.7 72 52 | 4.7 55 41 | 3.1 37 28 | 2.2 23 14 |
- █ Average max. and min. temperatures in °F
- █ Precipitation totals in inches

== In popular culture ==
A fictionalized version of Dyckesville appears in the 2018 video game The Crew 2.
