= Wisconsin Highway 32 =

State highway in Wisconsin, United States

State Trunk Highway 32
- 32nd Division Memorial Highway
- WIS 32 highlighted in red

Route information
- Maintained by WisDOT
- Length: 325.69 mi (524.15 km)
- Tourist routes: Lake Michigan Circle Tour

Major junctions
- South end: IL 137 in Pleasant Prairie
- I-794 in Milwaukee; I-43 / WIS 100 in Bayside; I-43 / WIS 57 in Grafton; I-43 in Port Washington; I-43 in Cedar Grove; US 151 in Chilton; US 10 in Forest Junction; I-41 / US 41 / WIS 54 in Green Bay; US 8 in Laona; US 45 in Three Lakes
- North end: US 45 in Land O' Lakes

Location
- Country: United States
- State: Wisconsin
- Counties: Kenosha, Racine, Milwaukee, Ozaukee, Sheboygan, Manitowoc, Calumet, Brown, Shawano, Oconto, Forest, Oneida, Vilas

Highway system
- Wisconsin State Trunk Highway System; Interstate; US; State; Scenic; Rustic
← WIS 31	→ WIS 33

State Trunk Highway 32 (often called Highway 32, STH-32 or WIS 32) is a state highway in the U.S. state of Wisconsin that runs north–south in the eastern part of the state. It runs from the Illinois border (at Illinois Route 137) north to the Michigan border (concurrent with U.S. Highway 45). It is named the 32nd Division Memorial Highway after the U.S. 32nd Infantry Division, and the highway shields have red arrows—the division's logo—on either side of the number 32. The route of WIS 32 and the Red Arrow marking is set in state statute by the Wisconsin Legislature.

== Route description ==
=== Illinois state line to Milwaukee ===
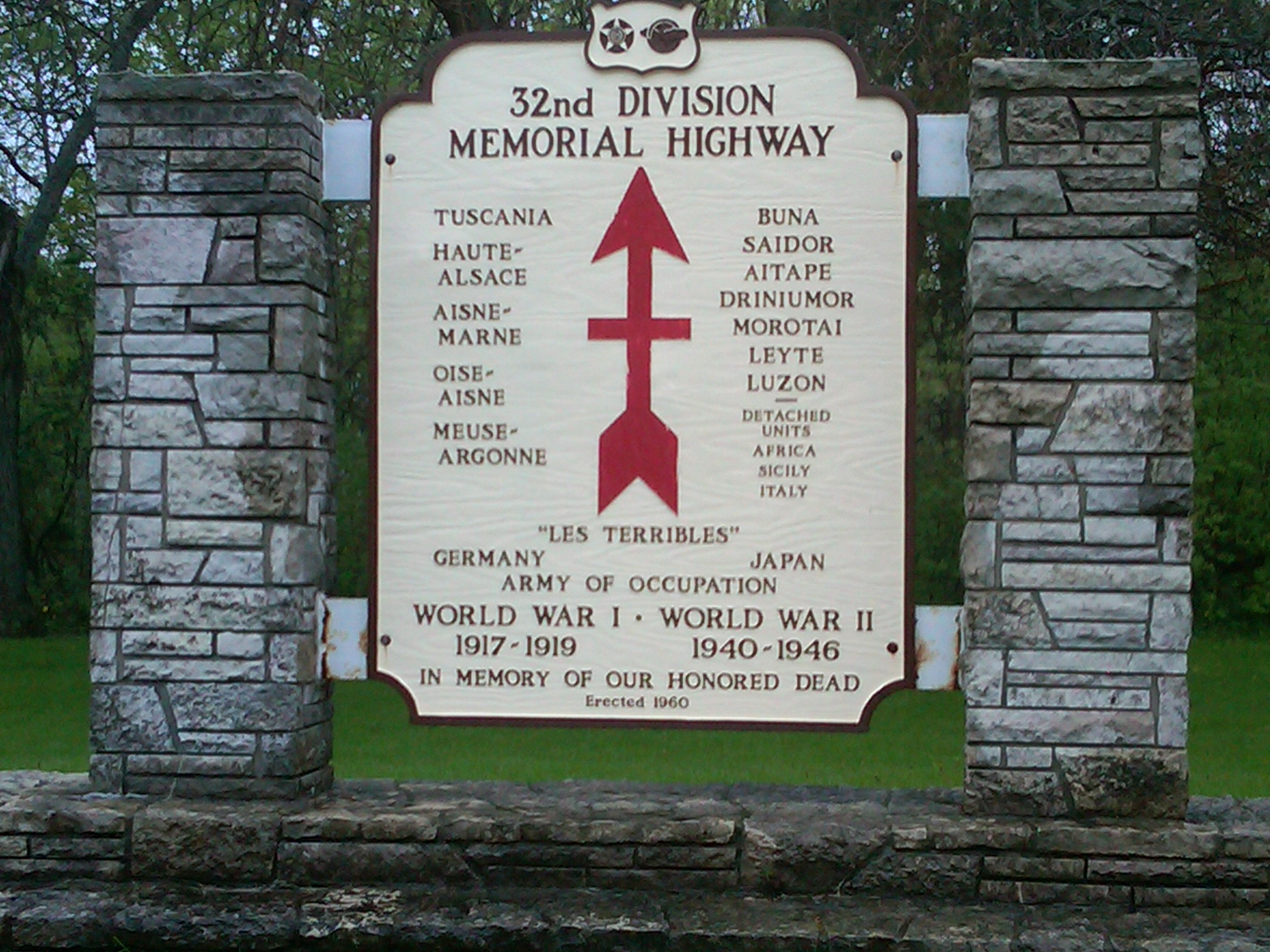
32nd Division Infantry sign in Racine County

At the Illinois state line, IL 137 ends while WIS 32 begins as a continuation of it. From then on, it intersects WIS 165, WIS 50 and WIS 158 in Kenosha, and WIS 11 in Racine. Then, as WIS 32 nearly reaches Racine, Sheridan Road ends and continues as Racine Street. Then, in downtown Racine, WIS 20 runs concurrently with WIS 32 for 10 blocks. Also, east of the roundabout, the concurrency splits into a one-way pair (6th Street westbound; 7th Street eastbound). At Main Street, WIS 32 turns north while WIS 20 ends there. South of the bascule bridge, WIS 32 intersects WIS 38. After the crossing, it bends west at Hamilton Street and then north at Douglas Avenue. Further north, it intersects WIS 31 in the middle of Oak Creek and Racine and WIS 100 in Oak Creek. In South Milwaukee, it bends east from Chicago Avenue via Marquette Avenue, crossing under a 12 feet (3.7 m) railroad overpass, and then back north via 10th Avenue. At the South Milwaukee-Cudahy town line, WIS 32 turns east via College Avenue and then back north again via Lake Drive. In St. Francis, it turns west via Howard Avenue and then back north again via Kinnickinnic Avenue.

=== Milwaukee ===
In the Bay View neighborhood, it crosses under Lake Parkway (WIS 794) without a direct interchange and a railroad overpasses. At another bascule bridge near another neighborhood called Harbor View, it crosses over the Kinnickinnic River and then crosses under another railroad overpass. In this neighborhood, it transitions into 1st Street. Then, it intersects WIS 59 and then bends east via Pittsburgh Avenue just north of the two overpasses. After another bascule bridge, it enters the Historic Third Ward where it briefly transitions into Young Street. It then travels north via Milwaukee Street, following part of the streetcar route. At this point, WIS 32 splits again, this time as a two-way pair.

For northbound traffic, it continues north until it reaches Wells Street where it turns east. Between Michigan and Wells Streets, westbound US 18 concurrently follows northbound WIS 32. It then travels north via Prospect Avenue. It then reaches State Street where the split ends.

For southbound traffic, it diverges west via State Street. Then, it travels south via Broadway and then east via St Paul Avenue. This time, US 18 concurrently follows two sections of southbound WIS 32. There is one on State Street between Milwaukee Street and Broadway (for westbound US 18) and another between Wells and Michigan Streets (eastbound US 18). Both directions cross under Interstate 794 east of the Marquette Interchange.

After that, another split happens. This time, it is another one-way pair. Northbound traffic continues to follow Prospect Avenue. On the other hand, southbound traffic continues to follow Bradford Avenue, then Farwell Avenue, and then Franklin Place. WIS 32 then turns north onto Lake Drive.

=== Milwaukee to Green Bay ===
In Shorewood, WIS 32 intersects WIS 190. In Bayside, WIS 32 bends west, leaving Lake Drive northward. As a result, WIS 32 transitions into Brown Deer Road. At the cloverleaf interchange, WIS 100 ends where WIS 32 merges onto I-43. They come across WIS 57/WIS 167 at a diamond interchange (only WIS 57 travels concurrently with the other two routes), and WIS 60 at another diamond interchange. At another diamond interchange (exit 93), WIS 32 diverged in favor of serving Port Washington. In Port Washington, it intersects WIS 33, turns east onto Grand Avenue, then turns north onto Franklin Street, and then shifts west onto Wisconsin Street. In Knellsville, WIS 32 travels back and merge onto I-43 (WIS 57 already left I-43 north of Saukville). It eventually leaves I-43 east of Cedar Grove. Further north, it intersects WIS 28 at a roundabout, goes through Sheboygan Falls, intersects WIS 23 at a diamond interchange, and WIS 42 (which turns northwest). In Millhome, WIS 57 then follows another concurrency with WIS 32. They then intersect WIS 67 in Kiel, US 151 in Chilton (which briefly runs concurrently with them), WIS 114 in Hilbert, US 10 at a roundabout in Forest Junction, and WIS 96 at another roundabout in Greenleaf. In De Pere, WIS 32 branches off west from WIS 57. It then turns north from Main Avenue to Eighth Street. It intersects another roundabout that leads to I-41 southbound. It also intersects two separate roads that lead to WIS 172 freeway. It then merges onto westbound Mason Street (WIS 54) from a diamond interchange.

=== Green Bay to Michigan state line ===
WIS 32 then leaves WIS 54 at the dumbbell interchange and then briefly enters I-41. It then branches off west from I-41 at the directional T interchange. WIS 29 then merges onto a limited–access road where WIS 32 runs; concurring with WIS 32. WIS 32 then branches off north from the WIS 29 expressway (which intersects WIS 156). Further north, WIS 32 intersects with WIS 160 in Pulaski, then runs concurrently with WIS 22 at Gillett and then with WIS 64, and then intersects WIS 52 at Wabeno. Also, it then runs concurrently with US 8 and WIS 55 from Laona to Crandon and Crandon to Argonne respectively. Going further northwest, it eventually runs concurrently with US 45 for the rest of the route. As they reach Eagle River, they run concurrently with WIS 70; turning west and then north again. Not only that, they run concurrently with WIS 17 as well after WIS 70 branches off west. They continue north until they reach the state line where WIS 32 ends.

== History ==
Former shield with no red arrows

Initially, WIS 32 ran from WIS 14 (now WIS 55/US 8) in Crandon to WIS 10 (now US 51) near Arbor Vitae via parts of present-day WIS 32 and WIS 70. In 1919, WIS 32 moved away from WIS 10 near Arbor Vitae to M-26 at the Michigan state line in State Line (now Land O' Lakes). That same year, WIS 32 extended from Crandon to Green Bay via most of present-day WIS 32. In 1923, WIS 26 replaced the northernmost part of WIS 32 from Eagle River to Michigan state line. That same year, WIS 32 extended south and then southeast to Sheboygan. The southern extension roughly followed parts of present-day WIS 57, CTH-PP, CTH-W, US 151, WIS 67, WIS 32, and WIS 42.

In 1935, US 45 extended north from Des Plaines, Illinois, to Ontonagon, Michigan. In Wisconsin, it followed most of WIS 26.

In 1951, WIS 32 went through significant changes. It was designated as the 32nd Division Memorial Highway; as such, the WIS 32 markers began to bear two red arrows pointing up, the only state trunk highway to have them in Wisconsin. WIS 32 was extended from both ends, becoming a state-to-state highway. The route was re-extended north to the Michigan border via US 45. From the southern end of WIS 32, the route absorbed a segment of WIS 42 south of Howards Grove, giving WIS 32 the routing WIS 42 formerly served in Port Washington, Milwaukee, Racine, Kenosha, and Illinois instead of Sheboygan. In the 1980s, WIS 32 from Kiel to De Pere was pushed westward to run concurrently with more sections of WIS 57. This was done in favor of transferring part of it from state maintenance to local control (now signed as CTH-W/CTH-PP).

== Major intersections ==
County	Location	mi	km	Exit	Destinations	Notes
Kenosha	Pleasant Prairie	0.0	0.0		IL 137 south / LMCT (Sheridan Road) CR A1 west (Russell Road)	Southern terminus of WIS 32; continues into Illinois as IL 137/LMCT
Kenosha	Pleasant Prairie	2.0	3.2		WIS 165 west	Eastern terminus of WIS 165
Kenosha	Kenosha	5.9	9.5		WIS 50 west (63rd Street) to I-94	Eastern terminus of WIS 50
Kenosha	Kenosha	6.6	10.6		WIS 158 (52nd Street) to I-94	
Racine–Kenosha county line		12.4	20.0		WIS 195 west	Eastern terminus of WIS 195
Racine	Racine	14.5	23.3		WIS 11 west	Eastern terminus of WIS 11
Racine	Racine	16.1	25.9		WIS 20 west (Washington Avenue)	Southern end of WIS 20 concurrency
Racine	Racine	16.9– 17.0	27.2– 27.4		WIS 20 west (7th Street/6th Street)	Northern end of WIS 20 concurrency; eastern terminus of WIS 20
Racine	Racine	17.3	27.8		WIS 38 north (State Street)	Southern terminus of WIS 38
Racine	Caledonia	24.0	38.6		WIS 31 south	Northern terminus of WIS 31
Milwaukee	Oak Creek	28.0	45.1		WIS 100 west to I-94	Eastern (southern) terminus of WIS 100
Milwaukee	Milwaukee	41.2	66.3		WIS 59 west	Eastern terminus of WIS 59
Milwaukee	Milwaukee	42.2– 42.3	67.9– 68.1		I-794 (East–West Freeway/Lake Freeway)	No direct access to westbound I-794 and from I-794 eastbound
Milwaukee	Milwaukee	42.3– 42.4	68.1– 68.2		US 18 east (Michigan Street)	Southern end of US 18 concurrency
Milwaukee	Milwaukee	42.6– 42.9	68.6– 69.0		US 18 west	Northern end of US 18 concurrency; runs concurrently with southbound WIS 32 on State Street (between Milwaukee Street and Broadway) and Broadway (between Wells and Michigan Streets); runs concurrently with northbound WIS 32 on Milwaukee Street (between Michigan and Wells Streets)
Milwaukee	Shorewood	46.8	75.3		WIS 190 west (Capitol Drive)	Eastern terminus of WIS 190
Milwaukee	Bayside–River Hills line	54.7	88.0	82	I-43 south (North–South Freeway) / WIS 100 west (Brown Deer Road)	Eastern (northern) terminus of WIS 100; southern end of I-43 concurrency; being rebuilt into a diverging diamond interchange
Milwaukee–Ozaukee county line	Bayside–River Hills– Mequon tripoint	54.8– 55.1	88.2– 88.7	83	CTH-W (Port Washington Road), County Line Road	Rebuilt into a full interchange in 2023
Ozaukee	Mequon	57.8	93.0	85	WIS 57 south / WIS 167 west (Mequon Road)	Southern end of WIS 57 concurrency; eastern terminus of WIS 167
Ozaukee	Mequon	59.9	96.4	87	Highland Road	
Ozaukee	Mequon	61.9	99.6	89	CTH-C – Cedarburg	
Ozaukee	Grafton	64.7	104.1	92	WIS 60 west / CTH-Q east – Grafton	Eastern terminus of WIS 60
Ozaukee	Grafton	66.2	106.5	93	I-43 north / WIS 57 north / CTH-V south – Green Bay, Plymouth, Grafton	Northern end of I-43/WIS 57 concurrency
Ozaukee	Port Washington	69.9	112.5		WIS 33 west (Grand Avenue)	Eastern terminus of WIS 33
Ozaukee	Port Washington–Knellsville line	72.4	116.5	100	I-43 south / CTH-H west – Milwaukee, Fredonia	Southern end of I-43 concurrency
Ozaukee	Belgium	79.1	127.3	107	CTH-D – Belgium	
Sheboygan	Cedar Grove	84.4	135.8	113	I-43 north / LMCT – Green Bay	Northern end of I-43/LMCT concurrency
Sheboygan	Sheboygan Falls	95.9	154.3		WIS 28 to I-43	
Sheboygan	Sheboygan Falls	98.5	158.5		WIS 23 – Sheboygan, Fond du Lac	Interchange
Sheboygan	Howards Grove	104.7	168.5		WIS 42 – Sheboygan, Manitowoc	
Manitowoc	Millhome	112.7	181.4		WIS 57 south – Milwaukee	Southern end of WIS 57 concurrency; no access from northbound WIS 32 to southbound WIS 57
Manitowoc	Kiel	116.3	187.2		WIS 67	
Calumet	Chilton	127.5	205.2		US 151 north – Manitowoc	Southern end of US 151 concurrency
Calumet	Chilton	128.3	206.5		US 151 south – Fond du Lac, Madison	Northern end of US 151 concurrency
Calumet	Hilbert	136.0	218.9		WIS 114 west – Sherwood, Menasha, Neenah	Eastern terminus of WIS 114
Calumet	Forest Junction	141.1	227.1		US 10 – Manitowoc, Appleton	
Brown	Greenleaf	148.9	239.6		WIS 96 – Wrightstown, Denmark	
Brown	De Pere	158.0	254.3		CTH-PP – Reedsville	Northbound entrance; southbound exit
Brown	De Pere	158.7	255.4		WIS 57 north / CTH-G / CTH-X north – Reedsville	Northern end of WIS 57 concurrency
Brown	De Pere	160.3	258.0		I-41 south / US 41 south / Glory Road	No access to northbound I-41 and from southbound I-41
Brown	Ashwaubenon	162.0	260.7		To WIS 172	
Brown	Green Bay	164.8	265.2		WIS 54 east (Mason Street) to WIS 57	Southern end of WIS 54 concurrency
Brown	Green Bay	167.6	269.7	168A	I-41 south / US 41 south / WIS 54 west (Mason Street) – Appleton	Northern end of WIS 54 concurrency; southern end of I-41/US 41 concurrency
Brown	Howard	168.2	270.7	168B	I-41 north / US 41 north to WIS 29 east (Shawano Avenue) – Marinette	Northern end of I-41/US 41 concurrency
Brown	Howard	169.5	272.8		WIS 29 east / CTH-EB – Green Bay	Southern end of WIS 29 concurrency; southbound exit; northbound entrance
Brown	Howard–Hobart line	171.6	276.2	255	CTH-FF – Howard, Hobart	
Brown	Howard–Hobart line	173.9	279.9	253	CTH-VV – Howard, Hobart	
Brown		176.7	284.4	249	WIS 29 west / WIS 156 west – Wausau, Clintonville	Northern end of WIS 29 concurrency; eastern terminus of WIS 156
Brown	Pulaski	182.5	293.7		WIS 160 west – Angelica	Eastern terminus of WIS 160
Shawano	No major junctions					
Oconto		198.0	318.7		WIS 22 north – Oconto Falls	Southern end of WIS 22 concurrency
Oconto	Gillett	200.8	323.2		WIS 22 south – Shawano	Northern end of WIS 22 concurrency
Oconto		222.2	357.6		WIS 64 east – Marinette	Southern end of WIS 64 concurrency
Oconto		229.3	369.0		WIS 64 west – Antigo	Northern end of WIS 64 concurrency
Forest	Wabeno	250.6	403.3		WIS 52 west – Lily	Eastern terminus of WIS 52
Forest	Laona	258.6	416.2		US 8 east – Armstrong Creek	Southern end of US 8 concurrency
Forest	Crandon	269.9	434.4		WIS 55 south – Mole Lake, Shawano	Southern end of WIS 55 concurrency
Forest	Crandon	270.4	435.2		US 8 west – Rhinelander	Northern end of US 8 concurrency
Forest	Argonne	277.0	445.8		WIS 55 north – Iron River, Michigan	Northern end of WIS 55 concurrency
Oneida	Three Lakes	296.9	477.8		US 45 south – Monico	Southern end of US 45 concurrency
Vilas	Eagle River	306.3	492.9		WIS 70 east – Florence	Southern end of WIS 70 concurrency
Vilas	Eagle River	307.8	495.4		WIS 70 west / WIS 17 south – St. Germain, Rhinelander	Northern end of WIS 70 concurrency; southern end of WIS 17 concurrency
Vilas		311.8	501.8		WIS 17 north – Phelps	Northern end of WIS 17 concurrency
Vilas	Land O' Lakes	325.69	524.15		US 45 north – Watersmeet, Ontonagon	Northern terminus of WIS 32; road continues into Michigan as US 45
1.000 mi = 1.609 km; 1.000 km = 0.621 mi: Concurrency terminus; Incomplete access

== See also ==
- Sheridan Road, the highway's designation through much of Kenosha and Racine
