= Wisconsin Highway 57 =

State highway in Wisconsin, United States

State Trunk Highway 57
- 57th Field Artillery Brigade Memorial Highway
- WIS 57; mainline in red, business route in blue

Route information
- Maintained by WisDOT
- Length: 191.82 mi (308.70 km)
- Existed: 1918–present
- Tourist routes: Lake Michigan Circle Tour

Major junctions
- South end: WIS 59 in Milwaukee
- I-94 in Milwaukee; US 18 in Milwaukee; I-43 / WIS 190 in Milwaukee; I-43 / WIS 32 / WIS 167 in Mequon; I-43 in Saukville; US 151 in Chilton; US 10 in Forest Junction; US 141 / WIS 29 in Green Bay; I-43 in Green Bay; WIS 42 around Sturgeon Bay
- North end: WIS 42 in Sister Bay

Location
- Country: United States
- State: Wisconsin
- Counties: Milwaukee, Ozaukee, Sheboygan, Manitowoc, Calumet, Brown, Kewaunee, Door

Highway system
- Wisconsin State Trunk Highway System; Interstate; US; State; Scenic; Rustic
← WIS 56	→ WIS 58

Wisconsin Highway 57 (often called Highway 57, STH-57 or WIS 57) is a 191.82-mile-long (308.70 km) state highway in Wisconsin, United States. It runs from its southern terminus at WIS 59 in Milwaukee to its northern terminus at WIS 42 in Sister Bay. Much of WIS 57 parallels Interstate 43 (I-43) and WIS 42, particularly from Saukville to its northern terminus in Sister Bay. The highway runs concurrently with I-43 for 12 miles (19 km) in Ozaukee County. Like most Wisconsin state highways, WIS 57 is maintained by the Wisconsin Department of Transportation (WisDOT).

WIS 57 serves as a major highway in eastern Wisconsin, and it was originally designed to connect the major cities of Milwaukee and Green Bay as well as several other large cities along its corridor. The state of Wisconsin proposed that the WIS 57 route become an Interstate Highway corridor when the Interstate Highway System was planned in the 1950s; the state's plan was rejected in favor of the current routing of I-43, though it remains a popular and marked alternate route for both I-43 and I-41 to the west. WIS 57 is also a major route to the tourist area of Door County; it is one of only two state highways to serve the county with WIS 42.

== Route description ==
=== Milwaukee to De Pere ===
WIS 57 begins at WIS 59 (National Avenue) in Milwaukee and continues north as Layton Boulevard until just south of I-94 where the road name becomes 27th Street. Continuing north of I-94 for eight blocks, WIS 57 turns east onto US 18 (Highland Avenue) before turning north eight blocks later while US 18 parts south towards Marquette University. For almost a mile, WIS 57 heads towards WIS 145 only to turn a block north towards WIS 190. Moving eastward again on WIS 190, WIS 57 heads for I-43 before turning northwestwardly onto Green Bay Road. In Brown Deer, WIS 57 meets WIS 100 (formerly as a diamond interchange until reconstruction in 2023), and continues north for Ozaukee County.

In Ozaukee County, WIS 57 turns right onto WIS 167 and approaching I-43 while WIS 167 ends at the interchange. For the next 12 miles, WIS 57 will run concurrent with I-43 before departing the freeway northwest of Port Washington, where the road runs on a nearly straight line for 31.5 miles (50.7 km). This is also one of two concurrencies with WIS 32, the other being along the stretch between Millhome and De Pere. WIS 57 then transitions into an expressway, passing by Fredonia, Random Lake, Adell, and Waldo in Ozaukee and Sheboygan Counties. WIS 57 transitions back into a rural two lane highway north of WIS 23 in Plymouth and continues in its form until where its meet up with WIS 32 just north of the Sheboygan–Manitowoc county line.

Entering Manitowoc County, WIS 32/57 expands back into an expressway all the way until Kiel. WIS 67 intersects with WIS 32/57 and provides access to Kettle Moraine and Manitowoc (via U.S. 151) at WIS 67's northern terminus. Zigzagging through Kiel, WIS 32 and 57 enter Calumet County and passes by New Holstein before entering the county seat, Chilton. While in Chilton, the two routes connect with U.S. 151 which the latter provides access towards Manitowoc and Sturgeon Bay along the scenic Schooner Coast. Before exiting Calumet County, WIS 32/57 would intersect with WIS 114 and U.S. 10 in Hilbert and Forest Junction respectively. U.S. 10 connects WIS 32/57 with Appleton and Manitowoc, while WIS 114 leads drivers towards Lake Winnebago.

WIS 96 is the first state highway to be crossed by WIS 32/57 in Brown County, connecting to Appleton and Wrightstown to the west while hooking to I-43 in Denmark to the east. WIS 32/57 enters De Pere from the south and crosses over an incomplete interchange with County Highway PP and regaining two lanes in each direction.

=== De Pere to Sister Bay ===
Entering the downtown district, WIS 32 leaves WIS 57 for Pulaski and eventually at the Michigan state line in Land O' Lakes with U.S. 45 167 miles north-northwest. WIS 57 then straddles closer towards the Fox River and passes under WIS 172 in Allouez before entering Green Bay as Monroe Avenue. While in Green Bay, WIS 57 is joined by WIS 54 and briefly by WIS 29. Getting closer into the core, WIS 29/54/57 intersect with U.S. 141 while WIS 29 heads east along with U.S. 141 for I-43. After crossing the East River, WIS 54/57 turns eastward for I-43 and becomes a freeway after crossing under the latter while carrying the Lake Michigan Circle Tour. From I-43 to Dyckesville, WIS 57 carries the designation as Sturgeon Bay Road and sometimes referred to as the Sturgeon Bay Freeway. Including the interchange with I-43, WIS 54 departs from WIS 57 at the fourth interchange and heads east for Algoma and Luxemburg. WIS 57 from I-43 to WIS 54 has a speed limit of 70 mph (110 km/h) but then slows down to 65 mph (105 km/h). Continuing north-northeast on Sturgeon Bay Road, WIS 57 intersects several county highways and crosses under CTH-S/DK in Dyckesville before entering Kewaunee County. Like in Manitowoc County, WIS 57 leaves Kewaunee County shortly and enters Door County.

=== Sturgeon Bay and northern Door County ===
While heading towards Sturgeon Bay, WIS 57 intersects with CTH-C. It continues to WIS 42, which connects Sturgeon Bay with Manitowoc. Picking up WIS 42, the two routes then as they enter the city limits of Sturgeon Bay. WIS 42/WIS 57 intersects with CTH-C and CTH-S before crossing over the business routes at an incomplete interchange. The two highway then crosses over the Sturgeon Bay via the Bay View Bridge before intersecting with Michigan Street at a recently constructed roundabout. Bus. WIS 42/Bus. WIS 57 ends at the parent route at another recently constructed roundabout, and the road narrows back down to one primary lane in each direction for the last time. While WIS 42 heads north for Egg Harbor, Fish Creek and Ephraim, WIS 57 turns east for Jacksonport and Baileys Harbor. Before entering Jacksonport, WIS 57 passes through the twin unincorporated communities of Institute and Valmy. WIS 57 then comes close along the Lake Michigan shoreline before entering Baileys Harbor and returning inland for Sister Bay where it ends at WIS 42.

== History ==
When the Wisconsin State Highway system was laid out in 1918, WIS 57 ran from Racine north to Milwaukee along a route that later became U.S. Highway 41 (US 41) and is now WIS 241. By 1921, WIS 57 had been significantly expanded. It was extended northward from Milwaukee to Green Bay along what is generally its present-day route and southward from Racine to the Illinois state line. WIS 57 grew even more in 1923, when the state extended the highway northward from Green Bay to the Michigan state line. However, WIS 57 did not keep this alignment for very long. In 1927, when the U.S. Highway System was established in Wisconsin, WIS 57 was shortened at both ends. The section between Green Bay and Michigan became US 141, and the section south of Milwaukee became part of US 41.

WIS 57 replaced WIS 78 in the Door Peninsula in 1930, reaching its present-day terminus in Sister Bay. This routing from Milwaukee to Sister Bay stayed mostly the same until the 1990s, with a few minor exceptions. WIS 57 was rerouted onto its current alignment between Hilbert and Askeaton in 1932, replacing a former routing to Hollandtown; the original routing was replaced by county roads. The highway was also realigned between Plymouth and Kiel in 1956, and the former route became part of WIS 67.

When the federal government was planning the Interstate Highway System in the 1950s, Wisconsin proposed that the WIS 57 corridor become the route of an Interstate Highway. The state wanted an Interstate to connect Milwaukee and Green Bay, two of Wisconsin's largest cities. Their plan chose the WIS 57 route over the nearby US 41 and US 141 corridors; the state did not want the Interstate's route to favor either the port cities of Manitowoc and Sheboygan or the inland cities of Appleton, Fond du Lac and Oshkosh. Wisconsin wanted to designate the highway as I-57 to preserve the highway's number; while this numbering would have fit in the west–east Interstate number scheme, an I-57 was already planned in Illinois and Missouri. The state's proposal was ultimately rejected, and I-43 was built on the US 141 corridor along the lakeshore instead. The US 41 corridor eventually became I-41 in 2015, providing Interstate access to all the cities the WIS 57 routing would not have favored.

WisDOT rerouted WIS 57 in south Ozaukee County during the early 1990s in response to local municipalities who complained about heavy traffic on the road. This realignment signed the highway along WIS 167 and I-43 to avoid entering the downtown areas of Mequon, Thiensville, Grafton and Cedarburg. WIS 57's former routing became extensions of County Trunk Highway W (CTH-W). This realignment plan also turned WIS 143 over to the county and extended WIS 181 northward from WIS 167 to WIS 60.

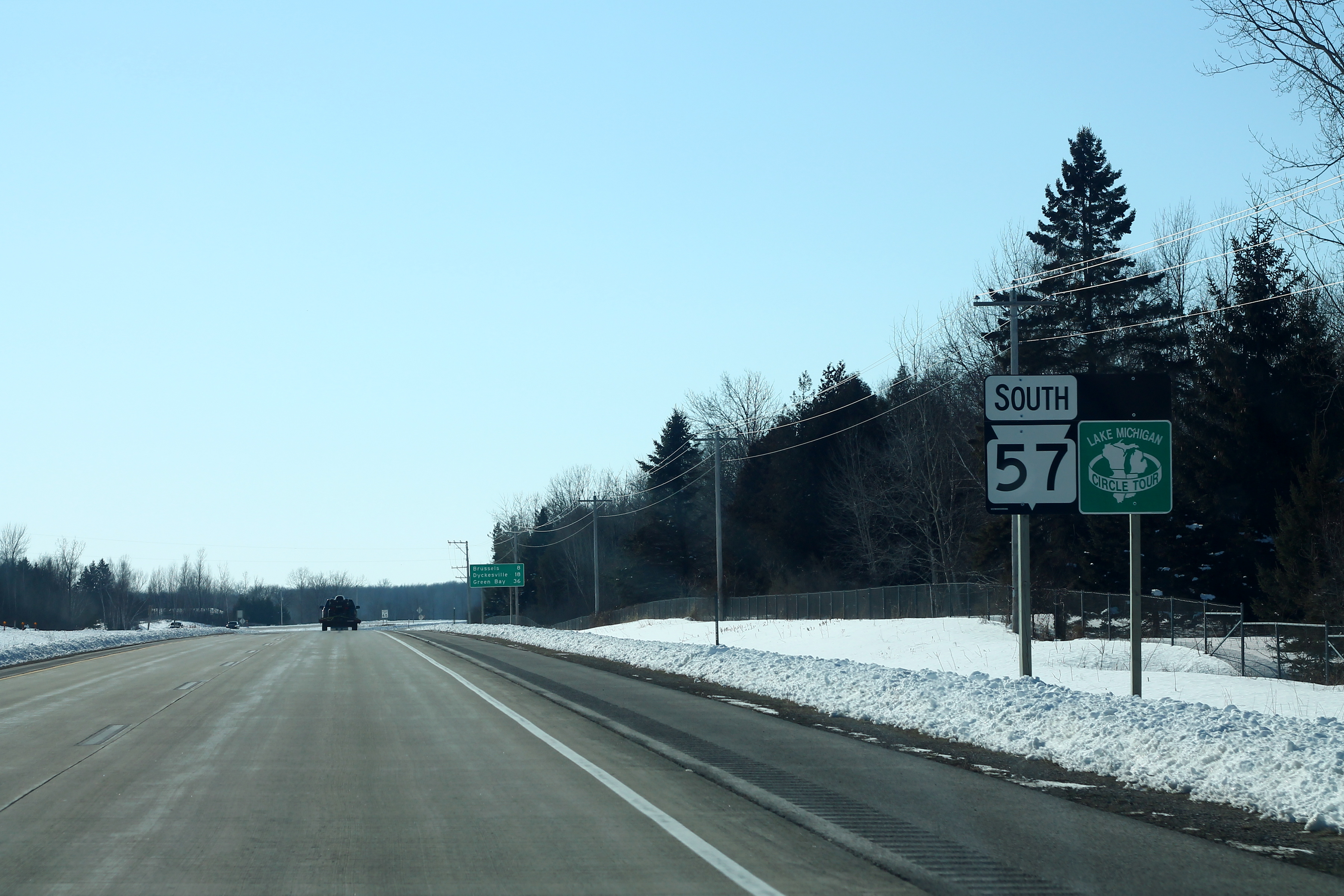
Lake Michigan Circle Tour sign in Nasewaupee along the expanded highway

A WisDOT project rebuilt and widened the stretch of WIS 57 between WIS 54 and WIS 42, between Sturgeon Bay and Green Bay, a primary route to the Door Peninsula, to four lanes between 1999 and 2008. This section had been a two-lane highway, but traffic during the vacation season caused long delays and made an expansion necessary. The heavy traffic also resulted in the deaths of eighteen people on this section between 1994 and 1997, earning the highway the nickname "Bloody 57" among locals. The results of extensive archeological excavations made in connection with the project are detailed along with a discussion of the highway expansion in informational kiosks at the CTH-C park and ride lot in Door County and at Wequiock Falls in Brown County. The project began in 1999 when the interchange between WIS 54 and WIS 57 was rebuilt as Phase I of the project. Phase 2 widened WIS 57 to four lanes on the 8 miles (13 km) between WIS 54 and Dyckesville during 2002 and 2003. The first section of four-lane road officially opened on December 2, 2003. WisDOT then began Phase 3 of the project, which widened the rest of the highway through the WIS 42 junction. The first part of this phase, a 6-mile (9.7 km) bypass of Dyckesville that reached the Door-Kewaunee county line, opened on December 1, 2006. The entire project was completed on October 6, 2008, when the last 11-mile (18 km) section near Sturgeon Bay was officially opened.

== Major intersections ==
County	Location	mi	km	Exit	Destinations	Notes
Milwaukee	Milwaukee	0.0	0.0		WIS 59 (National Avenue)	
Milwaukee	Milwaukee	0.8	1.3		I-94	Access to I-94 via St. Paul Avenue
Milwaukee	Milwaukee	1.5	2.4		US 18 west (Highland Boulevard)	Southern end of concurrency with US 18
Milwaukee	Milwaukee	2.2	3.5		US 18 east	Northern end of concurrency with US 18
Milwaukee	Milwaukee	3.1	5.0		WIS 145 south (Fond du Lac Avenue)	Southern end of concurrency with WIS 145
Milwaukee	Milwaukee	3.4	5.5		WIS 145 north (Fond du Lac Avenue)	Northern end of concurrency with WIS 145
Milwaukee	Milwaukee	6.2	10.0		WIS 190 – Pewaukee	
Milwaukee	Milwaukee	6.3	10.1		I-43 south	Northbound entrance ramp can be accessed via WIS 190 and 7th Street
Milwaukee	Brown Deer	13.0	20.9		WIS 100 – Wauwatosa	Former interchange
Ozaukee	Thiensville	16.2	26.1		WIS 167 west – Holy Hill	Southern end of concurrency with WIS 167
Ozaukee	Thiensville	19.3	31.1	85	I-43 south / WIS 32 south / WIS 167 ends / LMCT	Southern end of concurrency with I-43 and WIS 32; northern end of concurrency with WIS 167
Ozaukee	Town of Grafton			89	CTH-C – Cedarburg	
Ozaukee	Ulao	26.2	42.2	92	WIS 60 west – Cedarburg	
Ozaukee	Grafton	27.6	44.4	93	WIS 32 north / CTH-V south / LMCT – Port Washington, Grafton	Northern end of concurrency with WIS 32
Ozaukee	Saukville	30.7	49.4	96	WIS 33 – Saukville, Port Washington	
Ozaukee	Saukville	31.5	50.7		I-43 north – Green Bay	Northbound exit and southbound entrance; northern end of concurrency with I-43
Sheboygan	Random Lake	43.3	69.7		WIS 144 west – West Bend	
Sheboygan	Waldo	50.9	81.9		WIS 28 south – Kewaskum	Southern end of concurrency with WIS 28
Sheboygan	Waldo	51.4	82.7		WIS 28 north – Sheboygan	Northern end of concurrency with WIS 28
Sheboygan	Plymouth	56.6	91.1		WIS 23 – Fond du Lac, Sheboygan	
Manitowoc	Millhome	66.2	106.5		WIS 32 south – Howards Grove, Sheboygan	Southern end of concurrency with WIS 32
Manitowoc	Kiel	69.8	112.3		WIS 67	Roundabout
Calumet	Chilton	81.0	130.4		US 151 north – Manitowoc	Southern end of concurrency with US 151
Calumet	Chilton	81.8	131.6		US 151 south – Fond du Lac, Madison	Northern end of concurrency with US 151
Calumet	Hilbert	89.4	143.9		WIS 114 west – Neenah	
Calumet	Forest Junction	94.5	152.1		US 10 – Appleton, Manitowoc	Roundabout
Brown	Greenleaf	102.3	164.6		WIS 96 – Wrightstown, Denmark	Roundabout
Brown	De Pere			—	CTH-PP south (Broadway Street) – Reedsville	Southbound exit and northbound entrance
Brown	De Pere	112.1	180.4		WIS 32 north (Main Avenue)	Northern end of concurrency with WIS 32
Brown	Allouez	114.4	184.1		WIS 172 – Hobart	
Brown	Green Bay	116.9	188.1		WIS 54 west – Seymour, Waupaca	Southern end of concurrency with WIS 54
Brown	Green Bay	117.4	188.9		WIS 29 west – Shawano	Southern end of concurrency with WIS 29
Brown	Green Bay	117.7	189.4		US 141 / WIS 29 east – Kewaunee	Northern end of concurrency with WIS 29
Brown	Green Bay	120.6	194.1	—	I-43 / LMCT – Milwaukee	Southwestern end of freeway
Brown	Green Bay			—	University Avenue; Nicolet Drive	
Brown	Green Bay			—	CTH-EA (Huron Road/Bay Settlement Road)	
Brown	Green Bay	125.1	201.3	—	WIS 54 east / CTH-I west – Algoma, Luxemburg	Northern end of concurrency with WIS 54, northeastern end of freeway, southern end of Expressway
Brown	Town of Green Bay			—	CTH-P south / CTH-DK north – Dyckesville	
Kewaunee	No major junctions					
Door	Maplewood	154.1	248.0		WIS 42 south / LMCT – Algoma	Southern end of concurrency with WIS 42
Door	Sturgeon Bay	159.1	256.0	—	Bus. WIS 42 / Bus. WIS 57	Northbound exit and southbound entrance
Door	Sturgeon Bay			Bridge over Sturgeon Bay		
Door	Sturgeon Bay	163.5	263.1		Bus. WIS 42 / Bus. WIS 57	Roundabout
Door	Sevastopol	164.9	265.4		WIS 42 north / LMCT – Egg Harbor, Fish Creek	Northern end of concurrency with WIS 42
Door	Sister Bay	191.82	308.70		WIS 42 / LMCT – Ephraim, Ellison Bay	
1.000 mi = 1.609 km; 1.000 km = 0.621 mi: Concurrency terminus; Incomplete access

== Special route ==
Business State Trunk Highway 57
- Location: Sturgeon Bay
- Length: 3.55 mi (5.71 km)
- Existed: c. 1977–present

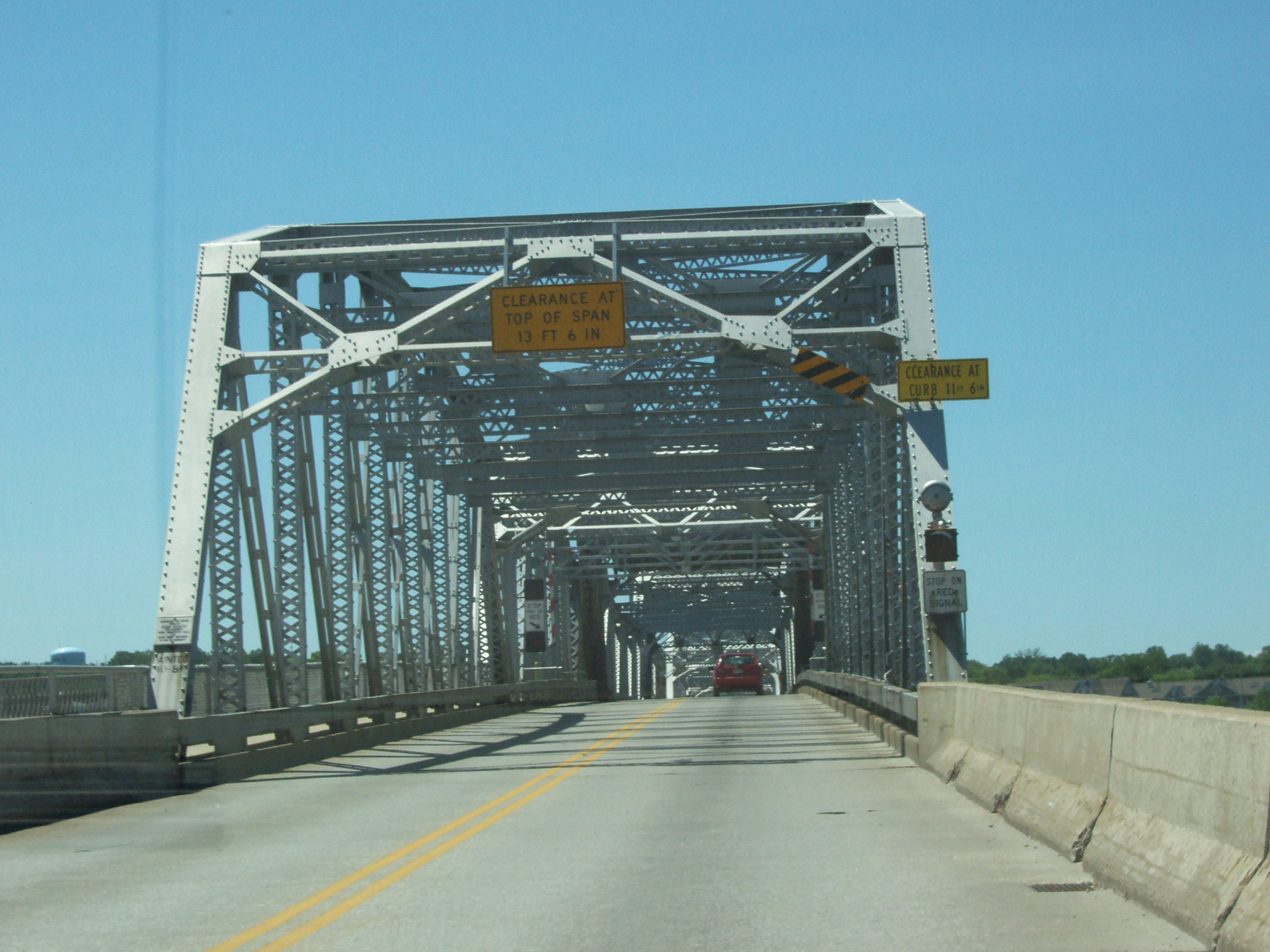
Michigan Street Bridge

Business State Trunk Highway 57 (Bus. WIS 57) in Sturgeon Bay, which runs concurrently with Bus. WIS 42, is 3.55 miles (5.71 km) long and connects to downtown Sturgeon Bay, which WIS 42 and WIS 57 bypass. It is cosigned as a business route of both WIS 42 and WIS 57 because it splits off of the concurrency of the two highways at both of its ends. Like most auxiliary state highways in Wisconsin, Bus. WIS /Bus. WIS 57 is locally maintained.

Bus. WIS /Bus. WIS 57 crossed Sturgeon Bay via the Michigan Street Bridge, a historic drawbridge near downtown Sturgeon Bay, until September 2008. This bridge was built in 1930 and is 1,420 feet (430 m) long. The bridge is one of only three crossings of Sturgeon Bay, the others being the WIS 42/WIS 57 bridge and the recently opened Maple and Oregon Streets Bridge. It was placed on the National Register of Historic Places on January 17, 2008. The bridge was closed to all traffic in July 2008 after the Wisconsin Department of Transportation stated that the weight limit was not being enforced, though it was reopened to light traffic after two days. It was again closed to all traffic when the Maple and Oregon Streets Bridge opened in September 2008, and Bus. WIS /Bus. WIS 57 was expanded over this bridge while the older bridge was repaired.

== See also ==
- Door County Coastal Byway (WIS 57 north of Sturgeon Bay to Northport is classified as a Wisconsin Scenic Byway and National Scenic Byway.)
