= Institute, Wisconsin =

- Unincorporated community
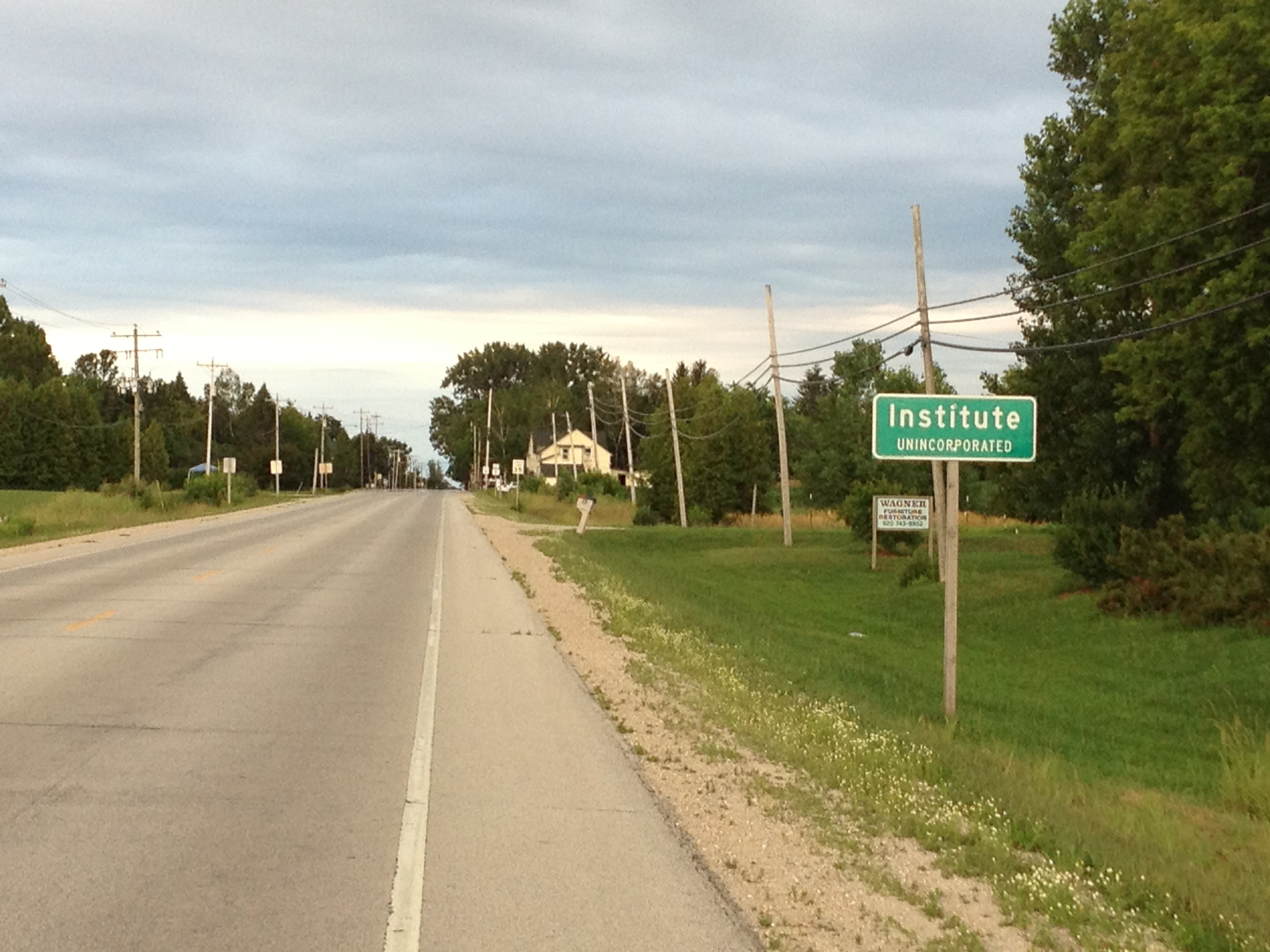
- Institute, Wisconsin, 2013, Wisconsin Highway 57, looking south toward town

- Location within the state of Wisconsin
- Coordinates: 44°53′36″N 87°17′13″W
- Country: United States
- State: Wisconsin
- County: Door
- Town: Sevastopol
- Elevation: 686 ft (209 m)
- Time zone: UTC-6 (Central (CST))
  - Summer (DST): UTC-5 (CDT)
- Area code: 920
- FIPS code
- GNIS feature ID: 1566943

Institute is an unincorporated community on Highway 57 in the town of Sevastopol, Door County, Wisconsin, United States.

Institute was named for a Roman Catholic boarding school that once stood there.

== Town Hall ==
In 2009, a new town hall building on the south side of Institute was finished, located near the Sevastopol School District buildings and adjoining the Sevastopol Town Park.

== Gallery ==
Dairy barn near Institute, 1980

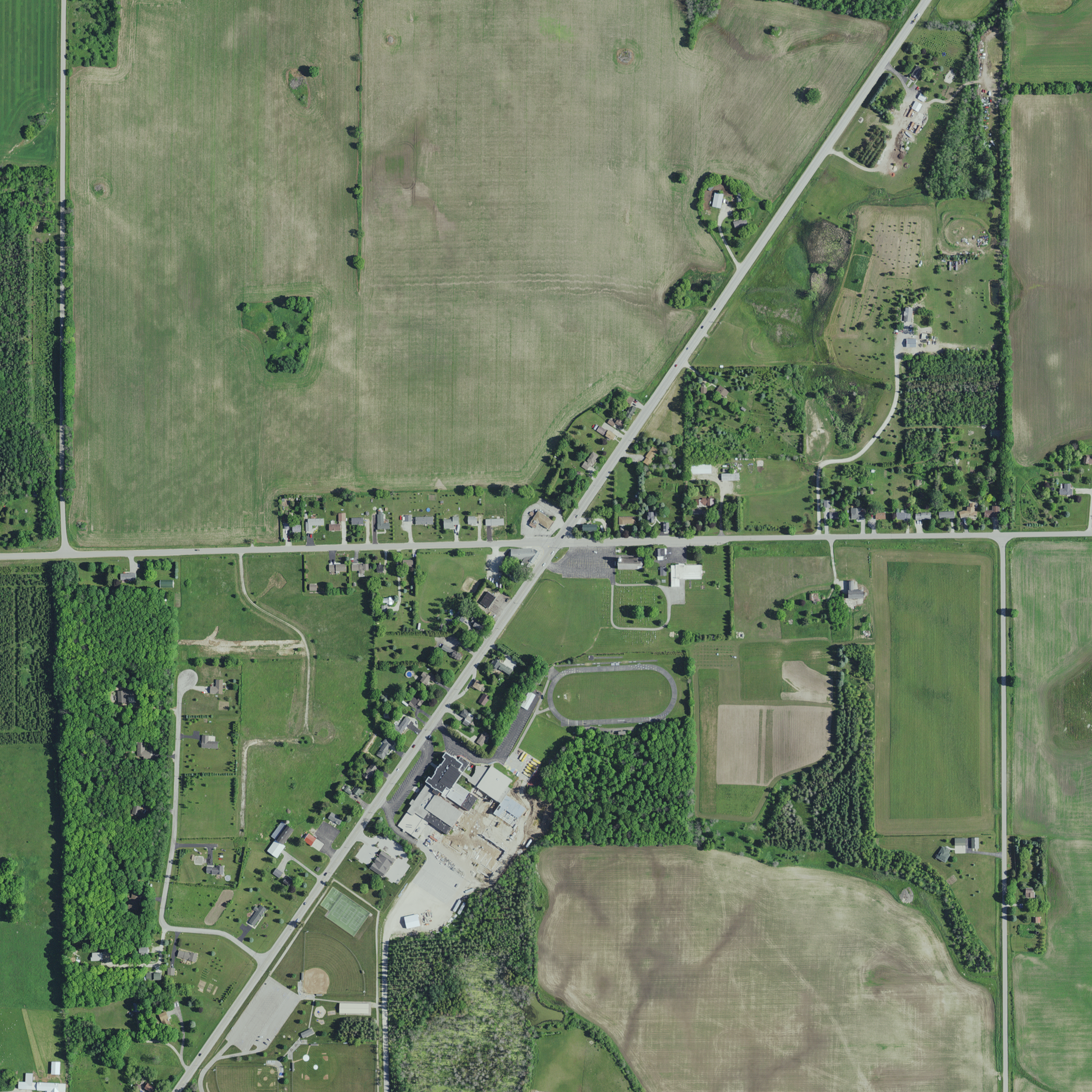
Institute on June 27, 2020, with the town hall and school buildings in the lower part of the photo
