= Millhome, Wisconsin =

- Unincorporated community
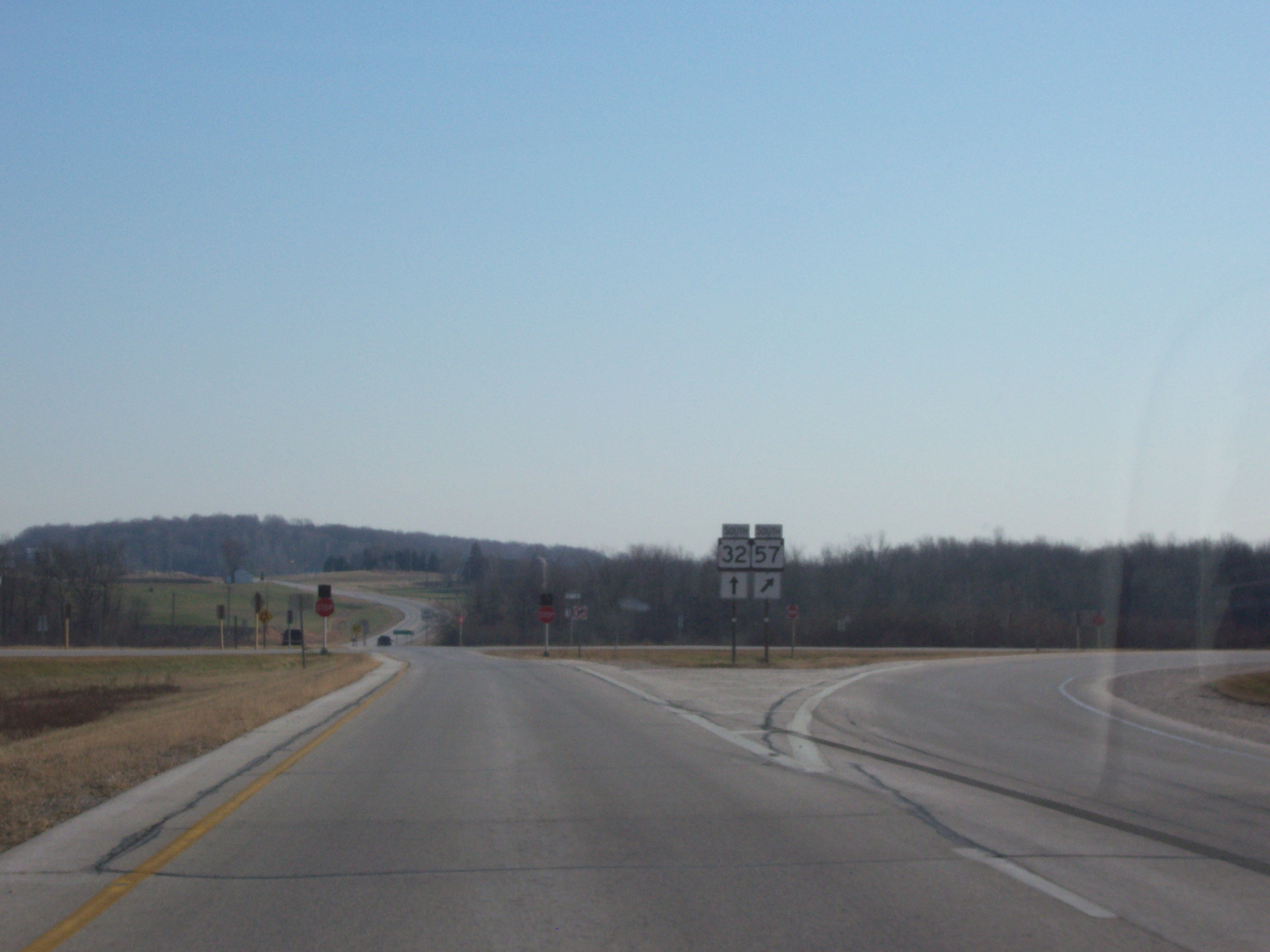
- Wisconsin Highway 32 meets Wisconsin Highway 57 in Millhome

- Location within Wisconsin
- Coordinates: 43°53′42″N 87°57′44″W
- Country: United States
- State: Wisconsin
- County: Manitowoc
- Elevation: 892 ft (272 m)
- Time zone: UTC-6 (Central (CST))
  - Summer (DST): UTC-5 (CDT)
- Area code: 920
- GNIS feature ID: 1569523

Millhome is an unincorporated community in the town of Schleswig, Manitowoc County, Wisconsin, United States. The nearest city to Millhome is Kiel. The community is located just west of the intersection of Wisconsin Highway 32 and Wisconsin Highway 57 and is along the border between Manitowoc and Sheboygan Counties. The Sheboygan River passes through the community.
