= Tri-County News (Kiel, Wisconsin) =

- Type: Weekly newspaper (Thursday)
- Format: Broadsheet
- Owner(s): O'Rourke Media Group
- Publisher: Jim O'Rourke
- Editor: Mark Sherry
- Headquarters: 606 Fremont Street; Kiel, WI 53042; United States
- Circulation: 4,027 (as of 2022)
- Website: iwantthenews.com

The Tri-County News is a weekly newspaper based in Kiel, Wisconsin.

== History ==
The newspaper was founded when the New Holstein Reporter, Kiel Tri-County Record, and Chilton Spirit were combined.

== Distribution ==
The Tri-County News is primarily distributed in Calumet County, Manitowoc County, Sheboygan and Fond du Lac County. The newspaper is the official publication of the cities of Kiel, New Holstein, Kiel Area Schools, New Holstein Area Schools, and the towns of Schleswig, Russell, Meeme, and New Holstein.

== Memberships ==
The newspaper is a member of the Wisconsin Newspapers Association, National Newspaper Association, and Inland Press Association.
