= List of Wisconsin Scenic Byways =

Wisconsin Scenic Byways
- Highway marker for Wisconsin's scenic byways

Highway names
- Interstates: Interstate X (I-X)
- US Highways: U.S. Highway X (US X)
- State: (State Trunk) Highway X (STH-X or WIS X)
- Rustic Roads: Rustic Road RX

System links
- Wisconsin State Trunk Highway System; Interstate; US; State; Scenic; Rustic

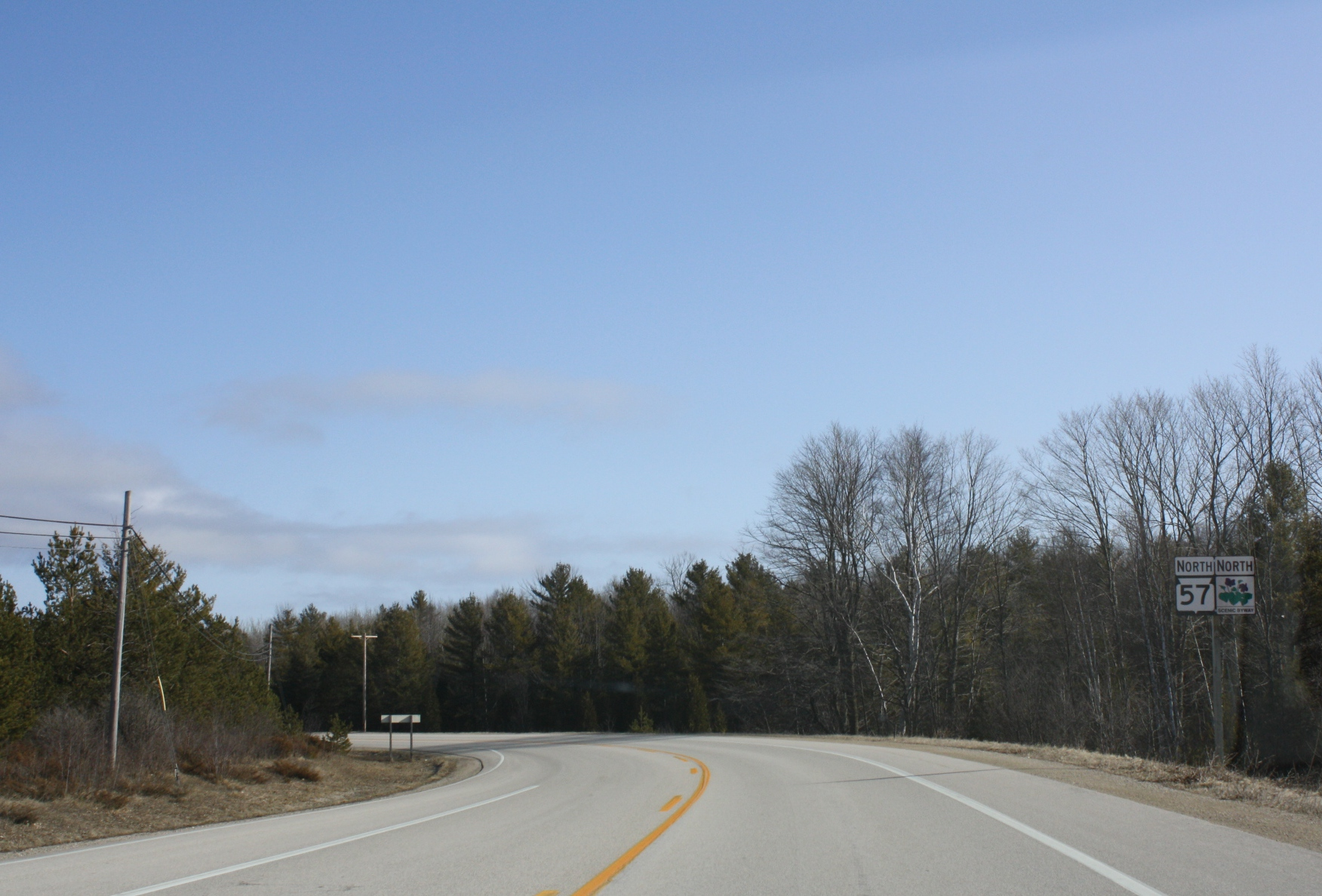
Sign on Door County Coastal Byway

The Wisconsin Scenic Byways are a system consisting of roads in the U.S. state of Wisconsin that travel through areas of scenic and historic interest. The intent of this system is to promote tourism and raise awareness of the communities along these routes. Wisconsin also has another system of scenic highways called Rustic Roads. There are five state-recognized scenic byways in Wisconsin, and three of them have also been designated National Scenic Byways.

== Byways ==
=== Door County Coastal Byway ===
Door County Coastal Byway
- Location: Sturgeon Bay–Northport
- Length: 66 mi (106 km)

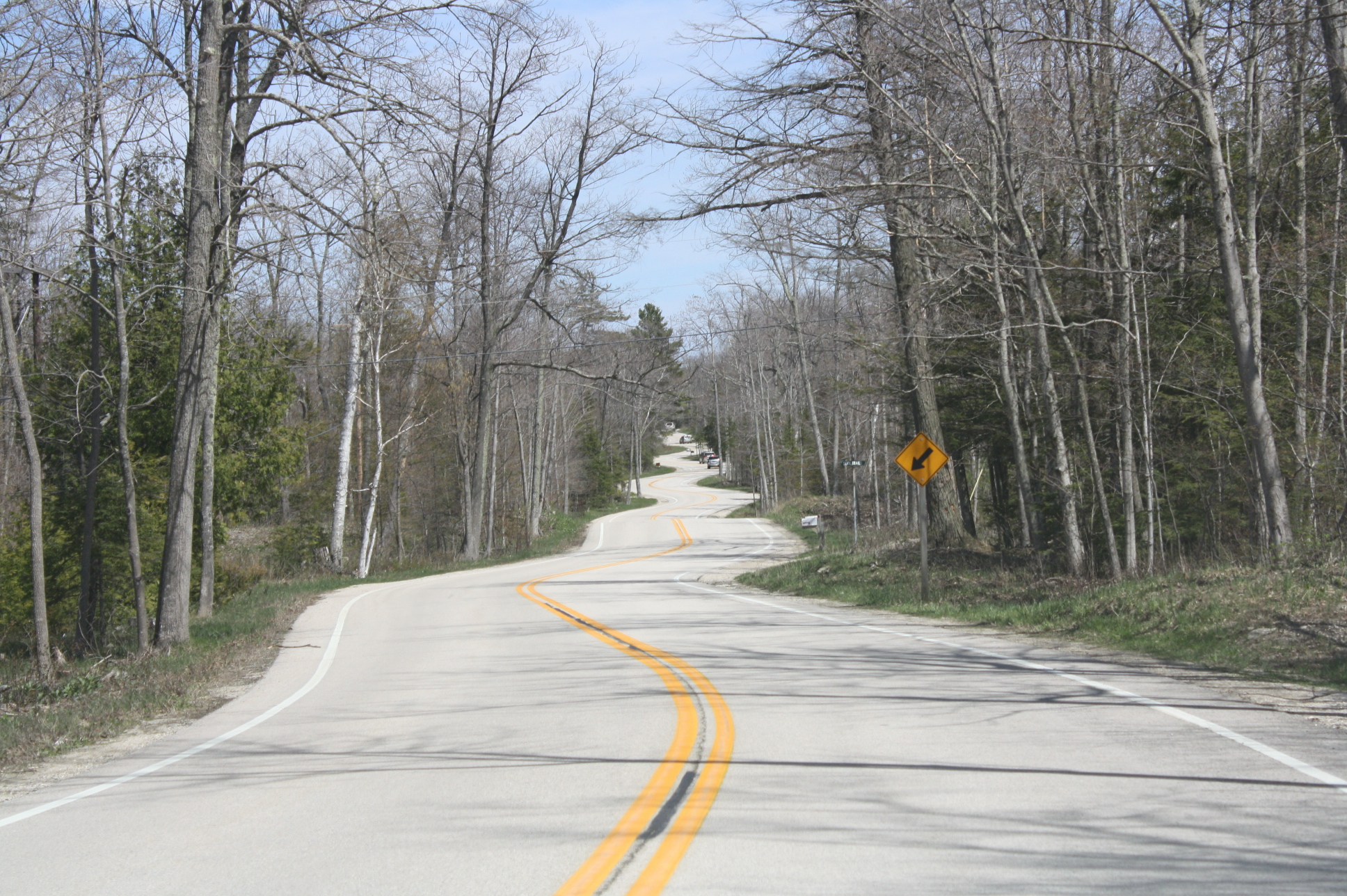
Door County Coastal Byway

The Door County Coastal Byway is a 66-mile (106 km) loop beginning and ending at the intersection of WIS 42 and WIS 57 by Sturgeon Bay. The loop follows WIS 42 and WIS 57 along the coasts of Lake Michigan and Green Bay in Door County. Highlights include orchards, vineyards, and forests. Visitor attractions include shopping, several lighthouses, three state parks (Peninsula, Newport, and Whitefish Dunes), and 10 county parks. Natural highlights includes vistas from the Niagara Escarpment and shores of Lake Michigan or Green Bay. The Ridges Sanctuary, a National Natural Landmark, is located near WIS 57 by Baileys Harbor. Country magazine named the byway on their Top 10 Best Scenic Roads list in 2013.

In February 2021, the byway was designated as a National Scenic Byway.

=== Lower Wisconsin River Road ===
Lower Wisconsin River Road
- Location: Near Lodi–Prairie du Chien
- Length: 100 mi (160 km)

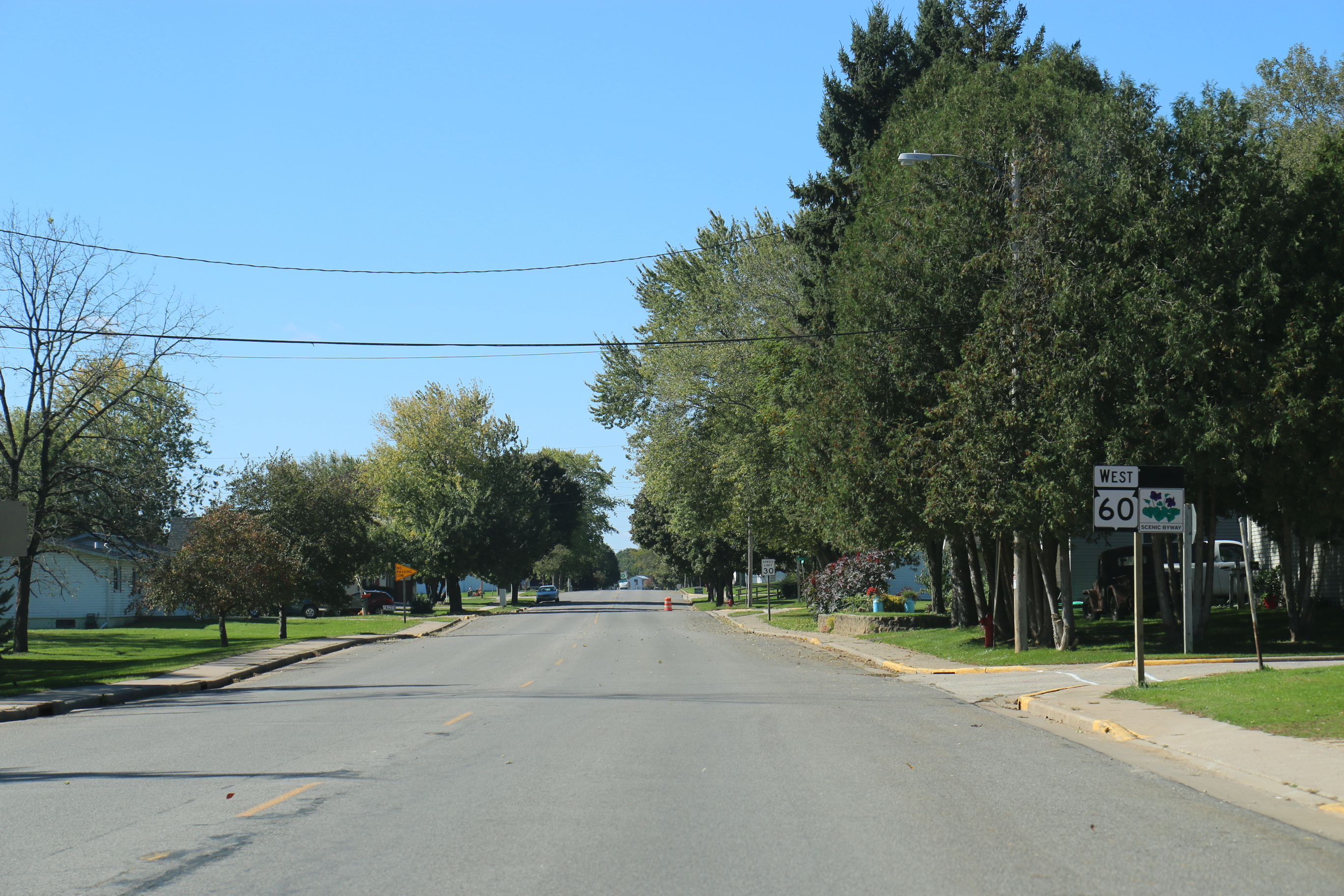
The Lower Wisconsin River Road in Wauzeka

The Lower Wisconsin River Road is a 100-mile-long (160 km) segment along WIS 60. Highlights of the route include Frank Lloyd Wright's summer home, Taliesin, and potentially-Wright-inspired House on the Rock along with several battlefields for the Black Hawk War.

=== Nicolet–Wolf River Scenic Byway ===
Nicolet–Wolf River Scenic Byway
- Location: Forest, Langlade, Oneida and Vilas counties
- Length: 145 mi (233 km)
- Existed: August 22, 2017–present

The Nicolet–Wolf River Scenic Byway is a 145-mile-long (233 km) byway connecting the Nicolet National Forest with the Wolf River, a National Scenic River in Forest, Langlade, Oneida and Vilas counties. It follows WIS 55, WIS 32, WIS 52 and WIS 70.

=== Wisconsin Great River Road ===
Wisconsin Great River Road
- Location: Kieler–Prescott
- Length: 250 mi (400 km)

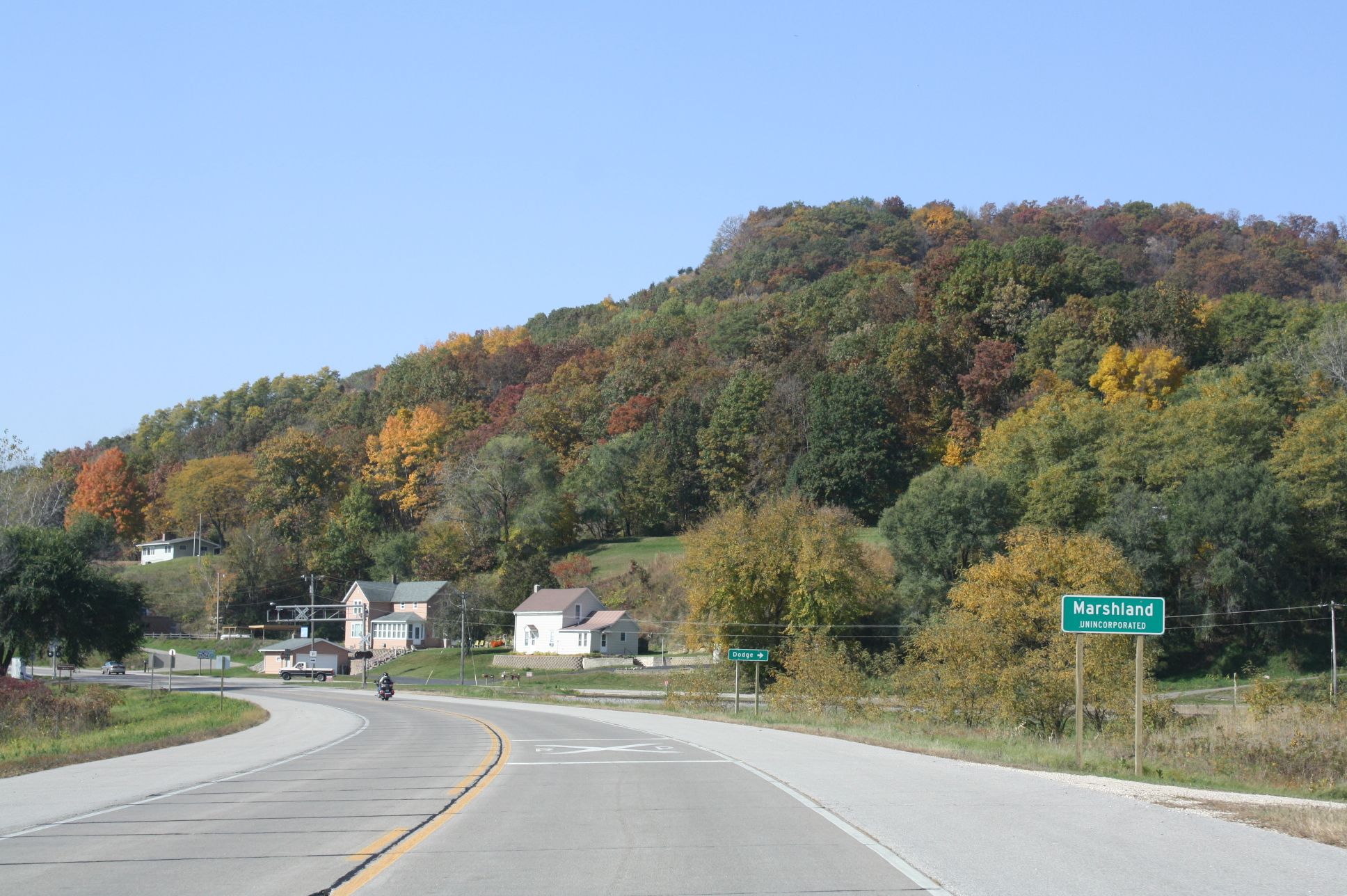
Great River Road at Marshland

The Wisconsin Great River Road consists of 250 miles (400 km) of highway along the Mississippi River on the Great River Road. It is the only All American Road designated in the state.

=== Wisconsin Lake Superior Byway ===
Wisconsin Lake Superior Byway
- Location: Near Ashland

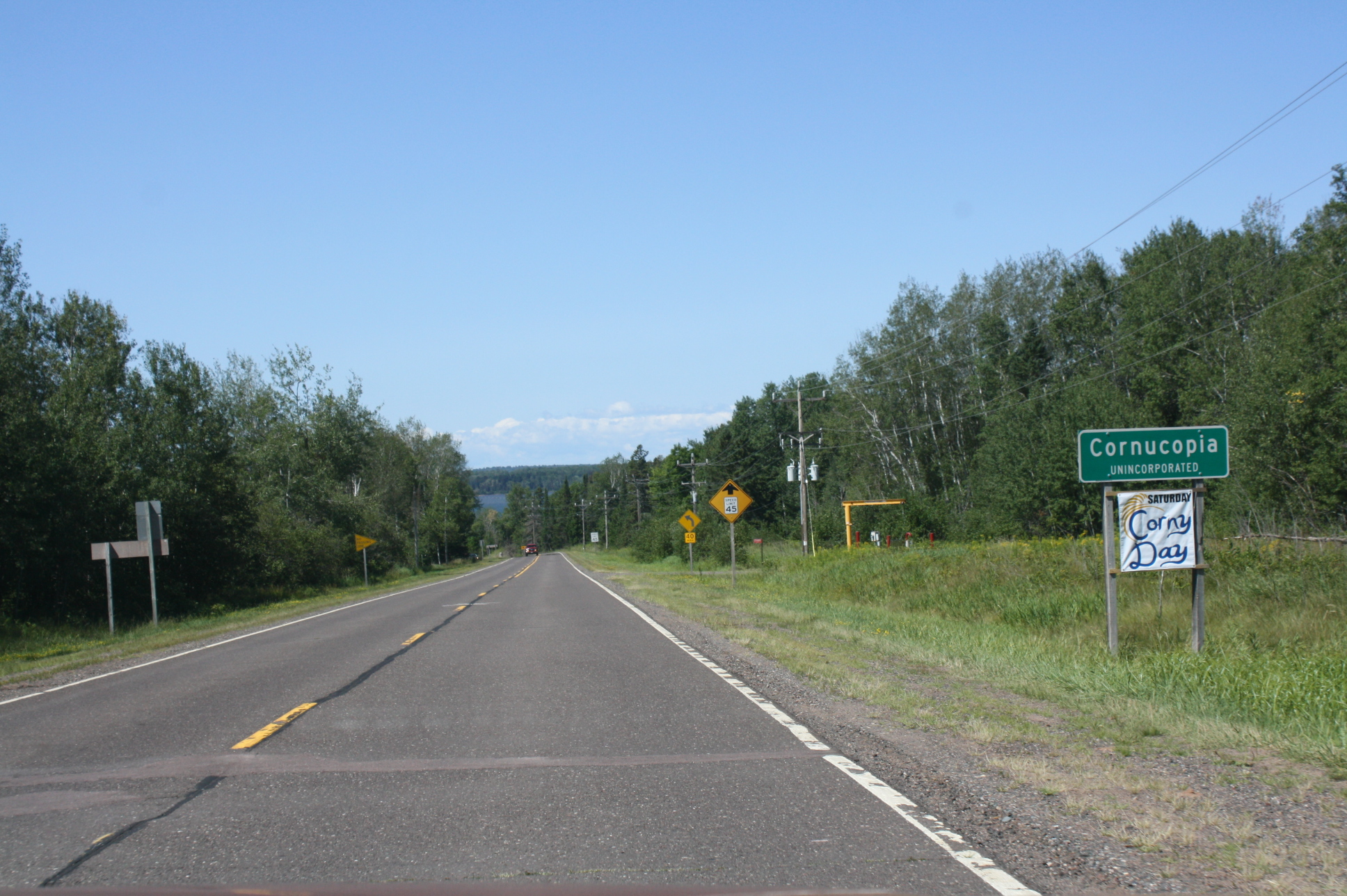
Wisconsin Lake Superior Byway at Cornucopia

The Wisconsin Lake Superior Byway is a 70-mile (110 km) segment of WIS 13 and the Lake Superior Circle Tour near the coast of Lake Superior through fishing towns. Highlights include the Apostle Islands National Lakeshore and the Red Cliff Band of Lake Superior Chippewa reservation. In February 2021, the byway was designated as a National Scenic Byway.
