= Wisconsin Highway 75 =

Highway in Wisconsin

State Trunk Highway 75
- WIS 75 highlighted in red

Route information
- Maintained by WisDOT
- Length: 12.10 mi (19.47 km)
- Existed: 1924–2024

Major junctions
- South end: WIS 50 / WIS 83 in Paddock Lake
- North end: WIS 20 in Waterford

Location
- Country: United States
- State: Wisconsin
- Counties: Kenosha, Racine

Highway system
- Wisconsin State Trunk Highway System; Interstate; US; State; Scenic; Rustic
← WIS 74	→ WIS 76

State Trunk Highway 75 (often called Highway 75, STH-75 or WIS 75) is a former 12.10-mile-long (19.47 km) state highway in the southeastern part of U.S. state of Wisconsin. The highway ran from WIS 50 and WIS 83 in Paddock Lake north to WIS 20 east of Waterford. WIS 75 serves Kenosha and Racine counties. The highway was maintained by the Wisconsin Department of Transportation (WisDOT), and it is now signed as County Trunk Highway BD (CTH-BD) by Racine and Kenosha counties.

== Route description ==
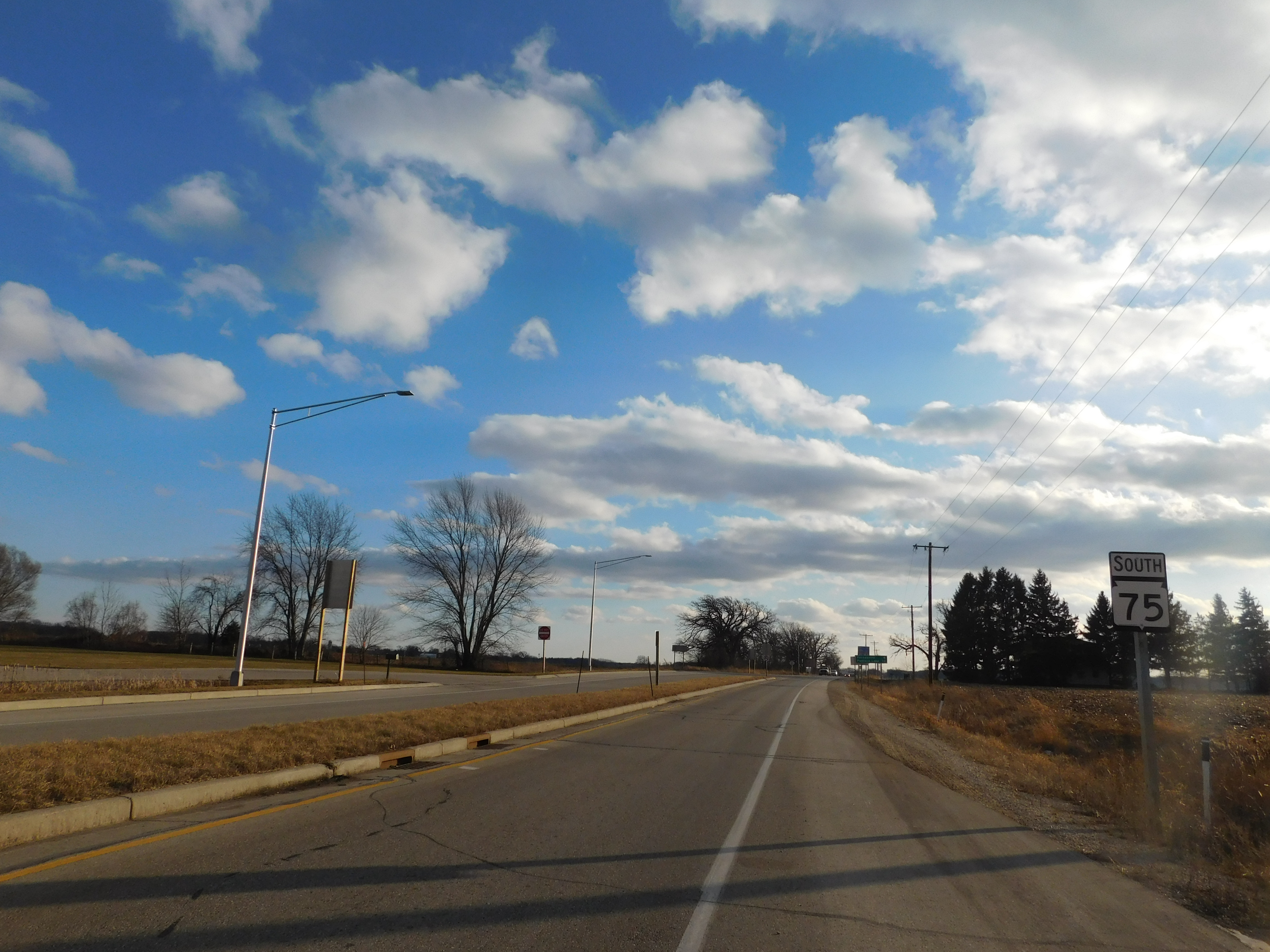
WIS 75 southbound from WIS 20 in Waterford

WIS 75 began at an intersection with WIS 50 and WIS 83 in Paddock Lake. The highway headed north through the town of Salem before entering the town of Brighton. After crossing into Brighton, WIS 75 passed through the community of Klondike and skirted the eastern edge of the Richard Bong State Recreation Area. The route intersected WIS 142 northwest of the community of Brighton and continued northward into Racine County.

Upon entering Racine County, WIS 75 enters the town of Dover. It passed through the community of Kansasville and crosses a Canadian Pacific Railway line before meeting WIS 11. The highway continued north, passing Eagle Lake to the east before ending at a junction with WIS 20 and County Highway S east of Waterford.

== History ==
WIS 75 was originally designated in Milwaukee County between WIS 36 and WIS 19 (now US Highway 18 [US 18]) in 1917. In 1924, WIS 75 was changed to a route from Franklin south to Bristol; the northern terminus was truncated to WIS 36 in 1926. This route became part of US 45 in 1934, and WIS 75 was moved to a route similar to its last one. The original route followed present-day WIS 142 west before continuing south and west on present-day CTH-X, CTH-JB, and CTH-PH; the route between WIS 142 and CTH-PH was changed to 264th Avenue in 1935. During the construction of the Richard I. Bong Air Force Base in the 1950s, WIS 75 was rerouted along present-day WIS 142, US 45, and WIS 50 south of its junction with WIS 142. WIS 75 was permanently designated along its last route between WIS 142 and WIS 50 in 1963.

WIS 75 has since been turned over to county maintenance after WisDOT received former CTH-KR and redesignated it as WIS 195.

== Major intersections ==
County	Location	mi	km	Destinations	Notes
Kenosha	Paddock Lake	0.0	0.0	WIS 50 / WIS 83 – Lake Geneva, Salem, Kenosha	
Kenosha	Town of Brighton	5.0	8.0	WIS 142 – Burlington, Kenosha	
Racine	Kansasville	8.4	13.5	WIS 11 – Burlington, Janesville, Union Grove, Racine	
Racine	Town of Dover	12.1	19.5	WIS 20 – Waterford, Racine	
1.000 mi = 1.609 km; 1.000 km = 0.621 mi
