= R.I. Bong Air Force Base =

Richard I. Bong Air Force Base
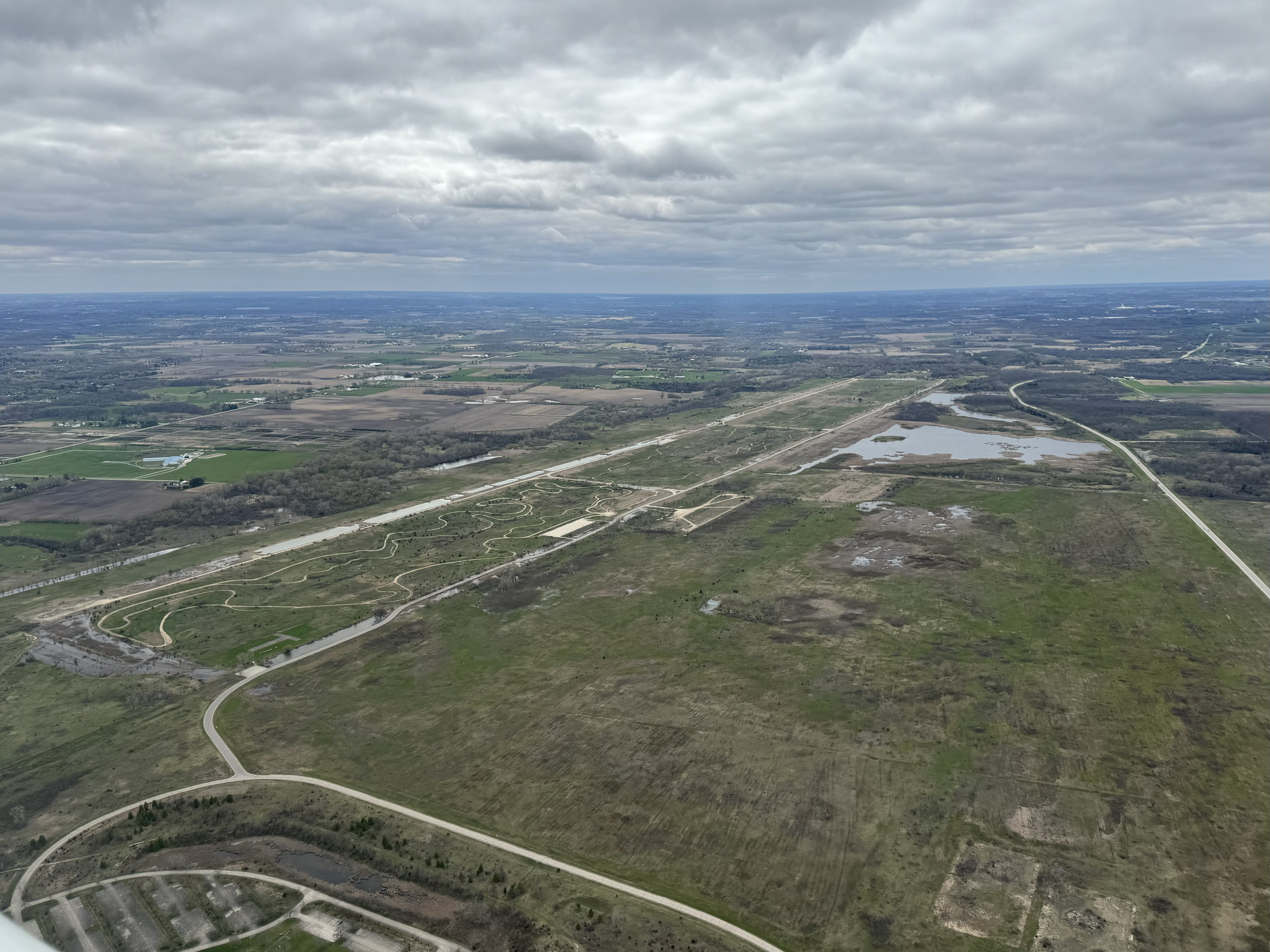
- Remains of Bong AFB, April 2024

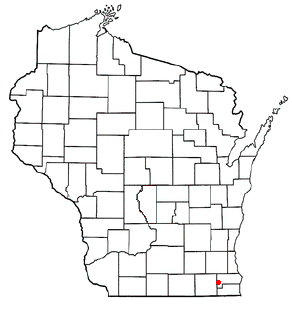
- Location of Richard I. Bong Air Force Base
- IATA: none; ICAO: none

Summary
- Airport type: Military
- Owner: United States Air Force
- Location: Brighton, Kenosha County, Wisconsin
- Elevation AMSL: 803 ft (245 m)
- Coordinates: 42°38′14.62″N 88°8′56.81″W
- Interactive map of Richard I. Bong Air Force Base

Runways
Direction	Length		Surface
Direction	ft	m	Surface
15/31	12,900	3,932	Concrete (planned)

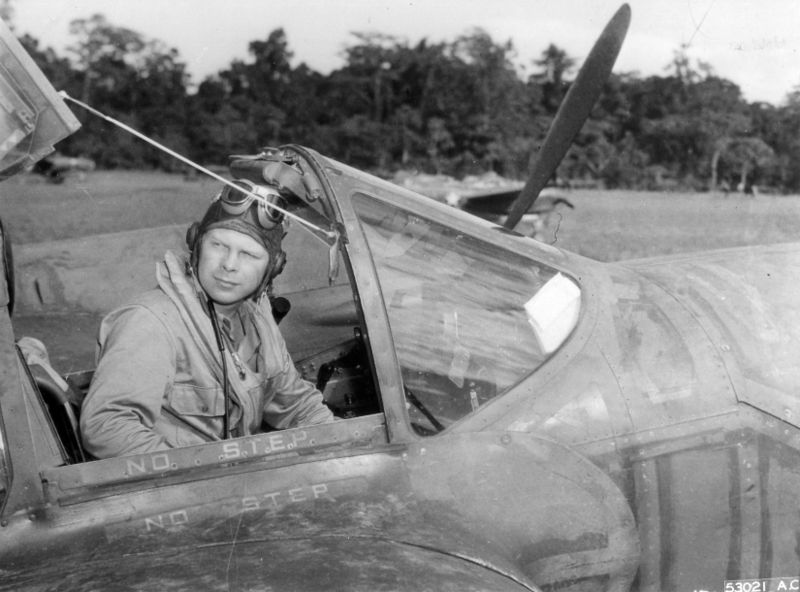
Richard Ira Bong in his P-38

Richard I. Bong Air Force Base is an unfinished Air Force base. It was named after World War II aviator Major Richard Ira Bong. The base was intended to be an air defense fighter base for the Chicago and Milwaukee areas. It was conceived in the early 1950s and construction began in the mid-1950s. Construction had barely begun when the base was transferred to the Strategic Air Command. Eventually, the base was considered obsolete as it had become apparent to Air Force officials that the base would be redundant with installations nearby that would soon have space for more units. The base was abandoned in 1959 and disposed of the following year.

The base is not to be confused with the planned renaming of Spokane Air Force Base, Washington, as Bong Air Force Base, which was the planned name of that facility until General Muir Fairchild died on active duty in 1950, cementing "Fairchild" onto the name of the current Fairchild Air Force Base.

== History ==
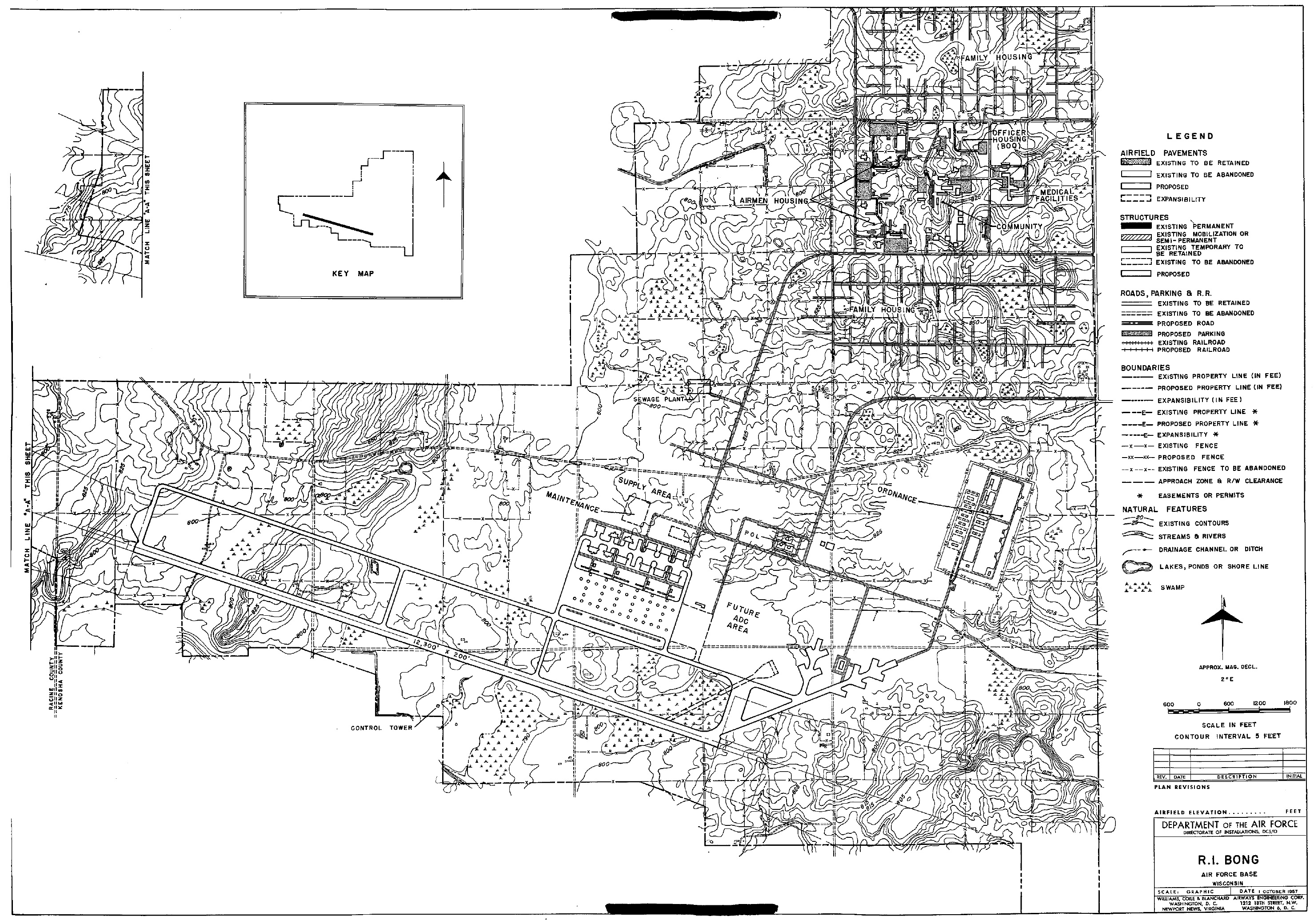
Plans for the layout of the base

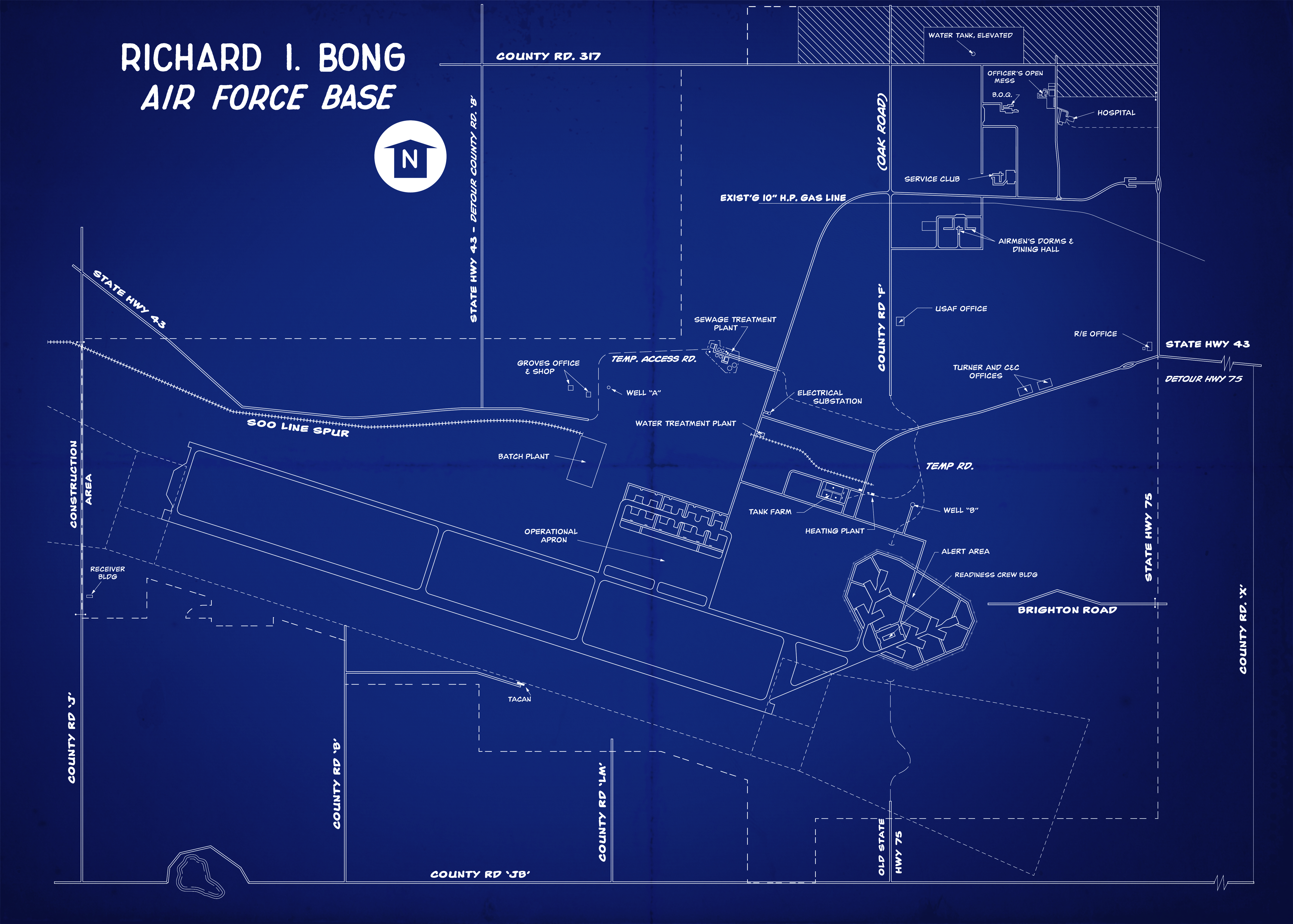
Map of the Bong Air Force Base construction in progress when project was halted

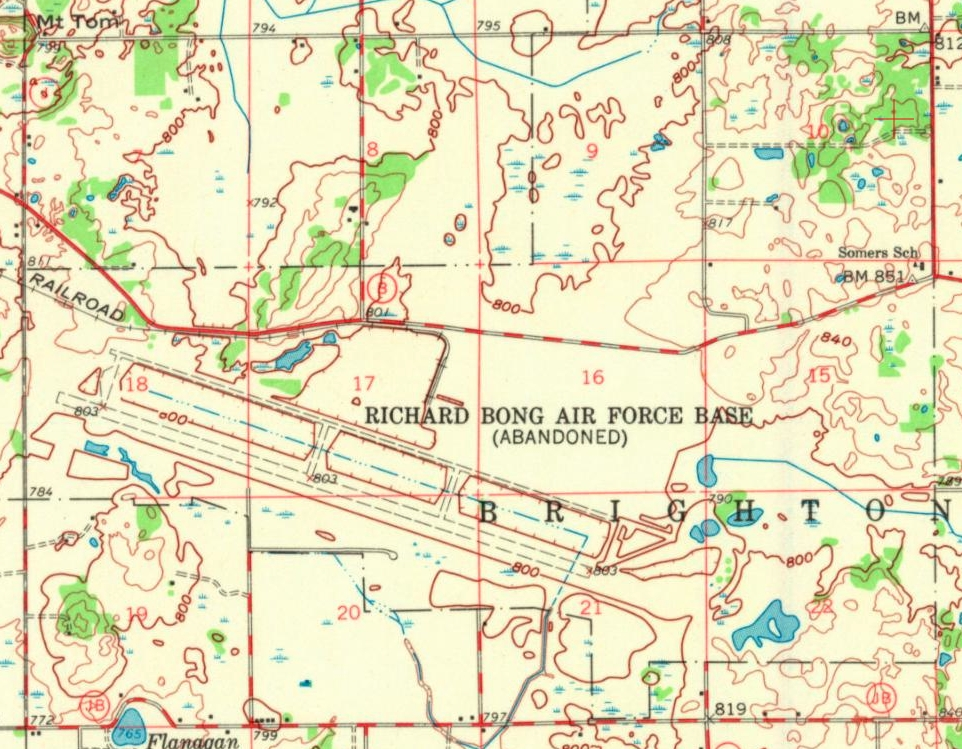
1962 Topographical Map of Abandoned Bong Air Force Base

=== Major commands to which assigned ===
- Aerospace Defense Command (1954–1957)
- Strategic Air Command (1957–1959)

=== Base operating units ===
- 56th Fighter-Interceptor Wing
  - 56th Fighter-Interceptor Group
    - 62d Fighter-Interceptor Squadron
    - 63d Fighter-Interceptor Squadron
- 4040th Air Base Squadron (1957–1959)

=== Operational history ===
The idea of an air force base for the Chicago area began in 1951 when it was realized that the air traffic at O'Hare International Airport would soon oversaturate control facilities. The United States Air Force then instructed the Air Defense Command to study the possibility of locating a base which would house two fighter-interceptor squadrons within a 70-mile radius from the city. The aim of the base was to protect the Milwaukee and Chicago areas from attack by Soviet bombers. A survey team then selected a site south of the unincorporated community of Kansasville, Wisconsin. On August 30, 1954, the Air Defense Command requested funds for development of the site. The 56th Fighter-Interceptor Group was scheduled to move to the base as soon as it was completed.

5,160 acres of agricultural land was selected in the northwest corner of Kenosha County and an additional 360 acres in neighboring Racine County. Construction had barely begun in 1956 when the Air Defense Command began to doubt the selection of the site. By this time, it was named after the famous aviator Major Richard Ira Bong, a Wisconsin World War II flying ace. Colonel Charles E. Lancaster, the new commander of the command pointed out that new problems in air traffic control would develop and that the community of Lake Geneva, Wisconsin, only 18 miles west, protested violently when a site there had been proposed for the location of the United States Air Force Academy. His recommendations were to select a site north of Milwaukee where the location would be beneficial to not only the Air Defense Command, but the Strategic Air Command, which was planned to be the base tenant at the time.

Only the drainage system was being built in the middle of 1957 and the acquisition of land was not even complete. At that time, the scheduled date of the moving of the two squadrons was changed to mid-1960. On June 5, 1957, the major command for the base was changed to the Strategic Air Command. The two squadrons that were planned to be located there became tenants at the base. As technology increased, the Air Defense Command was able to reduce its aircraft and continue its strength. One of the O'Hare squadrons was eliminated in 1958 while another was transferred to K.I. Sawyer Air Force Base.

During 1956 and 1957, Strategic Air Command devised a program where the units were to be dispersed throughout the country, which in theory would lessen losses from a direct enemy attack. Bong became one of these bases. As a result, the 4040th Air Base Squadron was activated on August 1, 1958, to maintain the base. The base was also assigned to the Eighth Air Force as well. The planned tenants of the base were a bomber wing and an air refueling wing.

On January 1, 1959, responsibility for the base was transferred from the Eighth Air Force and 4040th Air Base squadron to the Second Air Force. The tenant 4040th was made up of two servicemen when this move occurred. The Air Force then realized that the units planned for the base could be accommodated at other existing bases. Since the base would no longer be needed, the Air Force announced on October 1 that Bong would be closed. At that date, the 12,900-foot (3,900 m) asphalt runway was just three days from having the concrete poured over it. That same day, all construction was halted.

The 4040th, now made up of 12 servicemen and no civilians was discontinued on December 1, 1959. The decision to close the base was due to the realization that the B-58 Hustler could be accommodated at other bases through the elimination of B-47 Stratojet units ahead of schedule. Bong Air Force Base was declared excess on August 23, 1960. Secretary of the Air Force James H. Douglas, Jr. later explained the decision to close Bong by saying:

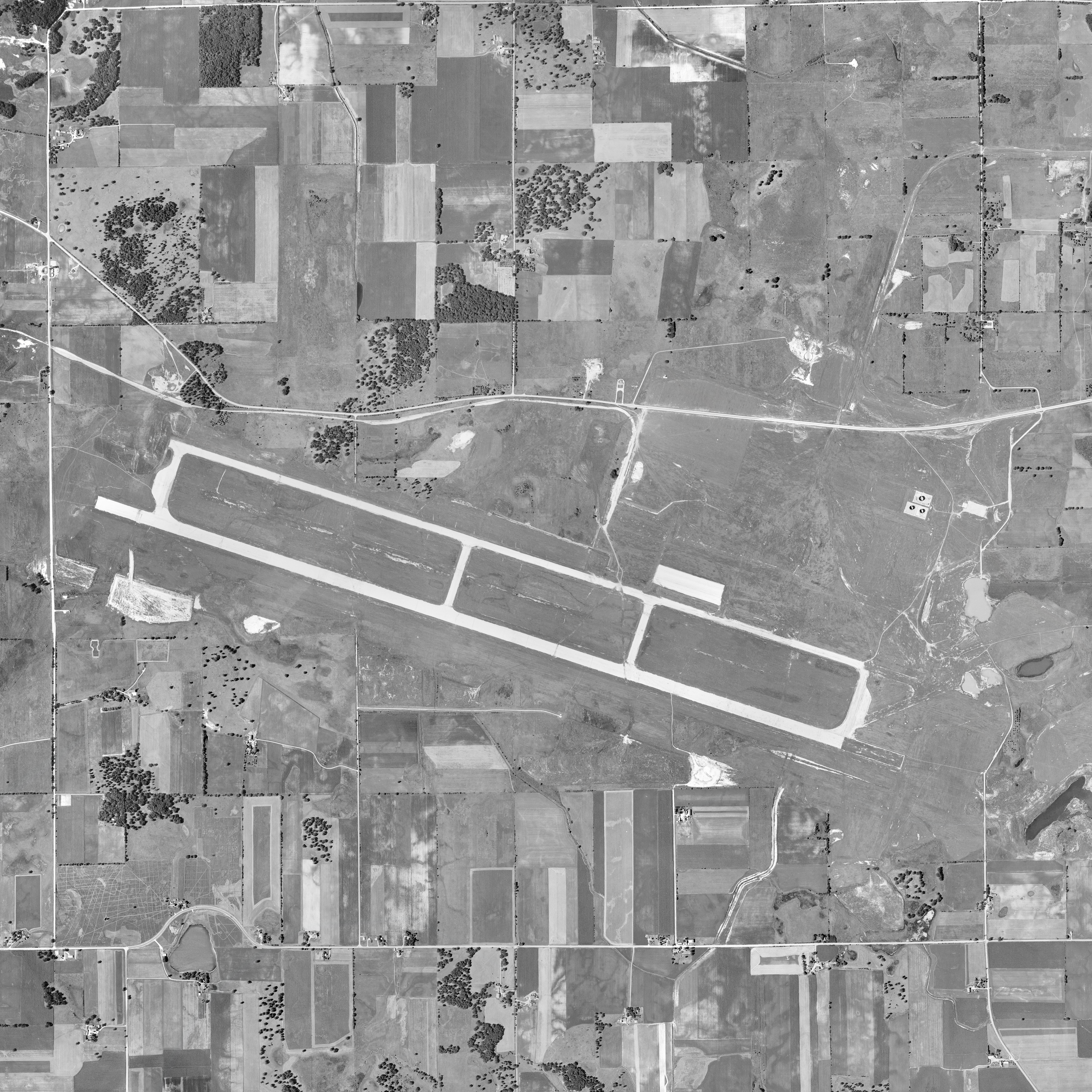
R.I. Bong Air Force Base as it sat abandoned and unfinished circa 1963

"Finally we realized that by 1961–62 when Bong would be ready, we would have several other medium bomber bases empty of squadrons & we really don't need Bong."

The only military activity that ever occurred at Bong was the training of Special Forces units before they headed over to the Vietnam War.

== Chronology of events ==
Colonel Charles E. Lancaster, base commander, is shown looking at the heating plant and POL tank farm, some of the few above ground structures built on the cancelled Bong Air Force Base. The project was cancelled a week after this photo was taken.

- February 18, 1955 – Racine Journal Times reports that the Air Force was interested in building a base in southeastern Wisconsin.
- April 20, 1955 – Congress asked to appropriate $16.5 million ($138 million adjusted for inflation as of 2017) for the base. The Air Force still refused to disclose its exact location.
- July 1, 1955 – U.S. Senate authorizes $16 million for an $83 million jet base in the Kansasville, Wisconsin area to be named in honor of Major Richard I Bong.
- September 15, 1955 – Air Force Brigadier General William Wise told 800 Dover and Brighton residents that the exact location of Bong still couldn't be pinpointed.
- February 28, 1956 – Air Force officials confirmed rumors that start of construction would be delayed because of an "inability to use the runway plan on a 24-hour basis in all kinds of weather." Farmers were told to "go ahead and plant."
- July 10, 1956 – Congress gave authorization to start purchase of land. A revised appropriation granted $30,660,000 ($302 million adjusted for inflation as of 2017) for construction.
- September 8, 1956 – Air Force revealed that except for a small portion of land in Racine County, the base would be located in the Town of Brighton, Kenosha County. Cost of land acquisition was estimated at $1.7 million State highways and utilities lines would be relocated at a cost of $2 million.
- September 12, 1956 – Air Force said the base would require 5,400 acres of land. This later was expanded to 5,500 when it was decided to extend the runway from 11,500 feet to 12,300 feet.
- November 14, 1956 – Air Force said it had authorized the U.S. Army Corps of Engineers to start buying land.
- December 12, 1956 – Property owners said they had been contacted by government representatives seeking to buy land.
- March 5. 1957 – Landowners staged third meeting, protesting the government's appraised price for property.
- March 22, 1957 – Air Force announced Bong also would be used for Strategic Air Command bombers.
- June 5, 1957 – Call for bids to build drainage ditch, first step in construction.
- June 27, 1957 – Appleton, Wis., firm received the first construction contract for off-base drainage facilities at a cost of $50,040 ($420,000 adjusted for inflation as of 2017).
- October 3, 1957 – Air Force announced further delays in awarding the first major construction contract, originally set to be awarded in August.
- November 13, 1957 – Corps of Engineers told Racine and Kenosha County highway department officials that sections of County Trunk J and Highways 43 and 75 would have to be abandoned by January 1, 1958.
- January 31, 1958 – Air Force authorized immediate advertising for runway bids.
- June 6, 1958 – Minneapolis firm S.J. Groves & Sons awarded a $13,606,998 contractor construction of the main runway and taxiways.
- June 7, 1958 – Colonel Charles E. Lancaster named commanding officer of Bong Air Force Base.
- June 25, 1958 – Allen J. McKay, vice president of S.J. Groves & Sons, reveals plans for their 120 ft x 60 ft steel shop and a 60 ft x 30 ft frame office building to constructed at the corner of Highway 43 (present-day Highway 142) and county trunk B. McKay indicated that peak work crews would number between 400 and 450 workers.
- June 18, 1958 – Construction begins. State Representative Henry Reuss asked the Senate Appropriation Committee to reject an $18.5 million item for Bong Base pending a review of the base's effect on civilian aircraft operations in the Chicago-Milwaukee area.
- July 1, 1958 – Resident Army Engineer Major General George L. Shumaker issues emergency request to shut down several town, county and state roads, including state highways 75 and 43 (present-day highway 142), county trunks B and LM, Brighton (Center) Road and Rhodes Road.
- July 25, 1958 – Bong Base survives House vote. Representative Charles A. Boyle of Illinois made a motion to strike appropriation from a military construction bill, citing the collision hazard military jets poised for commercial aviation and the need for further study of the base's impact on the air corridor.
- September 20, 1958 – Bids were opened for $2 million additional construction of roads, sewers, water system and electric substation.
- October 23, 1958 – Korndoerter & Salvano Inc. and Henry Nielsen Iron Works win contracts.
- January 4, 1959 – Representative Gerald Flynn indicates the Bong Air Force Base would be obsolete within 5 to 10 years of its construction. It would be revealed after the base's cancellation in October of that year that Flynn took part in a secret meeting in the fall of 1958 regarding the advent of the missile and how it would impact air base operations.
- March 26, 1959 – Representative Henry S. Reuss states "It is perfectly possible that the Bong Base may be obsolete only a few years after its completion. Under the circumstances, it is not too early to start thinking about what might be done with this $83 million airport when the air force does not need it any more."
- March 30, 1959 – Minneapolis firm S.J. Groves & Sons awarded contract for $7,845,434 to build hangars, refueling system, fuel tanks, access aprons and support facilities.
- April 29, 1959 – Air Force said it would open bids on May 20 on a possible $14 8 million contract for construction of 900 homes for base personnel. The next day an Air Force spokesman said bids would be accepted on 1,390 units.
- May 13, 1959 – Colonel Lancaster told a Manufacturers Association group that The Richard I Bong Air Force Base will become equivalent of Burlington in size and retail services
- May 18, 1959 – Representative Henry S. Reuss charges that Bong was a waste of the taxpayers money shot through with frills. He criticized plans for bowling alleys, hi-fi shop, steam room and squash court.
- May 23, 1959 – Representative Gerald T. Flynn of Racine denies Bong contained frills.
- June 17, 1959 – Announced plans to take bids for a 50-bed hospital at an estimated cost of $1.8 million.
- June 24, 1959 – The Five Boro Construction Co of New York was the apparent low bidder ($3,447.367) for construction of dormitories, mess hall, service club and two-story officers' quarters.
- September 26, 1959 – Air Force officials visit air base. The Burlington Standard Press is contacted by government officials requesting they process some 32 pictures taken by the seven VIPs touring the Bong Air Force Base. The photos are sent to the Pentagon and the White House.
- October 1, 1959 – The Burlington Standard Press readies a story entitled "What's Brewing at Bong Base." Colonel Lancaster,"up north" at that time, would not permit them to run that story.
- October 2, 1959 – Bong Air Force Base project cancelled. Burlington Standard Press editor Vern Wolf is present on the base when the call comes in to Lt. Colonel Stanley Wilber indicating that the base had been "shot out from under him."
- October 19, 1959 – Vice President Richard Nixon denies an allegation leveled by state Representative Gerald Flynn that he pressured the Air Force into cancelling the project.
- November 4, 1959 – Bong opponent Representative Charles A. Boyle, described as the "arch-foe" of Congressman Flynn, dies when his car strikes an "L" pillar in Chicago. "He was a familiar sight with his big limousine and eight children in and around Burlington," the town just six miles west of the Bong Air Force Base. Boyle 52 years old and driving alone at the time of death. Police theorized Boyle either fell asleep while driving or was cut off by another motorist.
- December 1, 1959 – The 12 Air Force personnel assigned to the 4040th Air base Squadron are reassigned to other Strategic Air Command bases. Colonel Charles E. Lancaster is reassigned to Clinton County Air Force Base in Ohio.
- December 2, 1959 – Colonel Charles E. Lancaster announces the base's official deactivation. Remaining officers and enlisted men are ordered to other bases by December 15 of the same year.
- January 7, 1960 – Colonel Charles E. Lancaster receives the Air Force Commendation Medal for his service as the only commander of the cancelled Bong Air Base. The citation accompanying the medal read in part, "Colonel Lancaster demonstrated outstanding leadership and professional ability in successfully accomplishing the function of his inherent responsibilities." Newspaper editorials publish positive responses citing his affability, dedication and the adversity he faced of decisions out of his control.

With $15 million ($125 million adjusted for inflation as of 2017) already spent on Bong, it was estimated that it would take another $15 million just to close the door on the episode and get out of existing contracts.

== Cancellation factors ==
=== Cost ===
On May 18, 1959, Representative Henry S. Reuss informed the House of Representatives that he felt the Bong project was "shot thru with waste, frills, and extravagance." He further went on to urge the House to "put the brakes" on "non-essential" air force expenditures at the nascent base. Among line items he assailed were a proposed massage room, squash courts, hi-fi shop, and a bowling alley. He went on to cite bong's proximity to nearby Racine and Kenosha, and the short drive to Milwaukee or Chicago in either direction. "If Bong were being built in the middle of a great desert, or atop a mountain, or in some inaccessible place far from civilized centers, these grandiose plans might be somewhat justifiable."

Secretary of the Air Force James H. Douglas told 200 members at a hearing in the Racine County Courthouse on October 8, 1959, that the costs of missiles was another fiscal reason for the cancellation of Bong. Previously, missiles had been considered a development program. At that point in history, missiles had become operational, and the costs were quickly soaring. Citing this shift in priorities, he said the reallocation of funds sprung from an "effort to do the most important things and to do the things we must militarily have." He went on to add that the Air Force didn't reach its cancellation decision sooner because of "the natural strong reluctance to turn around when we had proceeded so far."

=== Air traffic congestion ===
The same advantage to Bong's location was also a disadvantage—proximity to two urban centers. Placing the jet fighter interceptor base between Chicago and Milwaukee made the base ideal for defending the cities and the area in between, but it also meant putting more airplanes into an already busy air corridor for commercial aviation. O'Hare was considered one of the busiest airports in the world, and the idea of introducing military planes to skies already bustling with passenger planes was not widely embraced.

A contentious House debate occurred in July, 1958, when an additional $18.5 million was requested for the air base project. Representative Melvin Laird took exception with the base' location, stating "Here is an example where the Air Force bullied its way through the Civil Aeronautics Administration and went ahead and got into this construction program in a very improper location."

During that same debate, Representative Charles Boyle called placing the airfield 40 miles from O'Hare and 16 miles from Mitchell "the height of folly." He went on to say "How in the name of heaven can you go ahead and throw into a project that is obsolete before it leaves the drawing board?" Concerned with the proximity of civilian air hubs and the possibility of in-air collisions, he went on to recommend cancelling the base over a year before the consensus aligned with his view.

Private airlines expressed concern that the base would force them to reroute flights eight or ten miles out over Lake Michigan to accommodate the air base. The Air Force tried to allay concerns by indicating that intensive flying exercises would not take place at the base. Major General W. P. Fisher indicated in a letter that air base would be fully combat capable and remain on constant ready alert.

Roger Sekadlo, manager of Mitchell Field, expressed relief after the announced base cancellation saying "Now we will have no intermingling of military jet bombers and passenger planes. That is definitely a better situation for commercial airlines." Newspapers weighed in as well, with the editorial board of the Milwaukee Journal adding "Vainly did The Journal and others protest that bombers and tankers -- if a new base was needed -- ought to be "dispersed" to areas where they would not invite attack on already attractive targets and where military planes would not interfere with heavy commercial air traffic nor be interfered with.".

Representative Flynn accused then vice president Richard Nixon of having been involved with the base's closure after being pressured by private airlines. Nixon, as well as his aides, denied any involvement in the decision. Nixon told a reporter in Chicago "I know nothing whatever about this matter and I had nothing to do with it." Representative Melvin Laird would later go on to serve as President Nixon's Secretary of Defense from 1969–1973.

=== Obsolescence ===
In January 1959, Representative Gerald T. Flynn predicted that Bong would be obsolete in 5 to 10 years. He presumed the airfield would no longer be needed once ballistic missiles were more commonly employed for defense, and presumed the air base would be turned into a Milwaukee metropolitan area airport. "When the base becomes obsolete, it undoubtedly will be offered for sale as surplus government property."

Later that year in March, Representative Henry S. Reuss stated "It is perfectly possible that the Bong Base may be obsolete only a few years after its completion. Under the circumstances, it is not too early to start thinking about what might be done with this $83 million airport when the air force does not need it any more."

When the base was conceived, the Air Force had a mandate to rapidly build up its crewed operations as quickly as possible. The Air Force intended to have 137 air wings scattered throughout the United States by the year 1957. By 1959, the year in which Bong was cancelled, the Air Force had only 103 air wings.

The Bong Air Force Base was conceived in 1954 as a jet fighter interceptor base, the same year that the first ICBM was built. Rapid changes in technology changed America's strategic defense strategies. The speed with which missile advances were made created uncertainty surrounding crewed bomber operations. The Bomarc missile was making its debut, and America's first long range missiles were turned over to the Strategic Air Command at Vanderburg Air Force Base in California.

When pressed for reasons of the base closure on October 8, 1959, Secretary of the Air Force James H. Douglas opined "The facts are, if we try to simplify the problem, our highest priority weapons development -- intercontinental ballistic missile -- is the start of a chain of events that leads to a change of plans that has eliminated Bong."

=== Ideal target ===
Concern was voiced that the air base might make an already attractive enemy target even more desirable. The placement of the base meant that anything within a 600-mile radius was considered to be in a direct line of a missile launched from Russia. In March 1959, Colonel George Carnachan, metropolitan Milwaukee Target Area co-chairman for Civil Defense, indicated that the Bong Air Force Base's presence may raise the area to a #1 rating in case of an enemy nuclear strike. "There's little doubt strategic bomber base like Bong would be the first thing you'd go for if you were the enemy."

Bong's location caused Civil Defense to rethink its evacuation strategy for the cities of Kenosha, Racine and the southern part of Milwaukee County. Previously, residents in the lakeside communities were urged to head west in to Walworth County in case of enemy attack. Placing the air base between the lake and the area of refuge meant evacuees might have to drive directly through the base blast area as no alternative routes would be available.

A mock nuclear bombing raid was conducted by Civil Defense on April 17, 1959, as part of the nationwide Operation Alert. Residents of southeastern Wisconsin were informed that an imaginary one megaton bomb would explode over the Bong Air Force Base. Officials claimed that in such a scenario, the nearby city of Racine would experience little to no blast damage, but 100 to 3,000 roentgens of radioactive fallout would cover the city. They further explained that 450 roentgens was sufficient to cause severe sickness or death for those that came in contact with the fallout.

Representatives Henry S. Reuss and Charles A. Boyle had gone so far to write a joint letter to President Dwight D. Eisenhower in 1958 questioning the advisability of a Strategic Air Command bomber base placed between Milwaukee and Chicago. According to Reuss, "we urged the President to halt spending at Bong and to order a full investigation of the project."

== Missile base claim ==
Representative Gerald T. Flynn stated after a hearing on October 8, 1959, that he and Representative Henry S. Reuss had attended a secret briefing in the fall of 1958 in which "eight colonels and two generals" explained how the base's primary function would not be that of a bomber base. He alleged that once the bomber was outmoded as an instrument of nuclear weapons delivery, Bong would become a missile base. "They told us what the missile would consist of, how it would be fired, and why it was essential to have such a base in that location as a link in the midwest defense," Flynn said. He went on to offer his statement under oath to any governmental investigation committee. Flynn claimed that the Air Force planned on installing on underground facility with 20-foot deep shaft for missiles.

Secretary of the Air Force James H. Douglas brushed Flynn's comments aside at hearing by saying "I think that Mr. Flynn misunderstood the briefing, and this isn't a very difficult thing to do sometimes." He explained that the briefing in question was aimed at informing congressmen of the shift from crewed bombers to missiles in the future. "There was no definite plan to use Bong as a launching site for ballistic missiles."

Reporter Robert W. Wells of the Saturday Evening Post would later ask a Pentagon official, John M. Ferry, about the feasibility of turning Bong in to a missile base. "Missile sites are dispersed around — not necessarily on — existing Air Force bases. The personnel commute between the sites and the parent base. At Bong there wasn't yet a completed base on which missile installations could be centered. Besides, there are special problems in converting a base for missile use. The water table is important. The silo for a missile goes down 185 feet below ground."

== Abandoned airfield ==
Construction had been taking place for about a year and half when the cancellation came. Several aspects of the base were already taking form when the project was scrapped.

=== Runway ===
1,642,600 cubic yards (1,255,900 m^{3}) of aggregate base, four feet deep and tightly compacted, had already been laid for the primary runway and taxiways. The 12,900-foot (3,900 m) asphalt runway was just three days from having the concrete poured over it when the cancellation orders came. S.J. Groves and Sons had completed 71% of the air field work, in addition to 19% of the work complete on alert taxiways, hangar units and airport supports. The Assistant Secretary of Defense indicated that the primary runway cost $750,000, (about $6 million adjusted for inflation in 2017) in federal appropriations. Other costs included a $3,000,000 ($25 million adjusted for inflation in 2017) operational apron, a $1,150,000 (nearly $10 million adjusted for inflation in 2017) hangar apron, $1,500,000 (nearly $13 million adjusted for inflation in 2017) maintenance dock, $2,400,000 (about $20 million adjusted for inflation in 2017) jet fuel hydrants, and a $700,000 (about $6 million adjusted for inflation in 2017) ordnance storage. It is not clear how much of these items were completed before the base was abandoned.

=== Navigational Aid Facility ===
The air navigation aid, or TACAN, sat south of the primary runway at 42°37′20.6″N 88°9′22.7″W (42.622387, -88.156294). Information on this structure is scarce, but it is indicated on a map furbished by the GSA, on a map in the collection at the Wisconsin Historical Society, and visible in aerial photography up until 1970. The Assistant Secretary of Defense indicated that the navigational control station cost $40,000 (about $340,000 adjusted for inflation in 2017) in federal appropriations.

=== Receiver building ===
The receiver facility sat west of the primary runway at 42°37′37.7″N 88°11′14.27″W (42.627139, -88.187278). Information on this structure is scarce, but it is indicated on a map furbished by the GSA and on a map in the collection at the Wisconsin Historical Society. The facility is visible in aerial photography up until 1970, though it appears to have been stripped or partially dismantled by 1970 and the foundation destroyed or buried after 1980. The Assistant Secretary of Defense indicated that the communications receiver cost $35,000 (about $300,000 adjusted for inflation in 2017) in federal appropriations.

=== Railroad spur ===
A $600,000 ($5 million adjusted for inflation in 2017) Soo rail spur, built in 1958, rusted from disuse. It was intended to bring jet fuel and other supplies in to the base. The five-mile railroad split from the Soo line south of Burlington and entered the west end of the base until turning south east of country trunk B. From there, the single track split into three parallel rail lines for the batch plant. Although a locomotive ran the track once upon completion, the spur never saw a single payload moved on it. The line was dismantled for salvage in 1974.

=== Water distribution system ===
A water distribution system with a length of 3.75 miles of varying sizes of class 150 cast iron pipe had been put in place prior to the termination of construction – 400 ft of 6-inch, 3,500 ft of 8-inch, 14,800 ft of 12" and 1,300 ft of 18-inch pipe. Upward of 25 fire hydrants dotted the prairie landscape.

=== Sanitary sewer ===
The sanitary sewer system was incomplete, but some 13,500 feet of 8-inch to 21-inch-diameter lines had been laid.

=== Storm drainage ===
Some 29,500 feet (9,000 m) (approximately 5.5 miles in length) of storm drainage pipe had been installed through 1959. Urban explorers of the late 20th and early 21st century refer to this collection of large concrete pipes as "the tunnels". A 60-inch-diameter (5 ft) storm drainage system had been built with a 96" (8 ft) diameter storm sewer outflow to the Peterson Creek on the south of the property.

Most of the 26-inch-diameter manholes or catch basins have long since been capped, either by bulldozers using dirt in the 1960s or metal plates in the early 2000s. Depth of these manholes ranged from 5 ft to 21 feet (6.4 m). An inventory completed in 2001 indicated that upward of 120 manholes still covered the landscape, though some were only located through the use of a metal detector after being entombed in dirt.

=== Water treatment plant ===
Sewage and water treatment plants were planned for the north central area of the base. The sewage treatment plant would be two-story structure with an office and laboratory totaling some 1,800 square feet (170 m^{2}) in area. The water treatment plant was to be 6,800 square feet in area and would include a 500,000-US-gallon (1,900,000 L; 420,000 imp gal) ground storage reservoir.A 140-foot-diameter (43 m) clarification tank was submerged into the ground north of Highway 142 at 42°38′20.4″N 88°8′26.9″W (42.639000, -88.140806) and never put in to use. The tank has slowly deteriorated into a pond.

An additional million-gallon elevated steel tank would have been located on the north side of the base near residential section. The sewage and water treatment facilities were being built by the C & C Construction Company of Fort Wayne, IN and were 14% complete when the cancellation order was announced.

=== Heating plant ===
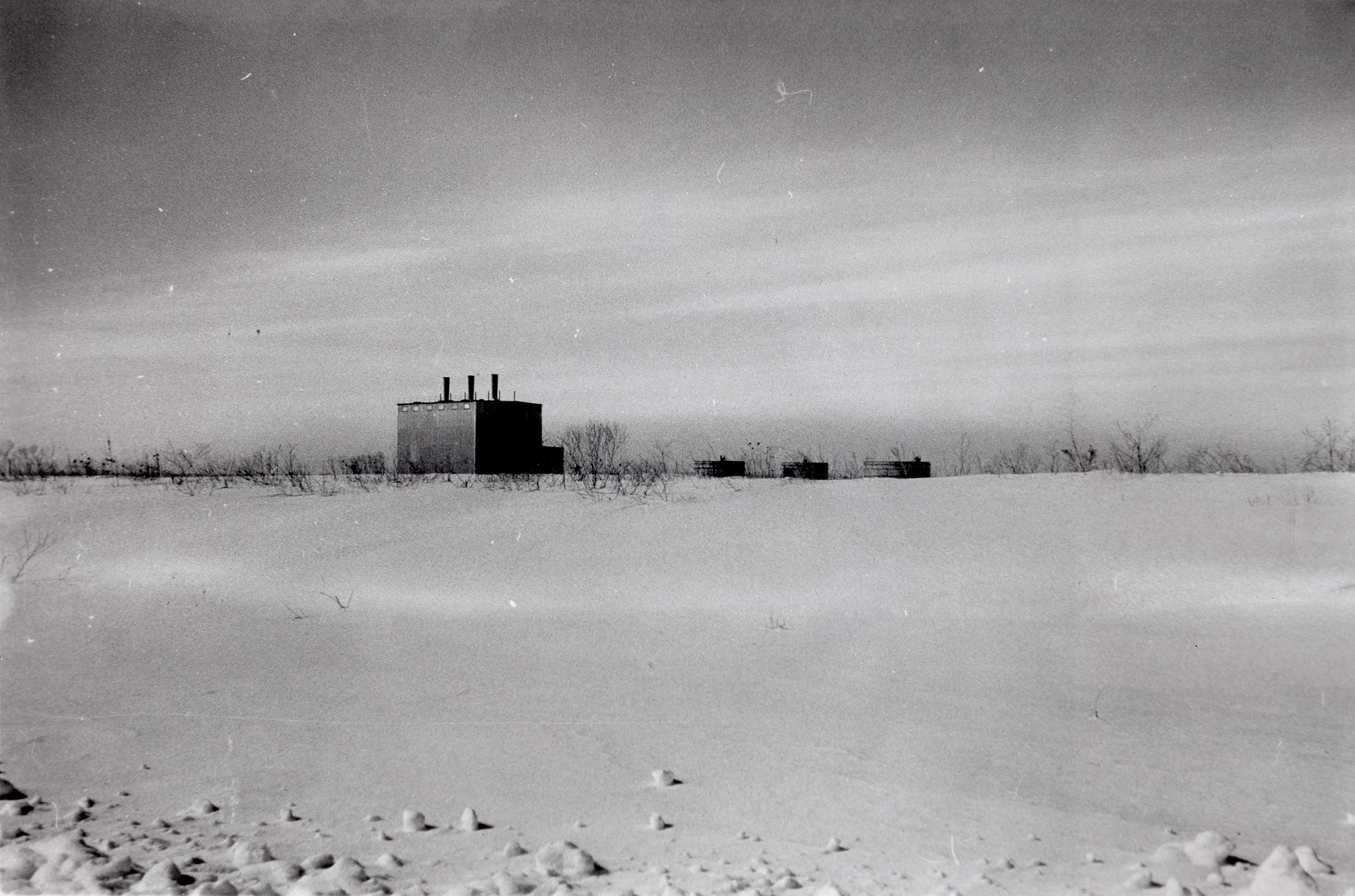
The deserted heating plant and POL storage tanks during the first winter after the base was cancelled.

A 3,500 horsepower central heating plant had been erected. The facility was built by the H.R. Reger Company of Chicago throughout 1958 and 1959. The plant was estimated to be 72% complete when the cancellation order came down. The Assistant Secretary of Defense indicated that the heating cost $250,000 (about $2 million adjusted for inflation in 2017) in federal appropriations

=== Tank farm ===
Three POL (propellant, oil and lubricants) tanks capable of holding 70,000 barrels of jet fuel and 20,000 US gallons (76,000 L; 17,000 imp gal) of gasoline sat vacant. The storage facility consisted of two 20,000 barrel tanks, one 30,000 barrel tank, and one underground 2,000 barrel tank. The H.R. Reger Company of Chicago once again won the contract and built the facility. The tank farm stood at just south of present-day Highway 142 at 42°37′55.4″N 88°8′01.9″W (42.632060, -88.133848) on a five acres of land.

The U.S. Army Corps of Engineers made an effort to lease the tanks after the closure of the base, but they were ultimately never used.

=== Electrical substation ===
An electrical switching station sat idle. The station had three 1,667 kVA oil bath transformers and two 6-amp oil circuit breakers. Input of the transformers was rated at 26.4 kVA, with an additional 10 kVA for three circuit 120/240 V.

=== Army engineer's office ===
The Keno Construction Company of Highland Park, Illinois, had erected a $100,000 (nearly $1 million adjusted for inflation as of research in 2017) corrugated office at the corner of present-day Highways 142 and 75. The 32 ft x 128 ft prefabricated Butler style building with sheet steel exterior was built during the fall of 1958. The office housed Major General Shumaker and his United States Army Corps of Engineers staff.

The engineer's office was the first building erected on the base and the last to be torn down. The structure was later turned into a school house and ultimately razed in the early 21st century, making it the only above ground air force base structure to survive the base's later conversion into a recreation area.

=== Hospital and dorms ===
The Borough Construction Company of New York had complete 10% of their work on a base hospital before the project was cancelled. Similar work on a dorm was only 3% complete. Concrete footings were poured for the dorm but later covered. Some of those foundations are still visible on the Brighton Dale Links golf course at 42°38′40.9″N 88°7′21.9″W (42.644694, -88.122750). Underground storm sewers were also installed that area.

=== Roadway disruption ===
County and state roads had been cut off by the project. Highway 43 (present-day highway 142) was severed where it ran through the base. By 1961, residents inconvenienced by the closure of highway 43 between Burlington and Kenosha eventually battered the air base gates and unofficially reopened the road.

Prior to base cancellation, Hwy 75 was intended to be re-routed as a two-lane highway north through the town of Brighton itself. After reaching Hwy 43, it would turn into a four-lane road running north. These plans were scrapped once additional lanes for air base traffic were no longer needed. Hwy 75 instead ran north from a fork just above Klondike and along the former air base's eastern boundary until reconnecting at the intersection next to Brighton Elementary.

== Impact ==
"Stunned southeastern Wisconsin residents today were accusing the Air Force of creating a 15 million dollar desert in their backyards in cancelling building of Richard Bong Air Force Base."

— Kenosha Evening News, October 3, 1959

=== Displaced people ===
The land comprising the base had once been half-covered in forest with a prairie in its center. Potawatomi, Menomonee and Ojibwa Native Americans had been known to once hunt on the land. European settlers arrived around 1830, driving out the indigenous people and altering the prairie. Arrowheads were sometimes found afterward, and a trail created by the indigenous people once ran through the property in a north–south direction to the east of the pioneer cemetery. All traces of this trail were erased by base construction, as it occupied the area cleared for the runway, taxiway, heating plant and POL area.

Rhodesdale farmstead house is moved off base in 1958

The area was first cleared by the Thomas Rhodes family in 1842. Possibly the largest of government land purchases, the family's farm Rhodesdale and 115-years-old during its final year of 1957. Brothers Frank and Clarence, fourth-generation farmers born on the homestead and lived there the entirety of their lives, were informed that they would have to vacate the homestead by November 1957. Collectively, the Rhodes family owned 10% of the land necessary for the government to build. The original farmhouse at 42°38′42.5″N 88°7′46.7″W (42.645139, -88.129648) was relocated three miles to the northeast corner of County Trunks J and BB along with one barn on March 29, 1958.

In total, 59 farm families were displaced. An incomplete list of displaced residents includes the Gruinwall, Ratlidge, Sheahan, Kirkman, Meyer, Wiener, Muller, Ward, Rhodes, Schaefer, Theobold, Vacins, Ericks, and McEtridge families. Many of their homes were razed during construction. Farmers were paid $220 to $300 an acre ($1,952.06 to $2,661.90, adjusted for inflation in November 2017). Farmers felt the government was not giving them a fair price for their land. Some tried protesting, asking nearby residents for help or using litigation to halt the process. Others tried to relocate to land nearby, only to find that prices had skyrocketed on the heels of real estate developers and speculators. Most families sold then moved off of the land. About a dozen families refused to accept the prices offered to them and moved off under condemnation proceedings. Adding to their losses, the displaced farmers were unable to put in their 1957 crops, and were too late to put in new crops on other at other locations.

For a variety of reasons, the families were unable to return to their property following the base's cancellation, and the land was deemed as governmental surplus. 14 million cubic yards of rich farming soil was stripped away by the air base project, making 2,000 acres of prime agricultural land useless for farming after the cancellation of the air base.

=== Lost cemetery ===
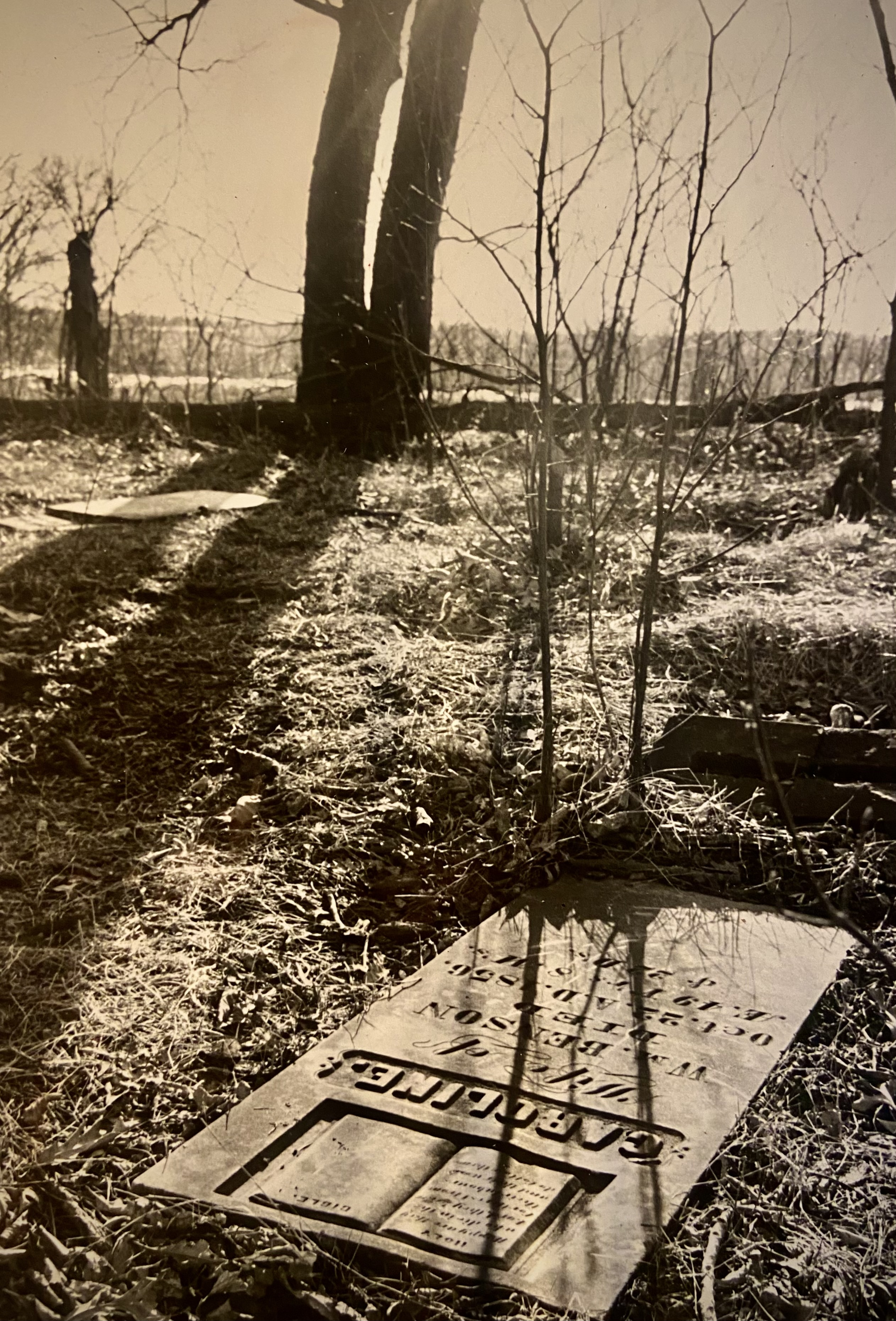
A tombstone from Brighton's "lost cemetery."

A 1/4-acre pioneer cemetery on the 40 acre Gill farm dating back to 1887 was reinterred in June 1958 by Earl Spencer. Officials expected to move eight marked graves and possible additional unmarked graves. Lois Stein conducted the research of the graveyard.

Nine graves were marked, though a total of 22 bodies would be moved. W. Eddy, Patrick Patterson and one additional body were transferred to Salem Mound Cemetery in Silver Lake. Nineteen other decedents were moved to the Forest Home cemetery in Milwaukee, including Walter Reynolds, Suky Reynolds, Caroline Benson, Jane C. Benson and Roby Sheldon. All identifiable graves dated back to the mid-19th century.

The cemetery sat off of the southeast corner of former County Trunk LM and Brighton Road at 42°37′32.5″N 88°8′56.3″W (42.625686, -88.148983), between the runway and taxiway just south of the operational apron. The abandoned air base's runway 8 ft diameter storm sewer presently runs through the site of the cemetery.

=== Relocated pioneer cabin ===
A log cabin built in 1845 by Matt Wallrich was discovered when bulldozers came to raze structures for the runway. The cabin was hidden inside of 20th-century cladding. It was dismantled piece by piece and reassembled by Seabee Unit 9-46 and the Kenosha Historical Society and moved to a park in nearby Silver Lake. The years were not kind to the structure. Vandals, fire and rot eventually deteriorated the cabin to the point that it had to be torn down 35 years after it was saved. Some of the timbers and the plaque were moved back to Brighton and placed near the ball diamond at Wack Park. Today the plaque is attached to a stone, the old wooden timbers long since having rotted away.

=== Topographical alteration ===
"When we fought Japan and Germany and devastated their areas, we went in with American dollars and rehabilitated them. They have devastated us as much as if they had bombed us."..." –

— Rep Gerald T. Flynn (D-Wis)

Trees in the southwest corner of the tract were removed using a slash-and-burn method. Stumps, rocks, concrete rubble and demolished building debris were deposited into dumping grounds in the same area. Topsoil was skimmed from the areas containing the runway apron, central heating pant and POL tank farm and stockpiled in the northwest corner of the base. The southern half of the site had essentially been flattened to create an even grade for the runway. According to a report prepared by the Wisconsin Department of Natural Resources in 1978, stating "Returning this land to agriculture was considered impossible as the topsoil had been stripped."

The majority of the former roads passing through the site were never restored, and it would take years to reopen Highway 43 (present-day Highway 142). Locals became fed up with Highway 43's closure, as it was the quickest route between the towns of Kenosha and Burlington. Someone eventually rammed open the gates erected by Army Corps of Engineers, and motorists ignored the "US Government – Keep off" signs. Prior to base cancellation, Highway 75 was intended to be re-routed as a two-lane highway north through the town of Brighton itself. After reaching Hwy 43 (present-day Highway 142), it would turn into a four-lane road running north. These plans were scrapped once additional lanes for air base traffic were no longer needed. Highway 75 would not be restored until four years after the air base was cancelled. Even then, it would not run its old route. The new Highway 75 now split off the old highway at Klondike and run north along the eastern edge of the site until it reconnected to the old highway at Brighton Elementary.

=== Economic disruption ===
Map showing the proposed location for the never-built Upland community and re-routing of Hwy 75

$29,000,000 (a quarter of a billion dollars adjusted for inflation in 2017) had already been spent on the base when construction was halted; 59 farm families had been displaced. The town of Brighton lost 23% of its tax valuation, and the school district lost 27% of its tax base. Several entrepreneurs were attracted to the area around the base eager to capitalize on air base-related commerce. Motels were built, including one outside of Union Grove, Wisconsin, simply called "Bong Motel".

The base was to include 900 Capehart housing units built to house military personnel and dependents. Officials expected that additional housing would be necessary by 1962, requiring an estimated 490 housing units built to handle the overflow. Private interests were eager to capitalize on the construction boom.

An 1,800-acre property development named "Upland" was in the works. The community was to be built between Kansasville and Union Grove. The Evanston, Illinois, developers planned for 3,000 privately owned houses, 300 rental houses, 192 apartment units, a 33-store shopping center, a 92-unit motel, a golf course, parks, two elementary schools, a high school and churches. The base cancellation came the day before Scope Associates, Inc. had intended to start buying land. Had it been completed, the new city was projected to have a population of 12,000 to 15,000 residents and cost $55,000,000 (nearly half a billion dollars adjusted for inflation as of 2017).

A drive-in was erected by Ted Kostro. The Milwaukee house painter borrowed heavily and sold his house to build "the Bow and Arrow" on the approach road to the base. The base cancellation was announced on the day of the drive-in's grand opening.

=== Distrust of the federal government ===
The acquisition, modification and subsequent abandonment of eight square miles of private land reshaped the public's perception of government agencies, especially among southeastern Wisconsinites. Shock and incredulity swept over the region in reaction to the base's sudden cancellation. "I think it is rather tragic that the government should spend so much money for no good purpose," said Edward J. Ruetz, president of the Kenosha National bank. Congressional investigation was demanded. Local politicians railed against the government's decisions, from the closure itself to a lack of foresight beforehand. Representative Henry S. Reusscharged "From the beginning, a rank amateur would have been hard-pressed to select a more incongruous location for a strategic bomber base -- in the middle of the most congested air traffic corridors in the nation, and in the heart of an already vital target area for any enemy."

Compounding matters, the Air Force refused to finish air base construction projects like the completion of roads, utilities and the power plant. Were these items completed, the property would have more appeal to private investors with an eye on salvaging the base for industrial or commercial friendly proposals. Residents took offense to the government's willingness to spend money prior to the cancellation and its refusal to spend "one thin dime" to make the site attractive to prospective buyers. As a result, locals were more than eager to "get the federal government out of the picture." Residents of Wisconsin would be reminded of the government's mishandling of the project for the next two decades as numerous plans for the abandoned base were considered and red tape barred a swift resolution.

The distrust of the federal government would later be transferred to the Wisconsin Department of Natural Resources, the state agency that acquired 5,190 acres of the former air base over a decade of legal wrangling. In 1978, Brighton town chairman Lawrence Olsen gave voice to this animosity at a public hearing held at Westosha Central High School regarding the DNR's plan for the area. "This has always been a town of Brighton problem. Why weren't we involved in the planning? Why weren't the planning meetings held in Brighton?" He went on to charge that officials had "no consideration of those who lost the most." The DNR had not yet acquired a remaining 480 acres of school forest land under a managing agreement. Olsen pointed out how the town stood to lose yet another $12,000 a year in Brighton's tax base. Olsen was hardly alone in his disposition. Frances Jaeschke, representing the League of Women Voters, described the abandoned air base as "one of the worst fiascos of government bungling." John Vanderwerff, Brighton supervisor, opposed additional land acquisition saying "How will the town of Brighton survive? The truth is the DNR doesn't give a damn about the town of Brighton."

== Post closure activity ==
=== Surplus ===
Efforts were made to lease, salvage or sell as surplus the parts and facilities left over from the base.

H. Turner and Son Boscobel had 14,600 lineal feet of 6-inch cement pipe, 700 linear feet of concrete pipe, 95 frames and grates for manholes, and 14 cast-iron tees and crosses left sitting on the abandoned base.

C & C Construction left over 10,000 feet of 6-inch and 10-inch insulated pipe, a 325 GPM water softener, sewage plant equipment, 72-ton reinforcing steel and miscellaneous other items on the base.

The U.S Army Corps of Engineers made an effort to sell 16,372 feet of 3" electrical fibre duct and fittings, 34,0000 pounds of number 4, 5, 6 and 8 reinforcing bars, miscellaneous fabricated cages, forms, metal grates and manhole covers, 1,420 ft of 8 inch diameter Helcor pipe, miscellaneous concrete paving supplies, miscellaneous airport paving forms, 2,400 liner feet of corrugated metal pipe of 6 inch and 36 inch diameters, 700 linear feet of corrugated metal pipe of 12 inch and 15 inch diameters, 15,200 linear feet of black seamless coated pipe of 2 inch and 10 inch diameters, miscellaneous fittings for black seamless coated pipe, and eight 50,000 gallon steel tanks.

Several attempts were made to repurpose the air base, including use as a commercial park and consideration as a civilian airport. Above ground structures such as the heating plant and POL tank farm were eventually torn down. The railroad spur was declared a total loss and removed in 1974 once it was clear no industrial park would be placed on the grounds. The majority of the land sat dormant until its designation as a state park in 1974.

=== Airdrop exercises ===
The military occasionally used the abandoned airfield for exercises.

One such exercise took place on July 1, 1961, when the 82nd Airborne conducted airdrop practice maneuvers. 240 soldiers from Company C of the 1st Airborne Battle Group, 503 Infantry, parachuted into Bong as 25,000 spectators watched. Six C-119 Flying Boxcars flew in at an altitude of 2,300 feet dropping 20 men per pass. Each plane made two passes with troops. Winds were gusting at 20 mph, causing some of the paratroopers to drift in to the wooded area in the north part of the base. Three minor injuries were reported. The C119s followed the troop drop by delivering two jeeps and a 105mm howitzer from the air. A helicopter carrying seven skydivers from the 82nd Airborne was unable to climb to 7,200 feet for a planned delayed opening jump.

The Green Berets conducted a mass paratrooper jump exercise over Bong on March 16, 1968. 190 paratroops from the US Army Reserve's 12 Special Forces group joined members of the Air Force Reserve's 928th Tactical Airlift group in a simulated combat airdrop. The troops flew once again on C-119 Flying Boxcars out of O'Hare International Airport. No one was hurt during this jump.

Another exercise took place on August 3, 1968. The 440th Tactical Airlift Wing flew out of General Mitchell Field in Milwaukee on a corridor mission. The C-119 Flying Boxcar was to drop jeeps along with 55-gallon drum of water to simulate fuel. High winds led to a cancellation of the mission.

=== Biernat slaying ===
The base sat in disuse for many years following the cancellation of the project.

Four years after the base was cancelled, Kenosha business man Anthony J. Biernat's body was discovered on the north side of the abandoned base following a gangland killing. Biernat, a jukebox distributor, was said to have been beaten to death after a Chicago syndicate ordered the mob in Milwaukee to muscle in on his Great Lakes Naval Base revenue and Wisconsin jukebox operations.

A mob source is said to have called the police with a tip, stating "If you want to find Biernat's body, look in the basement of an empty house in an abandoned area in Kenosha County." When pressed for the specifics, the informant said "Well, you can be sure of one thing, it (the body) ain't going to fly away." This led local authorities and the FBI to Bong. Deputy Bob Cantwell spotted a bloody handprint on a board over a cellar entrance of the former Rutledge residence. Two hours of digging with trenching tools would reveal Biernat's body, hands tied together with a white, plastic wire.

== Transfer of land ==
=== Alternate usage ===
Several ideas were proposed to salvage the work already completed on Bong. These included an international jet airport, an industrial center, a planned community, a prison, a national cemetery, and use by NASA.

=== Park land and forest preserve ===
Nearly 1,000 acres (400 ha) of the site were transferred to the Kenosha County park commission and four local school districts. 360 acres in the northeastern corner were handed over to the county parks. Below that, 160 acres were transferred to Salem central High District, and 24 acres were deeded to Brighton Elementary School District No. 1 at the corner of present-day Highways 142 and 75. The very southwestern 120 acres of the base was turned over to the Kenosha Unified School District No. 1 School Forest. The western 320 acres of the base lying in Racine County were deeded to the Burlington Are Join District and Wilmot Union High School, respectively.

=== School ===
The $100,000 (nearly $1 million adjusted for inflation as of research in 2017) corrugated Army Engineer's office at the corner of Highway 142 and 75 was bought by the Brighton Joint School District for $1. It opened as Brighton School No. 1 and held classes starting on September 6, 1960, with 124 students in four classrooms. An entirely separate building would later be built to house classrooms along with a gymnasium in 1975. The former air force base structure, know simply as the "metal building" to residents, would later serve as the school's cafeteria and town hall office until it was demolished in the 2000s during renovations to the main school building.

=== Golf course ===
The northeastern portion of the base was turned into Brighton Dale Links, a golf course. Prior to Air Force activity, this 360-acre tract was home to the Evans, Hulett, Dixon Wagner and Rhodes families. The Air Force intended to turn this section into airmen's dorms, dining hall, service club, officer's open mess, Bachelor Officer Quarters and a multi-story 50-bed hospital. Relatively little construction activity occurred in this area prior to the base's cancellation.

The course opened on July 1, 1972, as three nine-hole courses: the Red, north and west of the clubhouse, the White, to the south and east, and the Blue, to the south and west. It is presently a 45-hole course.

=== Bong Corporation ===
Governor Knowles unveils the sign marking the site of what would become the Bong Memorial Recreation Area

The abandoned base was turned over to the General Services Administration (GSA) in 1959. In the same year, the Wisconsin legislature created the Wisconsin Federal Surplus Property Development Commission, later known as the Bong Commission, to find a use for the affected area and guide disposal of the property. Three people were appointed by Governor Gaylord Nelson to the group—George Schlitz from nearby Wheatland, Wheatland town chairman and former chairman of the Kenosha County board; William Beyer of Racine, chairman of the Racine County board; and Professor Jacob Beuscher of Madison, from the University of Wisconsin School of Law. That commission subsequently set up a dummy corporation, the Wisconsin federal Surplus Property Development Commission, later known as the Bong Corporation.

The Bong Corporation had the sole purpose of aiding the Conservation Department (the Wisconsin Department of Natural Resources would not be established until 1966) in converting the remaining 4,515 acres (1,827 ha) of the site into a recreation complex. This was to be accomplished through the issue of bonds.

A 960-acre (390 ha) parcel was purchased from the GSA using money provided by Herro and Associates. In return, Herro and Associates granted a 10-year lease with an option to buy 960 acres at cost and a trust securing the corporation's bonds. Herro and Associates intended to convert the abandoned air base into an industrial park. The same firm had first rights acquiring 1,591 acres of adjacent land to the west for a new urban development making use of the former runway and taxiway. This deal would later put the Bong Corporation in direct conflict with contracts extended to the private interest.

The Wisconsin legislature enacted Chapter 646, Laws of 1965, in order to remove the air base property from the jurisdiction of the Bong Commission. This move nullified all contracts signed by the Bong Commission. This also resulted in the 960-acre parcel being transferred to the Conservation Department, setting off litigation between Herro and Associates and the Bong Corporation. The case wound up in the Wisconsin Supreme Court, which ruled that contracts entered in to between Herro and the Bong Corporation could not be nullified. In that same ruling, the court pointed out that the state had the power of condemnation, so long as Herro and Associates were justly compensated.

The Conservation Department's successor, the Wisconsin Department of Natural Resources, initiated condemnation proceedings in 1973, resulting in monies awarded to Herro and Associates in the Circuit Court of Kenosha County. Herro was to receive $293,000 for the 960-acre parcel, and $15,851 for the rights to the 1,584 parcel. Herro appealed this ruling to the Wisconsin Supreme Court and filed a $1.4 million claim. The court upheld the lower court's decision, and the title for the land was turned over to the Wisconsin DNR.

The Wisconsin Department of Natural Resources went on to acquire 1,971 acres of land intended by the federal government for wildlife conservation. The GSA stipulated in the deed that the parcel would be "continuously used only for the conservation of wildlife". If the department failed to meet those requirements, the land would be returned to the federal government.

== Richard Bong Recreation Area ==
White Xs mark both ends of the never-completed runway to warn pilots that the 12,500-foot strip is closed.

After becoming the hotspot for biker gangs and criminal activity, the state of Wisconsin finally bought the 4,515-acre (18.27 km^{2}) site in 1974. It was then turned into a park, called Richard Bong State Recreation Area. It was the state's first recreation area.

A lake was created on the east end of the property by damming an old irrigation ditch that passed under the former Brighton Road on its way to Highway 75. Both of these features are still recognizable under water from the air. The two large holes that went on to create the lake are remnants from the air base construction as workers tried to reach bedrock in order to support a refueling station.

The remains of the asphalt runway are now used for model and remote-control aircraft flights; there are also scheduled events for model rocketry and hang gliding.

== Geography ==
Bong AFB is located at 42°38′14.62″N 88°8′56.81″W (42.637394, -88.149114), at an elevation of 810 feet (246 m) above sea level.

The air base was to occupy 5,160 acres, or 8.063-square-miles (20.88 km^{2}). The subsequent recreation area has a total area of 7.055-square-mile (18.27 km^{2}).
