= Wisconsin Highway 20 =

Highway in Wisconsin

State Trunk Highway 20
- WIS 20 highlighted in red

Route information
- Maintained by WisDOT
- Length: 42.95 mi (69.12 km)

Major junctions
- West end: US 12 / WIS 67 east of LaGrange
- I-43 in East Troy; US 45 in Union Grove; I-41 / I-94 / US 41 in Mt. Pleasant
- East end: WIS 32 / LMCT in Racine

Location
- Country: United States
- State: Wisconsin
- Counties: Walworth, Racine

Highway system
- Wisconsin State Trunk Highway System; Interstate; US; State; Scenic; Rustic
← WIS 19	→ WIS 21

State Trunk Highway 20 (often called Highway 20, STH-20 or WIS 20) is a 42.95-mile (69.12 km) state highway in Walworth and Racine counties in southeastern Wisconsin, United States. The route is a short connector that bridges the city of Whitewater and points west via U.S. Highway 12 (US 12) with East Troy, Waterford and Racine. WIS 20 is a two-lane surface road with various four-lane roads within cities.

== Route description ==
WIS 20 begins at the junction of US 12 and WIS 67 and proceeds east, going south around a junction with County Trunk Highway J (CTH-J) 1 1/2 miles (2.4 km) east of the terminus and bypassing the small community of Troy Center. WIS 20 connects with Interstate 43 (I-43) in East Troy, then meanders eastward into Racine County WIS 20 provides indirect access to Alpine Valley Music Theater which is south of the village just off WIS 120 WIS 20 merges with WIS 83 east on the west side of Waterford and both highways turn southeast into the village. WIS 83 splits to the south at WIS 20's junction with WIS 36 in Rochester. From here, WIS 20 turns east again, where it becomes Washington Avenue. WIS 20 connects with WIS 75 and crosses US 45 in the town of Yorkville.

WIS 20 has an interchange with I-94 and US 41 in Ives Grove. and enters Mount Pleasant upon crossing the Interstate, following Washington Avenue. WIS 20 crosses WIS 31 while in Mount Pleasant, then enters converges with WIS 32 just southwest of downtown Racine. The two routes follow Washington Avenue northeast and turn east onto the one-way 7th Street. WIS 20 completes a loop to turn around onto westbound one-way 6th Street as WIS 32 turns north onto Main Street in downtown Racine. These intersections form the eastern terminus of WIS 20.

== History ==
The section between Rochester and Racine existed since the dawn of the Wisconsin highway system in 1917. WIS 20 was routed southwest along WIS 36 to Burlington, then west from there along present day WIS 11, not including the Janesville or Monroe bypasses. The route also passed through Gratiot, Delavan, and Elkhorn. The western terminus at the time was at the Illinois border at East Dubuque. The route was scaled back to end at Rochester in 1934 when US 14 replaced WIS 11's original alignment. This was also done to avoid a possible conflict with U.S. Route 20 running parallel in Illinois. The western segment from La Grange to Rochester was added in 1947.

== Major intersections ==
County	Location	mi	km	Destinations	Notes
Walworth	Town of La Grange	0.00	0.00	US 12 / WIS 67 – Eagle, Oconomowoc, Whitewater, Madison, Elkhorn, Lake Geneva	Western terminus; US 12 heads west and south from junction, WIS 67 heads north and west
Walworth	Adams	1.50	2.41	CTH-J east – Troy Center, Mukwonago	
Walworth	Town of Troy	6.36	10.24	CTH-N north – Troy Center	
Walworth	East Troy	9.39	15.11	I-43 – Mukwonago, Milwaukee, Elkhorn, Delavan, Beloit	Exit 38 on I-43
Walworth	East Troy	9.63	15.50	CTH-L – East Troy Municipal Airport	
Racine	Waterford	17.67	28.44	WIS 83 north – Mukwonago, Genesee Depot	Western end of WIS 83 concurrency
Racine	Town of Rochester	19.77	31.82	WIS 36 north – Waterford, Milwaukee WIS 83 south – Rochester, Burlington	Eastern end of WIS 83 concurrency
Racine	Beaumont	25.17	40.51	CTH-S north (North Beaumont Avenue) WIS 75 south – Kansasville, Paddock Lake	
Racine	Dover–Yorkville town line	27.25	43.85	US 45 north – Milwaukee	Western end of US 45 concurrency
Racine	Town of Yorkville	28.25	45.46	US 45 south – Union Grove	Eastern end of US 45 concurrency
Racine	Ives Grove	32.74	52.69	CTH-C (Spring Street) – Mount Pleasant	
Racine	Ives Grove–Mount Pleasant line	33.44	53.82	I-41 / I-94 / US 41 – Milwaukee, Chicago	Exit 333 on I-94
Racine	Mount Pleasant	34.50	55.52	CTH-V – Caledonia	
Racine	Mount Pleasant	39.00	62.76	WIS 31 – Caledonia, Kenosha, Pleasant Prairie	
Racine	Racine	42.95	69.12	WIS 32 / LMCT (Main Street) – Caledonia, Milwaukee, Kenosha, Pleasant Prairie	Eastern terminus; eastern end of WIS 20 runs concurrent with WIS 32 for just under a mile
1.000 mi = 1.609 km; 1.000 km = 0.621 mi: Concurrency terminus
