= Klondike, Wisconsin =

There are several places in the US state of Wisconsin named Klondike:

- Klondike, Kenosha County, Wisconsin, an unincorporated community
- Klondike, Oconto County, Wisconsin, an unincorporated community
