= Brighton, Wisconsin =

Brighton is the name of some places in the U.S. state of Wisconsin:

- Brighton, Kenosha County, Wisconsin, a town
- Brighton (community), Kenosha County, Wisconsin, an unincorporated community
- Brighton, Marathon County, Wisconsin, a town
