= Wisconsin Highway 83 =

State highway in Wisconsin, United States

State Trunk Highway 83
- WIS 83 highlighted in red

Route information
- Maintained by WisDOT
- Length: 74.52 mi (119.93 km)

Major junctions
- South end: IL 83 in Paddock Lake
- I-43 in Mukwonago; US 18 in Wales; I-94 in Delafield
- North end: WIS 60 in Hartford

Location
- Country: United States
- State: Wisconsin
- Counties: Kenosha, Racine, Walworth, Waukesha, Washington

Highway system
- Wisconsin State Trunk Highway System; Interstate; US; State; Scenic; Rustic
← WIS 82	→ WIS 84

State Trunk Highway 83 (often called Highway 83, STH-83 or WIS 83) is a state highway in the U.S. state of Wisconsin. It runs north–south in southeast Wisconsin from Hartford to the Illinois border in the village of Salem Lakes.

Most of the WIS 83 corridor consists of glacial formations and lakes. From the Washington County line south to the Illinois state line, WIS 83 runs within a few miles of at least 11 different small lakes. The rural nature of this routing results in WIS 83 being mostly two-lane undivided highway except for sections where it runs concurrently with other highways (WIS 50 and WIS 36), or where it approaches an Interstate.

== Route description ==
WIS 83 begins at the Wisconsin–Illinois state line, just north of Antioch, Illinois, at the northern terminus of Illinois Route 83 (IL 83). WIS 83 heads north through Salem through the Westosha region of Kenosha County as Antioch Road. On the western edge of Paddock Lake, WIS 83 turns left on 75th Street and runs concurrently with WIS 50. WIS 75 continues north on 256th Avenue towards Kansasville. Outside of the town of Wheatland, WIS 83 turns northwest from WIS 50, crossing into Racine County and then heading into the city of Burlington as South Pine Street.

WIS 83 runs along the new Burlington Bypass around the east side of the city, with an interchange at WIS 142, an at-grade four-way stoplight at WIS 11, another interchange at County Trunk Highway A (CTH-A), and finally an on/off ramp at WIS 36 (North Milwaukee Avenue) northeast of Browns Lake. The entire length of the eastern portion of the bypass will be signed as WIS 83 until the western section is completed sometime around the fall of 2010.

WIS 83 and WIS 36 continue northeast on North Milwaukee Avenue to the intersection with WIS 20 (Beck Drive) outside of the city of Waterford. WIS 83 turns northwest onto Beck Drive, running concurrently with WIS 20 through Waterford. Upon reaching the city limits, Beck Drive becomes South 1st Street in Waterford, ending at East Main Street.

At the corner of East Main and South 1st, WIS 83/WIS 20 turns west across the Fox River onto West Main Street, heading northwest and out of the city of Waterford. On the western edge of the city, WIS 83 turns towards the northwest while WIS 20 continues due west as High Drive. WIS 83 continues towards the northwest, briefly crossing into Walworth County for less than a mile before heading into Waukesha County and the Village of Mukwonago. On the southeast side of Mukwonago, WIS 83 crosses I-43 at exit number 43.

WIS 83 runs through the village of Mukwonago as Rochester Street, winding under a railway trestle and through to its odd-angle downtown intersection with CTH-ES (Main Street/Fox Street). WIS 83 continues north towards the unincorporated communities of Genesee and Genesee Depot. Between the two towns, WIS 83 crosses WIS 59, turning to the west for about three blocks and crossing the railroad track that give the latter town its name. At the west end of Genesee Depot, WIS 83 abruptly turns to the north towards Wales. Continuing west on Depot Road leads to Ten Chimneys National Historic Landmark, the former home of Alfred Lunt and Lynn Fontanne.

WIS 83 heads north through the Kettle Moraine area of western Waukesha County, crossing US 18 on the northwest side of Wales. Entering the town of Delafield, WIS 83 crosses I-94 at exit 287. Continuing north, WIS 83 passes Naga-Waukee County Park and Golf Course towards Hartland. After crossing over the WIS 16 freeway in Hartland (exit 181), WIS 83 turns immediately west on Church Street, running parallel to the WIS 16 freeway for about a half-mile through the village of Chenequa. Heading north between Pine Lake and Beaver Lake into the community of Merton, WIS 83 crosses into Washington County.

Continuing north, WIS 83 meets the western terminus of WIS 167 at Holy Hill Road. WIS 83 continues to the north into Hartford, entering the city on Grand Avenue. At the intersection of Grand Avenue and Branch Street, WIS 83 turns to the northwest on Branch into downtown Hartford, becoming South Main Street one block south of WIS 60 (East Sumner Street), where it currently ends as of 2021.

== History ==
The original signing of WIS 83 in 1919 was along the general routing of the current WIS 83 between WIS 36 in Waterford and WIS 59 in Genesee. The route was expanded to its current termini by 1924 and has remained in the same location up until 2021 when the route was truncated at WIS 60 in Hartford.

The Burlington Bypass was first proposed in the 1990s around the south of the city. It was completed in 2010 at a cost of $118 million. The route was built out as a four lane roadway, as a result of a major overestimate in the amount of projected traffic. For this reason, it was included in WisPIRGs list of highway boondoggles.

== Major intersections ==
County	Location	mi	km	Destinations	Notes
Kenosha	Trevor	0.00	0.00	IL 83 south (Main Street) – Antioch	Continuation into Illinois
Kenosha	Paddock Lake			WIS 50 east / WIS 75 north – Kenosha	Eastern end of WIS 50 concurrency
Kenosha	New Munster			WIS 50 west – Lake Geneva	Western end of WIS 50 overlap
Racine	Burlington			WIS 11 west / WIS 36 west (Burlington Bypass)	Western end of WIS 11 and WIS 36 concurrencies
Racine	Town of Burlington			WIS 142 (Bushnell Road) – Burlington	Partial cloverleaf interchange
Racine	Town of Burlington			WIS 11 east / CTH-E – Burlington, Racine	Eastern end of WIS 11 concurrency
Racine	Town of Burlington			CTH-A (Plank Road)	Interchange
Racine	Rochester			Milwaukee Avenue – Burlington	No northbound exit
Racine	Rochester			WIS 20 east (Beck Drive) / WIS 36 east (Milwaukee Avenue) – Milwaukee, Racine	Eastern end of WIS 20 and WIS 36 concurrencies
Racine	Rochester			WIS 20 west (High Drive)	Western end of WIS 20 concurrency
Walworth	Waterford			CTH-L / Alt. I-43 south	
Waukesha	Mukwonago			I-43 – Milwaukee, Beloit	I-43 exit 43
Waukesha	Mukwonago			Alt. I-43 north / Alt. WIS 83 north / Bay View Road / Holtz Parkway	Access to Mukwonago Park & Ride / Transit Route 906
Waukesha	Mukwonago			Alt. WIS 83 south / CTH-NN / CTH-ES east	
Waukesha	Genesee			WIS 59 (Genesee Road) – North Prairie, Waukesha	Roundabout
Waukesha	Wales			US 18 (Summit Avenue) / Temp. US 18 east begins	Roundabout; southern end of Temporary US 18 concurrency
Waukesha	Delafield			I-94 – Milwaukee, Madison	Northern end of Temporary US 18 concurrency
Waukesha	Hartland			WIS 16 – Oconomowoc, Milwaukee	
Waukesha	Chenequa			Kettle Moraine Scenic Drive south / CTH-K	Southern end of Kettle Moraine Scenie Drive concurrency
Waukesha	North Lake			Kettle Moraine Scenic Drive north / CTH-VV	Northern end of Kettle Moraine Scenic Drive concurrency
Washington	Thompson			WIS 167 east (Holy Hill Road) / CTH-O west – Holy Hill	
Washington	Hartford	74.52	119.93	WIS 60 (Sumner Street)	Northern terminus
1.000 mi = 1.609 km; 1.000 km = 0.621 mi: Closed/former; Concurrency terminus; Incomplete access
