= Wisconsin Highway 142 =

Highway in Wisconsin

State Trunk Highway 142
- WIS 142 highlighted in red

Route information
- Maintained by WisDOT
- Length: 17.69 mi (28.47 km)

Major junctions
- West end: WIS 11 / WIS 36 / WIS 83 at Burlington
- US 45 in Paris
- East end: I-41 / I-94 / US 41 in Kenosha

Location
- Country: United States
- State: Wisconsin
- Counties: Racine, Kenosha

Highway system
- Wisconsin State Trunk Highway System; Interstate; US; State; Scenic; Rustic
← US 141	→ WIS 143

State Trunk Highway 142 (STH-142, commonly known as Highway 142 or WIS 142) is a mostly rural highway connecting Burlington with Kenosha.

Prior to the commissioning of Interstate 43 in the early 1970s, the current route of WIS 142 was designated as State Trunk Highway 43 (WIS 43). The route number was changed in accordance to then-Wisconsin Department of Transportation policy, which prohibits duplicate numbers between state and US/Interstate highways within Wisconsin.

When the road was recently rebuilt, the state department of transportation incorporated a new feature they are testing called centerline rumble strips.

The highway's eastern terminus with Interstate 94 has been called "Wisconsin's most visible cheese interchange" by the Milwaukee Journal Sentinel. The intersection had three cheese shops until 2009 and still has two; the oldest, Mars Cheese Castle, has been at the intersection since 1947.

== History ==
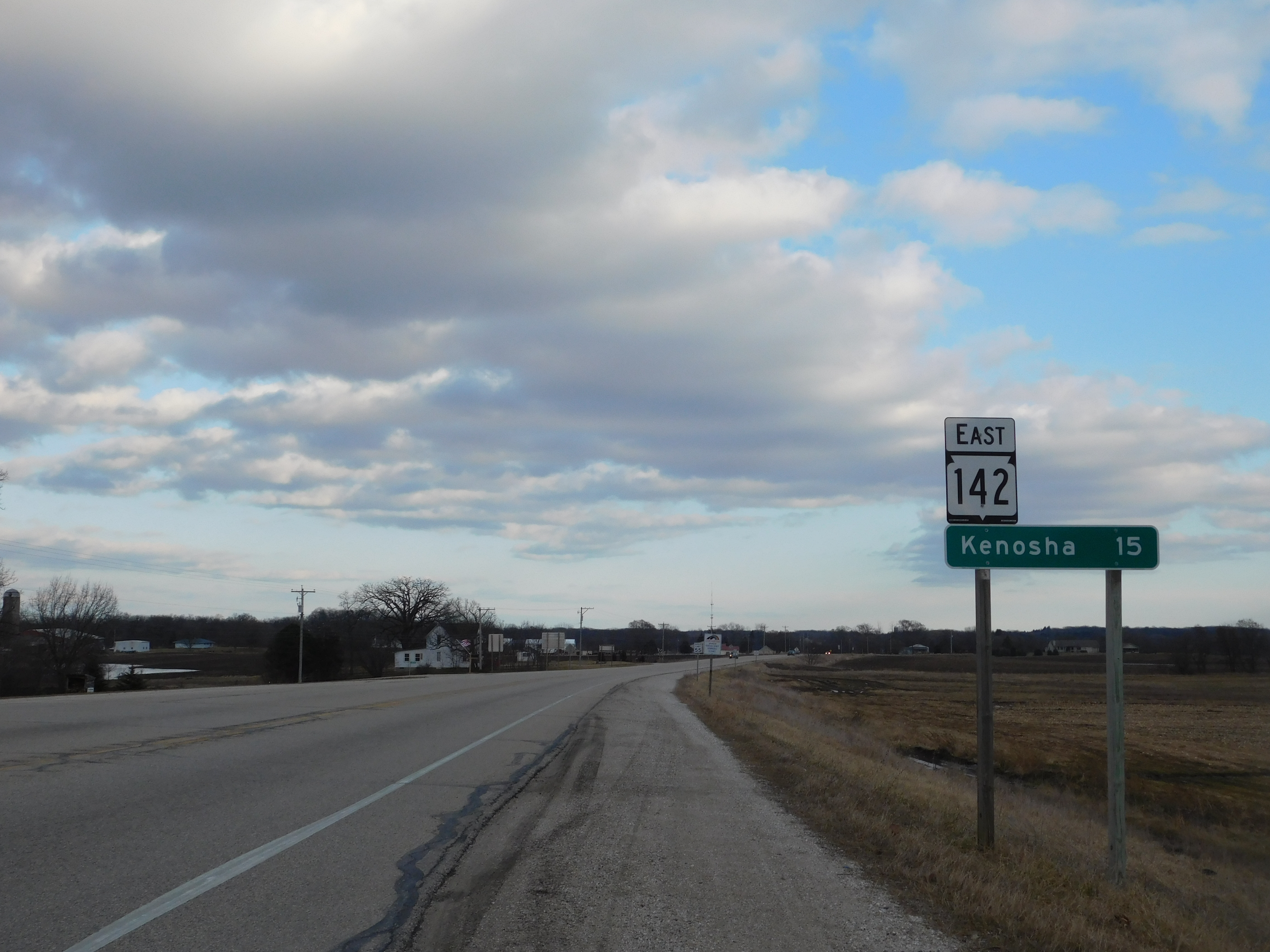
WIS 142 eastbound from WIS 75

Prior to 1992, WIS 142 extended from I-94/US-41 along what is called Washington Road into Kenosha. WIS 142 ended at WIS 32 (Sheridan Road) on Kenosha's north side. In 1992, WisDOT turned the eastern section back to city and county control. The section is now known as County Highway S.

Prior to the opening of the Burlington Bypass, WIS 142 extended into Burlington. WIS 142 ended at WIS 11 on Burlington's east side. In 2010, with the completion of the eastern section of the Burlington Bypass, WIS 142 was truncated to end at WIS 83. (With the completion of the entire bypass, the terminus now consists of WIS 11, WIS 36, and WIS 83.)

== Major intersections ==
County	Location	mi	km	Destinations	Notes
Racine	Town of Burlington			WIS 11 / WIS 36 / WIS 83 – Burlington, Milwaukee CTH-R west	Roadway continues at CTH-R
Kenosha	Town of Brighton			WIS 75 – Kansasville, Paddock Lake	
Kenosha	Town of Paris			US 45 – Union Grove, Bristol	
Kenosha	Paris–Somers town line			I-41 / I-94 / US 41 – Milwaukee, Chicago CTH-S east – Kenosha	Roadway continues as CTH-S; I-94 exit 340
1.000 mi = 1.609 km; 1.000 km = 0.621 mi
