= Wisconsin Highway 11 =

State highway in Wisconsin, United States

State Trunk Highway 11
- WIS 11; mainline in red, business route in blue

Route information
- Maintained by WisDOT
- Length: 157.56 mi (253.57 km)

Major junctions
- West end: US 61 / US 151 / WIS 35 in Hazel Green
- US 51 in Janesville; I-39 / I-90 in Janesville; I-39 / I-90 in Janesville; US 14 in Janesville; US 14 / WIS 89 in Darien; I-43 in Elkhorn; US 45 in Union Grove; I-41 / I-94 / US 41 in Mt. Pleasant
- East end: WIS 32 / LMCT in Racine

Location
- Country: United States
- State: Wisconsin
- Counties: Grant, Lafayette, Green, Rock, Walworth, Racine

Highway system
- Wisconsin State Trunk Highway System; Interstate; US; State; Scenic; Rustic
← WIS 10	→ US 12
← WIS 341	WIS 351	→ WIS 441

State Trunk Highway 11 (often called Highway 11, STH-11 or WIS 11) is a state highway running east–west across southern Wisconsin. The highway connects Dubuque, Iowa with the cities of Janesville, Racine and Elkhorn. Most of the route is two-lane road with the exception of an expressway bypass of Monroe, a multilane bypass of Janesville, a section where it is concurrent with I-39 and I-90, a combined freeway/divided highway bypass of Burlington to the south, where it is partially concurrent with WI 36 and WI 83, and urban multilane highway in the greater Racine area.

== Route description ==
WIS 11 begins in Grant County at the freeway carrying US 61 and US 151 and concurrent with WIS 35. WIS 35 turns south to Illinois a half of a mile into the route as WIS 11 meanders to the east to Hazel Green where it picks up WIS 80 north for 3 miles (4.8 km) before turning east again into Lafayette County while WIS 80 continues north along the county line. The highway passes through Benton and Shullsburg before reaching the WIS 23 southern terminus five miles (8 km) east of Shullsburg. WIS 11 then junctions with WIS 78 in Gratiot and passes through South Wayne two miles (3 km) west of the Green County line.

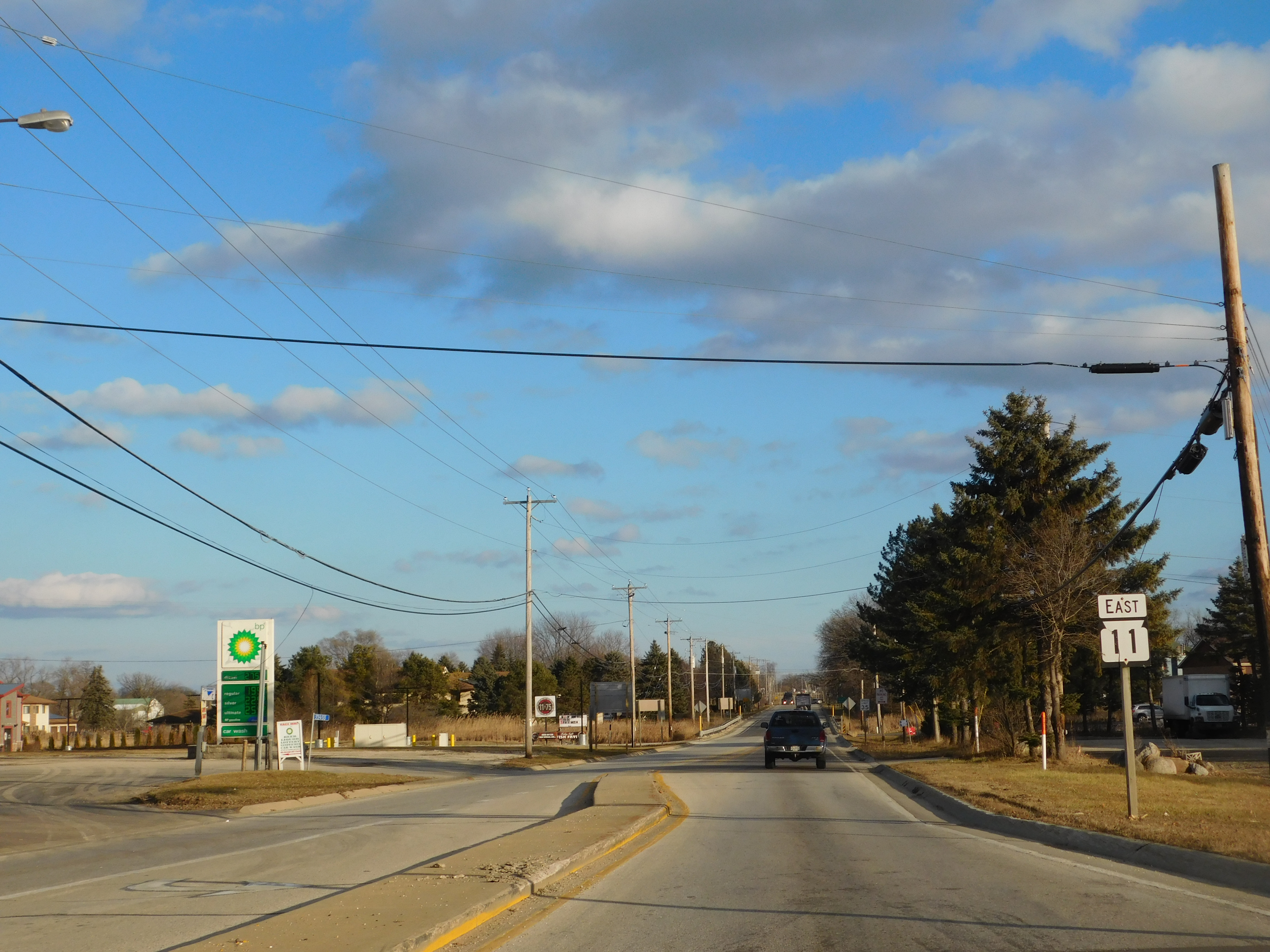
WIS 11 eastbound from WIS 75 in Kansasville

Browntown is the first community that WIS 11 passes through in Green County. WIS 11 then becomes a freeway and circles around Monroe to the north, picking up concurrency with WIS 81 east and Crossing WIS 69 and the terminus of WIS 59 while on the freeway segment. WIS 81 turns southeast toward Beloit two miles (3 km) south of Brodhead while WIS 11 passes through the city and turns east into Rock County. The highway crosses WIS 213 in Orfordville and passes through Footville before beginning its southern bypass of Janesville. The bypass crosses US 51 and then joins I-39 and I-90 for 3 miles (4.8 km) back up north where it turns east toward US 14 and joins it concurrently - the two routes continuing east to Walworth County.

Two miles into Walworth County, US 14 turns south to Darien while WIS 11 heads east into Delavan where it meets WIS 50. the highway heads northeast to Elkhorn where it junctions with WIS 67 and the freeways of US 12 which it does not have direct access to, and I-43. WIS 11 then heads east through Spring Prairie and into Racine County at Burlington. A bypass of Burlington was completed in 2010 and WIS 11 now travels around the south side of Burlington and bypassing the downtown area. In Burlington, the highway crosses or meets WIS 36, WIS 83 and WIS 142. WIS 11 passes through Union Grove and crosses US 45 then passes over I-94, I-41, and US 41 and into the greater Racine area - crossing WIS 31 in Sturtevant and ending at WIS 32 in downtown Racine - just a half mile from the shores of Lake Michigan.

== History ==
The current Highway 11 is the second route to be known by that name. The first Highway 11 ran from Prairie du Sac to Gotham, then to LaCrosse, and then to Superior. The route that WIS 11 currently follows was previously designated WIS 20 from the Iowa state line to Burlington. The remaining route was not a part of the state highway system at the time.

State Trunk Highway 351
- Location: Janesville
- Length: 2.64 mi (4.25 km)
- Existed: c. 1988–2002

WIS 11 previously ran through downtown Janesville. A southern bypass was constructed and opened to traffic on November 11, 2002. The former route was turned back to the city and county but not given any county route designations. The bypass consisted of a two-lane road between the western end and CTH-D, and four-lane roadway between CTH-D and the interstates. The section of WIS 11 between I-39/I-90 and US 51 was previously numbered as WIS 351.

The Burlington Bypass was first proposed in the 1990s around the south of the city. It was completed in 2010 at a cost of $118 million. The route was built out as a four lane roadway, as a result of a major overestimate in the amount of projected traffic. For this reason, it was included in WisPIRGs list of highway boondoggles.

== Major intersections ==
County	Location	mi	km	Destinations	Notes
Grant	Sandy Hook	0.0	0.0	US 61 / US 151 / WIS 35 north / Great River Road north – Dubuque, Madison	Western end of WIS 35/Great River Road concurrency; US 61/US 151 exit 1
Grant	Sandy Hook	0.5	0.80	WIS 35 south / Great River Road south – East Dubuque	Eastern end of WIS 35/Great River Road concurrency
Grant	Hazel Green	9.9	15.9	WIS 80 south – Galena	Western end of WIS 80 concurrency
Grant	Hazel Green	12.7	20.4	WIS 80 north – Cuba City, Platteville	Eastern end of WIS 80 concurrency
Lafayette	Shullsburg	28.8	46.3	WIS 23 north – Darlington	Southern terminus of WIS 23
Lafayette	Gratiot	34.4	55.4	WIS 78 south – Warren	Western end of WIS 78 concurrency
Lafayette	Gratiot	34.8	56.0	WIS 78 north – Argyle	Eastern end of WIS 78 concurrency
Green	Monroe			Bus. WIS 11 (6th Avenue West) / CTH-N	Interchange
Green	Monroe	55.1	88.7	WIS 69 south / WIS 81 west – Freeport, Argyle	Western end of WIS 69/WIS 81 concurrency; interchange
Green	Monroe	55.9	90.0	WIS 69 north / Bus. WIS 11 – Verona	Wastern end of WIS 69 concurrency; interchange
Green	Monroe	57.0	91.7	WIS 59 east – Albany, Evansville	Interchange
Green	Brodhead	68.8	110.7	WIS 81 east – Beloit	Eastern end of WIS 81 concurrency
Green	Brodhead	72.5	116.7	WIS 104 north – Brooklyn	
Rock	Orfordville	77.8	125.2	WIS 213 – Beloit, Evansville	
Rock	Janesville	93.1	149.8	US 51 – Beloit, Janesville	
Rock	Janesville	95.6	153.9	I-39 south / I-90 east – Beloit, Rockford	Western end of I-39/I-90 concurrency; I-39/I-90 exit 177
Rock	Janesville	98.1	157.9	I-39 north / I-90 west – Madison	Eastern end of I-39/I-90 concurrency; I-39/I-90 exit 175
Rock	Janesville	99.5	160.1	US 14 west – Janesville	Western end of US 14 concurrency
Rock	Emerald Grove	104	167	WIS 140 south – Clinton	
Walworth	Darien	111	179	US 14 east / WIS 89 north – Darien, Whitewater	Eastern end of US 14 concurrency
Walworth	Delavan	116	187	WIS 50 east – Lake Geneva	
Walworth	Elkhorn	122	196	WIS 67 – Whitewater, Williams Bay	
Walworth	Elkhorn	124	200	I-43 – Beloit, Milwaukee	I-43 exit 29
Walworth	Spring Prairie	130	210	WIS 120 – Lake Geneva, East Troy	
Racine	Burlington	135	217	WIS 36 south – Lyons, Lake Geneva	Western end of WIS 36 concurrency
Racine	Burlington	138	222	WIS 83 south – Paddock Lake	Western end of WIS 83 concurrency
Racine	Burlington	139	224	WIS 142 east – Kenosha	
Racine	Burlington	141	227	WIS 36 north / WIS 83 north – Milwaukee	Eastern end of WIS 36/WIS 83 concurrency
Racine	Kansasville	147	237	CTH-BD – Kansasville, Eagle Lake	Formerly WIS 75
Racine	Union Grove	150	240	US 45 – Bristol, Muskego, Milwaukee	
Racine	Sturtevant	155	249	I-41 / I-94 / US 41 – Chicago, Milwaukee	I-41/I-94 exit 335
Racine	Sturtevant	160	260	WIS 31 (Green Bay Road)	
Racine	Racine	163	262	WIS 32 / LMCT (Sheridan Road)	
1.000 mi = 1.609 km; 1.000 km = 0.621 mi: Concurrency terminus

== Business route ==
Business State Trunk Highway 11
- Location: Monroe

Business State Trunk Highway 11 (Bus. WIS 11) in Monroe is business route of WIS 11. It follows the former alignment of WIS 11 through the city of Monroe.
