= Wisconsin Highway 67 =

Highway in Wisconsin

State Trunk Highway 67
- WIS 67 highlighted in red

Route information
- Maintained by WisDOT
- Length: 160.11 mi (257.67 km)
- Existed: 1916–present

Major junctions
- South end: IL 75 in Beloit
- US 14 in Walworth; I-43 in Elkhorn; US 12 in Elkhorn; US 12 / WIS 20 in LaGrange; US 18 in Dousman; I-94 in Dousman; I-41 / US 41 in Lomira; US 45 in Campbellsport; WIS 32 / WIS 57 in Kiel
- North end: US 151 in Valders

Location
- Country: United States
- State: Wisconsin
- Counties: Rock, Walworth, Waukesha, Dodge, Fond du Lac, Sheboygan, Manitowoc

Highway system
- Wisconsin State Trunk Highway System; Interstate; US; State; Scenic; Rustic
← WIS 66	→ WIS 68

State Trunk Highway 67 (often called Highway 67, STH-67 or WIS 67) is a Wisconsin state highway running from the Wisconsin–Illinois state line east of Beloit north to U.S. Highway 151 (US 151) east of Chilton. With the inclusion of the new Oconomowoc bypass, WIS 67 is approximately 160 miles (260 km) in length.

WIS 67 meanders through much of Southeastern Wisconsin, passing through both the northern and southern units of the Kettle Moraine State Forest. It ends just south of the Killsnake State Wildlife Area in Manitowoc County.

== Route description ==
The southern end of WIS 67 is located on the far east side of Beloit at the Wisconsin–Illinois state line just east of Interstate 90/Interstate 39 (I-90/I-39) where it becomes Illinois Route 75 (IL 75). IL 75 continues westward to South Beloit and Freeport, Illinois.

The northern terminus of the route is at U.S. Highway 151 outside of Chilton, west-southwest of Valders

WIS 67 passes by Old World Wisconsin in Eagle, a "living" outdoor museum run by the State Historical Society of Wisconsin. It also passes Road America in Elkhart Lake; Road America has been the host of many international racing events, from motorcycle to sports car to IndyCar races on its four-mile-long (6.4 km) road course.

== History ==
Initially, WIS 67 traveled from WIS 23 in Plymouth to WIS 48 (now WIS 32/WIS 57) in New Holstein via parts of its present-day routing and present-day CTH-J. In 1920, WIS 67 was superseded by WIS 57's northern extension. As a result, it moved onto another part of its present-day route. The new route traveled from WIS 59/WIS 99 (now just WIS 59) in Eagle to WIS 26 (now WIS 28) in Mayville. In 1924, WIS 67 was extended from both ends. At its northern end, WIS 67 extended northeast to WIS 23 in Plymouth, its former route's southern terminus. At its southern end, WIS 67 extended south via the former southernmost portion of WIS 59. This is because WIS 59 diverged westward from Eagle and extended towards Monroe.

In 1947, WIS 67 extended south via US 12 and former CTH-H to WIS 36 (part of it is now Geneva Street) in Williams Bay. In 1956, part of WIS 57 moved eastward away from Plymouth. As a result, WIS 67 extended northward to WIS 32/WIS 57 in Kiel via WIS 57's former portion. This extension restored the southern half of WIS 67's oldest alignment. Around 1968, WIS 67 extended southwest to US 14 in Walworth, superseding part of WIS 36 in the process. Around 1979, WIS 67 extended southward via US 14 and then westward along CTH-W to WIS 140 north of the Illinois state line.

== Major intersections ==
County	Location	mi	km	Destinations	Notes
Rock	Town of Turtle	0.00	0.00	IL 75 west – South Beloit, Freeport	Continuation into Illinois
Rock	Town of Clinton	6.1	9.8	WIS 140 – Clinton, Belvidere	
Walworth	Town of Walworth	19.6	31.5	US 14 east – Harvard	Southern end of US 14 overlap
Walworth	Walworth	21.1	34.0	US 14 west (Main Street / Beloit Street)	Northern end of US 14 overlap
Walworth	Town of Delavan	28.5	45.9	WIS 50 – Lake Geneva, Delavan	
Walworth	Elkhorn	32.4	52.1	I-43 – Beloit, Milwaukee	I-43 exit 25
Walworth	Elkhorn	33.6	54.1	WIS 11 west (W. Walworth Street)	Southern end of WIS 11 overlap
Walworth	Elkhorn	33.7	54.2	WIS 11 east (E. Court Street)	Northern end of WIS 11 overlap
Walworth	Elkhorn	35.4	57.0	US 12 east to I-43	Southern end of US 12 overlap
Walworth	Town of La Grange	42.9	69.0	US 12 west / WIS 20 east – Whitewater, East Troy	Northern end of US 12 overlap
Waukesha	Eagle	50.7	81.6	WIS 59 / Kettle Moraine Scenic Drive south	Southern end of Kettle Moraine Scenic Drive overlap
Waukesha	Town of Ottawa	54.7	88.0	CTH-ZZ / Kettle Moraine Scenic Drive north	Northern end of Kettle Moraine Scenic Drive overlap
Waukesha	Dousman–Summit line	61.2	98.5	US 18 – Sullivan, Waukesha	
Waukesha	Summit–Oconomowoc line	64.6	104.0	I-94 – Milwaukee, Madison	I-94 exit 282
Waukesha	Oconomowoc	67.4	108.5	WIS 16 east – Oconomowoc	Southern end of WIS 16 overlap
Waukesha	Town of Oconomowoc	71.1	114.4	WIS 16 west – Oconomowoc	Northern end of WIS 16 overlap
Dodge	Town of Rubicon	83.5	134.4	WIS 60 – Hustisford, Hartford	
Dodge	Hubbard–Herman town line	92.6	149.0	WIS 33 – Horicon, West Bend	
Dodge	Mayville	96.2	154.8	WIS 28 west (Horicon Street)	Southern end of WIS 28 overlap
Dodge	Theresa	102.0	164.2	WIS 175 south (Milwaukee Street)	Southern end of WIS 175 overlap
Dodge	Town of Theresa	103.2	166.1	WIS 28 east – Kewaskum	Northern end of WIS 28 overlap
Dodge	Lomira	106.8	171.9	WIS 175 north (Milwaukee Street)	Northern end of WIS 175 overlap
Dodge	Lomira	107.8	173.5	I-41 / US 41 – Fond du Lac, Milwaukee, Green Bay	
Fond du Lac	Town of Auburn	118.7	191.0	US 45 – Kewaskum, Eden	
Fond du Lac	Town of Osceola	122.1	196.5	CTH-G / Kettle Moraine Scenic Drive south	Western end of Kettle Moraine Scenic Drive overlap
Fond du Lac	Town of Osceola	122.5	197.1	CTH-F / Kettle Moraine Scenic Drive north	Eastern end of Kettle Moraine Scenic Drive overlap
Sheboygan	Town of Greenbush	131.7	212.0	Kettle Moraine Scenic Drive north	Western end of Kettle Moraine Scenic Drive overlap
Sheboygan	Town of Greenbush	132.2	212.8	CTH-A / Kettle Moraine Scenic Drive south	Eastern end of Kettle Moraine Scenic Drive overlap
Sheboygan	Plymouth	140.0	225.3	WIS 23 – Kohler, Sheboygan, Fond du Lac	Interchange
Manitowoc	Kiel	151.3	243.5	WIS 32 / WIS 57	Roundabout
Manitowoc	Town of Eaton	160.11	257.67	US 151 – Chilton, Valders, Manitowoc	Northern Terminus
1.000 mi = 1.609 km; 1.000 km = 0.621 mi: Concurrency terminus
