= Wisconsin Highway 50 =

State highway in Wisconsin, United States

State Trunk Highway 50
- WIS 50 highlighted in red

Route information
- Maintained by WisDOT
- Length: 44.43 mi (71.50 km)

Major junctions
- West end: WIS 11 in Delavan
- I-43 in Delavan; US 12 / WIS 120 in Lake Geneva; US 45 in Bristol; I-41 / I-94 / US 41 in Kenosha
- East end: WIS 32 / LMCT in Kenosha

Location
- Country: United States
- State: Wisconsin
- Counties: Walworth, Kenosha

Highway system
- Wisconsin State Trunk Highway System; Interstate; US; State; Scenic; Rustic
← WIS 49	→ US 51

State Trunk Highway 50 (often called Highway 50, STH-50 or WIS 50) is a 44.43-mile (71.50 km) state highway in Walworth and Kenosha counties in Wisconsin, United States, that runs from WIS 11 in Delavan east to WIS 32 in Kenosha. The highway is maintained by the Wisconsin Department of Transportation (WisDOT).

== Route description ==
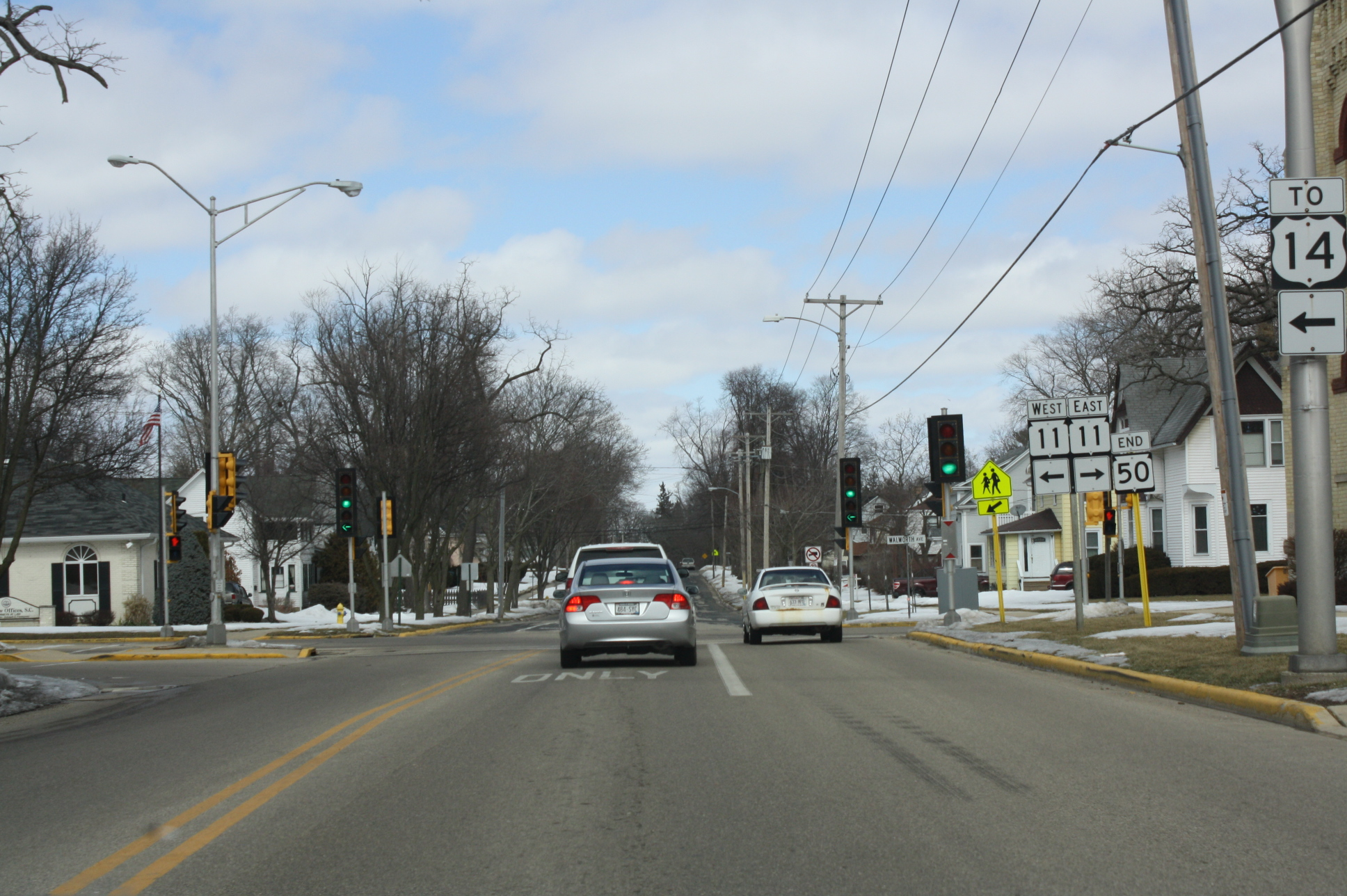
Western terminus in Delavan

WIS 50 begins at an intersection with WIS 11 in Delavan. The highway crosses Wisconsin and Southern Railroad tracks and heads east to a junction with Interstate 43 (I-43) at exit 21. WIS 50 continues southeast out of Delavan, crossing Delavan Lake at the city's eastern border, and intersects WIS 67 north of Williams Bay. WIS 50 heads east from this intersection toward Lake Geneva, where it intersects WIS 120. Shortly after this intersection, WIS 50 meets US Highway 12 (US 12) at exit 330. The highway continues eastward from Lake Geneva to the border of Kenosha County.

After entering Kenosha County, WIS 50 passes the community of Slades Corners before meeting WIS 83 in New Munster. The two highways run concurrently and continue eastward until they meet Highway 75 in Paddock Lake. At this junction, WIS 83 turns southward, and WIS 50 continues eastward toward Bristol. The highway intersects US 45 in Bristol and continues east to meet I-94/US 41 at exit 344. WIS 50 then straddles the border of Kenosha and Pleasant Prairie, meeting WIS 31 along this border. The highway then turns northeasterly and passes through Kenosha before terminating at WIS 32.

== History ==
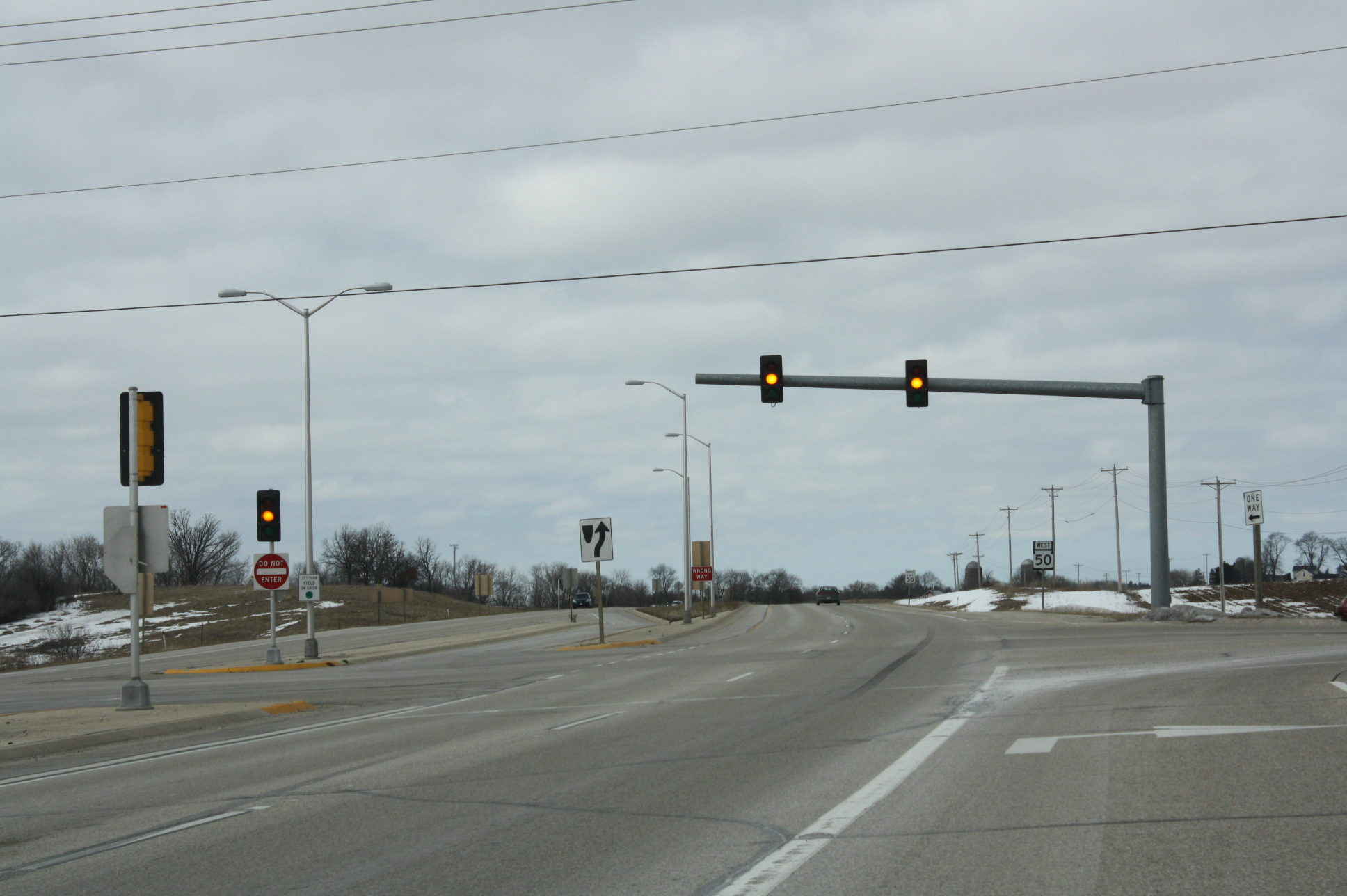
WIS 50 in Slades Corners

WIS 50 was designated in 1917, and signage for the highway was posted in 1918. The highway has changed little since and still follows its original route for most of its length. The route of WIS 50 through Kenosha changed in 1997; the highway moved from 75th Street to a more northerly alignment along Roosevelt Road and 63rd Street.

== Major intersections ==
County	Location	mi	km	Destinations	Notes
Walworth	Delavan	0.0	0.0	WIS 11 – Elkhorn, Janesville	
Walworth	Delavan	1.4	2.3	I-43 – Milwaukee, Beloit	
Walworth	Williams Bay	6.1	9.8	WIS 67 – Elkhorn, Williams Bay	
Walworth	Lake Geneva	13.2	21.2	WIS 120 south	Western end of WIS 120 concurrency
Walworth	Lake Geneva	13.5	21.7	US 12 / WIS 120 north – Madison, Chicago	Eastern end of WIS 120 concurrency
Kenosha	New Munster	23.6	38.0	WIS 83 north – Burlington	Western end of WIS 83 concurrency
Kenosha	Paddock Lake	29.1	46.8	CTH-BD north – Burlington WIS 83 south – Salem	Eastern end of WIS 83 concurrency
Kenosha	Village of Bristol	32.6	52.5	US 45 – Union Grove, Bristol	
Kenosha	Kenosha–Pleasant Prairie city/village line	37.4	60.2	I-41 / I-94 / US 41 – Milwaukee, Chicago	
Kenosha	Kenosha	40.7	65.5	WIS 31 – Racine, Waukegan	
Kenosha	Kenosha	44.4	71.5	WIS 32 / LMCT (Sheridan Road)	
1.000 mi = 1.609 km; 1.000 km = 0.621 mi: Concurrency terminus
