= Klondike, Kenosha County, Wisconsin =

Klondike, Wisconsin
- Unincorporated community
- Location within Wisconsin Location within the United States
- Coordinates: 42°35′24″N 88°07′10″W
- Country: United States
- State: Wisconsin
- County: Kenosha
- Town: Brighton
- Elevation: 833 ft (254 m)
- Time zone: UTC-6 (Central (CST))
  - Summer (DST): UTC-5 (CDT)
- Area code: 262
- GNIS feature ID: 1567552

Klondike is an unincorporated residential and agricultural community in the town of Brighton, in Kenosha County, Wisconsin, United States.

== History ==
Klondike was first settled in the 19th century and was formerly known as "Klondike Corner". It is centered at Highway 75 and 52nd Street (Kenosha County Highway NN). The Union League Camp facility, which houses an Army Reserve enrichment program, is located on 244th Avenue at 52nd Street in Klondike. Until July 20, 1941, when the Union League Club of Chicago took over the site, it had been a communist youth camp called Camp Nitgedeiget (meaning "don't worry" in Yiddish) where the Third Internationale had been sung and a hammer and sickle flag was raised daily.
