= Richard Bong State Recreation Area =

Recreation area in Wisconsin, United States

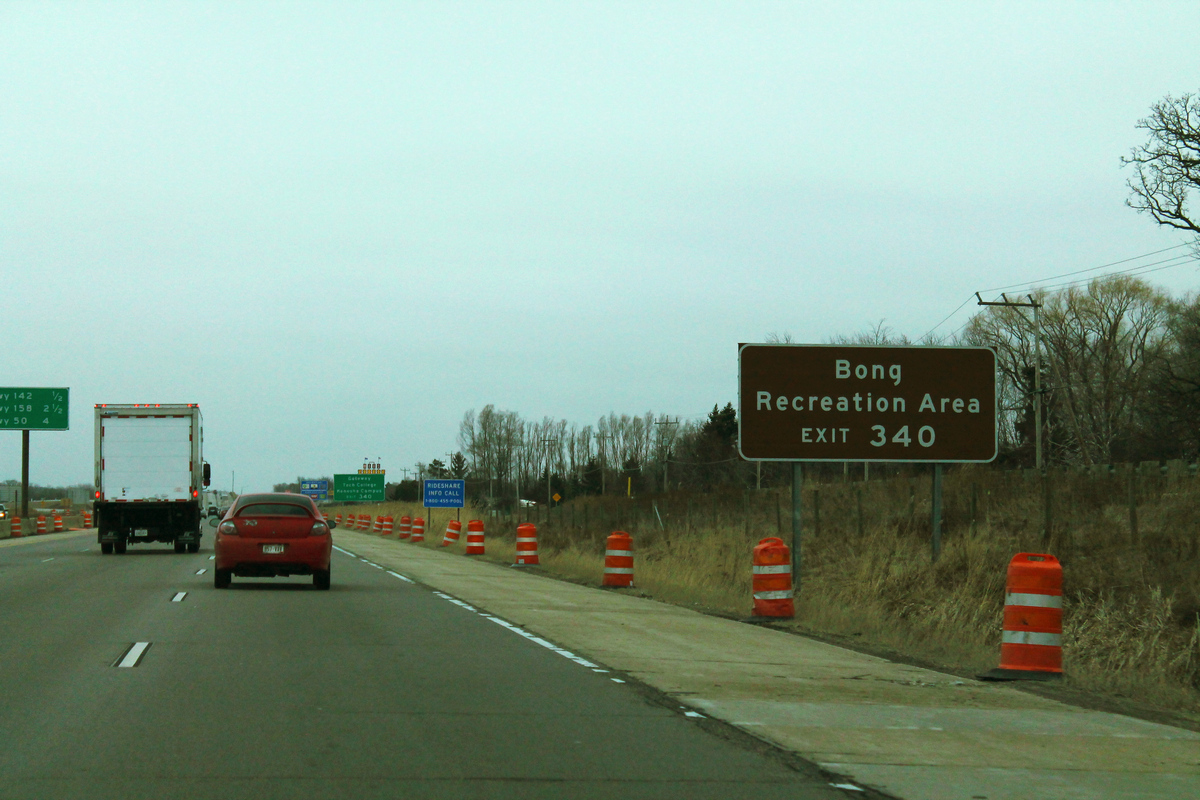
- Sign for the recreation area on Interstate 94

- Location within Wisconsin Location within the United States
- Interactive map of Richard Bong State Recreation Area
- Location: Kenosha County, Wisconsin, United States
- Coordinates: 42°38′2″N 88°8′36″W
- Area: 4,515 acres (1,827 ha)
- Established: 1963
- Administrator: Wisconsin Department of Natural Resources
- Named for: Richard Bong
- Website: Official website
- Wisconsin State Parks

Richard Bong State Recreation Area is a 4,515-acre (1,827 ha) unit of the state park system of the U.S. state of Wisconsin. It is located in the town of Brighton, in Kenosha County. This managed prairie contains 8.3 miles (13 km) of mountain bike trails. Other recreational activities include high power rocketry, swimming, dogsledding, falconry, ATV sports, land sailing, horseback riding, hunting, fishing, camping with amenities, and ultralight aviation. There is a wildlife preserve where great egrets, sandhill cranes, and great blue herons are known to nest. The Richard Bong SRA is one of the centerpieces of the proposed Hackmatack National Wildlife Refuge.

== Richard Bong Air Force Base ==
The park is on land once intended for the Richard Bong Air Force Base, whose namesake is World War II veteran aviator Maj. Richard Ira Bong. Part of what was intended to be the 12,500-foot (3,800 m) main airstrip is still visible from aerial photos of the site.

== Theft of signs ==
Largely due to its name's coincidental allusions to cannabis use, Bong Recreation Area is a frequent target of sign theft. This has led to the manufacturing of T-shirts and sweatshirts bearing the highway exit sign.
