= Eagle Lake, Wisconsin =

Census-designated place in Wisconsin, United States

- CDP
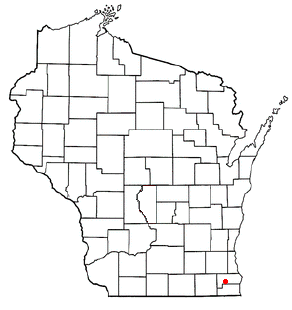
- Location of Eagle Lake, Wisconsin
- Coordinates: 42°41′51″N 88°8′1″W
- Country: United States
- State: Wisconsin
- County: Racine

Area
  - Total: 3.0 sq mi (7.8 km^{2})
  - Land: 2.2 sq mi (5.7 km^{2})
  - Water: 0.81 sq mi (2.1 km^{2})
- Elevation: 801 ft (244 m)

Population (2020)
  - Total: 1,251
  - Density: 570/sq mi (220/km^{2})
- Time zone: UTC-6 (Central (CST))
  - Summer (DST): UTC-5 (CDT)
- Area code: 262
- FIPS code: 55-21525
- GNIS feature ID: 1867656

Eagle Lake is a census-designated place (CDP) in the town of Dover, Racine County, Wisconsin, United States. The population was 1,251 at the 2020 census.

== Geography ==
Eagle Lake is located at 42°41′51″N 88°8′1″W (42.697369, -88.133741).

According to the United States Census Bureau, the CDP has a total area of 3.0 square miles (7.8 km^{2}), of which 2.2 square miles (5.7 km^{2}) is land and 0.8 square mile (2.1 km^{2}) (27.00%) is water.

Racine County's Eagle Lake Park is located on the north side of the lake. The park's entrance is found on Church Road, approximately one quarter of a mile west of Wisconsin Highway 75. Eagle Lake Park includes green space, a public boat launch, a baseball/softball diamond, several picnic areas (including a covered partitioned pavilion), restrooms, as well as playground equipment.

== Demographics ==
Historical population
Census	Pop.	Note	%±
2000	1,320		—
2010	1,192		−9.7%
2020	1,251		4.9%
U.S. Decennial Census

As of the census of 2000, there were 1,320 people, 483 households, and 351 families residing in the CDP. The population density was 603.2 people per square mile (232.7/km^{2}). There were 619 housing units at an average density of 282.9/sq mi (109.1/km^{2}). The racial makeup of the CDP was 95.68% White, 0.38% African American, 0.83% Native American, 1.06% Asian, 1.14% from other races, and 0.91% from two or more races. Hispanic or Latino of any race were 5.61% of the population.

There were 483 households, out of which 41.4% had children under the age of 18 living with them, 59.2% were married couples living together, 9.1% had a female householder with no husband present, and 27.3% were non-families. 20.1% of all households were made up of individuals, and 5.6% had someone living alone who was 65 years of age or older. The average household size was 2.73 and the average family size was 3.19.

In the CDP, the population was spread out, with 29.5% under the age of 18, 7.0% from 18 to 24, 34.8% from 25 to 44, 21.4% from 45 to 64, and 7.3% who were 65 years of age or older. The median age was 35 years. For every 100 females, there were 99.7 males. For every 100 females age 18 and over, there were 101.1 males.

The median income for a household in the CDP was $47,650, and the median income for a family was $47,800. Males had a median income of $38,542 versus $29,554 for females. The per capita income for the CDP was $23,540. About 2.9% of families and 5.3% of the population were below the poverty line, including 6.3% of those under age 18 and none of those age 65 or over.
