= Brighton, Kenosha County, Wisconsin =

Town of Brighton, Wisconsin
- Town
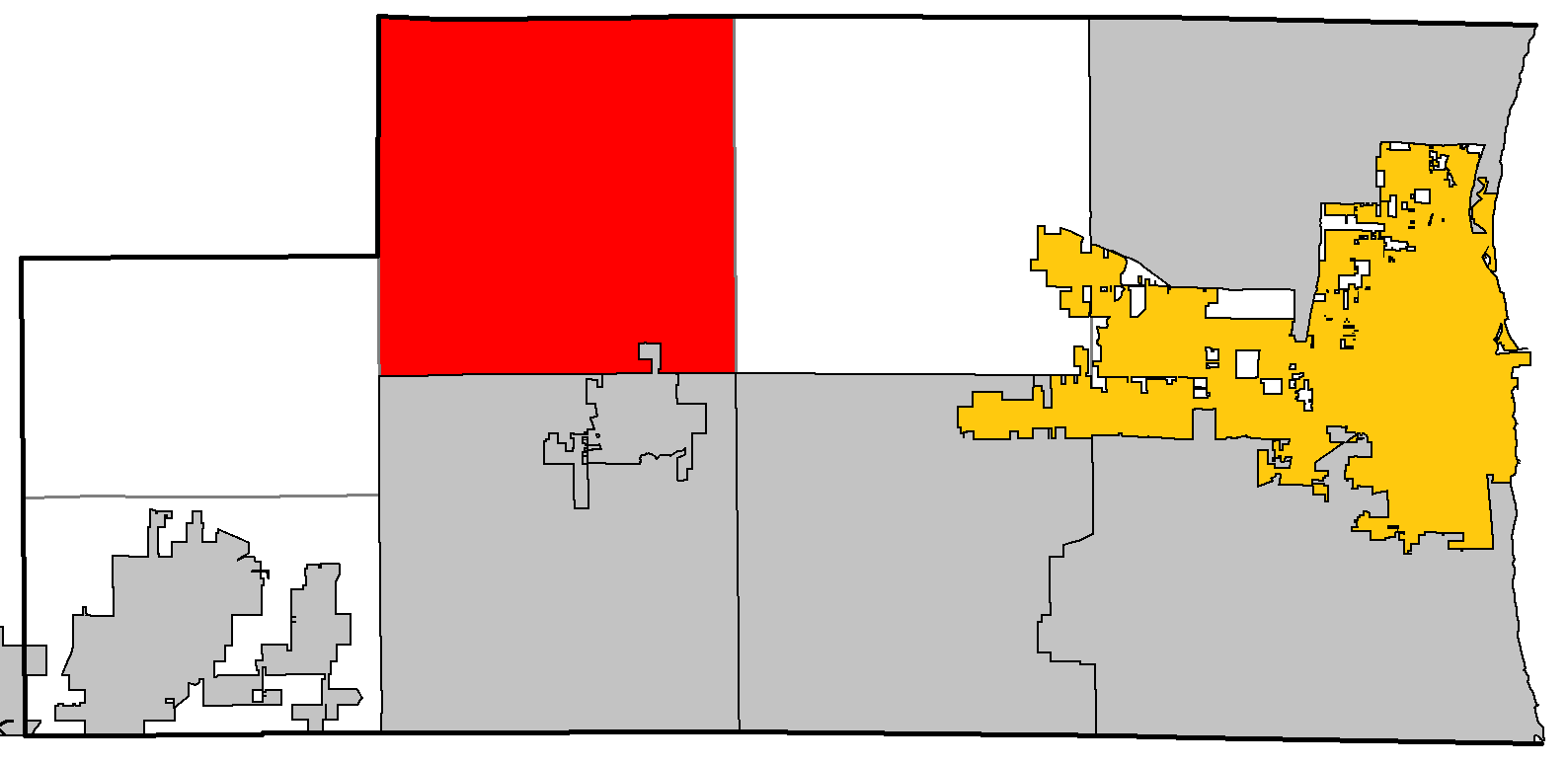
- Location of the Town of Brighton, within Kenosha County
- Coordinates: 42°36′55″N 88°7′21″W
- Country: United States
- State: Wisconsin
- County: Kenosha

Area
  - Total: 35.8 sq mi (92.8 km^{2})
  - Land: 35.6 sq mi (92.3 km^{2})
  - Water: 0.19 sq mi (0.5 km^{2})
- Elevation: 784 ft (239 m)

Population (2020)
  - Total: 1,422
  - Density: 41/sq mi (15.8/km^{2})
- Time zone: UTC-6 (Central (CST))
  - Summer (DST): UTC-5 (CDT)
- Area code: 262
- FIPS code: 55-09635
- GNIS feature ID: 1582859
- Website: brightonwi.org

The Town of Brighton is a town located in Kenosha County, Wisconsin, United States. The population was 1,422 at the 2020 census. The unincorporated communities of Brighton and Klondike are located within the town.

== History ==
The first settlers in Brighton, a Dr. Johnson and a Mr. Wightman, arrived almost simultaneously in 1838. A post office opened in 1846 and closed in 1903.

== Geography ==
According to the United States Census Bureau, the town has a total area of 35.8 square miles (92.8 km^{2}), of which 35.6 square miles (92.3 km^{2}) are land and 0.2 square miles (0.5 km^{2}), or 0.55%, are water.

== Demographics ==
Historical population
Census	Pop.	Note	%±
2000	1,450		—
2010	1,456		0.4%
2020	1,422		−2.3%
U.S. Decennial Census

=== 2020 census ===
Brighton town, Kenosha County, Wisconsin – Racial and ethnic composition Note: the US Census treats Hispanic/Latino as an ethnic category. This table excludes Latinos from the racial categories and assigns them to a separate category. Hispanics/Latinos may be of any race.
Race / Ethnicity (NH = Non-Hispanic)	Pop 2000	Pop 2010	Pop 2020	% 2000	% 2010	% 2020
White alone (NH)	1,391	1,407	1,321	95.93%	96.63%	92.90%
Black or African American alone (NH)	3	7	3	0.21%	0.48%	0.21%
Native American or Alaska Native alone (NH)	3	0	0	0.21%	0.00%	0.00%
Asian alone (NH)	8	8	8	0.55%	0.55%	0.56%
Native Hawaiian or Pacific Islander alone (NH)	1	0	0	0.07%	0.00%	0.00%
Other race alone (NH)	0	0	0	0.00%	0.00%	0.00%
Mixed race or Multiracial (NH)	14	9	35	0.97%	0.62%	2.46%
Hispanic or Latino (any race)	30	25	55	2.07%	1.72%	3.87%
Total	1,450	1,456	1,422	100.00%	100.00%	100.00%

=== 2000 census ===
As of the census of 2000, there were 1,450 people, 504 households, and 402 families residing in the town. The population density was 40.5 inhabitants per square mile (15.6/km^{2}). There were 524 housing units at an average density of 14.6 per square mile (5.6/km^{2}). The racial makeup of the town was 97.24% White, 0.21% African American, 0.21% Native American, 0.55% Asian, 0.07% Pacific Islander, 0.55% from other races, and 1.17% from two or more races. Hispanic or Latino of any race were 2.07% of the population.

There were 504 households, out of which 35.5% had children under the age of 18 living with them, 69.6% were married couples living together, 5.2% had a female householder with no husband present, and 20.2% were non-families. 15.5% of all households were made up of individuals, and 5.4% had someone living alone who was 65 years of age or older. The average household size was 2.88 and the average family size was 3.20.

In the town, the population was age distributed as follows: 26.8% under the age of 18, 6.6% from 18 to 24, 29.9% from 25 to 44, 26.9% from 45 to 64, and 9.7% who were over 64 years. The median age was 39 years. For every 100 females, there were 107.4 males. For every 100 females age 18 and over, there were 108.0 males.

The median income for a household in the town was $70,078, and the median income for a family was $74,479. Males had a median income of $42,321 versus $31,827 for females. The per capita income for the town was $26,518. About 1.0% of families and 1.9% of the population were below the poverty line, including 1.1% of those under age 18 and 1.5% of those age 65 or over.

== Notable people ==
- Dwight L. Burgess, farmer and legislator, was born in and was chairman of what is now the town
- Lathrop Burgess, farmer and legislator, lived in the town
- John Dixon, businessman and legislator, was born in the town
- Mathias J. Scholey, mayor of Kenosha and Wisconsin state representative, was born in the town

== Points of interest ==
- Richard Bong State Recreation Area, former site of the unfinished R.I. Bong Air Force Base and Wisconsin's largest area of preserved prairie, is located in the western part of Brighton.
