= Kansasville, Wisconsin =

Kansasville
- Unincorporated community
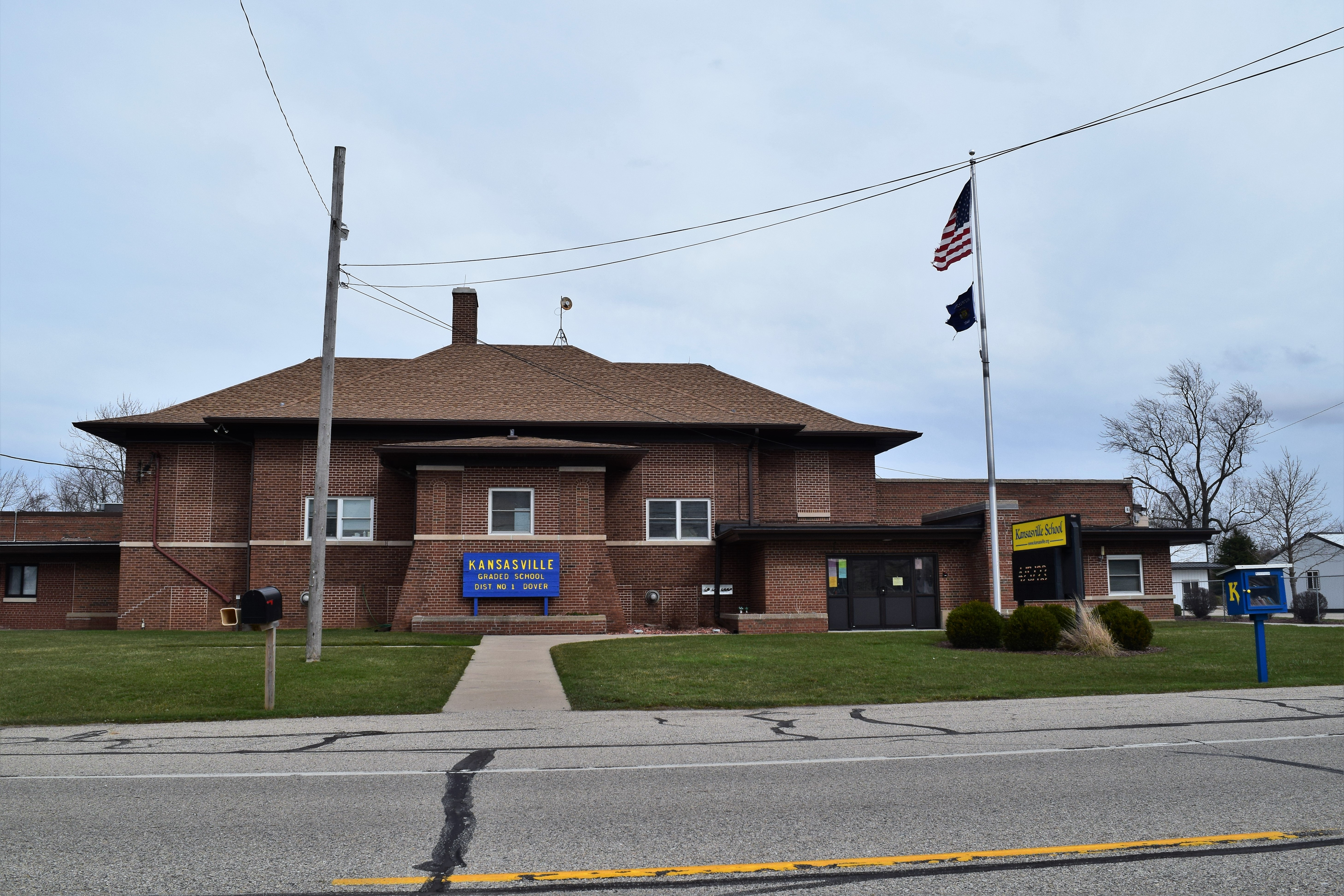
- Kansasville School

- Location within the state of Wisconsin
- Coordinates: 42°41′6″N 88°6′36″W
- Country: United States
- State: Wisconsin
- County: Racine
- Time zone: UTC-6 (Central (CST))
  - Summer (DST): UTC-5 (CDT)
- ZIP Code: 53139
- Area code: 262

Kansasville is an unincorporated community in Racine County, Wisconsin, United States. The area is a part of the Town of Dover. The area has also been referred to as Brighton or Eagle Lake.

== Etymology ==
The origin of the name of the area is uncertain; some sources claim it was named after the Kansas-Nebraska Act, while others claim it was named in honor of area settlers from Kansas. Another belief is that it was named after the railroad system in town which used to operate from Wisconsin to Kansas.

== Education ==
The community is served by the Dover School District, a district with only one school, Kansasville Grade School. After grade school, which covers Kindergarten to eighth grade, students are served by Union Grove Union High School, the sole school in the Union Grove Union High School District, or by Burlington High School, in the Burlington School District.

== Transportation ==
Kansasville was a stop on the Racine & Southwestern branch line of the Chicago, Milwaukee, St. Paul and Pacific Railroad, better known as the Milwaukee Road. In its 1980 bankruptcy, the Milwaukee Road disposed of the Southwestern Line. Today the line from Sturtevant through Union Grove to Kansasville is no longer operated by CP Rail. As a matter of fact, the rails were removed some years ago. And there are plans to make this part into bike trails like what is west of Kansasville to Burlington and beyond there.

== Recreation ==
Recreation areas in Kansasville include the Eagle Lake Park, and the Richard Bong State Recreation Area, where the annual Wolf Lake Run/Hike is held.
