= Wisconsin Highway 188 =

State highway in Wisconsin, United States

State Trunk Highway 188
- WIS 188 highlighted in red

Route information
- Maintained by WisDOT
- Length: 11.88 mi (19.12 km)

Major junctions
- South end: US 12 in Sauk City
- North end: WIS 113 in Merrimac

Location
- Country: United States
- State: Wisconsin
- Counties: Dane, Columbia

Highway system
- Wisconsin State Trunk Highway System; Interstate; US; State; Scenic; Rustic
← WIS 187	→ WIS 189

State Trunk Highway 188 (often called Highway 188, STH-188 or WIS 188) is a 11.88-mile (19.12 km) state highway in Dane and Columbia counties in south–central Wisconsin, United States, that runs north–south from near Sauk City to near Merrimac.

== Route description ==
WIS 188 starts in rural Dane County across the Wisconsin River from Sauk City. The highway runs northward through farm fields on the east side of the river, crosses into Columbia County, and heads to an intersection with WIS 60 east of Prairie du Sac. The two highways run concurrently to the northeast for about 1.5 miles (2.4 km) before WIS 188 separates and turns northward again. Near Lake Wisconsin, the highway turns east and then back north before sticking to an eastward course along a bend in the river. At the intersection with WIS 113 near the Merrimac Ferry, WIS 188 terminates.

== History ==
Around 1942, the routing of WIS 78 was shifted to the east side of the Wisconsin River between Sauk City and the Merrimac Ferry. later, in 1947, that highway was moved back to its previous routing, and the highway on the east side of the river was rechristened WIS 188. The route of WIS 188 has remained unchanged since.

== Major intersections ==
County	Location	mi	km	Destinations	Notes
Dane	Town of Roxbury	0.00	0.00	US 12 – Sauk City, Madison	
Columbia	Town of West Point			WIS 60 west – Prairie du Sac	Western end of WIS 60 overlap
Columbia	Town of West Point			WIS 60 east – Lodi	Eastern end of WIS 60 overlap
Columbia	Town of West Point	11.88	19.12	WIS 113 – Merrimac Ferry, Lodi	
1.000 mi = 1.609 km; 1.000 km = 0.621 mi: Concurrency terminus
