= Gibraltar Rock State Natural Area =

Natural area in southern Wisconsin, United States

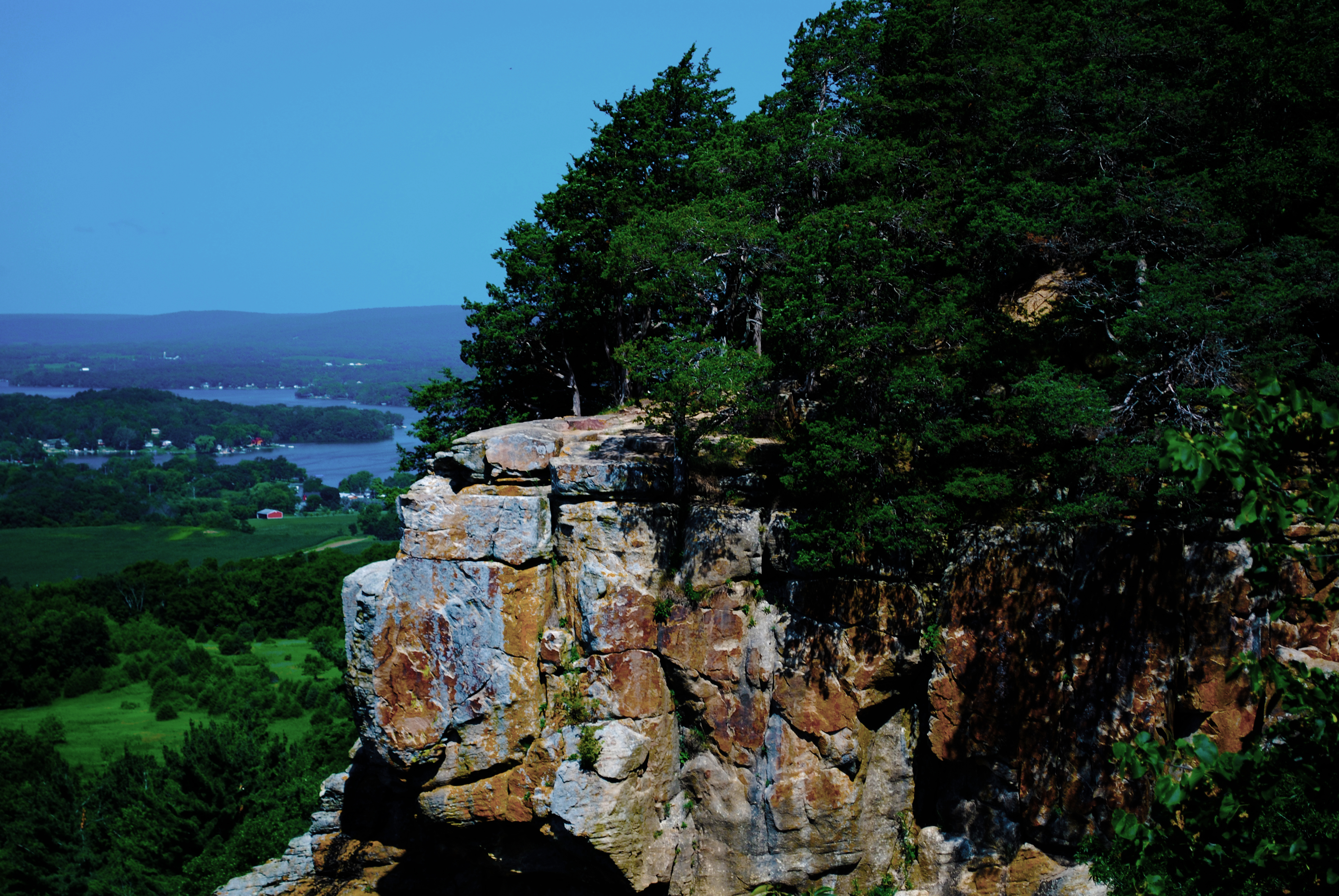

- Location within Wisconsin
- Type: Public, State
- Location: Lodi, Wisconsin
- Coordinates: 43°20′56″N 89°36′02″W
- Area: 68 acres (28 ha)
- Created: 1969
- Operator: Wisconsin Department of Natural Resources
- Visitors: 73

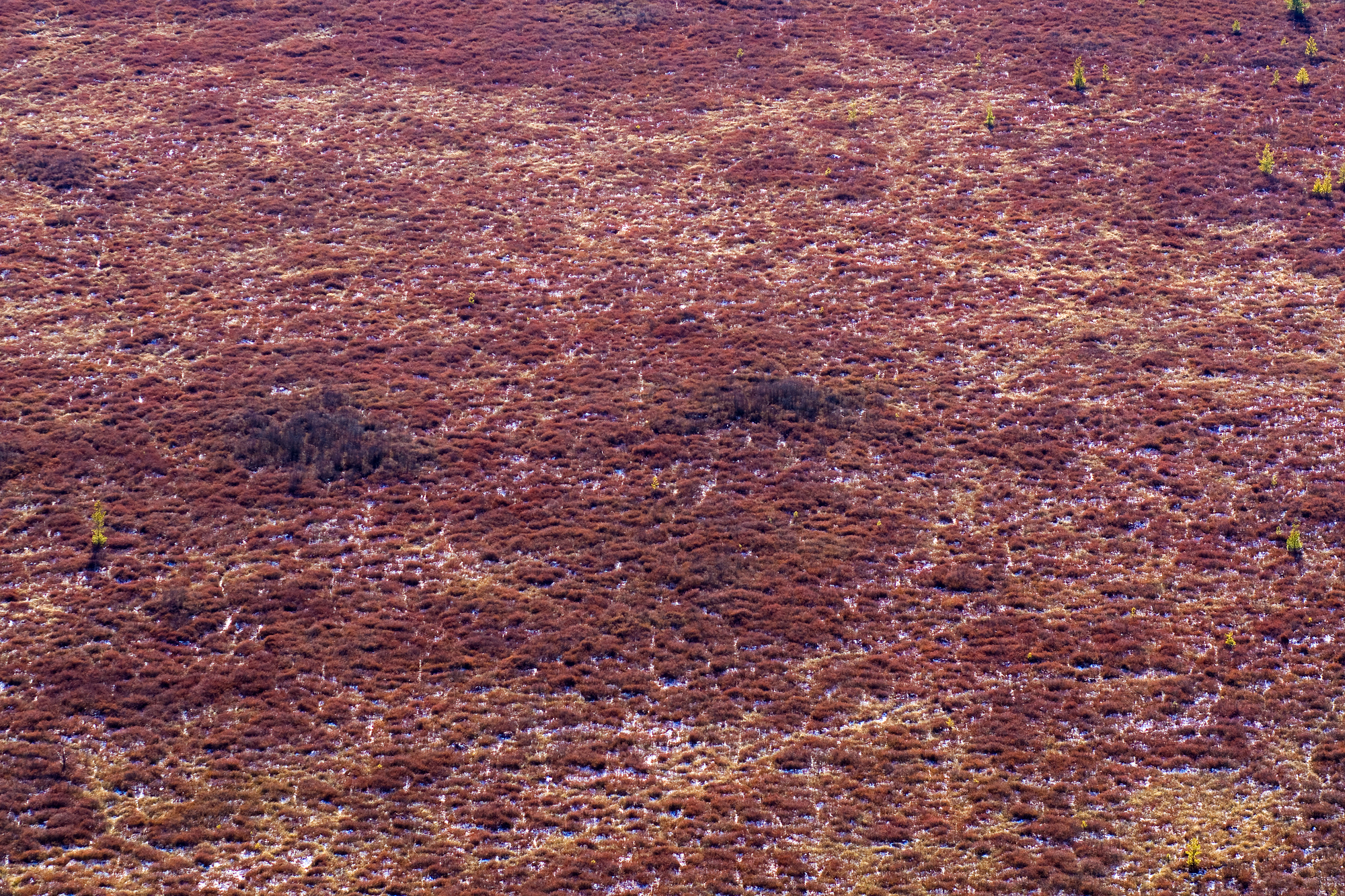
A winter photo of a leather leaf bog from Gibraltar Rock State Natural Area in Wisconsin.

Gibraltar Rock State Natural Area is a natural area in southern Wisconsin, United States, which is 68 acres (28 ha) in size, and is located along the 1,000-mile-long (1,600 km) Ice Age Trail.

== Location ==
Located in Columbia County, Wisconsin, Gibraltar Rock State Natural Area is 68 acres (28 ha) in size. The Wisconsin River Valley and Lake Wisconsin are located within view of the higher-elevation points in the natural area. The Gibraltar Rock State Natural Area is located along the Ice Age Trail, which is a thousand miles long. It is located 1.2 miles (1.9 km) from the intersection of Highway 113 and County Highway V in the town of West Point. Wisconsin County Road V runs past the area, with a parking lot located off the road that allows access to it. From there, a walking trail leads off to gain access to Gibraltar Rock.

== History ==
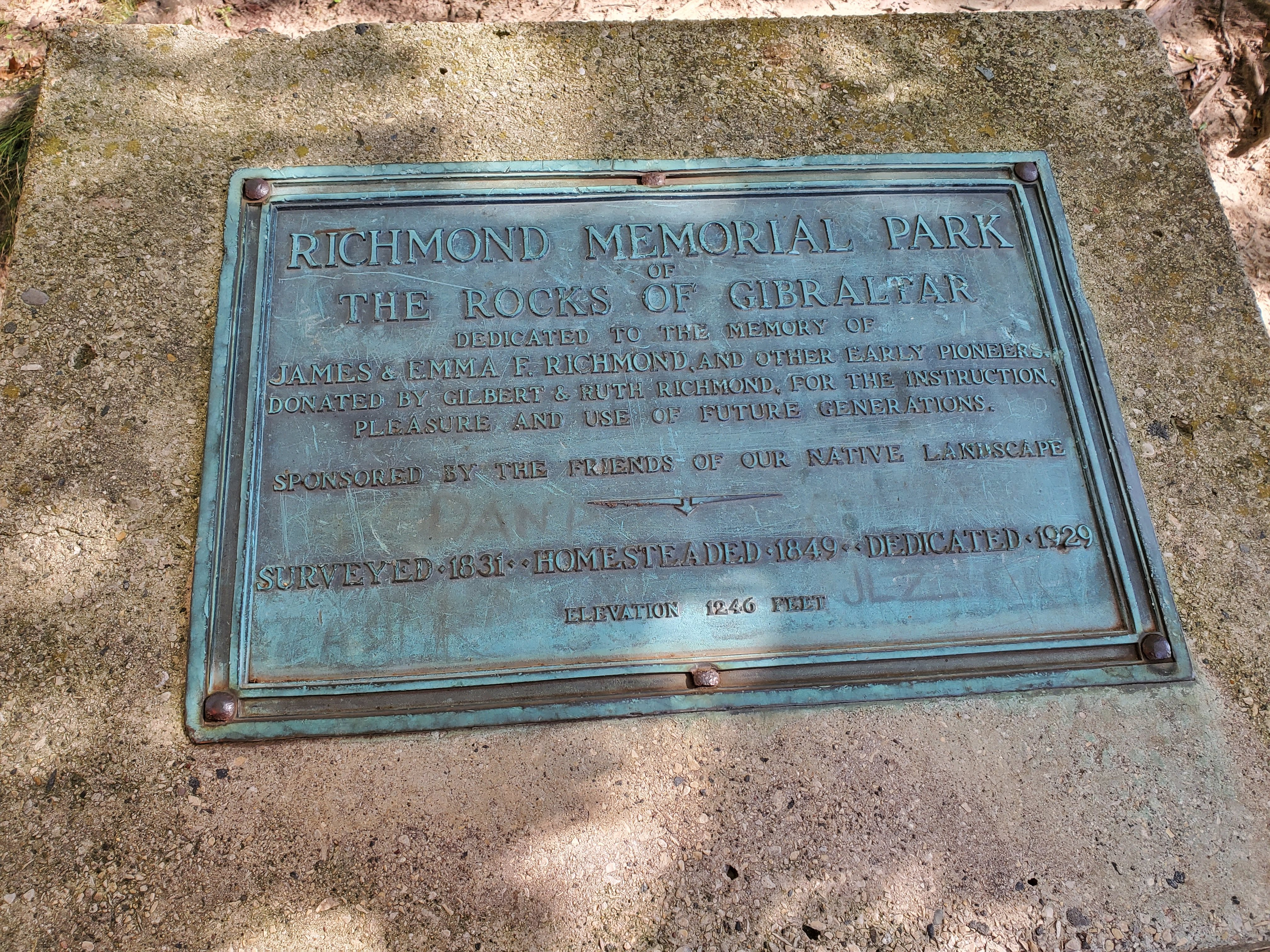
A dedication plaque from the Richmond family, c. 1929

Early on, the Van Ness family owned the land and had a house on the property. Other early families living in the area includes the Richmond family. During the 1920s, Wisconsin landscape architect Jens Jensen started efforts to protect the area. Forming a group at the University of Wisconsin–Madison in 1920, the group was able to acquire the land in 1927. They named the area Richmond Park. The Gibraltar Rock State Natural Area became a Wisconsin-designated natural area in 1969. It was originally owned by the county until 2007, when they transferred ownership to the Wisconsin Department of Natural Resources (WDNR). A celebration was held following the transfer of ownership.

== Background ==
The Wisconsin Department of Natural Resources manages the Gibraltar Rock State Natural Area. Howard Van Ness made several paintings depicting the area prior to its designation as a state natural area. Friends of Gibraltar Rock exists and does "biological indexing of the flora and fauna in the area." The views from the natural area are a major tourist draw. The 1.4-mile (2.3 km) track for the area does not have wheelchair access. People are not allowed to climb the rocks in the park, though this has not always been the case.

== Geology ==
The natural area is located on the outer part of the Magnesian Escarpment/Black River Escarpment, with the soil for the area being glaciated sandy loams, which sit on top of the Galena-Platteville dolomite cap and St. Peter sandstone. Inside the natural area is a 200-foot-tall (61 m) flat-topped butte called "Gibraltar Rock." It sits 1,246 feet (380 m) above sea level and is the highest point in Columbia County. There is a 0.75-mile-long (1.2 km) trail leading up to the Rock.

== Wildlife and fauna ==
Cliff goldenrod, columbine, ferns, pale corydalis and red cedar, little blue-stem, side oats grama, prairie drop-seed, blue-eyed grass, bird's foot violet, bergamot, pasque flower, leadplant, aster, whorled milkweed, and prairie smoke are located within the natural area.
