= Wisconsin Highway 78 =

Highway in Wisconsin

State Trunk Highway 78
- WIS 78 highlighted in red

Route information
- Maintained by WisDOT
- Length: 92.83 mi (149.40 km)

Major junctions
- South end: IL 78 in Gratiot
- US 18 / US 151 in Mount Horeb; US 14 in Black Earth; US 14 / WIS 19 in Mazomanie; US 12 / WIS 60 in Sauk City
- North end: I-39 / I-90 / I-94 in Portage

Location
- Country: United States
- State: Wisconsin
- Counties: Lafayette, Iowa, Green, Dane, Sauk, Columbia

Highway system
- Wisconsin State Trunk Highway System; Interstate; US; State; Scenic; Rustic
← WIS 77	→ WIS 79

State Trunk Highway 78 (often called Highway 78, STH-78 or WIS 78) is a state highway in the U.S. state of Wisconsin. It runs north–south in south central Wisconsin from the Illinois border near Gratiot to Portage.

== Route description ==
WIS 78 begins at the Illinois state line, continued from Illinois Route 78 (IL 78). It enters Gratiot, where it merges with WIS 11 and leaves Gratiot. WIS 78 turns north, and runs concurrently with WIS 81 in Argyle before turning to go north in the Driftless Area. WIS 78 passes through Blanchardville. The highway runs concurrently with WIS 39 for less than a quarter of a mile (0.4 km) before the two highways part ways, and WIS 78 passes through Daleyville and enters Mount Horeb, crosses US 18/US 151, and meets WIS 92 at its western terminus.

WIS 78 continues north out of Mount Horeb through the Driftless Area. It enters Black Earth and merges with US 14 west and the routes run concurrently, leaving Black Earth. WIS 78 turns north. WIS 19 begins at this intersection and the two routes run concurrently for a mile, before WIS 19 turns to go east. WIS 78 runs parallel to the Wisconsin and Southern Railroad for several miles.

The highway merges with US 12 and crosses the Wisconsin River, entering Sauk City before it turns to go north, now running concurrently with WIS 60. WIS 60 turns to go east and WIS 78 continues out of Sauk City, paralleling the Wisconsin River for several miles. It merges with WIS 113, creating a wrong-way concurrency with WIS 113 south and WIS 78 north, and vice-versa. In Merrimac, WIS 113 turns to cross Lake Wisconsin with the Merrimac Ferry. The route continues for 12 miles (19 km) before ending at an interchange with Interstate 39 (I-39) and I-90/I-94. At the interchange, the roadway continues as I-39.

== History ==
In the 1920s, WIS 78 was originally located on the Door County Peninsula on what is now WIS 57.

In 1963, the segment of WIS 78 from the new I-90/I-94 freeway interchange south of Portage northerly to WIS 33 was improved to a four-lane divided facility. A year later, this four-lane divided highway (and the WIS 78 designation with it) was extended northerly across the Wisconsin River then bypassing Portage to the west before merging into the existing two-lane route of US 51 north of the city. The entire four-lane divided portion of WIS 78 from I-90/I-94 northerly to US 51 was shown as a full freeway with interchange beginning with the 1966 official state highway map, so it can be assumed the conversion to freeway occurred about this time (c.1965). In more recent decades, the short segment of WIS 78 freeway was the only portion of the route from I-90/I-94 at Portage northerly past Wausau that was not signed as part of US 51, although signs along the route did indicate "To US 51". Then in 1996, US 51 from Rothschild (south of Wausau) southerly to Portage was concurrently designated as I-39 and to connect this new Interstate route with nearby I-90/I-94, the entire WIS 78 freeway from US 51 north of Portage to I-90/I-94 was redesignated as part of I-39, with WIS -78 losing approximately eight miles (13 km) of length in the process.

== Major intersections ==
County	Location	mi	km	Destinations	Notes
Lafayette	Town of Gratiot	0.0	0.0	IL 78 south – Warren	Continuation into Illinois
Lafayette	Gratiot	5.8	9.3	WIS 11 west – Shullsburg	Western end of WIS 11 concurrency
Lafayette	Gratiot	6.2	10.0	WIS 11 east – Monroe	Eastern end of WIS 11 concurrency
Lafayette	Argyle	20.1	32.3	WIS 81 west – Darlington	Western end of WIS 81 concurrency
Lafayette	Argyle	20.4	32.8	WIS 81 east – Monroe	Eastern end of WIS 81 concurrency
Iowa	No major junctions				
Green	Town of York	32.5	52.3	WIS 39 west – Mineral Point	Western end of WIS 39 concurrency
Green	Town of York	32.7	52.6	WIS 39 east – New Glarus	Eastern end of WIS 39 concurrency
Dane	Mount Horeb	45.7	73.5	US 18 / US 151 – Madison, Dodgeville Bus. US 18 east / Bus. US 151 east	US 151 exit 65; southern end of Business US 18 / Business US 151 concurrency
Dane	Mount Horeb	47.5	76.4	Bus. US 18 east / Bus. US 151 north / CTH-ID (Springdale Street) / WIS 92 south (8th Street)	Roundabout; northern end of Business US 18 / Business US 151 concurrency
Dane	Black Earth	57.6	92.7	US 14 east – Madison	Southern end of US 14 concurrency
Dane	Mazomanie	59.9	96.4	US 14 west / WIS 19 north – Spring Green	Northern end of US 14 concurrency; southern end of WIS 19 concurrency
Dane	Town of Mazomanie	61.3	98.7	WIS 19 east – Waunakee	Northern end of WIS 19 concurrency
Dane	Town of Roxbury	67.8	109.1	US 12 east – Madison	Eastern end of US 12 concurrency
Sauk	Sauk City	68.4	110.1	US 12 west / WIS 60 west (Phillips Boulevard)	Western end of US 12 concurrency; southern end of WIS 60 concurrency
Sauk	Prairie du Sac	70.0	112.7	WIS 60 east (Prairie Street)	Northern end of WIS 60 concurrency
Sauk	Town of Merrimac	77.3	124.4	WIS 113 north – Baraboo	Western end of WIS 113 concurrency
Sauk	Merrimac	79.9	128.6	WIS 113 south – Merrimac Ferry	Eastern end of WIS 113 concurrency
Columbia	Town of Caledonia	92.83	149.40	I-39 south / I-90 / I-94 – Wisconsin Dells, Madison I-39 north – Portage	Roadway continues as northbound I-39
1.000 mi = 1.609 km; 1.000 km = 0.621 mi: Concurrency terminus
