= Wisconsin Highway 113 =

Highway in Wisconsin

State Trunk Highway 113
- WIS 113 highlighted in red

Route information
- Maintained by WisDOT
- Length: 40.39 mi (65.00 km)

Major junctions
- South end: US 151 in Madison
- North end: WIS 33 in Baraboo

Location
- Country: United States
- State: Wisconsin
- Counties: Dane, Columbia, Sauk

Highway system
- Wisconsin State Trunk Highway System; Interstate; US; State; Scenic; Rustic
← WIS 112	→ WIS 114

State Trunk Highway 113 (often called Highway 113, STH-113 or WIS 113) is a state highway in the U.S. state of Wisconsin. It runs in north–south in south central Wisconsin from Madison to Baraboo, following the Chicago and North Western Railway. The highway uses the Merrimac Ferry, the last ferry in the Wisconsin state highway system, to cross the Wisconsin River at Merrimac. Over the length of the road, it runs through Dane, Columbia, and Sauk counties.

== Route description ==
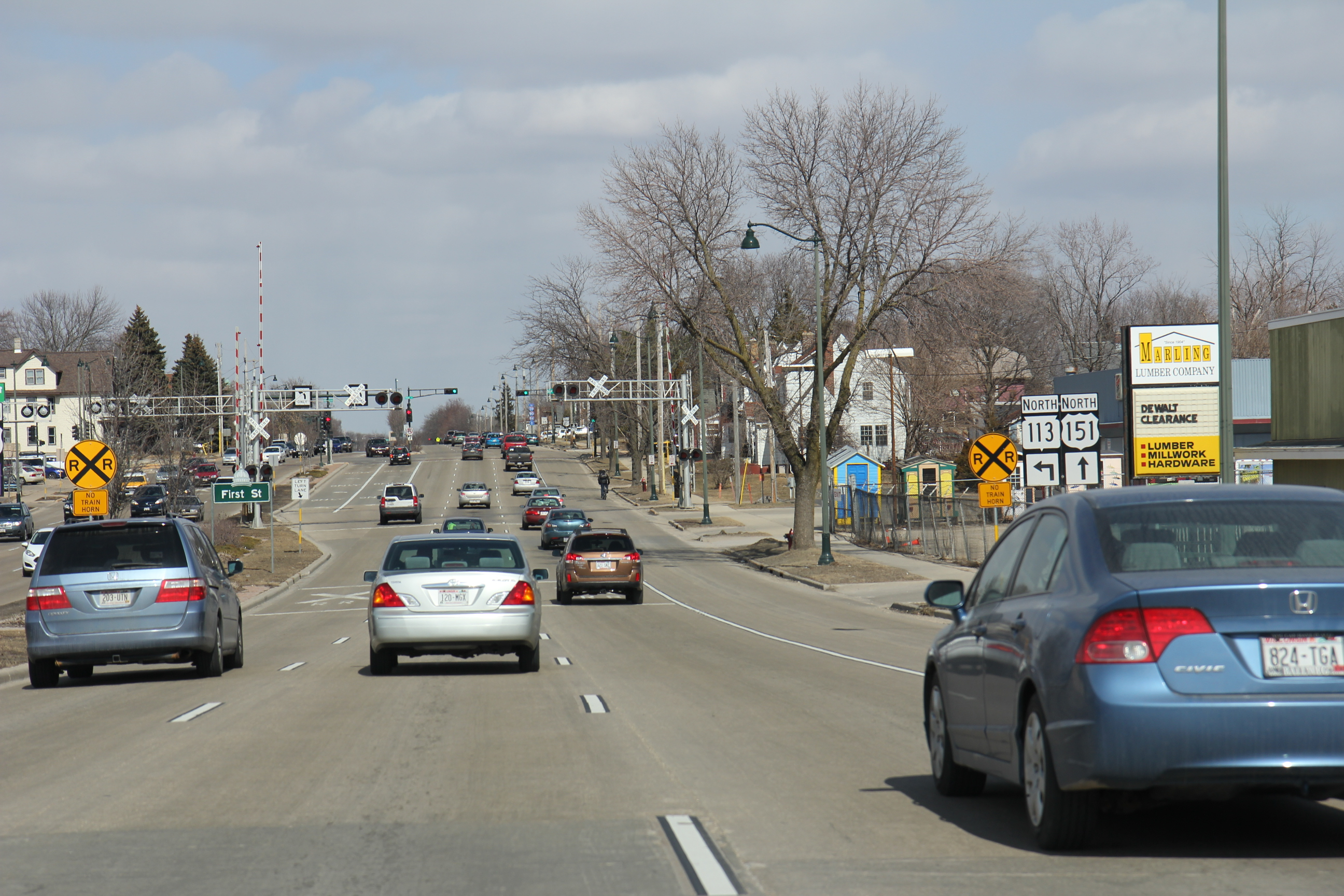
Southern terminus on US 151

WIS 113 starts at an intersection with US Highway 151 in Madison. It runs northward as a divided highway through the northeast side of Madison and around the northern shore of Lake Mendota before crossing the Yahara River and exiting the city into the town of Westport. East of the village of Waunakee, the highway turns westward and runs concurrently along WIS 19 for about two miles (3.2 km) into the village. In the center of the village, WIS 113 turns northward and separates from WIS 19. From there, it turns westward to pass through the village of Dane and turns northward crossing out of Dane County into Columbia County on the way to Lodi.

In Lodi, the highway intersects WIS 60. WIS 113 continues north-northwesterly through the town of Lodi along the shore of Lake Wisconsin. Across the lake from Merrimac, the highway meets the northern end of WIS 188 and turns north into the parking area for the Merrimac Ferry. WIS 113 uses the ferry to cross Lake Wisconsin and into Sauk County.

Immediately north of the ferry crossing, WIS 113 turns westward and runs concurrently with WIS 78 through Merrimac. West of the village, WIS 113 turns northward. The highway crosses the Baraboo River and turns westerly into the city of Baraboo. After passing the Circus World Museum, WIS 113 turns northward. It then runs for about 1/2 mile (0.80 km) before it terminates at an intersection with WIS 33.

== History ==
In 2001, much of the portion between Waunakee and Dane was rerouted. North of Cuba Valley Road, the WIS 113 designation was moved to McChesney Road for two miles (3.2 km) north to CTH-V and westerly on CTH-V for one mile (1.6 km) until it rejoined the old alignment. The routing was moved because the original alignment had several tight curves that had to be navigated at a low speed, whereas the new alignment was entirely straight with no curves. The old roadway was returned to the town of Vienna and was renamed Old 113 Road.

== Major intersections ==
County	Location	mi	km	Destinations	Notes
Dane	Madison	0.00	0.00	US 151 (Washington Avenue)	
Dane	Madison	1.60	2.57	Aberg Avenue to I-39 / I-90 / I-94 / WIS 30	Interchange
Dane	Town of Westport	8.58	13.81	WIS 19 east – Sun Prairie	Eastern end of WIS 19 overlap
Dane	Waunakee	10.88	17.51	WIS 19 west / CTH-Q – Mazomanie, Middleton	Western end of WIS 19 overlap
Columbia	Lodi	22.26	35.82	WIS 60 east – Arlington	
Columbia	Town of West Point	28.52	45.90	WIS 188 south – Sauk City	
Lake Wisconsin		28.61	46.04	Merrimac Ferry	
Sauk	Merrimac	28.77	46.30	WIS 78 north – Portage	Eastern end of WIS 78 overlap
Sauk	Town of Merrimac	31.36	50.47	WIS 78 south – Prairie du Sac	Western end of WIS 78 overlap
Sauk	Baraboo	40.39	65.00	WIS 33 (8th Avenue)	
1.000 mi = 1.609 km; 1.000 km = 0.621 mi: Concurrency terminus
