= Wisconsin Highway 60 =

Highway in Wisconsin

State Trunk Highway 60
- WIS 60 highlighted in red

Route information
- Maintained by WisDOT
- Length: 185.08 mi (297.86 km)

Major junctions
- West end: US 18 in Prairie du Chien
- US 18 in Bridgeport; US 61 in Boscobel; US 14 in Gotham; US 14 / WIS 23 in Spring Green; US 12 / WIS 78 in Sauk City; I-39 / I-90 / I-94 in Lodi; US 51 / WIS 22 in Arlington; US 151 in Columbus; I-41 / US 41 in Slinger; US 45 in Jackson
- East end: I-43 / WIS 32 / WIS 57 / LMCT in Grafton

Location
- Country: United States
- State: Wisconsin
- Counties: Crawford, Richland, Sauk, Columbia, Dodge, Washington, Ozaukee

Highway system
- Wisconsin State Trunk Highway System; Interstate; US; State; Scenic; Rustic
← WIS 59	→ US 61

State Trunk Highway 60, often called Highway 60, STH-60 or WIS 60, is a state highway in the U.S. state of Wisconsin. It runs east–west in southern Wisconsin from Prairie du Chien on the Mississippi River at the Iowa state line to the village of Grafton near Lake Michigan.

== Route description ==
=== Iowa state line to Sauk Prairie ===
WIS 60 begins at the Marquette–Joliet Bridge above the Mississippi River. Since US Highway 18 (US 18) and WIS 60 share the same bridge, both routes form a concurrency. At the eastern approach, the concurrency briefly becomes a one-way pair before turning south. For eastbound traffic, they utilize Iowa Street; for westbound traffic, they utilize Wisconsin Street. Before turning south on Main Street, they intersect WIS 27. After traveling south, they then briefly curve east just north of the Prairie du Chien Municipal Airport. Then, they travel southeastward via WIS 35 and the Great River Road. In Bridgeport, WIS 60 leaves the concurrency, continuing eastward.

At this point, WIS 60 closely parallels the north side of the Wisconsin River. It then passes through Wauzeka, intersects WIS 131, passes through Boydtown, and then Easter Rock. At Easter Rock, WIS 60 runs concurrently with US 61 for more than one mile (1.6 km). After leaving US 61, it passes through Westport, Sand Prairie, and Port Andrew. It then intersects WIS 193 south of Balmoral and WIS 80 north of Muscoda. Starting at Gotham, WIS 60 begins to run concurrently with US 14. At Lone Rock, WIS 130 travels eastward along the concurrency for 2/3 mile (1.1 km). WIS 130 then leaves the concurrency and then joins WIS 133. Near Spring Green, WIS 23 briefly joins the concurrency. After that, WIS 60 branches off eastward while the others are going south/southeastward. WIS 60 continues to meander north of the Wisconsin River. West of Sauk City, WIS 60 runs concurrently with US 12 all the way towards downtown. In downtown Sauk City, WIS 60 turns northward along the west side of the river. As a result, it leaves US 12 while joins WIS 78. In Prairie du Sac, WIS 60 turns east, leaving WIS 78, and then crossing over the Wisconsin River.

=== Sauk Prairie to Grafton ===
After crossing the Wisconsin River, WIS 60 then meets WIS 188. Both routes then run concurrently eastward for around 1.3 miles (2.1 km). After WIS 188 leaves WIS 60, WIS 60 continues eastward. This time, WIS 60 no longer parallels the Wisconsin River. In Lodi, it intersects WIS 113. In the middle of Lodi and Arlington, it meets I-39/I-90/I-94 at a parclo. Between Arlington and Leeds, it runs concurrently with US 51. Shortly after leaving US 51, it then meets WIS 22. In Columbus, WIS 60 begins to run concurrently with WIS 16. They then meet US 151 at a diamond interchange and then intersect WIS 73. Continuing east past Columbus, they then pass through Astico and Lowell. They then meet WIS 26 at a diamond interchange. At this point, WIS 16 turns south to get onto WIS 26.

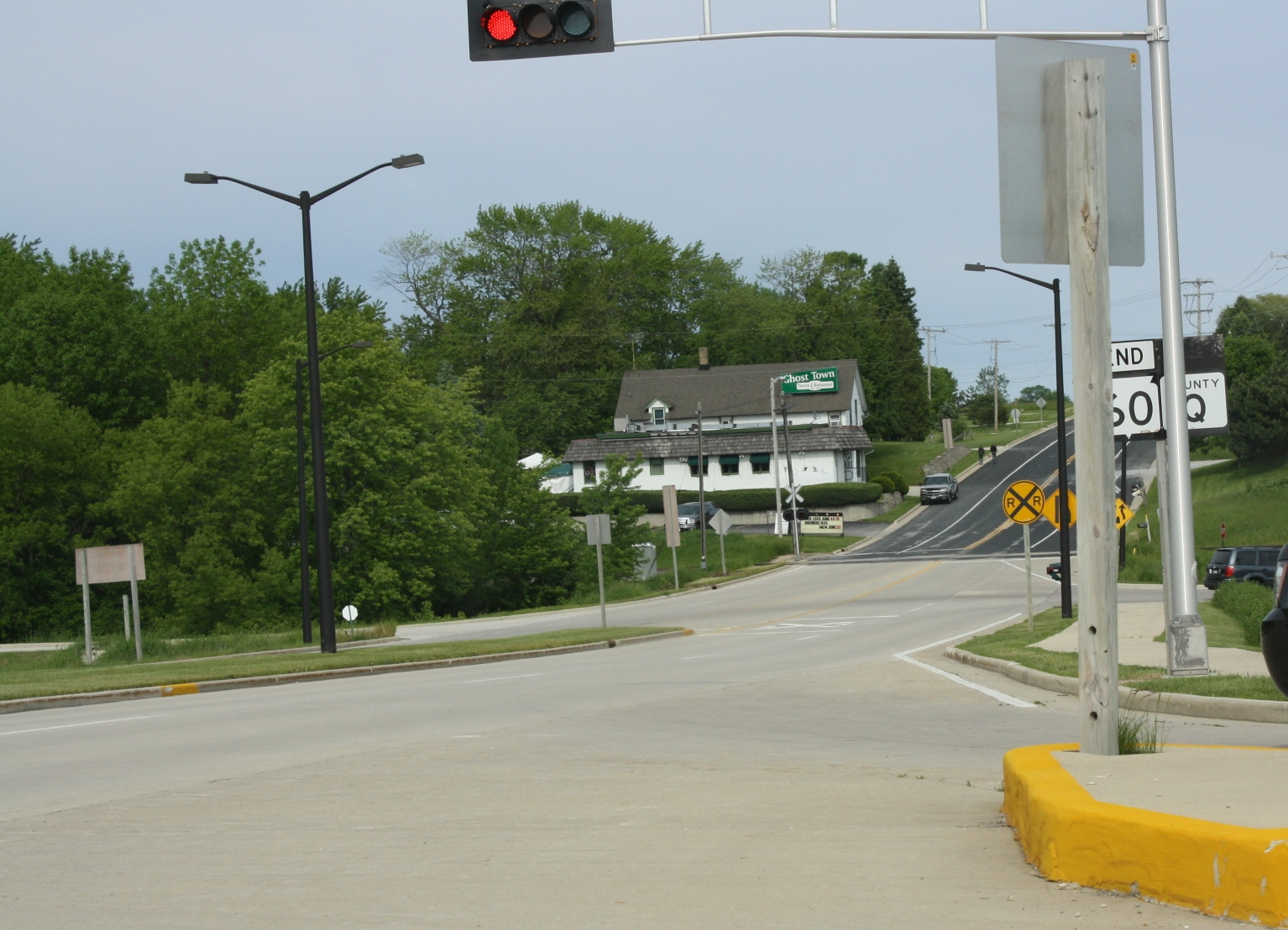
Eastern terminus

WIS 60 then passes through Hustisford, then intersects WIS 67 north of Neosho and WIS 83 in Hartford. In Slinger, it then intersects WIS 175 and then WIS 164. Then, it meets I-41/US 41 at a five-ramp parclo. It then meets US 45 at a diamond interchange in Jackson. Just northwest of Cedarburg, it intersects WIS 181. After passing through downtown Grafton, it then meets I-43/WIS 32/WIS 57 at a diamond interchange. At this point, WIS 60 ends there and continues on as County Trunk Highway Q (CTH-Q).

== Major intersections ==
County	Location	mi	km	Destinations	Notes
Mississippi River		0.00	0.00	US 18 west – Marquette, Charles City	Continuation into Iowa
Mississippi River		0.00	0.00	Marquette–Joliet Bridge; Iowa–Wisconsin state line WIS 60 begins; western end of US 18 concurrency	
Crawford	Prairie du Chien			WIS 27 north – Eastman	Southern terminus of WIS 27
Crawford	Prairie du Chien			WIS 35 north – Lynxville	Western end of WIS 35 concurrency
Crawford	Bridgeport			US 18 east / WIS 35 south – Patch Grove, Madison	Eastern end of US 18 and WIS 35 concurrencys
Crawford	Town of Wauzeka			WIS 131 north – Steuben	
Crawford	Town of Marietta			US 61 south – Boscobel	Western end of US 61 concurrency
Crawford	Town of Marietta			US 61 north – Soldiers Grove, La Crosse	Eastern end of US 61 concurrency
Richland	Town of Eagle			WIS 193 north – Richland Center	
Richland	Town of Eagle			WIS 80 – Muscoda, Richland Center	
Richland	Gotham			US 14 west – Richland Center	Western end of US 14 concurrency
Richland	Lone Rock			WIS 130 north – Bear Valley	Western end of WIS 130 concurrency
Richland	Lone Rock			WIS 130 south / WIS 133 south – Avoca, Dodgeville	Eastern end of WIS 130 concurrency
Sauk	Spring Green			WIS 23 north – Plain, Wisconsin Dells	Western end of WIS 23 concurrency
Sauk	Spring Green			US 14 east / WIS 23 south – Dodgeville, Madison	Eastern end of US 14 and WIS 23 concurrencys
Sauk	Town of Prairie du Sac			US 12 west – Baraboo	Western end of US 12 concurrency
Sauk	Sauk City			US 12 east / WIS 78 south – Madison, Mazomanie	Eastern end of US 12 concurrency; western end of WIS 78 concurrency
Sauk	Prairie du Sac			WIS 78 north – Merrimac	Eastern end of WIS 78 concurrency
Columbia	Town of West Point			WIS 188 south – Roxbury	Western end of WIS 188 concurrency
Columbia	Town of West Point			WIS 188 north – Lake Wisconsin	Eastern end of WIS 188 concurrency
Columbia	Lodi			WIS 113 – Dane, Harmony Grove	
Columbia	Town of Arlington			I-39 / I-90 / I-94 – Wisconsin Dells, Madison	
Columbia	Arlington			US 51 north – Portage	Western end of US 51 concurrency
Columbia	Town of Leeds			US 51 south – Madison	Eastern end of US 51 concurrency
Columbia	Town of Leeds			WIS 22 north – Wyocena	Southern terminus of WIS 22
Columbia	Columbus			WIS 16 west – Fall River	Western end of WIS 16 concurrency
Columbia	Columbus			US 151 – Sun Prairie, Beaver Dam	
Columbia	Columbus			WIS 73 (Ludington Street) to WIS 89	
Dodge	Town of Clyman			WIS 16 east / WIS 26 – Watertown, Juneau	Eastern end of WIS 16 concurrency; interchange
Dodge	Town of Rubicon			WIS 67 – Mayville, Oconomowoc	
Washington	Hartford			WIS 83 (Main Street)	Northern terminus of WIS 83
Washington	Slinger			WIS 175 – Slinger, Menomonee Falls	
Washington	Slinger			WIS 164 south – Sussex, Pewaukee	Northern terminus of WIS 164
Washington	Slinger			I-41 / US 41 – Milwaukee, Fond du Lac	
Washington	Village of Jackson			US 45 – West Bend, Milwaukee	
Ozaukee	Cedarburg			WIS 181 south / CTH-NN west – Cedarburg, West Bend	
Ozaukee	Grafton			I-43 / WIS 32 / WIS 57 / LMCT – Milwaukee, Sheboygan	
1.000 mi = 1.609 km; 1.000 km = 0.621 mi: Concurrency terminus
