= Sauk Prairie School District =

School district in Wisconsin, United States

Address
- 440 13th Street Prairie du Sac, Sauk County, Wisconsin, 53578; United States

District information
- Type: Public
- Grades: Pre-K/K–12
- Superintendent: Jeff Wright
- School board: Seven members
- Chair of the board: Jim Isaacson
- Schools: Elementary four, Middle one, High one
- NCES District ID: 5513410

Students and staff
- Students: 2,686 (2023-2024)

Other information
- Website: www.saukprairieschools.org

The Sauk Prairie School District is a school district based in Sauk Prairie, Wisconsin. It serves the villages of Sauk City, Prairie du Sac, Merrimac, and the surrounding rural area.

The district administers four elementary schools, one middle school, and one high school, for a total of six schools.

== Schools ==
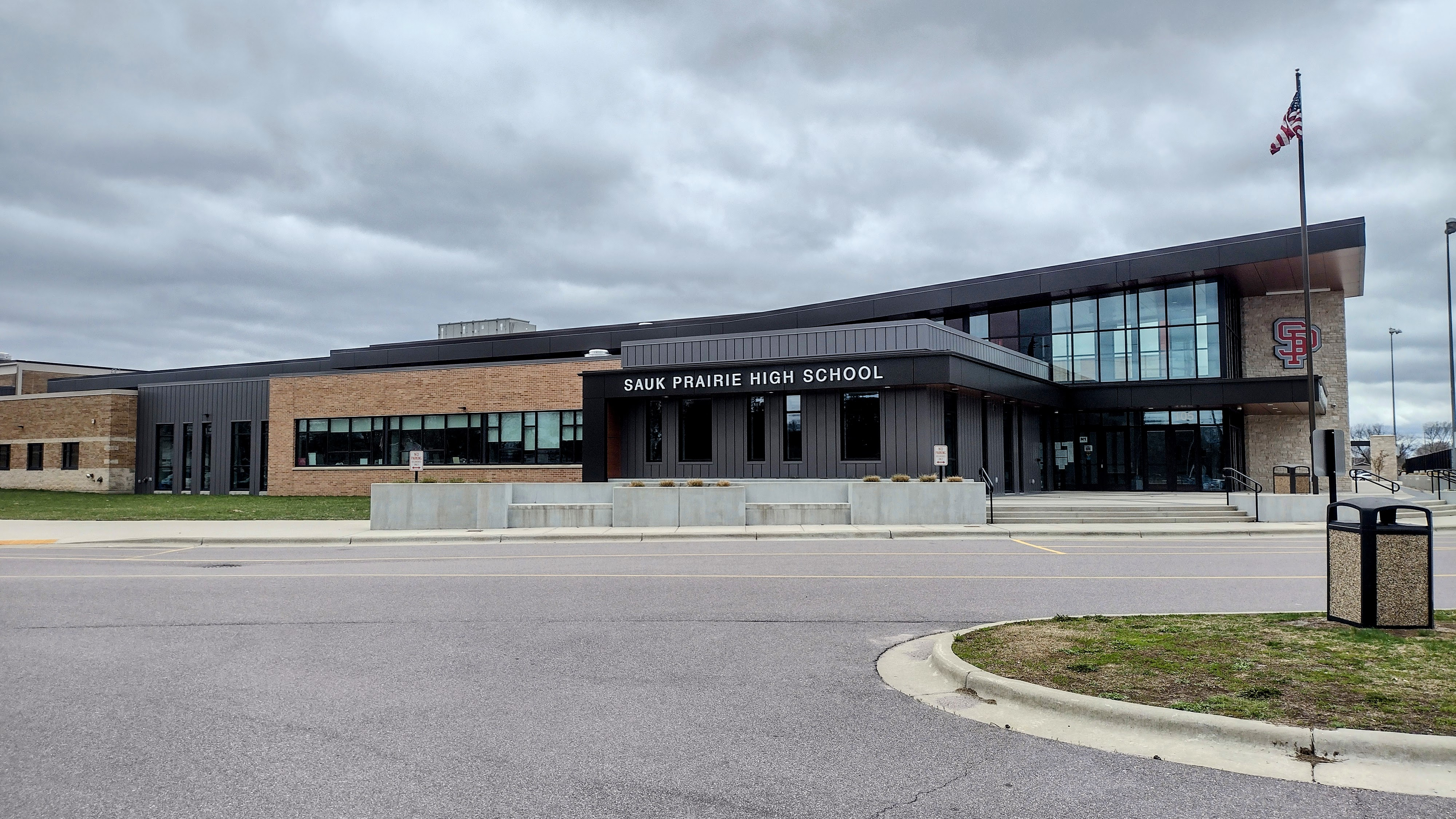
Sauk Prairie High School in 2025

School	Year built	Description
Sauk Prairie High School	1965	Built in 1965 and extensively renovated in 2020. The building includes the "River Arts Center", a community theater.
Sauk Prairie Middle School	1968	
Tower Rock Elementary School		
Merrimac Community School		
Grand Avenue Elementary School		
Bridges Elementary School	2014	

== Former schools ==
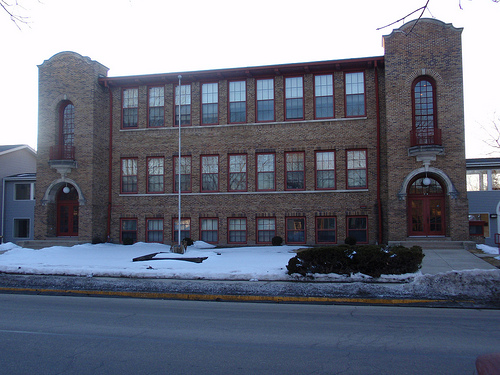
Old Sauk City High School building

- Sauk City High School, closed in 1970s and building remains extant.
- Spruce Street Elementary School, closed in 2014.

== Leadership ==
The current superintendent is Jeff Wright, who accepted the position on September 1, 2019. Previously he was the assistant superintendent since 2012.

=== Board of education ===
The district is run by a seven-member school board. Members are elected in April for staggered three-year terms. Board seats are divided geographically to represent both the rural area of the district and the part inside the villages of Sauk Prairie.

Position	Name	Area Represents	Assumed office	Term ends	Electoral history	Refs
President	Jim Isaacson	Village of Merrimac, Towns of Caledonia, Merrimac, & West Point		2027		
Vice President	John Hutchins	Towns of Franklin, Honey Creek, & Troy		2027		
Board Clerk	Richard Talmage	Towns of Prairie du Sac & Sumpter		2025		
Treasurer	Amy Alt	Towns of Berry, Dane, Mazomanie, Roxbury, & Springfield		2026		
Director	Vacant	Villages of Sauk Prairie	2025	2027	Tyler Erickson was reelected in 2025, but resigned shortly after the election. He served since 2019.	
Director & Deputry Clerk	Holly Walker	Villages of Sauk Prairie		2026		
Director & Deputy Treasurer	Rich Judge	Villages of Sauk Prairie		2027		
