= Wisconsin Highway 59 =

Highway in Wisconsin

State Trunk Highway 59
- WIS 59 highlighted in red

Route information
- Maintained by WisDOT
- Length: 116.21 mi (187.02 km)

Major junctions
- West end: WIS 11 / WIS 81 in Monroe
- US 14 / WIS 213 in Evansville; US 51 in Edgerton; I-39 / I-90 near Newville; US 12 / WIS 89 in Whitewater; I-41 / I-894 / US 41 / US 45 in West Allis; I-43 / I-94 in Milwaukee
- East end: WIS 32 / LMCT in Milwaukee

Location
- Country: United States
- State: Wisconsin
- Counties: Green, Rock, Walworth, Jefferson, Waukesha, Milwaukee

Highway system
- Wisconsin State Trunk Highway System; Interstate; US; State; Scenic; Rustic
← WIS 58	→ WIS 60

State Trunk Highway 59 (often called Highway 59, STH-59 or WIS 59) is a state highway that runs east–west in the southeastern part of the U.S. state of Wisconsin from Milwaukee to Monroe.

== Route description ==
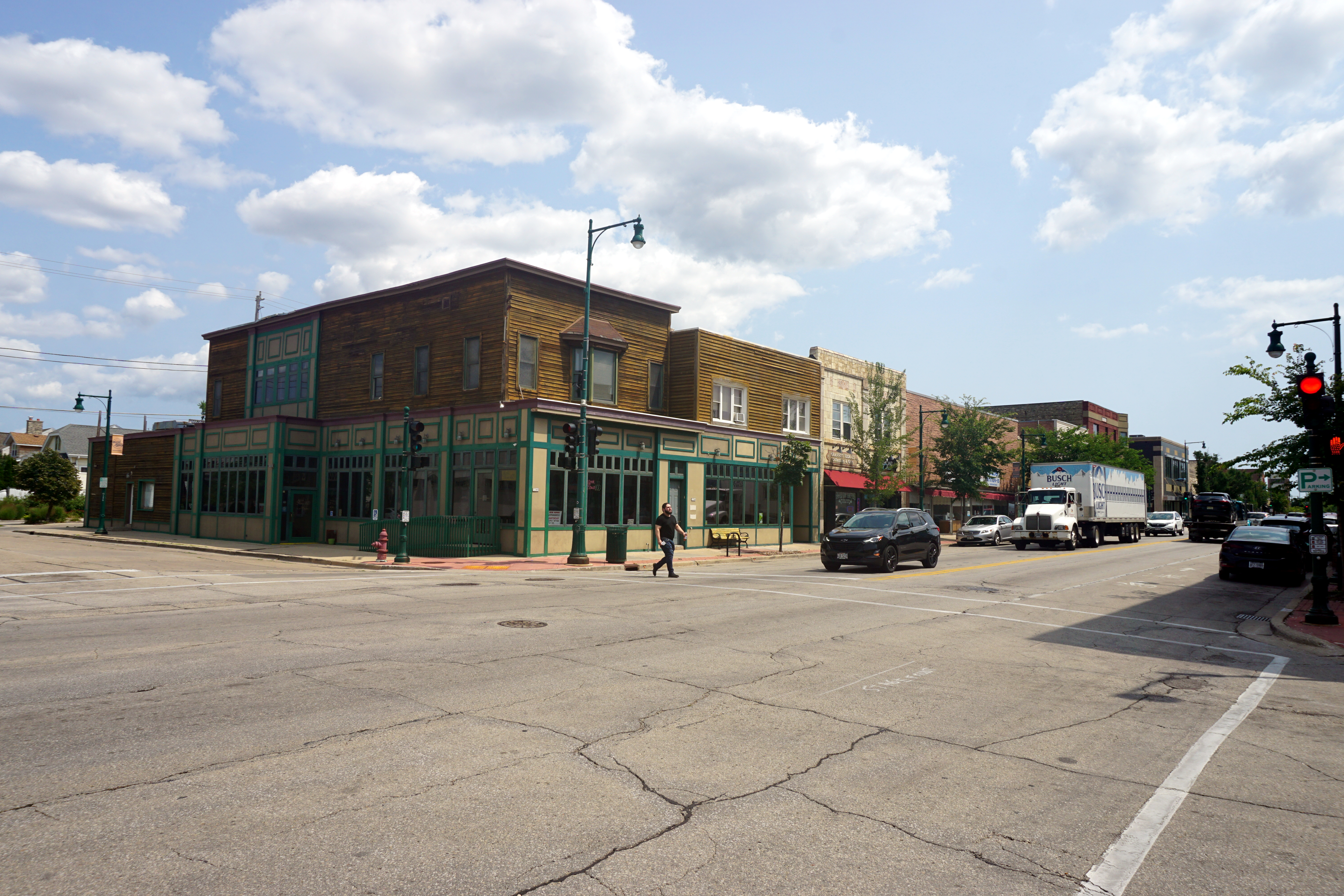
WIS 59 (W. Greenfield Avenue) in West Allis

The highway starts at WIS 11 in Monroe and tracks northeasterly. It then passes through Albany and then runs concurrently with WIS 104 for 1.2 miles (1.9 km) near Magnolia Bluff Park. It then heads east and runs concurrently with WIS 213 for 3.3 miles (5.3 km) until reaching US Highway 14 (US 14) in Evansville, where WIS 213 terminates. WIS 59 remains concurrent with US 14 until reaching Union then heads east through Cooksville and Edgerton, then junctions with Interstate 39/Interstate 90 (I-90/I-90) and then crossing the Rock River near Newville. It then heads southeasterly, passing through Milton and then going east and northeast to Whitewater. The route runs concurrently with US 12 for about two miles (3.2 km), then passes through the north and east sides of Whitewater before continuing east. It then passes through Palmyra, Eagle, and North Prairie before looping south of Waukesha. The eastern and southern portion of the bypass highway around Waukesha (US 18 and WIS 59/WIS 164) is dedicated as the Les Paul Parkway in honor of Les Paul. WIS 59 runs parallel to I-94 entering Milwaukee County, routed along National Avenue and Greenfield Avenue, then terminates at WIS 32 south of downtown Milwaukee.

== Major intersections ==
County	Location	mi	km	Destinations	Notes
Green	Monroe			WIS 11 / WIS 81 – Dubuque, Brodhead	Western terminus
Green	Albany			WIS 104	
Rock	Magnolia			WIS 213 south – Beloit	Southern end of WIS 213 concurrency
Rock	Evansville			US 14 east – Janesville	Southern end of US 14 concurrency; northern terminus of WIS 213
Rock	Town of Union			US 14 west – Madison	Northern end of US 14 concurrency
Rock	Cooksville			WIS 138 north – Stoughton	
Rock	Edgerton			US 51	
Rock	Newville			I-39 / I-90 – Madison, Janesville	
Rock	Milton			WIS 26	
Walworth	Whitewater			US 12 west / WIS 89 south	Western end of US 12 concurrency
Walworth	Whitewater			US 12 east / CTH-P / Bus. US 12 – Elkhorn	Eastern end of US 12 concurrency; eastern end of Bus US 12 concurrency
Walworth	Whitewater			Bus. US 12 west	Western end of Bus US 12 concurrency
Jefferson	Palmyra			WIS 106 north	
Waukesha	Eagle			WIS 67 – Elkhorn, Oconomowoc	
Waukesha	Genesee			WIS 83 – Mukwonago, Genesee Depot	
Waukesha	Waukesha			US 18 west	Western end of US 18 concurrency
Waukesha	Waukesha			WIS 164 south	Southern end of WIS 164 concurrency
Waukesha	Waukesha			US 18 east / WIS 164 north	Northeastern end of US 18/WIS 164 concurrency
Waukesha	New Berlin			CTH-O (Moorland Road)	
Milwaukee	West Allis			WIS 100 (108th Street)	
Milwaukee	West Allis			I-41 / I-894 to I-94	
Milwaukee	West Allis			WIS 181 (84th Street)	
Milwaukee	Milwaukee			To WIS 175 (Miller Parkway)	
Milwaukee	Milwaukee			WIS 57 (Layton Boulevard)	
Milwaukee	Milwaukee			To I-43 / I-94	
Milwaukee	Milwaukee			WIS 38 (6th Street)	
Milwaukee	Milwaukee			WIS 32 / LMCT (1st Street)	Eastern terminus; road continues as National Avenue
1.000 mi = 1.609 km; 1.000 km = 0.621 mi: Concurrency terminus
