= Lake Wisconsin, Wisconsin =

Census-designated place in Wisconsin, United States

- CDP
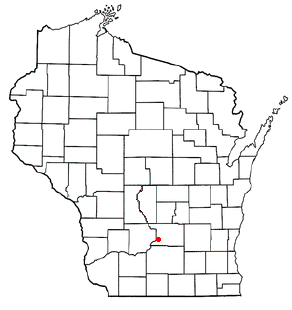
- Location of Lake Wisconsin, Wisconsin
- Coordinates: 43°22′24″N 89°34′32″W
- Country: United States
- State: Wisconsin
- Counties: Columbia, Sauk

Area
  - Total: 21.456 sq mi (55.57 km^{2})
  - Land: 12.134 sq mi (31.43 km^{2})
  - Water: 9.322 sq mi (24.14 km^{2})
- Elevation: 807 ft (246 m)

Population (2020)
  - Total: 4,616
  - Density: 380.4/sq mi (146.9/km^{2})
- Time zone: UTC-6 (Central (CST))
  - Summer (DST): UTC-5 (CDT)
- Area code: 608
- FIPS code: 55-42012
- GNIS feature ID: 1867661

Lake Wisconsin is a census-designated place (CDP) in Columbia and Sauk counties, in the towns of Lodi and Merrimac, in Wisconsin, United States. The population was 4,616 at the 2020 census, up from 4,189 at the 2010 census.

The Columbia County portion of the Lake Wisconsin is part of the Madison, Wisconsin metropolitan area, while the Sauk County portion is part of the Baraboo Micropolitan Statistical Area.

== Geography ==
Lake Wisconsin is located at 43°22′24″N 89°34′32″W (43.373461, -89.575676).

According to the United States Census Bureau, the CDP has a total area of 21.5 square miles (55.6 km^{2}), of which 12.1 square miles (31.4 km^{2}) is land and 9.3 square miles (24.1 km^{2}) (43.45%) is water.

== Demographics ==
As of the census of 2000, there were 3,493 people, 1,419 households, and 1,082 families living in the CDP. The population density was 275.8 people per square mile (106.4/km^{2}). There were 2,116 housing units at an average density of 167/sq mi (64.5/km^{2}). The racial makeup of the CDP was 98.57% White, 0.14% African American, 0.43% Native American, 0.26% Asian, 0.14% from other races, and 0.46% from two or more races. Hispanic or Latino people of any race were 0.54% of the population.

There were 1,419 households, out of which 30.3% had children under the age of 18 living with them, 70.1% were married couples living together, 3.7% had a female householder with no husband present, and 23.7% were non-families. 18.5% of all households were made up of individuals, and 6.4% had someone living alone who was 65 years of age or older. The average household size was 2.46 and the average family size was 2.81.

In the CDP, the population was spread out, with 22.5% under the age of 18, 4.8% from 18 to 24, 30.1% from 25 to 44, 30.8% from 45 to 64, and 11.8% who were 65 years of age or older. The median age was 40 years. For every 100 females, there were 108.7 males. For every 100 females age 18 and over, there were 107.5 males.

The median income for a household in the CDP was $58,906, and the median income for a family was $63,125. Males had a median income of $39,839 versus $28,229 for females. The per capita income for the CDP was $26,657. About 0.4% of families and 1.2% of the population were below the poverty line, including none of those under age 18 and 2% of those age 65 or over.

== Education ==
The portion in Columbia County is divided between Portage Community School District, Poynette School District, Lodi School District, and Sauk Prairie School District. The portion in Sauk County is in Sauk Prairie School District.

== See also ==
- Lake Wisconsin AVA
- List of census-designated places in Wisconsin
