= Harry Aitken =

American film producer (1877–1956)

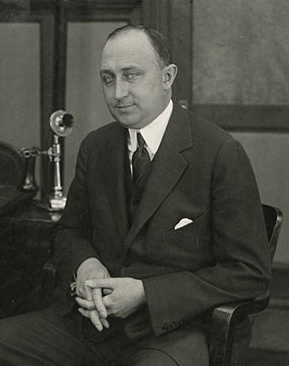
- Aitken circa 1910
- Born: Harry E. Aitken; October 4, 1877; Goerke's Corners, Wisconsin, U.S.
- Died: August 1, 1956 (aged 78); Waukesha, Wisconsin, U.S.
- Burial place: Prairie Home Cemetery
- Occupations: Film producer, executive

Harry E. Aitken (October 4, 1877 – August 1, 1956) was an American film studio executive and producer.

== Life ==
He was born on October 4, 1877. He grew up on a family farm near Goerke's Corners, Wisconsin. The brothers operated Keystone Studios and eventually Harry became a partner in the Mutual Film Company.

Along with his brother Roy Aitken (1882–1978), he helped pioneer the production and distribution of movies during the early silent film era in the United States. In 1906 they founded the Western Film Exchange with John R. Freuler. They moved to California in 1908 and in 1912 founded the Mutual distribution company. Within three years they were distributing movies to 45 towns and cities.

Aitken worked with D. W. Griffith and Charlie Chaplin. He was involved with the Majestic and Reliance studios. With D. W. Griffith he co-founded Epoch Producing Company under the umbrella of which The Birth of a Nation was produced. The profits from that film were used to set up the Triangle Film Corporation in 1915, which was on a triangular plot in Culver City. This produced Intolerance but failed soon after due to over ambition and was sold to Goldwyn.

He returned to in home town of Waukesha, Wisconsin around 1918 and died there on August 1, 1956, and is buried there in Prairie Home Cemetery.

The Wisconsin Historical Society has a collection of his papers.

== Film productions ==
- Home Sweet Home (1914) as writer
- The Surgeon's Experiment (short, 1914)
- The Life of General Villa (1914)
- The Electric Alarm (1915)
- The Birth of a Nation (1915)
- Intolerance (1916)

== Portrayal ==
Aitken is portrayed by Jim Broadbent in the 2003 HBO TV movie And Starring Pancho Villa as Himself.
