= Wisconsin Highway 189 =

Former state highway in Wisconsin, United States

State Trunk Highway 189
- Former WIS 189 highlighted in red

Route information
- Maintained by WisDOT
- Length: 1.4 mi (2.3 km)
- Existed: 1947–by 1969

Major junctions
- West end: WIS 36 / WIS 83 / CTH-D in Rochester
- East end: WIS 20 east of Rochester

Location
- Country: United States
- State: Wisconsin
- Counties: Racine

Highway system
- Wisconsin State Trunk Highway System; Interstate; US; State; Scenic; Rustic
← WIS 188	→ WIS 190

Wisconsin Highway 189 (WIS 189) was a short state highway in Wisconsin. It traveled from WIS 36/WIS 83 in Rochester to WIS 20.

== Route description ==
Starting at its western terminus, WIS 189 traveled eastward from WIS 36/WIS 83. Continuing east, it shortly ended at WIS 20 east of Rochester.

== History ==
In 1947, WIS 189 was formed as a result of WIS 20 being diverted and extended west. It traveled between WIS 36/WIS 83 and WIS 20 at a short distance. During its existence, no significant changes were made. By 1969, the route became decommissioned. Today, the former route is now part of CTH-D.

== Major intersections ==
The entire highway was in Racine County.

Location	mi	km	Destinations	Notes
Rochester	0.0	0.0	WIS 36 / WIS 83 / CTH-D	Western terminus of WIS 189
	1.4	2.3	WIS 20	Eastern terminus of WIS 189
1.000 mi = 1.609 km; 1.000 km = 0.621 mi
