= Durward's Glen =

- U.S. National Register of Historic Places
- U.S. Historic district
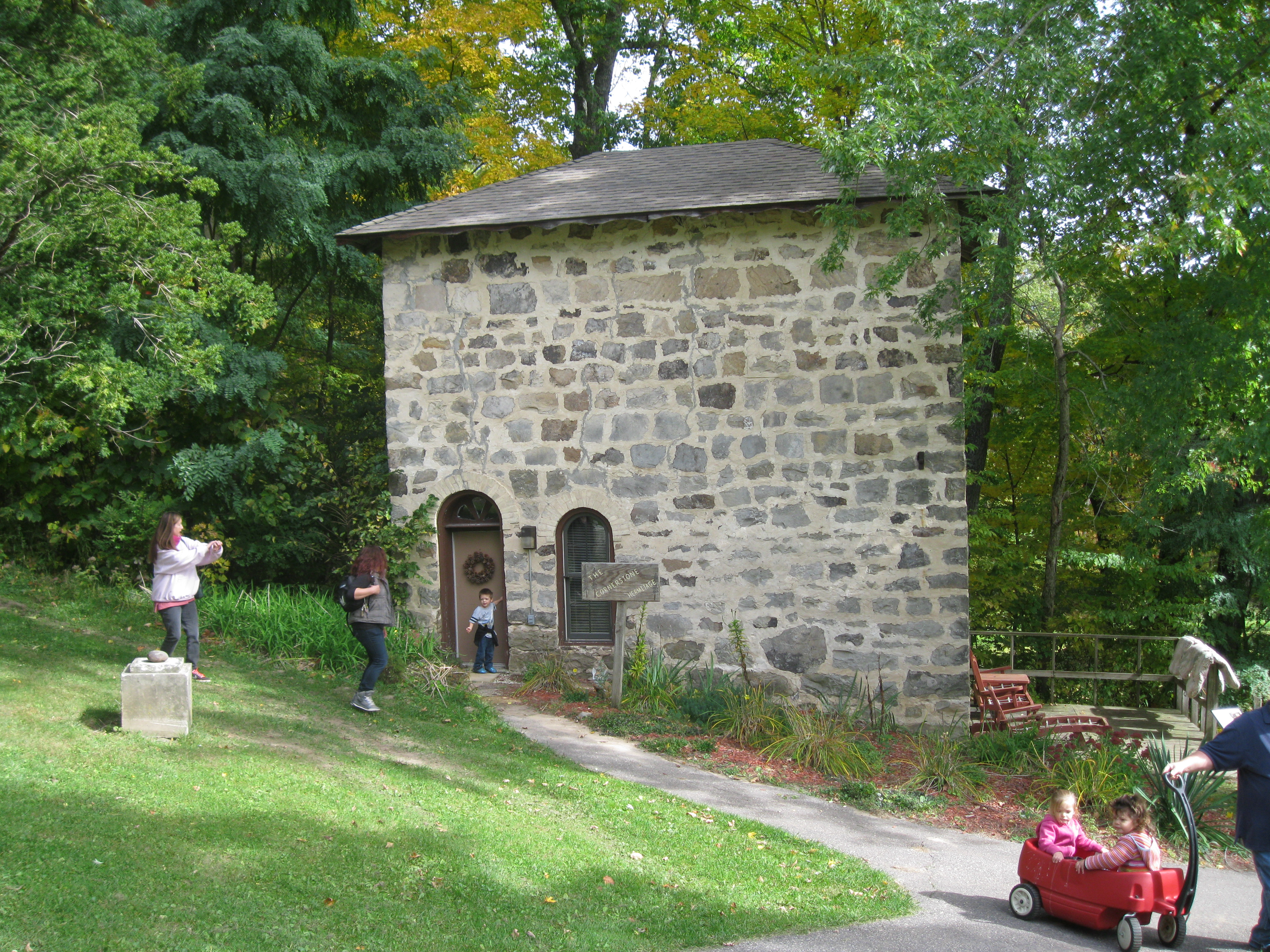
- Durward's art studio

- Location within Wisconsin Location within the United States
- Nearest city: Merrimac, Wisconsin
- Coordinates: 43°26′12″N 89°35′37″W
- Area: 40 acres (16 ha)
- Built: 1862
- Architectural style: Italianate, Gothic Revival
- NRHP reference No.: 78000081
- Added to NRHP: November 7, 1978

Durward's Glen is a historic property located in the town of Caledonia, Columbia County, Wisconsin, northeast of the village of Merrimac. The land encompasses a ravine nestled between steep bluffs, part of the Baraboo Bluffs adjoining the Wisconsin River. Nature trails wind throughout the area.

The 40-acre (16 ha) property includes a church, a grotto, residences, a barn, an outdoor way of the cross, and religious statues, including the Guardian of the Glen statue near where Durward's daughter was born. A small cemetery contains the graves of the Durwards and several of their children. The Durwards' original house burned in 1951.

== History ==
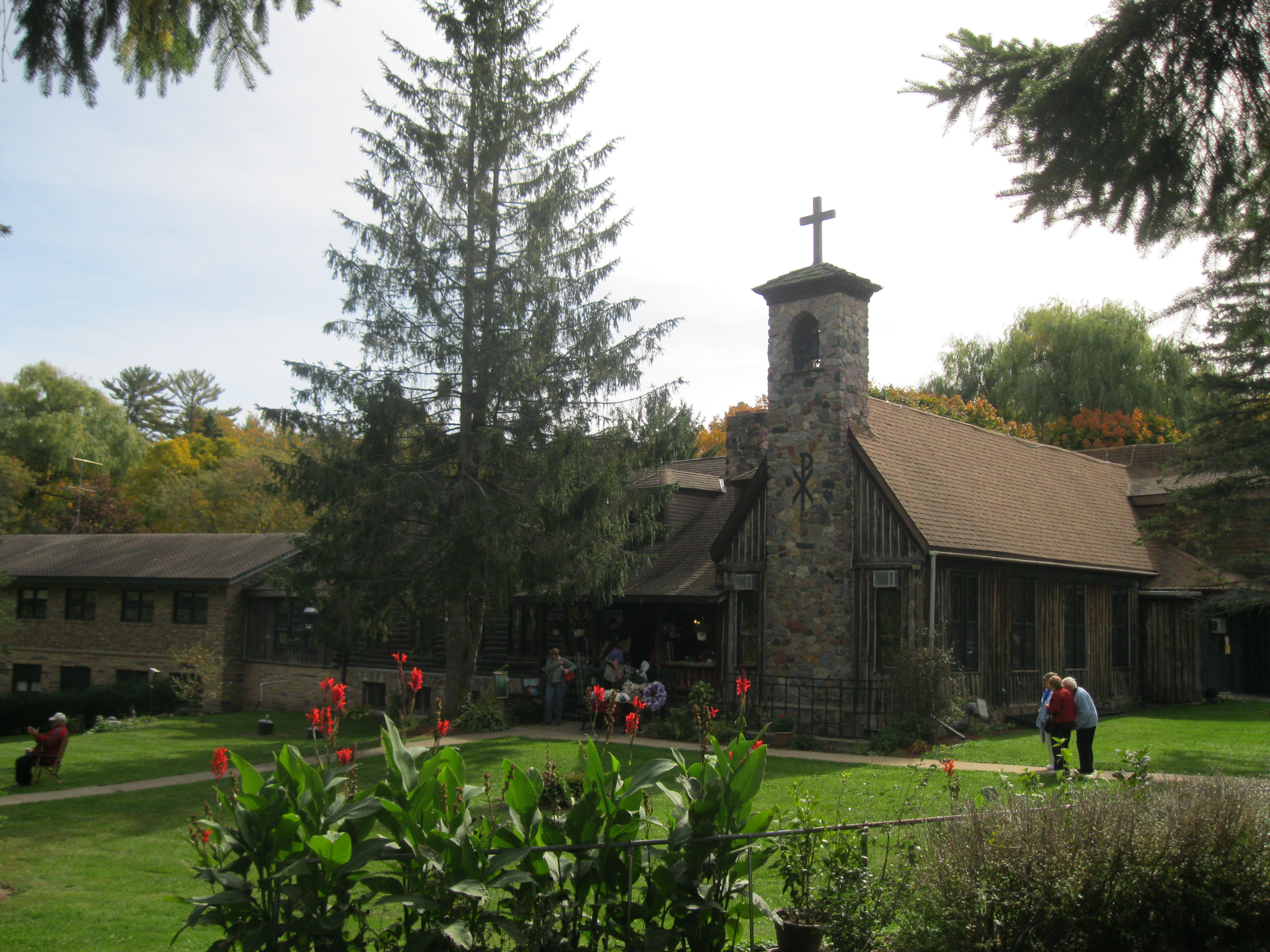
St. Camillus seminary

In 1862 the property became the home of Bernard Durward, a painter and poet, and his family. Durward had been born in Montrose, Scotland, emigrating to the United States in 1842, and finally settling in Wisconsin in 1845. Before moving to the glen, he was a painter in Milwaukee whose compositions included portraits and works with religious themes. Among his portraits were those of local notables, including Solomon Juneau, Byron Kilbourn, and Archbishop John Henni. It was while painting Henni that Durward became interested in Catholicism, converting in 1851. He then became the first teacher of English literature at St. Francis Seminary, where he taught for several years.

The Durwards discovered the site when they were visiting friends in the area. When they fell in love with the glen, they negotiated with the blacksmith who lived there to buy the land. The Durwards called their home "Auld Geordies", but later referred to it simply as "the glen".

The Durwards had six children, five sons and a daughter. Two sons became priests. While living in the glen, they engaged in various artistic endeavors. Mrs. Durward made lace, often for priests' vestments. One son was a religious painter. To supplement their income, they also engaged in truck farming, selling their fruits and vegetables in local markets.

The Durwards constructed a house on top of a knoll on the property. In 1866, the family built a small chapel so that Mrs. Durward did not have to walk so far to church. One of her sons was ordained there. Later they added a studio to the buildings. After the chapel, known as "St. Mary's of the Pines", burned in 1923, it was restored by the Madison council of the Knights of Columbus in the late 1920s.

The Durward family sold the land to the Roman Catholic Order of St. Camillus in 1932. The order established a seminary on the land, where it trained priests beginning in the 1930s. The order's primary building was a 75-foot stone and log novitiate, built entirely by hand. The buildings were expanded in the 1960s to accommodate a conference and retreat center.

The glen was sold to The College of Saint Mary Magdalen in 2007, which owned the land for four years before selling it to Durward's Glen Our Lady of the Rosary Group. The group now uses the property as a retreat center, and for wedding receptions and other group events.

The glen was added to the National Register of Historic Places on November 7, 1978.
