= Wisconsin Highway 181 =

State highway in Wisconsin, United States

State Trunk Highway 181
- WIS 181 highlighted in red

Route information
- Maintained by WisDOT
- Length: 21.44 mi (34.50 km)

Major junctions
- South end: WIS 59 in West Allis
- I-94 in Milwaukee; US 18 in Wauwatosa; US 41 in Milwaukee
- North end: WIS 60 in Cedarburg

Location
- Country: United States
- State: Wisconsin
- Counties: Milwaukee, Ozaukee

Highway system
- Wisconsin State Trunk Highway System; Interstate; US; State; Scenic; Rustic
← WIS 180	→ WIS 182

State Trunk Highway 181 (often called Highway 181, STH-181 or WIS 181) is a 21.44-mile (34.50 km) state highway in Milwaukee and Ozaukee counties in Wisconsin, United States, that runs north–south in southeast Wisconsin from West Allis to Cedarburg.

== Route description ==
WIS 181 begins at WIS 59 in West Allis near the Wisconsin State Fairgrounds as 84th Street. After passing by the fairgrounds, 84th Street crosses under I-94 and becomes Glenview Avenue. Prior to entering Wauwatosa, the route intersects US 18 (Bluemound Road) and exits the downtown area as 76th Street. WIS 190 (Capitol Drive) and WIS 175 (Appleton Avenue) are intersected prior to WIS 181 crossing over WIS 145 (Fond du Lac Freeway) and Silver Spring Drive. Before leaving Milwaukee County, WIS 181 crosses over WIS 100 (Brown Deer Road) and enters Ozaukee County in Mequon. The only major intersection prior to ending at WIS 60 near Cedarburg is at the intersection of WIS 167 (Mequon Road) in Mequon.

== Major intersections ==
County	Location	mi	km	Destinations	Notes
Milwaukee	West Allis			WIS 59 (West Greenfield Avenue)	
Milwaukee	Milwaukee			I-94	
Milwaukee	Wauwatosa			US 18 (Bluemound Road)	
Milwaukee	Milwaukee			WIS 190 (West Capitol Drive)	
Milwaukee	Milwaukee			WIS 175 (West Appleton Avenue)	
Milwaukee	Milwaukee			WIS 145	Interchange
Milwaukee	Milwaukee			CTH-E (West Silver Spring Drive)	Interchange
Milwaukee	Milwaukee			WIS 100 (West Brown Deer Road) – Brown Deer, Menomonee Falls	Interchange
Ozaukee	Mequon			WIS 167 (Mequon Road)	
Ozaukee	Town of Cedarburg			WIS 60 – Jackson, Grafton CTH-NN north – West Bend	
1.000 mi = 1.609 km; 1.000 km = 0.621 mi
