= Wisconsin Highway 164 =

State highway in Racine, Waukesha, and Washington counties in Wisconsin, United States

State Trunk Highway 164
- WIS 164 highlighted in red

Route information
- Maintained by WisDOT
- Length: 43.54 mi (70.07 km)

Major junctions
- South end: WIS 36 in Waterford
- I-43 in Big Bend; US 18 in Waukesha; I-94 / US 18 in Waukesha; I-94 in Pewaukee
- North end: WIS 60 in Slinger

Location
- Country: United States
- State: Wisconsin
- Counties: Racine, Waukesha, Washington

Highway system
- Wisconsin State Trunk Highway System; Interstate; US; State; Scenic; Rustic
← WIS 163	→ WIS 165

State Trunk Highway 164 (often called Highway 164, STH-164 or WIS 164) is a Wisconsin state highway running from Slinger, around the city of Waukesha, to Waterford.

== Route description ==
The southern terminus of Highway 164 is at the intersection of WIS 36 and Racine County Highway K, northeast of Waterford. County Highway K continues to the East towards Racine at WIS 38.

Highway 164 swings north on Big Bend Road, through the unincorporated towns of Tichigan and Wind Lake, crossing the Waukesha County line and heading into Big Bend.

In Big Bend, Highway 164 crosses County Highway L, Janesville Road. CTH L is the former routing of WIS 24, before it was truncated at Hales Corners. Continuing north, Highway 164 crosses Interstate 43 at exit 50.

On the outskirts of Waukesha, WIS 164 intersects with US 18 and WIS 59 at the Les Paul Parkway. WIS 164 then heads east and then north along the Parkway with WIS 59, on the east side of Waukesha. At Arcadian Avenue, WIS 59 turns east towards Milwaukee while Highway 164 continues north along with U.S. Highway 18 and East Moreland Boulevard. WIS 164 turns to the east with US 18 to I-94.

US 18 continues east on Bluemound Road into Brookfield, while WIS 164 is routed onto westbound I-94 at the Goerkes Corner interchange (Exit 297). Highway 164 is one of only two state highways that are routed onto I-94 in Wisconsin.

At exit 294, Highway 164 exits its concurrent routing with I-94 and turns north on Pewaukee Road. County Highway J continues south at the interchange, heading past the Waukesha County Airport (Crites Field) to the Waukesha County Courthouse.

WIS 164 runs north through the city of Pewaukee to its intersection with WIS 190 at Capitol Drive. Crossing WIS 190 and heading north and slightly to the west, Highway 164 runs through Sussex into Washington County.

Highway 164 continues due north through the countryside, crossing WIS 167, Holy Hill Road and WIS 175. WIS 164 continues north to its terminus at WIS 60, just to the east of Slinger.

== History ==
=== Designation ===
Most of Highway 164's routing changes have occurred in and around the city of Waukesha. 164 originated as a state connecting highway between Waukesha and Pewakuee, according to Christopher Bessert. The routing was changed when a northern extension of St. Paul Avenue opened in 1967.

In the late 1980s, 164 was lengthened to the south to its current terminus in Waterford. The increase in length resulted in a new routing through Waukesha, as 164 ran alongside U.S. Highway 18 on Moreland Road north of downtown to the Waukesha Bypass. The Bypass was built in the 1980s with the intent of routing WIS 59 around the southern edge of the city, eventually connecting US 18 on both sides of Waukesha. The western leg between 59 and 18 was never built due to protest. 164 and 59 run south along the outer edge of Waukesha to South East Avenue, where 164 diverts to the South.

In the late 1990s, Highway 164's original northern terminus of Capitol Drive was extended to its current terminus in Slinger. The extension was a result of the Wisconsin Department of Transportation wanting to connect two major highways, WIS 60 and WIS 190. The routing change made 164 and 190 share their routing between 164's old terminus at WIS 74 and County Highway J.

A few years later, in 2004, 164 was re-routed again onto the former County Highway J south of Capitol Drive, when that section was changed to a multi-lane divided highway from Interstate 94 north. Highway 164 was then routed to run on Interstate 94 between Highway J and the Goerke's Corners interchange with U.S. Highway 18. The only other Wisconsin state highway to travel concurrently with I-94 is Highway 35, in Hudson.

=== The Waukesha Bypass ===
The concept of a bypass highway around the perimeter of the city of Waukesha was first floated in the 1950s, as part of the first freeway plans in the state.

The main reason for such a bypass is due to the traffic congestion in the northern part of Waukesha, especially at the intersection of West Moreland Boulevard, East North Street and East Saint Paul Avenue, on the west side of the Fox River from Frame Park. The heavy-traffic intersection also has a railroad crossing just over the river along Frame Park, and also has the intersection of Moreland and White Rock Avenue.

In the early 1980s, the eastern section of the bypass was completed around the East side of the city of Waukesha, from Moreland Road and U.S. Highway 18 to South East Avenue. The route was designated as Highway 164 for the entire length, with Highway 59 running from Arcadian Avenue to South East Avenue, and then continuing west to Genesee Road. The section between East and Genesee was slowly upgraded, eliminating the at-grade railroad crossing just beyond West Avenue, until the current divided highway was completed by the late 1990s.

The bypass was renamed the Les Paul Parkway in the 1990s, in honor of the Waukesha native who was a key innovator of the solid-body electric guitar.

Waukesha County is again discussing a plan to complete the western section of the bypass by connecting Highway 59 with what is now County Highway TT. The problem with construction of that portion of the bypass is partially environmental; the routing would require road building through wetlands of the lower Fox River. There is also a rail spur and a large amount of semi-rural residential area that would be affected by new road construction.

== Major intersections ==
County	Location	mi	km	Destinations	Notes
Racine	Village of Waterford– Town of Waterford line	0.00	0.00	WIS 36 (Milwaukee Avenue) CTH-K east (Apple Road)	Southern terminus; roadway continues as Apple Road
Waukesha	Big Bend	10.10	16.25	I-43 – Milwaukee	Diamond interchange
Waukesha	Waukesha	14.79	23.80	WIS 59 west (Les Paul Parkway) / US 18	Southern end of WIS 59 concurrency
Waukesha	Waukesha	17.99	28.95	WIS 59 east (Arcadian Avenue)	Northern end of WIS 59 concurrency
Waukesha	Waukesha	18.88	30.38	US 18 west (Moreland Boulevard)	Western end of US 18 concurrency
Waukesha	Town of Brookfield	20.48	32.96	I-94 east – Milwaukee US 18 east (Moreland Boulevard)	Eastern end of US 18 concurrency; eastern end of I-94 concurrency
Waukesha	Pewaukee	23.48	37.79	I-94 west – Madison	Western end of I-94 concurrency
Waukesha	Pewaukee	25.88	41.65	WIS 190 (Capitol Drive)	
Waukesha	Sussex	28.47	45.82	CTH-K (Lisbon Road)	
Waukesha	Sussex	29.37	47.27	CTH-J	Southern end of CTH-J concurrency
Waukesha	Town of Lisbon	30.17	48.55	CTH-VV (Silver Spring Drive)	
Waukesha–Washington county line	Lisbon–Richfield line	34.47	55.47	CTH-J south CTH-Q	Northern terminus of CTH-J concurrency
Washington	Richfield	38.56	62.06	WIS 167 (Holy Hill Road)	
Washington	Slinger	47.81	76.94	WIS 60 (Commerce Boulevard); Lovers Lane	Northern terminus; road continues as Lovers Lane
1.000 mi = 1.609 km; 1.000 km = 0.621 mi: Concurrency terminus
