= Goerke's Corners, Wisconsin =

- Former unincorporated community
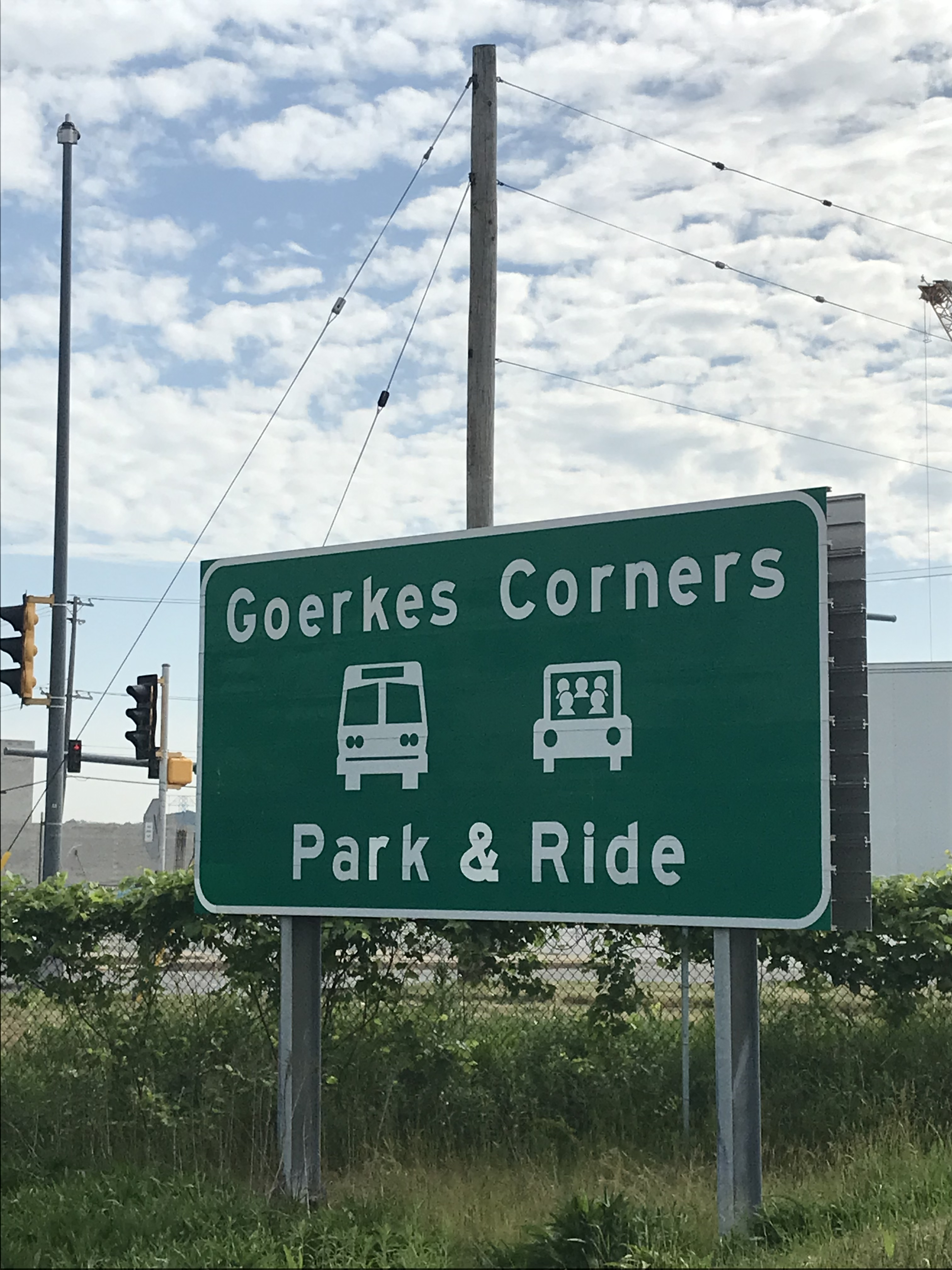

- Location within Wisconsin Location within the United States
- Coordinates: 43°02′11″N 88°09′58″W
- Country: United States
- State: Wisconsin
- County: Waukesha
- Elevation: 869 ft (265 m)
- Time zone: UTC-6 (Central (CST))
  - Summer (DST): UTC-5 (CDT)
- Area code: 262
- GNIS feature ID: 1577616

Goerke's Corners (also spelled Goerkes Corner, Goerkes Corners or Goerke's Corner) is a former unincorporated community in the Town of Brookfield, in Waukesha County, Wisconsin, United States. It is now the location of a major highway intersection, and the site of a park-and-ride lot.

== History ==
This crossroads was originally called Storyville, after one Augustus Story who settled in the area about 1837. It was later known as Blodgett or Blodgett's Corners, probably for one Chester Blodgett who arrived in 1843. The Watertown Plank Road between Milwaukee and Watertown was built through this area during 1848–54, and a spur to Waukesha in 1850. The current name comes from Frederick Goerke, blacksmith, wagonmaker, and innkeeper in this area in the 1870s. A post office was located there (under the name Blodgett) from 1885 to 1895, with Frederick Goerke as postmaster.

The first segment of Interstate 94 through this area was opened in 1958. By the late 20th century, this intersection, now involving Wisconsin Highway 164, U.S. Route 18 and Interstate 94, had become one of the busiest in southeastern Wisconsin, and is the westernmost major waypoint in local radio and television traffic reports. It is the site of a park-and-ride lot used by Badger Bus, the Milwaukee County Transit System, and others. The former site of the settlement is now taken up by shopping centers, office buildings, hotels, apartments, and their associated parking lots. The "Goerke's Corners" name continues to be used to reference the area, although it looks much different than it did earlier.

In the late 1920s, Les Paul worked at a truck stop hamburger stand playing guitar and singing. He invented the electric guitar after realizing that customers could not hear his guitar over the sound of the trucks.

In the 1949 movie It's a Great Feeling, Hollywood hopeful Judy Adams (Doris Day) proudly states that she grew up there. The place is mentioned several times in the movie, and Judy eventually returns there, disillusioned, and the film closes in Goerke's Corners with Judy marrying her old sweetheart.
