= Newville, Wisconsin =

- Unincorporated community
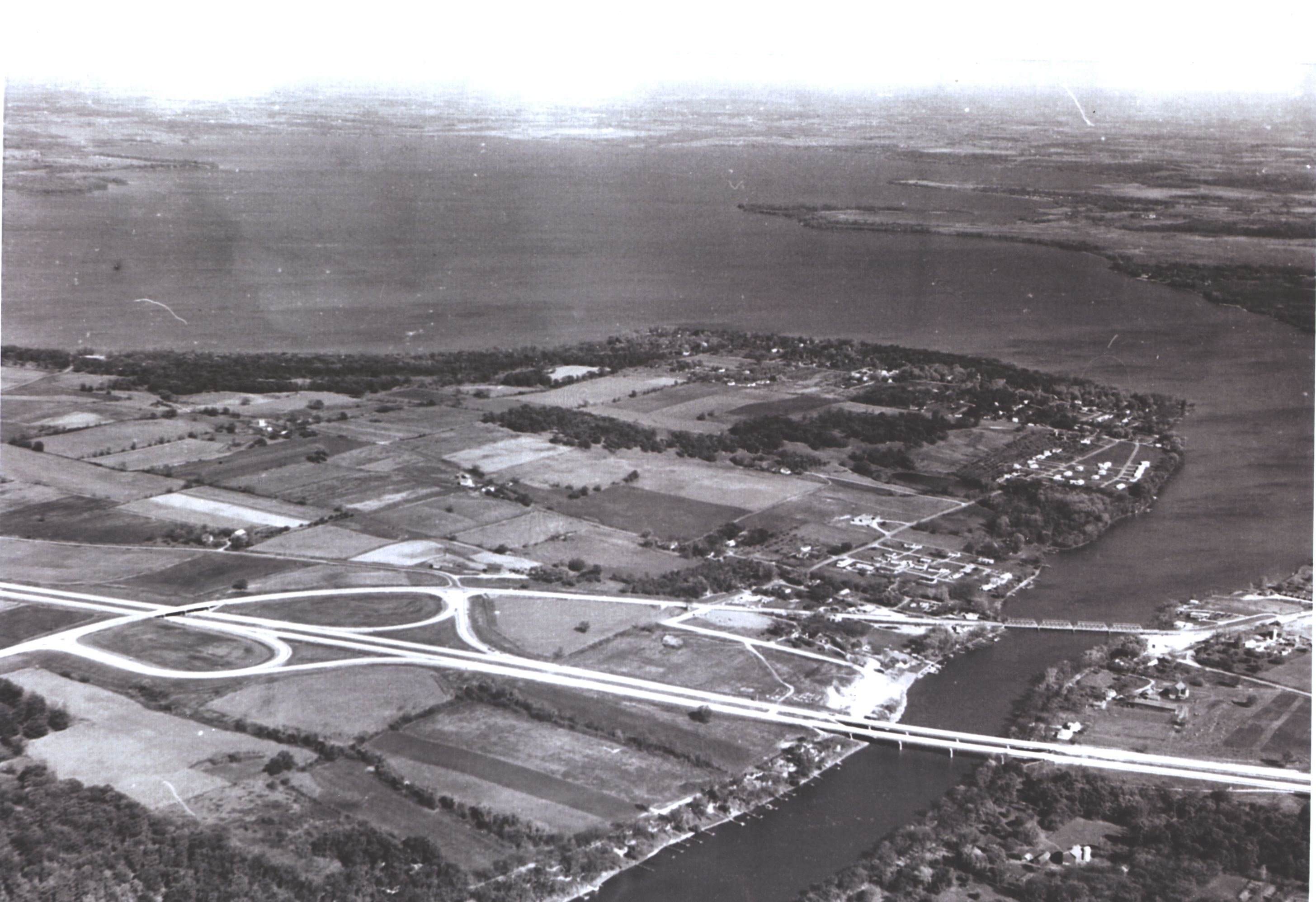
- 1964 aerial view of Newville with Lake Koshkonong/Rock River in the background. Interstate 90 can be seen in the foreground.

- Location within Wisconsin Location within the United States
- Coordinates: 42°49′44″N 89°01′17″W
- Country: United States
- State: Wisconsin
- County: Rock
- Elevation: 784 ft (239 m)
- Time zone: UTC-6 (Central (CST))
  - Summer (DST): UTC-5 (CDT)
- Area code: 608
- GNIS feature ID: 1570270

Newville is an unincorporated community located in the towns of Fulton and Milton, Rock County, Wisconsin, United States.
