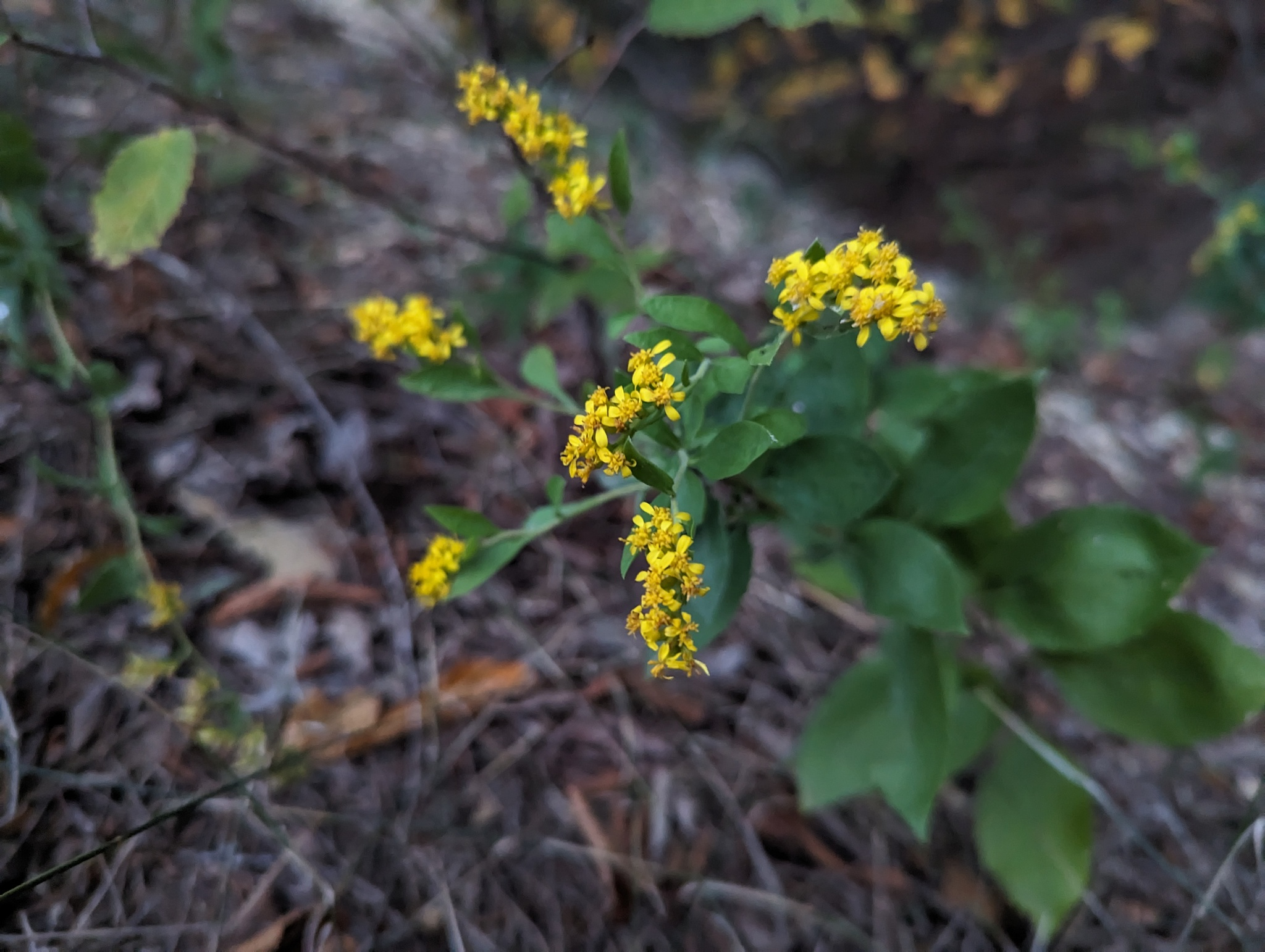

Scientific classification
- Kingdom: Plantae
- Clade: Tracheophytes
- Clade: Angiosperms
- Clade: Eudicots
- Clade: Asterids
- Order: Asterales
- Family: Asteraceae
- Genus: Solidago
- Species: S. drummondii

Binomial name
- Solidago drummondii Torr. & A.Gray

Synonyms
- Aster torreyi Kuntze 1891 not Porter 1890

= Solidago drummondii =

Species of flowering plant

Solidago drummondii, commonly called Drummond's goldenrod, is a North American species of flowering plants in the family Asteraceae. It is native to the middle Mississippi Valley of the Central United States, primarily in Missouri and Arkansas but with additional populations in Louisiana and Illinois.

Solidago drummondii is a perennial herb up to 100 cm (40 inches) tall, with an underground caudex and rhizomes. One plant can produce 200 or more small yellow flower heads in a large branching (sometimes drooping) array at the top of the plant.
