= Merrimac Ferry =

Ferry in Wisconsin, United States

Coordinates: 43°22′08″N 89°37′31″W

History
- Name: Colsac I
- Namesake: Columbia and Sauk counties
- Builder: Dubuque, Iowa
- Launched: 1924
- In service: 1933
- Out of service: 1963

General characteristics
- Propulsion: Two diesel engines
- Capacity: 15 vehicles
- Name: Colsac II
- Builder: Marinette Marine, Marinette, Wisconsin
- Cost: $77,000
- Christened: April 6, 1963
- In service: April 15, 1963
- Out of service: November 4, 2002

General characteristics
- Tonnage: 100 tons
- Length: 100 ft (30 m) o/a
- Beam: 33 ft (10 m)
- Propulsion: 1 × diesel engine
- Capacity: 12 vehicles
- Crew: 1
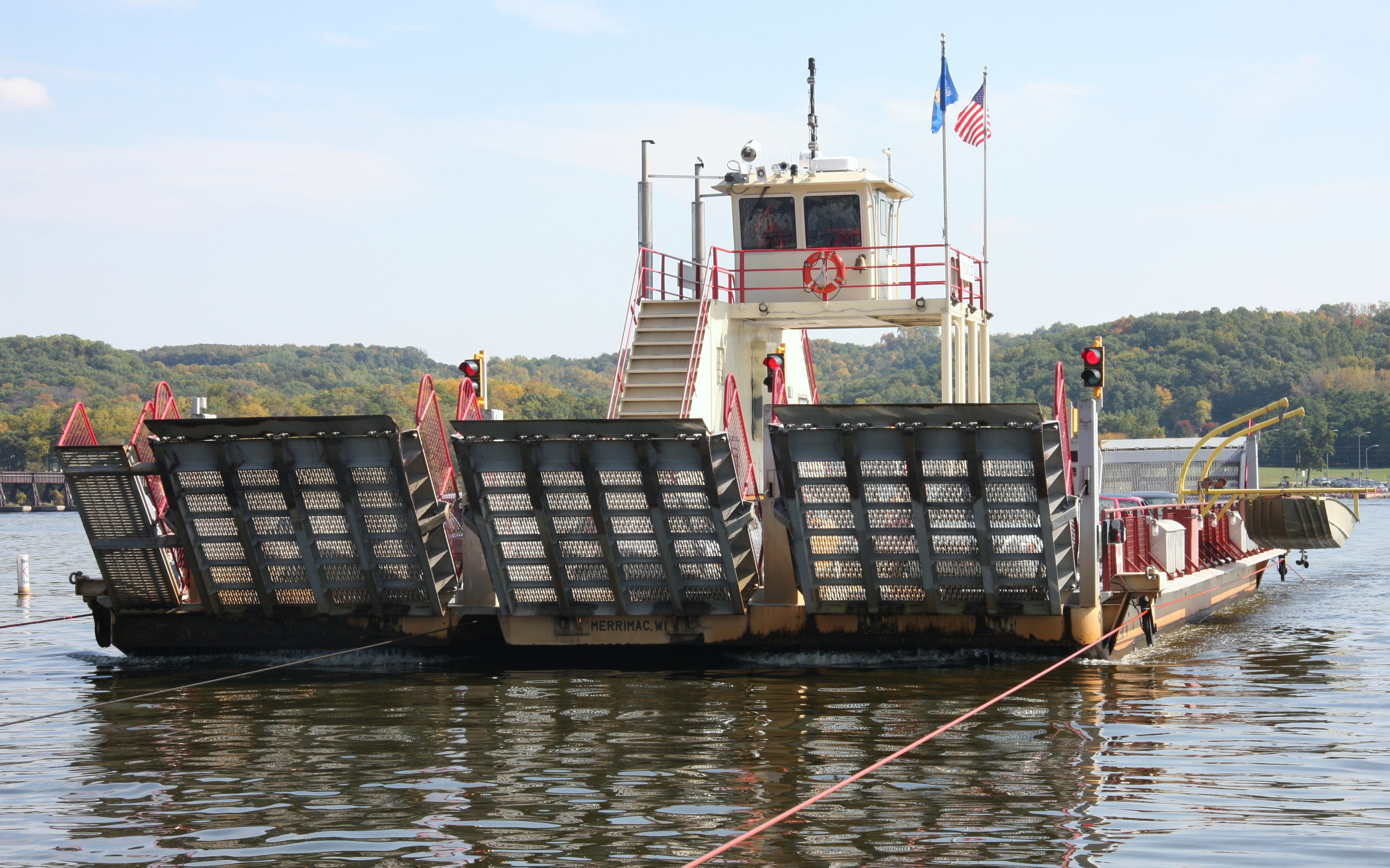
- Colsac III, September 2014
- Name: Colsac III
- Builder: Basic Marine Inc., Escanaba, Michigan
- Cost: $2.2 million
- Yard number: 116
- In service: May 6, 2003
- Identification: Official number: 1138723

General characteristics
- Tonnage: 153 GT
- Length: 105 ft (32 m) o/a
- Propulsion: (2x)Cummins Diesel
- Capacity: 230 passengers; 15 vehicles
- Merrimac Ferry
- U.S. National Register of Historic Places
- Location: Wisconsin Highway 113 at the Wisconsin River
- Nearest city: Merrimac, Wisconsin
- NRHP reference No.: 74000330
- Added to NRHP: December 31, 1974

The Merrimac Ferry is a cable ferry that crosses the Wisconsin River between Columbia and Sauk Counties in Wisconsin. Its western point is located near the village of Merrimac on State Highway 113 and United States Bicycle Route 30. The eastern point is located in Okee, Wisconsin.

The Merrimac Ferry is both a functional regional crossing and a tourist attraction. There are ice cream stands at queue areas on either side of the river. It is the state's only free ferry, as well as the only ferry left on the Wisconsin State Trunk Highway System.

The ferry is close to the head of Lake Wisconsin, as well as regional recreation areas, including Devil's Lake and Wisconsin Dells. Peak traffic coincides with the tourist season and weekend getaway schedules.

== Operations ==
The ferryboat is named the Colsac III. "Colsac" is a portmanteau of Columbia and Sauk, the two counties connected by the ferry.

The ferry operates 24 hours a day, 7 days a week, but only from April to November. The ferry will often operate into December depending on when the Lake Wisconsin ice becomes too thick to operate the ferry. The ferry winches itself across the river on three submerged cables. A round trip usually takes 14 minutes. Colsac III can hold up to fifteen normal-size cars or trucks, as well as bicycles and pedestrians, and is capable of transporting semi-trailers. The state operates warning signs several miles from the ferry to alert motorists when it is not operating in season, as detours are considerable, and a traffic information system provides drivers with the expected wait time, which can be up to 50 minutes in peak season. Traffic volume can exceed 1200 vehicles daily.

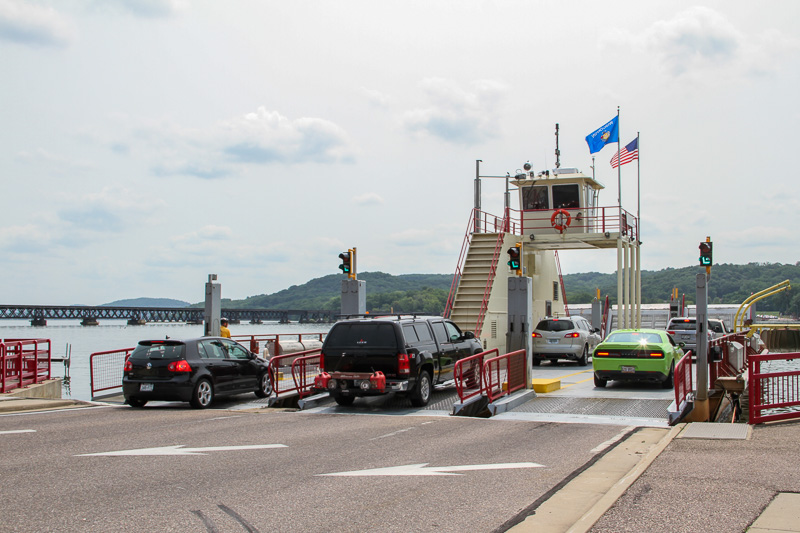
Cars drive onto the ferry from the landing in Merrimac in July 2015

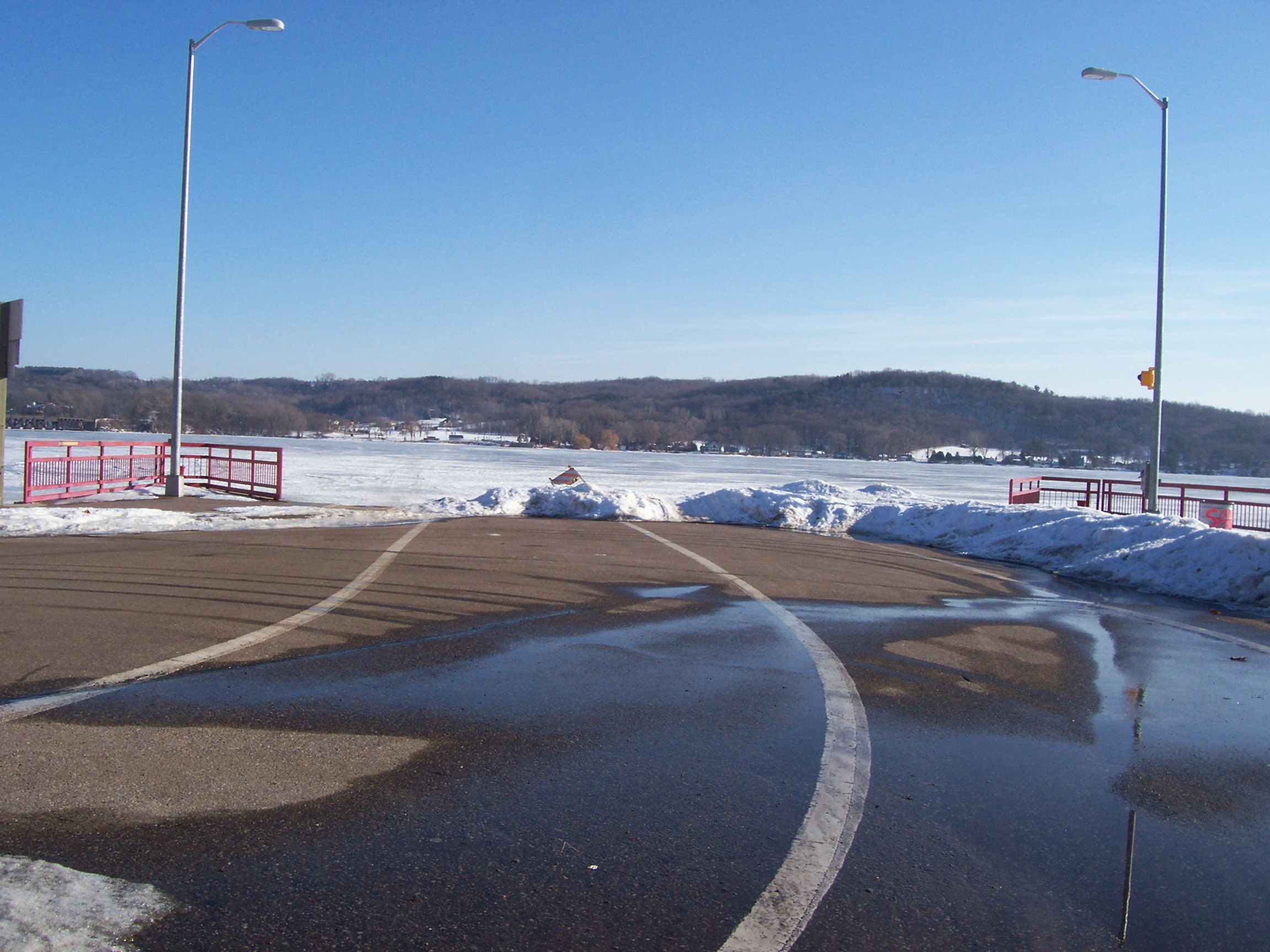
Western docks in winter

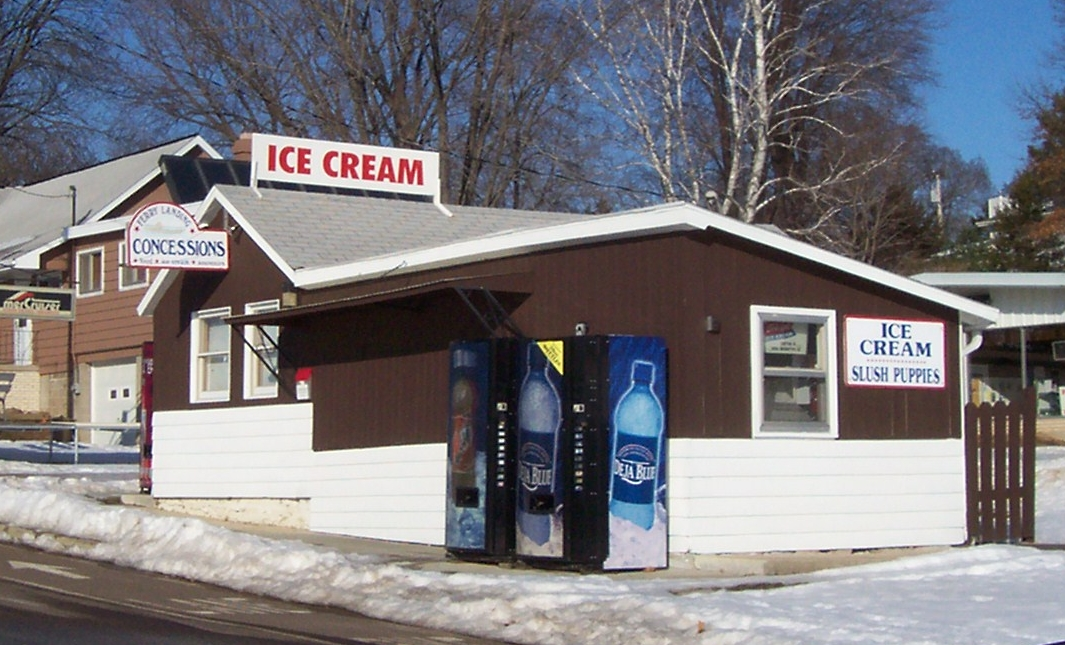
Concessions stand at western dock

== History ==
In 1844, Chester Mattson obtained a charter to provide ferry service at the present-day location. The ferry was in operation long before there was a marked road leading to or away from it. According to conflicting sources, Mattson charged either 35 cents or $1 to ferry a team and wagon across the river. The ferry was human-powered until around the turn of the century, when the first gasoline engine was added. The State of Wisconsin took over the ferry as part of the state highway system in 1933, with operation and maintenance performed by the Columbia County Department of Transportation. The toll was eliminated. The wooden ferry then in service, the first Colsac, had a capacity of eight cars. It was replaced by the Colsac II in 1963, with a capacity of twelve cars.

The state has periodically considered a bridge to increase the capacity of the state highway and ease commuting for local residents. (The ferry is just west of a 19th-century Wisconsin and Southern Railroad bridge.) As the Colsac II aged, periodic maintenance both grew expensive and took the ferry out of commission for weeks at a time. The older boat's capacity was also frequently strained during the peak travel season, and weight limitations restricted truck traffic. The ferry remained popular with tourists and the tourist industry. Supporters of the ferry won out, the bridge proposal was shelved, and the ferry was upgraded.

The latest, modern-day ferry was launched on May 16, 2003. It cost $2.2 million to build and was dedicated to sitting Governor Jim Doyle. The new boat was unreliable in its first season, though, spending several weeks out of commission. The state eventually sued the boat builder.

The state was unsuccessful in its attempt to sell the retired ferry, the Colsac II, using an Internet auction, so the boat was eventually sold for scrap.

== See also ==
- National Register of Historic Places listings in Wisconsin
