= Merrimac (town), Wisconsin =

Town in Wisconsin, U.S.

Merrimac, Wisconsin
- Town
- Town of Merrimac
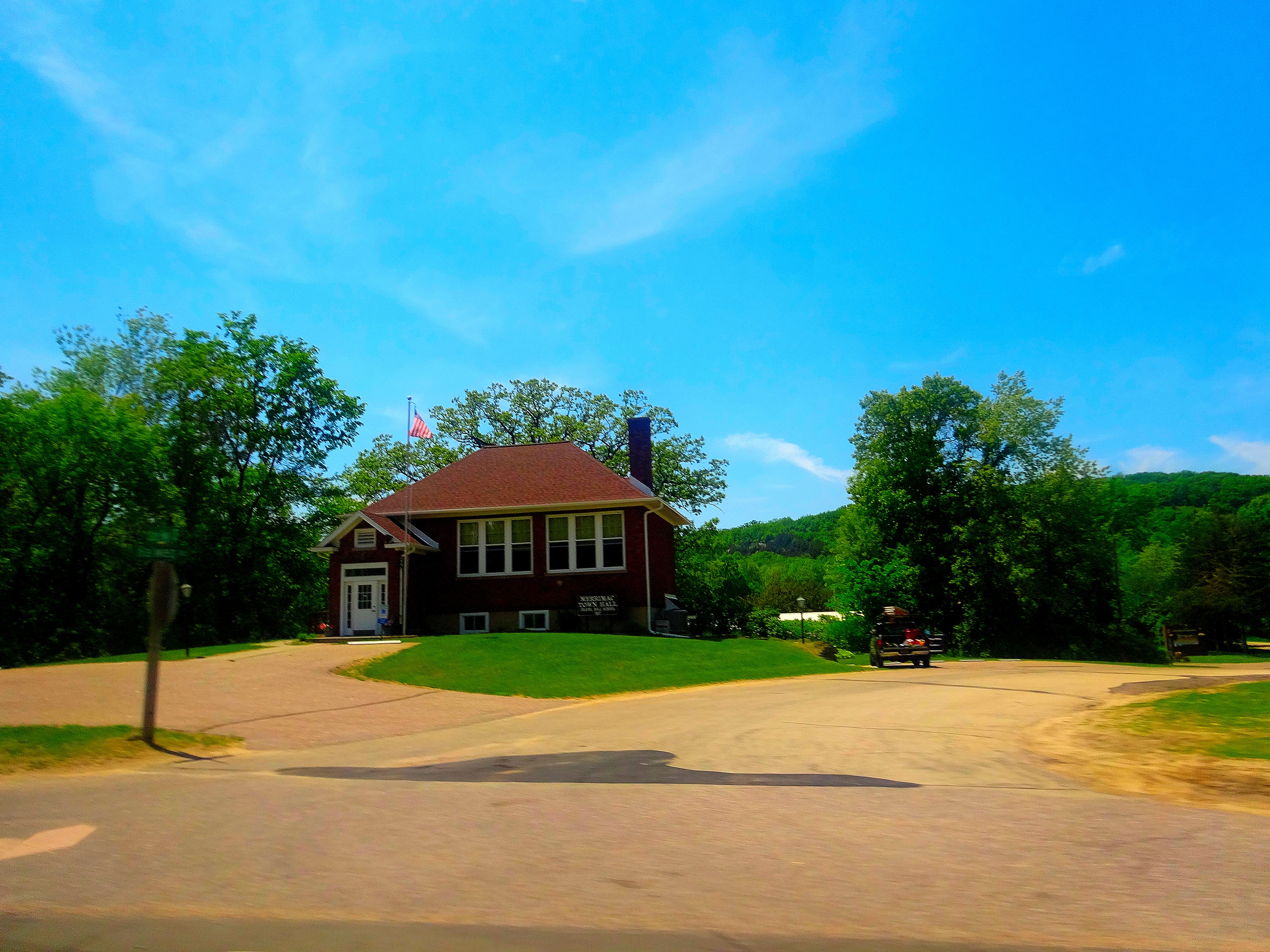
- Town hall

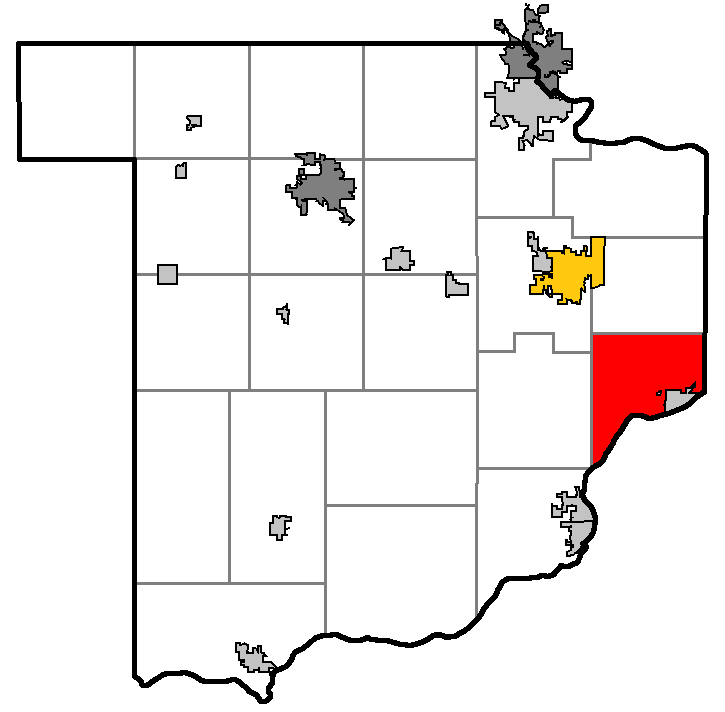
- Location of Merrimac, Sauk County, Wisconsin

- Location of Sauk County, Wisconsin
- Coordinates: 43°23′12″N 89°40′20″W
- Country: United States
- State: Wisconsin
- County: Sauk

Area
  - Total: 26.19 sq mi (67.8 km^{2})
  - Land: 24.21 sq mi (62.7 km^{2})
  - Water: 1.96 sq mi (5.1 km^{2})

Population (2020)
  - Total: 1,247
  - Density: 51.51/sq mi (19.89/km^{2})
- Time zone: UTC-6 (Central (CST))
  - Summer (DST): UTC-5 (CDT)
- Area code(s): 608 and 353
- GNIS feature ID: 1583705
- Website: https://townofmerrimac.net/

Merrimac is a town in Sauk County, Wisconsin, United States. The population was 1,247 at the 2020 census. The Village of Merrimac is located within the town. The unincorporated community of Moon Valley is located in the town. The census-designated place of Lake Wisconsin is also located partially in the town.

== Geography ==
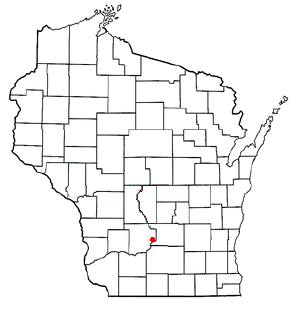
Location of Merrimac (town), Wisconsin

According to the United States Census Bureau, the town has a total area of 26.3 square miles (68.1 km^{2}), of which 24.5 square miles (63.4 km^{2}) is land and 1.8 square miles (4.8 km^{2}) o (6.99%) is water.

== Demographics ==
As of the census of 2000, there were 868 people, 392 households, and 259 families residing in the town. The population density was 35.5 people per square mile (13.7/km^{2}). There were 654 housing units at an average density of 26.7 per square mile (10.3/km^{2}). The racial makeup of the town was 99.77% White, 0.12% Asian, 0.12% from other races. 0.12% of the population were Hispanic or Latino of any race.

There were 392 households, out of which 22.2% had children under the age of 18 living with them, 59.2% were married couples living together, 4.3% had a female householder with no husband present, and 33.9% were non-families. 25.3% of all households were made up of individuals, and 7.9% had someone living alone who was 65 years of age or older. The average household size was 2.21 and the average family size was 2.66.

The population was 17.9% under the age of 18, 4.1% from 18 to 24, 24.2% from 25 to 44, 37.2% from 45 to 64, and 16.6% who were 65 years of age or older. The median age was 47 years. For every 100 females, there were 107.2 males. For every 100 females age 18 and over, there were 104.9 males.

The median income for a household in the town was $47,115, and the median income for a family was $56,071. Males had a median income of $36,667 versus $25,543 for females. The per capita income for the town was $26,044. About 2.5% of families and 5.3% of the population were below the poverty line, including 9.7% of those under age 18 and 1.5% of those age 65 or over.

== See also ==
- Badger Army Ammunition Plant
