= West Point, Wisconsin =

- Town
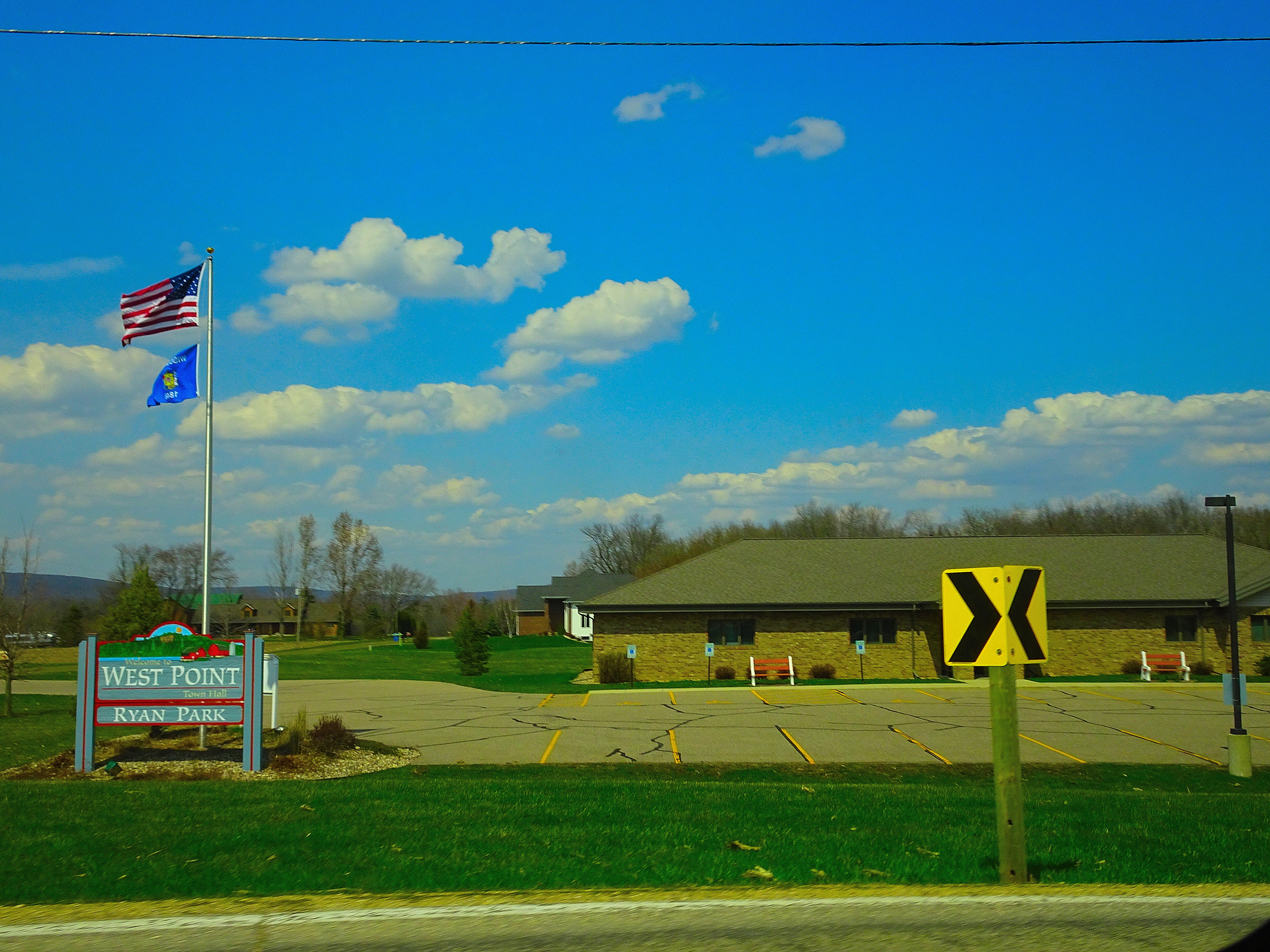
- Town hall

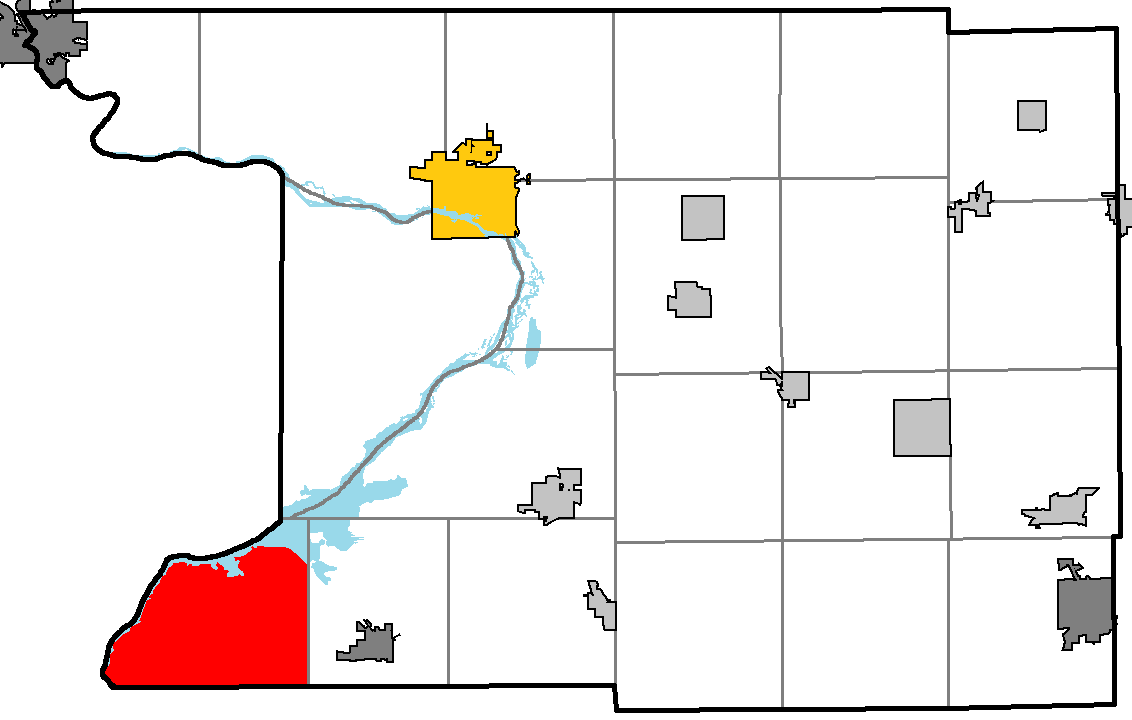
- Location of West Point, within Columbia County, Wisconsin

- Location of Columbia County, Wisconsin
- Coordinates: 43°19′11″N 89°38′15″W
- Country: United States
- State: Wisconsin
- County: Columbia

Area
  - Total: 32.5 sq mi (84.1 km^{2})
  - Land: 28.9 sq mi (74.9 km^{2})
  - Water: 3.6 sq mi (9.2 km^{2})
- Elevation: 850 ft (260 m)

Population (2020)
  - Total: 2,028
  - Density: 70.1/sq mi (27.1/km^{2})
- Time zone: UTC-6 (Central (CST))
  - Summer (DST): UTC-5 (CDT)
- FIPS code: 55-86100
- GNIS feature ID: 1584414
- Website: http://townofwestpoint.us

West Point is a town in Columbia County, Wisconsin, United States. The population was 2,028 at the 2020 census.

== Geography ==
According to the United States Census Bureau, the town has a total area of 32.5 square miles (84.1 km^{2}), of which 28.9 square miles (74.9 km^{2}) is land and 3.5 square miles (9.2 km^{2}) (10.94%) is water.

== Demographics ==
As of the census of 2000, there were 1,634 people, 660 households, and 485 families residing in the town. The population density was 56.5 people per square mile (21.8/km^{2}). There were 907 housing units at an average density of 31.4 per square mile (12.1/km^{2}). The racial makeup of the town was 98.35% White, 0.49% African American, 0.43% Asian, 0.24% from other races, and 0.49% from two or more races. Hispanic or Latino people of any race were 0.86% of the population.

There were 660 households, out of which 29.8% had children under the age of 18 living with them, 68.5% were married couples living together, 2.6% had a female householder with no husband present, and 26.4% were non-families. 22% of all households were made up of individuals, and 8.8% had someone living alone who was 65 years of age or older. The average household size was 2.48 and the average family size was 2.92.

In the town, the population was spread out, with 24% under the age of 18, 3.6% from 18 to 24, 26.4% from 25 to 44, 30.9% from 45 to 64, and 15.1% who were 65 years of age or older. The median age was 42 years. For every 100 females, there were 105 males. For every 100 females age 18 and over, there were 105.6 males.

The median income for a household in the town was $55,781, and the median income for a family was $62,132. Males had a median income of $39,063 versus $28,403 for females. The per capita income for the town was $30,750. About 2.5% of families and 3.8% of the population were below the poverty line, including 3.1% of those under age 18 and 5.9% of those age 65 or over.

== Protected areas ==
- Gibraltar Rock State Natural Area

== Notable people ==
- Horace N. Polley, Wisconsin State Representative and farmer; lived on a farm in West Point
