= Lake Wisconsin =

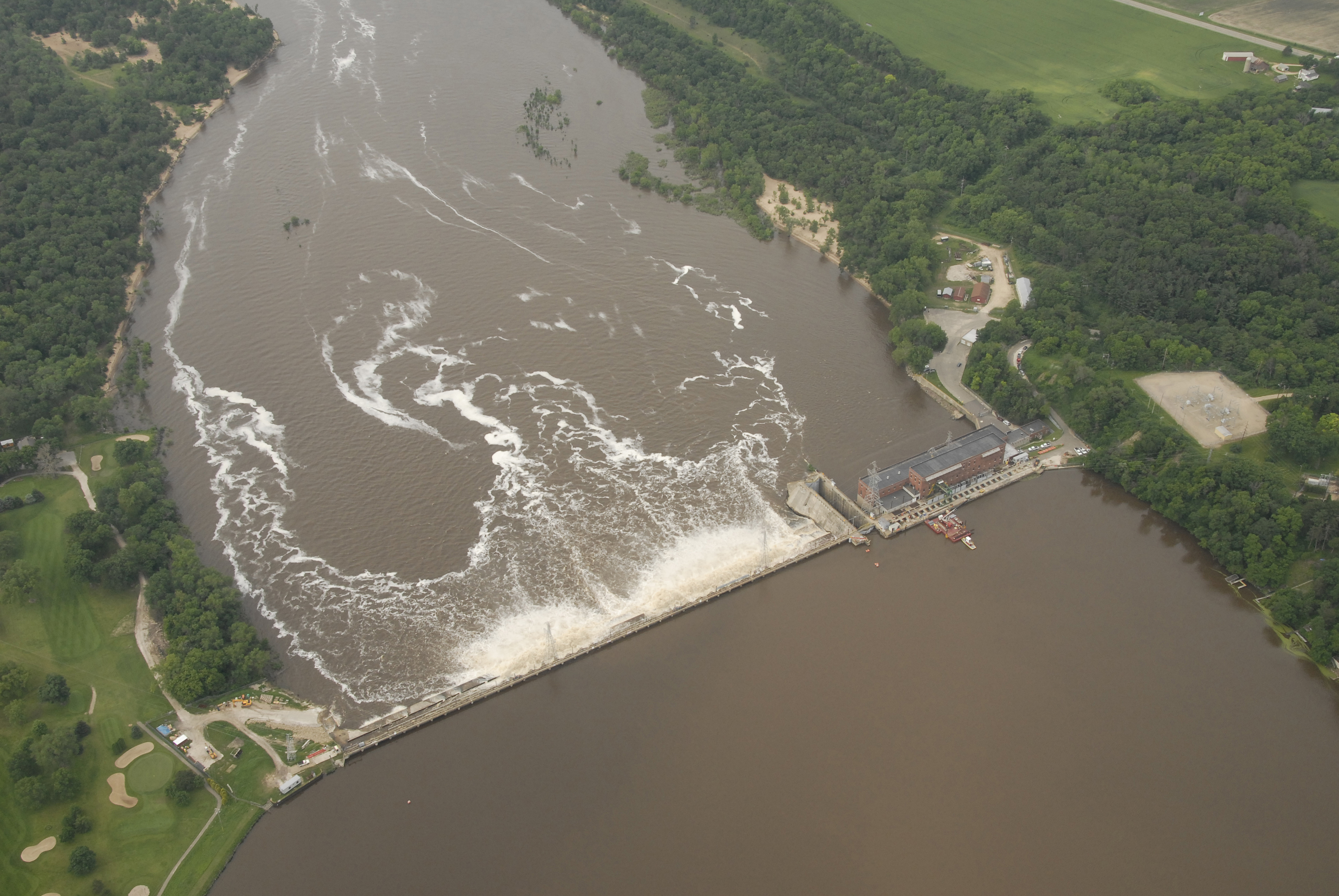
- Aerial view of the Prairie du Sac Dam, which impounds Lake Wisconsin, taken during the June 2008 flood.

- Location within Wisconsin
- Location: Columbia / Sauk counties, Wisconsin, United States
- Coordinates: 43°18′36″N 89°43′29″W
- Lake type: reservoir
- Primary inflows: Wisconsin River
- Primary outflows: Wisconsin River
- Basin countries: United States
- Surface area: 9,500 acres (3,800 ha)
- Max. depth: 40 ft (12 m)
- Surface elevation: about 774 ft (236 m)

Lake Wisconsin is a reservoir on the Wisconsin River in southern Wisconsin in the United States. It is located in Columbia and Sauk counties, approximately 5 miles (8.0 km) southeast of Baraboo and 25 miles (40 km) NNW of Madison. The area around the lake is home to the Wisconsin wine appellation of the Lake Wisconsin AVA.

Lake Wisconsin was formed by the construction of the Prairie du Sac Dam, which was begun in 1911 and completed in 1914. It is part of the Wisconsin River system of reservoirs. The lake has a maximum depth of 24 feet (7.3 m). It has an area of 7,197 acres (29.13 km^{2}).

Its construction effectively ended the Fox-Wisconsin Waterway connection to the Mississippi River, although commercial traffic had ended decades before completion of the dam.

The lake provides flood control and is a popular destination for recreational boating and fishing.

In 1966, the Wisconsin state record Common Carp was caught in Lake Wisconsin, weighing 57 lbs. 2 oz.

The Merrimac Ferry crosses the lake at Merrimac, Wisconsin.
