= Merrimac, Wisconsin =

- Village
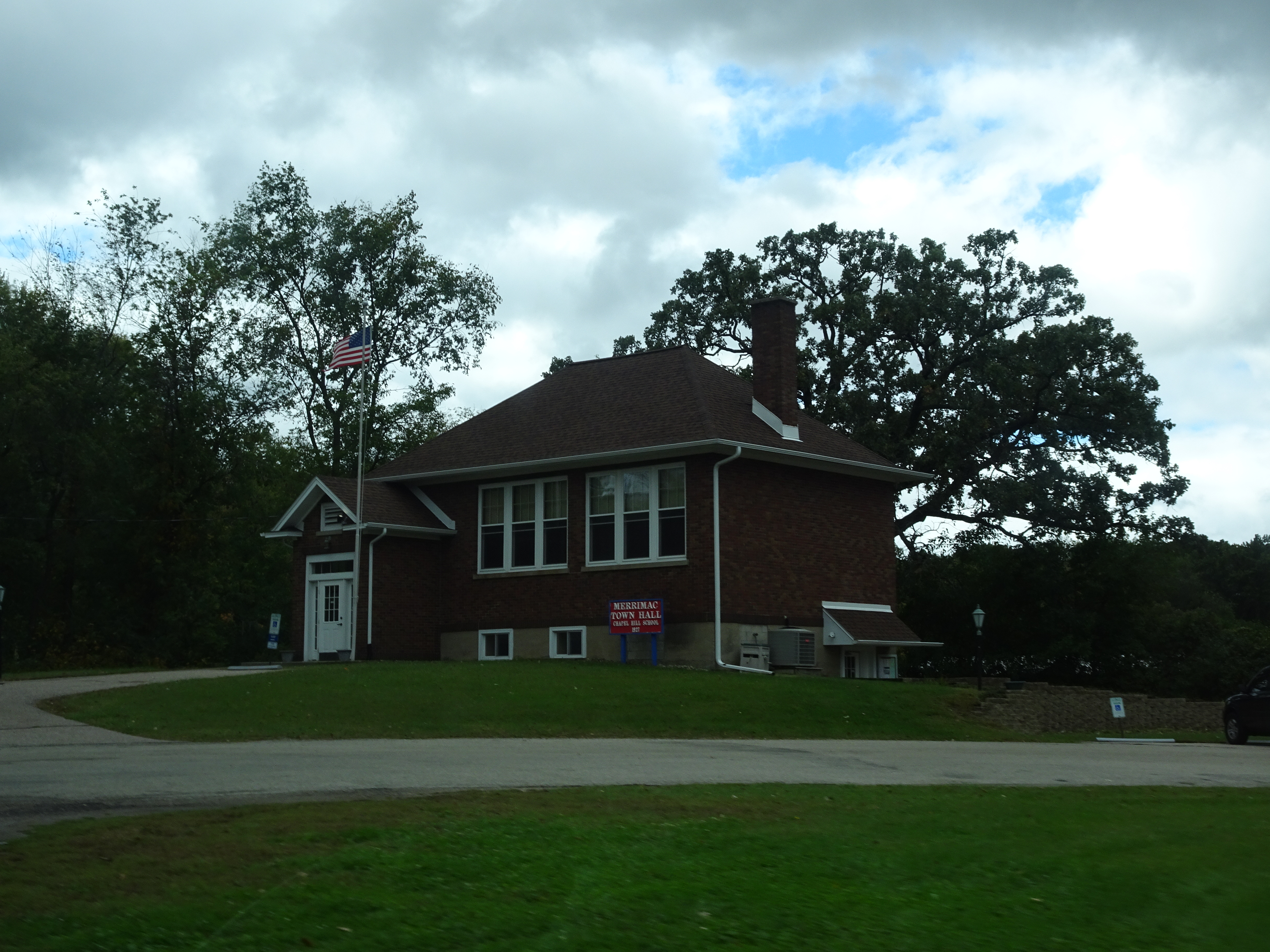
- Merrimac Town Hall,

- Location of Merrimac in Sauk County, Wisconsin.
- Coordinates: 43°21′52″N 89°41′27″W
- Country: United States
- State: Wisconsin
- County: Sauk
- Incorporated: October 23, 1899

Area
  - Total: 1.48 sq mi (3.84 km^{2})
  - Land: 0.82 sq mi (2.13 km^{2})
  - Water: 0.66 sq mi (1.71 km^{2})
- Elevation: 814 ft (248 m)

Population (2020)
  - Total: 527
  - Density: 641/sq mi (247/km^{2})
- Time zone: UTC-6 (Central (CST))
  - Summer (DST): UTC-5 (CDT)
- Area code: 608
- FIPS code: 55-51350
- GNIS feature ID: 1569373
- Website: merrimacwi.gov

Merrimac is a village in Sauk County, Wisconsin, United States, northwest of Madison. The population was 527 at the 2020 census. The village is located within the Town of Merrimac.

It is the location of the Merrimac Ferry, a free ferry across the Wisconsin River operated by the state.

== History ==
A post office called Merrimac was established in 1855. The village was named after the Merrimack River, in New England.

== Geography ==
Merrimac is located at 43°22′26″N 89°37′43″W (43.37391, -89.628857).

According to the United States Census Bureau, the village has a total area of 1.51 square miles (3.91 km^{2}), of which 0.85 square miles (2.20 km^{2}) is land and 0.66 square miles (1.71 km^{2}) is water.

== Demographics ==
Historical population
Census	Pop.	Note	%±
1880	147		—
1900	350		—
1910	312		−10.9%
1920	270		−13.5%
1930	250		−7.4%
1940	234		−6.4%
1950	317		35.5%
1960	297		−6.3%
1970	376		26.6%
1980	365		−2.9%
1990	392		7.4%
2000	416		6.1%
2010	420		1.0%
2020	527		25.5%
U.S. Decennial Census

=== 2010 census ===
As of the census of 2010, there were 420 people, 185 households, and 123 families living in the village. The population density was 494.1 inhabitants per square mile (190.8/km^{2}). There were 257 housing units at an average density of 302.4 per square mile (116.8/km^{2}). The racial makeup of the village was 97.9% White, 0.2% African American, 0.7% from other races, and 1.2% from two or more races. Hispanic or Latino of any race were 3.1% of the population.

There were 185 households, of which 25.4% had children under the age of 18 living with them, 54.1% were married couples living together, 9.7% had a female householder with no husband present, 2.7% had a male householder with no wife present, and 33.5% were non-families. 23.8% of all households were made up of individuals, and 10.2% had someone living alone who was 65 years of age or older. The average household size was 2.27 and the average family size was 2.65.

The median age in the village was 48 years. 19% of residents were under the age of 18; 3.6% were between the ages of 18 and 24; 21.9% were from 25 to 44; 36.5% were from 45 to 64; and 19% were 65 years of age or older. The gender makeup of the village was 48.3% male and 51.7% female.

=== 2000 census ===
As of the census of 2000, there were 416 people, 166 households, and 120 families living in the village. The population density was 547.9 people per square mile (211.3/km^{2}). There were 218 housing units at an average density of 287.1 per square mile (110.8/km^{2}). The racial makeup of the village was 96.88% White, 0.72% Black or African American, 0.24% Native American, 0.24% Asian, 1.20% from other races, and 0.72% from two or more races. 1.44% of the population were Hispanic or Latino of any race.

There were 166 households, out of which 31.9% had children under the age of 18 living with them, 59.6% were married couples living together, 9.0% had a female householder with no husband present, and 27.7% were non-families. 24.7% of all households were made up of individuals, and 9.6% had someone living alone who was 65 years of age or older. The average household size was 2.51 and the average family size was 2.91.

In the village, the population was spread out, with 24.8% under the age of 18, 5.5% from 18 to 24, 27.4% from 25 to 44, 26.0% from 45 to 64, and 16.3% who were 65 years of age or older. The median age was 41 years. For every 100 females, there were 91.7 males. For every 100 females age 18 and over, there were 95.6 males.

The median income for a household in the village was $41,250, and the median income for a family was $42,656. Males had a median income of $27,361 versus $25,357 for females. The per capita income for the village was $19,091. About 3.4% of families and 3.1% of the population were below the poverty line, including 2.8% of those under age 18 and 6.2% of those age 65 or over.

== See also ==
- Badger Army Ammunition Plant
- Durward's Glen, historic property
- List of villages in Wisconsin
