= Wisconsin Highway 74 =

Former State Highway in Wisconsin, United States

State Trunk Highway 74

Route information
- Maintained by WisDOT
- Length: 11.68 mi (18.80 km)
- Existed: 1917–2015

Major junctions
- West end: WIS 190 in Pewaukee
- East end: US 41 / US 45 / WIS 100 in Menomonee Falls

Location
- Country: United States
- State: Wisconsin
- Counties: Waukesha

Highway system
- Wisconsin State Trunk Highway System; Interstate; US; State; Scenic; Rustic
← WIS 73	→ WIS 75

State Trunk Highway 74 (often called Highway 74, STH-74 or WIS 74) was a state highway in the U.S. state of Wisconsin. A semi-urban road that ran entirely in Waukesha County, it went north from Pewaukee and turned east at Sussex toward Menomonee Falls.

== Route description ==
WIS 74 began at the interchange of Redford Boulevard (County Trunk Highway F, CTH-F) and Capitol Drive (WIS 190) in Pewaukee. The interchange is a jug-handle with exit ramps from Capitol Drive on the northeast and southeast corners. At one time, this was the northern terminus for WIS 164, before it was extended north and routed to the west.

WIS 74 followed a mostly northern route into Sussex, passing several rock quarries on its way into the town. In Sussex, WIS 74 turned east onto Main Street, crossing over a set of railroad tracks and passing the Quad Graphics printing plant. At the intersection with Town Line Road, WIS 74 turned north under a railroad trestle and heads towards the northwest into the town of Lannon. The route continued on Main Street in Menomonee Falls, where it crossed WIS 175 (Appleton Avenue).

WIS 74 ended at its intersection with U.S. Highway 41/U.S. Highway 45 (US 41/US 45) and WIS 100. WIS 100 runs east from the interchange to the County Line, then runs east on Brown Deer Road to its northeast terminus at v32.

On November 1, 2015, WIS 74 was removed from the state highway system. It was replaced by an extension of CTH-F until it reached the Menomonee Falls village limits. East of that point, it became simply local roads.

== Major intersections ==
The entire route was in Waukesha County.

Location	mi	km	Destinations	Notes
Pewaukee	0.0	0.0	WIS 190 to WIS 164 – Milwaukee; CTH-F	Roadway continued as CTH-F
Menomonee Falls	10.2	16.4	WIS 175 (Appleton Street)	
Menomonee Falls	11.68	18.80	US 41 / US 45 / WIS 100 west – Milwaukee, Fond du Lac WIS 100 east (Main Street)	Roadway continued as eastbound WIS 100
1.000 mi = 1.609 km; 1.000 km = 0.621 mi
