= Hale Interchange =

Interchange in Milwaukee, Wisconsin

Location
- Greenfield, Wisconsin
- Coordinates: 42.963358°N 88.0381445°W
- Roads at junction: I-41 / US 41; I-43; I-894; US 45

Construction
- Type: Directional T interchange
- Maintained by: Wisconsin Department of Transportation

The Hale Interchange is the major interchange between Interstate 41 (I-41), I-43, I-894, US Highway 41 (US 41), and US 45 in the Milwaukee, Wisconsin, southwest suburb of Greenfield, though it takes it name from the nearby community of Hales Corners.

== Description ==
The Hale Interchange is designed as a directional T interchange that serves I-41, I-43, I-894, US 41, and US 45. I-41 south/I-43 north/I-894 east/US 41 south (Airport Freeway) first heads eastward toward Downtown Milwaukee and Chicago. The freeway is also the direct route to get to Mitchell International Airport. I-43 south (Rock Freeway) heads west from the Hale to Beloit. I-41 north/I-894 west/US 41 north/US 45 north (Zoo Freeway) heads toward Madison and Fond du Lac although those control cities are not signed in the interchange on I-894 itself. US 45 south runs for a mile with I-43 south before exiting at exit 60 onto Wisconsin Highway 100 (108th Street) heading to Hales Corners. The interchange is I-894 exit number 4.

== History ==
The interchange was built in 1966. At first, it served I-894 and US 45. In 1969, the interchange then served the WIS 15 freeway (now part of I-43 since 1988). As of 1994, the interchange handled 151,800 cars per day, and two of the bridges within the interchange were expected to be redecked and widened in 1995 and 1998.

In 1996 the seven towers supporting the interchange were evaluated, by ultrasonic nondestructive testing, and found to be in acceptable condition.

The Southeastern Wisconsin Regional Planning Commission (SEWRPC)'s 30-year plan, of 2005, anticipated replacement of the interchange in the 2016-2020 period, as part of a "Phase 2" in which the Zoo Interchange would also be replaced; a 2011 study recommended postponing the Hale interchange reconstruction to a "Phase 3" instead to avoid unacceptable congestion during construction periods.

In 2015, US 41 was rerouted onto I-894 and US 45 freeway. This was done in response to the establishment of Interstate 41 which travels along the new US 41 alignment.

== See also ==
- List of road interchanges in the United States
