= Zoo Interchange =

Freeway interchange in Wisconsin

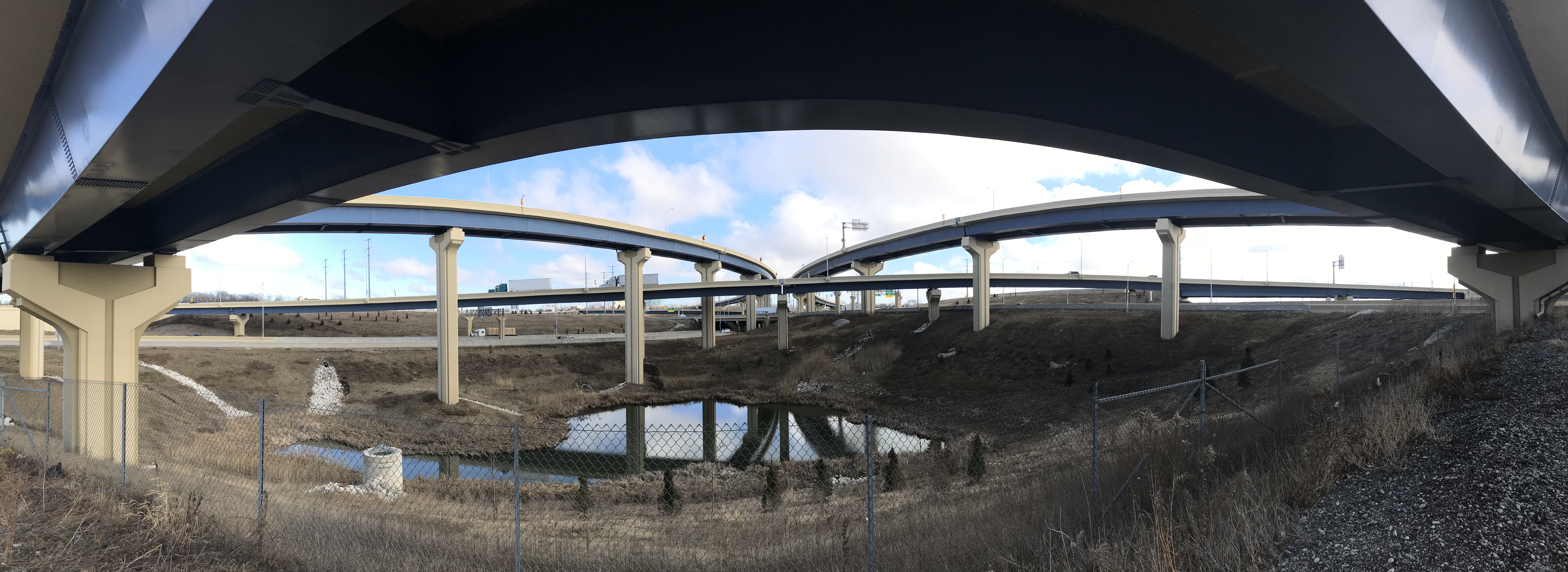
- Surface street panorama of the Zoo Interchange
- Interactive map of Zoo Interchange

Location
- Milwaukee, Wisconsin
- Coordinates: 43°01′39″N 88°02′04″W
- Roads at junction: I-41 / US 41; I-94; I-894; US 45

Construction
- Type: Stack interchange
- Opened: 1963
- Maintained by: WisDOT

The Zoo Interchange is a freeway interchange on the west side of Milwaukee Wisconsin, United States. It forms the junction of Interstate 94 (I-94, East–West Freeway), I-894, I-41, US Highway 41 (US 41) and US 45 (Zoo Freeway). It is the busiest and one of the oldest interchanges in the state. It is nicknamed as such because of the Milwaukee County Zoo located on the northwest quadrant of the interchange. The control cities at the interchange are Downtown Milwaukee to the east, Chicago to the south, Madison to the west and Fond du Lac to the north.

Originally completed in 1963, the interchange was a major component in the freeway system being developed in Milwaukee and southeastern Wisconsin and formed an important link with the Interstate Highway System. The design included exits on both the left and right sides of the roadways, and drivers exited depending which side their destination road was located. Owing to the dangers of this design and the deterioration of the interchange, a reconstruction was considered in the early 2000s. Plans set reconstruction in 2015, but it was advanced by Governor Jim Doyle to 2012, then delayed due to lack of available funding. Work finally began in 2014 with an expected completion in 2018. However, further budget issues delayed the completion (as of September 2018) until 2022.

The complexity and scale of the reconstruction project necessitated advanced methods of construction. It marked the first time that Wisconsin used drilled shaft foundations to build bridge supports and the first time that 3D computer modelling was used. In 2014 the interchange became the first place in the United States where orange pavement markings were tested.

The interchange reconstruction has sparked much controversy and political polarization. Opponents have criticized its extremely high $1.7 billion cost. It also continues the area trend of investing heavily in freeways while disinvesting in all other forms of transportation. This resulted in the Milwaukee Innercity Congregations Allied for Hope and the Black Health Coalition of Wisconsin filing a lawsuit against the department of transportation in 2012. It was resolved in 2014 with the state agreeing to give additional aid to the public transit system.

== History ==
=== Freeway system construction, post World War II to the 1960s ===
Following the end of World War II, the city of Milwaukee began experiencing economic and population growth. Traffic on the city streets doubled from 1945 to 1952. There was a perception of the roads being overloaded resulting in long delays and increased accidents. In 1951, the city hired consultants Amman and Whitney to do a traffic study and find a solution that would satisfy the city's needs for the increasing traffic. The firm recommended the construction of a 20.4-mile (32.8 km) freeway system, which was approved by the city in 1952 and began in 1953. A major component of the new highway system was the Zoo Interchange, located to the west of downtown. By the summer of 1963, work crews were in a rush to have the interchange finished by the end of that year's construction season, resulting in its completion that fall. The interchange formed a major connection between the Milwaukee area freeways and the rest of the Interstate Highway System, and its completion was regarded as a milestone for the Milwaukee highway system. Engineers had debated between a right-hand-only design and a directional design, but ultimately chose the directional. This design featured entrance and exit ramps on both sides, such that drivers going to a roadway on the left exited to the left and drivers going to a roadway on the right exited to the right. The maximum capacity was 115,000 vehicles per day.

=== Interchange rebuild proposal, 2003–2008 ===
By 2003, the freeways in Milwaukee and the greater southeastern Wisconsin area were approaching the end of their useful life. Following a study, the Southeast Wisconsin Regional Planning Committee presented several plans, with the recommended being to expand the system over the next 30 years. A key feature of the plan was to widen mainline freeways to include more lanes. It was claimed this would reduce the congestion problem. The plan also included numerous changes for interchanges, including the Zoo Interchange. The directional interchange style had become deprecated due to safety concerns and a lack of efficiency caused by vehicles that had to move across the highway in both directions. The plan therefore called for all exits to be relocated to the right side. It also suggested reducing lane endings at interchanges and reconfiguring ramps to allow for travel at a higher speed. WisDOT originally planned to begin working on the Zoo Interchange after a rebuild of I-94 from Milwaukee to the state line had been completed. This was estimated to be in 2015. However in 2006, Governor Jim Doyle announced a new plan to begin construction in 2012. Doyle stated that advancing the project would benefit the economy of the region and create new jobs. The new timeline called for an environmental and engineering study to occur from 2007 to 2008 and final design development and land acquisition to occur from 2009 to 2011. Doyle asked for $28 million (equivalent to $41.8 million in 2025) in the 2007–2008 budget to begin this process. The original estimate for the cost was $1.1 billion (equivalent to $1.64 billion in 2025), although it was expected to go up to $2.6 billion (equivalent to $3.88 billion in 2025). Residents worried that the advancement of the work would also advance a proposed plan to widen the freeway between the Zoo and Marquette interchanges, which was opposed by the neighborhoods that would be encroached upon. The advanced timeline of the Zoo Interchange was not expected to have an effect on other projects that it would now be happening concurrently with, including the rebuilding of the Marquette Interchange and the rebuild of I-94.

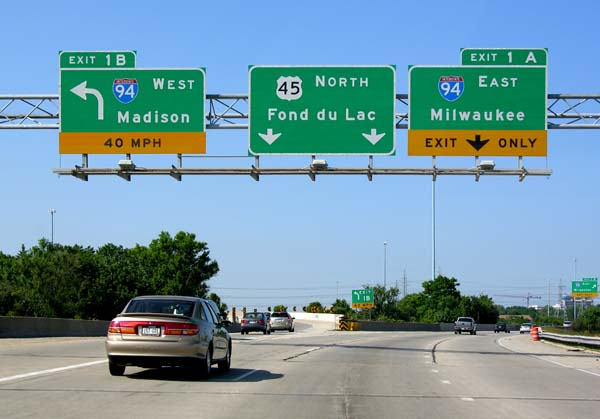
Zoo Interchange at the western terminus of I-894 in 2008, looking north

=== Preliminary planning and delay, 2008 ===
In 2008, the interchange handled a traffic volume of 345,900 vehicles per day, three times its original design capacity. The rate of accidents was two to three times higher than the state average. After concluding its engineering study, WisDOT announced three possible plans for the interchange. One option was to rebuild the interchange in place, keeping the design the same at a cost of $960 million (equivalent to $1.41 billion in 2025). This would fix the deteriorating state of the infrastructure but would not do anything about the left-hand exits or traffic congestion. A second option was to do a full rebuild of the interchange, replacing outdated features to improve safety and widening it to six lanes, with a cost of $2.16 billion (equivalent to $3.17 billion in 2025). The third option was a full rebuild with widening to eight lanes. The estimated cost was $2.31 billion (equivalent to $3.39 billion in 2025). The department decided to eliminate the basic rebuild option as it would not address all of the problems. Suburban area legislators favored the eight-lane expansion, as they believed it would prepare for future traffic needs. However, the state's 2009–2011 budget did not include enough money for the project. Only $20 million (equivalent to $29.1 million in 2025) was allocated while preparatory tasks including acquiring land, relocating utilities, and designing the first phase were estimated to cost $195 million (equivalent to $284 million in 2025). Governor Doyle backed off of his original plan, acknowledging that the state would not have enough money to do the Zoo Interchange until the I-94 reconstruction was completed. The estimated start date was moved to 2016.

=== Deficient bridges, 2009–2010 ===
An inspection in August 2009 found three bridges in the interchange to be structurally deficient. Weight restrictions were posted for the bridges and state troopers and sheriffs deputies were assigned to enforce them. However, the volume of traffic in the interchange made enforcement difficult, and sensors installed on one bridge recorded 1,600 overweight vehicles crossing the bridge every week. In December, WisDOT began bidding for a contract to replace the bridges. The only bid was submitted by Milwaukee Constructors LLC, a joint venture of three companies. Working with the contractor, the department developed plans to construct new bridges next to the old ones. Traffic would continue to use the old bridges until the new ones were completed. Following completion, traffic would be shifted to the new bridges. The project was estimated to cost $15.3 million (equivalent to $22.3 million in 2025). In March 2010, severe cracking was discovered on one of the deficient bridges. Several existing cracks had become longer and a new two-foot-long (0.61 m) crack was found. The ramp that used the bridge was closed and traffic was detoured onto the city streets. The other bridges remained open. The closure was expected to affect 42,000 drivers per day and last for two months until the replacement bridge was completed.

=== Final planning and lawsuit, 2012–2014 ===
In February 2012, WisDOT announced the final design for the interchange. Due to public opposition to most of the options proposed, the department had taken components from several designs to develop the reduced impacts alternative, which was chosen. This design was a complete rebuild of the interchange, but with less land use and environmental impacts than other options. The estimated cost was $1.71 billion (equivalent to $2.37 billion in 2025). Preliminary changes on surrounding roads would begin in 2013 to prepare them for expected increased traffic during the interchange work. The work on the interchange would begin in 2014. However, a lawsuit was filed in August 2012 attempting to rein in the capacity expansion component of the plan on the grounds that it would have a discriminatory effect. The plaintiffs, representing inner-city minorities, alleged that the money being spent on the interchange would only benefit people with cars, namely those who lived in the generally White suburbs, while negatively impacting inner-city minorities. A ruling in May 2013 required WisDOT to conduct a study on the effects of the interchange project on suburban sprawl and transit-dependent populations. Expansion of the highways on the approach to the Zoo Interchange were blocked from proceeding until the study was completed. The case continued to court-sanctioned mediation where a settlement was reached in May 2014. WisDOT agreed to pay $13.5 million (equivalent to $18.1 million in 2025) for public transit improvements in the region.

=== Core construction, 2014–2018 ===
The American Transmission Company began relocating overhead power lines in June 2013 in order to accommodate the new interchange design. Eight 138,000-volt wires over an 11-mile (18 km) stretch were relocated. By March 2014, work was under way on surface streets in the area. This included the widening of Wisconsin Highway 100 (WIS 100) and Watertown Plank Road. The contract for the first phase of the interchange core was awarded in August 2014. The lowest bid of $198.8 million (equivalent to $266 million in 2025) and was submitted by a joint venture of Lunda Construction Co., Michels Corporation, and Edgerton Contractors Inc. This was $28.6 million (equivalent to $38.3 million in 2025) lower than the only other bid submitted. Work on the core began in December 2014. Plans for the phase focused primarily on adding new lanes to the approaches to the core. In February 2015, Ryan Calkins, a construction worker for Michels Corp., was killed in an accident at the worksite. It was reported that he was trapped by heavy machinery. His death was the first on any of the major projects in the Milwaukee area. Bidding for the second phase of the core occurred in September 2015. The winning bid was $314 million (equivalent to $416 million in 2025), submitted by Walsh Construction, the company that had been beat in bidding for the first phase. A total of three bids were submitted. The contract included work until August 2018.

=== Core completion and north leg delay, 2018–2022 ===
The 2017–2019 state budget featured a decrease of $292 million (equivalent to $377 million in 2025) in the amount allocated for large highway projects in the Milwaukee region compared to the previous biennium's budget. Under this budget, completion of the north leg of the interchange was delayed by two years. This compounded on a two-year delay introduced in the previous budget, moving the completion date to 2022 from the originally planned 2018. The core of the interchange was still expected to be completed on time. In June 2018, the ramp from I-94 west to I-894 south opened, marking the completion of the last major structure in the core of the interchange. The ramp had been the first to close and remained so for three and a half years. After its reconstruction, the ramp became the tallest part of the interchange at 100 feet (30 m). Finishing work on the core continued through August.\

== Design ==
WisDOT proposed several possible courses of action and designs for the interchange reconstruction. The problems that a new design should address were identified as: the deteriorating condition of the interchange, the dangers of the left side exits, the volume of traffic using the interchange, and traffic volumes expected in the future.

=== No-build alternatives ===
The no-build alternatives did not involve any construction work being done on the interchange. The first was to simply do nothing. This was eliminated because it did not solve any of the problems. The second was to improve public mass transit in the region. It included doubling the revenue miles of existing transit systems and establishing new transit systems. This would reduce traffic in the interchange, reducing congestion and extending the structure's life, but it was eliminated because it would not fix safety problems, nor address WisDOT's traffic volumes projections. The third alternative was to improve traffic management with HOV lanes, new driver messaging boards, increased patrols, and improved access to traffic information. This option was eliminated because it did not solve most of the problems.

=== Build alternatives ===
The build alternatives involved construction work on the interchange. The first was to replace all of the roadways and structures in the interchange. This would solve the deterioration of the interchange, but would not fix safety or congestion problems, as it would retain the same design. The second option was to make spot improvements to the interchange. This would include repair or replacement of structures and pavement where necessary and reconfiguration of some service roads to improve access and safety. This was eliminated because it did not fix traffic congestion and did not fully solve all of the problems.

=== Modernization alternative ===
The "modernization" alternatives involved completely rebuilding and reconfiguring the interchange to new standards. Two similar versions of a modernization design were proposed. These designs featured all exits on the right, full shoulders on all mainlines and ramps, two lanes on some ramps, and smoother curves to allow greater speed. The primary difference was the number of lanes through the interchange; one design had six, and the other had eight. The six-lane variant was eliminated because it was not expected to adequately handle future traffic volumes, as predicted by WisDOT. The eight-lane variant would theoretically solve all of the problems, and was favored by the department, but it faced opposition by the public because of high costs and environmental impacts. Following public hearings, this design was eliminated.

=== Reduced impacts alternative ===
Based on input from the public, WisDOT took components from several of the eliminated designs to develop a new option, called the reduced impacts alternative. This design was still intended to solve all of the problems, but would have a lower cost, less environmental impact, and require significantly less property and utility relocations. The design would have only four lanes on I-94, but included 18-foot (5.5 m) shoulders that would allow it to be increased to six lanes in the future. The design also reduced the number of levels from five to four and eliminated a loop ramp. As the new design would not work with plans for the approach legs from other designs, reduced impacts alternative plans were also developed for each leg.

== Construction methods ==
The supports for the bridges were built using large diameter drilled shafts. The shafts were 8–10 feet (2.4–3.0 m) in diameter and 60–100 feet (18–30 m) deep. The Zoo Interchange was the first project in Wisconsin to use drilled shafts. The use of this method instead of pilings allowed for easier traffic rerouting, reduced installation time, less utility conflicts, less noise and vibrations, and cost savings.

The bridges were built with two side-by-side steel tub girders. This design allowed longer bridges to be built while using fewer lifts, as well as maintaining uniformity with the Marquette and Mitchell interchanges. Because of the 31 million pounds (14,000,000 kg) of steel needed for the project, WisDOT held meetings with steel fabricators and construction contractors to understand the necessary logistics. It was determined that contractors would need to buy from at least two steel manufacturers to obtain the necessary quantity. A bill of materials was released in advance, giving contractors two to three months to obtain the steel before the work was scheduled to begin. Six 31-hour windows were scheduled for installing beams, and deliveries of beams were coordinated to occur during off-peak traffic times. The use of chainfalls to guide the beams into place and bigger cranes than expected reduced the time needed to install beams to 12–15 hours per window.

The project marked the first use of 3D modeling software by WisDOT. The department obtained laser mapping units, new desktop, laptop, and tablet computers, and GPS rovers in preparation of the project. Two terabytes of data were generated from surveying the site. Computer-generated models of the new interchange design could then be created. The models were uploaded to GPS rovers at the site which used them to search for any conflicts with utilities. Data collected by the rovers was then entered into the modeling software so conflicts could be resolved. Finished models were shared with contractors so they would not have to make their own. Model data was also used for automated machine guidance during construction.

== Paint testing ==
In December 2014, the Zoo Interchange became a test site for orange pavement markings. On December 2, white and yellow lines were replaced with orange lines at three places in the interchange. The testing was in response to reports of salt residue making lines in the work zone difficult to see in the winter. This was especially problematic where lanes shifted. Orange was chosen because it would be easier to see and matched the color of construction signs and barrels. This was the first time orange markings were used in the United States, although they had already been used successfully in other countries. The project required approval from the Federal Highway Administration (FHWA), which originally granted an 18-month test period. This was later extended through the end of the interchange construction. As orange paint would be hard for a contractor to find, and excess could not be used anywhere else, WisDOT decided to supply the paint to contractors. Orange epoxy paint was purchased from a manufacturer in Canada and used for the first test. However, by the end of the summer, the paint had faded to yellow. A water-based latex paint was tested next, but this was worn away during the winter. The department therefore decided to use latex paint in the summer and epoxy paint in the winter. Orange tape markings were also tested. A survey of drivers found that 75% liked the orange markings and 25% did not. It was reported that no decrease in worksite accidents was found as a result of the orange markings, but there also was not an increase.

== Lawsuit ==
=== Background ===
In August 2012, a lawsuit was filed against the state and federal departments of transportation, alleging that the project was discriminatory. The suit was filed in the district court in Madison by lawyers from the American Civil Liberties Union of Wisconsin and the Midwest Environmental Advocates on behalf of the Milwaukee Innercity Congregations Allied for Hope and the Black Health Coalition of Wisconsin. The plaintiffs argued that the huge amounts of money being spent on expanding the freeways at the interchange would only benefit commuters from the mainly White suburbs. Urban minorities, who generally did not have cars, would receive no benefit from the expenditure. Further, state aid to the public transit that these groups relied on had been decreasing. The results of these decreases included the Milwaukee County Transit System eliminating 25 bus routes and making reductions to other routes. The suit also argued that the expansion would increase air pollution. In the region, respiratory diseases from air pollution already had higher occurrence rates among minorities than Whites. The plaintiffs did not oppose the reconstruction of the interchange, but did not want any capacity expansion. They instead wanted the money allocated for expansion to be spent on improvements to public transit.

=== Preliminary ruling ===
In May 2013, the court issued an interim ruling in the case. The ruling prevented construction from proceeding until studies on its effects had been completed. The court required the state to perform two studies. The first would look at the environmental effects of expanding the interchange's capacity, especially if future traffic volumes did not meet the state's estimate. The second would look at the social and economical effects on minorities of expanding the interchange's capacity while public transit remained unsupported. Both studies were expected to encompass the entire region. Once the studies were completed, the state would be free to choose whatever course of action it wanted, including continuing with the plan to expand the interchange and allow public transit to decline. However, the decision makers would be required to consider the results of the studies first. The defendant agencies challenged that the studies should only be required in the immediate area of the interchange. This argument was rejected by the court; they believed that the project could have effects on the entire region, not just the areas around the interchange, and the state needed to take these into consideration as well. As the ruling was interim, the case continued to court facilitated mediation before the suit was settled.

=== Resolution ===
In May 2014, the two sides reached an agreement in mediation. Under the agreement, WisDOT would pay $13.5 million (equivalent to $18.1 million in 2025) over four years for transit services in the Milwaukee area. This would be allocated as $11.5 million (equivalent to $15.4 million in 2025) to develop and operate new bus routes, with a focus on routes designed to connect Milwaukee to its suburbs, and $2 million (equivalent to $2.68 million in 2025) to make enhancements to transit services. Following the settlement, the Milwaukee County Transit Committee began planning Route 279, a new express bus route that would run from central Milwaukee to Menomonee Falls. The new route would cost $245,000 in 2014 and $668,000 in 2015 (equivalent to $327,734 and $885,313 in 2025) and would be the first new route funded with the settlement money. After the four years of state funding, ridership on all the new routes would have to be analyzed to determine if it would be viable for the county to continue operating them.

== Controversy and criticism ==
The $1.7 billion dollar cost of rebuilding the interchange used two years worth of the state's budget for highway repairs and 15 years worth of public transit aid. It also resulted in a $250 million cut from the University of Wisconsin System and a decrease in aid for local road repairs. The choice to expand the capacity of the interchange greatly increased the cost, with a simple rebuild estimated at only $900 million.

Many residents opposed the plans made by WisDOT for arterial street widenings prior to the interchange reconstruction. Plans included expanding Blue Mound Road in Wauwatosa to ten lanes, including three through lanes and three left turn lanes. This would eliminate on street parking, which would present challenges to local businesses. The intersecting Mayfair Road would be increased to 11 lanes. Already considered one of the busiest in the state, the intersection would see a major increase in traffic volume. Area residents feared the increased traffic would create safety hazards and overflow into the surrounding neighborhoods. Similar expansion plans on Wisconsin Avenue would cut into residential properties along the street.

The city of Wauwatosa has suffered adverse effects from the volumes of traffic being diverted onto the city streets by the construction. The number of vehicles on the streets increased by between 63 and 109 percent from what it was before the construction. A 2016 survey conducted by the city found that residents were concerned by the amount of traffic. The higher traffic volumes increased wear on the streets and prevented the city from doing a rebuild of North Avenue. The delay of completion of the north leg has caused concern for city officials as it interfered with plans for work on North Avenue, requiring further postponement of improvements to the deteriorating road. In February 2017, the city council sent a letter to the state legislature requesting that the completion not be delayed. The traffic issues lead to the city rejecting an application from Chick-fil-A in the spring of 2023 to open a new restaurant on Mayfair Road in fear of that chain's unusually large overall traffic per location.

== Politics ==
The Zoo Interchange reconstruction has showcased the conflict of political ideas in the Milwaukee metropolitan area. Studies have found the area to be one of the most segregated in the country, with almost all minorities living in the city and the suburbs primarily White. Residents of the suburbs advocate in favor of highways while not supporting any other form of transportation. Residents of the city want a more diverse transportation system. The Republican suburbs have gained power in regional politics and pushed their transportation ideas, leading to proposals for bus lanes and several types of rail systems being vetoed. Following the bridge closure at the Zoo Interchange, county executive Scott Walker criticized Governor Doyle and Milwaukee Mayor Tom Barrett for supporting an $810 million (equivalent to $1.17 billion in 2025) rail line when the highway infrastructure was so deteriorated. After being elected governor, Walker allocated huge amounts of money to freeway megaprojects, exemplified by the $1.7 billion Zoo Interchange reconstruction. Residents of the city have complained that this is excessive, and the costs of the projects are not justified by the claimed few minutes of time saved by car commuters, especially while local road aid and education have received funding cuts. The city's opposition to the highway only idea of the suburbs culminated with the 2012 lawsuit, forcing the state to give more money to public transit.

In 1997, Milwaukee County legislators attempted to create a compromise that would support both transportation visions. An extensive study of numerous options revealed that legislators were divided into two distinct groups. One wanted only freeways, the other wanted only alternative transit options. A $1.86 billion (equivalent to $3.46 billion in 2025) deal was proposed that would benefit both groups. It would give $460 million (equivalent to $856 million in 2025) to rebuild the Marquette Interchange and $610 million (equivalent to $1.13 billion in 2025) for the Zoo Interchange and other I-94 improvements. It would also give $250 million (equivalent to $465 million in 2025) for constructing HOV and bus lanes, $444 million (equivalent to $818 million in 2025) for a light rail system, and $90 million (equivalent to $167 million in 2025) to improve bus service. Under this plan, the Marquette Interchange would have been rebuilt from 2001 to 2004, the light rail would have been constructed from 2002 to 2006, and the Zoo Interchange rebuild and other freeway work would have occurred from 2008 to 2013. However, disputes arose about how each component of the project would be paid for, with each group trying to block funding for the other's concessions. The compromise eventually fell apart and each group began to work individually to push their own agenda.
