= Muirdale Tuberculosis Sanatorium =

- U.S. National Register of Historic Places
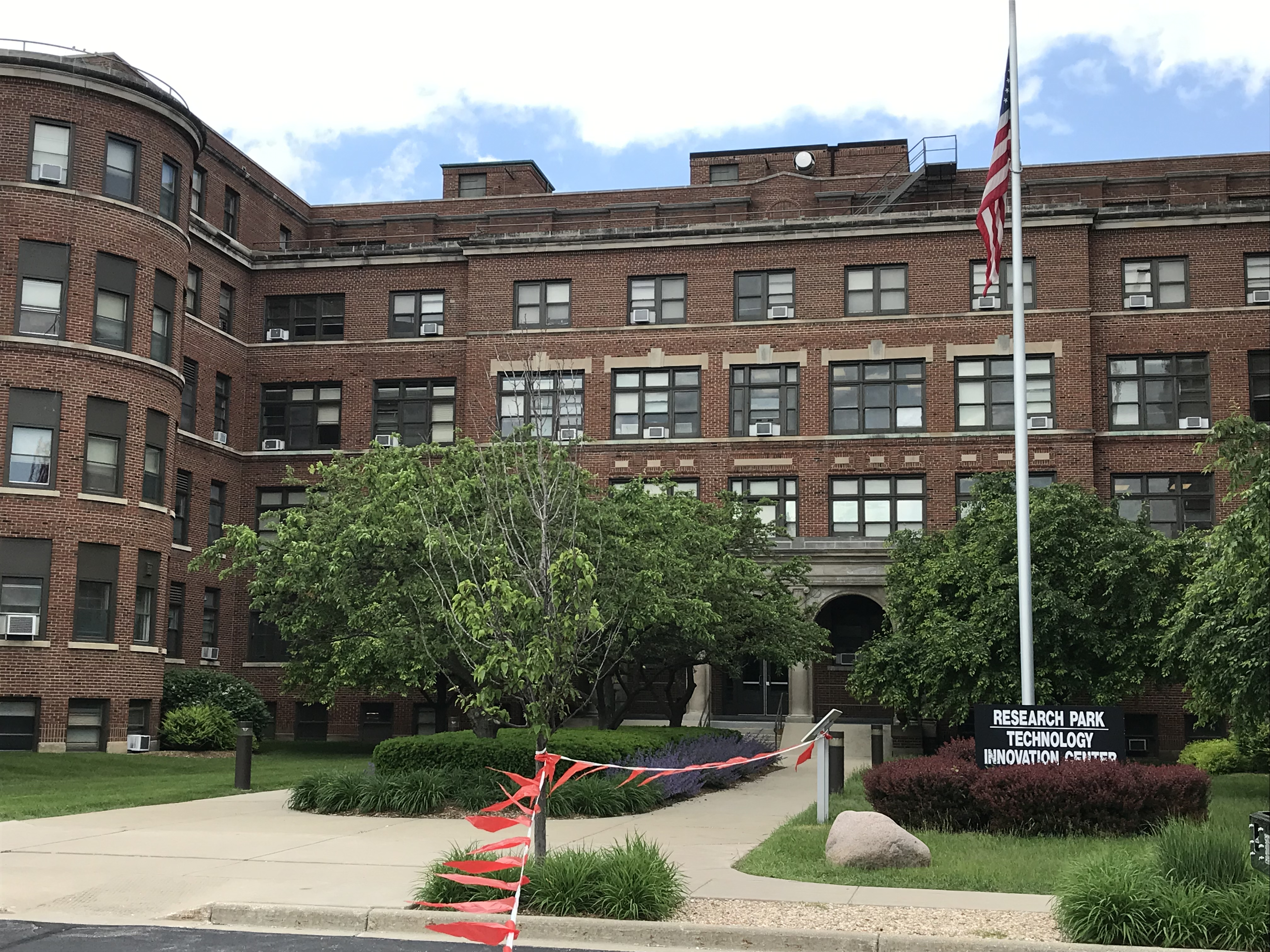
- The building in 2022, used as the Technology Innovation Center at Milwaukee County Research Park

- Location within Wisconsin
- Location: 10437 & 10457 W. Innovation Dr., Wauwatosa, Wisconsin
- Coordinates: 43°2′37″N 88°2′40″W
- Built: 1915
- Architect: Robert Messmer
- NRHP reference No.: 100002857
- Added to NRHP: August 31, 2018

Muirdale Tuberculosis Sanatorium, also called Muirdale Tuberculosis Hospital, was built in 1914–15 by Milwaukee County, Wisconsin. It was located near the corner of Highway 100 and Watertown Plank Road in Wauwatosa and named after noted Wisconsin naturalist John Muir. Maximum capacity in 1923 was 350 patients, but in later years this figure rose to over 600, including a 100-bed Children's Cottage, or Preventorium, devoted to the treatment of young children.

== Origins ==
In 1913, recognizing that available local facilities for treating tubercular patients were inadequate, the Milwaukee County Board of Supervisors authorized an expenditure of $600,000 for the construction of a modern tuberculosis hospital to be located on a 1,200-acre tract of county-owned land just west of Wauwatosa, later deemed the Milwaukee County Grounds. Messmer & Bros. Architects were contracted to draw up building plans in consultation with Dr. Hoyt E. Dearholt, executive secretary of the Wisconsin Anti-Tuberculosis Association. The resulting design departed from the commonly accepted single or two-story "cottage" concept and replaced it with a central three-story hospital and administration building, the first of its kind in the United States and a model for all TB sanatoriums to follow.

Construction of Muirdale began in 1914 and on November 15, 1915, the first patients were admitted, initially transfers from the Social Workers and Greenfield sanatoriums. In 1916 Milwaukee County appropriated an additional $55,000 for construction of a sixty-bed "Cottage for Children".

In 1922, Bluemound Sanatorium, a privately run institution for tubercular patients, was acquired by Milwaukee County and was operated as an annex for convalescing Muirdale patients. A year later it was redesignated a Children's Preventorium for the treatment of children between the ages of 4 and 14. It had a capacity of 136 beds. The County eventually closed this facility in 1939.

Between 1915 and 1935, over 10,000 tubercular patients had received treatment at Muirdale.

By the mid-1930s, thoracic surgery had become an increasingly important option in the treatment of tuberculosis. To provide more operating space, two additional stories were added to Muirdale's main hospital and administration building. Construction began in the fall of 1935 and was completed by January 1937.

== Closing ==
Muirdale ceased treating tuberculosis patients in 1970 and, although the main structure still remains, many of the outlying buildings and "cottages" were razed. It was renamed Rehab West in the 1970s and functioned as a care facility for elderly persons with mental illnesses but was permanently closed in 1978. The facility, which had been slated for destruction in June 1992, was saved due to the efforts of historical preservationists and is now being used as part of the Milwaukee County Research Park, a business incubator. It is now known as the "Technology Innovation Center" and is listed on a registry of haunted landmarks.

The surviving buildings were listed on the National Register of Historic Places in 2018.

== Research materials ==
The Milwaukee County Historical Society retains some records related to Muirdale, including historical information, annual reports published in 1922 and 1966–1970, audit reports from 1963 to 1974 and a two-volume patient registration record listing the names of all those admitted to the sanatorium between 1941 and 1962.

The University of Wisconsin Milwaukee Library has three videocassettes in its archives of motion picture film taken by Eugene Millmann between 1926 and 1972. The clips, mostly shot during the 1920s and 1930s in both B&W and color, were transferred to videotape from the original 16mm film and include footage of Muirdale Sanatorium.
