= Mitchell Interchange =

Interchange in Milwaukee, Wisconsin

Location
- Milwaukee, Wisconsin
- Coordinates: 42.9620°N 87.93493°W
- Roads at junction: I-41 / US 41; I-43; I-94; I-894

Construction
- Type: Semi-directional Y interchange
- Maintained by: WisDOT

The Mitchell Interchange is a major interchange on the south side of Milwaukee, Wisconsin, for Interstate 41 (I-41), U.S. Highway 41 (US 41), I-43, I-94, and I-894. It is named for its proximity to General Mitchell International Airport. I-94 is the North–South Freeway. I-894 is the Airport Freeway. I-41/US 41 travels south and west of the interchange. I-43 travels west and north of the interchange.

== Description ==
=== Features ===
The primary features of the reconstructed interchange are three tunnels. The use of tunnels instead of bridges was chosen because it reduced the height of the interchange, allowed for fewer closures, and reduced the cost of the reconstruction project by $10 million. The tunnels feature an advanced lighting system. The brightness of the lights is adjusted based on the conditions outside to give drivers a smooth transition in and out of the tunnels. There are standpipes to aid in firefighting inside the tunnels. The tunnels measure 585 feet (178 m), 744 feet (227 m), and 650 feet (198 m) in length.

=== Designations ===
The control cities at the interchange are Downtown Milwaukee to the north, Chicago to the south and a combination of Beloit, Madison and Fond du Lac to the west. Since I-41 was signed in 2015, it goes north from I-94/US 41 north to I-894 west at Mitchell Interchange, and I-41 south goes from I-43 north/I-894 east to I-94 east; US 41 follows I-41.

== History ==
The Mitchell Interchange opened in 1966; its original design consisted of seven roadway bridges, serving only I-94 and I-894. By 1988, I-43 was extended southwest through this interchange. In 1999, US 41 was rerouted onto I-94 in the Milwaukee metropolitan area. In 2015, US 41 was rerouted onto I-894, bypassing Downtown Milwaukee, and was paired with the newly-established I-41.

=== Reconstruction ===
In 2009 a complete reconstruction of the interchange began as part of WisDOT's I-94 North-South Reconstruction Program.

Contracts for preparation work were awarded in 2009 and 2010. The contract for the interchange itself was awarded in the summer of 2010. The main feature of the new interchange design was three tunnels. All three were built using the cut and cover top down-method. Secant pile drilled shafts were used to build walls into the ground. These walls acted as braces while the area in between them was excavated to form the tunnel. A roof was then built between the walls, making them permanent sidewalls of the tunnels. In order to maintain traffic flow, the tunnels were built in sections. After completion of a section, a roadway was relocated over it to make space for the next section to be built. Other work on the project included the construction of thirteen new bridges and the installation of retaining walls. The fast pace of the project required work to be done seven days a week.

The reconstruction was completed in November 2012. Several former movements changed after completion. Northbound I-94 to westbound I-894/I-43 changed from a left-hand exit bridge to a right-hand exit tunnel under I-94. Collector-distributor lanes were added along both sides of I-94 from College Avenue to South 13th Street. The movement from eastbound I-894/I-41/I-43 to northbound I-94/I-43 also changed from a left-hand exit to a right-hand exit before Wisconsin Highway 241 (WIS 241). This ramp is also a tunnel under I-94. The reconstruction was named as one of Roads & Bridges magazine's top ten projects of 2012.
