= Wisconsin Highway 36 =

State highway in Wisconsin, United States

State Trunk Highway 36
- WIS 36; mainline in red, business route in blue

Route information
- Maintained by WisDOT
- Length: 35.89 mi (57.76 km)

Major junctions
- South end: WIS 120 in Springfield
- US 45 / WIS 100 in Franklin; I-41 / I-43 / I-894 / US 41 in Greenfield
- North end: WIS 241 in Milwaukee

Location
- Country: United States
- State: Wisconsin
- Counties: Walworth, Racine, Waukesha, Milwaukee

Highway system
- Wisconsin State Trunk Highway System; Interstate; US; State; Scenic; Rustic
← WIS 35	→ WIS 37

State Trunk Highway 36 (often called Highway 36, STH-36 or WIS 36) is a state highway in the U.S. state of Wisconsin. It runs in a diagonal southwest–northeast direction across southeastern Wisconsin from Springfield which is north of Lake Geneva to Milwaukee.

== Route description ==
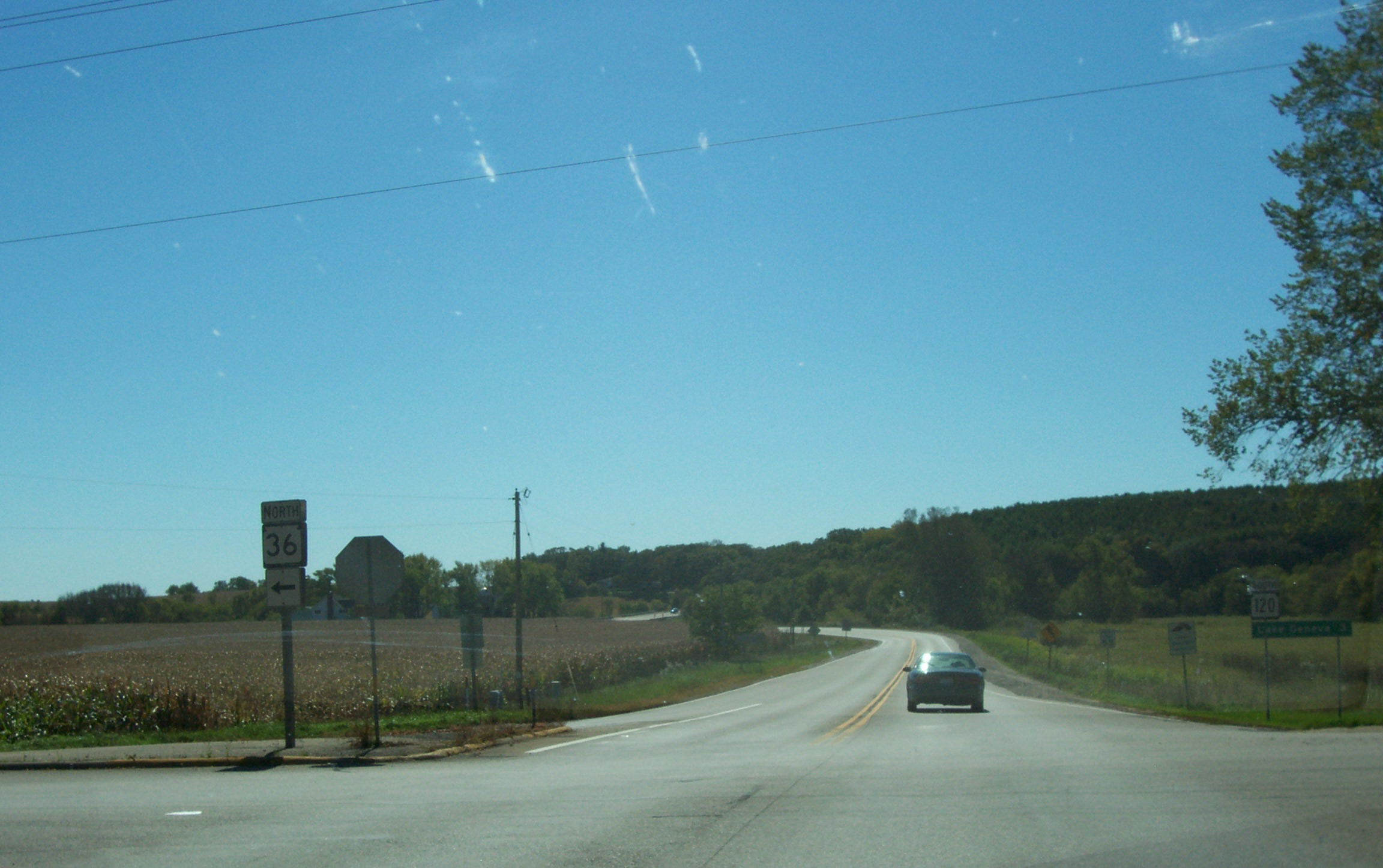
Southwest terminus of WIS 36 from WIS 120 near Springfield

WIS 36 begins at its intersection with WIS 120 and travels in a general northeasterly direction to an intersection with WIS 11 in Burlington. The road continues northeast, passing through Waterford where it connects with WIS 164, then to Wind Lake and Muskego before heading to Franklin, where it runs concurrently with US Highway 45 (US 45) for a short distance, and crosses WIS 100. The highway then follows Loomis Road through Greendale and Greenfield, where it intersects with Interstate 43 (I-43) and I-894 before terminating at WIS 241 in Milwaukee.

== History ==
WIS 36 is unusual in that its route has seen few changes since it was designated in 1918. The road originally began in Lake Geneva, approximately four miles (6.4 km) south of its current terminus, and ended near downtown Milwaukee. In 1921, the route was shortened to end at the junction with what was then WIS 57, which later became US 41, and is now WIS 241. In 1919, WIS 36 was extended to the west along WIS 50 to Williams Bay, then turned to the south into Walworth County to join WIS 89 (now US 14) to its end at the Illinois state line.

The route would change again in 1968; WIS 36 terminated at Lake Geneva, and the portion from Williams Bay to Walworth was redesignated as WIS 67. Later, in 1987–1988, WIS 120 was extended north from Lake Geneva via WIS 36 to Springfield, and then north along County Trunk Highway G (CTH-G) toward East Troy, placing the end of the highway at its present location.

The Burlington Bypass was first proposed in the 1990s around the south of the city. It was completed in 2010 at a cost of $118 million. The route was built out as a four lane roadway, as a result of a major overestimate in the amount of projected traffic. For this reason, it was included in WisPIRGs list of highway boondoggles.

== Major intersections ==
County	Location	mi	km	Destinations	Notes
Walworth	Springfield			WIS 120 – East Troy, Lake Geneva	Southern terminus
Walworth	Lyons			WIS 11 west – Elkhorn	Southern end of WIS 11 concurrency
Racine	Burlington			WIS 83 south – Salem Lakes	Southern end of WIS 83 concurrency
Racine	Burlington			WIS 142 east – Kenosha	
Racine	Browns Lake			WIS 11 east – Racine	Northern end of WIS 11 concurrency
Racine	Rochester			WIS 20 / WIS 83 north – Waterford, Racine	Northern end of WIS 83 concurrency
Racine	Waterford			WIS 164 north – Big Bend, Waukesha	
Waukesha	Muskego			US 45 south – Union Grove	Southern end of US 45 concurrency
Milwaukee	Franklin			US 45 north / WIS 100 (St. Martins Road) – Hales Corners	Northern end of US 45 concurrency
Milwaukee	Greenfield			I-41 / I-43 / I-894 / US 41	
Milwaukee	Milwaukee			WIS 241 (27th Street)	Northern terminus
1.000 mi = 1.609 km; 1.000 km = 0.621 mi
