= Wisconsin Highway 41 =

State Trunk Highway 41

Route information
- Maintained by WisDOT
- Existed: 1918–1926

Location
- Country: United States
- State: Wisconsin

Highway system
- Wisconsin State Trunk Highway System; Interstate; US; State; Scenic; Rustic
← US 41	→ WIS 42

State Trunk Highway 41 (often called Highway 41, STH-41 or WIS 41) was a number assigned to a state highway in the U.S. state of Wisconsin from 1917 to 1926, along the following present-day corridors in 1926:

- U.S. Highway 18 from Madison to Milwaukee
- U.S. Highway 14 from La Crosse, Wisconsin to Madison. - initially renumbered as Highway 11 until 1933.
- For the highway in Wisconsin numbered 41 since 1926, see U.S. Highway 41.
