= U.S. Route 41 in Wisconsin =

Section of U.S. Highway in Wisconsin

U.S. Highway 41
- World War II Veterans Memorial Highway
- US 41 highlighted in red

Route information
- Maintained by WisDOT
- Length: 225 mi (362 km)
- Existed: 1926–present
- Tourist routes: Lake Michigan Circle Tour

Major junctions
- South end: I-41 / I-94 / US 41 near Pleasant Prairie
- I-43 / I-94 / I-894 in Milwaukee; I-43 / US 45 in Greenfield; I-94 / I-894 in Milwaukee; US 151 in Fond du Lac; WIS 23 in Fond du Lac; US 45 in Oshkosh; US 10 in Fox Crossing; US 141 in Green Bay; I-43 in Howard; US 141 in Abrams
- North end: US 41 at Marinette

Location
- Country: United States
- State: Wisconsin
- Counties: Kenosha, Racine, Milwaukee, Waukesha, Washington, Dodge, Fond du Lac, Winnebago, Outagamie, Brown, Oconto, Marinette

Highway system
- United States Numbered Highway System; List; Special; Divided; Wisconsin State Trunk Highway System; Interstate; US; State; Scenic; Rustic
← I-41	→ WIS 41

U.S. Highway 41 (US 41) is a north–south highway United States Numbered Highway in eastern Wisconsin. It runs from Pleasant Prairie on the Illinois border north to Marinette on the Michigan border. Most of the route is concurrent with Interstate 41 in the state, with the exception of the portion between Howard, a suburb of Green Bay, and Marinette.

== Route description ==
US 41 is a freeway for nearly 85 percent of its route through Wisconsin, with the exceptions being a 29-mile (47 km) expressway section from the US 141 interchange in Oconto County to Marinette and a five-mile (8.0 km) surface arterial section within Marinette. The highway runs concurrently with I-94 from Milwaukee to the Illinois border and concurrently with I-41 from Howard to the Illinois border.

US 41 runs northwest from Milwaukee and passes Fond du Lac, Oshkosh, and Appleton before heading to Green Bay. The route is a major access point for the Milwaukee County Zoo, the EAA AirVenture Oshkosh air show in Oshkosh, the Fox River Mall and Fox Cities Stadium, and for Lambeau Field, the home of the Green Bay Packers NFL football team.

After leaving Green Bay, US 41 continues north to Abrams co-signed with US 141, and then it turns east off the co-signed route toward Marinette and into Michigan.

== History ==
The first alignment of US 41 in Wisconsin, which extended south from Marinette to the Illinois state line, was defined generally by two state trunk highways in existence in 1926: WIS 15 from Marinette to Milwaukee, and WIS 57 from Milwaukee to the Illinois state line. Signs for the newly established highway were to be placed in spring of 1927. A meeting of the Wisconsin Highway Commission in 1926 decided that no new U.S. Highway number would overlap with an existing state route number; therefore, WIS 41 was retired and renumbered when US 41 came into existence.

In Milwaukee the original routing of US 41 used Lisbon Avenue east to North 27th Street, then south along that road to the Illinois state line. After the Stadium Freeway was built in the 1960s, US 41 followed that road from Lisbon Avenue south across I-94 to National Avenue and then east to 27th Street, which is known as Layton Boulevard between National Avenue and Lincoln Avenue. WisDOT rerouted US 41 along I-94 from the Stadium Interchange to the Illinois state line, removed Layton Boulevard north of Forest Home Avenue from the state highway system and gave Layton Boulevard and 27th Street south of Forest Home Avenue the designation of WIS 241 in a compromise to avoid expansion of the original route. The old US 41 freeway section south of I-94 to National Avenue (which was realigned to accommodate the construction of American Family Field) was designated WIS 341 but is unsigned. Within Milwaukee city limits the road is known as Brewers Boulevard, while it is still signed Miller Park Way in West Milwaukee despite the stadium's new naming rights, because of that community's aversion to forcing businesses along its main commercial corridor to incur costs for an address change.

By 1955, US 41 was relocated from the corridor of today's WIS 175 and its successors to a nearby expressway in Winnebago, Fond du Lac, Dodge, Washington, Waukesha, and Milwaukee Counties.

In Green Bay, the road was rerouted in 1953 to make a curve to the right west of De Pere, going onto Ashland Avenue to the Green Bay city limits. It then turned left onto Highland Avenue (after 1968, Lombardi Avenue), going past Lambeau Field and curving right onto Military Avenue. It then turned left at Velp Avenue. US 41 then followed present day Velp Avenue north to Suamico where it merged with what is now the US 41 freeway. Until 1968 this was the outer highway for Green Bay; the area now is urbanized. The 1953–1968 Green Bay bypass was once again bypassed, sequentially, with the present US 41 freeway beginning at Velp, southerly to Lombardi in 1968; Velp north to Suamico in 1971; then from Lombardi south to De Pere in 1974.

Appleton also saw US 41 realignments over the course of time, beginning with the 1937 two-lane bypass (along the present freeway route) from Neenah northerly to a T-intersection with US 10 (today's Wisconsin Avenue, WIS 96). There, US 41 turned east with US 10, back to its original route at the intersection of US 10 (Wisconsin Avenue) and Richmond Street north of downtown Appleton, then north on Richmond to present day Northland Avenue. There it turned east on new alignment back to the original route northeast of Kaukauna. In 1940, US 41 was extended northerly from the T-intersection at US 10 for one mile (1.6 km), before making a large sweeping curve onto present day Northland Avenue to join back up with the previous bypass at Richmond Street. By 1962, the original Appleton bypass had been converted to four-lane divided highway from Oshkosh north to Northland Avenue, then north and east on new alignment bypassing the Northland Avenue bypass with the current freeway easterly to Kaukauna.

In the 1990s, a strategic effort was made along US 41 to convert the remaining expressway segments between Richfield and Abrams to freeway. The freeway conversion, which was completed by 2001, cleared the way for Interstate 41 to be designated along the corridor from the Illinois state line to Green Bay. Additionally, in the 2000s, the highway was widened to an expressway from Abrams to just west of Marinette, and included freeway bypasses around the cities of Oconto and Peshtigo. This 21 mile project, completed in 2009, cost $180 million and was included in WisPIRGs list of highway boondoggles due to the cost and overestimated traffic projections.

In the 2020s, the entire US 41 corridor was designated as an Alternative Fuel Corridor for electric vehicles.

== Exit list ==
County	Location	mi	km	Exit	Destinations	Notes
Kenosha	Pleasant Prairie	0.00	0.00		I-41 south / I-94 east / US 41 south – Chicago	Continuation into Illinois
Kenosha	Pleasant Prairie	2.04	3.28	347	WIS 165 / CTH-Q (Lakeview Parkway)	Exit numbers follow I-94
Kenosha	Pleasant Prairie	3.43	5.52	345	CTH-C	
Kenosha	Kenosha	5.07	8.16	344	WIS 50 – Kenosha, Lake Geneva	
Kenosha	Somers	6.59	10.61	342	WIS 158 – Kenosha	
Kenosha	Somers	8.35	13.44	340	WIS 142 / CTH-S – Burlington, Kenosha	
Kenosha	Town of Paris	10.07	16.21	339	CTH-E	
Racine–Kenosha county line	Mount Pleasant–Paris village/town line	12.08	19.44	337	WIS 195 – Mount Pleasant, Somers	
Racine	Mount Pleasant	13.95	22.45	335	WIS 11 – Burlington, Racine	
Racine	Town of Yorkville	15.96– 16.01	25.69– 25.77	333	WIS 20 – Waterford, Racine	
Racine	Caledonia	19.64	31.61	329	CTH-K – Racine	
Racine	Town of Raymond	21.67	34.87	327	CTH-G	
Racine	Town of Raymond	23.17	37.29	326	Seven Mile Road	
Racine	Caledonia	24.10	38.79	325	WIS 241 north (27th Street)	Permanently closed in favor of exit 324
Milwaukee	Oak Creek			324	Elm Road	
Milwaukee	Oak Creek	26.39	42.47	322	WIS 100 (Ryan Road)	
Milwaukee	Oak Creek	28.47	45.82	321	Drexel Avenue	
Milwaukee	Oak Creek	29.41	47.33	320	CTH-BB (Rawson Avenue)	
Milwaukee	Milwaukee	30.38	48.89	319	CTH-ZZ (College Avenue)	
Milwaukee	Milwaukee	31.08	50.02	318	WIS 119 – General Mitchell International Airport	
Milwaukee	Milwaukee	32.37	52.09	317	CTH-Y (Layton Avenue)	
Milwaukee	Milwaukee	32.53– 32.69	52.35– 52.61	316 10	I-43 north / I-94 west – Milwaukee I-894 west	Mitchell Interchange; northern end of I-94 overlap; eastern end of I-43 and I-894 overlaps
Milwaukee	Milwaukee	33.60	54.07	9	WIS 241 – South 27th Street	No access is allowed from I-94 west or to I-94 east; exit numbers follow I-894
Milwaukee	Greenfield	34.64	55.75	8	WIS 36 – Loomis Road	Signed as exits 8A (south) and 8B (north)
Milwaukee	Greenfield	35.64	57.36	7	South 60th Street	
Milwaukee	Greenfield	36.66	59.00	5B	CTH-U (South 76th Street)	Westbound exit and eastbound entrance
Milwaukee	Greenfield	36.66– 37.14	59.00– 59.77	5A-B	South 76th Street, South 84th Street	Eastbound exit and westbound entrance
Milwaukee	Greenfield	36.86	59.32	5A	WIS 24 west – Forest Home Avenue	Westbound exit and eastbound entrance
Milwaukee	Milwaukee	38.06	61.25	4	I-43 south / US 45 south – Beloit, Chicago	Hale Interchange; western end of I-43 overlap; southern end of the US 45 overlap
Milwaukee	Greenfield	39.32	63.28	3	CTH-T (Beloit Road)	
Milwaukee	Greenfield	39.93	64.26	2B	Oklahoma Avenue	Southbound exit and northbound entrance
Milwaukee	West Allis	40.67	65.45	2A	National Avenue	Southbound exit to westbound National Avenue only
Milwaukee	West Allis	40.93	65.87	1E	Lincoln Avenue	Southbound exit and northbound entrance
Milwaukee	West Allis	41.89	67.42	1D	WIS 59 – Greenfield Avenue	
Milwaukee	Milwaukee	42.61	68.57	1 38	I-94 – Madison, Downtown Milwaukee, Chicago I-894 east	Zoo Interchange; western end of I-894 overlap; signed as exits 1A (east) and 1B (west) northbound and exits 38A (west) and 38B (east) southbound
Milwaukee	Wauwatosa	43.36– 43.60	69.78– 70.17	39	US 18 (Bluemound Road) / Wisconsin Avenue	Northbound exit is not signed for Wisconsin Avenue; exit numbers follow US 45
Milwaukee	Wauwatosa	44.14– 44.56	71.04– 71.71	40	Watertown Plank Road, Swan Boulevard	Southbound exit not signed for Swan Boulevard
Milwaukee	Wauwatosa	44.94	72.32	42A	WIS 100 north (Mayfair Road) / North Avenue east	Southbound exit not signed for WIS 100
Milwaukee	Wauwatosa	45.54	73.29	42B	North Avenue west	
Milwaukee	Wauwatosa	46.59	74.98	43	Burleigh Street	
Milwaukee	Wauwatosa	47.59	76.59	44	WIS 190 (Capitol Drive)	Three-level diamond interchange; access roads for the adjacent plants are also part of the interchange
Milwaukee	Milwaukee	48.69	78.36	45	CTH-EE (Hampton Avenue)	
Milwaukee	Milwaukee	49.52	79.69	46	CTH-E south (Silver Spring Drive) / WIS 100	Southern end of WIS 100 overlap
Milwaukee	Milwaukee	51.05	82.16	47	WIS 175 (Appleton Avenue)	
Milwaukee	Milwaukee	51.85	83.44	47B	CTH-PP (Good Hope Road)	Exit numbers follow US 41
Milwaukee	Milwaukee	52.15– 52.94	83.93– 85.20	48	WIS 145	
Waukesha	Menomonee Falls	54.64– 54.77	87.93– 88.14	50	WIS 74 west / WIS 100 east (Main Street)	Northern end of WIS 100 overlap; signed as exits 50A (east) and 50B (west)
Waukesha	Menomonee Falls	55.45	89.24	51	Pilgrim Road	Signed as exits 51A (north) and 51B (south)
Washington	Germantown	56.68	91.22	52	CTH-Q (County Line Road)	
Washington	Germantown	58.63	94.36	54	WIS 167 east (Mequon Road) / CTH-Y (Lannon Road)	Southern end of WIS 167 overlap
Washington	Germantown	61.64	99.20	57	WIS 167 west (Holy Hill Road)	Northern end of WIS 167 overlap
Washington	Richfield	63.27	101.82	59	US 45 north – West Bend	Northern end of US 45 overlap; northbound exit and southbound entrance
Washington	Richfield	64.37	103.59	60	CTH-FD to WIS 145	Signage reads WIS 145; ramp signage reads CTH-FD TO WIS 145
Washington	Slinger	68.17	109.71	64	WIS 60 (Commerce Boulevard) – Jackson, Slinger, Hartford	Signed as exits 64A (east, Jackson) and 64B (west, Slinger, Hartford) northbound
Washington	Town of Polk	70.45	113.38	66	WIS 144 – West Bend, Slinger	
Washington	Town of Hartford	72.12	116.07	68	CTH-K	
Washington	Town of Addison	76.37	122.91	72	WIS 33 / CTH-W – West Bend, Allenton	
Washington	Town of Wayne	79.59	128.09	76	CTH-D	
Dodge	Town of Theresa	85.22	137.15	81	WIS 28 – Mayville, Kewaskum	
Dodge	Lomira	89.24	143.62	85	WIS 67 – Lomira, Campbellsport	
Dodge	Town of Lomira	91.29	146.92	87	WIS 49 / CTH-KK – Brownsville, Waupun	
Fond du Lac	Town of Byron	96.10	154.66	92	CTH-B – Oakfield, Eden	
Fond du Lac	Fond du Lac	99.71– 99.72	160.47– 160.48	95	US 45 south / US 151 – Madison, Manitowoc	Southern end of US 45 overlap
Fond du Lac	Fond du Lac	101.01	162.56	97	CTH-VVV (Hickory Street)	
Fond du Lac	Fond du Lac	101.84	163.90	98	CTH-D (Military Road)	Former US 151
Fond du Lac	Fond du Lac	103.74	166.95	99	US 45 north / WIS 23 (Johnson Street)	Northern end of US 45 overlap
Fond du Lac	North Fond du Lac	104.24	167.76	101	CTH-OO (Winnebago Street)	
Winnebago	Town of Eldorado	110.27	177.46	106	CTH-N – Van Dyne	
Winnebago	Town of Nekimi	117.47	189.05	113	WIS 26 / CTH-N – Rosendale, Waupun	
Winnebago	Oshkosh	120.22	193.48	116	WIS 44 / WIS 91 (South Park Avenue, Ripon Road)	
Winnebago	Oshkosh	121.64	195.76	117	9th Avenue	
Winnebago	Oshkosh	123.14	198.17	119	WIS 21 (Omro Road, Oshkosh Avenue)	
Winnebago	Oshkosh	125.05	201.25	120	US 45 (Algoma Boulevard) to US 10 west	To US 10 west not signed southbound
Winnebago	Oshkosh	128.10	206.16	124	WIS 76 (Jackson Street)	
Winnebago	Neenah	133.30	214.53	129	Bell Street, Breezewood Lane	
Winnebago	Neenah	134.67	216.73	131	WIS 114 / CTH-JJ (Winneconne Avenue)	
Winnebago	Neenah	135.61	218.24	132	Main Street, Oak Ridge Road	No entrance ramps
Winnebago	Fox Crossing	136.35	219.43	133	CTH-II (Winchester Road)	
Winnebago	Fox Crossing	137.81	221.78	134	US 10 east / WIS 441 north	
Winnebago	Fox Crossing	137.86	221.86	134	US 10 west	
Winnebago	Fox Crossing	139.62	224.70	136	CTH-BB (Prospect Avenue)	
Outagamie	Town of Grand Chute	140.88	226.72	137	WIS 125 (College Avenue) / CTH-CA – Appleton International Airport, Downtown	
Outagamie	Town of Grand Chute	141.65	227.96	138	WIS 96 (Wisconsin Avenue)	
Outagamie	Town of Grand Chute	142.71	229.67	139	WIS 15 / CTH-OO (Northland Avenue) to CTH-A	To CTH-A not signed southbound
Outagamie	Town of Grand Chute	145.67	234.43	142	WIS 47 (Richmond Street)	
Outagamie	Appleton	147.67	237.65	144	CTH-E (Ballard Road)	
Outagamie	Appleton	148.59– 148.61	239.13– 239.16	145	WIS 441 south	
Outagamie	Little Chute	151.10	243.17	146	CTH-N – Little Chute	
Outagamie	Kaukauna	152.78	245.88	148	WIS 55 – Seymour, Kaukauna	
Outagamie	Kaukauna	153.99	247.82	150	CTH-J – Kaukauna	
Outagamie	Town of Kaukauna	158.25	254.68	154	CTH-U – Wrightstown	
Brown	Town of Lawrence	161.21	259.44	157	CTH-S – Freedom	
Brown	Town of Lawrence	164	264	160	CTH-EB (Packerland Drive) / CTH-GV (Generations Drive) – De Pere	
Brown	Town of Lawrence	165.87	266.94	161	CTH-F (Scheuring Road)	
Brown	Ashwaubenon	167.12	268.95	163A	CTH-G (Main Avenue)	Signed as exit 163 southbound
Brown	Ashwaubenon	167.40	269.40	163B	WIS 32 north (Ashland Avenue) – Green Bay	Northbound exit and southbound entrance
Brown	Ashwaubenon	168.39	271.00	164A	CTH-AAA (Oneida Street, Waube Lane)	
Brown	Ashwaubenon	169.36– 169.46	272.56– 272.72	164B	WIS 172 to I-43 – A. Straubel Airport	
Brown	Ashwaubenon	171.14	275.42	167	CTH-VK (Lombardi Avenue, Hazelwood Lane)	
Brown	Green Bay	172.18	277.10	168A	WIS 32 south / WIS 54 (Mason Street)	Southern end of WIS 32 overlap
Brown	Howard	173.17	278.69	168B-C	WIS 29 (Shawano Avenue) / WIS 32 north / Dousman Street	Northern end of WIS 32 overlap
Brown	Howard	174.75	281.23	170A	US 141 south / CTH-HS (Velp Avenue)	Southern end of US 141 overlap; former exit 170
Brown	Howard	175.16– 175.43	281.89– 282.33	170B	I-43 south / LMCT – Milwaukee	Northern terminus of I-41 and I-43; northern end of I-41 overlap; former exit 171
Brown	Town of Suamico			173	CTH-M (Lineville Road)	
Brown	Town of Suamico			176	CTH-B (Sunset Beach Road) – Suamico	
Oconto	Town of Little Suamico			179	Brown Road	
Oconto	Town of Little Suamico			182	CTH-S	
Oconto	Town of Abrams			185	CTH-D (Sampson Road) to CTH-EE – Abrams	
Oconto	Town of Abrams			187	US 141 north – Crivitz, Iron Mountain	Northern end of US 141 overlap
Oconto	Northern end of freeway					
Oconto	Town of Pensaukee				CTH-J – Brookside, Little Suamico	
Oconto	Town of Pensaukee				CTH-SS – Pensaukee	
Oconto	Southern end of freeway					
Oconto				197	Bus. US 41 north – Oconto	Northbound exit and southbound entrance
Oconto	Oconto			198	WIS 22 / CTH-Y – Oconto, Oconto Falls, Gillett	
Oconto				200	Bus. US 41 south to CTH-S – Oconto	Southbound exit and northbound entrance
Oconto	Northern end of freeway					
Oconto					CTH-A east	Southern end of CTH-A overlap
Oconto					CTH-A west – Lena	Northern end of CTH-A overlap
Marinette	County Line				CTH-W – County Line	
Marinette	Grover				CTH-M – Coleman	
Marinette	Southern end of freeway					
Marinette				212	Bus. US 41 north / CTH-Y – Peshtigo	
Marinette				216	Bus. US 41 south – Peshtigo	
Marinette	Northern end of freeway					
Marinette	Marinette				CTH-T (Roosevelt Road) to WIS 180	
Marinette	Marinette				WIS 64 west (Hall Avenue) to WIS 180	
Menominee River				Wisconsin–Michigan state line		
Menominee River					US 41 north / LMCT – Menominee, Escanaba	Continuation into Michigan
1.000 mi = 1.609 km; 1.000 km = 0.621 mi: Closed/former; Concurrency terminus; Incomplete access

== See also ==
U.S. Route 41
Previous state: Illinois	Wisconsin	Next state: Michigan
