= Wisconsin Highway 24 =

State highway in Wisconsin

State Trunk Highway 24
- WIS 24 highlighted in red

Route information
- Maintained by WisDOT
- Length: 7.88 mi (12.68 km)

Major junctions
- West end: CTH-L at Hales Corners border
- US 45 / WIS 100 in Hales Corners; I-41 / I-43 / I-894 / US 41 in Greenfield
- East end: WIS 241 in Milwaukee

Location
- Country: United States
- State: Wisconsin
- Counties: Milwaukee

Highway system
- Wisconsin State Trunk Highway System; Interstate; US; State; Scenic; Rustic
← WIS 23	→ WIS 25

State Trunk Highway 24 (often called Highway 24, STH-24 or WIS 24) is a 7.88-mile (12.68 km) state highway in southwestern Milwaukee County, Wisconsin, in the United States. The route is a multi-lane urban arterial that serves the suburbs of West Allis, Greenfield and Hales Corners, and follows Janesville Road and West Forest Home Avenue.

== Route description ==
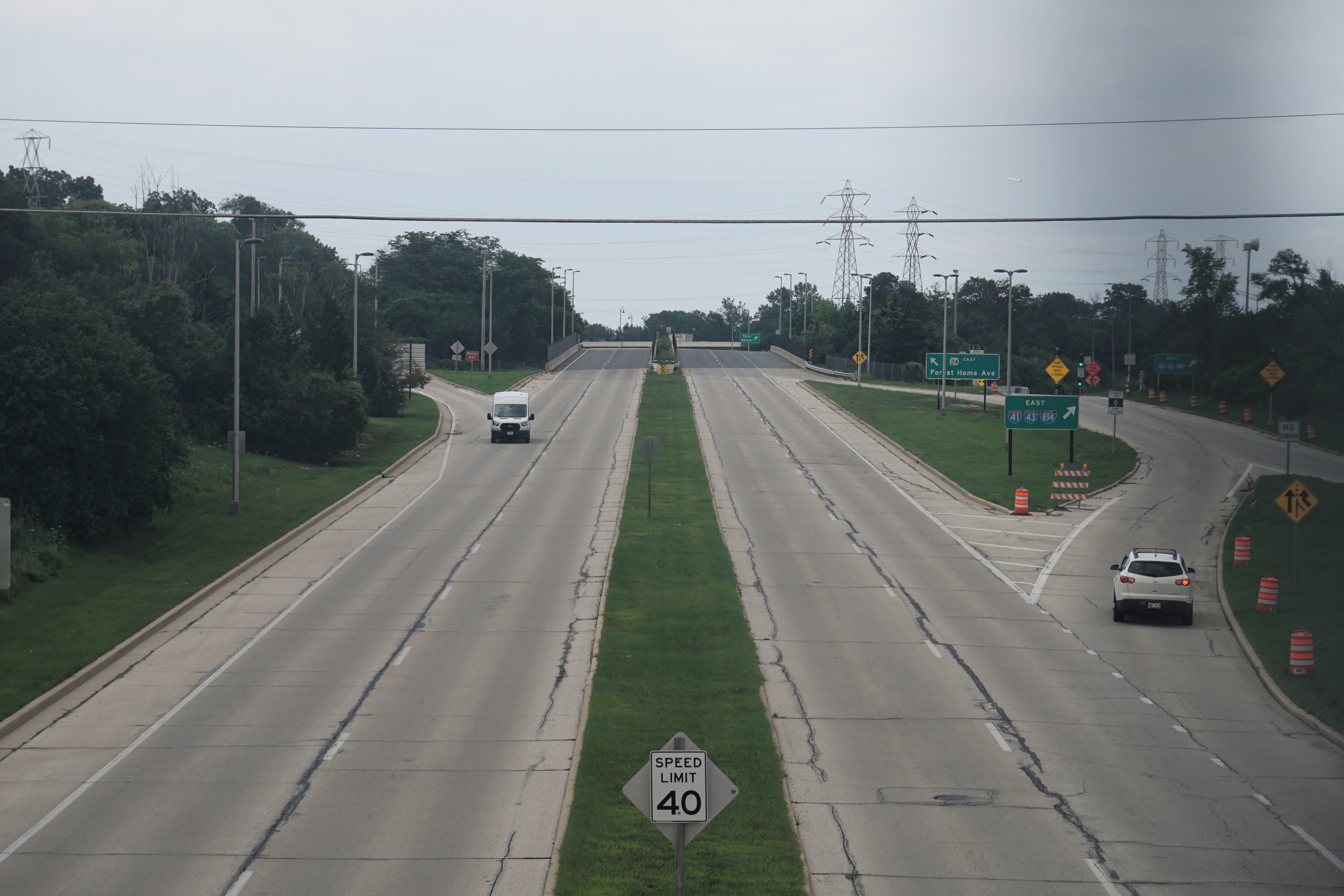
WIS 24, as West Forest Home Avenue, in Greenfield

The highway's western terminus is at the Waukesha County line in Hales Corners. West of the county line the route is signed as County Trunk Highway L (CTH-L). The highway crosses 108th street, which carries U.S. Highway 45/Wisconsin Highway 100 (US 45/WIS 100), one mile (1.6 km) east of the county line. The section of WIS 24 between the county line and 108th Street is Janesville Road. The remainder of the highway follows West Forest Home Avenue. East of US 45/WIS 100, the highway turns northeasterly, junctioning with Interstate 43/Interstate 894 (I-43/I-894) in Greenfield. Further northeast the route terminates at South 27th Street, which carries WIS 241.

== History ==
The original routing of WIS 24 in 1918 began in Washburn County began east of Spooner at then WIS 11 (the junction of CTH-M on WIS 70). The route junctioned with the former Wisconsin Highway 40 (now Wisconsin Highway 27) and turned northward, following what is now U.S. Route 63 (US 63) from Hayward to south of Ashland The highway followed what is now WIS 112 and terminated at WIS 13 south of Ashland. The early 1920s saw WIS 24 extended southwestward along the present day route of US 63 to Turtle Lake then to New Richmond along WIS 64 and southwest to Hudson. When US 63 was opened WIS 24 was removed from the books.

WIS 24 used to continue southwest through Waukesha, Racine and Walworth Counties to Wisconsin Highway 20 in East Troy, but was turned over to local control and redesignated as CTH-L in the late 1980s.

== Major intersections ==
The entire route is in Milwaukee County.

Location	mi	km	Destinations	Notes
New Berlin–Hales Corners line	0.00	0.00	CTH-L west (Janesville Road) – Muskego	Western terminus; road continues westerly beyond western terminus into Waukesha County
Hales Corners	1.17	1.88	US 45 / WIS 100 (South 108th Street)	
Hales Corners	2.65	4.26	CTH-N (South 92nd Street)	
Greenfield	3.73	6.00	I-41 / I-43 / I-894 (Airport Freeway)	
Greenfield	3.93	6.32	CTH-U (South 76th Street)	
Milwaukee	6.58	10.59	CTH-NN (West Oklahoma Avenue)	
Milwaukee	7.88	12.68	WIS 241 (South Layton Avenue/South 27th Avenue)	Eastern terminus; road continues northeast as West Forest Home Avenue
1.000 mi = 1.609 km; 1.000 km = 0.621 mi
