= Franklin, Milwaukee County, Wisconsin =

City in Wisconsin, United States

Franklin, Wisconsin
- City
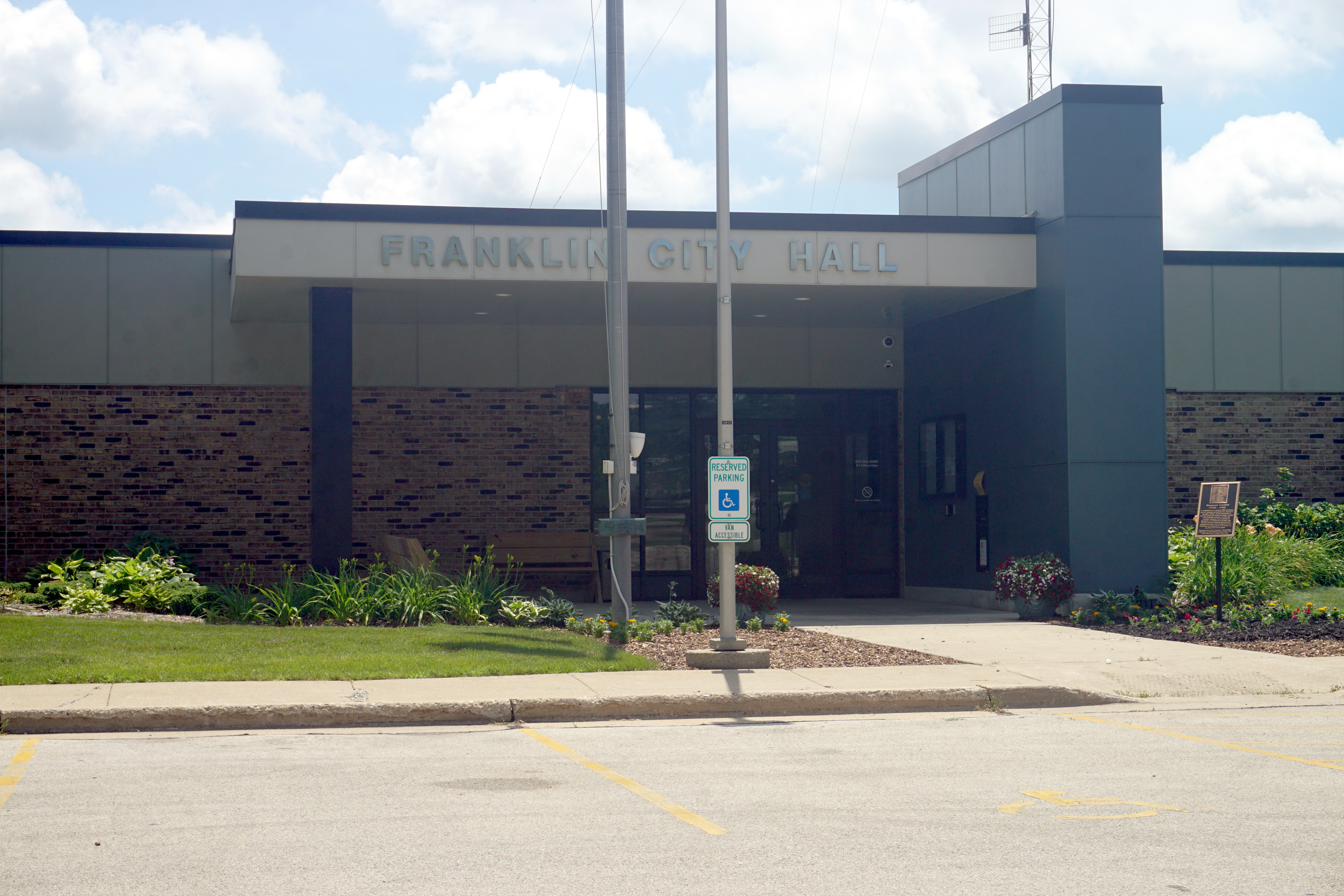
- Franklin City Hall
- Interactive map of Franklin, Wisconsin
- Location within Wisconsin Location within the United States
- Coordinates: 42°53′19″N 88°02′18″W
- County: Milwaukee
- Founded: 1841
- Incorporated: 1956

Government
  - Mayor: John Nelson

Area
  - Total: 34.68 sq mi (89.82 km^{2})
  - Land: 34.58 sq mi (89.55 km^{2})
  - Water: 0.10 sq mi (0.27 km^{2})
- Elevation: 791 ft (241 m)

Population (2020)
  - Total: 36,816
  - Estimate (2021): 36,624
  - Density: 1,035.8/sq mi (399.91/km^{2})
- Time zone: UTC−6 (Central)
  - Summer (DST): UTC−5 (Central)
- ZIP Code: 53113, 53132
- Area code: 414
- FIPS code: 55-27300
- GNIS feature ID: 1583234
- Website: www.franklinwi.gov

Franklin is a city in Milwaukee County, Wisconsin, United States. The population was 36,816 at the 2020 census. A suburb of Milwaukee, it is part of the Milwaukee metropolitan area.

== History ==
On December 20, 1839, the south portion of the Town of Kinnikinick was split off to form the town of Franklin. The town consisted of a 36-square-mile area that was originally covered with heavy timber, which was mostly hardwoods such as hickory, walnut, and butternut. Most of the town's drainage was delivered by the Root River and there was an abundance of wildlife including bears, deer, and wolves. As of the 1840 census, the population of the Town of Franklin was 248. The name "Franklin" was given in homage to Benjamin Franklin.

By the 1950s, Franklin was known as a "City of Homes" for its growing residential areas, which served as a suburb of the city of Milwaukee. In 1956, town officials were concerned by the possibility that the city of Milwaukee might attempt to annex portions of Franklin. In response, the town was incorporated as a fourth-class city on August 15, 1956.

== Geography ==
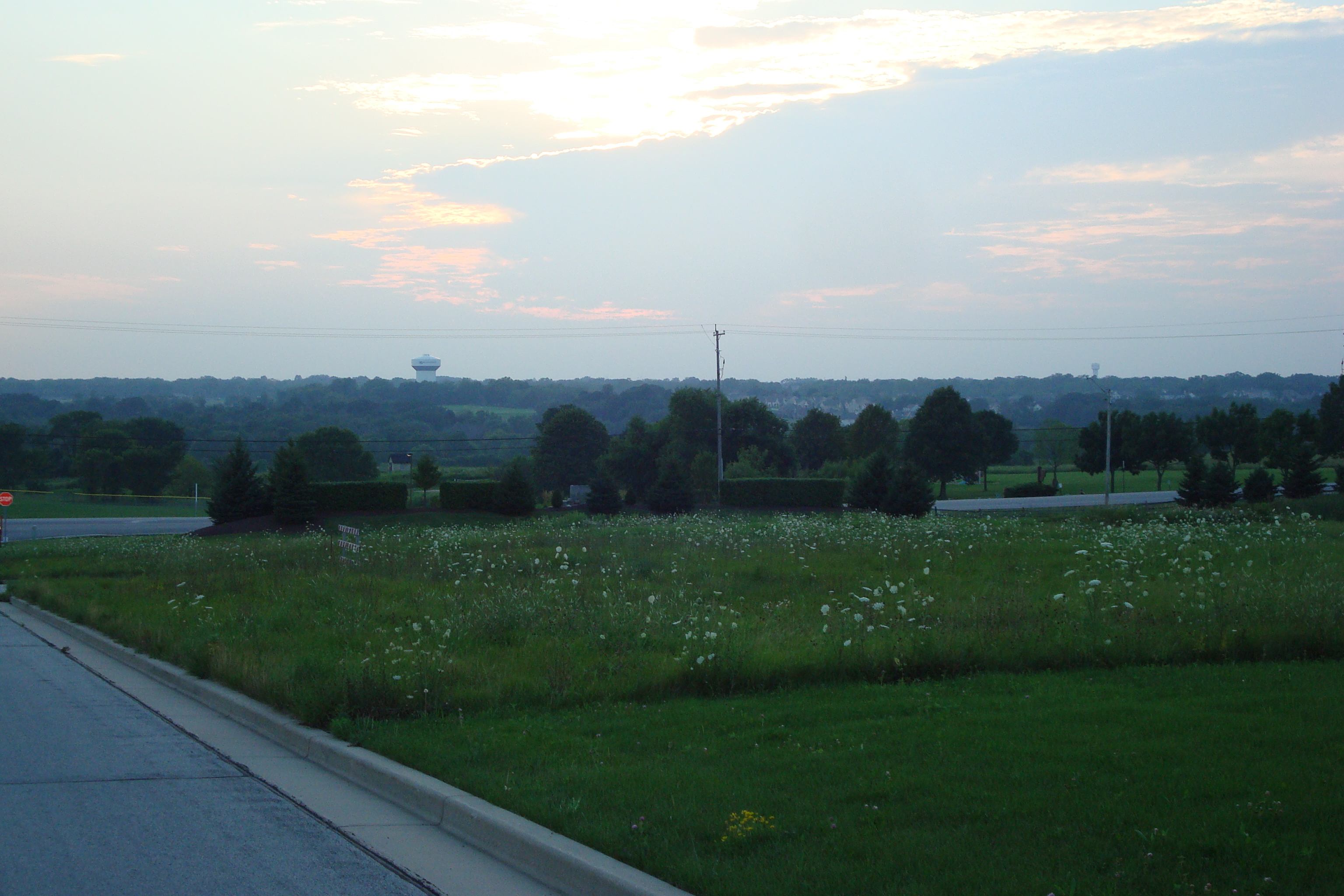
Root River Valley

Franklin is located at 42°53′19″N 88°02′18″W (42.888611°, -88.038333°). It is bounded by the city of Oak Creek to the east, the villages of Greendale and Hales Corners and the city of Greenfield to the north, the county of Racine to the south, and the county of Waukesha to the west.

According to the United States Census Bureau, the city has a total area of 34.69 square miles (89.85 km^{2}), of which 34.58 square miles (89.56 km^{2}) is land and 0.11 square miles (0.28 km^{2}) is water.

The Root River runs south through Franklin, bisecting the city.

=== Climate ===
Franklin

Climate chart (precipitation, max. and min. temperature)
J	F	M	A	M	J	J	A	S	O	N	D
97 −6 −12	101 −3 −11	68 6 −6	165 17 2	111 20 5	138 29 12	100 28 16	95 26 13	67 23 11	92 15 6	64 7 −2	78 −3 −8
- █ Average max. and min. temperatures in °C
- █ Precipitation totals in mm
Imperial conversion
J	F	M	A	M	J	J	A	S	O	N	D
3.8 21 10	4 27 12	2.7 43 21	6.5 63 36	4.4 68 41	5.4 84 54	3.9 82 61	3.7 79 55	2.6 73 52	3.6 59 43	2.5 45 28	3.1 27 18
- █ Average max. and min. temperatures in °F
- █ Precipitation totals in inches

== Demographics ==
Historical population
Census	Pop.	Note	%±
1960	10,006		—
1970	12,247		22.4%
1980	16,871		37.8%
1990	21,855		29.5%
2000	29,494		35.0%
2010	35,451		20.2%
2020	36,816		3.9%
2021 (est.)	36,624		−0.5%
U.S. Decennial Census

=== 2010 census ===
As of the census of 2010, there were 35,451 people, 13,642 households, and 9,351 families living in the city. The population density was 1,025.2 inhabitants per square mile (395.8/km^{2}). There were 14,356 housing units at an average density of 415.2 units per square mile (160.3 units/km^{2}). The racial makeup of the city was 87.1% White, 4.9% African American, 0.4% Native American, 5.4% Asian, 0.8% from other races, and 1.5% from two or more races. Hispanic or Latino of any race were 4.5% of the population. The House of Correction members are counted in this demographic.

There were 13,642 households, of which 30.5% had children under the age of 18 living with them, 58.3% were married couples living together, 6.8% had a female householder with no husband present, 3.5% had a male householder with no wife present, and 31.5% were non-families. 26.4% of all households were made up of individuals, and 10.7% had someone living alone who was 65 years of age or older. The average household size was 2.45 and the average family size was 2.99.

The median age in the city was 41.5 years. 21.6% of residents were under the age of 18; 7.7% were between the ages of 18 and 24; 25.9% were from 25 to 44; 31.4% were from 45 to 64; and 13.4% were 65 years of age or older. The gender makeup of the city was 51.1% male and 48.9% female.

=== 2000 census ===
As of the census of 2000, there were 29,494 people, 10,602 households, and 7,697 families living in the city. The population density was 851.8 people per square mile (328.9 people/km^{2}). There were 10,936 housing units at an average density of 315.8 units per square mile (121.9 units/km^{2}). The racial makeup of the city was 98.78% White, 0.15% African American, 0.036% Native American, 2.10% Asian, 0.03% Pacific Islander, 0.67% from other races, and 0.91% from two or more races. Hispanic or Latino of any race were 2.64% of the population.

There were 10,602 households, out of which 33.8% had children under the age of 18 living with them, 63.2% were married couples living together, 6.6% had a female householder with no husband present, and 27.4% were non-families. 22.5% of all households were made up of individuals, and 6.9% had someone living alone who was 65 years of age or older. The average household size was 2.58, and the average family size was 3.06.

In the city, the population was spread out, with 23.4% under the age of 18, 8.4% from 18 to 24, 32.7% from 25 to 44, 25.6% from 45 to 64, and 9.9% who were 65 years of age or older. The median age was 38 years. For every 100 females, there were 109.2 males. For every 100 females age 18 and over, there were 110.0 males.

The median income for a household in the city was US$75,315, and the median income for a family was $95,532. Males had a median income of $61,827 versus $54,737 for females. The per capita income for the city was $33,474. About 0.4% of families and 0.7% of the population were below the poverty line, including 2.7% of those under age 18 and 3.9% of those age 65 or over.

== Economy ==
According to Franklin's 2012 Comprehensive Annual Financial Report, the top employers in the city were:

#	Employer	# of Employees
1	Northwestern Mutual	2,550
2	Wheaton Franciscan Healthcare	712
3	Franklin Public School District	543
4	Krones	450
5	GA Precision	364
6	Milwaukee County Corrections South	360
7	Walmart	357
8	Carlisle Interconnect Technologies	270
9	Central Aquatics	261
10	Strauss Brands	250

== Government and politics ==
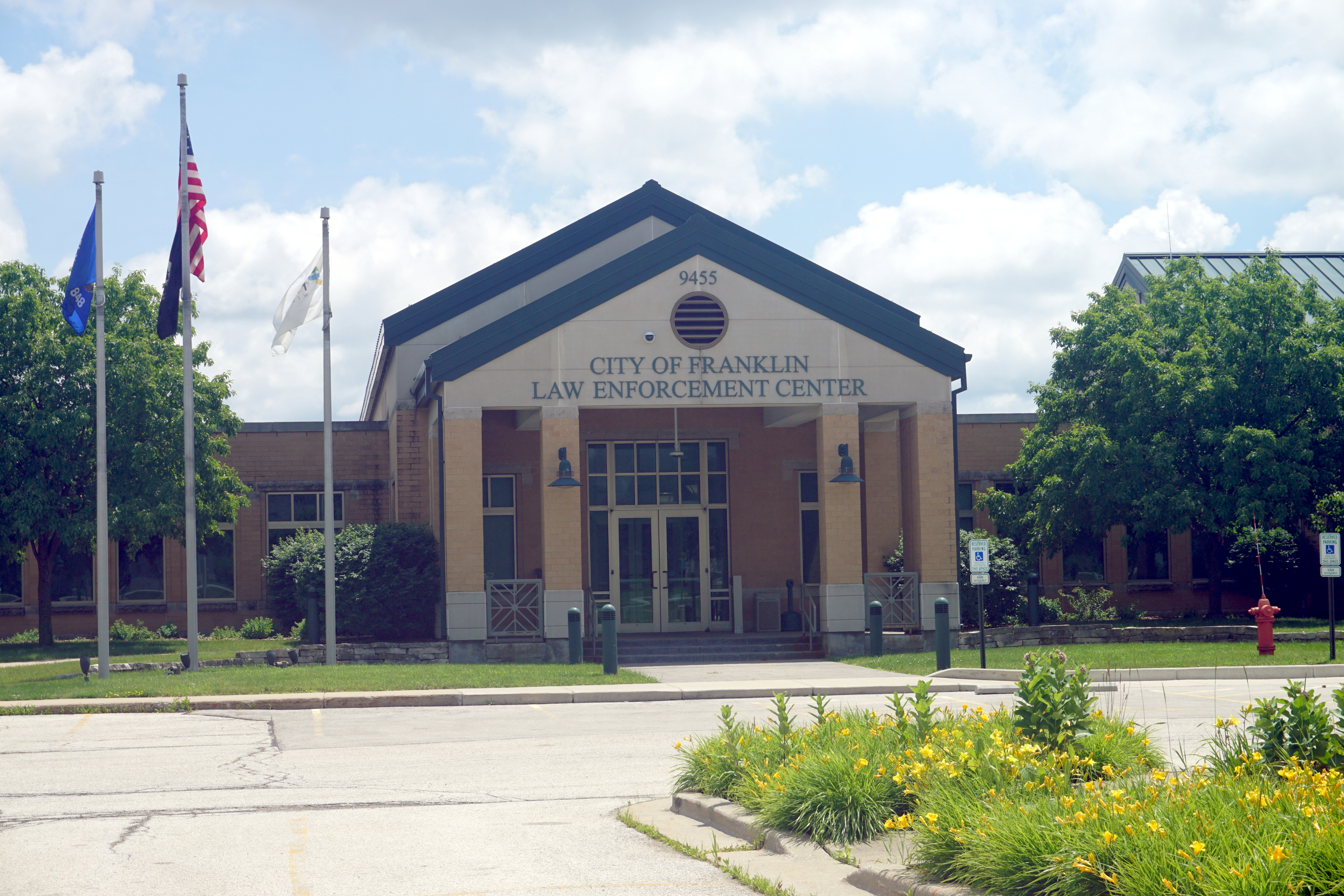
City of Franklin Law Enforcement Center

Franklin government consists of a mayor (executive branch), a common council (legislative branch), and a municipal judge (judicial branch). The Common Council's primary purpose is the passage of laws, ordinances and policies, establishment of pay ranges for city employees and management of the city's financial affairs; its budget, its revenues, and the raising of funds for the operation of the city. The Common Council is composed of the mayor and six members representing the six aldermanic districts, serving three-year overlapping terms. One alderman is elected and serves as common council president.

The mayor of the city, elected for a three-year term of office, is the chief executive officer of the city. The mayor is responsible for ensuring that city ordinances and state laws are observed and enforced, and that city officers, boards and commissions properly discharge their duties. The mayor oversees the police and fire departments; nominates the appointment of certain city employees, board and commission members to the council; and is chairman of the Plan Commission and the Community Development Authority. The mayor presides at meetings of the Common Council, voting only in cases if tie votes. City ordinances designate eight cabinet officers, as well as other unclassified positions within city government, that are appointed by the mayor subject to the confirmation by a majority of all members of the common council. Mayor Steve Olson was re-elected in April, 2020 for a third three-year term. In April, 2023, Franklin Alderman John Nelson was elected mayor for his first three-year term as mayor.

Franklin is in Milwaukee County. It shares parts of the 9th, 11th and 17th Milwaukee County Supervisor districts, which are the only three districts that fall within the city. Most of Franklin lies in the 28th State Senate District and the 82nd State Assembly District, the remainder lies in the 7th State Senate District and the 21st State Assembly District. Franklin is represented in the United States Senate by Senators Ron Johnson (R) and Tammy Baldwin (D). The city falls within Wisconsin's 1st congressional district, which is represented by Bryan Steil (R).

Year	Election	Democratic			Republican			Others		Total	Plurality
Year	Election	Candidate	Votes	Pct.	Candidate	Votes	Pct.	Votes	Pct.	Total	Plurality
2024	U.S. President	Kamala Harris	10,154	43.97%	Donald Trump	12,191	52.79%	748	3.24%	23,093	2,037
2024	U.S. Senate	Tammy Baldwin	10,191	44.79%	Eric Hovde	12,058	53.00%	503	2.21%	22,752	1,867
2022	Governor	Tony Evers	8,387	46.64%	Tim Michels	9,453	52.57%	143	0.80%	17,983	1,066
2022	U.S. Senate	Mandela Barnes	7,976	44.47%	Ron Johnson	9,924	55.33%	37	0.21%	17,937	1,948
2020	U.S. President	Joe Biden	10,048	45.27%	Donald Trump	11,875	53.50%	275	1.24%	22,198	1,827
2018	Governor	Tony Evers	7,208	39.20%	Scott Walker	10,930	59.43%	252	1.37%	18,390	3,722
2018	U.S. Senator	Tammy Baldwin	8,459	46.30%	Leah Vukmir	9,796	53.62%	14	0.08%	18,269	1,337
2016	U.S. President	Hillary Clinton	8,048	40.71%	Donald Trump	10,569	53.47%	1,151	5.82%	19,768	2,521
2016	U.S. Senator	Russ Feingold	7,394	37.53%	Ron Johnson	11,913	60.48%	392	1.99%	19,699	4,519
2014	Governor	Mary Burke	5,590	34.15%	Scott Walker	10,653	65.08%	125	0.76%	16,368	5,063
2012	U.S. President	Barack Obama	8,163	40.51%	Mitt Romney	11,849	58.80%	140	0.69%	20,152	3,686
2012	U.S. Senate	Tammy Baldwin	7,878	39.86%	Tommy Thompson	11,525	58.31%	363	1.84%	19,766	3,647
2012	Governor (recall)	Tom Barrett	5,834	34.79%	Scott Walker	10,884	64.91%	49	0.29%	16,767	5,050
2010	Governor	Tom Barrett	5,397	35.93%	Scott Walker	9,534	63.47%	91	0.61%	15,022	4,137
2010	U.S. Senate	Russ Feingold	5,365	35.64%	Ron Johnson	9,605	63.81%	82	0.54%	15,052	4,240

== Education ==
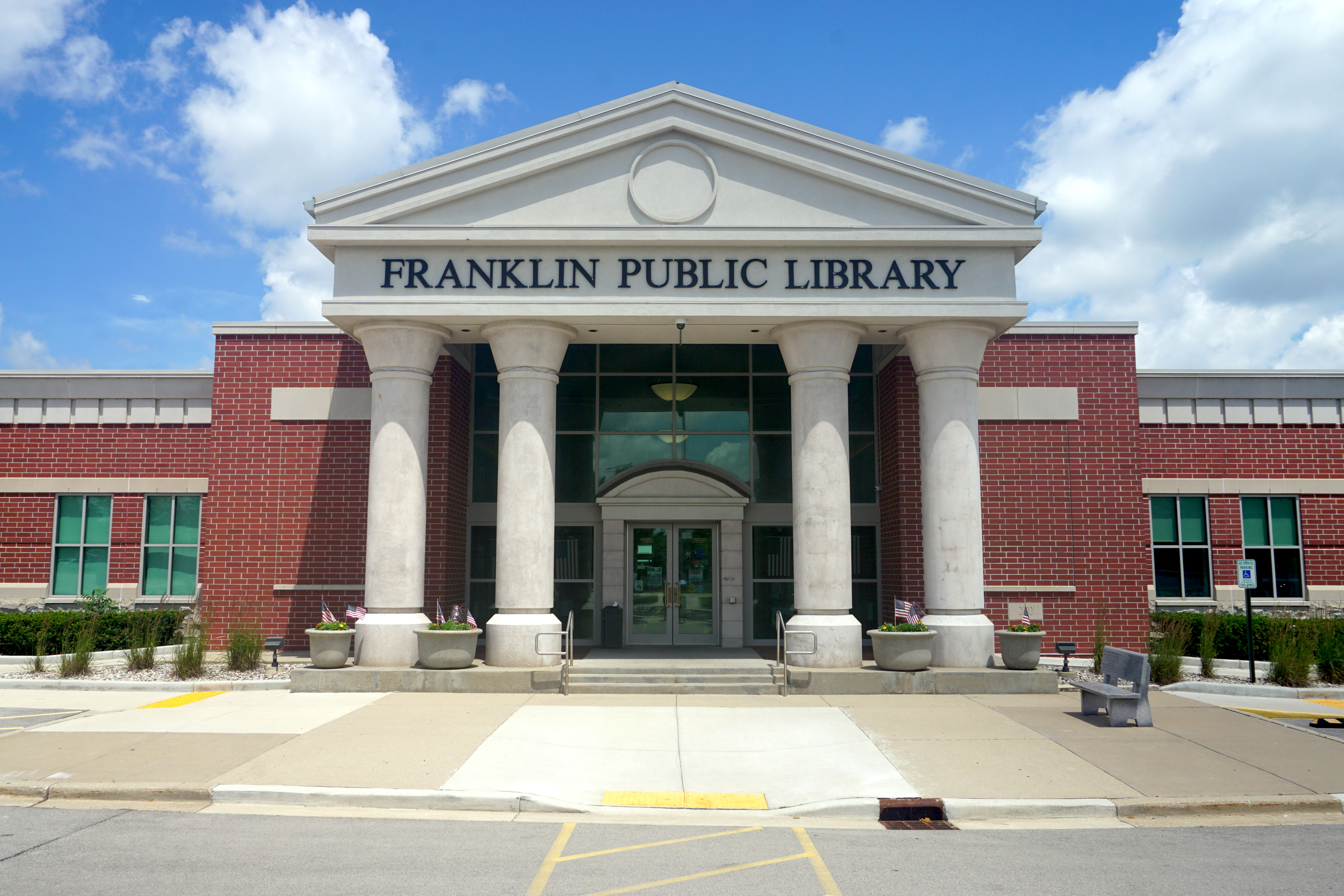
Franklin Public Library

The majority of Franklin primary and secondary students attend schools in the Franklin Public School District, which was formed in 1962 as a K–12 common school district. Franklin has five elementary schools, one middle school and one high school. The Franklin Recreation Department is also operated by the school district. The district is governed by an annual meeting of electors and a seven-member school board elected every three years with overlapping terms and election held every year in April. City government exercises no fiscal control over the school district.

The Oak Creek-Franklin School District serves residents of the far eastern side of Franklin, along 27th street. The district also serves all of the city of Oak Creek. The Whitnall School District, which serves primarily the neighboring village of Hales Corners and parts of the city of Greenfield, serves Franklin residents residing on the city's far northwest side.

Franklin's private schools include St. Pauls Lutheran K4–8, founded in 1865 by a group of German Lutherans, and Indian Community School of Milwaukee K4–8, serving Native American children and youth.

== Transportation ==
Franklin is four miles (6.4 km) from Milwaukee Mitchell International Airport and close to Interstate 94. Running through the city are U.S. Highway 45, and WIS 36, WIS 100, and WIS 241. The St. Martins Junction in Franklin served two interurban lines. One went south to Burlington. Another went west to East Troy.

== Environmental concerns ==
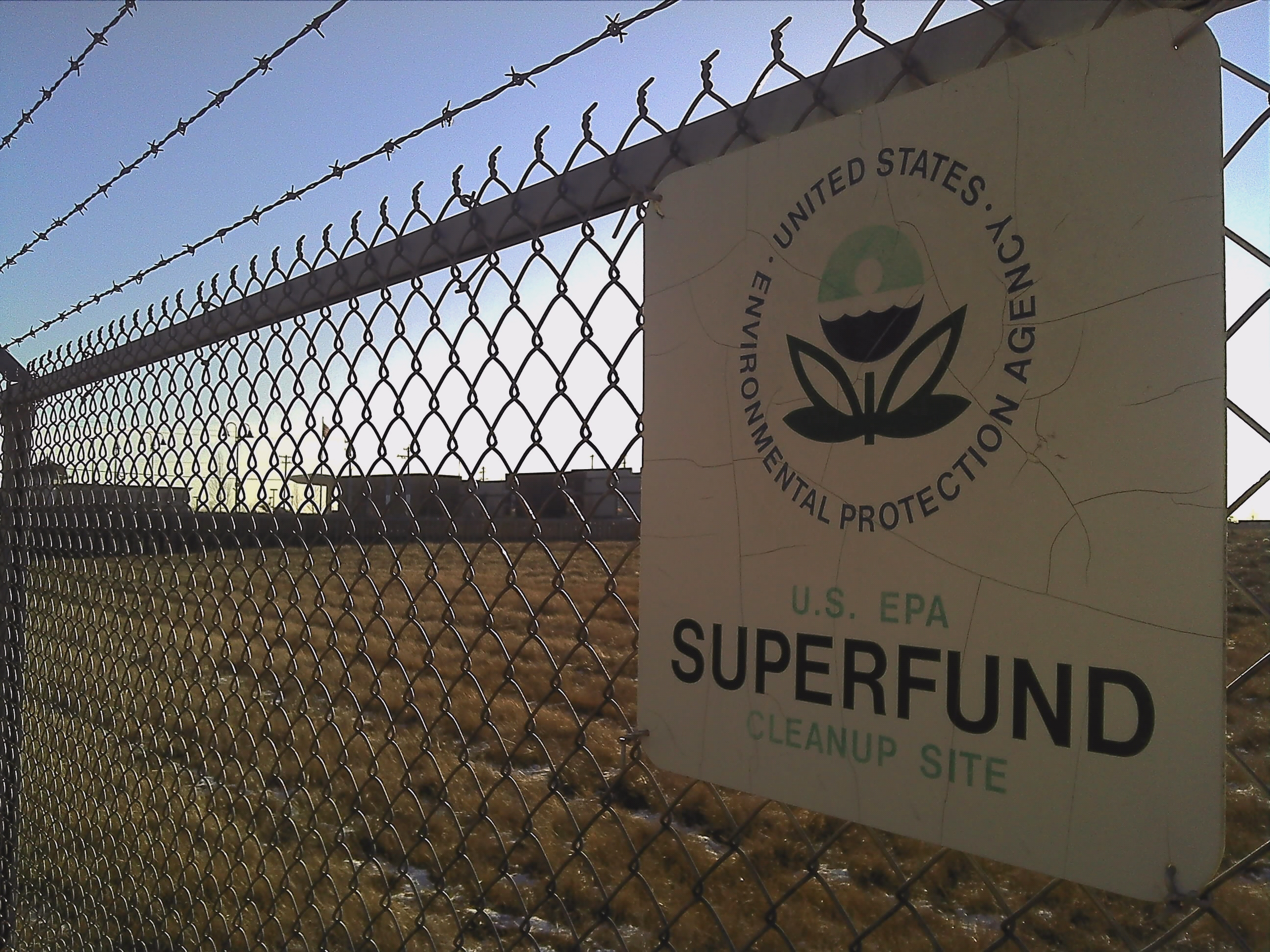
Fadrowski Drum Disposal EPA Superfund Site with Dental Associates facility in background

Franklin is home to one of the Environmental Protection Agency's Superfund sites. Referred to as the "Fadrowski Drum Disposal Site", or FDDS, the 40-acre (160,000 m^{2}) site located at 42°55′14″N 87°57′10″W 6865 South 27th Street was found to be contaminated with high amounts of lead and chromium. Trace amounts of arsenic and DDT were also found. The site also contains levels of mercury above Wisconsin enforcement standards. The site once included a human-made pond with elevated cyanide levels. The site was placed on the National Priorities List in 1986, with remedial action (RA) completed in 1994. The site was deleted from the National Priorities List in 2003. The site remedies included restricting access to the site, restricting use of land at the site, limited excavation of the waste (some drums), removal of hazardous soil, monitoring ground water, monitoring surface water, and installing a landfill cap. The site has been largely remediated via landfill and limited excavation, however waste material above health-based levels was left on site.

The site is currently under a monitoring status, with the U.S. Environmental Protection Agency reviewing the site every five years. The site is now encircled by development. It is bordered on the north by a Hobby Lobby, a tributary that flows into the Root River, and South 27th Street. The southern boundary of the site is lined with a Goodwill Industries retail store. Residential properties are just 1,000 feet (300 m) west of the site and 600 feet (180 m) to the south. A Walmart is just 600 feet (180 m) north of the site. The site itself is prohibited from ever being used for potable water, residential development, or any development that would disturb the landfill cap. As of March 2021, a portion of the site is being considered for development as a dog park.

== Notable people ==
- Eric Bugenhagen, Professional wrestler with World Wrestling Entertainment
- Peter Doyle, Wisconsin Secretary of State
- Michael Egan, state senator and representative
- Sam Mayer, racing driver
- Scott Mayer, racing driver
- Ted Musgrave, NASCAR driver
- Bill Prietzel, racing driver nicknamed the "Franklin Flyer"
- Janet Protasiewicz, Justice of the Wisconsin Supreme Court
- Jessie Rodriguez, advocate and politician
- Ken Skowronski, Wisconsin State Representative
