= Wisconsin Highway 190 =

State highway in Wisconsin, United States

State Trunk Highway 190
- Capitol Drive
- WIS 190 highlighted in red

Route information
- Maintained by WisDOT
- Length: 19.58 mi (31.51 km)
- Existed: 1947–present

Major junctions
- West end: WIS 16 in Pewaukee
- I-41 / US 41 / US 45 in Wauwatosa; I-43 / WIS 57 in Milwaukee
- East end: WIS 32 / LMCT in Shorewood

Location
- Country: United States
- State: Wisconsin
- Counties: Waukesha, Milwaukee

Highway system
- Wisconsin State Trunk Highway System; Interstate; US; State; Scenic; Rustic
← WIS 189	→ WIS 191

State Trunk Highway 190 (often called Highway 190, STH-190 or WIS 190) is a state highway in the U.S. state of Wisconsin. It runs east–west in southeast Wisconsin from Pewaukee to Shorewood.

== Route description ==
In Milwaukee, WIS 190 is known as Capitol Drive, one of the main streets of the city's north side. The road's name comes from older mapping methods that discerned the road would lead directly toward the Wisconsin State Capitol in Madison if built in a straight east-west line from Lake Michigan, though current day mapping actually places it two miles north of downtown Madison and the Capitol's center point.

The designation is carried all the way west to Pewaukee and its terminus just west of its interchange with WIS 16 in the Village of Pewaukee. WI 190 officially ends at the intersection with Simmons Avenue in Pewaukee, a block south of the post office. It begins again just west of Pewaukee initially under the name Lisbon Avenue and finally ends as West Capitol drive at the western end of Hartland. Capitol Drive is the main street for downtown Hartland.

Although much of the original road has been changed into new roads or gone completely, remnants of it are still visible under different names. This is especially true of roads adjacent to WIS 16 until its end as a freeway in Oconomowoc.

=== Harley-Davidson Plant ===
The Harley-Davidson Motorcycle middle-weight engine assembly plant and Product Development Center (PDC) are located at the intersection of WIS 190 and US Highway 45/Interstate 41 in Milwaukee. The entrance to the plant and to the PDC is accessible by off-ramp from the western section of Capitol Drive's interchange with US 45/I-41.

Due to the proximity of the I-41 freeway with the plant entrance, the interchange is a unique three-level diamond interchange with an access road connecting the plant to both highways.

== History ==
WIS 190 was designated in 1947 along a segment of the former US 16 east from Pewaukee. The routing assigned to WIS 190 has remained unchanged other than changes along Capitol Drive and the removal of a small portion through downtown Pewaukee to end the road at the WIS 16 freeway.

== Major intersections ==
County	Location	mi	km	Destinations	Notes
Waukesha	Village of Pewaukee	0.0	0.0	WIS 16 – Pewaukee, Oconomowoc	Interchange
Waukesha	Pewaukee	1.4	2.3	WIS 164 (Pewaukee Road)	
Waukesha	Pewaukee	2.4	3.9	CTH-F – Waukesha, Sussex	Interchange
Waukesha	Brookfield	7.5	12.1	CTH-YY (Pilgrim Road)	Interchange
Milwaukee	Wauwatosa	9.9	15.9	I-41 / US 45 / US 41 – Chicago, Fond du Lac	
Milwaukee	Wauwatosa	10.4	16.7	WIS 100 (North Mayfair Road)	
Milwaukee	Milwaukee	12.5	20.1	WIS 181 (North 76th Street)	
Milwaukee	Milwaukee	12.6	20.3	WIS 175 (West Appleton Road)	
Milwaukee	Milwaukee	14.1	22.7	WIS 145 (West Fond du Lac Avenue)	
Milwaukee	Milwaukee	16.0	25.7	WIS 57 south (North 20th Street)	Western end of WIS 57 concurrency
Milwaukee	Milwaukee	16.8	27.0	WIS 57 north (North Green Bay Avenue) to I-43	Eastern end of WIS 57 concurrency
Milwaukee	Milwaukee	17.0	27.4	North Port Washington Avenue	Interchange
Milwaukee	Shorewood	19.2	30.9	WIS 32 / LMCT (North Lake Drive)	
1.000 mi = 1.609 km; 1.000 km = 0.621 mi: Concurrency terminus
