= Lincoln, Vilas County, Wisconsin =

Lincoln, Wisconsin
- Town
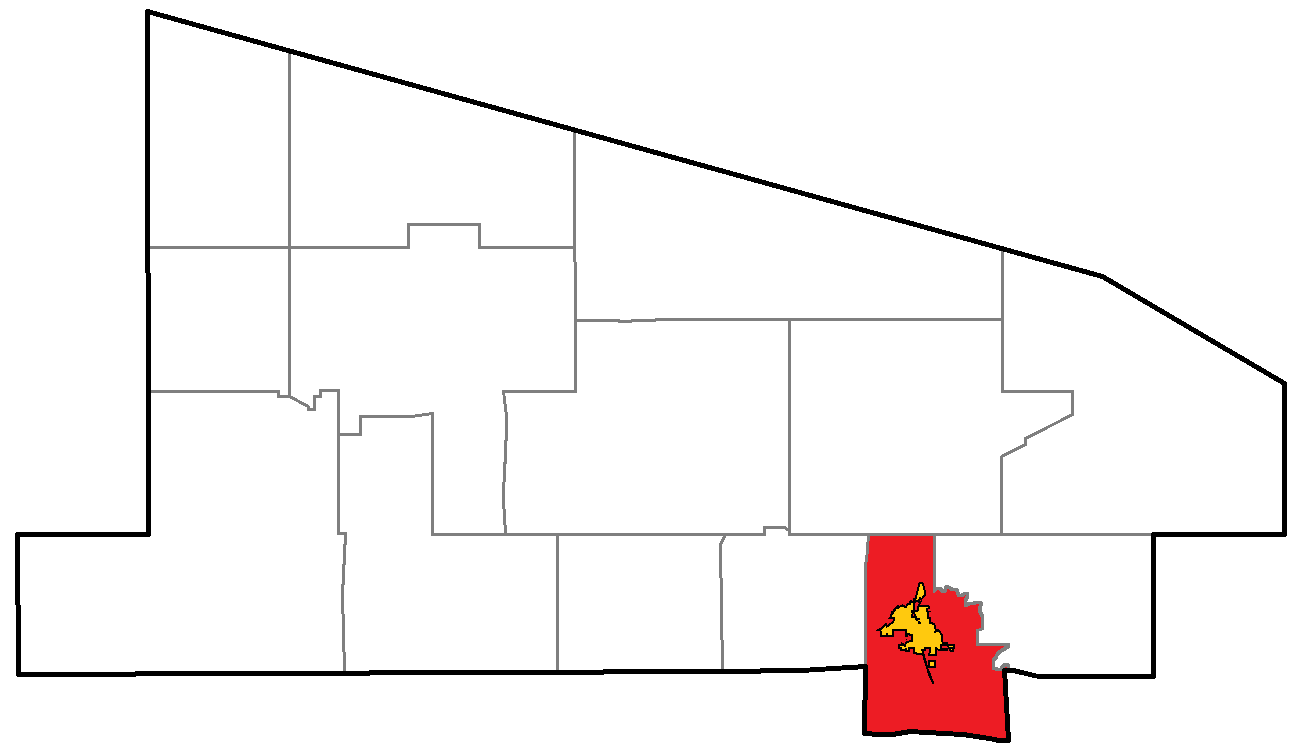
- Location of Lincoln, within Vilas County
- Coordinates: 45°54′45″N 89°14′8″W
- Country: United States
- State: Wisconsin
- County: Vilas

Area
  - Total: 37.1 sq mi (96.2 km^{2})
  - Land: 32.5 sq mi (84.3 km^{2})
  - Water: 4.6 sq mi (11.9 km^{2})
- Elevation: 1,600 ft (500 m)

Population (2020)
  - Total: 2,659
  - Density: 81.7/sq mi (31.5/km^{2})
- Time zone: UTC-6 (Central (CST))
  - Summer (DST): UTC-5 (CDT)
- Area codes: 715 & 534
- FIPS code: 55-44525
- GNIS feature ID: 1583570
- Website: http://www.townoflincolnvilas.com

Lincoln is a town in Vilas County, Wisconsin, United States. The population was 2,659 at the 2020 census.

== Geography ==
According to the United States Census Bureau, the town has a total area of 37.2 square miles (96.2 km^{2}), of which 32.6 square miles (84.3 km^{2}) is land and 4.6 square miles (11.9 km^{2}) (12.38%) is water. The Wisconsin River and the Eagle River flow through the town.

== Demographics ==
As of the census of 2000, there were 2,579 people, 1,111 households, and 785 families residing in the town. The population density was 79.2 people per square mile (30.6/km^{2}). There were 1,873 housing units at an average density of 57.5 per square mile (22.2/km^{2}). The racial makeup of the town was 98.37% White, 0.12% African American, 0.39% Native American, 0.19% Asian, 0.19% from other races, and 0.74% from two or more races. Hispanic or Latino of any race were 0.66% of the population.

There were 1,111 households, out of which 23.8% had children under the age of 18 living with them, 61.1% were married couples living together, 6.3% had a female householder with no husband present, and 29.3% were non-families. 25.0% of all households were made up of individuals, and 12.0% had someone living alone who was 65 years of age or older. The average household size was 2.32 and the average family size was 2.76.

In the town, the population was spread out, with 20.3% under the age of 18, 5.4% from 18 to 24, 24.1% from 25 to 44, 28.9% from 45 to 64, and 21.3% who were 65 years of age or older. The median age was 45 years. For every 100 females, there were 103.2 males. For every 100 females age 18 and over, there were 97.8 males.

The median income for a household in the town was $39,196, and the median income for a family was $45,552. Males had a median income of $30,473 versus $21,581 for females. The per capita income for the town was $18,579. About 4.2% of families and 5.6% of the population were below the poverty line, including 9.1% of those under age 18 and 5.2% of those age 65 or over.
