= Interstate 894 =

Highway in Wisconsin

Interstate 894
- Map of the Milwaukee area with I-894 highlighted in red

Route information
- Auxiliary route of I-94
- Maintained by WisDOT
- Length: 9.92 mi (15.96 km)
- Existed: 1963–present
- History: Completed in 1966
- NHS: Entire route

Major junctions
- West end: I-41 / I-94 / US 41 / US 45 in West Allis
- I-43 / US 45 in Greenfield
- East end: I-41 / I-43 / I-94 / US 41 in Milwaukee

Location
- Country: United States
- State: Wisconsin
- Counties: Milwaukee

Highway system
- Interstate Highway System; Main; Auxiliary; Suffixed; Business; Future; Wisconsin State Trunk Highway System; Interstate; US; State; Scenic; Rustic
← WIS 794	→ US 2

Interstate 894 (I-894) is a 9.92-mile (15.96 km) auxiliary Interstate Highway in Milwaukee County in the US state of Wisconsin. The route serves as a bypass of downtown Milwaukee, connecting with I-94 at the Zoo Interchange west of downtown and the Mitchell Interchange south of downtown. The route runs concurrently with three other highways for its duration, following US Highway 45 (US 45) from the Zoo Interchange to Hale Interchange as the Zoo Freeway, where it separates from US 45 to follow I-43 heading east to the Mitchell Interchange as the Airport Freeway. In local traffic reporting and casual conversation, it is known simply as "the bypass" or "894", with "41" also being more recently used, as I-894 is entirely concurrent with I-41/US 41. The east–west portion is also concurrent with I-43.

I-894 is part of what was proposed to be an extensive freeway network around the Milwaukee area. The Zoo Freeway portion was completed from Beloit Road northward in 1963, and the Airport Freeway and remaining segment of the Zoo Freeway were completed in 1966. I-43 was routed concurrently with I-894 in 1987.

== Route description ==
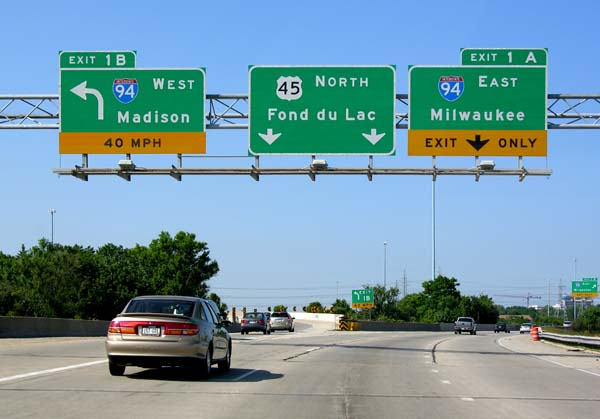
I-894 west at the Zoo Interchange; US 45 now carries the I-41/US 41 designation in the area

I-894 begins at the Zoo Interchange in Milwaukee with I-41, I-94, US 41, and US 45. The highway heads south as part of the Zoo Freeway from this interchange running concurrently with I-41/US 41/US 45. Traffic reports generally refer to this section either as 894 northbound (southbound) or the northbound (southbound) Bypass. North of the Zoo Interchange, I-41/US 41/US 45 continues separately as the north part of the Zoo Freeway. I-894 enters West Allis before its first exit after the interchange; this first exit is a junction with State Trunk Highway 59 (WIS 59), known locally as Greenfield Avenue. After the first three exits, I-894 enters Greenfield. Farther south, I-894 has interchanges with National Avenue, Oklahoma Avenue, and Beloit Road. This section of the bypass is usually congested during rush hour because of traffic on I-894 and merging traffic from the Rock Freeway (I-43). This four-mile (6.4 km) stretch usually has travel times between 10 and 15 minutes during the rush hour (as opposed to five minutes during non-rush-hour times).

The Interstate turns eastward at the Hale Interchange. US 45 turns westbound at that point to follow I-43 (Rock Freeway) south, and I-43 north follows I-894 to the east. The highway becomes the Airport Freeway after the Hale Interchange. Generally, this section is referred to as I-894 eastbound (westbound), as I-43 was not added until the late 1980s. Westbound I-894 has exits to WIS 24 (Forest Home Avenue) after the junction, though the eastbound highway only exits to a nearby local street. I-894 has two more exits after this and meets WIS 36 (Loomis Road) before reentering Milwaukee. It meets WIS 241 (South 27th Street) at exit 9 before terminating at the Mitchell Interchange with I-94, I-43 and US 41; I-43 continues northbound concurrently with I-94.

I-894 passes generally through residential areas for its entire length with the exception of a few commercial districts right next to the freeway such as the Southridge Mall district, along with South 27th Street north to Oklahoma Avenue, which contains multiple car dealerships. With the approximate distance traveled through downtown via I-94 at 11.8 miles (19.0 km), I-894 provides a shorter distance for travelers heading to Chicago or Milwaukee Mitchell International Airport. The Zoo Freeway portion as of 2007 carries at most 170,000 vehicles per day—with the highest values closer to the Zoo Interchange. The Airport Freeway carries up to 134,000 vehicles per day.

== History ==
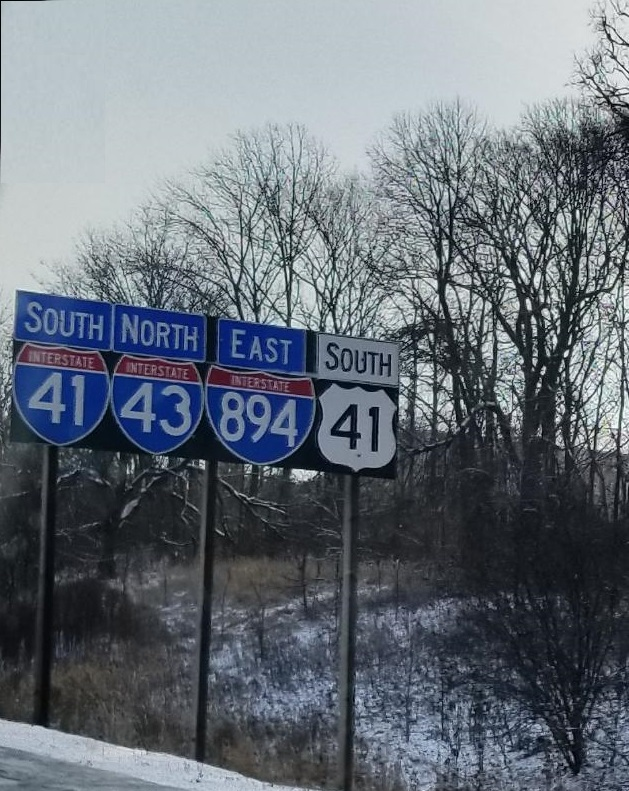
Markers for I-41, I-43, and I-894 on the Airport Freeway, the southern bypass of Milwaukee

The freeways that exist today are only a part of what the Milwaukee County Expressway Commission had hoped would be built by 1972. The Zoo Freeway between Beloit Road and North Avenue was completed in 1963. At that time, the portion between Beloit Road and the Zoo Interchange was signed as I-894. The remainder of the Zoo Freeway to the Hale Interchange was completed in 1966 when the Airport Freeway was constructed. US 45 was rerouted to the freeway, as was WIS 15 south of National Avenue. (The Rock Freeway had also been constructed west to 108th Street at the time.) The Airport Freeway was proposed to be routed to the also-proposed Stadium Freeway South along Howard Avenue which is about 0.75 miles (1.21 km) north of the current alignment and named the Howard Avenue Expressway. The Airport Freeway construction was completed in 1966 to fully open I-894. Both freeways were slated to become part of the Interstate Highway System in 1957, prior to their construction. I-43 was signed along the Airport Freeway concurrently with I-894 in 1988 after being officially designated in 1987, while I-41 was added to the route on April 7, 2015. A remnant of the proposed Stadium Freeway remains connected to I-894 near WIS 36 as an unbuilt interchange. Its three completed ramps are closed to all traffic, and previously had allowed busses access to a park and ride; the fourth ramp was demolished.

== Exit list ==
The entire highway is in Milwaukee County.

Location	mi	km	Exit	Destinations	Notes
Milwaukee	0.00	0.00	1	I-94 – Milwaukee, Madison I-41 north / US 41 north / US 45 north – Fond du Lac	Northern end of I-41/US 41/US 45 concurrency; Zoo Freeway continues northward as I-41/US 41/US 45; signed as exits 1A (east) and 1B (west); Zoo Interchange
West Allis	0.72	1.16	1D	WIS 59 – Greenfield Avenue	
West Allis	1.68	2.70	1E	Lincoln Avenue	Eastbound exit and westbound entrance
West Allis	1.94	3.12	2A	National Avenue	
Greenfield	2.68	4.31	2B	Oklahoma Avenue	Eastbound exit and westbound entrance
Greenfield	3.29	5.29	3	CTH-T (Beloit Road)	
Greenfield	4.38– 4.55	7.05– 7.32	4	I-43 south / US 45 south – Beloit, Chicago	Western end of I-43 concurrency; southern end of US 45 concurrency, I-43 exit 61; Hale Interchange
Greenfield	5.47– 5.95	8.80– 9.58	5A–B	76th–84th Streets	Eastbound exit and westbound entrance
Greenfield	5.75	9.25	5A	WIS 24 west (Forest Home Avenue)	Westbound exit and eastbound entrance
Greenfield	5.95	9.58	5B	CTH-U (76th Street)	Westbound exit and eastbound entrance
Greenfield	6.97	11.22	7	60th Street	
Greenfield	7.97	12.83	8	WIS 36 (Loomis Road)	
Milwaukee	9.01	14.50	9	WIS 241 (27th Street)	No access from I-94 west or to I-94 east
Milwaukee	9.62– 9.92	15.48– 15.96	10	I-43 north / I-94 west – Milwaukee I-41 south / I-94 east / US 41 south – Chicago, Airport	Eastern end of I-41/I-43/US 41 concurrency; signed as exits 10A (north) and 10B (south); Mitchell Interchange
1.000 mi = 1.609 km; 1.000 km = 0.621 mi: Concurrency terminus; Incomplete access
