= U.S. Route 45 in Wisconsin =

Section of U.S. Highway in Wisconsin, United States

U.S. Highway 45
- US 45 highlighted in red

Route information
- Maintained by WisDOT
- Length: 305 mi (491 km)
- Existed: 1935–present

Major junctions
- South end: US 45 in Bristol
- I-43 / WIS 100 in Greenfield; I-41 / I-43 / I-894 / US 41 in Greenfield; I-94 / I-894 in West Allis; US 18 in Wauwatosa; WIS 175 in Milwaukee; I-41 / US 41 in Germantown; US 151 in Fond du Lac; I-41 / US 41 in Oshkosh; US 10 in Winchester; US 8 / WIS 47 in Monico
- North end: US 45 in Land O' Lakes

Location
- Country: United States
- State: Wisconsin
- Counties: Kenosha, Racine, Milwaukee, Waukesha, Washington, Fond du Lac, Winnebago, Outagamie, Waupaca, Shawano, Langlade, Oneida, Vilas

Highway system
- United States Numbered Highway System; List; Special; Divided; Wisconsin State Trunk Highway System; Interstate; US; State; Scenic; Rustic
← WIS 44	→ WIS 45

U.S. Highway 45 (US 45) runs north–south through the eastern and northern portions of the state of Wisconsin. Also called Highway 45, it runs from the state line with Illinois near the village of Bristol in Kenosha County to the Michigan state line at the town of Land O' Lakes in Vilas County, a total of about 305 miles (491 km).

== Route description ==
US 45 enters from Illinois at Pikeville and is a two-lane road up to its junction with WIS 36 southwest of Milwaukee. It runs concurrent with WIS 36 to its junction with WIS 100. As it follows WIS 100 north, it becomes an urban multilane road. It merges onto I-43 north in Greenfield then follows I-894, I-41, and US 41 north from the Hale Interchange one mile (1.6 km) to the east. After I-894 ends at I-94, US 45 continues as a freeway north into Wauwatosa following I-41 and US 41 north of the Zoo Interchange. The two routes split further north with US 45 continuing to West Bend. The freeway section of US 45 ends north of West Bend and continues into Kewaskum as a four-lane highway. North of Kewaskum, it passes through Waucousta and Eden as it approaches Fond du Lac

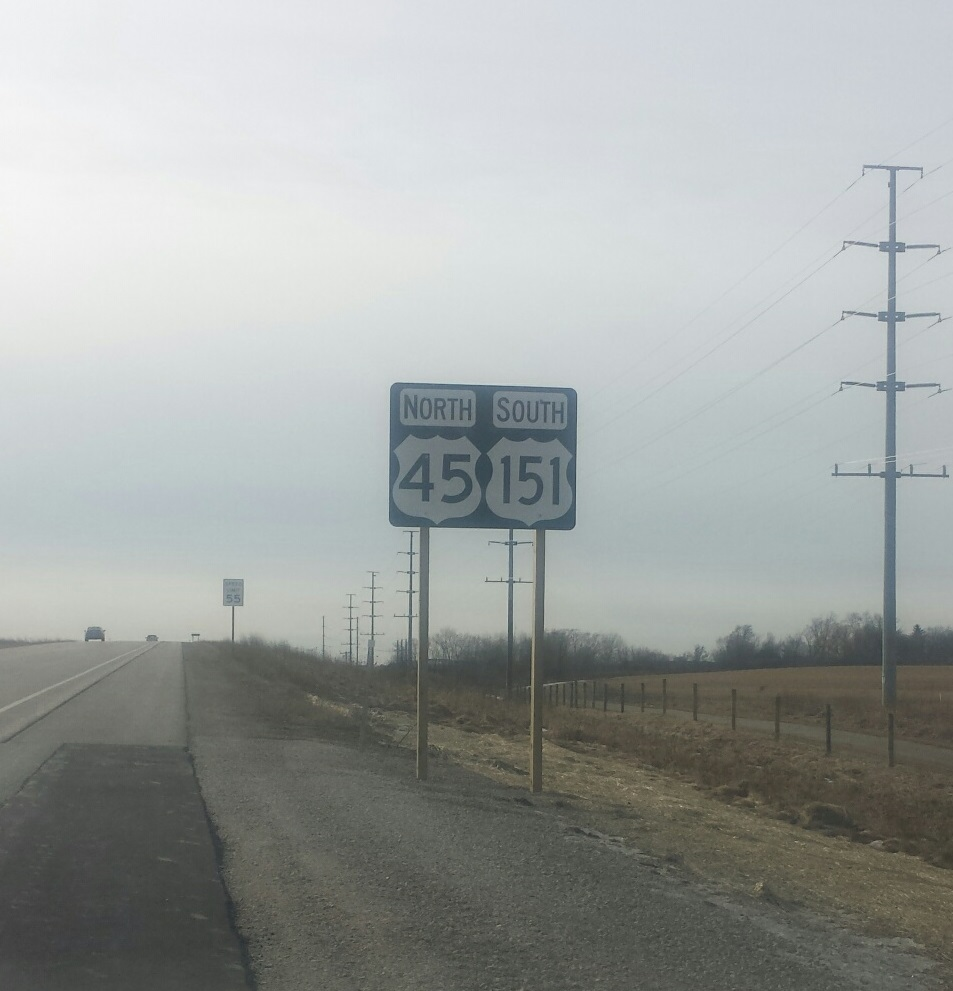
A wrong-way concurrency: northbound US 45 and southbound US 151 south of Fond du Lac, Wisconsin (actual direction of travel is westbound)

US 45 reaches a point just south of Fond du Lac, where it joins US 151 and, in a brief wrong-way concurrency, jogs to the west, where it joins I-41. It then follows I-41 north around Fond du Lac to the junction with WIS 23, and jogs back east, into the center of Fond du Lac, where it then turns north, and follows the shore of Lake Winnebago as a two-lane road, to Oshkosh. It runs through Oshkosh as Main Street, then turns onto Algoma Boulevard, which it follows out of Oshkosh. As it crosses I-41 it becomes a freeway facility to US 10 in Winchester. After briefly joining US 10, US 45 takes a northward track as a two-lane rural road and heads into North Central Wisconsin with the exception of a four-lane expressway between Clintonville and Marion. The route serves as the central street for Antigo and Eagle River and passes into various state and national forest land. The route leaves the state at Land O' Lakes.

== Major intersections ==
County	Location	mi	km	Exit	Destinations	Notes
Kenosha	Village of Bristol	0.00	0.00		US 45 south – Chicago	Continuation into Illinois
Kenosha	Village of Bristol	5.52	8.88		WIS 50 – Lake Geneva, Kenosha	
Kenosha	Community of Paris	10.07	16.21		WIS 142 – Burlington, Kenosha	
Racine	Union Grove	13.35	21.48		WIS 11 – Burlington, Racine	
Racine	Yorkville	17.58	28.29		WIS 20 east – Racine	Southern end of WIS 20 concurrency
Racine	Dover	18.59	29.92		WIS 20 west – Waterford	Northern end of WIS 20 concurrency
Waukesha	Muskego	29.31	47.17		WIS 36 south (Loomis Road)	Southern end of WIS 36 concurrency
Milwaukee	Franklin	31.61	50.87		WIS 36 north (Loomis Road) / WIS 100 south (St. Martins Road)	Northern end of WIS 36 concurrency; southern end of WIS 100 concurrency
Milwaukee	Franklin	33.48	53.88	—	CTH-BB (Rawson Avenue)	Interchange
Milwaukee	Hales Corners	35.11	56.50		WIS 24 (Janesville Road)	
Milwaukee	Greenfield	36.38	58.55	60	I-43 south / WIS 100 north – Beloit	Southern end of I-43 concurrency; northern end of WIS 100 concurrency
Milwaukee	Greenfield	37.12	59.74	4; 61	I-41 south / I-43 north / I-894 east / US 41 south – Milwaukee I-41 north / I-894 west / US 41 north – Fond du Lac	Northern end of I-43 concurrency; southern end of I-41/I-894/US 41 concurrency at the Hale Interchange
Milwaukee	Greenfield	38.27	61.59	3	Beloit Road	
Milwaukee	Greenfield	38.84	62.51	2B	Oklahoma Avenue	Southbound exit and northbound entrance
Milwaukee	West Allis	39.58	63.70	2A	National Avenue	Southbound exit to westbound National Ave only
Milwaukee	West Allis	39.85	64.13	1E	Lincoln Avenue	Southbound exit and northbound entrance
Milwaukee	West Allis	40.8	65.7	1D	WIS 59 (Greenfield Avenue)	
Milwaukee	Milwaukee	41.57	66.90	1; 38	I-94 – Madison, Downtown Milwaukee, Chicago I-894 east	Signed as exits 1A (east) and 1B (west) northbound and exits 38A (west) and 38B (east) southbound; I-94 exit 305; I-894 western terminus; end of I-894 concurrency
Milwaukee	Wauwatosa	42.12	67.79	39	US 18 (Bluemound Road) / Wisconsin Avenue	Northbound exit not signed for Wisconsin Avenue
Milwaukee	Wauwatosa	42.87	68.99	40	Watertown Plank Road	Signed as exits 40A (east) and 40B (west)
Milwaukee	Wauwatosa	43.81	70.51	42A	WIS 100 north (Mayfair Road) / North Avenue east	Southbound exit not signed for WIS 100
Milwaukee	Wauwatosa	44.25	71.21	42B	North Avenue west	
Milwaukee	Wauwatosa	45.34	72.97	43	Burleigh Street	
Milwaukee	Wauwatosa	46.34	74.58	44	WIS 190 (Capitol Drive)	
Milwaukee	Wauwatosa	47.44	76.35	45	CTH-EE (Hampton Avenue)	Butler use exit 45
Milwaukee	Milwaukee	48.28	77.70	46	WIS 100 south (Silver Spring Drive)	Southern end of WIS 100 concurrency
Milwaukee	Milwaukee	49.47	79.61	47	WIS 175 (Appleton Avenue)	
Milwaukee	Milwaukee	50.38	81.08	47B	Good Hope Road	
Milwaukee	Milwaukee	50.64	81.50	48	WIS 145	
Waukesha	Menomonee Falls	53.29	85.76	50	WIS 100 east (Main Street)	Northern end of WIS 100 concurrency; signed as exits 50A (east) and 50B (west)
Waukesha	Menomonee Falls	53.96	86.84	51	Pilgrim Road	Signed as exits 51A (north) and 51B (south)
Waukesha	Menomonee Falls	55.19	88.82	52	CTH-Q (County Line Road) / Alt. I-41 / Alt. US 45	Alternate I-41/Alternate US 45 only signed northbound
Washington	Germantown	57.13	91.94	54	WIS 167 east (Mequon Road) / CTH-Y (Lannon Road)	Southern end of WIS 167 concurrency
Washington	Germantown	60.3	97.0	57	WIS 167 west (Holy Hill Road) / Alt. I-41 / Alt. US 45	Northern end of WIS 167 concurrency; I-41 Alternate/US 41 Alternate only signed southbound
Washington	Richfield	61.54	99.04	59	I-41 north / US 41 north – Fond du Lac	Northbound exit and southbound entrance; northern end of I-41/US 41 concurrency
Washington	Richfield	62.6	100.7	60	WIS 145 south (Fond du Lac Avenue) / CTH-FD west	CTH FD signed on the ramp only
Washington	Jackson			63	WIS 60 – Slinger, Jackson	
Washington	Jackson			65	CTH-PV west (Pleasant Valley Road)	
Washington	West Bend			68	Paradise Drive	
Washington	West Bend			71	WIS 33 / WIS 144 (Washington Street)	
Washington	West Bend			73	CTH-D (Main Street)	
Washington				Northern end of freeway		
Washington	Kewaskum				WIS 28 east – Cascade, Waldo	Southern end of WIS 28 concurrency
Washington	Kewaskum				WIS 28 west – Theresa	Northern end of WIS 28 concurrency
Fond du Lac	Auburn				WIS 67 – Campbellsport, Plymouth	
Fond du Lac	Town of Fond du Lac			164	US 151 north – Manitowoc	Interchange, southern end of US 151 wrong-way concurrency
Fond du Lac	Fond du Lac			95	I-41 south / US 41 south / US 151 south – Milwaukee, Madison	Northern end of US 151 concurrency; southern end of I-41/US 41 concurrency
Fond du Lac	Fond du Lac			97	CTH-VVV (Hickory Street)	
Fond du Lac	Fond du Lac			98	CTH-D (Military Road)	Former US 151
Fond du Lac	Fond du Lac			99	I-41 north / US 41 north / WIS 23 west – Oshkosh, Green Bay	Northern end of I-41/US 41 concurrency; southern end of WIS 23 concurrency
Fond du Lac	Fond du Lac				WIS 23 east (Johnson Street)	Northern end of WIS 23 concurrency
Winnebago	Oshkosh				WIS 44 south (Irving Avenue)	Northern terminus of WIS 44
Winnebago	Oshkosh				WIS 76 north (Jackson Street)	Southern terminus of WIS 76
Winnebago	Oshkosh				WIS 21 west (Algoma Boulevard)	Eastern terminus of WIS 21
Winnebago	Oshkosh			—	I-41 – Milwaukee, Green Bay	Interchange
Winnebago	Oshkosh			—	CTH-T (Ryf Road) to CTH-S	Interchange
Winnebago	Town of Winneconne			—	WIS 116 west / CTH-GG east – Winneconne	Interchange
Winnebago	Winchester			—	CTH-II – Winchester	Interchange (old WIS 150)
Winnebago	Winchester			276	US 10 east – Appleton	Interchange; southern end of US 10 concurrency
Winnebago	Winchester			273	US 10 west – Stevens Point	Interchange; northern end of US 10 concurrency
Waupaca–Outagamie county line					WIS 96 – Fremont, Appleton	
Outagamie	Hortonia				Bus. US 45 north / WIS 15 east / CTH-T – Hortonville	
Outagamie	New London			—	WIS 54 / Bus. US 45 south – Waupaca, Green Bay	Interchange; northbound exit not signed for Bus. US 45
Waupaca	Bear Creek				WIS 22 south / WIS 76 south – Manawa, Bear Creek, Shiocton	Southern end of WIS 22 concurrency
Waupaca	Clintonville				WIS 22 north – Shawano	Northern end of WIS 22 concurrency
Shawano	Marion				WIS 110 south – Marion	Northern terminus of WIS 110
Shawano	Whitcomb				WIS 153 west – Elderon, Mosinee	Eastern terminus of WIS 153
Shawano	Town of Wittenberg			198	WIS 29 east / Bus. WIS 29 / CTH-Q – Green Bay	Southern end of WIS 29 concurrency
Shawano	Wittenberg			196	Bus. WIS 29 / CTH-Q – Wittenberg	Southbound entrance and northbound exit
Shawano	Wittenberg			195	WIS 29 west / Bus. WIS 29 / CTH-M – Wausau	Northern end of WIS 29 concurrency
Shawano	Aniwa				WIS 52 west – Wausau	Southern end of WIS 52 concurrency
Langlade	Rolling				WIS 47 south – Keshena, Shawano	Southern end of WIS 47 concurrency
Langlade	Antigo				WIS 52 east / WIS 64 – Merrill, Langlade	Northern end of WIS 52 concurrency
Oneida	Monico				US 8 west / WIS 47 north – Rhinelander	Northern end of WIS 47 concurrency; southern end of US 8 concurrency
Oneida	Monico				US 8 east – Crandon	Northern end of US 8 concurrency
Oneida	Three Lakes				WIS 32 south – Crandon	Southern end of WIS 32 concurrency
Vilas	Lincoln				WIS 70 east – Florence	Southern end of WIS 70 concurrency
Vilas	Eagle River				WIS 17 south / WIS 70 west – Rhinelander, Woodruff	Northern end of WIS 70 concurrency; southern end of WIS 17 concurrency
Vilas	Lincoln				WIS 17 north – Phelps	Northern end of WIS 17 concurrency
Vilas	Town of Land O' Lakes				US 45 north – Watersmeet, Ontonagon	Continuation into Michigan; northern terminus of WIS 32
1.000 mi = 1.609 km; 1.000 km = 0.621 mi: Concurrency terminus; Incomplete access

== See also ==
U.S. Route 45
Previous state: Illinois	Wisconsin	Next state: Michigan
