= Wisconsin Highway 241 =

Highway in Wisconsin

State Trunk Highway 241
- WIS 241 highlighted in red

Route information
- Maintained by WisDOT
- Length: 12.3 mi (19.8 km)
- Existed: 1999–present

Major junctions
- South end: I-41 / I-94 / US 41 at Town Of Raymond
- I-41 / I-43 / I-894 in Milwaukee
- North end: WIS 24 in Milwaukee

Location
- Country: United States
- State: Wisconsin
- Counties: Racine, Milwaukee

Highway system
- Wisconsin State Trunk Highway System; Interstate; US; State; Scenic; Rustic
← WIS 213	→ WIS 243

State Trunk Highway 241 (often called Highway 241, STH-241 or WIS 241) is a 12.3-mile (19.8 km) state highway in Racine and Milwaukee counties in Wisconsin, United States.

== Route description ==
WIS 241 runs north–south in southeast Wisconsin from the town of Raymond into Milwaukee, mostly along a previous routing of US Highway 41 (US 41), for which it is named. The former US 41 routing north of the Milwaukee–Racine county line is locally known as 27th Street.

== History ==
WIS 241 was created in 1999 when state highway officials decided to reroute US 41 off South 27th Street in Milwaukee. The change was done because residents on the section north of West Forest Home Avenue objected to a proposed widening project. In response, the entire section of US 41 from the Milwaukee–Racine county line to the Stadium Freeway (also known as WIS 341) was moved east to run on the North–South Freeway with Interstate 94 (I-94). This would eventually lead to the designation of the new US 41 routing along Interstate 894 and onto I-94 south as Interstate 41 in 2015.

Until a reconstruction in 2018, the southern terminus of the highway was through a direct merger via north-south ramps with I-94 at the county line. The ramp was then removed, and its terminus was moved a mile south to Seven Mile Road along the western I-94, where it turns onto for a quarter mile from the west I-94 frontage road and terminates at the northbound on/off ramp with I-94.

== Major intersections ==
County	Location	mi	km	Destinations	Notes
Racine	Raymond–Caledonia line	0.00	0.00	I-41 / I-94 / US 41 – Chicago, Milwaukee	Southern terminus; exit 326 on I-94; road continues east as Seven Mile Road
Racine	Raymond–Caledonia line	1.57	2.53	I-41 south / I-94 east / US 41 south – Chicago	Closed; former southern terminus; exit 325 on I-94
Milwaukee	Oak Creek–Franklin line	3.47	5.58	WIS 100 (Ryan Road)	
Milwaukee	Milwaukee–Greenfield line	9.48	15.26	CTH-Y (Layton Avenue) to I-41 south / I-94 east / US 41 south	Serves General Mitchell International Airport
Milwaukee	Milwaukee–Greenfield line	9.72	15.64	I-41 / I-43 / I-894 west / US 41 to I-94 west – Downtown Milwaukee, Beloit, Madison	Exit 9 on I-894
Milwaukee	Milwaukee	10.87	17.49	WIS 36 south (Loomis Road)	
Milwaukee	Milwaukee	12.3	19.8	WIS 24 west (Forest Home Avenue)	Northern terminus of WIS 241; eastern terminus of WIS 24; road continues as 27th Street
1.000 mi = 1.609 km; 1.000 km = 0.621 mi: Closed/former
