= Wisconsin Highway 100 =

State highway in Milwaukee and Waukesha counties in Wisconsin, United States

State Trunk Highway 100
- WIS 100 highlighted in red

Route information
- Maintained by WisDOT
- Length: 39.69 mi (63.87 km)

Major junctions
- South end: WIS 32 / LMCT in Oak Creek
- I-41 / I-94 / US 41 in Oak Creek; US 45 / WIS 36 in Franklin; I-43 / US 45 in Greenfield; I-94 in West Allis; US 18 in Wauwatosa; US 45 in Wauwatosa; US 45 in Milwaukee; I-41 / US 41 / WIS 175 in Milwaukee; I-41 / US 41 / US 45 in Menomonee Falls
- North end: I-43 / WIS 32 / LMCT in Bayside

Location
- Country: United States
- State: Wisconsin
- Counties: Milwaukee, Waukesha

Highway system
- Wisconsin State Trunk Highway System; Interstate; US; State; Scenic; Rustic
← WIS 99	→ WIS 101

State Trunk Highway 100 (STH-100, commonly known as Highway 100 or WIS 100) is a road which encircles the outer edges of Milwaukee County, Wisconsin, United States.

== Route description ==
The road is designed as a bypass around the city of Milwaukee, but with residential and commercial development along WIS 100 on almost all portions of the road, this purpose has been negated, and it serves as one of the Milwaukee area's major commercial corridors. WIS 100 roughly parallels the freight railroad beltway around Milwaukee constructed in 1912 by the Chicago and North Western Transportation Company, approximately one mile inside the north, west and south county lines.

In Milwaukee's immediate western suburb Wauwatosa, WIS 100's north–south segment was once known as Lovers Lane; parts of the road still have this designation. In the vicinity of Mayfair Shopping Center, it is known as Mayfair Road; this corresponds to 108th street in Milwaukee's numbered roadways scheme.

The roadway served the Muirdale Tuberculosis Sanatorium and County Airfield and Limestone Quarry at what is now Currie Park. In the late 1950s, due to the combination of ready roadway and rail access, the area experienced an employment boom as several large cold storage warehouses and food-related truck terminals were constructed nearby. With the development of Mayfair in 1958 by malting scion Kurtis Froedtert, the name was changed to Mayfair Road.

One of the few vestiges of this earlier era is the roadway's popularity as a cruising strip for mainly young motorists showing off their vehicles. West Allis and Milwaukee eventually cooperated to attempt to outlaw cruising on the road as a violation of unlawful assembly statutes, which result in the fining of drivers and impoundment of their vehicles. Signs are posted along the road to remind motorists of the law, including in West Allis, where the threshold is the passing of a controlled point more than three times in a certain period.

== History ==
Between 1920 and 1923, WIS 100 was designated via parts of modern-day WIS 138 and US 51. The entirety was replaced by a new alignment of WIS 10.

The current alignment of WIS 100 was initially a county-constructed concrete loop highway known as County Trunk Highway L. WIS 100 was then assigned in 1923 along part of the county highway as well as WIS 15 (now superseded by US 41) and WIS 74.

== Major intersections ==
County	Location	mi	km	Exit	Destinations	Notes
Milwaukee	Oak Creek				WIS 32 (Chicago Rd) / LMCT – Milwaukee, Racine	
Milwaukee	Oak Creek				WIS 38 (Howell Avenue)	
Milwaukee	Oak Creek				I-41 / I-94 / US 41 – Milwaukee, Chicago	
Milwaukee	Oak Creek–Franklin line				WIS 241 (27th Street)	
Milwaukee	Franklin				US 45 south / WIS 36 (Loomis Road) – Burlington	Southern end of US 45 concurrency
Milwaukee	Franklin			—	Rawson Avenue (CTH-BB)	Interchange
Milwaukee	Hales Corners				WIS 24 (Janesville Road)	
Milwaukee	Greenfield				I-43 north / US 45 north to I-894	Northern end of US 45 concurrency; no access to southbound I-43 or from northbound I-43
Milwaukee	Greenfield				Layton Avenue (CTH-Y) to I-43 south	Completes access to I-43
Milwaukee	West Allis				WIS 59 (Greenfield Avenue)	
Milwaukee	West Allis				I-94 – Milwaukee, Madison	
Milwaukee	Wauwatosa				US 18 (Bluemound Road)	
Milwaukee	Wauwatosa				I-41 north / US 45 north	Northbound entrance only; no exit ramps
Milwaukee	Wauwatosa				WIS 190 (Capitol Drive)	
Milwaukee	Milwaukee			46	I-41 south / US 41 south / US 45 south / CTH-E (Silver Spring Drive)	Southern end of I-41/US 41/US 45 concurrency
Milwaukee	Milwaukee			47A	WIS 175 (Appleton Avenue)	No northbound access from southbound roadways; no southbound access from northbound roadways
Milwaukee	Milwaukee			47B	Good Hope Road	
Milwaukee–Waukesha county line	Milwaukee–Menomonee Falls line			48	WIS 145	
Waukesha	Menomonee Falls			50A	I-41 north / US 41 north / US 45 north – Fond du Lac	Northern end of I-41/US 41/US 45 concurrency
Waukesha–Milwaukee county line	Menomonee Falls–Milwaukee line				WIS 145 south	
Milwaukee	Milwaukee			—	WIS 181 (76th Street)	Interchange
Milwaukee	Brown Deer				WIS 57 (Green Bay Road)	Former interchange
Milwaukee	River Hills–Bayside– Fox Point tripoint				I-43 / WIS 32 / LMCT – Milwaukee, Green Bay	Currently being rebuilt into a diverging diamond interchange
1.000 mi = 1.609 km; 1.000 km = 0.621 mi: Concurrency terminus; Incomplete access
