= Freeways of Milwaukee =

Freeways in the Milwaukee metropolitan area
- Highway markers for I‑43, US 41, and WIS 145
- Map of existing (in red) and unbuilt (in blue) freeways in Milwaukee metropolitan area

Highway names
- Interstates: Interstate nn (I‑nn)
- US Highways: US Highway nn (US nn)
- State: Wisconsin Highway nn (WIS nn)

System links
- Wisconsin State Trunk Highway System; Interstate; US; State; Scenic; Rustic

In Milwaukee, freeways were constructed in response to an increase in automobile ownership in the late 1940s. Road plans were drawn up in the 1950s through the 1970s and several freeways were built.

A lack of foresight resulted in several communities experiencing sharp increases in property taxes such as in West Milwaukee, or the complete destruction of vibrant, African-American neighborhoods such as Bronzeville. After a decade of aggressive highway building in the 1960s, support for freeway construction began to wane as neighborhoods started to oppose construction. With the election of John Norquist as mayor in 1988, Milwaukee began to undo some of the damage of its highway construction. The dismantling of the Park East Freeway north of downtown led to a housing and entertainment construction boom and is the location of Fiserv Forum.

== History ==
After World War II, the population of Milwaukee grew dramatically. While the overall population of Milwaukee grew 8.5% during the 1940s, the population of African-Americans grew 146.8%, an increase of nearly 13,000 residents. With the influx of new residents, it became clear that the city's aging road network was not sufficient to handle the new levels of traffic. In 1946, the Milwaukee Common Council carried out a study to determine the feasibility of new superhighways through the city. By the time the proposals were handed to voters in the form of a referendum in 1948, thirteen routes were planned for the area including the East–West and North–South freeways. Construction began in earnest in 1952. In the meantime, automobile ownership in the city had increased by 61 percent.

Also on the ballot in 1948 was a hotly contested mayoral race between Frank Zeidler, the Socialist candidate, and Henry S. Reuss, then a Republican. Before the war, Milwaukee had a tradition of pay-as-you-go financing, where projects are funded by current funds rather than incurring debt. An organization of business and civic leaders called the 1948 Corporation sought to modernize the city with capital projects, such as the North–South Freeway, Milwaukee County Stadium, and the Milwaukee Arena. In order to realize these goals, the 1948 Corporation wanted the city to break free of its "socialist traditions" and borrow money for these projects. Both candidates publicly supported public financing the highway project, though Ruess attacked Zeidler's socialist ideology in the media. Zeidler, having support of the working-class whites in southern Milwaukee, won the election easily.

Initially, the Common Council was in charge of planning the freeway system. As the project grew in size and scope, chiefly outside the city limits of Milwaukee, the Milwaukee County Expressway Commission (MCEC) was created in 1953. That organization released their first report two years later. In it, they called for $221 million worth of highways (equivalent to $2.01 billion in 2024) to be completed by 1972. As the United States was in the midst of the Cold War with the Soviet Union, the MCEC touted the planned freeways as a fire break in case the city was bombed. The creation of the Interstate Highway System in 1956 gave the MCRC some additional funds for highway construction. The Interstate 94 name was applied to the North–South Freeway from the south to downtown and to the East–West Freeway entirely.

Through the late 1950s, the highway building project grew outside of Milwaukee County. The State of Wisconsin created the Southeastern Wisconsin Regional Planning Commission (SEWRPC) as a result. The SEWRPC took over the planning functions from the MCEC, which kept the engineering and construction functions. The SEWRPC published a report stating their vision for the Milwaukee area's highway network in 1966. They proposed 16 routes in all; some of which were already built or were under construction. They proposed the construction of six freeways: the Lake, Belt, Stadium, Bay, Park and Fond du Lac freeways. The Park and Lake freeways would complete an inner loop around downtown Milwaukee.

National trends supported freeway construction. President Eisenhower had admired Germany's multi-lane Autobahn after World War II and supported the well-financed Interstate Highway System. Building on initial suggestions by Franklin Delano Roosevelt, Eisenhower asked Lucius D. Clay to lead a committee that would develop standards for a new freeway system to promote to Congress. Regarding Milwaukee, the Eisenhower administration had debated whether to penetrate cities with freeways, with Frank Cutler Turner arguing successfully that they should.

=== Construction ===
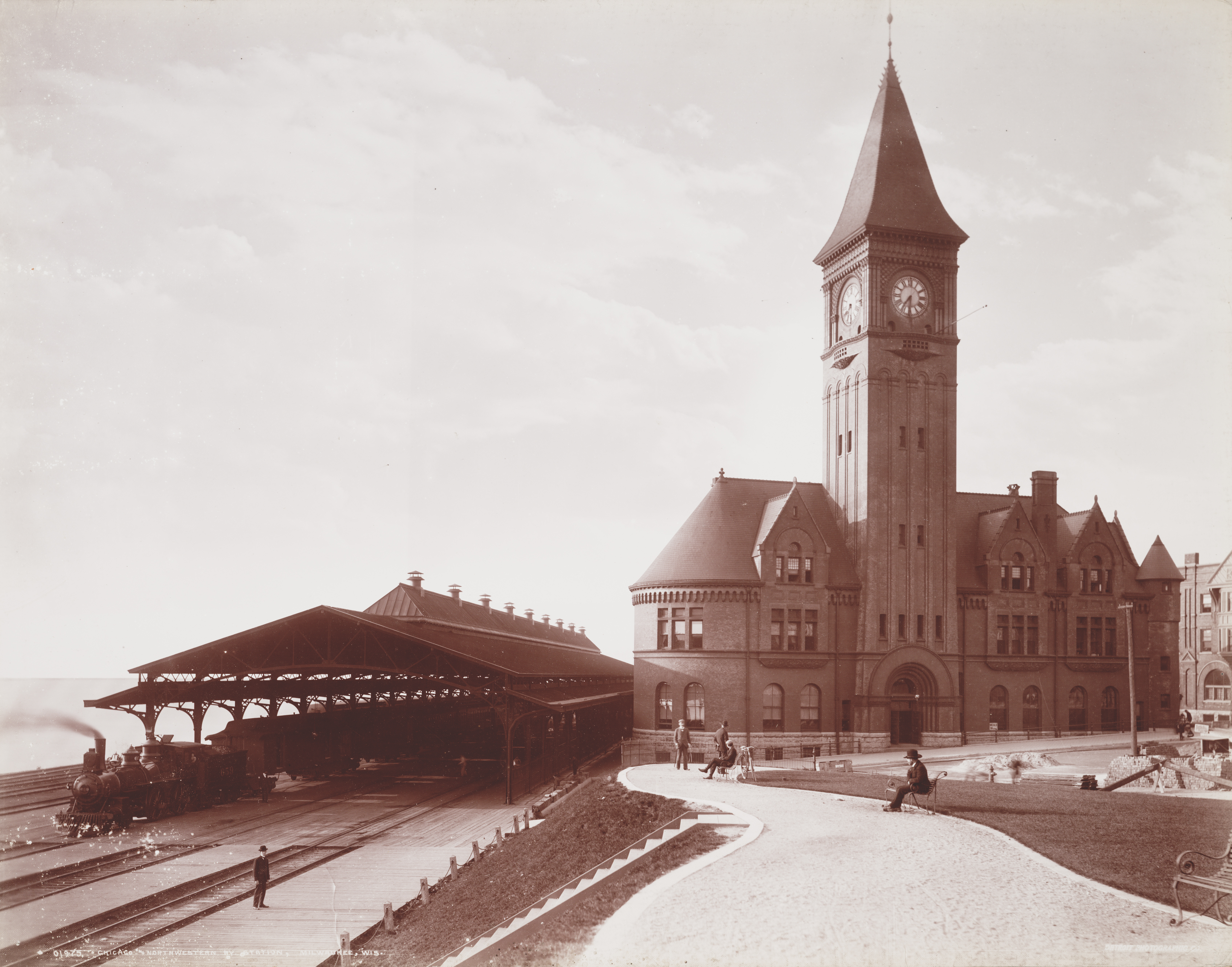
The Lake Front Depot was purchased by Milwaukee County in 1964 and torn down in 1968 with the intent of using the land for the Lake Freeway.

Freeway construction began aggressively in the 1960s. These initial guilds had a large impact on African American neighborhoods. Several Landmarks were torn down, including the Lake Front Depot and Borchert Field. This was possible through the MCEC's confiscatory power over land. They acquired large chunks of land to cut through neighborhoods. As the land was converted to freeway land, property taxes grew since the city's tax base shrunk. In particular, West Milwaukee had significant growth in taxes.

=== Opposition ===
After initial construction, neighborhood resistance began in Sherman Park and Bay View neighborhoods. The Sherman Park neighborhood resistance prevented the construction of the Park West Freeway. The Bay View neighborhood approved of ideas of the freeway, but not at the expense of 600 homes. Meetings were heated, and led to bomb threats.

The 1974 referendums were a pivotal turning point. Several proposed freeways were approved by voters: the Airport Spur, Park West, Stadium to I-894, Park East/Downtown Loop, and Lake Expressway. But only the Airport Spur was built. Incomplete freeways include the 1975 'Gap Closure Freeway' proposed to link Fond du Lac and Stadium freeways. The MCEC was disbanded by the state in 1979 before any construction took place.

The Park East freeway was targeted by Norquist for removal. It was underutilized and blighted. The only constructed section of the Park Freeway was torn down in 1999. Since its removal, a form of urban renaissance occurred. Property values rose as businesses and attractions, such as Fiserv Forum, were built on or near the land on which the Park East Freeway lay.

== Named freeways ==
=== Airport Freeway ===
Airport Freeway
- Location: Hale Interchange to the Mitchell Interchange
- Length: 5 mi (8.0 km)

The Airport Freeway is the name of the east–west portion of I-894, which is concurrent with I-41, I-43, and US 41. It begins at the Hale Interchange and ends at the Mitchell Interchange, where it meets I-94.

=== Airport Spur ===
State Trunk Highway 119
- Location: I-41/I-94 to Milwaukee Mitchell International Airport
- Length: 1.9 mi (3.1 km)

The Airport Spur is a connector freeway in Milwaukee, Wisconsin. The 1.89-mile (3.04 km) freeway connects Interstate Highway 94 to the Milwaukee Mitchell International Airport. It is signed as Wisconsin Highway 119 (STH 119). The current route starts at Interstate 41/Interstate 94 and has just one more exit at Wisconsin Highway 38 (Howell Avenue) before ending at the airport. Until 2007, STH 119 was not signed but was commissioned and appeared on highway maps as an unsigned highway. After travelers in the area became confused because the route was not signed, officials decided to change the exit signs from I-94 in order to include the highway.

=== Bay Freeway ===
The Bay Freeway was the name of a proposed freeway in Milwaukee. No portion of the freeway was constructed. It was intended to be an east–west freeway running on the north side of the city. It was to begin at Interstate 43 (I-43) in Glendale, near Hampton Avenue. From there it would run westerly to the proposed interchange with the Stadium Freeway and the Fond du Lac Freeway. The Bay Freeway would have overlapped the Fond du Lac Freeway for approximately two miles (3.2 km) before splitting off and continuing westward, intersecting the Zoo Freeway and continuing through Menomonee Falls and Pewaukee before joining Wisconsin Highway 16.

=== Belt Freeway ===
The Belt Freeway was a proposed beltway through the western and southern suburbs of Milwaukee. It was planned to begin at the Lake Freeway southeast of the Milwaukee Mitchell International Airport and end at the Fond du Lac Freeway in the northwest suburbs. It was to run parallel to the Airport and Zoo Freeways, both of which were constructed.

=== East–West Freeway ===
East–West Freeway
- Location: Western suburbs to the Marquette Interchange
- Length: 30 mi (48 km)

The East–West Freeway, also called the East–West Corridor, is the name of I-94 as it enters the Milwaukee metro from the west until it reaches the Marquette Interchange and the portion of I-794 between the Marquette Interchange and the Lake Freeway in downtown Milwaukee.

=== Fond du Lac Freeway ===
Fond du Lac Freeway
- Location: Northern Milwaukee toward northwestern suburbs

The Fond du Lac Freeway is a reconstruction of Milwaukee's Fond du Lac Avenue. It begins near the intersection of Fond du Lac Avenue, N. 68th Street, and W. Hampton Avenue and heads northwest toward Fond du Lac.

=== Lake Freeway ===
Lake Freeway
- Location: Marquette Interchange to the Lake Michigan coast

The Lake Freeway, also known as I-794, is an Interstate Highway spur route in Milwaukee County in the U.S. state of Wisconsin. I-794 is one of two auxiliary Interstates in the Milwaukee metropolitan area and serves the lakefront, the Port of Milwaukee and connects downtown with the southeastern suburbs of St. Francis, Cudahy and South Milwaukee.

=== North–South Freeway ===
North–South Freeway
- Location: Southern suburbs through downtown to northern suburbs
- Length: 49 mi (79 km)

The North–South Freeway is the main north–south highway through Milwaukee. It runs roughly parallel to the coast of Lake Michigan. As it enters the Milwaukee metropolitan area, it carries I-41 and I-94. At the interchange with I-894, the Mitchell Interchange, I-41 leaves away and I-43 enters the roadway. At the Marquette Interchange, I-94 exits to the west and I-794 begins to the east. The freeway continues north as I-43 toward Green Bay.

=== Park Freeway ===
Park Freeway
- Location: I-43 to Jefferson Avenue (as built)
- Existed: 1971–2002

The Park Freeway was a planned and partially constructed freeway in Milwaukee. The freeway removal policy resulted in the demolition of the Park East Freeway, the only section to have been completed. The planned eastern terminus of the Park Freeway in downtown Milwaukee was near Prospect Avenue and Ogden Avenue. At that point, the freeway was to turn southward as the Lake Freeway. The Park East Freeway, as built, extended from Jefferson Street westward to Interstate 43, carrying Highway 145. From I-43, the Park West Freeway was to continue northwesterly to just north of North Avenue. From there, it would continue westward to its intersection with the Stadium Freeway.

The right of way for the entire Park Freeway was purchased and cleared. However, only a small portion was ever built - between North 12th Street and North Jefferson Street. Because of opposition of the freeway by community leaders, the remainder of the freeway was never built, and the right of way lay vacant for years. Much of the land has been redeveloped. The only built portion was demolished beginning in 2002, most of which was replaced by an improved at-grade West McKinley Avenue and East Knapp Street and a new vertical-lift bridge over the Milwaukee River.

Redevelopment of the cleared freeway right-of-way was slowed by the economic recession that started in 2008. Milwaukee School of Engineering constructed an athletic facility. Commercial developments include a hotel and offices. A new arena and related structures for the NBA Milwaukee Bucks are also using some of the former right-of-way. Development has occurred on land adjacent to the former right-of-way, which is no longer overshadowed by the elevated freeway.

=== Rock Freeway ===
Rock Freeway
- Location: Southwestern suburbs to the Hale Interchange
- Length: 18 mi (29 km)

The Beloit-to-Milwaukee portion of I-43 was given the name "Rock Freeway," named because the freeway traverses Rock County and heads towards the cities in the Rock River valley, including Rockford, Illinois. However, the moniker generally only applies to the portion of the route in Waukesha and Milwaukee counties; freeway names in southeastern Wisconsin media are used interchangeably with Interstate numbers.

=== Stadium Freeway ===
Stadium Freeway
- Location: Miller Park to the Lisbon Avenue

The Stadium Freeway (also known as Miller Park Way) is a six-lane divided highway traveling south to north in the city of Milwaukee, Wisconsin. This freeway was the first road of its kind built in Milwaukee County. It is designated as Wisconsin Highway 175 (WI 175) along its northern stretch from WIS 59, past Interstate 94 (I-94) to Lisbon Avenue.

The southern portion from I-94 to National Avenue was designated as unsigned WIS 341 from August 1999 to August 2015, and was called Miller Park Way; it is now named Brewers Boulevard. The road travels adjacent to the east side of American Family Field, home of Major League Baseball's Milwaukee Brewers.

=== West Bend Freeway ===
West Bend Freeway
- Location: Richfield interchange at Fond du Lac Freeway to CTH-D/Kettle Moraine Scenic Drive

The West Bend Freeway or West Bend Bypass is a portion of US 45 that connects the Fond du Lac freeway with West Bend. Originally built in 1986 as a super two, the freeway was expanded to four lanes in 1990.

=== Zoo Freeway ===
Zoo Freeway
- Location: Hale Interchange to the Fond du Lac Freeway

The Zoo Freeway is the name of a portion of US 45, which is concurrent with I-41 and US 41, as well as the north–south portion of I-894, which ends at I-94. It begins at the Hale Interchange and ends at the Fond du Lac Freeway in northern Milwaukee.

== Named interchanges ==
Map of interchanges in the Milwaukee area: 1. Hale Interchange; 2. Zoo Interchange; 3. Stadium Interchange; 4. Marquette Interchange; 5. Mitchell Interchange

=== Hale Interchange ===
The Hale Interchange is located southwest of Milwaukee in Greenfield, though it takes its name from nearby Hales Corners. It is a directional T interchange that connects the Zoo Freeway from the north, the Airport Freeway from the east, and the Rock Freeway from the southwest.

=== Zoo Interchange ===
The Zoo Interchange is located in western Milwaukee near the Milwaukee Zoo. It connects the East–West Freeway and the Zoo Freeway. The interchange was originally constructed with ramps exiting and entering the highways from the desired directions of travel, i.e. take the left exit to go left. A total reconstruction project began in 2014 to move all entrances and exits to the outside lanes of the highways in order to reduce dangerous weaving in and out of traffic. Construction was scheduled to be completed in 2018, but budget restructuring delayed the project. The core was finished in time, but other aspects would not be completed until 2022.

=== Stadium Interchange ===
The Stadium Interchange is located in central Milwaukee near American Family Field. It connects the East–West Freeway to the Stadium Freeway the north and Brewers Boulevard to the south.

=== Marquette Interchange ===
The Marquette Interchange is located near downtown Milwaukee near Marquette University, from which the stack interchange gets its name. It connects the East–West Freeway to the North–South Freeway, as well as the Lake Freeway. Planning began in 1957, but construction did not begin until 1964. City and state officials opened the interchange with a ribbon cutting on December 23, 1968. At the time, it was noted that rush-hour drive times were cut to one-third of what they were previously. The interchange was entirely rebuilt between 2004 and 2008.

=== Mitchell Interchange ===
The Mitchell Interchange is located in southern Milwaukee near the Milwaukee Mitchell International Airport. It connects the North–South Freeway and the Airport Freeway. It was entirely reconstructed between 2009 and 2012. The new configuration features three cut-and-cover tunnels and safer freeway entrances and exits.
