= Stadium Freeway (Wisconsin) =

Highway in Wisconsin

- Stadium Freeway highlighted in red

Route information
- Component highways: WIS 175

Major junctions
- South end: WIS 59 in West Milwaukee
- I-94 in Milwaukee
- North end: Lisbon Avenue

Location
- Country: United States
- State: Wisconsin

Highway system
- Wisconsin State Trunk Highway System; Interstate; US; State; Scenic; Rustic

The Stadium Freeway (also known as Miller Park Way) is a six-lane divided highway traveling south to north in the city of Milwaukee, Wisconsin. This freeway was the first road of its kind built in Milwaukee County. It is designated as Wisconsin Highway 175 (WI 175) along its northern stretch from WIS 59, past Interstate 94 (I-94) to Lisbon Avenue.

The southern portion from I-94 to National Avenue was designated as unsigned WIS 341 from August 1999 to August 2015, and is called Miller Park Way. The road travels adjacent to the east side of American Family Field, home of Major League Baseball's Milwaukee Brewers.

== History ==
This freeway is the stump of what was to be a much larger freeway in Milwaukee. The Stadium Freeway, originally called the South 44th Street Expressway, was intended to extend much farther to the north and south than it currently does:

- The Stadium Freeway was to continue northward from its present terminus at Lisbon Avenue, where it was to intersect with the proposed Park West Freeway. It was to continue northward, intersecting with the proposed Bay and Fond du Lac freeways, and continuing northward to the city of Port Washington.
- The Stadium Freeway was to continue southward from its present terminus at National Avenue, and terminate at I-43/I-894. In fact, the interchange that was supposed to connect the Stadium Freeway to the Airport Freeway (I-43/I-894) was built entirely as the Greenfield Interchange. The interchange was renovated by having one of the ramps (eastbound I-894/I-43 to northbound Stadium Freeway) removed, and as of 2009 the other ramps connected to a park and ride. In 2012, during the reconstruction of the Mitchell Interchange and the WIS 241/South 27th Street exit, another ramp (southbound Stadium Freeway to westbound I-894/I-43) was removed. This currently leaves only two ramps remaining to the original interchange.
- This highway once carried U.S. Route 41 (US 41) in Wisconsin, but became WIS 175 when US 41 was moved to its current alignment with I-41 and the Zoo Freeway.

== Exit list ==
The entire route is in Milwaukee County.

Location	mi	km	Destinations	Notes
West Milwaukee			WIS 59	Southern terminus
West Milwaukee			Frederick Miller Way	Miller Park Parking uses this exit.
Milwaukee			I-94 / WIS 175	Exit 308C on I-94. Roadway continues as WIS 175.
Milwaukee			US 18 (Wisconsin Avenue / Wells Street)	To Blue Mound Road
Milwaukee			Martin Drive / Alois Drive	Signed for Martin Drive northbound and Alois Drive southbound
Milwaukee			Washington Boulevard	Northbound exit only
Milwaukee			Lloyd Street	Northbound exit and entrance only
Milwaukee			WIS 175 (Lisbon Avenue)	Northern terminus
1.000 mi = 1.609 km; 1.000 km = 0.621 mi: Incomplete access
