= Wisconsin Highway 341 =

Former Highway in Wisconsin

State Trunk Highway 341
- Miller Park Way
- Former WIS 341 highlighted in red

Route information
- Maintained by WisDOT
- Length: 1.0 mi (1.6 km)
- Existed: August 1999–August 2015

Major junctions
- South end: WIS 59 in West Milwaukee
- North end: I-94 / WIS 175 in Milwaukee

Location
- Country: United States
- State: Wisconsin
- Counties: Milwaukee

Highway system
- Wisconsin State Trunk Highway System; Interstate; US; State; Scenic; Rustic
| ← WIS 318 | → WIS 441 |

State Trunk Highway 341 (STH 341, WIS 341), better known as Miller Park Way and currently Brewers Boulevard, refers to a former unsigned route designation of a segment of the oldest freeway in Milwaukee, Wisconsin, United States. It connects Interstate 94 (I-94) to WIS 59 (National Avenue), with a single set of off-ramps to Canal Street and American Family Field's parking lots.

The road is currently designated as Brewers Boulevard within Milwaukee city limits (including the American Family Field campus). South of National Avenue, the roadway continues as Miller Park Way in West Milwaukee village limits, despite the stadium's new naming rights; the village's board voted down a rename based on a misunderstanding that the Brewers would not reimburse the village and all businesses along the Miller Park Way corridor for associated costs involving an address change. Re-entering Milwaukee at Lincoln Avenue, the roadway then continues on as South 43rd Street for its traditional position in the Milwaukee street grid.

== Route description ==
WIS 341, now Brewers Boulevard, starts at an intersection with National Avenue and Miller Park Way. The highway continues north across a rail line to a folded diamond interchange with Parkway Drive, Frederick Miller Way and General Mitchell Boulevard. This interchange provides access to American Family Field and its surrounding parking lots. The highway continues north, and the WIS 341 designation terminated at an interchange with I-94 and WIS 175, along with the Brewers Boulevard designation. The northern continuation of the roadway is WIS 175 along the Stadium Freeway. Ultimately, the WIS 175 designation replaced that of WIS 341.

== History ==
WIS 341 was commissioned in 1999 after the reopening of the Stadium Freeway between I-94 and National Avenue. Due to the construction of Miller Park, the reconstituted roadway shifted its footprint to the east by a few hundred yards. It was rebuilt as an arterial highway with a 45-mile-per-hour (72 km/h) speed limit and carried the designation US 41, when it reopened on August 6, 1998. US 41 was later rerouted in 1999 when the proposed plan to widen Layton Boulevard was successfully blocked by residents and city officials. Because Layton would no longer meet state highway standards, US 41 was rerouted to follow I-94. The section of the Stadium Freeway south of I-94 was given the WIS 341 designation in August 1999.

The Stadium Freeway, originally known as the South 44th Street Expressway for the street it would replace, was opened for traffic in 1953, just as the new Milwaukee County Stadium was opening to host the Milwaukee Braves of the National League of Major League Baseball. Original plans were to have the freeway extend south from National Avenue to the Airport Freeway in Greenfield (what is now I-894, I-41, and I-43). The interchange at I-894 was built, but since the Stadium Freeway was never completed to connect to it, and the ramps instead led to a park and ride lot at the corner of Loomis and Cold Spring Roads for commuter buses until I-894 was reconstructed in the 2010s and the ramp stubs were removed (said lot remains accessible via Loomis Road). Because of lawsuits and protest, the southern extension was never built, though most of the right-of-way for the freeway was cleared down to Lincoln Avenue in West Milwaukee. This section of South 43rd Street was renamed Miller Park Way in 2001, after the new park had opened.

== Major intersections ==
The entire route was in Milwaukee County.

| Location | mi | km | Destinations | Notes |
|---|---|---|---|---|
| West Milwaukee–Milwaukee line | 0.0 | 0.0 | WIS 59 | Southern terminus |
| Milwaukee | 0.5 | 0.80 | Canal Street | Interchange; exit for Miller Park |
| Milwaukee | 1.0 | 1.6 | I-94 / WIS 175 | Northern terminus; exit 308B-C on I-94 |
1.000 mi = 1.609 km; 1.000 km = 0.621 mi
