= Marquette Interchange =

Interchange in Milwaukee, Wisconsin

Location
- Milwaukee, Wisconsin
- Coordinates: 43.036252°N 87.924726°W
- Roads at junction: I-43; I-94; I-794

Construction
- Type: Hybrid
- Constructed: 1956
- Maintained by: WisDOT

The Marquette Interchange is a major freeway interchange in downtown Milwaukee, Wisconsin, located near Marquette University where Interstate 43 (I-43, North–South Freeway), I-94 (North–South Freeway and East–West Freeway), and I-794 (Lake Freeway) meet. Originally built in the 1960s, the interchange underwent a total rebuild between 2004 and 2008, and was officially opened on August 19, 2008, after what was at the time the largest construction project in state history. During the early 2000s, U.S. Highway 41 (US 41) had followed I-94 through the interchange. This had changed when I-41 was designated in the Milwaukee area. US 41 now follows I-41 through the Zoo Interchange instead.

== History ==
The history of the Marquette Interchange, originally called the Central Interchange, stretches back more than half a century. The idea of a north–south freeway with an interchange in downtown Milwaukee was first proposed in 1952 for an area south and east of Marquette University. An artist's sketch in a local newspaper in October 1952 provided a first glimpse of the future.

The following year, the Milwaukee County Expressway Commission was created by state law to plan, design, construct and maintain a freeway system in Milwaukee County. Land acquisition soon began. In 1955, the Milwaukee County Board adopted A General Plan of Expressways for Milwaukee County, which included a downtown interchange near the present location of the Marquette Interchange.

All of this activity in Milwaukee was in no way unique. Many cities across the United States were drawing up plans for new freeways during the mid-1950s. Nationally, there were big plans, too. In 1956, President Dwight D. Eisenhower signed the Federal Aid Highway Act of 1956, creating the United States' modern Interstate Highway System.

Preliminary design on the Marquette Interchange began in 1956, and final design began in 1960. In 1964, construction began, and so did a difficult balancing act. For the next 4 1/2 years, traffic flow on city streets had to be maintained while new expressways and the new interchange were built in their midst. Bypasses and temporary street connections were used extensively to route heavy volumes of traffic around construction areas. Between 1964 and 1968, 21 construction contracts totaling over $33 million were awarded. The Marquette Interchange was dedicated and opened to traffic on December 23, 1968.

The interchange was, and still is in its rebuilt form, one of downtown Milwaukee's most prominent features. The Marquette Interchange has no affiliation with Marquette University, to which it is adjacent. Marquette University officials like to joke about how the university receives complaints from disgruntled motorists who erroneously believe the interchange is owned by the university.

By the 2000s, the interchange was experiencing severe deterioration and traffic problems due to major design flaws, including poorly designed left exits and vehicles having to weave across travel lanes to reach exit ramps, causing accidents and bottlenecks.

=== The new interchange ===
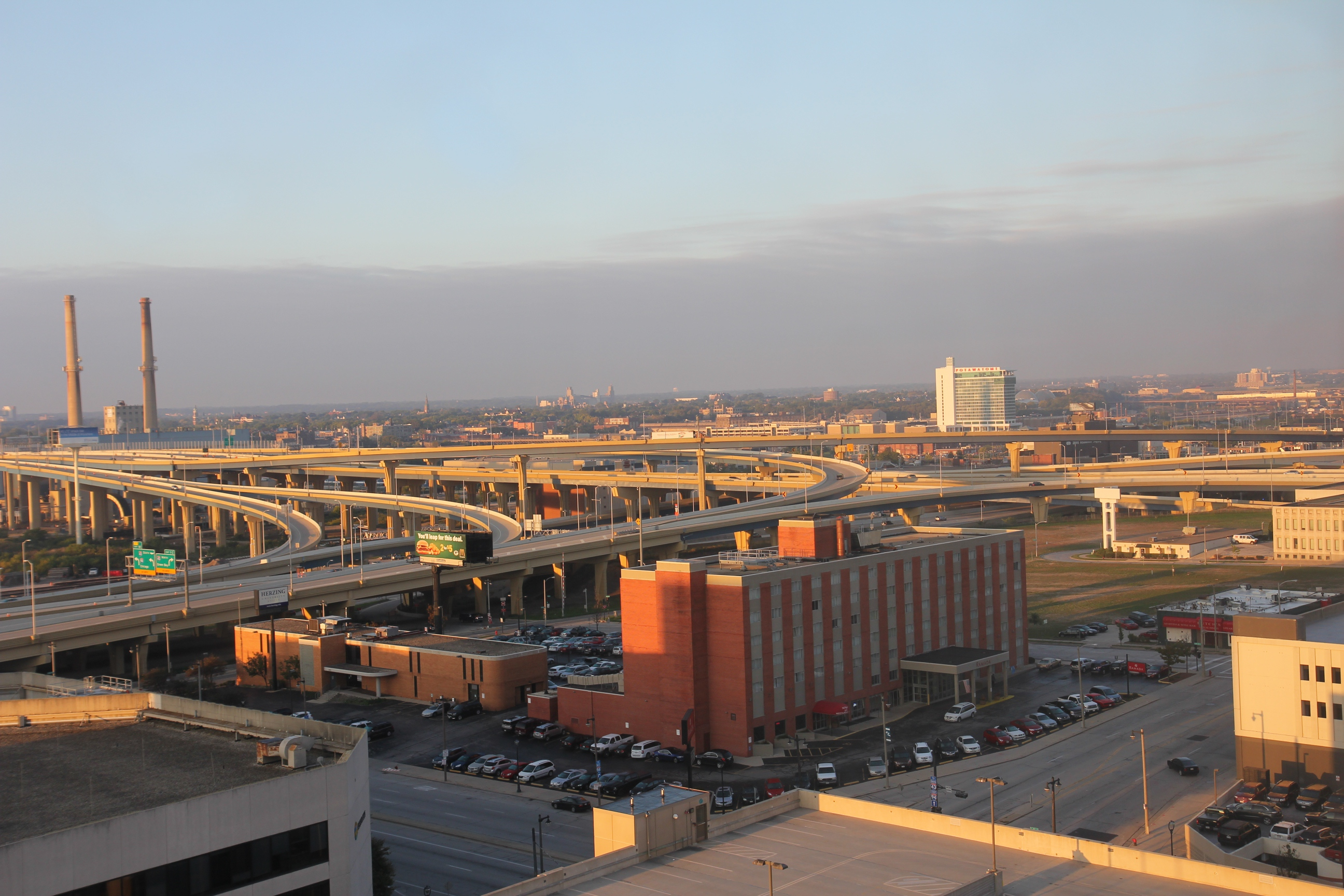
Interchange in 2015

The junction underwent a complete reconstruction dubbed the Marquette Interchange Project between 2004 and 2008, and was officially opened on August 19, 2008, several weeks ahead of schedule. The construction came in at $190 million below its $1 billion budget. The project involved 46 cranes and more than 4,000 workers in what was at the time the largest construction project in state history.

The project rebuilt the viaduct section of I-794 between the interchange and the Milwaukee River, I-43 from the interchange to North Avenue (including the bridges carrying city streets that spanned the freeway), the Hillside Interchange that connected I-43 to Highway 145, and I-94 from the interchange to 26th Street (including rebuilding the north end of the 16th Street Viaduct, officially known as the James E. Groppi Unity Bridge). The project also demolished the Milwaukee County Courthouse Annex parking structure that stood over the northbound lanes of I-43 just north of the interchange. The interchange reconstruction also re-configured the stubbed Park Freeway to an arterial street design, with the freed up land eventually leading to the redevelopment of the Haymarket neighborhood, and the construction of the Fiserv Forum arena.

The new Marquette Interchange occupies the same approximately 75 acres of downtown land as the old interchange system, with some adjustments. Design features include:

- Two lane ramps in all directions
- More gradual curves on ramps, with longer sight distances
- More distance between ramps, to eliminate traffic conflicts from lane changes, which was accommodated by rebuilding the roads a half-mile from the interchange
- Elimination of all left-hand entrances and exits
- Design features allow for future expansion in all directions to eight lanes

== See also ==
- Eclipse Park
