= Stadium Freeway =

Stadium Freeway may refer to:

- Stadium Freeway (Oregon), Interstate 405 in Portland, Oregon
- Stadium Freeway (Wisconsin), part of Wisconsin Highway 175 in Milwaukee, Wisconsin
