= Wisconsin Highway 145 =

State Highway in Wisconsin

State Trunk Highway 145
- WIS 145 highlighted in red

Route information
- Maintained by WisDOT
- Length: 24.7 mi (39.8 km)

Major junctions
- South end: US 18 in Milwaukee
- I-43 in Milwaukee; I-41 / US 45 / WIS 100 in Milwaukee; I-41 / US 41 in Richfield
- North end: WIS 175 in Richfield

Location
- Country: United States
- State: Wisconsin
- Counties: Milwaukee, Waukesha, Washington

Highway system
- Wisconsin State Trunk Highway System; Interstate; US; State; Scenic; Rustic
← WIS 144	→ WIS 146

State Trunk Highway 145 (STH-145, commonly known as Highway 145 or WIS 145) is a 24.7-mile (39.8 km) state highway in Milwaukee, Waukesha, and Washington counties in Wisconsin, United States, that connects the northwest suburbs of Milwaukee with the city's downtown. For much of its route, the highway is known as Fond du Lac Avenue.

== Route description ==
Up until the fall of 2009, WIS 145's northern terminus was at the freeway interchange with US Highway 41 (US 41) in Richfield. A project involving the construction of five roundabouts in a less than one mile span has truncated the highway's northern terminus to the freeway interchange with US 45, with the stretch of roundabouts between US 41 and US 45 now designated as County Trunk Highway FD (CTH-FD). WIS 145 travels generally southeast through Germantown as a secondary highway. Upon reaching Menomonee Falls, the road expands into a four-lane boulevard for just over one mile (1.6 km), straddling the Waukesha–Milwaukee county line before intersecting with US 41/US 45 again.

At this point, the road heads into the city limits of Milwaukee and becomes a freeway, officially known as the Fond du Lac Freeway, though this term is rarely used locally. Although it was originally planned to continue into the heart of downtown, the freeway ends after just under five miles (8.0 km) at which point it intersects with 68th Street and Hampton Avenue. WIS 145 continues as Fond du Lac Avenue into downtown. It is a four-lane boulevard until Burleigh Street, at which point it becomes a four-lane urban arterial. It becomes a four-lane boulevard again at 20th Street until its intersection with Sixth Street. A major interchange at Interstate 43 (I-43) is just past the intersection with Walnut Street. WIS 145 turns south onto Sixth Street before terminating at the intersection with US 18 (Wells Street), adjacent to the Wisconsin Center.

== History ==
WIS 145 was once also a part of the Park East Freeway, a short spur running east from its intersection with I-43, over the Milwaukee River before terminating at Broadway and Milwaukee Street at East Knapp Street. The freeway was demolished between 2002 and 2003, with the replacement surface streets not complete until 2006.

=== Fond du Lac Freeway extension ===
Originally, the freeway portion of WIS 145 was to extend further southeast and there was to be a major interchange located near the intersection of W. Lisbon Road and W. North Avenue, connecting the Fond du Lac with the proposed extension of the Stadium Freeway and the proposed Bay Freeway. This was never built.

== Major intersections ==
County	Location	mi	km	Exit	Destinations	Notes
Milwaukee	Milwaukee	0.0	0.0		US 18	Southern terminus
Milwaukee	Milwaukee	0.9	1.4		I-43	Exit 72A on I-43
Milwaukee	Milwaukee	1.6	2.6		WIS 57 south (N. 17th Street)	Southeastern end of WIS 57 concurrency
Milwaukee	Milwaukee	1.8	2.9		WIS 57 north (N. 20th Street)	Northwestern end of WIS 57 concurrency
Milwaukee	Milwaukee	4.7	7.6		WIS 190 (W. Capitol Drive)	
Milwaukee	Milwaukee	6.3	10.1		Fond du Lac Avenue	Southeastern end of freeway
Milwaukee	Milwaukee	6.7	10.8	7A	Grantosa Avenue, Villard Avenue	Southbound exit and northbound entrance only
Milwaukee	Milwaukee	7.0	11.3	7B	WIS 181 (76th Street)	
Milwaukee	Milwaukee	7.4	11.9	8	Silver Spring Drive	Northbound exit to eastbound only; southbound exit to westbound only
Milwaukee	Milwaukee	8.4	13.5	9	91st Street	
Milwaukee	Milwaukee	9.2	14.8	10A	Green Tree Road, 102nd Street	Southbound entrance and northbound exit only
Milwaukee	Milwaukee	9.7	15.6	10B	107th Street, Good Hope Road, Fond du Lac Ave	Signed for Good Hope Road northbound only; signed for Fond du Lac Avenue southbound only
Milwaukee	Milwaukee	10	16	10C	Park Place	
Milwaukee	Milwaukee	11.3	18.2		I-41 / US 45 / WIS 100	Exit 47B on US 41/US 45/WIS 100
Waukesha	Menomonee Falls	12.7	20.4		WIS 100 (Main Street)	
Washington	Village of Germantown	16.5	26.6		WIS 167 east (Mequon Road)	Eastern end of WIS 167 concurrency
Washington	Village of Germantown	16.8	27.0		WIS 167 west (Mequon Road)	Western end of WIS 167 concurrency
Washington	Richfield	23.2	37.3		US 45	Exit 60 on US 45
Washington	Richfield	23.7	38.1		I-41 / US 41	Exit 60 on US 41
Washington	Richfield	24.7	39.8		WIS 175	Northern terminus
1.000 mi = 1.609 km; 1.000 km = 0.621 mi: Concurrency terminus; Incomplete access
