= Wisconsin Highway 175 =

State highway in Wisconsin, United States

State Trunk Highway 175
- WIS 175 highlighted in red

Route information
- Maintained by WisDOT
- Length: 51.4 mi (82.7 km)

Major junctions
- South end: WIS 59 in West Milwaukee
- I-94 in Milwaukee; US 18 in Milwaukee; I-41 / US 41 / US 45 / WIS 100 in Milwaukee
- North end: US 151 in Fond du Lac

Location
- Country: United States
- State: Wisconsin
- Counties: Milwaukee, Waukesha, Washington, Dodge, Fond du Lac

Highway system
- Wisconsin State Trunk Highway System; Interstate; US; State; Scenic; Rustic
← WIS 174	→ WIS 176

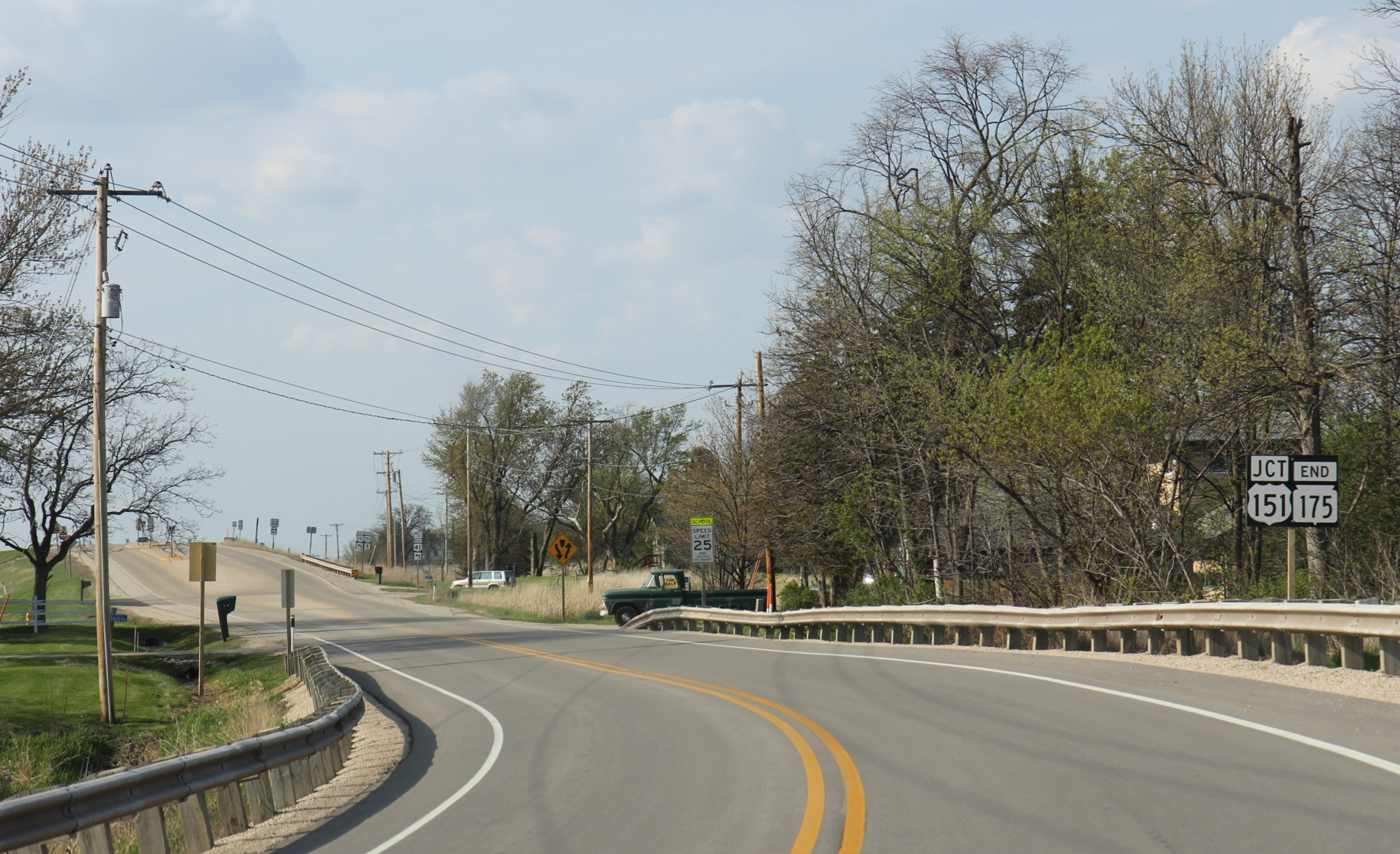
Former northern terminus

State Trunk Highway 175 (often called Highway 175, STH-175 or WIS 175) is a state highway in the US state of Wisconsin. It runs north–south in central Wisconsin from West Milwaukee to just south of Fond du Lac.

The highway follows the former route of U.S. Highway 41 (US 41) before US 41's current route was created between 1953 and 1955. Portions of the highway were part of the Yellowstone Trail. North Fond du Lac created a park dedicated to the trail, which was the first transcontinental automobile highway through the upper tier of states in the United States.

== History ==
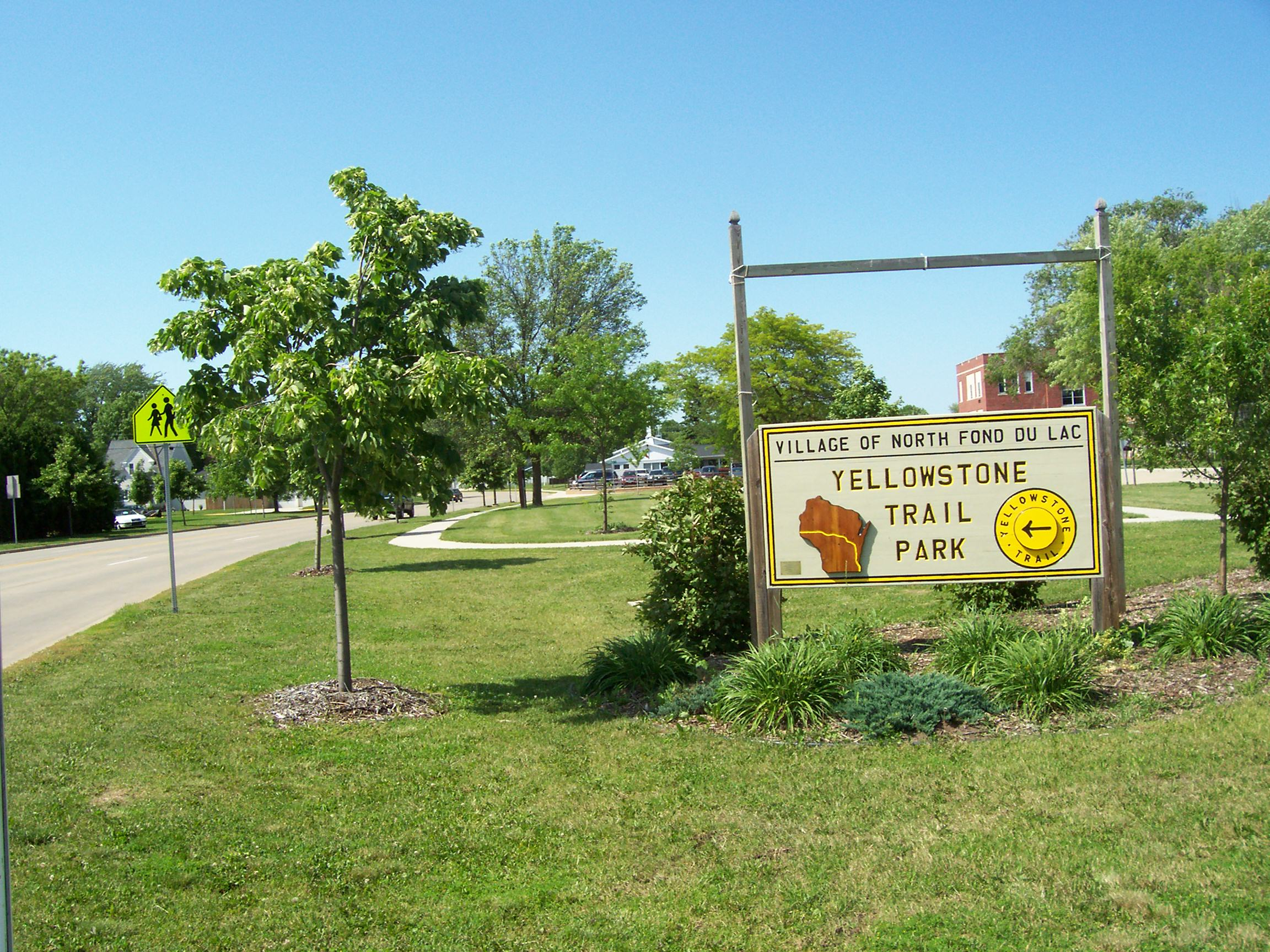
Commemorative sign along former WIS 175 at Yellowstone Trail Park in North Fond du Lac

The highway was shortened by 17.1 miles (27.5 km) on January 1, 2007. The northern terminus was moved from US 45 near Oshkosh to its present location near Fond du Lac. The portion in Winnebago County became County Trunk Highway R (CTH-R), and the portion in Fond du Lac County (including through the Van Dyne, North Fond du Lac, and Fond du Lac communities) became CTH-RP.

Numerous segments of the highway are marked for changing to local control, including segments in Washington County. It formerly went into the city of Fond du Lac before the 2010s, when the city's highway designations changed with the completion of the US 151 bypass.

Beginning in May 2015, US 41 south of Howard underwent conversion to Interstate 41 (I-41) and was rerouted to follow an existing freeway alignment in Milwaukee County. Beginning the following month, WIS 175 signs began replacing US 41 signs in the Milwaukee area, where the designation was extended beyond I-94 along the Stadium Freeway, also replacing WIS 341 between the Stadium Interchange and WIS 59.

In 2022, the Wisconsin Department of Transportation began exploring reconstructing Highway 175 in Milwaukee between North Avenue and Vliet Street in the Washington Heights neighborhood of Milwaukee. In 2016, Urban Milwaukee contributor John O'Neill wrote an article suggesting partial removal of the highway in order to improve pedestrian safety.

== Major intersections ==
County	Location	mi	km	Exit	Destinations	Notes
Milwaukee	West Milwaukee				WIS 59 (National Avenue)	Southern terminus; southern end of freeway
Milwaukee	Milwaukee			—	American Family Field / Canal Street	
Milwaukee	Milwaukee			38	I-94 – Milwaukee, Madison	Only numbered southbound
Milwaukee	Milwaukee			—	US 18	
Milwaukee	Milwaukee			—	State Street / Vliet Street	
Milwaukee	Milwaukee			—	Washington Boulevard	Northbound exit only
Milwaukee	Milwaukee			—	Lloyd Street	No southbound exit
Milwaukee	Milwaukee				Lisbon Avenue	Northern end of freeway
Milwaukee	Milwaukee				WIS 190	
Milwaukee	Milwaukee				WIS 181	
Milwaukee	Milwaukee				WIS 181	
Milwaukee	Milwaukee			—	I-41 / US 41 / US 45 / WIS 100 / Metro Auto Mall	No access to southbound I-41 from northbound WIS 175 or northbound I-41 from southbound WIS 175; Metro Auto Mall northbound exit only
Waukesha	No major junctions					
Washington	Richfield				WIS 167	Roundabout
Washington	Richfield				WIS 145	Northern terminus of WIS 145
Washington	Town of Polk				To WIS 164	Grade-separated
Washington	Slinger				WIS 60 – Hartford, Grafton	
Washington	Slinger				WIS 144 north	Southern terminus of WIS 144
Washington	Town of Hartford				WIS 83 south – Hartford	Northern terminus of WIS 83
Washington	Addison				WIS 33 – Horicon, Allenton	
Dodge	Theresa				WIS 28 west / WIS 67 south – Mayville	Southern end of WIS 28/WIS 67 concurrency
Dodge	Town of Theresa				WIS 28 east – Kewaskum	Northern end of WIS 28 concurrency
Dodge	Lomira				WIS 67 north	Northern end of WIS 67 concurrency
Dodge	Town of Lomira				WIS 49 – Brownsville	
Fond du Lac	Fond du Lac				US 151	Northern terminus
1.000 mi = 1.609 km; 1.000 km = 0.621 mi: Concurrency terminus; Incomplete access
