= County Trunk Highways (Wisconsin) =

- Standard Wisconsin county trunk highway shields

Highway names
- Interstates: Interstate X (I-X)
- US Highways: U.S. Highway X (US X)
- State: (State Trunk) Highway X (STH-X or WIS X)
- County: (County Trunk) Highway X (CTH-X)

System links
- County Trunk Highways

County trunk highways (also called County Highway, CTH; for national mapping software/app consistency, CR, or County Road are also used) are highways maintained at the county level or below in the U.S. state of Wisconsin. Every county maintains its own county trunk highway system.

== Description ==
Wisconsin uses letters as designations for its county roads. Highways may be labeled with a single letter (CTH-H), double letter (CTH-LL or CTH-AB) or triple letter (CTH-BBB). Roads are usually named sequentially, although the letter designation may stand for the initials of a road, a geographical feature, a political division (such as CTH-KR along the Kenosha–Racine county line), or in honor of a person. Two county highways running concurrently on the same roadway often take on both letters on that portion; for instance two highways designated CTH-J and CTH-L would take the designation CTH-JL on a certain route before their divergence down the road, returning to their individual route designations thereafter.

Designations may be repeated within a single county, depending on the size and population of the county. Designations may continue over a county line. Usually the letter designation remains the same when the route is a former state highway that has been decommissioned and turned over to county control. There are no east–west or north–south pattern restrictions on which letters can be used for a road, and they can be looped around counties and metropolitan areas. County highways can also run concurrently with state and U.S. Highways (the most prominent for the latter being a portion of CTH-M in Dane County that overlaps the Madison Beltline); there are no current concurrencies with county highways and Interstates.

For the most part, all county highway systems in the state are surfaced asphalt or concrete, though a few lightly traveled historic roads (often designated by the Wisconsin Department of Transportation as Rustic Roads) are gravel roads.

== History ==
County trunk highways first came into being in 1921. The first county highways were independent of the state's trunk highway system and lacked state legislative approval. By 1924, every county in Wisconsin had set up its own county highway system, with the state authorizing county highways in 1925.
