= Penzeys Spices =

American spice retailer

Penzeys, Ltd.
- Type: Private
- Founded: 1986 (40 years ago)
- Founder: William Penzey Sr.
- Headquarters: Wauwatosa, Wisconsin, U.S.
- Number of locations: 49
- Services: Spice retailer
- Owner: William T. Penzey Jr.
- Website: www.penzeys.com

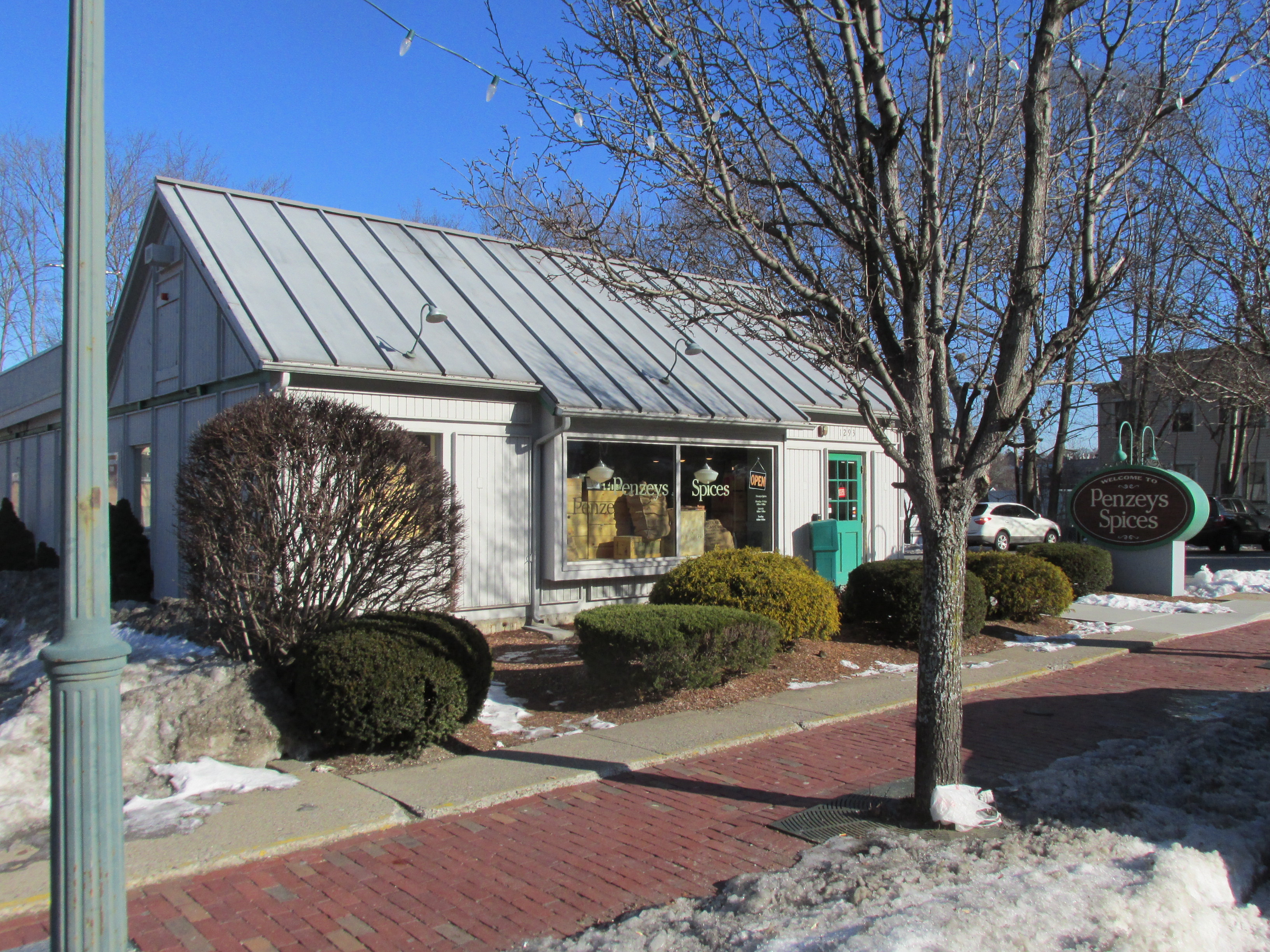
Penzeys store in Arlington, Massachusetts

Penzeys Spices is a retailer of spices in the United States. It operates retail outlets as well as mail order and online shopping. The company is headquartered in Wauwatosa, Wisconsin, and has 600,000 catalog customers in 2007.

== History ==
In 1957, William Penzey Sr. and Ruth Ann Penzey opened a coffee and spice business in Milwaukee, Wisconsin, which came to be called The Spice House. Their son, William Penzey Jr. (Bill), began working in the business as a youth. Over time, The Spice House focused on selling spices.

In 1986, at the age of 22, Bill launched a catalog business of his own. The business grew steadily, and in 1994, Penzeys opened its first retail store. By 2013, 69 Penzeys stores were open throughout North America.

In 2012, Penzeys had 67 retail locations in 29 states. In March 2020, it announced closures due to the COVID-19 pandemic. By June 2021, the number of Penzeys locations had contracted to 53.

== Political involvement ==
Penzeys Spices is known for promoting a liberal perspective and has an "About Republicans" page on the company website that describes the party's politics as "nonsense." The company also uses political movements to offer specials on spices.

On January 14, 2022, CEO Bill Penzey sent out an email newsletter announcing that he would be renaming the extended Martin Luther King Jr. Day sale weekend to "Republicans are racist weekend", with the reasons given including alleged voter suppression in red states and their response to the George Floyd protests. Penzey was widely criticized for the email, with 40,000 people unsubscribing from their newsletter. Penzey, however, stated that 30,000 new people had signed up to the newsletter.

Penzey made a similar statement in an email sent out on the first anniversary of the January 6 US Capitol attack, calling Republicans the "#1 threat to this country". Penzey had first begun insulting President Trump in 2018.

In 2024, presidential candidate Kamala Harris visited the Pittsburgh location, which garnered negative attention from Republicans.

== Bibliography ==
- Penzey, Bill; Penzeys One Staff (2008). How We Became One. Kitchen Table Communications, 2008.
