= Interstate 41 =

Interstate Highway in eastern Wisconsin

Interstate 41
- I-41 highlighted in red

Route information
- Maintained by WisDOT and IDOT
- Length: 175.00 mi (281.64 km)
- Existed: April 7, 2015–present
- History: Approved for designation in 2012
- NHS: Entire route

Major junctions
- South end: I-94 Toll / US 41 in Russell, IL
- I-43 / I-894 in Milwaukee, WI; US 45 in Milwaukee, WI; I-94 in Milwaukee, WI; US 18 in Milwaukee, WI; US 151 in Fond du Lac, WI; US 45 in Oshkosh, WI; US 10 / WIS 441 in Fox Crossing, WI; US 141 in Green Bay, WI
- North end: I-43 / US 41 / US 141 in Howard, WI

Location
- Country: United States
- States: Illinois, Wisconsin
- Counties: IL: Lake; WI: Kenosha, Racine, Milwaukee, Waukesha, Washington, Dodge, Fond du Lac, Winnebago, Outagamie, Brown

Highway system
- Interstate Highway System; Main; Auxiliary; Suffixed; Business; Future
- Illinois State Highway System; Interstate; US; State; Tollways; Scenic
- Wisconsin State Trunk Highway System; Interstate; US; State; Scenic; Rustic
← IL 40	IL	→ US 41
← WIS 40	WI	→ US 41

Interstate 41 (I-41) is a 175.00-mile-long (281.64 km) north–south Interstate Highway connecting the interchange of I-94 and U.S. Route 41 (US 41), located about a mile (1.6 km) south of the Wisconsin–Illinois state line at the end of the Tri-State Tollway in metropolitan Chicago, to an interchange with I-43 in metropolitan Green Bay, Wisconsin. The designation travels concurrently with US 41 for its entire length, as well as portions of I-894, US 45, I-43, and sections of I-94 in Wisconsin and Illinois. The route was officially added to the Interstate Highway System on April 7, 2015, and connects Milwaukee and Green Bay with the Fox Cities.

== Route description ==
I-41 begins at the I-94/US 41 interchange in Russell, Illinois, located about a mile (1.6 km) south of the Wisconsin–Illinois border at the end of the Tri-State Tollway. The highway continues north concurrently with I-94 as part of the North-South Freeway to the Mitchell Interchange in Milwaukee, turns west to run concurrently with I-894 and I-43 as the Airport Freeway to the Hale Interchange (forming a brief wrong-way concurrency with I-43), and turns north to run concurrently as the Zoo Freeway with I-894 and US 45 to the Zoo Interchange, with the US 45 concurrency continuing until the I-41/US 41/US 45 split near Richfield. The Interstate roughly parallels I-43, which runs north–south along Lake Michigan from Milwaukee to Green Bay. I-41 runs through the Fox Valley (including the cities of Fond du Lac, Oshkosh, and Appleton, along with the Fox Cities). At Appleton, I-41 intersects US 10 and State Trunk Highway 441 (WIS 441), the latter of which is a freeway that forms a beltway around Appleton by running around the south and east side of the city and back to I-41. Further north, I-41 intersects WIS 172 on the south side of Green Bay, before running along the city's west side to its end at the I-43 interchange. The Interstate is 175.00 miles (281.64 km) long and located almost entirely within the state of Wisconsin and is completely concurrent with a slightly adjusted alignment of US 41 to its termination in Green Bay.

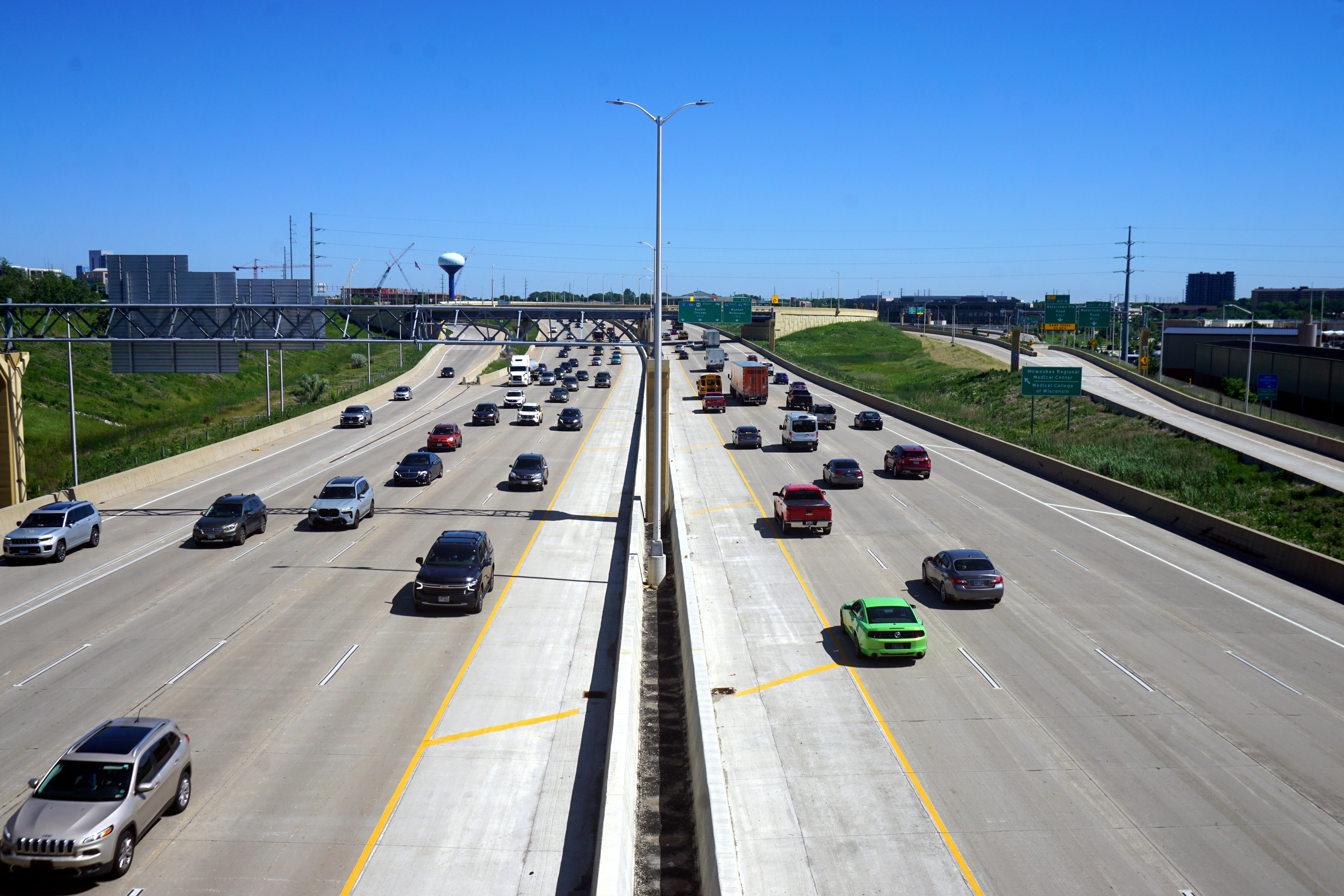
I-41 in Wauwatosa

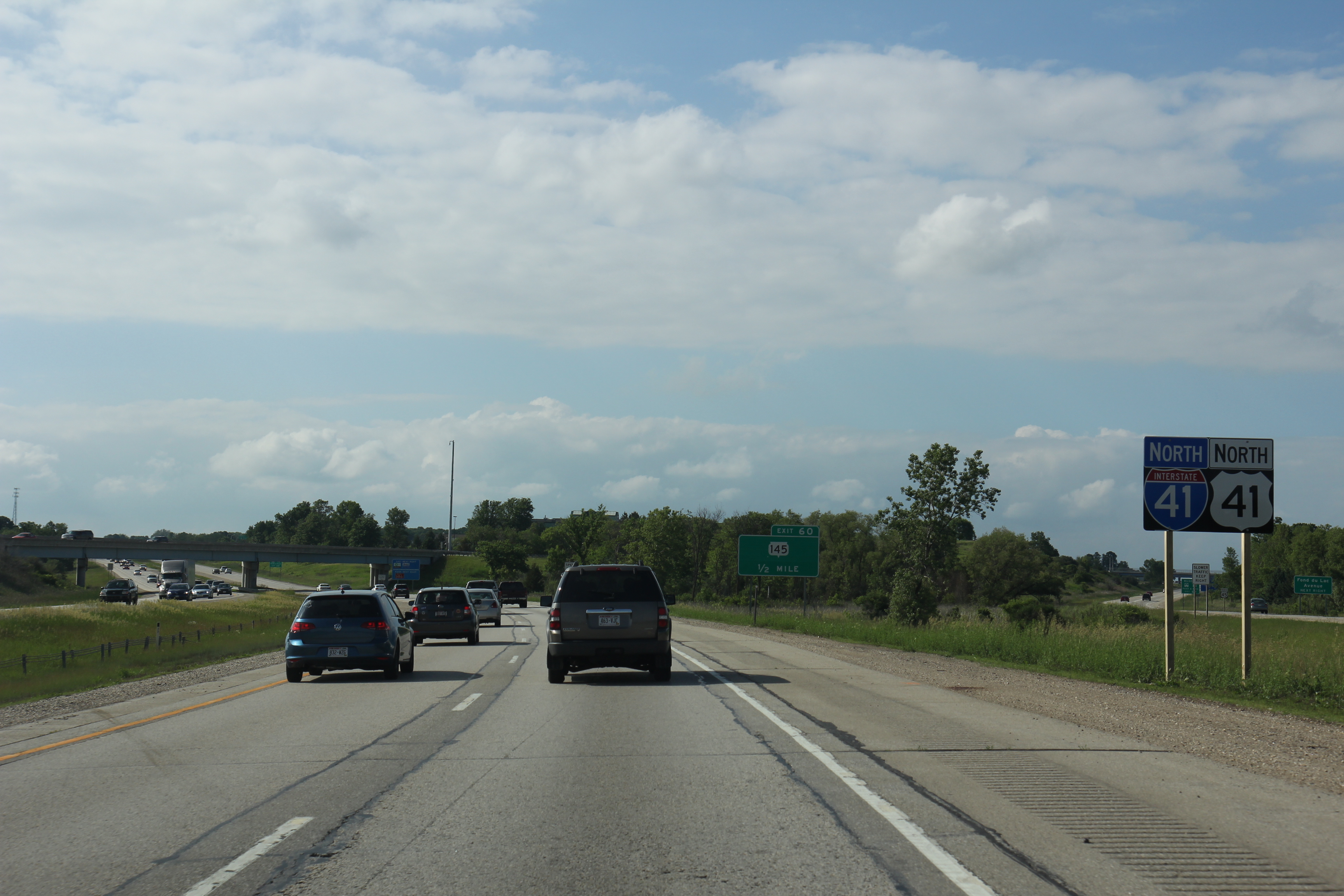
Newly installed I-41/US 41 sign south of WIS 145 near Richfield from June 2015

== History ==
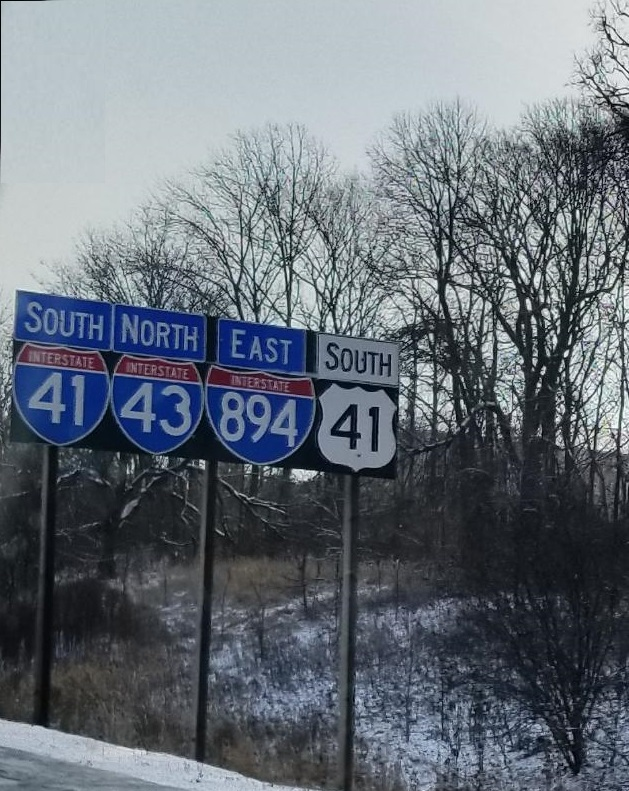
Markers for I-41, I-43, and I-894 on the Airport Freeway, the southern bypass of Milwaukee; this is one of three instances of a wrong-way concurrency in the United States involving two Interstate highways. It is also one of only three places in the United States where three Interstate Highways share the same roadway.

The freeway portion of US 41 and US 45 from Milwaukee through the Fox Valley to Green Bay was proposed and designated as an Interstate Highway as part of the 2005 highway funding bill (Safe, Accountable, Flexible, Efficient Transportation Equity Act: A Legacy for Users).

In the initial language of the bill, the route was designated Interstate 41, which correlates with the U.S. Highway it parallels and also complies with the Interstate naming guidelines through the American Association of State Highway and Transportation Officials (AASHTO). The final bill omitted the I-41 designation. In 2009, Green Bay officials began a campaign to have US 41 designated as a northern extension of I-55 from its current termination in Chicago, with the alternative being designated as a spur of I-43. At the spring meeting of the Special Committee on U.S. Route Numbers of AASHTO on May 18, 2012, the I-55 designation was discussed by the committee. Coordination would have been required with the Federal Highway Administration (FHWA) and the Illinois Department of Transportation (IDOT) on the I-55 designation.

However, IDOT officials were not interested in signing an extension of I-55 from its Chicago terminus to the state line. Therefore, the Wisconsin Department of Transportation (WisDOT) decided to seek a different designation not requiring the cooperation of their Illinois counterparts. Four designations were proposed by WisDOT and put up for public review: two new primary designations (I-41 and I-47) and two auxiliary designations (I-594 and I-643). At the end of October 2012, WisDOT submitted I-41 to AASHTO for consideration at their fall Special Committee meeting, where it was conditionally approved on November 16, 2012, pending FHWA concurrence. Official approval of I-41 then hinged on weight limit exceptions being approved for the route, which initially passed the United States House of Representatives as H.R. 4745 and awaited a United States Senate vote as S. 2438, but there were later passed in a different bill (H.R. 83) on December 16, 2014. On April 9, 2015, Wisconsin Governor Scott Walker announced that the FHWA had approved I-41 as part of the Interstate Highway System. According to WisDOT, the approval came two days earlier.

WisDOT replaced or modified 3,500 signs before and near September 2015 after coordination with IDOT and the FHWA (signs erected in 2014 and into 2015 before approval of the designation had the I-41 shield obscured until approval). As of October 10, 2025, many parts of the highway have been rebuilt, with some projects happening as of October 2025. Shoulders have been or slated to be rebuilt as older parts of the highway are mostly rebuilt. The redesignation to Interstate status also makes the route subject to the Highway Beautification Act, meaning current advertising billboards along the Milwaukee-to-Green Bay portion of the road can no longer be upgraded or enlarged nor can new signs be added.

In the 2020s, the entire I-41 corridor was designated as an Alternative Fuel Corridor for electric vehicles.

== Future ==
Beginning in early 2024, WisDOT plans to start several projects to reconstruct portions of I-41 in the Appleton/Fox Cities metro area between Neenah and De Pere. The projects will include widening the Interstate from two to three lanes in each direction on a 23-mile-long (37 km) stretch between Appleton and De Pere, upgrading interchanges, reconstructing bridges, and repaving sections of the freeway, along with the new South Bridge Connector project adding a new Fox River span south of De Pere with an I-41 interchange. These projects are expected to be completed by 2030.

== Exit list ==
County	Location	mi	km	Exit	Destinations	Notes
Lake	Newport Township	0.00	0.00	1B	I-94 Toll east (Tri-State Tollway) – Chicago, Indiana US 41 south (Skokie Highway) – Waukegan	Southern end of I-94/US 41 concurrency; southbound entrance only from Frontage Road, acts as the entrance ramp from Russell Road to I-94 east
Lake	Newport Township	0.76	1.22	1A	CR A1 (Russell Road)	Signed as exit 1 northbound; exit numbers based on I-94's mile markers
		0.90 0.00	1.45 0.00	Illinois–Wisconsin state line		
Kenosha	Pleasant Prairie	2.04	3.28	347	WIS 165 / CTH-Q (Lakeview Parkway)	
Kenosha	Pleasant Prairie	3.43	5.52	345	CTH-C (Wilmot Road)	
Kenosha	Kenosha	5.07	8.16	344	WIS 50 (75th Street) – Kenosha, Lake Geneva	To 71st Street
Kenosha	Somers	6.59	10.61	342	WIS 158 (52nd Street) – Kenosha	Kenosha Regional Airport
Kenosha	Somers	8.35	13.44	340	WIS 142 (Burlington Road) / CTH-S – Burlington, Kenosha	
Kenosha	Town of Paris	10.07	16.21	339	CTH-E (Somers Road) – Somers	
Racine–Kenosha county line	Mount Pleasant–Paris village/town line	12.08	19.44	337	WIS 195 – Mount Pleasant, Somers	
Racine	Mount Pleasant	13.95	22.45	335	WIS 11 (Durand Avenue) – Burlington, Racine	
Racine	Town of Yorkville	15.96– 16.01	25.69– 25.77	333	WIS 20 (Washington Avenue) – Waterford, Racine	
Racine	Caledonia	19.64	31.61	329	CTH-K (Northwestern Avenue) – Racine, Caledonia	
Racine	Town of Raymond	21.67	34.87	327	CTH-G (5 1/2 Mile Road) – Caledonia	
Racine	Town of Raymond	23.17	37.29	326	Seven Mile Road	Current southern terminus of WIS 241
Racine	Caledonia	24.10	38.79	325	WIS 241 north (27th Street)	Exit permanently closed; northbound exit and southbound entrance
Milwaukee	Oak Creek			324	Elm Road to WIS 241	
Milwaukee	Oak Creek	26.39	42.47	322	WIS 100 (Ryan Road)	
Milwaukee	Oak Creek	28.47	45.82	321	Drexel Avenue	
Milwaukee	Oak Creek	29.41	47.33	320	CTH-BB (Rawson Avenue)	
Milwaukee	Milwaukee	30.38	48.89	319	CTH-ZZ (College Avenue)	
Milwaukee	Milwaukee	31.08	50.02	318	WIS 119 – Milwaukee Mitchell International Airport	
Milwaukee	Milwaukee	32.37	52.09	316	CTH-Y (Layton Avenue) to 27th Street	
Milwaukee	Milwaukee	32.53– 32.69	52.35– 52.61	10; 317	I-94 east (North–South Freeway) – Chicago, Airport I-43 north (North–South Freeway) / I-94 west – Milwaukee I-894 west (Airport Freeway)	Northern end of I-94 concurrency; eastern end of I-43 wrong-way concurrency; eastern end of I-894 concurrency; Mitchell Interchange
Milwaukee	Milwaukee	33.60	54.07	9	WIS 241 – South 27th Street	No access is allowed from I-94 west or to I-94 east; exit numbers based on I-894's mile markers
Milwaukee	Greenfield	34.64	55.75	8	WIS 36 – Loomis Road	
Milwaukee	Greenfield	35.64	57.36	7	South 60th Street	
Milwaukee	Greenfield	36.66	59.00	5B	South 76th Street	Northbound exit and southbound entrance
Milwaukee	Greenfield	36.66– 37.14	59.00– 59.77	5A	South 76th Street, South 84th Street	Southbound exit and northbound entrance
Milwaukee	Greenfield	36.86	59.32	5A	WIS 24 west – Forest Home Avenue	Northbound exit and southbound entrance
Milwaukee	Milwaukee	38.06	61.25	4	I-43 south (Rock Freeway) / US 45 south – Beloit, Chicago	Western end of I-43 concurrency; southern end of the US 45 concurrency; Hale Interchange
Milwaukee	Greenfield	39.32	63.28	3	CTH-T (Beloit Road)	
Milwaukee	Greenfield	39.93	64.26	2B	Oklahoma Avenue	Southbound exit and northbound entrance
Milwaukee	West Allis	40.67	65.45	2A	National Avenue	Southbound exit to westbound National Avenue only
Milwaukee	West Allis	40.93	65.87	1E	Lincoln Avenue	Southbound exit and northbound entrance
Milwaukee	West Allis	41.89	67.42	1D	WIS 59 – Greenfield Avenue	
Milwaukee	Milwaukee	42.61	68.57	1; 38	I-94 (East–West Freeway) – Madison, Downtown Milwaukee, Chicago I-894 east (Zoo Freeway)	Western end of I-894 concurrency; signed as exits 1A (east) and 1B (west) northbound and exits 38A (west) and 38B (east) southbound; Zoo Interchange
Milwaukee	Wauwatosa	43.36– 43.60	69.78– 70.17	39	US 18 (Bluemound Road) / Wisconsin Avenue	Northbound exit is not signed for Wisconsin Avenue; exit numbers based on US 45's mile markers
Milwaukee	Wauwatosa	44.14– 44.56	71.04– 71.71	40	Watertown Plank Road, Swan Boulevard	Southbound exit not signed for Swan Boulevard
Milwaukee	Wauwatosa	44.94	72.32	42A	WIS 100 north (Mayfair Road) / North Avenue east	Southbound exit not signed for WIS 100
Milwaukee	Wauwatosa	45.54	73.29	42B	North Avenue west	
Milwaukee	Wauwatosa	46.59	74.98	43	Burleigh Street	
Milwaukee	Wauwatosa	47.59	76.59	44	WIS 190 (Capitol Drive)	Three-level diamond interchange; access roads for the adjacent Harley-Davidson and Penzeys Spices plants are also part of the interchange
Milwaukee	Milwaukee	48.69	78.36	45	CTH-EE (Hampton Avenue)	
Milwaukee	Milwaukee	49.52	79.69	46	CTH-E south (Silver Spring Drive) / WIS 100	Southern end of WIS 100 concurrency
Milwaukee	Milwaukee	51.05	82.16	47	WIS 175 (Appleton Avenue)	
Milwaukee	Milwaukee	51.85	83.44	47B	CTH-PP (Good Hope Road)	Exit numbers based on US 41's mile markers
Milwaukee	Milwaukee	52.15– 52.94	83.93– 85.20	48	WIS 145 (Fond du Lac Freeway/124th Street)	
Waukesha	Menomonee Falls	54.64– 54.77	87.93– 88.14	50	WIS 74 west / WIS 100 east (Main Street)	Northern end of WIS 100 concurrency; signed as exits 50A (east) and 50B (west); WIS 74 designation removed on November 1, 2015
Waukesha	Menomonee Falls	55.45	89.24	51	Pilgrim Road	Signed as exits 51A (north) and 51B (south)
Washington	Germantown	56.68	91.22	52	CTH-Q (County Line Road) / Alt. I-41 / Alt. US 45	I-41 Alternate/US 45 Alternate only signed northbound
Washington	Germantown	58.63	94.36	54	WIS 167 east (Mequon Road) / CTH-Y (Lannon Road)	Southern end of WIS 167 concurrency
Washington	Germantown	61.64	99.20	57	WIS 167 west (Holy Hill Road) / Alt. I-41 / Alt. US 45	Northern end of WIS 167 concurrency; I-41 Alternate/US 45 Alternate only signed southbound
Washington	Richfield	63.27	101.82	59	US 45 north – West Bend	Northern end of US 45 concurrency; northbound exit and southbound entrance
Washington	Richfield	64.37	103.59	60	CTH-FD (Fond du Lac Avenue/Pioneer Road) to WIS 145	Signage reads WIS 145; ramp signage reads CTH-FD TO WIS 145
Washington	Slinger	68.17	109.71	64	WIS 60 (Commerce Blvd.) – Jackson, Slinger, Hartford, Grafton	Signed as exits 64A (east, Jackson) and 64B (west, Slinger, Hartford) northbound
Washington	Town of Polk	70.45	113.38	66	WIS 144 (Kettle Moraine Drive) – West Bend, Slinger	Little Switzerland Ski Area, Slinger Speedway
Washington	Town of Hartford	72.12	116.07	68	CTH-K	
Washington	Town of Addison	76.37	122.91	72	WIS 33 / CTH-W – West Bend, Allenton, Horicon	
Washington	Town of Wayne	79.59	128.09	76	CTH-D	
Dodge	Town of Theresa	85.22	137.15	81	WIS 28 – Mayville, Kewaskum, Theresa	Horicon Marsh State Wildlife Area Southern Section
Dodge	Lomira	89.24	143.62	85	WIS 67 – Lomira, Campbellsport	Kettle Moraine State Forest Northern Unit
Dodge	Town of Lomira	91.29	146.92	87	WIS 49 / CTH-KK – Brownsville, Waupun	Horicon Marsh State Wildlife Area Northern Section
Fond du Lac	Town of Byron	96.10	154.66	92	CTH-B – Oakfield, Eden	
Fond du Lac	Fond du Lac	99.71– 99.72	160.47– 160.48	95	US 45 south / US 151 – Madison, Manitowoc, Waupun, Beaver Dam	Southern end of US 45 concurrency
Fond du Lac	Fond du Lac	101.01	162.56	97	CTH-VVV (Hickory Street)	
Fond du Lac	Fond du Lac	101.84	163.90	98	CTH-D (Military Road)	Former US 151; Fond du Lac County Airport
Fond du Lac	Fond du Lac	103.74	166.95	99	US 45 north / WIS 23 (Johnson Street) – Rosendale, Ripon	Northern end of US 45 concurrency
Fond du Lac	North Fond du Lac	104.24	167.76	101	CTH-OO (Winnebago Street)	
Fond du Lac	Town of Eldorado	110.27	177.46	106	CTH-N – Van Dyne	
Winnebago	Oshkosh	117.47	189.05	113	WIS 26 / CTH-N – Rosendale, Waupun, Pickett	
Winnebago	Oshkosh	120.22	193.48	116	WIS 44 / WIS 91 (South Park Avenue/Ripon Road) – Ripon, Waukau, Berlin	Wittman Regional Airport
Winnebago	Oshkosh	121.64	195.76	117	9th Avenue	
Winnebago	Oshkosh	123.14	198.17	119	WIS 21 (Omro Road, Oshkosh Avenue) – Omro, Redgranite, Wautoma	
Winnebago	Oshkosh	125.05	201.25	120	US 45 (Algoma Boulevard) to US 10 west – New London	To US 10 west not signed southbound
Winnebago	Oshkosh	128.10	206.16	124	WIS 76 (Jackson Street) – Shiocton	
Winnebago	Neenah	133.30	214.53	129	Bell Street, Breezewood Lane	
Winnebago	Neenah	134.67	216.73	131	WIS 114 / CTH-JJ (Winneconne Avenue) – Hilbert, Sherwood	
Winnebago	Neenah	135.61	218.24	132	Main Street, Oak Ridge Road	No entrance ramps
Winnebago	Fox Crossing	136.35	219.43	133	CTH-II (Winchester Road) – Winchester	
Winnebago	Fox Crossing	137.81	221.78	134	US 10 east / WIS 441 north (Tri-County Expressway) – Menasha, Manitowoc	Michael G. Ellis Memorial Interchange
Winnebago	Fox Crossing	137.86	221.86	134	US 10 west – Stevens Point, Waupaca	Michael G. Ellis Memorial Interchange
Winnebago	Fox Crossing	139.62	224.70	136	CTH-BB (Prospect Avenue) – Appleton	
Outagamie	Town of Grand Chute	140.88	226.72	137	WIS 125 (College Avenue) / CTH-CA – Appleton International Airport, Downtown Appleton	
Outagamie	Town of Grand Chute	141.65	227.96	138	WIS 96 (Wisconsin Avenue) – Fremont, Appleton	
Outagamie	Town of Grand Chute	142.71	229.67	139	WIS 15 / CTH-OO (Northland Avenue) to CTH-A – Greenville, Hortonville, Appleton	To CTH-A not signed southbound; Neuroscience Group Field at Fox Cities Stadium
Outagamie	Town of Grand Chute	145.67	234.43	142	WIS 47 (Richmond Street) – Black Creek, Appleton	
Outagamie	Appleton	147.67	237.65	144	CTH-E (Ballard Road)	
Outagamie	Appleton	148.59– 148.61	239.13– 239.16	145	WIS 441 south (Tri-County Expressway) – Kimberly	
Outagamie	Little Chute	151.10	243.17	146	CTH-N (Freedom Road) – Little Chute, Kimberly, Combined Locks	
Outagamie	Kaukauna	152.78	245.88	148	WIS 55 (Delanglade Avenue) – Seymour, Kaukauna, Sherwood, Freedom	
Outagamie	Kaukauna	153.99	247.82	150	CTH-J (Lawe Street/Hyland Avenue) – Kaukauna	
Outagamie	Town of Kaukauna	158.25	254.68	154	CTH-U (County Line Road) – Wrightstown, Hobart	
Brown	Town of Lawrence	161.21	259.44	157	CTH-S (Lawrence Drive) – Freedom, De Pere	
Brown	Town of Lawrence	164	264	160	CTH-EB (Packerland Drive) / CTH-GV (Generations Drive) – De Pere	
Brown	Town of Lawrence	165.87	266.94	161	CTH-F (Scheuring Road) – De Pere	
Brown	Ashwaubenon	167.12	268.95	163A	CTH-G (Main Avenue) – De Pere	
Brown	Ashwaubenon	167.40	269.40	163B	WIS 32 north (Ashland Avenue) – Green Bay	Northbound exit and southbound entrance
Brown	Ashwaubenon	168.39	271.00	164A	CTH-AAA (Oneida Street, Waube Lane)	
Brown	Ashwaubenon	169.36– 169.46	272.56– 272.72	164B	WIS 172 to I-43 / WIS 57 – A. Straubel Airport	To WIS 57 not signed northbound
Brown	Ashwaubenon	171.14	275.42	167	CTH-VK (Lombardi Avenue, Hazelwood Lane) – Green Bay	Lambeau Field
Brown	Green Bay	172.18	277.10	168A	WIS 32 south / WIS 54 (Mason Street) – Seymour, Ashwaubenon	Southern end of WIS 32 concurrency
Brown	Howard	173.17	278.69	168B-C	WIS 29 / WIS 32 north (Shawano Avenue) – Wausau, Shawano, Green Bay	Northern end of WIS 32 concurrency
Brown	Howard	174.75	281.23	170A	US 141 south (Velp Avenue) – Green Bay	Southern end of US 141 concurrency
Brown	Howard	175.16– 175.43	281.89– 282.33	170B	I-43 south / LMCT – Milwaukee, Green Bay US 41 north / US 141 north / LMCT – Marinette, Iron Mountain	Northern end of US 41 concurrency; northern end of US 141 concurrency; northern terminus of I-43; I-41 terminates at northbound entrance ramp from I-43
1.000 mi = 1.609 km; 1.000 km = 0.621 mi: Incomplete access
