= Interstate 43 =

Interstate Highway in eastern Wisconsin

Interstate 43
- I-43 highlighted in red

Route information
- Maintained by WisDOT
- Length: 191.55 mi (308.27 km)
- Existed: 1981–present
- Tourist routes: Lake Michigan Circle Tour
- NHS: Entire route

Major junctions
- South end: I-39 / I-90 in Beloit
- US 14 in Darien; US 12 in Elkhorn; US 45 / WIS 100 in Greenfield; I-41 / I-94 / I-894 / US 41 in Milwaukee; WIS 23 in Sheboygan; US 151 / WIS 42 in Manitowoc; WIS 54 / WIS 57 in Green Bay
- North end: I-41 / US 41 / US 141 in Howard

Location
- Country: United States
- State: Wisconsin
- Counties: Rock, Walworth, Waukesha, Milwaukee, Ozaukee, Sheboygan, Manitowoc, Brown

Highway system
- Interstate Highway System; Main; Auxiliary; Suffixed; Business; Future; Wisconsin State Trunk Highway System; Interstate; US; State; Scenic; Rustic
← WIS 42	→ WIS 43

Interstate 43 (I-43) is a 191.55-mile-long (308.27 km) Interstate Highway located entirely within the US state of Wisconsin, connecting I-39/I-90 in Beloit with Milwaukee and I-41, U.S. Highway 41 (US 41) and US 141 in Green Bay. State Trunk Highway 32 (WIS 32) runs concurrently with I-43 in two sections and I-94, I-894, US 10, US 41, US 45, and WIS 57 overlap I-43 once each. There are no auxiliary or business routes connected to I-43, though an alternate route to direct traffic during road closures is signed along local and state highways from Milwaukee County north into Brown County.

I-43 came about as a result of toll road proposals that included a Milwaukee to Superior corridor that included Hurley, Wausau, and Green Bay. Only the Milwaukee-to-Green Bay section was approved. The route was originally planned to follow an alignment about midway between US 41 and US 141 (the latter paralleled Lake Michigan at the time) along WIS 57. Controversy about this location and use of right-of-way led to the establishment of the current alignment, which follows much of what was the 1950s-era realignment of US 141 from Milwaukee to Sheboygan, and a new alignment from Sheboygan to Green Bay. This section was completed in 1981.

The Beloit-to-Milwaukee segment was developed after two separate proposals for Interstates, one of them between Milwaukee and Beloit and the other between Milwaukee and Janesville. The Milwaukee–Beloit route was chosen, completed in 1976 as WIS 15 and renumbered as I-43 in 1988. To connect the two segments, I-43 was signed concurrently with the east–west segment of I-894 and the north–south portion of I-94 in the greater Milwaukee metropolitan area from the Hale Interchange to the Marquette Interchange, which was completely reconstructed with work being completed in 2008.

== Route description ==
I-43 begins in Rock County as the eastern leg of a T interchange with I-39/I-90 just east of Beloit. The highway becomes WIS 81 west of the interchange. The Beloit-to-Milwaukee segment of I-43 passes mainly through farmland situated on rolling hills, going around urbanized areas except for in the greater Milwaukee area, where the route passes through suburban residential areas with some embedded industrial establishments. The Interstate bypasses Clinton to the north at WIS 140 and passes into Walworth County five miles (8.0 km) east of WIS 140. As of 2007, daily traffic counts for Rock County range from 12,400 to 19,200 with the higher counts closest to Beloit. The interchange with I-39/I-90 accommodates 1,000–5,200 vehicles daily, with the most traffic on ramps connecting southbound I-39/I-90 to westbound WIS 81 and westbound I-43 to southbound I-39/I-90. I-43 passes north of Darien and crosses US 14 at that point, then junctions with WIS 50 south of Delavan. As of 2006, about 14,000–19,200 vehicles use this section daily.

In Elkhorn, I-43 junctions with WIS 67, US 12, and WIS 11. The freeway passes through East Troy about 10 miles (16 km) northeast of Elkhorn and junctions with WIS 20 and WIS 120. It then enters Waukesha County at Mukwonago. I-43 crosses WIS 83 at an interchange just southeast of the village. After about eight miles (13 km), the highway junctions with WIS 164 just north of Big Bend and then enters the city of New Berlin where the freeway has interchanges with South Racine Avenue (CTH-Y) and South Moorland Road (CTH-O). It then turns east to enter Milwaukee County. As of 2006, traffic volumes range from 21,000 around Elkhorn to 35,800 in Waukesha County to 85,000 (2007 figures) at WIS 100.

The Beloit-to-Milwaukee portion (at the Hale Interchange with I-894) was given the name "Rock Freeway" because the freeway traverses Rock County and heads towards the cities in the Rock River valley, including Rockford, Illinois. However, the moniker generally only applies to the portion of the route in Waukesha and Milwaukee counties; freeway names in southeastern Wisconsin media are used interchangeably with Interstate numbers. The freeway is entirely four lanes from Beloit to New Berlin. A six-lane segment begins where US 45 merges on the Interstate.

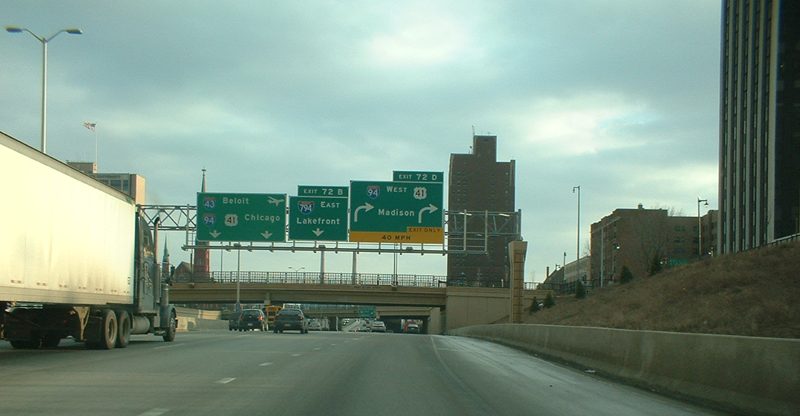
I-43 approaching the Marquette Interchange from the north in Milwaukee

I-43 connects with US 45 south and WIS 100 at South 108th Street. US 45 joins the highway for one mile (1.6 km), then turns northward onto I-894 west and I-41/US 41 south at the Hale Interchange, while I-43 follows I-894 east and I-41/US 41 south along the Airport Freeway into Greenfield, (forming a wrong-way concurrency with I-41) with interchanges with WIS 24, WIS 36, and WIS 241. At the Mitchell Interchange, I-894 ends and I-41/I-94/US 41 continues south while I-43 turns north to follow I-94 northbound, also known as the North–South Freeway, into downtown Milwaukee, where it meets I-794 at the Marquette Interchange. As of 2007, the Airport Freeway carries 107,000–134,000 vehicles per day. The freeway between the Mitchell and Marquette interchanges carried less at that time—97,000 (closer to downtown) to 105,000. The highway passes through mixed urban residential and industrial areas of the greater Milwaukee area, carrying six lanes throughout with the exception of near the Marquette Interchange where eight lanes of traffic exist.

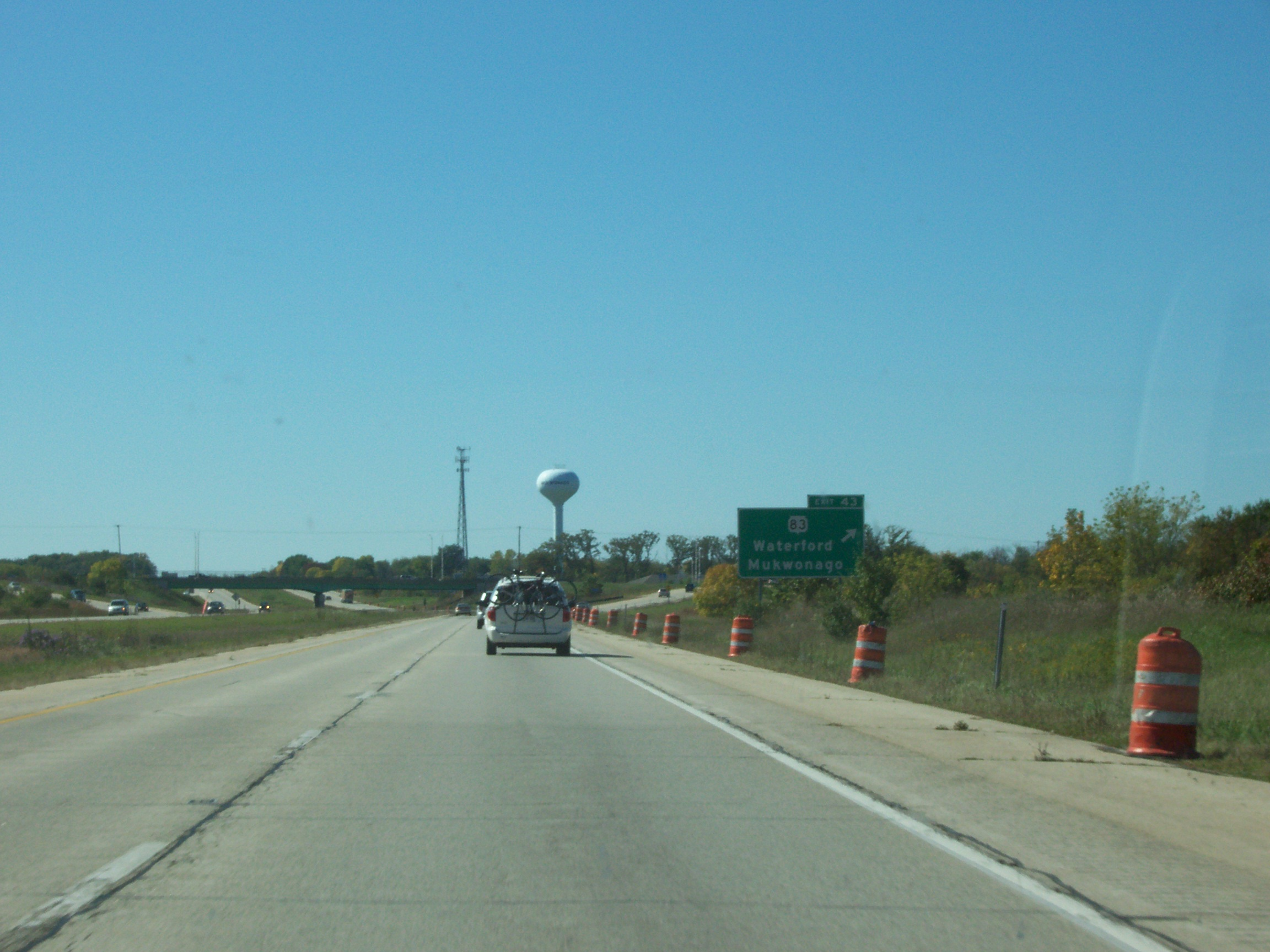
I-43 at WIS 83

I-43 continues north from the Marquette Interchange, while I-94 turns westward. After passing through downtown Milwaukee, just east of Marquette University, it crosses US 18 at Highland Boulevard and crosses WIS 145 at the McKinley Boulevard/Fond du Lac Avenue interchange. Exit 72C's northbound off- and on-ramps in downtown Milwaukee pass underneath the county courthouse via tunnels to Kilbourn Avenue. On the way north out of Milwaukee, the Interstate passes through Glendale, junctioning with WIS 190 (Capitol Drive) and WIS 57 (Green Bay Avenue), and north of Good Hope Road has a grassy median with a cable barrier. WIS 100 and WIS 32 connect at Brown Deer Road and WIS 32 follows the Interstate north into Ozaukee County. Up to 146,000 vehicles used this portion daily in 2007. This count decreased further north, with a count of 78,900 vehicles per day near WIS 100's northern terminus and 69,600 closer to the Ozaukee County border. As it passes through mixed residential and commercial zones north of downtown, the highway carries eight lanes of traffic downtown, six lanes of traffic north of North Avenue to WIS 60 in Grafton, and four lanes of traffic north of WIS 60 all the way to Green Bay.

WIS 57 joins the freeway three miles (4.8 km) north of the county line in Mequon at the junction with WIS 167. The urban residential areas thin out north of this point as a mix of farmland and forest begins to dominate. WIS 60 terminates in Grafton at the Interstate seven miles (11 km) further north and WIS 32 turns off toward Port Washington one mile (1.6 km) north of WIS 60. WIS 33 crosses the route in Saukville. WIS 57 turns north off the freeway, which turns eastward to go around Port Washington to the north. WIS 32 rejoins the freeway on the northside and the two routes follow the Lake Michigan shoreline northeast into Sheboygan County. WIS 32 leaves the freeway at Cedar Grove and the Interstate passes Oostburg to the east and Sheboygan to the west. In Sheboygan, I-43 intersects WIS 28, WIS 23, and WIS 42. I-43 enters Manitowoc County nine miles (14 km) north of Sheboygan. As of 2007, traffic counts in southern Ozaukee County peak at 66,900 vehicles per day—this value generally decreases further north. As of 2005, the counts in Sheboygan County bottom out at 21,100 vehicles per day just south of the Manitowoc County line.

I-43 passes Cleveland on the county line. The highway continues to follow the lakeshore to straddle Manitowoc's westside, passing west of Newton, Wisconsin, with a weigh station for southbound truck drivers located midway between Newton and Cleveland. I-43 connects with US 151 and WIS 42. WIS 42 north follows the freeway north to the interchange with US 10. WIS 42 leaves to the east along with US 10 east, and US 10 west follows I-43 north to the interchange with WIS 310 where it turns off to the west. The Interstate passes Francis Creek and Maribel (at WIS 147) and turns northwestward into Brown County, with a rest stop located just before the county line. I-43 in Manitowoc County has the least traveled portion of the highway with 17,400 vehicles passing south of WIS 147 according to 2005 results. These values increase further south.

The Interstate passes Denmark and meets the terminus of WIS 96 one mile (1.6 km) north of the county line. The Interstate then continues another seven miles (11 km) to Bellevue where US 141 begins. This interchange provides access to WIS 29, a route the freeway crosses under later. At this point, the Interstate enters urban residential areas as it approaches Green Bay. I-43 junctions with WIS 172 in Allouez, then turns northeast to bypass Green Bay to the east, passing under the aforementioned WIS 29. After turning northwestward, the Interstate intersects WIS 54 and WIS 57 and crosses the Fox River on the Leo Frigo Memorial Bridge, passing through a heavily industrialized area near the Port of Green Bay. I-43 ends at I-41/US 41/US 141. I-43's lowest traffic volume in this county is at the southernmost entry with a 2006 value of 22,100 vehicles per day near Denmark. Values around Green Bay range from 34,600 to 42,200 vehicles per day.

== History ==
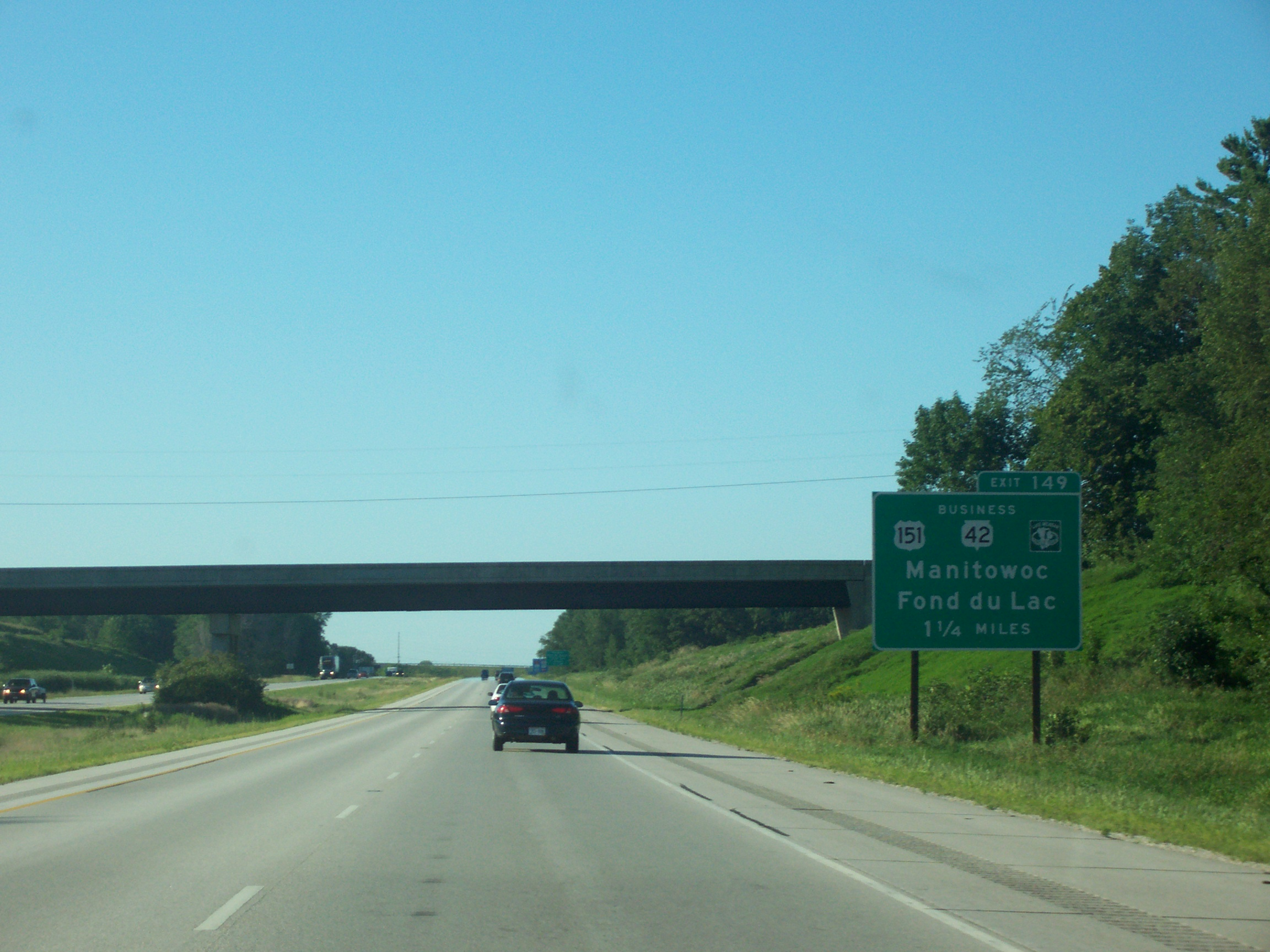
I-43 in Manitowoc

Wisconsin had anticipated the Interstates with studies of possible toll roads. When the original Interstate System was approved, the state was only given two routes: I-90 and I-94. The Wisconsin Transportation Commission submitted a request to add an Interstate in 1953 connecting Milwaukee to Green Bay, a request the federal government denied. After a study by the Wisconsin Turnpike Commission (which was established in 1953), a request was submitted in 1963 for a route that connected Milwaukee and Superior by way of Green Bay, Wausau, Hurley, and Ashland which could be completed in increments. However, only the Milwaukee-to-Green Bay segment was approved.

The original plan for the northern part of I-43 was to locate it midway between US 141 and US 41, using most of the current alignment of WIS 57 north of WIS 33 in Saukville; additionally, it was proposed to use the Interstate 57 number, though that was changed due to resistance from Illinois to extend its portion through Chicago. But farmers and landowners within the corridor opposed the plan. According to the opponents of the I-43 construction, what the commission revealed as their plan to construct I-43 along the WIS 57 corridor did not reveal is that instead of using the existing right-of-way, the freeway was to be built 2.25 miles (3.62 km) west of WIS 57. This was the case despite the fact that WIS 57 had a wide right-of-way of 300 feet (91 m). Protests, including farmers bringing their cows to graze on the Wisconsin State Capitol grounds, prompted a compromise to utilize the freeway built for US 141 between Milwaukee and Sheboygan instead, building the remaining freeway for the Interstate itself. This plan, particularly the new freeway, met resistance from the Brown, Sheboygan, and Manitowoc county governments.

Construction first began in 1963 on the freeway that was, at the time, designated US 141. The first segment to begin construction was a 3.4-mile (5.5 km) segment beginning at the Port Washington Road exit in Milwaukee County. An additional 10 miles (16 km) of the highway were completed in Ozaukee County by 1964. In 1965, a 9.3-mile (15.0 km) bypass of Sheboygan opened to traffic. The last major segment, consisting of 94.4 miles (151.9 km) of roadway, was started in 1972 after the last of these governments, Manitowoc County, pledged its support. The portion in Milwaukee County extending from the Port Washington Road exit to the Marquette Interchange was completed in 1981 to open the route. The route through Milwaukee was platted through the Black-American neighborhood of Bronzeville. Historically, segregation and related issues meant that this was the only place in Milwaukee where Black citizens could settle; it was later targeted for renewal to rid the city of what its political leadership saw as slums. The Interstate effectively finished off Bronzeville, as thousands of houses were seized via eminent domain and approximately a thousand businesses were razed.

The southwestern portion has also had a history of requests for Interstate routings. Interstate routings for such a connection between Beloit and the Milwaukee metropolitan area were requested by the Wisconsin Department of Transportation (WisDOT) but denied by the Federal Highway Administration (FHWA) in 1973. Another request for a link to Janesville was also denied. Despite the denials, local and state officials continued to seek funding to construct a freeway between these two metropolitan areas. A government collaboration called the "Highway 15 Committee" was formed to present and promote the route. Construction began on the route in the 1960s with the first segment, a 0.9-mile (1.4 km) connector linking US 45 with I-894 as part of the project to build the Hale Interchange connecting the pending route with I-894. The new connector received the US 45 designation as that highway was transferred onto the freeway heading north. The first long segment was completed in 1969. It extended from the US 45 connector to CTH-F (now WIS 164) in Big Bend. After this segment was opened, the WIS 15 designation was applied. The next segment, to East Troy, was opened in 1972, the year the Highway 15 Committee had hoped the route would be completed in its entirety. It was extended to Elkhorn in 1973 in conjunction with the US 12 freeway construction, then to I-90 in 1976. I-43 signs were placed on the freeway by 1988 after designation in 1987, replacing WIS 15. I-43 was also mapped concurrently with I-94 and I-894 to link the two segments together. Even though exit number tabs were labeled according to the new mileposts, the mileposts themselves were not renumbered to coincide with the current length until 1991.

The Marquette Interchange, which connects I-43 with I-94, and I-794, was completely reconstructed over a four-year span, beginning in October 2004 and ending in September 2008. This project eliminated lefthand exits and widened connecting ramps between I-94 and I-43.

In the 2020s, the entire I-43 corridor was designated as an Alternative Fuel Corridor for electric vehicles.

== Major accidents ==
A multiple-vehicle collision on the northbound lanes of I-43 involving 52 vehicles, killing three and injuring at least 30 others, occurred on the Tower Drive Bridge at 6:45 am March 12, 1990. The cause was a wall of fog with extremely limited visibility near the Fox River on an otherwise clear day.

On October 10, 2002, a multiple-vehicle collision occurred on I-43, just south of Cedar Grove. The crash occurred on southbound I-43 in Sheboygan County just north of the Ozaukee–Sheboygan county line. It involved 50 vehicles and was found to have been caused by low visibility due to fog at a point where the freeway comes its closest to paralleling Lake Michigan, 0.7 miles (1.1 km) from shore. The crash and resulting fires led to the deaths of 10 individuals, making this crash the deadliest in Wisconsin history. In addition to the fatalities, 36 people were also injured in the pileup. According to witnesses at the scene, fire from the wreckage rose over 20–30 feet (6.1–9.1 m) into the air. First responders said many of the bodies they recovered were burned beyond recognition. Then-Sheboygan County Sheriff Loni Koenig said of the crash site, "In my 21 years [of law enforcement], this is the most horrific scene I have ever seen, and I'm sure that it is for many of the people there." The crash has since been described as the worst traffic crash in Wisconsin state history.

Another multiple-vehicle collision occurred on March 5, 2019, on the Leo Frigo Bridge because of ice on the bridge. Nobody was severely injured.

== Future ==
I-43 is currently being widened from four to six lanes in total north of Milwaukee from Silver Spring Drive to WIS 60, with the anticipated completion in late 2024. Rest Area 51 and 52 in Manitowoc County between Cooperstown and Denmark will be replaced with a newer facilities beginning in 2024 and ending in 2025.

== Exit list ==
County	Location	mi	km	Exit	Destinations	Notes
Rock	Beloit	0.00	0.00	1A-B	I-39 / I-90 – Chicago, Madison	Signed as left exit 1A (I-39 south/I-90 east) & 1B (I-39 north/I-90 west); Former cloverleaf interchange diverging diamond interchange at WIS 81 (Milwaukee Road); I-39/I-90 exit 185
Rock	Town of Turtle	1.43	2.30	2	WIS 81 west CTH-X (Hart Road)	
Rock	Town of Clinton	6.97	11.22	6	WIS 140 – Clinton, Avalon	
Walworth	Town of Darien	14.99	24.12	15	US 14 – Janesville, Darien, Whitewater	
Walworth	Town of Darien	17.92	28.84	17	CTH-X – Delavan, Darien	
Walworth	Town of Delavan	21.13	34.01	21	WIS 50 – Delavan, Lake Geneva	
Walworth	Elkhorn	25.81	41.54	25	WIS 67 – Elkhorn, Williams Bay	
Walworth	Town of Lafayette	27.45	44.18	27	US 12 – Madison, Lake Geneva	Signed as exits 27A (US 12 east) and 27B (US 12 west)
Walworth	Town of Lafayette	28.98	46.64	29	WIS 11 – Elkhorn, Burlington	
Walworth	Town of Lafayette	34.04	54.78	33	CTH-D (Bowers Road) – Honey Creek	
Walworth	Town of East Troy	36.78	59.19	36	WIS 120 – East Troy, Lake Geneva	
Walworth	East Troy	38.54	62.02	38	WIS 20 – East Troy, Waterford	
Waukesha	Mukwonago	43.84	70.55	43	WIS 83 – Waterford, Mukwonago	Southwestern end for Rock Freeway name
Waukesha	Big Bend	50.71	81.61	50	WIS 164 (Big Bend Road) – Waukesha, Big Bend	
Waukesha	New Berlin	54.11	87.08	54	CTH-Y (Racine Avenue) – Muskego	
Waukesha	New Berlin	56.99– 57.04	91.72– 91.80	57	CTH-O (Moorland Road)	
Waukesha	New Berlin	58.88	94.76	59	To WIS 100 (Layton Avenue)	Northbound exit and southbound entrance
Milwaukee	Greenfield	60.92	98.04	60	US 45 south / WIS 100 (108th Street)	Southern end of US 45 concurrency; southbound exit and northbound entrance, northbound exit is via exit 59
Milwaukee	Greenfield	61.09	98.31	61	I-41 north (Zoo Freeway) / I-894 west / US 41 north / US 45 north – Fond du Lac, Madison	Western end of I-41/I-894 concurrency; northern end of US 45 concurrency; signed as exit 4 southbound; concurrency uses I-894 exit numbers; northeastern end of Rock Freeway name; western end of Airport Freeway name; Hale Interchange
Milwaukee	Greenfield	62.49	100.57	5	76th Street (CTH-U), 84th Street	Signed as exits 5A (South 76th Street) and 5B (South 84th Street)
Milwaukee	Greenfield	62.78	101.03	5A	WIS 24 west (Forest Home Avenue)	Southbound exit and northbound entrance
Milwaukee	Greenfield	63.51	102.21	7	60th St.	
Milwaukee	Greenfield	64.51	103.82	8	WIS 36 (Loomis Road)	
Milwaukee	Milwaukee	65.55– 65.56	105.49– 105.51	9	WIS 241 (27th Street)	Signed as exits 9A (WIS 241 south) and 9B (WIS 241 north) southbound
Milwaukee	Milwaukee	66.22– 66.25	106.57– 106.62	10; 316	I-41 south (North–South Freeway) / I-94 east / US 41 south – Chicago, Mitchell Airport	Eastern end of I-41/I-894/US 41 concurrency; southern end of I-94 concurrency; signed as exits 10A (I-43 north/I-94 west) and 10B (I-41 south/I-94 east/US 41 south) northbound, and as no number (I-94 east/US 41 south) and exit 316 (I-43 south/I-894 west) westbound; concurrency uses I-94 exit numbers; eastern end of Airport Freeway name; southern end of North–South Freeway name; Mitchell Interchange
Milwaukee	Milwaukee	67.73– 68.30	109.00– 109.92	314	Holt Avenue, Howard Avenue	Signed as exits 314A (Holt Avenue) and 314B (Howard Avenue) southbound
Milwaukee	Milwaukee	70.01– 70.56	112.67– 113.56	312	Becher Street, Mitchell Street, Lapham Boulevard, Greenfield Avenue, Lincoln Avenue	Signed as exits 312A (Lapham Boulevard) and 312B (Becher Street) southbound
Milwaukee	Milwaukee	71.26	114.68	311	WIS 59 (National Avenue) / 6th Street	
Milwaukee	Milwaukee	71.73	115.44	310C	I-794 (East–West Freeway) – Lakefront, Port of Milwaukee	Marquette Interchange; signed as exit 72B southbound; I-794 exit 1
Milwaukee	Milwaukee	71.86	115.65	310B	I-94 west (East–West Freeway) – Madison	Northern end of I-94 concurrency; Marquette Interchange; signed as exit 72D southbound
Milwaukee	Milwaukee	72.25	116.28	72A	Michigan Street, 10th Street	Northbound exit and southbound entrance
Milwaukee	Milwaukee	72.44	116.58	72C	Kilbourn Avenue	Northbound exit only
Milwaukee	Milwaukee	72.74	117.06	72E	US 18 (Highland Avenue, 11th Street)	Southbound exit and northbound entrance
Milwaukee	Milwaukee	72.91	117.34	73A	WIS 145 (Fond du Lac Avenue, McKinley Avenue)	
Milwaukee	Milwaukee	73.70	118.61	73B	North Avenue	
Milwaukee	Milwaukee	74.67	120.17	74	Locust Street	
Milwaukee	Milwaukee	75.40– 74.46	121.34– 119.83	75	Keefe Avenue, Atkinson Avenue	
Milwaukee	Milwaukee	75.94– 76.16	122.21– 122.57	76	WIS 57 / WIS 190 (Capitol Drive, Green Bay Avenue)	No southbound exit to northbound WIS 57; signed as exits 76A (WIS 57/WIS 190 east) and 76B (WIS 57/WIS 190 west) northbound
Milwaukee	Glendale	76.93	123.81	77	Hampton Avenue	Southbound exit and northbound entrance; signed as exits 77A (east) and 77B (west)
Milwaukee	Glendale	78.03– 78.05	125.58– 125.61	78	Silver Spring Drive, Port Washington Road	
Milwaukee	River Hills	80.13	128.96	80	CTH-PP (Good Hope Road)	
Milwaukee	Bayside	82.03	132.01	82	WIS 32 south / LMCT WIS 100 west (Brown Deer Road)	Southern end of WIS 32 concurrency; currently being converted to diverging diamond interchange
Ozaukee	Mequon	83.58	134.51	83	CTH-W (Port Washington Road), County Line Road	Became a full interchange in 2023
Ozaukee	Mequon	85.25– 85.28	137.20– 137.24	85	WIS 57 south / WIS 167 west (Mequon Road)	Southern end of WIS 57 concurrency
Ozaukee	Mequon	87.41	140.67	87	Highland Road	
Ozaukee	Town of Grafton	89.33	143.76	89	CTH-C (Pioneer Road) – Cedarburg	
Ozaukee	Grafton	92.14	148.28	92	WIS 60 west (Washington Street) / CTH-Q east (Ulao Road) – Grafton, Cedarburg, Ulao	
Ozaukee	Town of Grafton	93.56– 93.58	150.57– 150.60	93	WIS 32 north (Spring Street) / CTH-V south (Grafton Avenue) / LMCT – Grafton, Port Washington	Northern end of WIS 32 concurrency; northern end of North–South Freeway
Ozaukee	Saukville	96.66	155.56	96	WIS 33 (Grand Avenue) – Saukville, Port Washington	
Ozaukee	Town of Saukville	97.54	156.98	97	WIS 57 north – Fredonia, Random Lake, Waldo, Plymouth	Northern end of WIS 57 concurrency; northbound exit and southbound entrance
Ozaukee	Town of Port Washington	100.73	162.11	100	WIS 32 south (Wisconsin Street) / CTH-H west / LMCT – Fredonia, Port Washington	Southern end of WIS 32 concurrency; CTH-H is the former WIS 84
Ozaukee	Town of Belgium	107.57	173.12	107	CTH-D – Belgium, Lake Church	
Sheboygan	Town of Holland	112.82	181.57	113	WIS 32 north – Cedar Grove	Northern end of WIS 32 concurrency
Sheboygan	Town of Holland	116.71– 116.74	187.83– 187.87	116	CTH-AA (Foster Road) – Oostburg	
Sheboygan	Town of Wilson	120.36– 120.39	193.70– 193.75	120	CTH-V / CTH-OK (South Business Drive) – Waldo	
Sheboygan	Town of Sheboygan	123.31– 123.35	198.45– 198.51	123	WIS 28 (Washington Avenue) / CTH-A / CTH-TA / LMCT – Sheboygan, Sheboygan Falls	
Sheboygan	Sheboygan	125.90	202.62	126	WIS 23 (Kohler Memorial Drive) – Sheboygan, Fond du Lac, Kohler, Plymouth	Cloverleaf interchange; signed as exit 126A eastbound, exit 126B westbound
Sheboygan	Town of Sheboygan	128.60	206.96	128	WIS 42 (Calumet Drive) / LMCT – Sheboygan, Howards Grove	
Sheboygan	Town of Mosel	131.50	211.63	131	Rowe Road / Golf Event Traffic	Southbound entrance, northbound exit; event-only ramp for Whistling Straits
Manitowoc	Town of Centerville	137.57	221.40	137	CTH-XX – Kiel, Cleveland	Former WIS 149
Manitowoc	Town of Newton	144.17	232.02	144	CTH-C – St. Nazianz, Newton	
Manitowoc	Manitowoc	149.76	241.02	149	US 151 south (Calumet Avenue) / WIS 42 / LMCT – Manitowoc, Fond du Lac	Northern terminus of US 151 and I-43 Alt
Manitowoc	Manitowoc	151.72	244.17	152	US 10 east (Waldo Boulevard) / CTH-JJ north – Manitowoc, Sturgeon Bay	Southern end of US 10 concurrency; to Sturgeon Bay not signed southbound
Manitowoc	Town of Manitowoc Rapids	154.75	249.05	154	US 10 west / WIS 310 – Appleton, Two Rivers	Northern end of US 10 concurrency
Manitowoc	Town of Kossuth	157.80	253.95	157	CTH-V – Mishicot, Francis Creek	
Manitowoc	Town of Kossuth	160.53	258.35	160	CTH-K – Kellnersville	
Manitowoc	Town of Cooperstown	164.24	264.32	164	WIS 147 / CTH-Z – Maribel, Mishicot, Two Rivers	Mishicot not signed southbound, Two Rivers not signed northbound
Brown	Denmark	170.83	274.92	171	WIS 96 / CTH-KB – Greenleaf, Denmark	
Brown	Town of Ledgeview	177.99	286.45	178	US 141 (Main Street) / CTH-MM to WIS 29 – Bellevue, Kewaunee	
Brown	Bellevue	180.49	290.47	180	WIS 172 west to I-41 / US 41 / WIS 32 – Austin Straubel International Airport	To I-41 not signed northbound while WIS 32 not signed southbound
Brown	Bellevue	181.71	292.43	181	CTH-JJ / Manitowoc Road	
Brown	Green Bay	183.20– 183.23	294.83– 294.88	183	CTH-V / Mason Street	
Brown	Green Bay	185.39– 185.42	298.36– 298.40	185	WIS 54 / WIS 57 / LMCT (University Avenue) – Sturgeon Bay, Algoma, Green Bay	
Brown	Green Bay	187.60– 187.63	301.91– 301.96	187	Webster Avenue, East Shore Drive	
Brown	Green Bay			Leo Frigo Memorial Bridge over the Fox River		
Brown	Green Bay	189.60	305.13	189	Atkinson Drive	
Brown	Howard	191.40– 191.76	308.03– 308.61	192B	I-41 south / US 41 south to WIS 29 – Appleton	Northbound exit and southbound entrance; exit 170B on I-41; no access to US 141 south; northern terminus of I-41
Brown	Howard	191.40– 191.76	308.03– 308.61	192A	US 41 / US 141 north / LMCT – Marinette, Iron Mountain	Exit 170B on US 41
1.000 mi = 1.609 km; 1.000 km = 0.621 mi: Concurrency terminus; Incomplete access

== Alternate route ==
Alternate Interstate 43
- Location: Manitowoc, Sheboygan, Ozaukee, Milwaukee, and Waukesha counties

I-43 has an alternate route within Manitowoc, Sheboygan, Ozaukee, and Milwaukee counties for situations requiring a road closure starting at WIS 83 at exit 43 in Mukwonago to Calumet Avenue (US 151) at exit 149 in Manitowoc, mainly using the former US 141 and WIS 15 locally known as Port Washington Road and designated as CTH-W in Milwaukee and Ozaukee counties, while as a series of roads in Waukesha County. Past WIS 33 in Saukville, the divided limited-access WIS 57 at the I-43/WIS 57 split is designated Alt. I-43 to WIS 23 in Plymouth, where it diverts off WIS 32 at Sheboygan, then north to WIS 42 at Howards Grove north to Manitowoc.
