= West Milwaukee, Wisconsin =

- Village
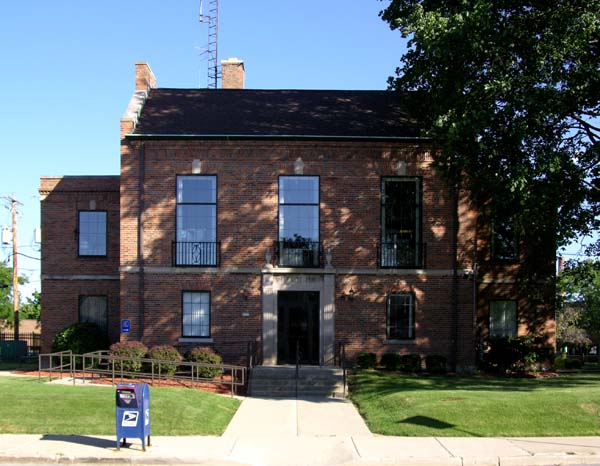
- Village Hall and Police Station

- Location of West Milwaukee in Milwaukee County, Wisconsin.
- Coordinates: 43°0′52″N 87°58′24″W
- Country: United States
- State: Wisconsin
- County: Milwaukee

Area
  - Total: 1.12 sq mi (2.90 km^{2})
  - Land: 1.12 sq mi (2.90 km^{2})
  - Water: 0 sq mi (0.00 km^{2})
- Elevation: 653 ft (199 m)

Population (2020)
  - Total: 4,114
  - Density: 3,670/sq mi (1,420/km^{2})
- Time zone: UTC-6 (Central (CST))
  - Summer (DST): UTC-5 (CDT)
- Area code: 414
- FIPS code: 55-85875
- GNIS feature ID: 1576537
- Website: westmilwaukee.org

West Milwaukee is a village in Milwaukee County, Wisconsin, United States. It is located in the center of the county, approximately 1 mi (1.6 km) south of American Family Field. The population was 4,114 at the 2020 census.

== History ==
The history of West Milwaukee, Wisconsin, is tightly linked to the industrial and railroad expansion of the greater Milwaukee area in the late 19th and early 20th centuries. Before its formal incorporation, the area served as a critical nexus for commerce and transportation, primarily due to its proximity to major rail lines.

The land that became West Milwaukee was initially part of the Town of Wauwatosa and later the Town of Greenfield. Its destiny was shaped by the arrival of the Chicago, Milwaukee & St. Paul Railway (Milwaukee Road), which established significant shops, roundhouses, and switching yards here.

This infrastructure drew various manufacturing and industrial firms seeking cheap land and excellent freight access near Milwaukee's burgeoning urban core. This area quickly became a heavily industrialized, but largely unincorporated, pocket surrounded by the growing city and other towns. As the City of Milwaukee expanded its borders and began imposing higher taxes and stricter regulations on adjacent industrial properties, the businesses in this unincorporated area felt pressure. In response to this, the area’s industrial leaders successfully lobbied for self-governance. The village was incorporated in 1906 to provide low taxes for industry. This act of incorporation was a deliberate strategy by companies like the Milwaukee Road and others to maintain a low-tax environment and minimize municipal intervention, allowing them to operate efficiently and profitably. While West Milwaukee was founded for industry, it also became home to many of the workers employed in the rail yards and factories. The residential areas developed around the massive industrial facilities, forming a working-class community with its own distinct identity. Although physically surrounded by larger municipalities, the village has maintained its independent status throughout the 20th century, largely sustaining itself on the high property tax base provided by the dense concentration of industrial and commercial properties. Its history is a clear example of how strategic incorporation and economic priorities shaped the political and physical geography of Milwaukee County.

== Geography ==
West Milwaukee is located at 43°0′52″N 87°58′24″W (43.014564, -87.973469).

According to the United States Census Bureau, the village has a total area of 1.12 square miles (2.90 km^{2}), all land.

== Demographics ==
Historical population
| Census | Pop. | Note | %± |
|---|---|---|---|
| 1910 | 1,458 | | — |
| 1920 | 2,101 | | 44.1% |
| 1930 | 4,168 | | 98.4% |
| 1940 | 5,010 | | 20.2% |
| 1950 | 5,429 | | 8.4% |
| 1960 | 5,043 | | −7.1% |
| 1970 | 4,405 | | −12.7% |
| 1980 | 3,535 | | −19.8% |
| 1990 | 3,973 | | 12.4% |
| 2000 | 4,201 | | 5.7% |
| 2010 | 4,206 | | 0.1% |
| 2020 | 4,114 | | −2.2% |
U.S. Decennial Census

=== 2010 census ===
As of the census of 2010, there were 4,206 people, 1,979 households, and 856 families living in the village. The population density was 3,755.4 inhabitants per square mile (1,450.0/km^{2}). There were 2,145 housing units at an average density of 1,915.2 per square mile (739.5/km^{2}). The racial makeup of the village was 69.4% White, 10.2% African American, 0.8% Native American, 3.2% Asian, 12.1% from other races, and 4.3% from two or more races. Hispanic or Latino of any race were 25.4% of the population.

There were 1,979 households, of which 25.7% had children under the age of 18 living with them, 25.7% were married couples living together, 12.5% had a female householder with no husband present, 5.1% had a male householder with no wife present, and 56.7% were non-families. 45.6% of all households were made up of individuals, and 9.3% had someone living alone who was 65 years of age or older. The average household size was 2.12 and the average family size was 3.14.

The median age in the village was 34.7 years. 22.3% of residents were under the age of 18; 8.8% were between the ages of 18 and 24; 32.8% were from 25 to 44; 26.4% were from 45 to 64; and 9.6% were 65 years of age or older. The gender makeup of the village was 52.0% male and 48.0% female.

=== 2000 census ===
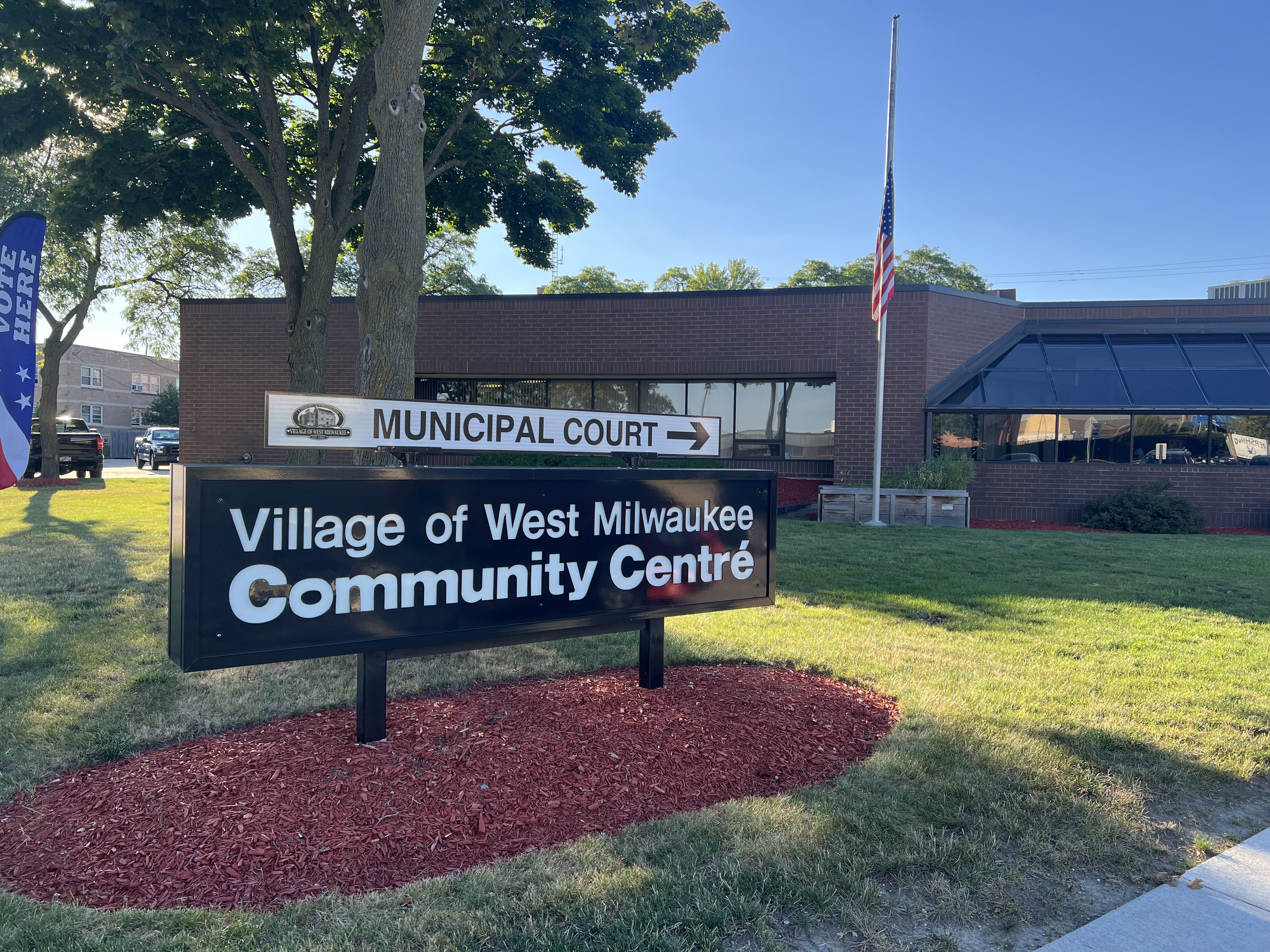
West Milwaukee community center and municipal court building

As of the census of 2000, there were 4,201 people, 2,059 households, and 891 families living in the village. The population density was 3,722.0 people per square mile (1,435.4/km^{2}). There were 2,197 housing units at an average density of 1,946.5 per square mile (750.7/km^{2}). The racial makeup of the village was 83.58% White, 3.50% African American, 1.55% Native American, 2.55% Asian, 0.07% Pacific Islander, 5.86% from other races, and 2.90% from two or more races. Hispanic or Latino of any race were 12.00% of the population.

There were 2,059 households, out of which 22.0% had children under the age of 18 living with them, 27.5% were married couples living together, 10.5% had a female householder with no husband present, and 56.7% were non-families. 46.1% of all households were made up of individuals, and 13.4% had someone living alone who was 65 years of age or older. The average household size was 2.03 and the average family size was 2.96.

In the village, the population was spread out, with 20.8% under the age of 18, 10.3% from 18 to 24, 34.8% from 25 to 44, 20.2% from 45 to 64, and 13.9% who were 65 years of age or older. The median age was 36 years. For every 100 females, there were 103.7 males. For every 100 females age 18 and over, there were 103.8 males.

The median income for a household in the village was $35,250, and the median income for a family was $43,036. Males had a median income of $34,135 versus $23,234 for females. The per capita income for the village was $18,396. About 7.5% of families and 11.6% of the population were below the poverty line, including 9.1% of those under age 18 and 23.0% of those age 65 or over.

== Property Taxes ==
As of 2018, Wisconsin had some of the highest property taxes in the country. The state's average effective property tax rate is 1.96%, (median real estate taxes paid: $3,257) the ninth highest average of any state in the U.S. As of 2016 West Milwaukee was the ninth highest taxed ($32.38 per $1000 of assessed value) municipality in the state of Wisconsin.

== Education ==
West Milwaukee is served by the West Allis – West Milwaukee School District. Schools within the village's boundaries include:

- Pershing Elementary School
- West Milwaukee Intermediate School (formerly West Milwaukee High School)
- West Milwaukee also has one private school:
- Cristo Rey Jesuit High School (formerly St. Florian's Parish School)

== Recreation ==
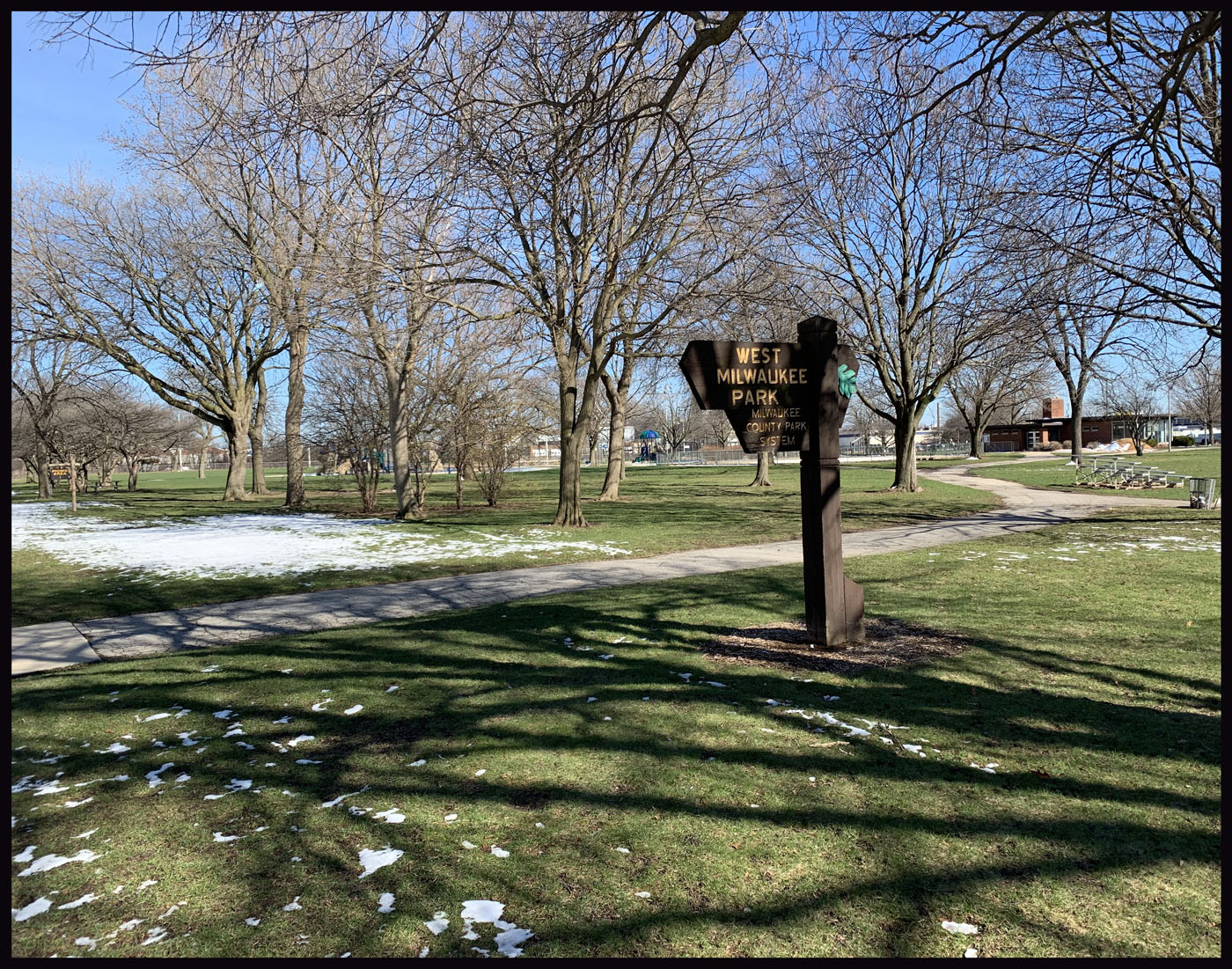
West Milwaukee Park

West Milwaukee has three parks: West Milwaukee Park, Centennial Park and Lions Park. West Milwaukee park is the largest park in the village with an area of 21.1 acres. It has a walking or jogging track, a wading pool, a children's play center and two baseball diamonds.
