= Wisconsin State Trunk Highway System =

Highway system in Wisconsin, United States

- Highway markers for Interstate 94, U.S. Highway 12 and WIS 35

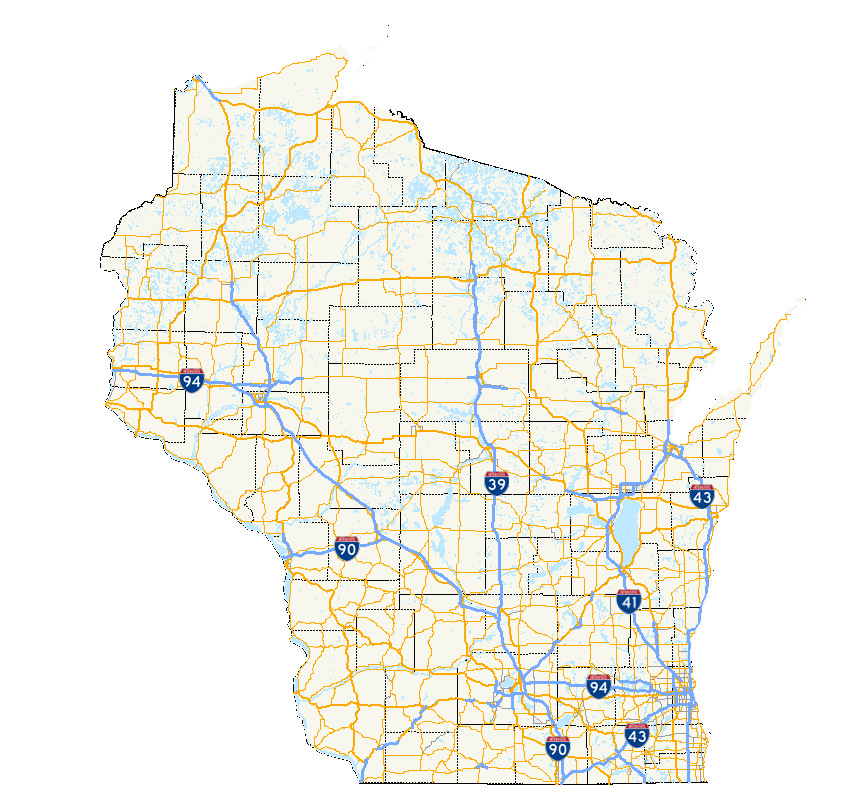
- A map of all highways in Wisconsin.

System information
- Maintained by WisDOT
- Length: 11,753 mi (18,915 km)
- Formed: 1918

Highway names
- Interstates: Interstate n (I-n)
- US Highways: U.S. Highway n (US n)
- State: (State Trunk) Highway n (STH-n or WIS n)

System links
- Wisconsin State Trunk Highway System; Interstate; US; State; Scenic; Rustic

The Wisconsin State Trunk Highway System is the state highway system of the U.S. state of Wisconsin, including Wisconsin's segments of the Interstate Highway System and the United States Numbered Highway System, in addition to its other state trunk highways. These separate types of highways are respectively designated with an I-, US, or STH- (or WIS) prefix. The system also includes minor roads designated as Scenic Byways, four routes intended to promote tourism to scenic and historic areas of the state; and as Rustic Roads, lightly traveled and often unpaved local roads which the state has deemed worthy of preservation and protection. The state highway system, altogether totaling 11,753 miles (18,915 km) across all of Wisconsin's 72 counties, is maintained by the Wisconsin Department of Transportation (WisDOT).

== Highway systems ==
=== Interstate and U.S. highways ===
The state of Wisconsin is served by eight Interstate Highways, consisting of five primary routes and three auxiliary routes. The first part of this system was constructed in 1956, and its most recent expansion took place in 2015, with the addition of I-41 to the system. Wisconsin's longest Interstate Highway is I-94, at 348 miles (560 km), and its shortest is I-535, which extends only 1.2 miles (1.9 km) into the state.

There are also fourteen United States Numbered Highways in the state of Wisconsin, which were designated beginning in 1926 and ending in the mid-1930s. The routes of the U.S. Highway System in Wisconsin have remained essentially unchanged since U.S. Highway 16 became a state highway in 1978. There are also several business routes, usually maintained by local governments.

=== State trunk highways ===
The state of Wisconsin maintains 153 state trunk highways, ranging from two-lane rural roads to limited-access freeways. These highways are paid for by the state's Transportation Fund, which is considered unique among state highway funds because it is kept entirely separate from the general fund, therefore, revenues received from transportation services are required to be used on transportation. The majority of state highway funding comes from gas taxes and vehicle registration fees.

=== Other state highways ===
WisDOT also develops and maintains some minor routes, under the designations of Scenic Byways and Rustic Roads. Scenic Byways are minor roads, typically two-lanes, that travel through areas of "scenic and historic interest." Rustic Roads are lightly traveled local roads, sometimes paved and sometimes dirt or gravel, whose rustic characteristics are intentionally maintained and preserved by WisDOT.

=== Other highways in Wisconsin ===
All 72 counties in Wisconsin maintain their own system of county highways, which are usually small, have low levels of traffic, and terminate at the limits of cities and towns. Each highway is designated with a label of between one and three letters, and are usually named sequentially, starting with Highway A and continuing to Z, then using double letters from AA to ZZ, and using triple letters if necessary, although this is not a requirement and there are plenty of exceptions.

The various cities, towns, and villages of the state each maintain their own roads beyond this, servicing individual homes and businesses and connecting them to the other systems, although these are not typically referred to as highways.

There are also several types and systems of roads in Wisconsin that are not part of any state or local highway system, and are not specifically constructed or maintained by the state Department of Transportation or by any local agency.

- Forest Highways are routes through National Forests, and are thus designated by the United States Forest Service.
- The Kettle Moraine Scenic Drive is a marked route that follows county and local roads past historical markers and attractions in the Kettle Moraine. It extends between Whitewater and Elkhart Lake.
- The Lake Michigan Circle Tour and the Lake Superior Circle Tour encircle Lake Michigan and Lake Superior, respectively.
- Minnesota State Highway 23 passes through Wisconsin in Douglas County for about 1/2 mile (0.80 km) before returning to Minnesota.
- The Yellowstone Trail was the first transcontinental automobile highway to be constructed through the upper tier of states in the United States. It was exempted from a state law banning privately designated highways in 1917.

== History ==
=== 19th century ===
The many precursors to the state highway system predate the development of motorized vehicles by several decades, and the earliest even predate European settlement. For example, parts of the Native American trail connecting Green Bay to Sault Ste. Marie, Michigan, have now become US 41. In the early 19th century, wagon roads were created so that people and supplies could be transported from one settlement to another in days rather than weeks. Beginning in the 1830s, these routes were primarily improved and maintained by the United States military. These routes were gradually replaced by a decentralized network of both private plank roads and early territorial and state roads which, while created by the state government, were the responsibility of towns and villages to build and maintain. However, by the end of the 19th century, particularly before the popularization of the automobile, railroads became dominant and largely supplanted the state's roadways as means of long-distance transportation.

=== 20th century ===
The Wisconsin constitution had to be changed in order for the state to be able to pay for its new highway projects. After approval by the state legislators, an amendment was passed allowing Wisconsin to use funds for highway construction, in 1908. In 1911, the Wisconsin Highway Commission was established as a central planning organization for the state's first motorized roadways. Countless "auto trails" were created in the mid-1910s. Many of these used inefficient routes and were inconsistent. In 1917, the commission began developing a standardized numbering system in response to the proliferation of privately marked highway systems. The state legislature made this practice illegal in 1917, in a law that also provided for the creation and marking of a state trunk highway system, that would be required to provide access to every county seat and all towns with a population over 5,000 and was limited to a total length of 5,000 miles (8,047 km). The first signposts were erected in May 1918. Thus, Wisconsin became the first state in the country to officially mark and number its state highways. This highway system was quickly copied by Michigan, and eventually to all other states.

Wisconsin's first distinctive route marker (required by the 1917 legislation) was an inverted triangle. The triangle by itself was found in practice not to use space efficiently. The distinctive route marker was eventually redesigned and codified to be the union of an inverted triangle and a rounded rectangle in 1933; this shape remains in use today. In 1925, a state highway fund was established, including a two-cent-per-gallon fuel tax. In 1929, the original highway commission was abolished and replaced with a new commission. The commission had 375 employees by 1930.

The first U.S. Numbered Highways were established in Wisconsin in 1926, in many cases taking the place of highways the state had already established. As a result, the goals of the state highway system were expanded, aiming to reach every town with a population over 2,500 and relaxing its previous upper bound on network length. During the Great Depression, the state of Wisconsin launched a large number of public works projects in accordance with the New Deal, which led to massive expansions of the state system. By the 1940s, the system reached 12,000 miles (19,312 km), approximately its current length.

The Wisconsin Turnpike Commission was established in 1953, which was tasked with the creation of larger, toll roads. The commission proposed various projects, including one from the Illinois border, extending through Madison, and terminating in La Crosse. Various other projects were proposed, but no action was taken initially. Eventually, it was decided that having toll roads in Wisconsin would not be practical.

The introduction of the Interstate Highway System in the mid-1950s led the Wisconsin Highway Commission to begin developing other controlled-access freeways to complement the federal system. The focal point of this construction was in Milwaukee, where 112 miles (180 km) of freeways were planned, although the system's growth became a major point of contention and only half of the planned routes were built. In 1967, the Wisconsin Department of Transportation was established, by merging various smaller entities.

== Future ==
In 1999, WisDOT began developing State Highway Plan 2020, which lays an outline for the further development and maintenance of the state highway system into the near future. The plan classifies the state's highways into five categories based on their importance to the successful functioning of the network as a whole:

- Corridors 2020 backbone routes, consisting of the state's largest and most crucial routes: I-39, I-41, I-43, I-90, I-94, US 10, US 41, US 51, US 53, US 151, and WIS 29.
- Corridors 2020 connector routes, consisting of routes that primarily serve to connect cities and areas to the backbones listed above: US 2, US 8, US 12, US 14, US 61, US 63, WIS 13, WIS 21, and WIS 26.
- Other principal arterials, routes that connect areas within a specific region, or serve as major routes within cities.
- Minor arterials, which connect small towns and rural areas to larger routes and to each other.
- Collectors and local function roads, the smallest and least-trafficked routes in the system.
