= Baraboo–Wisconsin Dells Airport =

Airport in Delton, United States of America

Baraboo–Dells Airport
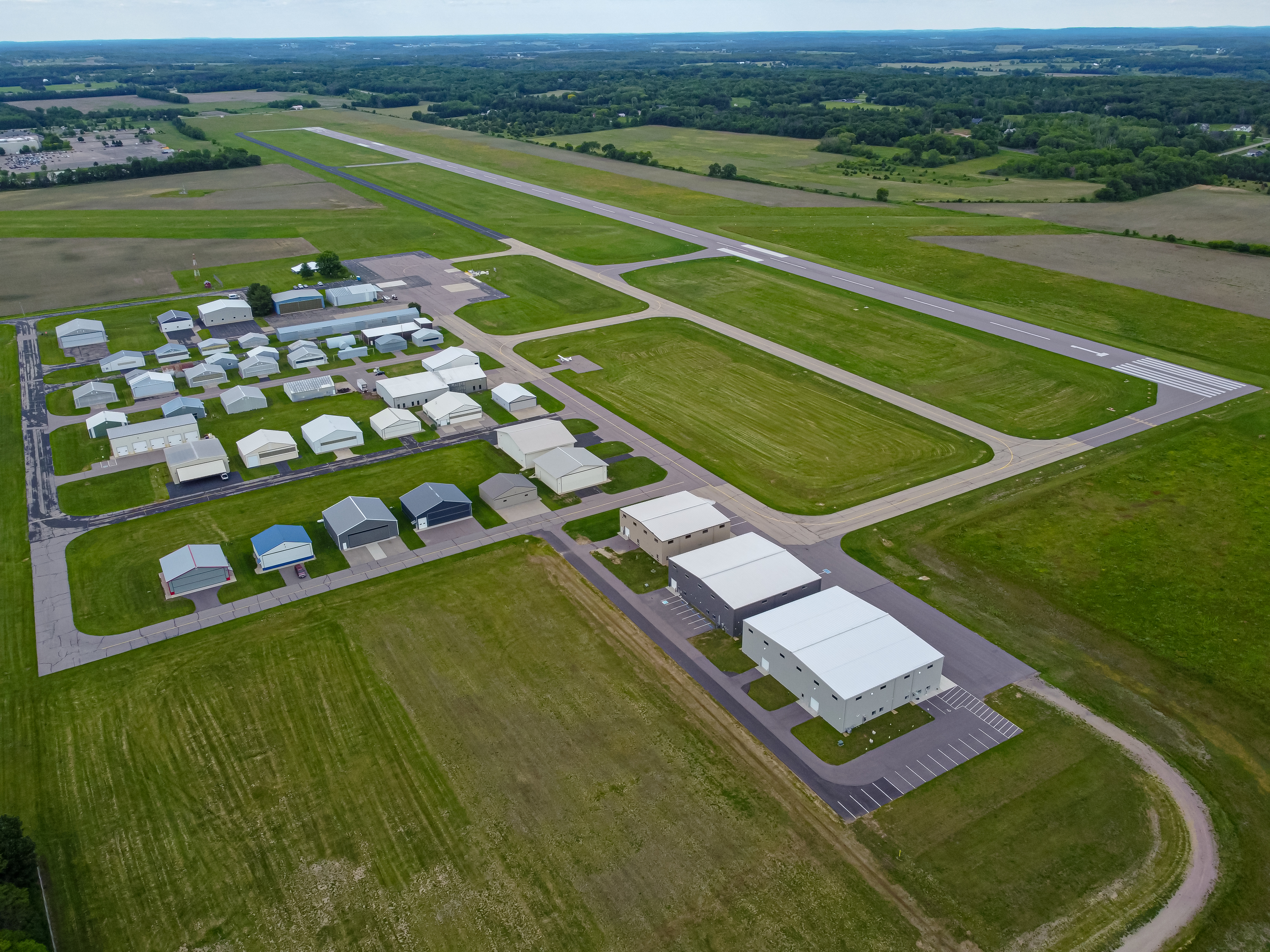
- IATA: none; ICAO: KDLL; FAA LID: DLL

Summary
- Airport type: Public
- Owner: Village of Lake Delton
- Operator: Village of Lake Delton
- Serves: Baraboo, Wisconsin Dells, Lake Delton
- Opened: October 1945
- Time zone: CST (UTC−06:00)
  - Summer (DST): CDT (UTC−05:00)
- Elevation AMSL: 980 ft (300 m)
- Coordinates: 43°31′19″N 089°46′17″W
- Website: https://www.lakedeltonwi.gov/166/Baraboo-Dells-Airport

Map
- Location of airport in Wisconsin DLL (the United States)

Runways
Direction	Length		Surface
Direction	ft	m	Surface
1/19	5,010	1,527 m	Asphalt
14/32	2,725	831 m	Turf

Statistics
- Aircraft operations (2024): 30,000
- Based aircraft (2024): 51
- Source: Federal Aviation Administration

Baraboo–Wisconsin Dells Airport (ICAO: KDLL, FAA LID: DLL) is a public use airport located three nautical miles (6 km) northwest of the central business district of Baraboo, in Sauk County, Wisconsin, United States. The airport is located between Baraboo and Lake Delton, Wisconsin, on US 12, and is adjacent to the Ho-Chunk Casino.

It is included in the Federal Aviation Administration (FAA) National Plan of Integrated Airport Systems for 2025–2029, in which it is categorized as a regional general aviation facility.

Although most U.S. airports use the same three-letter location identifier for the FAA and IATA, this airport is assigned DLL by the FAA but has no designation from the IATA (which assigned DLL to Dillon County Airport in Dillon, South Carolina).

== History ==
It was originally known as Berry's Dells Airport. It was built and owned by Clinton DeWitt Berry in 1928, the proprietor of Berry's Coldwater Canyon Hotel and Golf Course, now part of the Chula Vista Resort. The airport originally comprised 60 acres and was designated on government maps as beacon No. 19. It was also on the Milwaukee-Minneapolis route to the northern airways. Upon announcing the opening of the landing field on May 26, 1928, Berry said, "I look for large numbers of planes from Chicago, St. Louis and other cities to carry visitors to the Dells this summer". Clinton Berry was the uncle of Robert Irwin Berry, owner of Berry Electric Contracting Company in Chicago, Illinois. Robert Berry was the grandfather of Robert Forbis, who used the airfield many times in his Lancair Columbia 300 aircraft. Cirrus Aircraft started at the Baraboo-Dells airport in the eighties. The airport is also home to Students In Aviation (The SIA Foundation).

== Facilities and aircraft ==
Baraboo–Wisconsin Dells Airport covers an area of 312 acres (126 ha) at an elevation of 980 feet (298 m) above mean sea level. It has two runways: 1/19 is 5,010 by 100 feet (1,527 by 30 m) with an asphalt surface and is equipped with LOC/DME; 14/32 is 2,725 by 100 feet (831 by 30 m) with a turf surface and is closed from November 15 through April 15.

Dells VORTAC is 1 mile north of the airfield.

Spring City Aviation, is the fixed-base operator.

For the 12-month period ending May 30, 2024, the airport had 30,000 aircraft operations, an average of 82 per day: 89% general aviation, 8% military and 3% air taxi.

In August 2024, there were 51 aircraft based at this airport: 43 single-engine, 3 multi-engine, 4 jet and 1 glider.

== Cargo operations ==
Airlines	Destinations
Freight Runners Express	Middleton, Milwaukee, Mineral Point

In 2017, aircraft flight tracking showed Freight Runners Express flying their Beechcraft Model 99 aircraft type for Wisconsin Dells cargo operations.

== See also ==
- Cirrus Aircraft, whose first headquarters was located on the airport
- List of airports in Wisconsin
