= Iowa County Airport =

Airport in Wisconsin, United States

- IATA: none; ICAO: KMRJ; FAA LID: MRJ

Summary
- Airport type: Public
- Owner: Iowa County
- Serves: Mineral Point, Wisconsin
- Opened: April 1962
- Time zone: CST (UTC−06:00)
  - Summer (DST): CDT (UTC−05:00)
- Elevation AMSL: 1,171 ft (357 m)
- Coordinates: 42°53′13″N 090°14′12″W

Map
- Location of airport in Wisconsin MRJ (the United States)

Runways
Direction	Length		Surface
Direction	ft	m	Surface
11/29	5,001	1,524	Asphalt
4/22	3,600	1,097	Asphalt

Statistics
- Aircraft operations (2024): 14,750
- Based aircraft (2024): 29
- Source: Federal Aviation Administration

Iowa County Airport (ICAO: KMRJ, FAA LID: MRJ) is a county-owned public-use airport located three nautical miles (6 km) northwest of the central business district of Mineral Point, a city in Iowa County, Wisconsin, United States. It is included in the Federal Aviation Administration (FAA) National Plan of Integrated Airport Systems for 2025–2029, in which it is categorized as a local general aviation facility.

Although many U.S. airports use the same three-letter location identifier for the FAA and IATA, this facility is assigned MRJ by the FAA but has no designation from the IATA (which assigned MRJ to Marcala Airport in Marcala, Honduras).

== Facilities and aircraft ==
Iowa County Airport covers an area of 383 acres (155 ha) at an elevation of 1,171 feet (357 m) above mean sea level. It has two runways with asphalt surfaces: the primary runway 11/29 is 5,001 by 75 feet (1,524 x 23 m) and the crosswind runway 4/22 is 3,600 by 60 feet (1,097 x 18 m).

For the 12-month period ending May 22, 2024, the airport had 14,750 aircraft operations, an average of 40 per day: 92% general aviation, 5% air taxi and 3% military. In August 2024, there were 29 aircraft based at this airport: 25 single-engine, 2 multi-engine and 2 helicopter.

== Cargo operations ==
Airlines	Destinations
Freight Runners Express	Milwaukee, Wisconsin Dells

== See also ==
- List of airports in Wisconsin
