= Middleton Municipal Airport =

Middleton Municipal Airport Morey Field Airport
- IATA: none; ICAO: none; FAA LID: C29

Summary
- Airport type: Public
- Owner: City of Middleton
- Operator: Morey Airplane Co.
- Serves: Middleton, Wisconsin
- Opened: September 1948
- Time zone: CST (UTC−06:00)
  - Summer (DST): CDT (UTC−05:00)
- Elevation AMSL: 928 ft / 282 m
- Coordinates: 43°06′52″N 089°31′54″W
- Website: Middleton Municipal Airport

Map
- Location of airport in Wisconsin C29 (the United States)

Runways
| Direction | Length | | Surface |
| Direction | ft | m | Surface |
|---|---|---|---|
| 10/28 | 4,001 | 1,220 | Asphalt |
| 1/19 | 1,780 | 543 | Turf |

Statistics
- Aircraft operations (2023): 40,510
- Based aircraft (2024): 91
- Sources: Federal Aviation Administration

Middleton Municipal Airport (FAA LID: C29), also known as Morey Field, is a general aviation airport located five miles (8 km) northwest of Middleton, a city in Dane County, Wisconsin, United States. It is included in the Federal Aviation Administration (FAA) National Plan of Integrated Airport Systems for 2025–2029, in which it is categorized as a regional general aviation facility.

== History ==
Morey Field was named after founder Howard Morey who started the Middleton airport in 1942. Management of the airport changed hands to Field Morey, the son of Howard and then to Richard Morey, the son of Field. The airport was sold to the city of Middleton in 1998, and its name was changed from Morey Field to Middleton Municipal Airport – Morey Field. Although the airport was sold to the city, Richard Morey still manages the FBO which provides services to airport users.

In July 2005 the city of Middleton completed a $7 million renovation of the airport including land acquisition and construction. The renovation consisted of a new terminal building and a new 4,001-foot (1,220 m) long by 100-foot (30 m) wide asphalt runway (10/28), as well as a 1,780-foot (540 m) long by 120-foot (37 m) wide crosswind turf runway (1/19).

Morey Airplane Co. is the airport's fixed-base operator.

== Facilities and aircraft ==
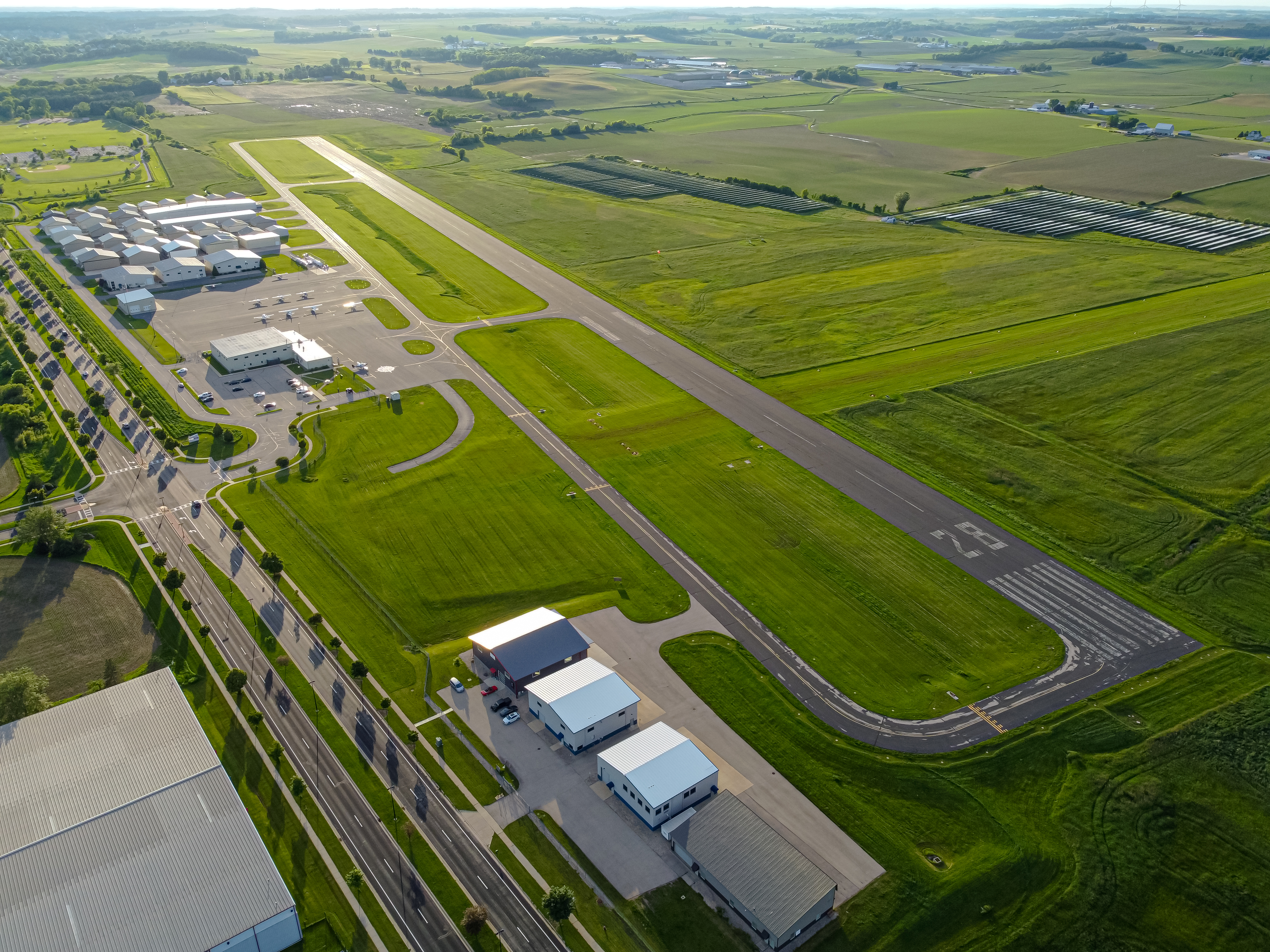

Middleton Municipal Airport – Morey Field covers an area of 258 acres (104 ha) and has two runways:

- 10/28: 4,001 ft × 100 ft (1,220 m × 30 m), surface: asphalt
- 1/19: 1,780 ft × 120 ft (543 m × 37 m), surface: turf

This airport is served by the following instrument approach procedures:

- RNAV (GPS) RWY 10
- RNAV (GPS) RWY 28
- LOC/DME RWY 10
- VOR RWY 28

Note: Special take-off minimums apply.

For the 12-month period ending July 12, 2023, the airport had 40,510 aircraft operations, an average of 111 per day: 62% local general aviation, 32% transient general aviation, 6% air taxi and less than 1% military.

In August 2024, there were 91 aircraft based at this airport: 80 single-engine, 5 multi-engine, 2 jet and 4 helicopter.

== Airlines and destinations ==
=== Cargo ===
| Airlines | Destinations |
|---|---|
| Freight Runners Express | Milwaukee, Wisconsin Dells |

== Ground transportation ==
Public transit service to the airport is provided by Metro Transit.

== See also ==
- List of airports in Wisconsin
