= KMKE =

KMKE may refer to:

- KMKE-LP, a low-power radio station (98.1 FM) licensed to Eureka, California, United States
- Milwaukee Mitchell International Airport (ICAO code KMKE)
