= Middleton Airport =

Middleton Airport may refer to:

- Middleton Field in Evergreen, Alabama;
- Middleton Municipal Airport in Middleton, Wisconsin.
