= Milwaukee Airport Railroad Station =

Railway station in Milwaukee, Wisconsin, US

Milwaukee Airport
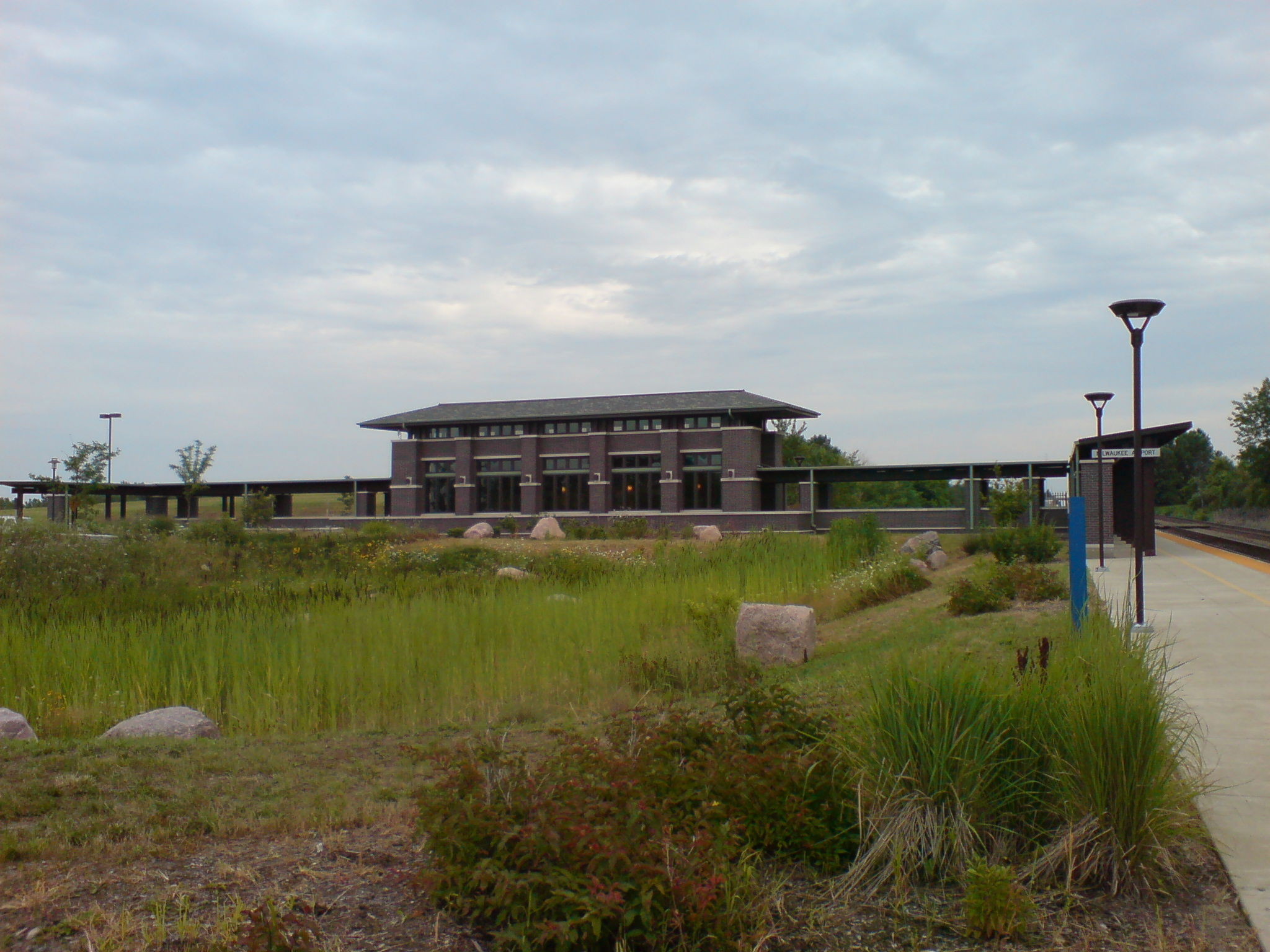
- The station in August 2008

General information
- Location: 5601 South 6th Street; Milwaukee, Wisconsin; United States
- Coordinates: 42°56′26″N 87°55′29″W
- Owner: Wisconsin Department of Transportation
- Line: CPKC C&M Subdivision
- Platforms: 1 side platform
- Tracks: 2
- Connections: Shuttle to air terminal

Construction
- Parking: 300 spaces, paid
- Cycle facilities: Outdoor bicycle parking
- Accessible: Yes

Other information
- Station code: Amtrak: MKA

History
- Opened: January 18, 2005
- Rebuilt: 2012; 2025 (planned)

Passengers
- FY 2025: 123,946 (Amtrak)

Services
Preceding station	Amtrak	Following station
Milwaukee toward St. Paul	Borealis	Sturtevant toward Chicago
Milwaukee Terminus	Hiawatha	Sturtevant toward Chicago
Empire Builder does not stop here
Location

Milwaukee Airport Railroad Station is an Amtrak railway station located near the western edge of Milwaukee Mitchell International Airport in Milwaukee, Wisconsin, United States. It is served by the six daily round trips of the Hiawatha and the single daily round trip of the Borealis with a free shuttle between the station and the airport terminal. The Empire Builder also uses these tracks but does not stop. The station opened on January 18, 2005.

== Service and facilities ==
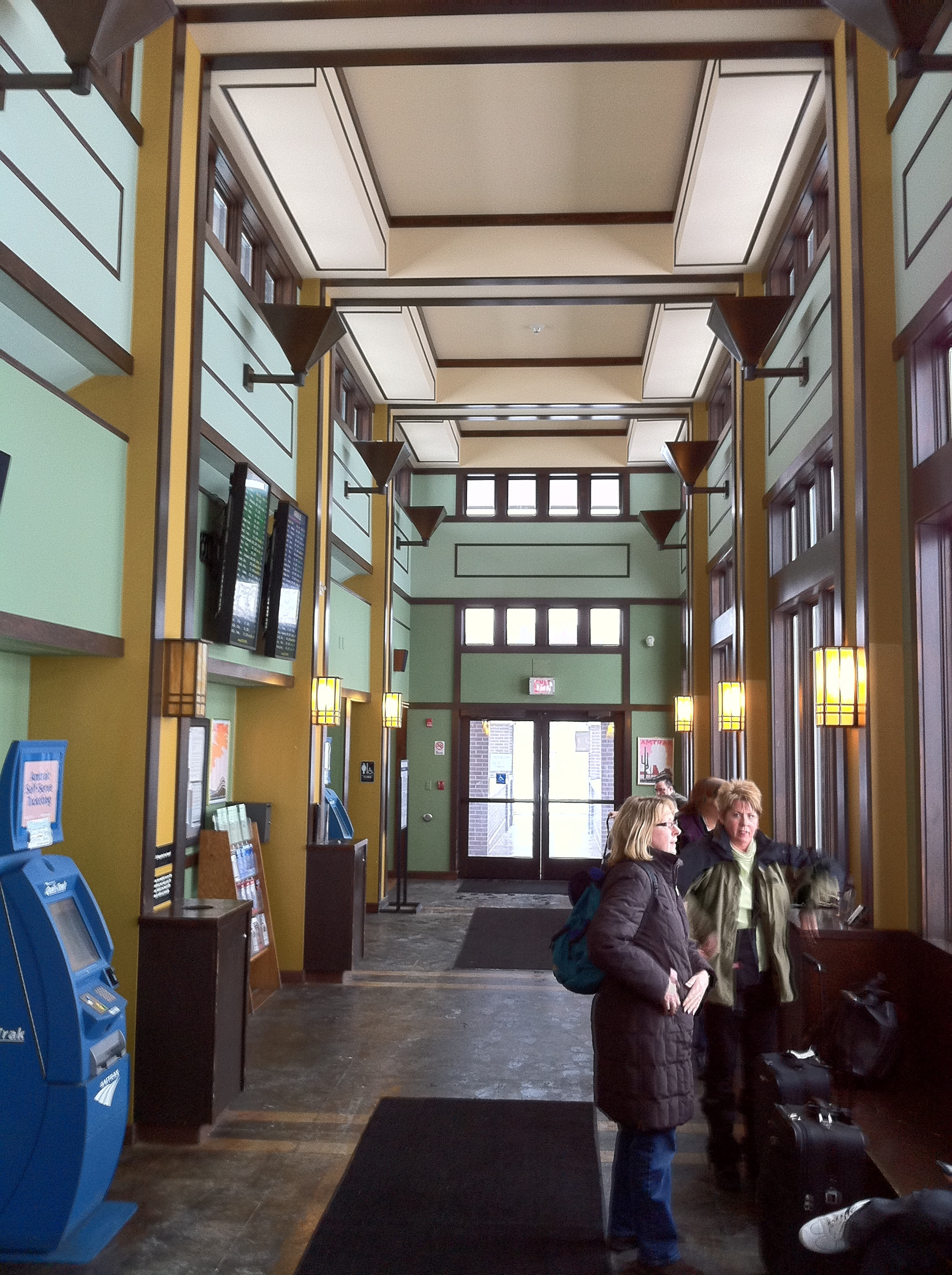
Station interior

The Milwaukee Airport Rail Station's primary functions are to serve as an airport rail link for Milwaukee Mitchell International Airport and to serve as an alternate to the downtown Milwaukee Intermodal Station for residents of the southern portions of the Milwaukee metropolitan area. The station is served by the Amtrak Hiawatha and Borealis trains, and sees fourteen daily arrivals, seven each from Milwaukee and Chicago Union Station. The station is the first stop en route to Chicago, 8 miles (13 km) from Milwaukee with a travel time of about 10 minutes. It is also the third stop en route to downtown Milwaukee, with a travel time along the 78-mile (126 km) section taking one hour and 14 minutes. In Amtrak's fiscal year 2025, the station handled 123,946 passengers.

The 1,600-square-foot (150 m^{2}) station includes a Quik-Trak ticket machine, restrooms, a seating area, and covered walkways to both the drive-up area and the boarding platform. As the station is unstaffed, all tickets from the station need to be purchased online, from the Quik-Trak machine or on the train from a conductor. Passengers needing checked baggage service are advised to use the downtown station. The station parking lot contains 300 spaces and a fee is charged to park. All revenue generated from parking fees is used to finance the station's operating costs. Transportation to and from the airport terminal is provided by the free shuttle buses operated by the airport.

== History ==
The idea of opening an Amtrak station in the vicinity of Mitchell Airport had been discussed since the mid-1970s. The justification for not building the station at the time was based on infrequent Amtrak service and relatively congestion-free access to the airport from the south via I-94 and WI 119. By the late 1990s, a station at the airport was proposed as part of the Midwest Regional Rail Initiative. In June 2001, the Wisconsin Department of Transportation authorized $100,000 to start the preliminary design for the station, with an original opening slated for late 2003.

How to fund construction of the station became an issue following objections from both airport and Milwaukee County officials. Although supported by both airport and local officials, they stated that financing a facility to transport persons primarily away from Milwaukee should not be done with local, but rather state and federal sources. As a result of this sentiment, Senator Herb Kohl requested $5 million for its construction as part of a federal transportation appropriations bill in July, only to see it reduced to $2.5 million in the final bill in December. With an additional $4 million in funding secured by Kohl in February 2003, combined with the $2.5 million previously appropriated, construction of the $6.5 million station could commence.

Groundbreaking for the facility occurred on June 28, 2004. Included in the $6.8 million project budget were funds for the construction of the station and track improvements to reduce delays between Milwaukee and Chicago. State and local economic development officials saw its construction as an opportunity for travelers from the Chicago metropolitan area to use the station as a rail link to reach Milwaukee Mitchell International Airport as an alternative for both Chicago's Midway and O'Hare airports. The station opened for Hiawatha trains on January 18, 2005, as a regular stop along Amtrak's . At the time of its opening, this became only the fourth Amtrak station to have direct service to an airport, after Baltimore, Newark and Burbank.

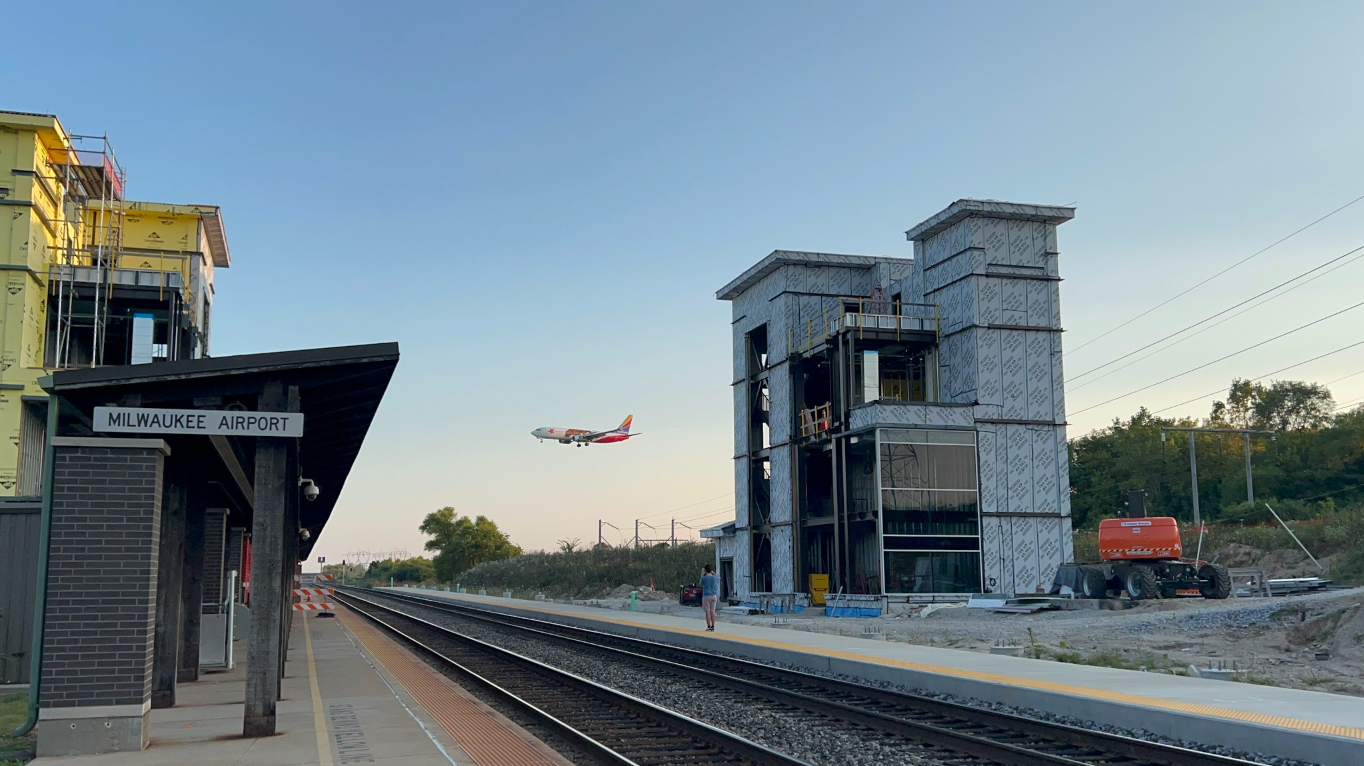
Construction of the footbridge and second platform in September 2025

The station was designed for trains carrying only four coach cars, but service was expanded to five cars by 2009, with a sixth proposed. In 2010, the Wisconsin Department of Transportation was awarded $678,000 in American Recovery and Reinvestment Act funds to double the length of the 400-foot (120 m)-long platform. The work was completed in October 2012. From March 21 to June 29, 2020, the Empire Builder temporarily stopped at Milwaukee Airport and Sturtevant while Hiawatha trains were suspended due to the COVID-19 pandemic.

In February 2019, the Federal Railroad Administration awarded $5 million in Consolidated Rail Infrastructure and Safety Improvements funds to the Wisconsin Department of Transportation for the addition of a second 800-foot (240 m) platform and a footbridge at the station. Construction on the $17.2 million project began in June 2023 and was initially expected to be completed by June 2025. However, the timeline was later revised to Spring 2026.
