= Hiawatha (Amtrak train) =

Amtrak service between Chicago, IL and Milwaukee, WI

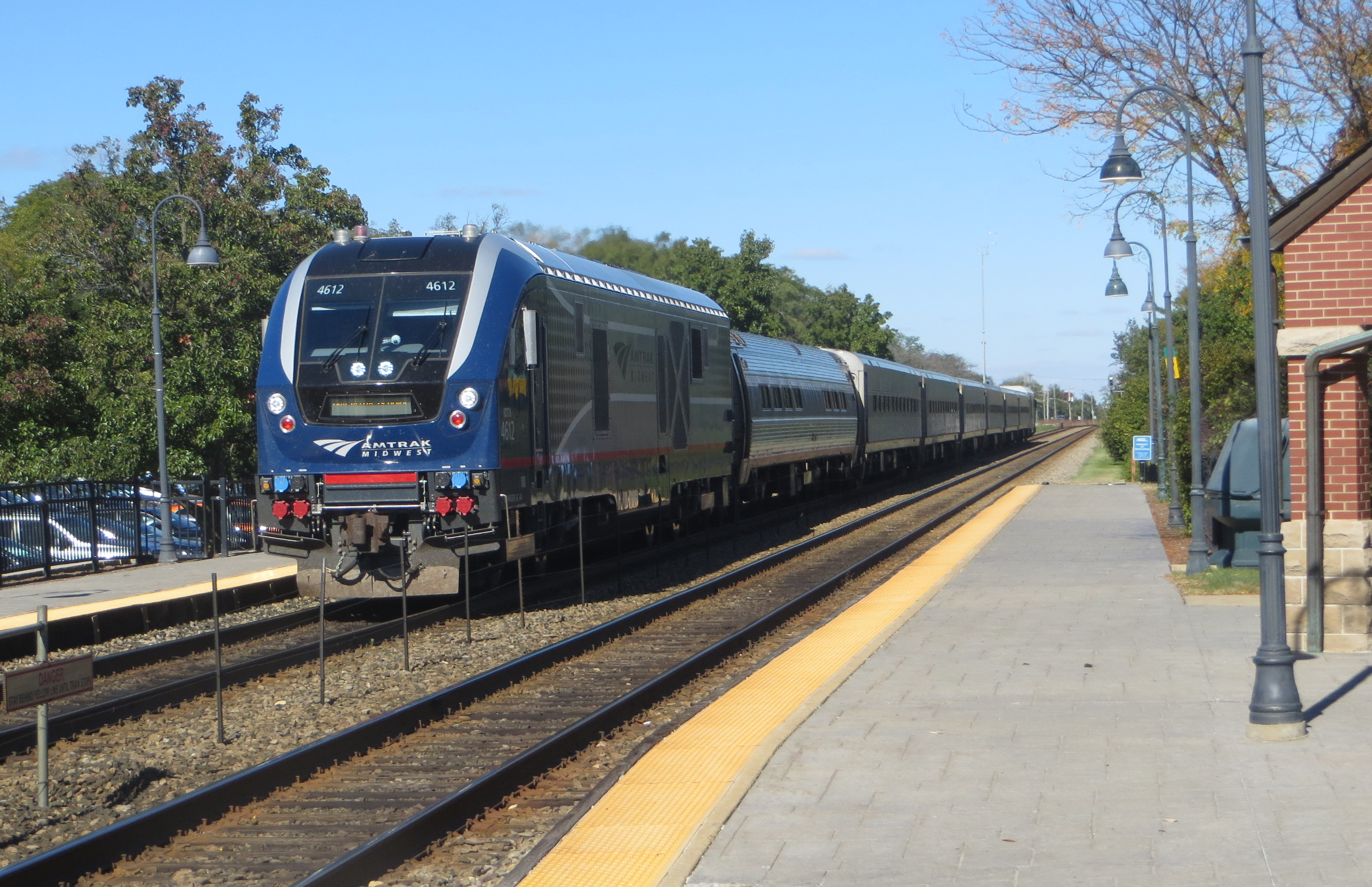
- The Hiawatha at Glenview, October 2018

Overview
- Service type: Inter-city rail
- Locale: Illinois/Wisconsin
- Predecessor: Milwaukee Road corridor trains
- First service: May 1, 1971
- Current operators: Amtrak, in partnership with Illinois and Wisconsin Departments of Transportation
- Annual ridership: 631,990 (FY 25) ▼ -5% (Note: Amtrak's Fiscal Year (FY) runs from October 1 of the prior year to September 30 of the named year.)

Route
- Termini: Milwaukee, Wisconsin; Chicago, Illinois
- Stops: 5
- Distance travelled: 86 miles (138 km)
- Average journey time: 1 hour, 29 minutes
- Service frequency: Six round trips (Mon–Sat); Five round trips (Sun)
- Train number: 329–332, 334–339, 341–344

On-board services
- Class: Coach Class
- Disabled access: All cars, all stations
- Catering facilities: None
- Baggage facilities: Overhead racks, checked baggage available at Chicago and Milwaukee (suspended)

Technical
- Rolling stock: Siemens Charger; Venture coaches
- Track gauge: 4 ft 8 1/2 in (1,435 mm) standard gauge
- Operating speed: 57 mph (92 km/h) (avg.); 79 mph (127 km/h) (top)

Amtrak Hiawatha

The Hiawatha (also called the Hiawatha Service), is an 86-mile (138 km) train route operated by Amtrak between Chicago, Illinois, and Milwaukee, Wisconsin. Twelve to fourteen trains (six round-trips, five on Sunday) run daily between Chicago and Milwaukee, making intermediate stops in Glenview, Illinois; Sturtevant, Wisconsin; and Milwaukee Mitchell International Airport. The line is partially supported by funding from the state governments of Wisconsin and Illinois. The line utilizes the CPKC Railway's C&M Subdivision and Metra's Milwaukee District North Line.

The service carried 636,854 passengers in fiscal year 2023, a 26.9% increase over FY2022. It is Amtrak's seventh-busiest route, and the railroad's busiest line in the Midwest. Revenue during FY2011 totaled $14,953,873, a 6.1% increase over FY2010. Ridership per mile is also very high, exceeded only by the Northeast Regional and the Capitol Corridor. A one-way trip between Milwaukee and Chicago takes about 90 minutes. In the 1930s, the same trip took 75 minutes on the Chicago, Milwaukee, St. Paul and Pacific Railroad's Hiawatha. In 2014, free Wi-Fi service was added to the Hiawatha. The service is especially popular with fans attending games involving baseball's Brewers–Cubs rivalry using mass transit, with trains before and after games at either American Family Field or Wrigley Field often filled to capacity.

The route is augmented by Amtrak Thruway routes connecting Madison, Janesville, and Rockford with Chicago.

== History ==
=== Milwaukee Road ===
Hiawatha logo from the Milwaukee Road days.

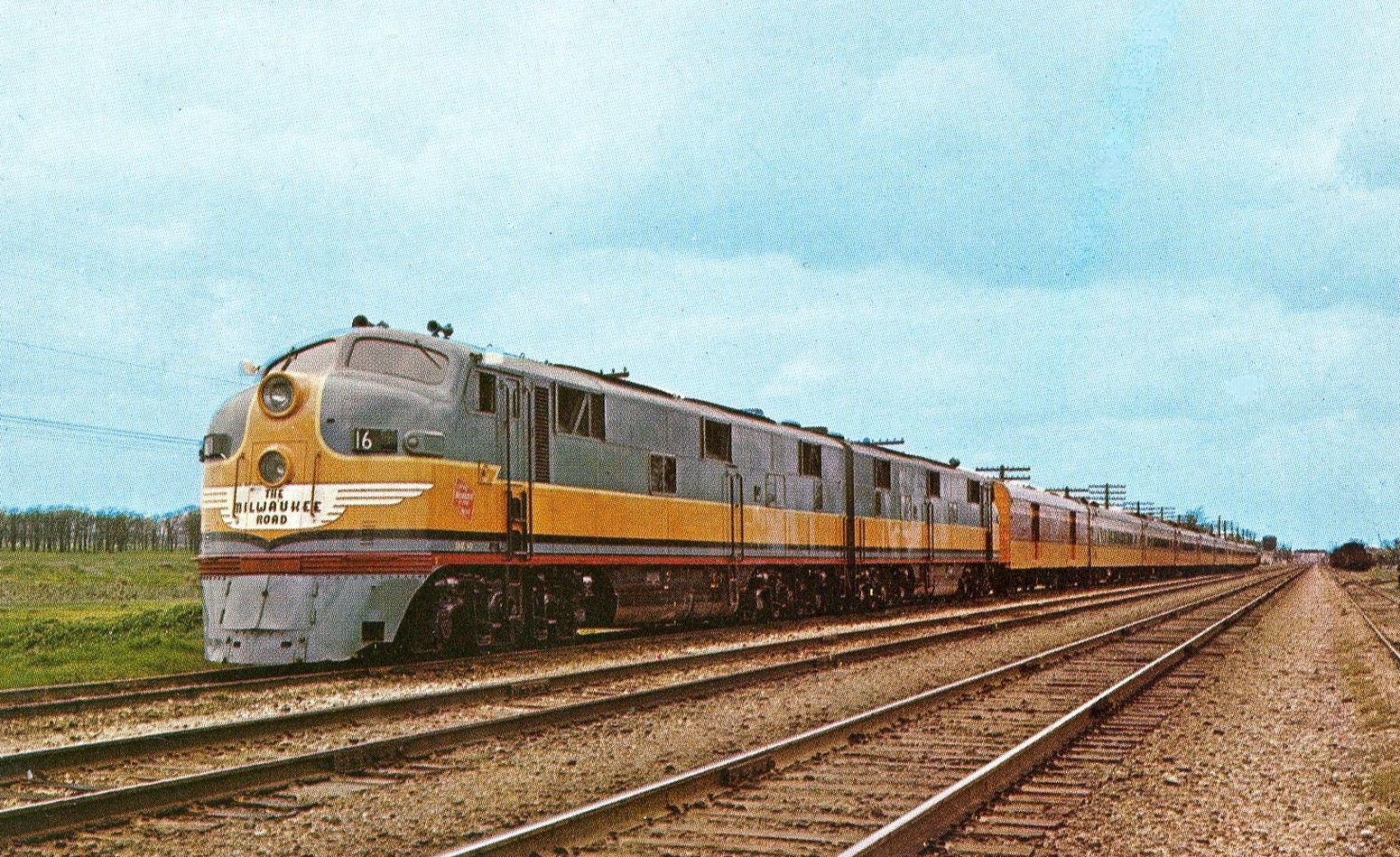
An "Afternoon Hiawatha" depicted on a postcard (c. 1956-1963).

Historically, the Hiawathas were operated by the Chicago, Milwaukee, St. Paul and Pacific Railroad (also known as the "Milwaukee Road"), and initially traveled from Chicago to the Twin Cities. The first Hiawatha trains ran in 1935. By 1948, five routes carried the Hiawatha name: Chicago–Minneapolis; Chicago–Omaha; Chicago–Wausau–Minocqua; Chicago–Ontanogan; and Chicago-Minneapolis-Seattle.

The Hiawathas were among the world's fastest trains in the 1930s and 1940s, and these trains reached some of their peak speeds on this stretch, directly competing with trains from the Chicago and North Western Railway which ran on roughly parallel tracks. A 90-minute non-stop service between Chicago and Milwaukee was first introduced in the mid-1930s, and this later fell to 75 minutes for several years. A self-imposed 100 mph (161 km/h) speed limit was routinely exceeded by locomotive engineers, until the Interstate Commerce Commission rules imposed a stricter limit of 90 mph (145 km/h) in the early 1950s. The train slowed to a schedule of 80 minutes, although an added stop in Glenview also contributed to a longer travel time. Ultimately, the speed limit fell to 79 mph (127 km/h) in 1968 because of signaling changes, and the scheduled duration went back to 90 minutes end-to-end.

=== Amtrak ===
Under Amtrak, which assumed control of most intercity passenger rail service in the United States on May 1, 1971, the Hiawatha name survived in two forms. The first was a Chicago–Milwaukee–Minneapolis service, known simply as the Hiawatha. This would be renamed the Twin Cities Hiawatha, then extended to Seattle and renamed the North Coast Hiawatha. This service ended in 1979.

The second was a Chicago–Milwaukee corridor train known as the Hiawatha Service (as opposed to Hiawatha). Although Amtrak had retained Chicago–Milwaukee service during the transition, it did not name these trains until October 29, 1972. At this time both Hiawatha and Hiawatha Service could be found on the same timetable. On June 15, 1976, Amtrak introduced Turboliners to the route and the name Hiawatha Service left the timetable, not to return until 1989. The Chicago–Milwaukee trains were known simply as "Turboliners" (as were comparable trains on the Chicago–Detroit and Chicago – St. Louis corridors) until October 26, 1980, when Amtrak introduced individual names for each of the trains: The Badger, the LaSalle, the Nicollet, and the Radisson. This practice ended on October 29, 1989, when the name Hiawatha Service returned as an umbrella term for all Chicago–Milwaukee service.

A resurfacing project on Interstate 94 led to a three-month trial of service west of Milwaukee to Watertown, Wisconsin beginning on April 13, 1998. Intermediate stops included Wauwatosa, Elm Grove, Pewaukee, and Oconomowoc. Amtrak extended four of the six daily Hiawathas over the route. The Canadian Pacific Railway, which owned the tracks through its American subsidiary Soo Line Railroad, estimated that the route would require between $15–33 million in capital investment before it could host the extended service permanently. Money was not forthcoming and service ended July 11. The three-month trial cost $1.4 million and carried 32,000 passengers.

Between 2000 and 2001, Amtrak considered extending one Hiawatha round-trip 70 miles (113 km) north from Milwaukee to Fond du Lac, Wisconsin. Potential stops included Elm Grove, Brookfield, Slinger, and Lomira. Travel time would be nearly two hours. Amtrak hoped to attract mail and express business along the route as part of its Network Growth Strategy, similar to the short-lived Lake Country Limited. Amtrak abandoned the idea in September 2001.

In 2005, another station opened on the line, the Milwaukee Airport Railroad Station at Milwaukee Mitchell International Airport. The expansion was intended to facilitate travel to and from the airport, with shuttles running between the station and the main terminal. The new station also gave residents on the south side of Milwaukee easier access to the service, along with an alternative to the central station in downtown, which is now fully accessible after completion of the Marquette Interchange. The station was primarily funded and is maintained by the Wisconsin Department of Transportation.

It is proposed that the Hiawatha, along with the Empire Builder, would shift one stop north to North Glenview in Glenview, Illinois. This move would eliminate lengthy stops which block traffic on Glenview Road. This move would involve reconstruction of the North Glenview station to handle the additional traffic, and depends on commitments from Glenview, the Illinois General Assembly, and Metra.

The route is coextensive with the far southern leg of the Empire Builder, Amtrak's long-distance service from Chicago to the Pacific Northwest. The Empire Builder stops at Glenview and Milwaukee, but normally does so in both cases only to receive passengers northbound and discharge passengers southbound.

==== COVID-19 pandemic ====
The Hiawatha was reduced to four daily round trips on March 19, 2020, and a single round trip two days later, due to the COVID-19 pandemic. The Empire Builder added stops at Sturtevant and Milwaukee Airport on the 21st, and temporarily allowed local travel between Chicago and Milwaukee. That single round trip was suspended on April 24, 2020, and replaced with an Amtrak Thruway bus (an extension of the existing Green Bay–Milwaukee bus route) making the same stops.

The Hiawatha returned on June 1, 2020, with a single round trip: a morning departure to Chicago and an evening return to Milwaukee. Three additional daily round trips and two additional weekend round trips returned on June 29. The Hiawatha had long run with a mix of reserved and unreserved seating, but Amtrak temporarily required reservations for passengers without multi-ride tickets in order to maintain social distancing. Amtrak also required facial coverings and stopped accepting cash. The Empire Builder ceased making the additional stops on June 29. On May 23, 2021, Hiawatha Service and the Milwaukee–Green Bay Thruway route returned to their full pre-pandemic schedules.

In November 2023, Amtrak ceased offering monthly passes for the Hiawatha, instead selling 10-ride passes. The change significantly increased the cost for daily commuters. In December 2023, Amtrak reinstated the monthly pass for riders at a higher cost than previous.

In October 2024, the state was awarded a $72.8 million federal grant to build a freight bypass track through Muskego Yard in Milwaukee, which will reduce freight movements though the Milwaukee station. CPKC had agreed to allow an eighth Hiawatha round trip once the bypass was funded.

==== Corridor names ====
This table shows the names given to trains which operated over the Chicago–Milwaukee corridor under Amtrak. It excludes long-distance trains such as the Empire Builder and North Coast Hiawatha whose local stopping patterns were restricted. The Abraham Lincoln and Prairie State were Chicago–St. Louis services which Amtrak extended through Chicago to the north in the early 1970s.

1971	1972	1973	1975	1976	1980	1984	1985	1989	Present
Abraham Lincoln									
Prairie State									
	Hiawatha Service							Hiawatha Service	
			Turboliner						
					LaSalle				
					Marquette				
					Nicollet				
					Radisson				
						Badger			
						Encore			

== Ridership ==
Traffic by Fiscal Year
Fiscal Year	Ridership	%±	Ticket Revenue	%±	Ref.
2007	595,336	–	$10,230,272	–	
2008	749,659	▲25.92%	$13,138,765	▲28.43%	
2009	738,231	▼1.52%	$13,300,511	▲1.23%	
2010	783,060	▲6.07%	$14,092,803	▲5.96%	
2011	819,493	▲4.65%	$14,953,873	▲6.11%	
2012	838,355	▲2.30%	$15,963,261	▲6.75%	
2013	778,469	▼7.14%	$16,287,184	▲2.03%	(Note: The 2013 and subsequent numbers have been adjusted to account for multi-ride tickets.)
2014	799,638	▲2.72%	$16,794,044	▲3.10%	
2015	799,271	▼0.05%			
2016	807,720	▲1.06%			
2017	829,000	▲2.63%			
2018	844,396	▲1.86%			
2019	882,189	▲4.48%			
2020	403,112	▼54.3%			
2021	241,639	▼40.1%			
2022	501,925	▲107.7%			
2023	636,854	▲26.9%			
2024	665,279	▲4.5%	$16,700,000	--	
2025	631,990	▼5.0%			

View source data.

Due primarily to the route's popularity, its northern terminus, Milwaukee Intermodal Station, is Amtrak's 18th-busiest station nationwide and second-busiest in the Midwest.

== Equipment ==
Three trainsets are required to operate the service. The usual Hiawatha train sets are formed of one Siemens SC-44 locomotive on the southward end, an EMD F40PH-derived Non-Powered Control Unit/NPCU ("cabbage" car) on the northward end for push-pull operation, and six Horizon 68-seat coaches. One car at the rear end in the direction of travel is designated a "quiet" car with limitations placed on cell phone usage and loud conversations. During winter months, an Amfleet coach is normally used on each end in lieu of a Horizon coach to serve as quiet cars.

In August 2019, the Federal Railroad Administration (FRA) awarded WisDOT up to $25.2 million to purchase six new coaches and three new cab cars for the route, allowing the replacement of the NPCUs. The new equipment was expected to enter service in 2022, but as of August 2023, reliability issues with the NPCUs combined with the new equipment not yet having been assigned to the route resulted in the suspension of checked baggage and trainside bicycle service.

All Horizon cars were removed from service in late March 2025 due to corrosion issues, resulting in several daily trips being replaced with buses. Trips using other equipment (such as the Siemens Venture trainsets) continued to run. Service was restored in early April. As of April 2025, Amtrak plans to lease one set of three Bombardier BiLevel coaches and one locomotive from Metro Transit – previously used for the now-defunct Northstar Line – for temporary use on the Hiawatha. This lease was approved on May 15, 2025.

=== Talgo trainsets ===
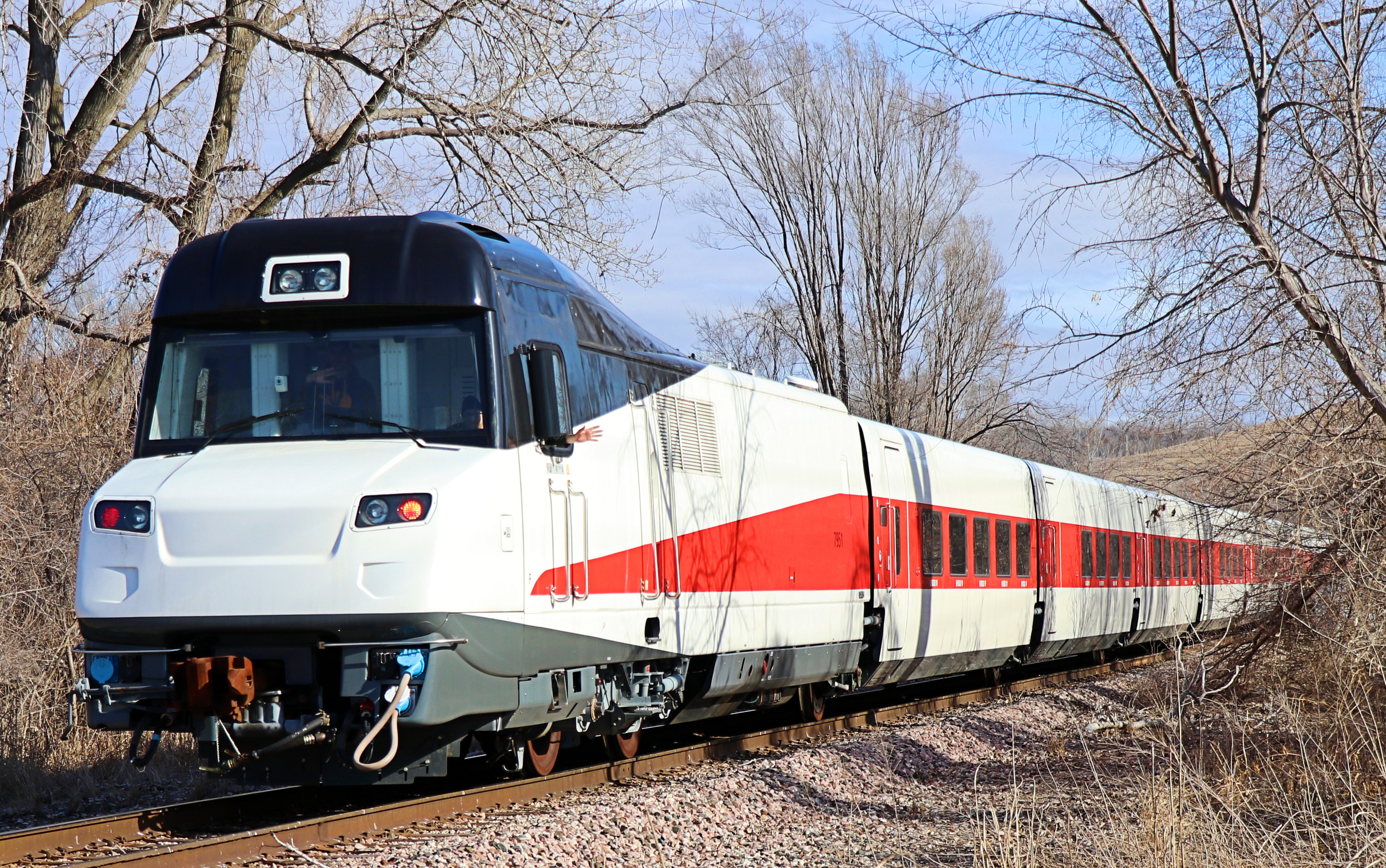
One of the Talgo trainsets originally built for the Hiawatha

On July 17, 2009, the State of Wisconsin announced it would purchase two new train sets from Spanish manufacturer Talgo in preparation for the enhanced-speed service that received funding in early 2010. However, Governor Scott Walker rejected the federal funding and cancelled the project. Talgo opened a manufacturing plant in Milwaukee to construct the trainsets for the Hiawatha, and the company hoped the plant would also build trains for future high-speed lines in the region.

The two sets built were stored in the former Talgo plant until May 2014, when Amtrak moved them to Beech Grove Shops pending their possible use on other Amtrak routes. The unpowered tilting trainsets were 14 cars long including a cab car, eleven coaches (five of which have restrooms), one bistro car, and one end car including a bicycle rack. The cars had a red-and-white livery in homage to the University of Wisconsin. The trains would have initially been pulled by the same GE Genesis locomotives used at the time, which have a top speed of 110 mph (180 km/h). In 2022, the two trainsets were sold to Nigeria for use on the Lagos Rail Mass Transit.

== Proposed extensions ==
In 2021, Amtrak proposed adding three new Hiawatha round trips by 2035. This would bring the total frequency between Chicago and Milwaukee to ten daily round trips. All trips would extend beyond Milwaukee, with four daily trains to Madison, three to Saint Paul, and three to Green Bay. In December 2023, the FRA accepted the Hiawatha route into its Corridor Identification and Development Program. The move grants $500,000 toward studying additional frequency and prioritizes the corridor for future federal funding under the Infrastructure Investment and Jobs Act passed in November 2021.

=== Madison ===
In 2009, Wisconsin applied for funding from an $8 billion pool allocated for rail projects under the American Recovery and Reinvestment Act, and the Chicago–Milwaukee–Madison–Minneapolis/St. Paul corridor was allocated $823 million. $810 million of that was to support extending Amtrak services to Madison, which had not seen direct intercity service since 1971. Another $12 million would have been used to upgrade the line between Chicago and Milwaukee, and an additional $600,000 was granted to study future alignments to the Twin Cities.

The Madison extension was initially planned to include stops in Brookfield, Oconomowoc, and Watertown, but Oconomowoc and Brookfield were reluctant to move forward with station planning due to cost concerns. The Wisconsin Department of Transportation (WisDOT) dropped Oconomowoc from the planned route in August 2010, and Brookfield was waiting to see the outcome of elections in November before making a decision on whether to build a station. The nearby cities of Hartland and Wauwatosa had expressed interest in hosting stations. The extension was expected to begin service by 2013.

The project became a political issue in the 2010 Wisconsin gubernatorial election. Republican candidate Scott Walker promised he would stop the project and return the money the state received if elected.

At the end of October 2010, Wisconsin governor Jim Doyle and the federal government signed an agreement that bound the state to spend the federal funds granted to construct the route, regardless of the results of the 2010 gubernatorial election. On November 4, two days after Scott Walker won the gubernatorial election, however, Doyle ordered work on the line to be temporarily halted, and on November 9 said that he planned to leave the choice of whether or not to operate the train to Walker. On December 9, 2010, U.S. Transportation Secretary Ray LaHood announced that much of the $810 million that Wisconsin was supposed to get would be redistributed to other states, including California, Florida, and Washington.

The Madison extension was included in the 2022 Amtrak Connects Us initiative, with the goal of establishing service by 2035. An extension to Madison was cited by the US Department of Transportation as “critical to operational viability of the Core Express corridor between Chicago and Minneapolis–St. Paul” and that it should be “included on any mainline route alignment". The City of Madison subsequently renewed work on selecting a location for a passenger station, culminating in publication of a study in November 2025 that recommended a site along Lake Monona.

The Madison extension project was eventually named Hiawatha West and scoped to include an extension of two daily Hiawatha round trips west of Milwaukee with stops in Pewaukee, Watertown, and Madison.

In October 2026, the Federal Railroad Administration awarded a $218 million Consolidated Rail Infrastructure and Safety Improvement grant to WisDOT for final design and construction of the Hiawatha West project, with service to begin potentially in 2030. The state and local municipalities are providing 20% in matching funds. The monies will fund new stations and improvements to track, bridges, and crossings, allowing passenger trains to operate at 59 mph (95 km/h) on the Wisconsin and Southern Railroad track between Watertown and Madison.

=== Twin Cities ===
There had long been proposals to extend one or more Hiawatha trips from Milwaukee to Minneapolis–Saint Paul, Minnesota, which would double service frequency on the Twin Cities–Milwaukee–Chicago (TCMC) corridor.

A 2015 feasibility report by Amtrak looked at extending one round trip as a "second train" along the route of the Empire Builder through La Crosse. Annual ridership was forecast between 117,800 and 155,500 if the service ended at Saint Paul Union Depot, and higher if it extended to Target Field, Fridley, or St. Cloud.

The total cost to extend one round trip to Saint Paul was placed at $53 million. In May 2020, a $12.6 million federal grant was awarded to offset the first three years of operations. A $31.8 million grant followed in September 2020 for final design work and construction. Amtrak provided $5 million in matching funds, Wisconsin $6.2 million, and Minnesota promised $10 million.

In its 2020–2035 expansion vision, Amtrak proposed extending three Hiawatha trips from Milwaukee to the Twin Cities. One would complement the Empire Builder, while two would take a new route with stops in Camp Douglas, Eau Claire, Menomonie, and Hudson. The Milwaukee–Saint Paul trip time is estimated at 6 hours 45 minutes.

On May 21, 2024, Amtrak's new Borealis train offering one round-trip per day between Chicago and Minneapolis–Saint Paul was inaugurated. It complements the long-distance Empire Builder in providing additional frequency on the corridor.

=== Green Bay ===
Amtrak has proposed extending three Hiawatha trips from Milwaukee to Green Bay by 2035, with stops in Fond du Lac, Oshkosh, and Appleton. The Milwaukee–Green Bay trip time is estimated at 2 hours 50 minutes.

== Station stops ==
State	Town/City	Station	Connections
Illinois	Chicago	Chicago Union Station	Amtrak (long-distance): California Zephyr, Cardinal, City of New Orleans, Floridian, Empire Builder, Lake Shore Limited, Southwest Chief, Texas Eagle; Amtrak (intercity): Blue Water, Borealis, Illini and Saluki, Illinois Zephyr and Carl Sandburg, Lincoln Service, Pere Marquette, Wolverine; Metra: BNSF, Heritage Corridor, Milwaukee District North, Milwaukee District West, North Central Service, SouthWest Service; Chicago "L": Blue (at Clinton) Brown Orange Pink Purple (at Quincy); Local buses: CTA, Pace; Intercity buses: Amtrak Thruway, Greyhound, Megabus
Illinois	Glenview	Glenview	Amtrak: Borealis, Empire Builder; Metra: Milwaukee District North; Pace
Wisconsin	Sturtevant	Sturtevant	Amtrak: Borealis; Ryde
Wisconsin	Milwaukee	Milwaukee Airport	Amtrak: Borealis; Shuttle to Milwaukee Mitchell International Airport
Wisconsin	Milwaukee	Milwaukee	Amtrak: Borealis, Empire Builder; The Hop; Milwaukee County Transit System; Intercity buses: Greyhound, Wisconsin Coach Lines, Jefferson Lines, Lamers Bus Lines, Indian Trails, Megabus

== See also ==
- Midwest Regional Rail Initiative
- The Song of Hiawatha, 1855 poem by Henry Wadsworth Longfellow, original namesake of the Hiawatha trains
