= Renaissance Books =

American bookstore in Milwaukee, Wisconsin, United States

Coordinates: 42.9478°N 87.9023°W

Renaissance Books (Former Main Building)
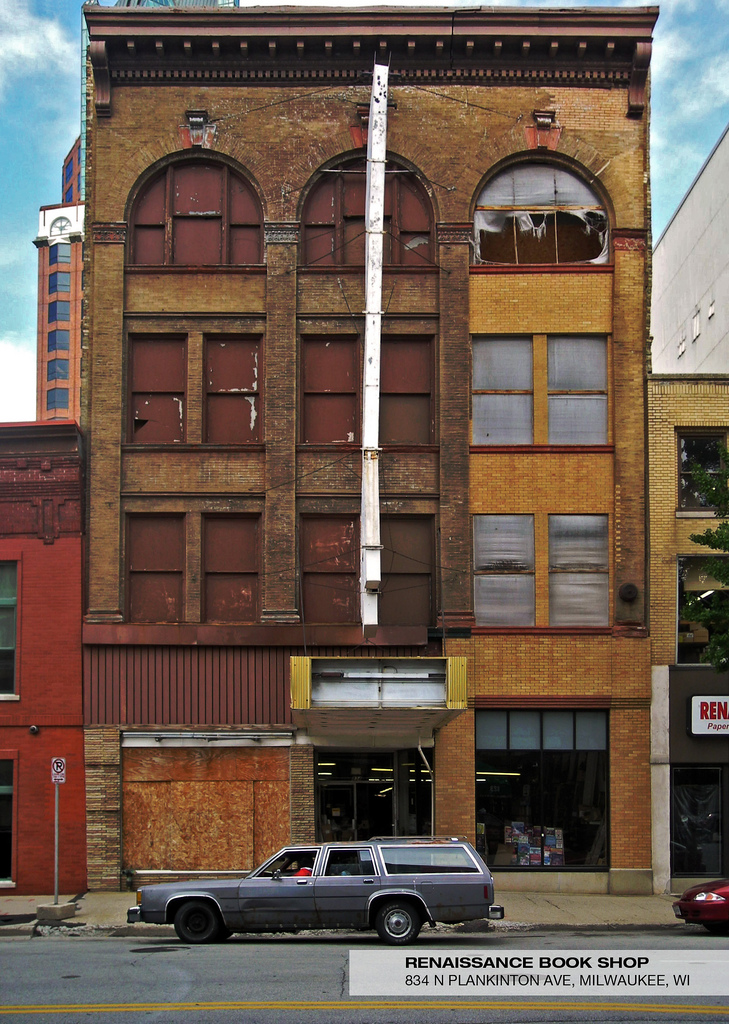

General information
- Location: Downtown Milwaukee, Wisconsin, United States
- Owner: Tim Gokhman (since 2016)

Technical details
- Floor count: 5

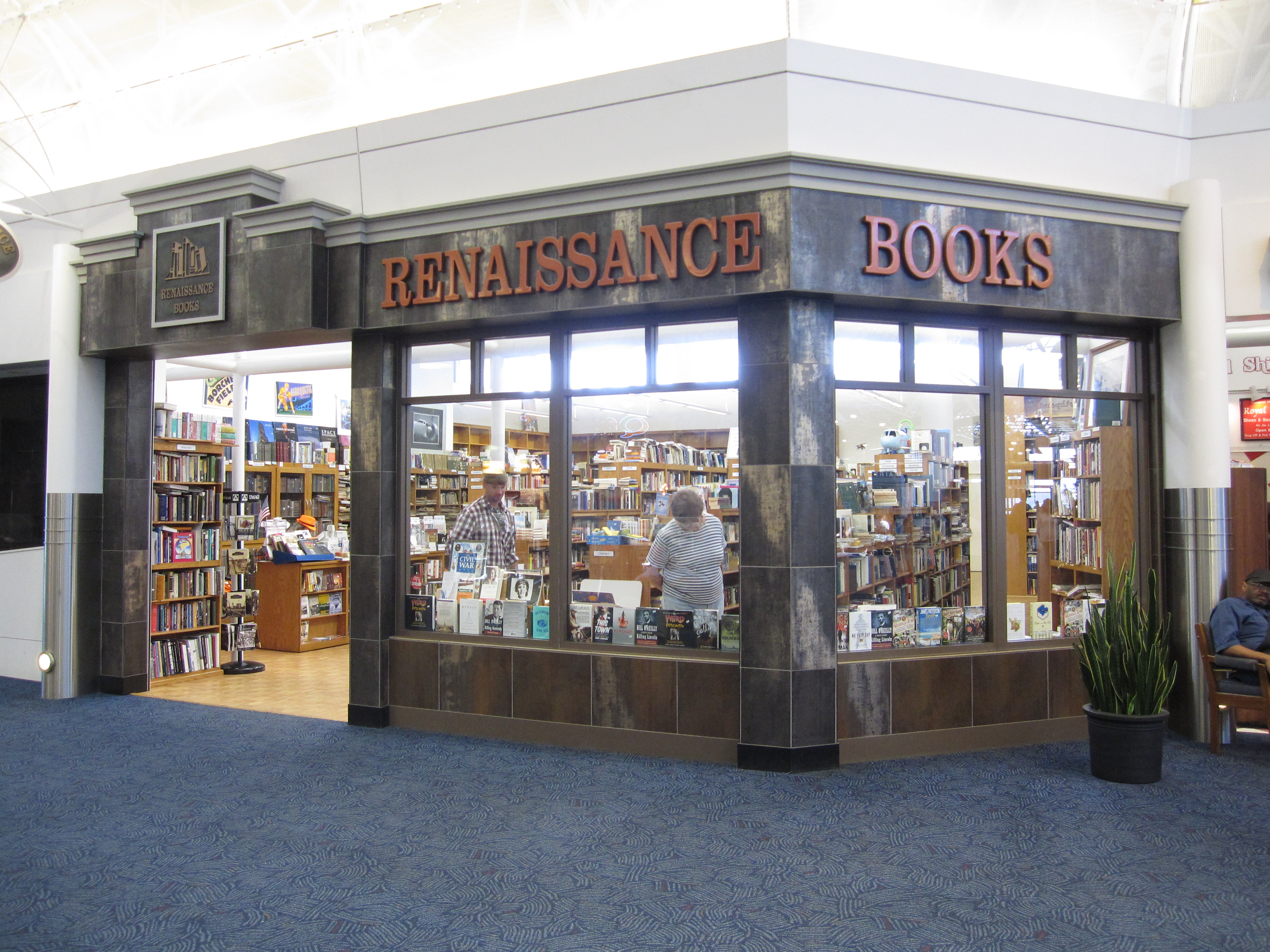
Renaissance Books location in Milwaukee Mitchell International Airport; Milwaukee, WI.

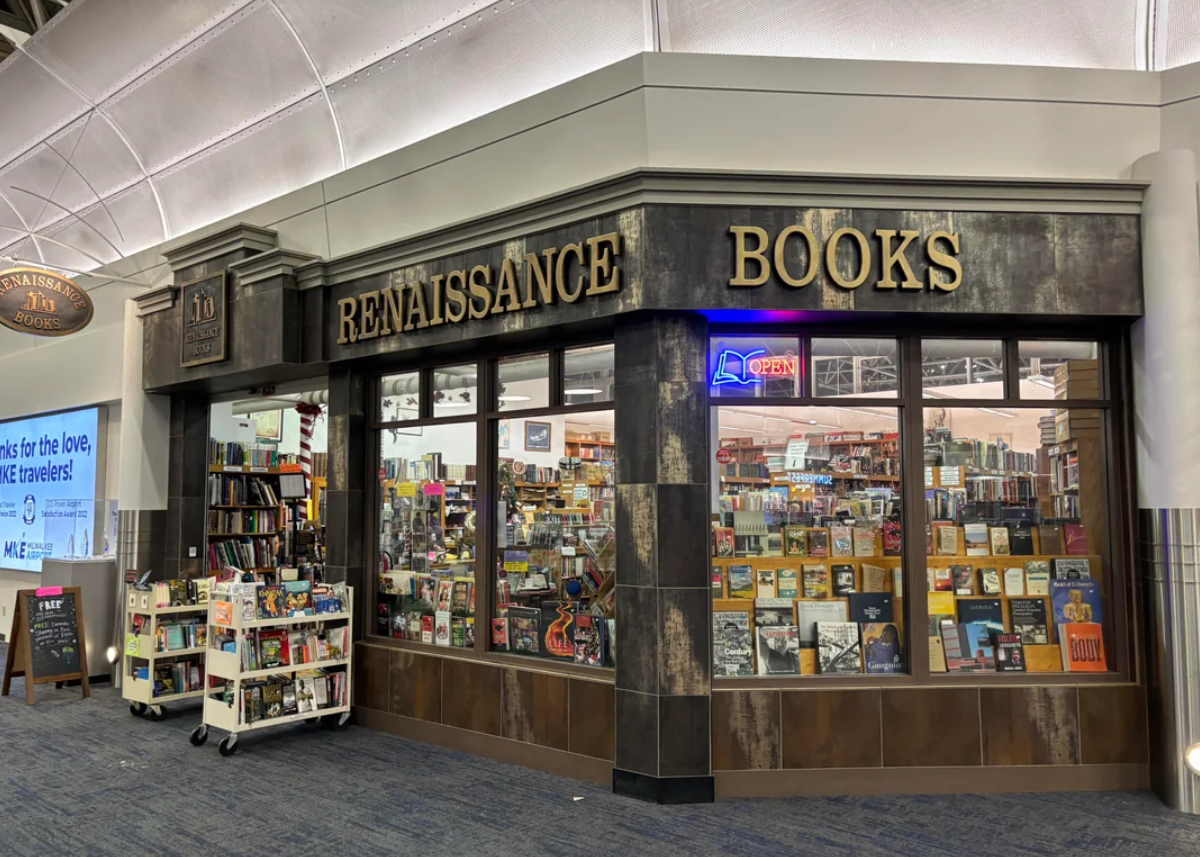
Renaissance Books in 2025.

Renaissance Books is a large independent bookstore originally located in downtown Milwaukee, Wisconsin, specializing in used books. Founded in the 1950s by George John and Erwin Just, it was owned by Robert John, George's younger brother, and now owned by Alex John, George's grandson.

The store's former main building (a former furniture warehouse) was five stories high (plus the two-story building next door and another down the block) housing somewhere from 350,000 to 600,000 volumes. The New York Times described it as "like a book collector’s attic, with boxes of used books lining the floor of this century-old former furniture store. But it’s more organized than it looks, with about a half-million books parceled among dozens of categories ('animal husbandry' 'theater practices and problems')". The local Milwaukee Journal Sentinel described it as, "bursting at the seams with used books... easy to get lost among the mazelike shelves."

== Airport branch ==
Renaissance Books operates a branch at Milwaukee's Milwaukee Mitchell International Airport, which opened in 1979. With strong aviation, history, cooking and genre fiction sections, plus rare books, it was the world's first used book store in an airport. It holds about 60,000 volumes; in a recent The New York Times article, it was praised for its "quirkiness", with one customer saying, "They are totally not what people think of with an airport bookstore. They are kind of funky and it is a very Milwaukee thing."

== "Eyesore" controversy ==
In June 2011 the Journal Sentinel ran an article in its Business section headlined "City, businesses bemoan bookstore eyesore" which described the downtown location as "the eyesore on an otherwise attractive block.... part bookstore, part dustbin" and quoted nearby business owners as condemning the property as a blight on their neighborhood. The store was contrasted to the airport location, which it conceded "is one of the terminal's most popular features. The place is clean, well-lighted and attractive". The article contained speculation that owner John's motivations ranged from active perversity to "gaming the system" to a simple inability to perceive that clutter offends other people. In 2011, the city of Milwaukee closed down the store because of structural concerns about the building.

In November 2015, the city ordered John to demolish the downtown building because of unsafe structural conditions dating back to the early 20th century.

In May 2016, it was reported that the property had been sold to Milwaukee real estate developer Tim Gokhman. Gokhman said he would have an engineering study done to determine if the building could be saved. It was unclear what happened to the books which had been housed in the shuttered building(s). As of 2017, it is reported that the books are still there.

== Other branches ==
In November 2012, it was reported that Renaissance Books would open a branch downtown at the nearby The Shops of Grand Avenue retail mall. In October 2018, it was reported that the Grand Avenue branch was closing down and moving to Southridge Mall on the south side of Milwaukee County. The new store opened on Black Friday of 2018 under the management of "Ink" Lowrey, a second-generation Renaissance employee.

In late 2024, ownership shifted within the company; Alexander John began operating the main Milwaukee branch at Mitchell International Airport, while Robert John would maintain ownership and management of the Southridge Mall location under Renaissance Books. Both of the John family members still operate together to this day. The stores also support local businesses, and have a program that allows local bands to offer vinyl and CD's of their music for use in the store as free advertisement.
