= Wisconsin Highway 38 =

State highway in Wisconsin, United States

State Trunk Highway 38
- WIS 38 highlighted in red

Route information
- Maintained by WisDOT
- Length: 25.33 mi (40.76 km)

Major junctions
- South end: WIS 32 / LMCT in Racine
- WIS 31 in Mount Pleasant; WIS 100 in Oak Creek; WIS 119 in Milwaukee; I-43 / I-94 in Milwaukee
- North end: WIS 59 in Milwaukee

Location
- Country: United States
- State: Wisconsin
- Counties: Racine, Milwaukee

Highway system
- Wisconsin State Trunk Highway System; Interstate; US; State; Scenic; Rustic
← WIS 37	→ I-39

State Trunk Highway 38 (often called Highway 38, STH-38 or WIS 38) is a 25.33-mile (40.76 km) state highway in Racine and Milwaukee counties in the US state of Wisconsin that is a north–south route from downtown Racine in the south to downtown Milwaukee in the north.

== Route description ==
In Racine County, WIS 38 begins near the lake front at the corner of Main Street (also known as Wisconsin Highway 32) and State Street in Racine. WIS 38 turns to the northwest at the intersection of State and Memorial Drive, becoming Northwestern Avenue. Just outside the town of Franksville, WIS 38 turns north until it reaches County Trunk Highway G at Six Mile Road. Turning west, it cuts over to Howell Avenue near Husher.

In Milwaukee County, most of WIS 38 is known as South Howell Avenue, and runs parallel to Interstate 41/Interstate 94 (I-41/I-94). Just north of Howard Avenue, WIS 38 becomes South Chase Avenue, which winds across I-41/I-94 to intersect with South 6th Street. WIS 38 ends at the intersection of 6th and National Avenue (also known as Wisconsin Highway 59). South 6th Street continues north across a viaduct into downtown Milwaukee.

Landmarks along the highway include:

- Milwaukee Mitchell International Airport, Milwaukee] (largest airport in Wisconsin)
- Quarry Lake County Park, Racine (an old rock quarry converted into a "swimming hole")
- Charles A. Wustum Museum of Fine Arts, Racine (former home of Charles Wustum turned into an art museum)
- Case International Harvester world headquarters, Racine (manufacturer of agricultural and farming equipment)

== Future ==
The section of WIS 38 between Oakwood Road in Oak Creek and Northwestern Avenue near Franksville is currently in the developmental phase for complete reconstruction and relocation. the Wisconsin Department of Transportation has listed several alternatives for rerouting the highway. All of the alternatives would occur in Racine County, and would involve the bypassing of the existing stretch between Five Mile Road (County Trunk Highway G) and Northwestern Avenue (County Trunk Highway K).

== Major intersections ==
County	Location	mi	km	Destinations	Notes
Racine	Racine	0.00	0.00	WIS 32 / LMCT (Main Street) – Caledonia, Oak Creek, Milwaukee, Mount Pleasant, Kenosha, Pleasant Prairie, Chicago; State Street east	Roadway continues as State Street; southern terminus
Racine	Mount Pleasant	3.40	5.47	WIS 31 (Ole Davidson Road) – Milwaukee, Kenosha, Waukegan	
Milwaukee	Oak Creek	14.68	23.63	WIS 100 (Ryan Road) – Franklin, Hales Corners, West Allis	
Milwaukee	Milwaukee	19.93	32.07	WIS 119 – Milwaukee Mitchell International Airport	Partial interchange
Milwaukee	Milwaukee	23.73	38.19	I-43 / I-94 north – West Allis, Glendale, Green Bay	Northbound entrance and southbound exit only
Milwaukee	Milwaukee	25.33	40.76	WIS 59 (West National Avenue) – West Allis, New Berlin, Waukesha; South 6th Street north – Downtown Milwaukee	Roadway continues as 6th Street; northern terminus
1.000 mi = 1.609 km; 1.000 km = 0.621 mi: Incomplete access
