= Husher, Wisconsin =

Coordinates: 42°48′51″N 87°53′40″W

Husher (also Hisher, Hoosier) is a former unincorporated community located within the Village of Caledonia, in Racine County, Wisconsin, United States.
It is generally known as the area extending in all directions between 1/2 mile to 1 mile from the intersection of Wisconsin Highway 38 and Nicholson Road.
This intersection is two miles south of the Racine/Milwaukee County line.

The population of Husher is unconfirmed, as no census has been taken for the community.

== History ==
Historical legend states this area was named after Hoosier Creek, which runs through the area. Hoosier was spelled phonetically, and "Husher" was born.
