= Sturtevant station =

Amtrak railroad station in Sturtevant, Wisconsin

Sturtevant, WI
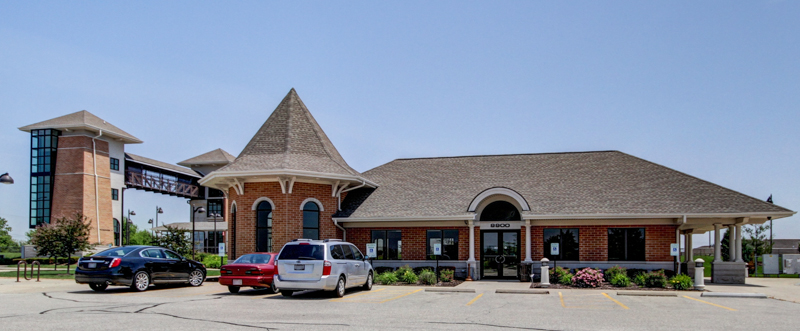
- Sturtevant station, June 2014

General information
- Location: 9900 East Exploration Court; Sturtevant, Wisconsin; United States
- Coordinates: 42°43′06″N 87°54′22″W
- Owner: Village of Sturtevant
- Line: CPKC C&M Subdivision
- Platforms: 2 side platforms
- Tracks: 2
- Connections: Ryde Racine: 7, 27

Construction
- Parking: Yes
- Cycle facilities: Outdoor bicycle parking
- Accessible: Yes

Other information
- Station code: Amtrak: SVT

History
- Opened: August 14, 2006

Passengers
- FY 2025: 55,779 (Amtrak)

Services
Preceding station	Amtrak	Following station
Milwaukee Airport toward St. Paul	Borealis	Glenview toward Chicago
Milwaukee Airport toward Milwaukee	Hiawatha	Glenview toward Chicago
Empire Builder does not stop here
Former services
Preceding station	Milwaukee Road	Following station
Milwaukee toward Seattle or Tacoma	Main Line	Deerfield toward Chicago
Franksville toward Milwaukee	Chicago – Milwaukee	Somers toward Chicago
Location

Sturtevant station is an Amtrak railroad station in Sturtevant, Wisconsin, United States, which opened for service on August 14, 2006. It is located on East Exploration Court in the Renaissance Business Park off Wisconsin Highway 20. The facility accommodates travelers who use the Hiawatha between Chicago and Milwaukee and the related Borealis between Chicago and St. Paul, Minnesota, and sees fourteen daily arrivals. The Empire Builder also passes through this station but does not stop. Located along tracks owned by the Canadian Pacific Kansas City railroad, the station was constructed as a replacement for the former Milwaukee Road depot, which was moved from its former location to Caledonia in October 2009.

== Service and facilities ==
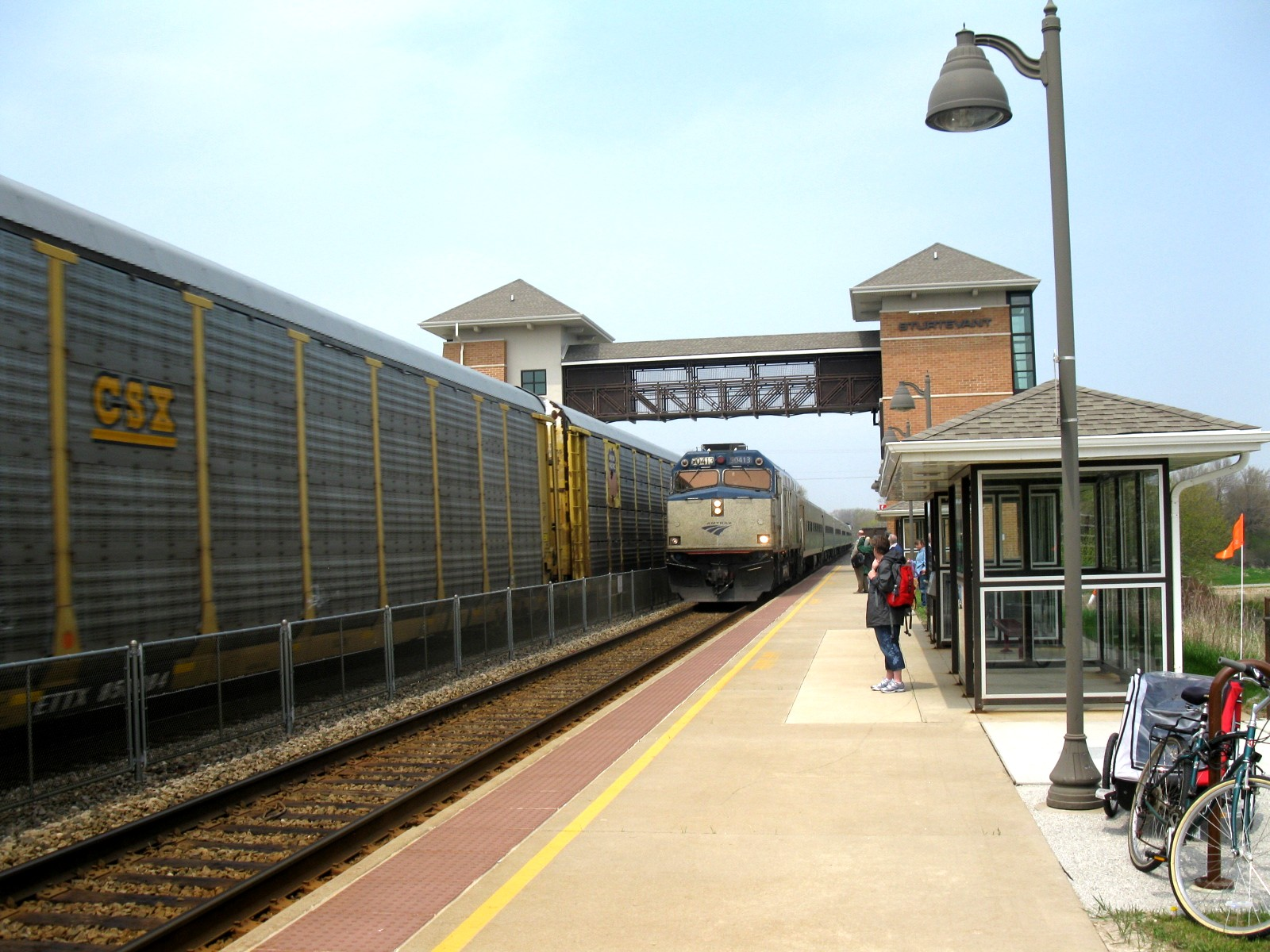
A Hiawatha train pulls into Sturtevant as a Canadian Pacific freight passes on the left.

The Sturtevant station's primary function is to provide residents of Racine, Kenosha and the southern portions of the Milwaukee metropolitan area with intercity service. The station sees fourteen daily arrivals, with six Hiawatha trains each direction and one pair of Borealis trains, which took over the scheduled time slots of a former seventh pair of Hiawathas. All trains operate from Chicago Union Station on the southern end of the route. Hiawatha trains operate from Milwaukee Intermodal Station in the north, while Borealis trains run from St. Paul Union Depot. The station is the second stop enroute from Milwaukee to Chicago, 23 miles (37 km) with a travel time of about 28 minutes. It is also the third stop en route from Chicago, with a travel time along the 63-mile (101 km) section taking one hour. In Amtrak's fiscal year 2025, the station handled 55,779 passengers.

The 1,800-square-foot (170 m^{2}) station includes a Quik-Trak ticket kiosk, restrooms, a seating area and a pedestrian bridge to connect the northbound and southbound boarding platforms. As the station is unstaffed, all tickets from the station need to be either purchased in advance or from the Quik-Trak kiosk. The station parking lot contains 170 spaces, with payment required upon entering for daily use and a permit required for monthly use. Connections from the station to the local bus service operated daily by Ryde Racine are also available.

== History ==
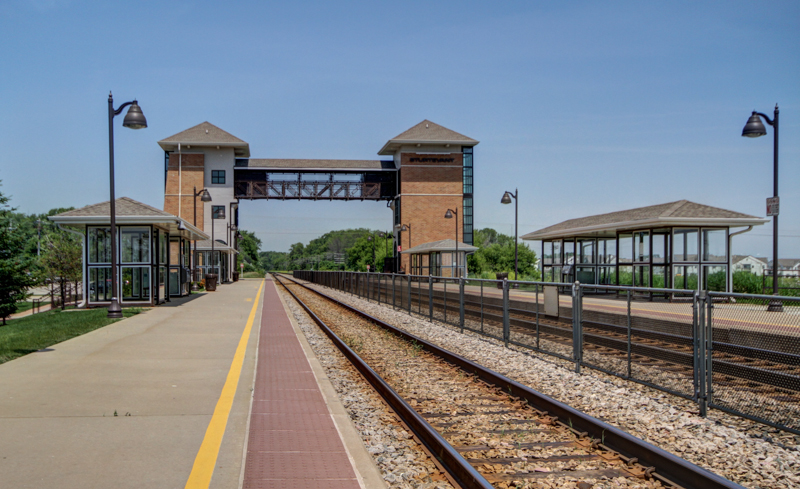
The platforms, tracks and pedestrian bridge at Sturtevant station.

Prior to the completion of this facility, Amtrak served the former Milwaukee Road depot on Wisconsin Street in downtown Sturtevant. Due to the age and condition of the facility, in summer 1998 village officials applied for a federal grant for the construction of a new station. By November, initial construction costs for the facility were estimated at $1 million. Financing for the facility would come 80 percent through a state grant with the remaining 20 percent coming from the village. In July 2000, the original architectural plans were unveiled illustrating a 1,500-square-foot (140 m^{2}) station, two side platforms, and a pedestrian tunnel crossing beneath the tracks. Additionally, construction costs were revised to $1.2 million with an estimated completion date of spring 2001.

Final approval for the construction of the station was given by the Sturtevant Village Board in April 2001, with completion slated for that November. At the time of approval, construction costs were again revised up to $2.1 million and the size of the station was increased to 1,800 square feet (170 m^{2}). By fall 2002, after both design changes and a delay in the receipt federal funding, construction was expected to commence. However, groundbreaking would again be delayed due to a disagreement between the village and the Canadian Pacific Railway regarding liability for what occurs on railroad property during construction. The issue was resolved by February 2003, with solicitation of bids for its construction being requested soon thereafter.

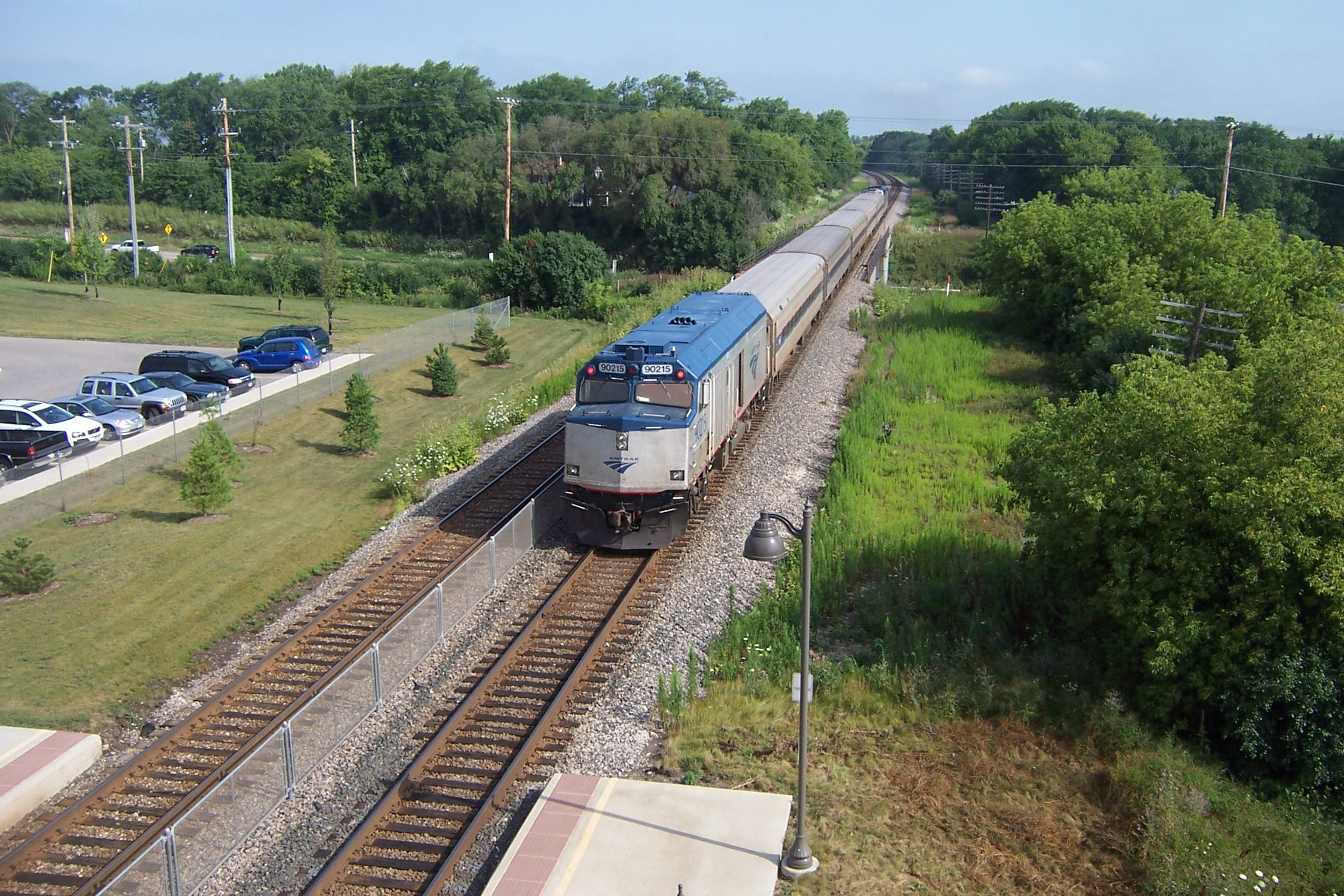
A Milwaukee-bound Hiawatha train departs Sturtevant

In May, costs for construction of the station were again increased to $4.1 million. The increased costs were primarily associated with the relocation of fiber optic lines during the construction of the pedestrian tunnel. To reduce overall costs, village officials asked for architects to remove the tunnel and replace it with an elevated walkway over the tracks. In October 2004, the village board gave final approval to the revised station plan with a pedestrian bridge. The $3.2 million estimated cost of the station was to be financed through a pair of federal transportation grants in addition to the village borrowing against its tax incremental financing district from the adjacent industrial park.

After nearly six years since it was initially proposed, ground was broken for the station in September 2005. The official dedication for the $3.2 million facility occurred on August 12, 2006, with Governor Jim Doyle, U.S. Representative Paul Ryan and Racine County Executive Bill McReynolds in attendance. Service would be discontinued at the 1901-depot the following day with the new facility opening for passenger service on August 14, 2006. The shuttered, 1901 station would subsequently be deconstructed and relocated to Caledonia between August and October 2009.

For much of the spring of 2020, Sturtevant was temporarily a stop on the Empire Builder, a long-distance train connecting Chicago to the Pacific Northwest. The stop was added when the Hiawatha was suspended in the wake of the COVID-19 pandemic.

Daily service to/from St. Paul began on May 21, 2024, when Hiawatha trains 333 (northbound) and 340 (southbound) were extended to become Borealis trains 1333 and 1340.

== Statistics ==
Ridership by Fiscal Year
Fiscal Year	Ridership
2003	38,307
2004	48,451
2005	52,235
2006	58,748
2007	61,672
2008	74,176
2009	71,369
2010	70,737
2011	69,166
2012	75,052
2013	74,031
2014	70,341
2015	74,472
2016	76,987
2017	83,902
2018	82,813
2019	81,846
2020	36,178
2021	17,977
2022	36,289
2023	47,266
2024	55,896

View chart definition.
