= Wisconsin Highway 119 =

Highway in Wisconsin

State Trunk Highway 119
- Airport Spur
- WIS-119 highlighted in red

Route information
- Maintained by WisDOT
- Length: 1.89 mi (3.04 km)

Major junctions
- West end: I-41 / I-94 / US 41 in Milwaukee
- WIS 38 in Milwaukee
- East end: Milwaukee Mitchell International Airport in Milwaukee

Location
- Country: United States
- State: Wisconsin
- Counties: Milwaukee

Highway system
- Wisconsin State Trunk Highway System; Interstate; US; State; Scenic; Rustic
← WIS 118	→ WIS 120

State Trunk Highway 119 (often called Highway 119, STH-119 or WIS 119), better known as the "Airport Spur", is a connector freeway in Milwaukee, in the southeastern part of the U.S. state of Wisconsin. The 1.89-mile (3.04 km) freeway connects Interstate 94 (I-94) to Milwaukee Mitchell International Airport. WIS 119 has had many different iterations dating back to 1919, and since has had five other variations including the modern day route. These different roads were short lived but were located throughout the state of Wisconsin in the Milwaukee area, Manitowoc and Green Bay.

The current route starts at I-41/I-94 and has just one more exit at WIS 38 (Howell Avenue) before ending at the airport. Until 2007, WIS 119 was not signed but was commissioned and appeared on highway maps as a de facto unsigned route. After travelers in the area became confused because the route was not signed, officials decided to change the exit signs from I-94 in order to include the highway. There have been plans to rebuild WIS 119 as part of a larger project in the Milwaukee area.

== Route description ==
WIS 119 starts at I-41/I-94 exit number 318 and continues eastbound as a four-lane freeway. It progresses through a mainly residential area for most of its length, though noise barrier walls obscure most of this housing from view. There are multiple official signs directing Milwaukee Mitchell International Airport traffic along the route towards parking (with current capacity noted by electronic signage), cargo and terminals. At the terminus the speed limit drops to 35 miles per hour (56 km/h). The WIS 119 routing officially terminates at the WIS 38 (South Howell Avenue) exit, with the road continuing towards the terminal undesignated. The terminus also features lit signage reading "MKE" eastbound resembling that of Los Angeles International Airport's larger "LAX" sign within the median.

== History ==
WIS 119 has had many different versions throughout different areas of Wisconsin. The first route debuted in 1919 as a short connector trunkline along the present-day route of WIS 83; within a few years this routing was replaced. The next version of the road was completed in 1924 starting at WIS 19 in Pewaukee and continuing to downtown Milwaukee. In 1930 the route was decommissioned, leaving part of the road in local control and the other becoming a piece of US 16. In 1931 WIS 119 reappeared in the Manitowoc area. In 1956 US 141 ended up supplanting WIS 119, leading the short route to be taken into local control. WIS 119 was commissioned again in 1968 in Green Bay. Like its predecessors this variation of the route was eventually decommissioned and replaced by a Bus. US 41 designation.

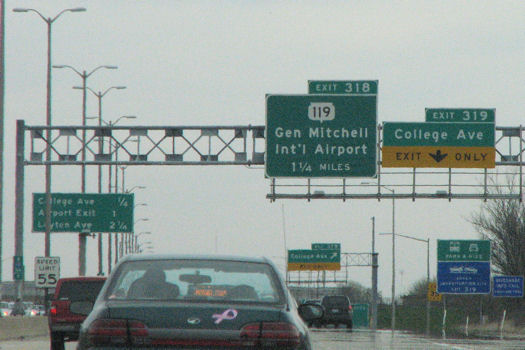
Photo of the exit sign for WIS 119 taken from I-94, the signs were recently added after travelers had a hard time finding the route.

As described in a 1974 Milwaukee County memorandum, the modern route was originally planned as one of five new freeways. It was the only one ever built. The road was designed to offer more support to a growing Milwaukee Mitchell International Airport and facilitate travel between the airport and Interstate 94. The project received multiple criticisms, such as the relocation of a historic B-25 bomber and the resignation of a highway official. This along with other factors prompted the Milwaukee Common Council to oppose the new freeway, and instead suggest a new airport be built outside Milwaukee County. The new airport was not built and in 1978 the freeway was completed.

On April 10, 2007, the Wisconsin Department of Transportation (WisDOT) changed the exit signs from I-94 for the Airport Spur, removing unclear signs only showing the airport name combined with an airplane pictogram, to clearly identify the exit as Wisconsin Highway 119. According to Wisconsin DOT official Tom Heydel (quoted in the Milwaukee Journal Sentinel's Road Warrior column), the signs were changed after local and out-of-town drivers asked why the exit and ramps leading to the road did not have the Highway 119 notation. Since publication of the 1983–84 official map, state highway maps, maps from the local Milwaukee Map Service (which are often used for local navigation and dispatching purposes) and online mapping sources have labeled the route as Highway 119, though many road atlases and less expensive maps left the road unlabeled beyond the notation "Airport Spur", often because the map scaling of a Milwaukee-area map would leave little room to indicate Highway 119's presence without the indicating shield covering the entire route. However, travelers had trouble finding the road, which was not identified as Highway 119 by highway signage. As part of the rebuilding of the I-94/US-41 corridor there have been plans to rebuild the route into "less of a freeway and more of a gateway." According to Robert Gutierrez a project supervisor, the plan would be to turn the freeway into "a boulevard of sorts." This project lasted from 2009 until the end of the 2010 construction season.

== Exit list ==
The entire route is in Milwaukee, Milwaukee County.

mi	km	Destinations	Notes
0.00	0.00	I-41 / I-94 to I-894 – Milwaukee, Chicago	Western terminus; I-41/I-94 exit 318
1.89	3.04	WIS 38 (Howell Avenue)	Road continues under local control to Milwaukee Mitchell International Airport
1.000 mi = 1.609 km; 1.000 km = 0.621 mi
