= Freight Runners Express =

Airline of the United States

Freight Runners Express / Air Charter Express
IATA	ICAO	Call sign
-	FRG	FREIGHT RUNNERS
- Founded: 1985
- AOC #: KCQA493F
- Hubs: Milwaukee Mitchell International Airport
- Fleet size: 28
- Destinations: 400+
- Headquarters: Milwaukee, Wisconsin, United States
- Key people: Patrick Hammer (President & Director of Operations); Robert Sevier (Vice President & General Manager); Theresa Cook (Vice President, Accounting & Personnel); Timothy Leech (Director of Maintenance); Chad Aumueller (Vice President, Procurement)
- Employees: 130+
- Website: freightrunners.com

Freight Runners Express is an airline based in Milwaukee, Wisconsin, United States. The airline operates scheduled and on-demand air cargo and passenger services. Passenger air charter services are operated under the Air Charter Express (ACE) brand using Saab 2000 aircraft. Freight Runners is headquartered at Milwaukee Mitchell International Airport in Milwaukee.

== Company history ==
Freight Runners Express began operations in 1985 flying cargo across the state of Wisconsin. Passenger operations began in 1992 with the launch of the Air Charter Express brand. FRE/ACE is the world's largest civilian operator of Saab 2000 aircraft with 7 aircraft currently operating in the fleet.

== Current fleet ==
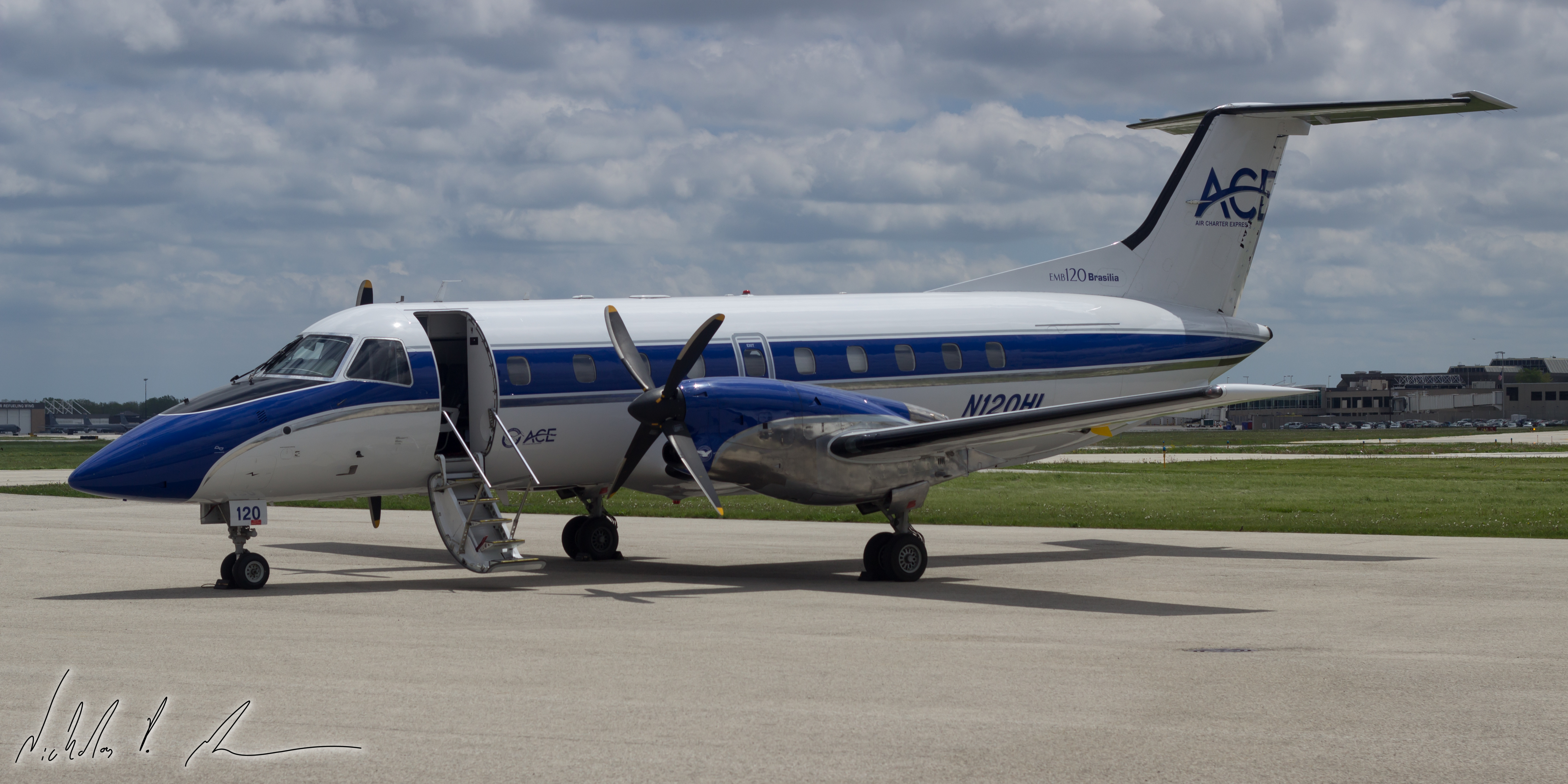
Freight Runners Express Embraer 120FC

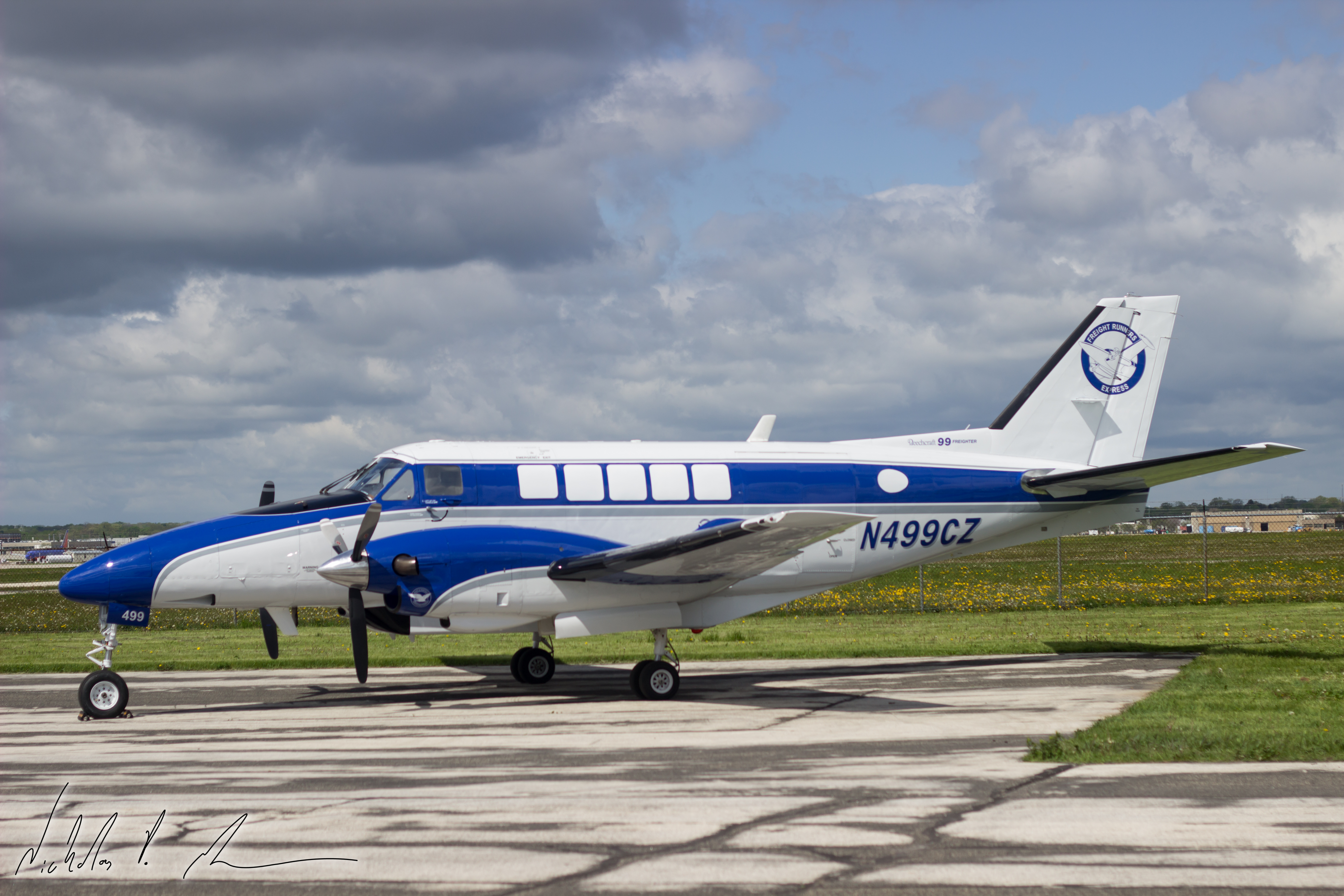
Freight Runners Express Beech 99 Freighter

As of August 2025, Freight Runners Express operated the following aircraft:

Aircraft	In fleet	Passenger capacity	Cargo capacity
Embraer EMB 120FC	9	-	7500 lbs
Beech 99 Freighter	11	-	3600 lbs
Saab 2000	8	30 passengers	
Total	28		

== Historical fleet ==
Freight Runners Express has operated many aircraft types in its history.

Aircraft	Entered service	Retired
Piper Cherokee 6	1983	1987
Beech 18	2000	2002
King Air C90	2001	2004
Cessna 207	1987	2015
Cessna 402	1990	2015
King Air B350	2009	2019
Beech 1900C Freighter	2007	2022

Notes:

- The Cessna 402 fleet was originally operated in an interchangeable passenger and cargo configuration. In 2006 the fleet was permanently converted to an all cargo configuration.

== Statistics ==
Freight Runners Express flies 2,065,000 pounds of cargo per calendar year. The fleet will fly an average of 3,700,000 miles, arriving at 390 cities and carrying 39,060 passengers. This is achieved with 9,570 flights totaling 8,400 hours of flight time.
