= Milwaukee Mitchell International Airport =

Airport in Milwaukee, Wisconsin, United States

Milwaukee Mitchell International Airport (MKE) Mitchell Field

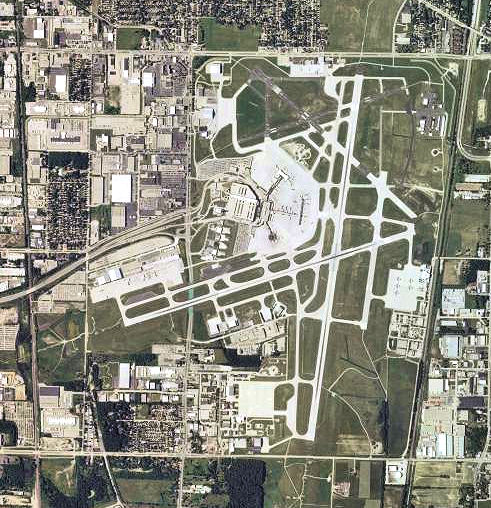
- 2006 USGS orthophoto
- IATA: MKE; ICAO: KMKE; FAA LID: MKE

Summary
- Airport type: Public
- Owner/Operator: Milwaukee County Aviation Department
- Serves: Milwaukee metropolitan area
- Location: 5300 South Howell Avenue; Milwaukee, Wisconsin, U.S.
- Hub for: Air Cargo Carriers; Freight Runners Express
- Elevation AMSL: 728 ft (222 m)
- Coordinates: 42°56′34.4″N 87°54′52″W
- Website: www.mitchellairport.com

Maps
- FAA airport diagram
- Interactive map of Milwaukee Mitchell International Airport (MKE); Mitchell Field

Runways
Direction	Length		Surface
Direction	ft	m	Surface
01L/19R	9,990	3,045	Asphalt/concrete
01R/19L	4,182	1,275	Asphalt/concrete
07L/25R	4,797	1,462	Asphalt/concrete
07R/25L	8,300	2,530	Asphalt/concrete
13/31	5,537	1,688	Asphalt/concrete

Helipads
Number	Length		Surface
Number	ft	m	Surface
H1	100	30	Asphalt/concrete

Statistics (2025)
- Aircraft operations: 97,823
- Total passengers: 5,874,372 ▼7.0%
- Cargo and mail (lb.): 111,421,106

Milwaukee Mitchell International Airport (IATA: MKE, ICAO: KMKE, FAA LID: MKE) is a civil–military airport 5 nautical miles (9.3 km; 5.8 mi) south of downtown Milwaukee, Wisconsin, United States. It is included in the Federal Aviation Administration (FAA) National Plan of Integrated Airport Systems for 2025–2029, in which it is categorized as a medium-hub primary commercial service facility. Milwaukee Mitchell International Airport covers 2,314 acres (936 ha) and has five asphalt and concrete runways.

The airport is named in honor of United States Army General Billy Mitchell, who was raised in Milwaukee and is often regarded as the father of the United States Air Force. Along with being the primary airport for Milwaukee, Mitchell International is also used by travelers throughout Southern and Eastern Wisconsin and Northern Illinois. Since March 1941, the airport's weather station has been used as the official point for Milwaukee weather observations and records by the National Weather Service, whose area office is located in Sullivan.

== History ==
The original airfield was established in 1920 as Hamilton Airport by local business owner and aviator, Thomas F. Hamilton. Milwaukee County purchased the land on October 19, 1926, and renamed the airport Milwaukee County Airport. The first airport terminal there, the Hirschbuehl Farmhouse, opened in July 1927. That month, Northwest Airlines, Inc., began air service from Milwaukee to Chicago and Minneapolis/St. Paul. In August 1927, world-renowned aviator Charles Lindbergh visited the Milwaukee airport. Kohler Aviation Corporation began providing passenger service across Lake Michigan on August 31, 1929.

During the late depression years (1938–July 1940), a new two-story passenger terminal building was constructed by the Works Progress Administration. On March 17, 1941, the airport was renamed General Mitchell Field after Milwaukee native and air power advocate Brigadier General William "Billy" Mitchell. On January 4, 1945, Mitchell Field was leased to the War Department for use as a World War II prisoner-of-war camp. Over 3,000 prisoners and 250 enlisted men stayed at the work camp. Escaped German prisoners were often surprised to find a large German American population just beyond the fence.

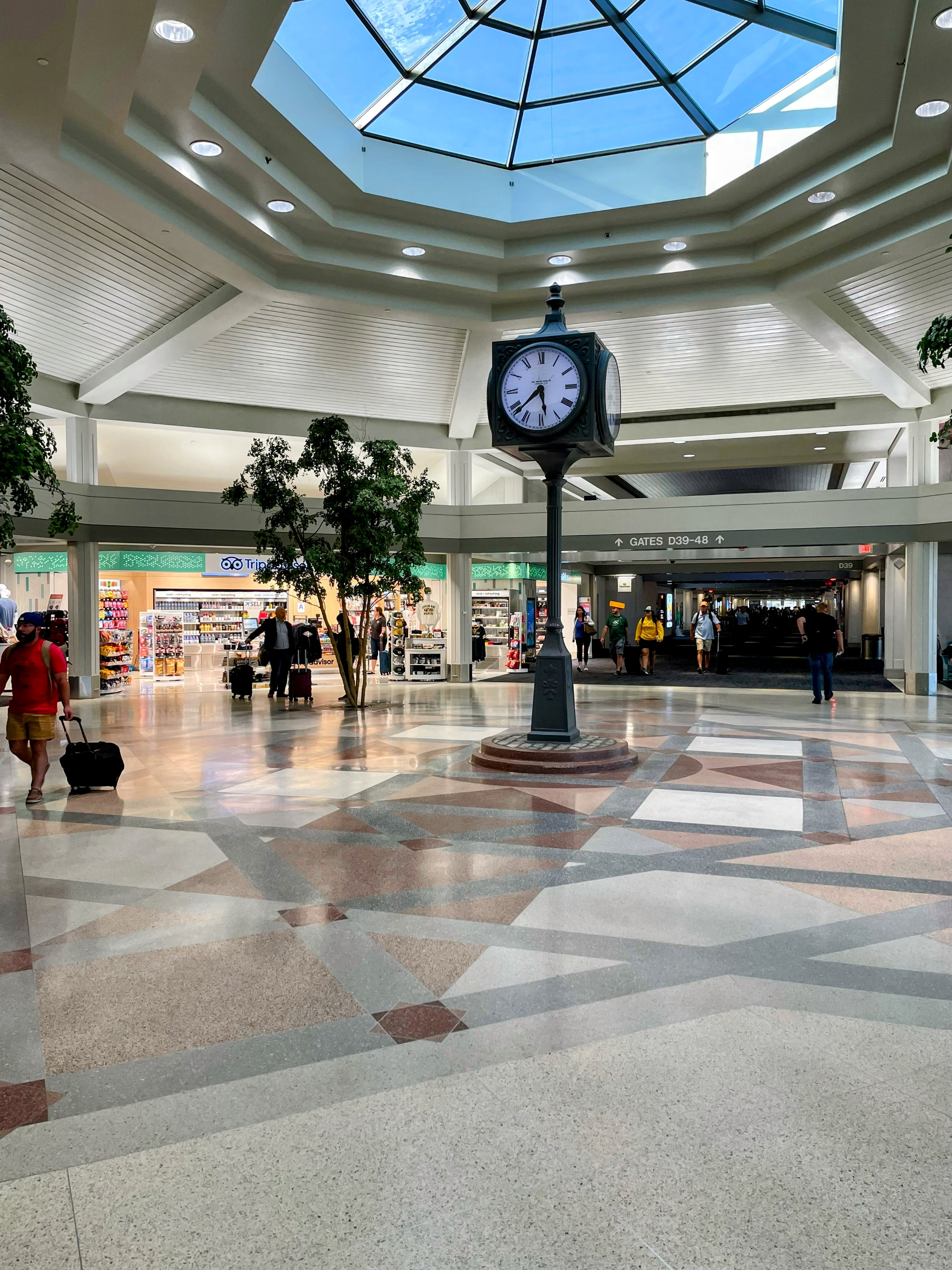
Trees, a skylight, and a clock in the rotunda created by the Concourse D "hammerhead" expansion project

The present terminal opened on July 20, 1955, and was designed by Leigh Fisher and Associates. It was renovated and expanded in 1985, designed by Miller, Meier, Kenyon, Cooper Architects and Planners Inc. The "hammerhead" section of the D concourse was added in 1990.

On June 19, 1986, the Milwaukee County Board of Supervisors renamed the airport General Mitchell International Airport. The airport was formerly a hub for AirTran Airways, Frontier Airlines, Midwest Airlines and North Central Airlines. The airport is owned and operated by Milwaukee County, but some Milwaukee business leaders and politicians have advocated privatization or leasing it to a third party for financial reasons.

In February 2019, the airport was renamed from "General Mitchell International Airport" to "Milwaukee Mitchell International Airport," a rebranding meant to highlight the airport's location; the old name is still used by the FAA and US government.

In March 2023, the airport was recognized by the Airports Council International as one of the best airports in the world, marking the second consecutive year the airport received this recognition. It was one of only 10 airports of any size in the U.S. to earn a 2022 ASQ "Best Airport" award.

=== Expansion ===
Mitchell International expanded the runway safety area at the end of the runways after an accident on January 21, 2007, when Northwest Airlines Flight 1726 skidded off the runway following an aborted takeoff. According to the FAA, most airports are encouraged to have a runway safety area no shorter than 1,000 feet (305 m), though many airports do not. Construction of the runway safety areas began at the end of summer 2009 and was completed in fall 2012.

There was also a "Master Plan" idea to increase the terminal area by stretching the existing terminal (in some cases, to almost double the size) or begin construction of a separate terminal. Nearly all cases would involve major reconstruction on the airport itself, and would have a huge impact on the airport's traffic. These plans were, however, drafted before Mitchell saw a significant reduction in carriers and flights. More recently, in 2012, there were discussions of closing one concourse as a cost-cutting move.

The approved 2018 Milwaukee County Budget contained initial funding for replacement of the now-closed Concourse E with a new International Terminal. It would replace the current International Arrivals Terminal (IAT) which has limited capacity and is not connected to the main terminal building. The new terminal was planned to open in 2020 after the demolition of Concourse E was completed. During October 2018, airport and Milwaukee County officials set a timeline for design, construction and completion of the new International terminal. Pre-design work and bidding concluded in November 2018, with construction set to begin in early 2021 and likely concluding in mid-2022. In May 2020, Milwaukee County announced with the COVID-19 pandemic severely reducing the airport's operations and de facto ending international service temporarily, that the start of the project had been postponed.

As of September 2025, work has started on the redevelopment of Concourse E to build a new international concourse. This will allow the closure of the existing International Arrivals building, which is currently separate from the main terminal. Airport officials are expecting to conclude the project in 2027.

== Facilities ==
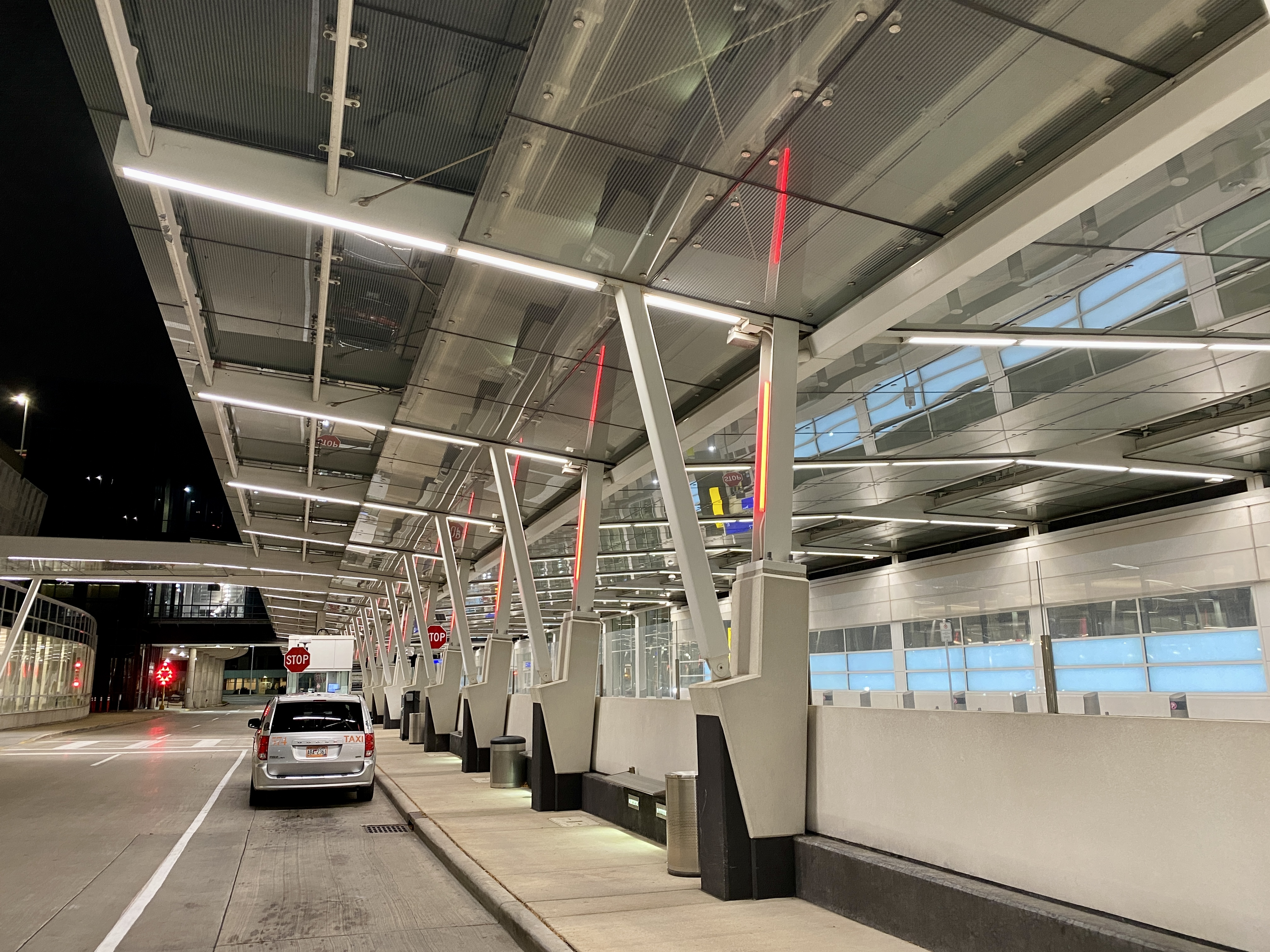
Departures area at Milwaukee Mitchell International Airport

=== Terminal ===
Milwaukee Mitchell International Airport has one terminal with two concourses and 38 gates. All international arrivals lacking border pre-clearance must pass through the International Arrivals Building. Concourse C houses Southwest Airlines and United Airlines; and Concourse D houses the remaining airlines at the airport. There is also a Delta Sky Club in Concourse D.

The terminal houses the Mitchell Gallery of Flight (a non-profit museum) and a USO room on the concession level, along with the usual retail outlets, including a small food court and a branch of Renaissance Books which is believed to be the world's first used book store in an airport. There are play areas for children throughout the facility. On-site enrollment for TSA PreCheck is available without an appointment at CLEAR kiosks in the main terminal seven days a week. An observation lot along the northern edge of the airport is open to the public and tower communications are rebroadcast using a low-power FM transmitter for visitors to tune in on their car radios. There is also a new lot on 6th Street, with a Wisconsin historical marker giving the airport's history. Previously located inside the security perimeter of a domestic concourse was a large clay "peace mural" from Leningrad, now Saint Petersburg in Russia. Created by Soviet citizens, it was exchanged for an equivalent clay mural made by Americans. The Milwaukee mural was covered up during the 2022 Russian invasion of Ukraine and subsequently moved to the customs screening area of the International Arrivals Building in 2024.

In April 2017, all airlines housed in Concourse E began moving to Concourse C. This would allow the airport to remodel the concourse and move International Arrivals processing into the terminal. Following redevelopment of Concourse E, the current International Arrivals Building just north of the main terminals will close. Airport officials have begun work on the project as of September 2025. The redeveloped concourse is designed to have between 2-5 gates per the airport's Implementation Plan, and is expected to be completed in 2027.

=== Ground transportation ===
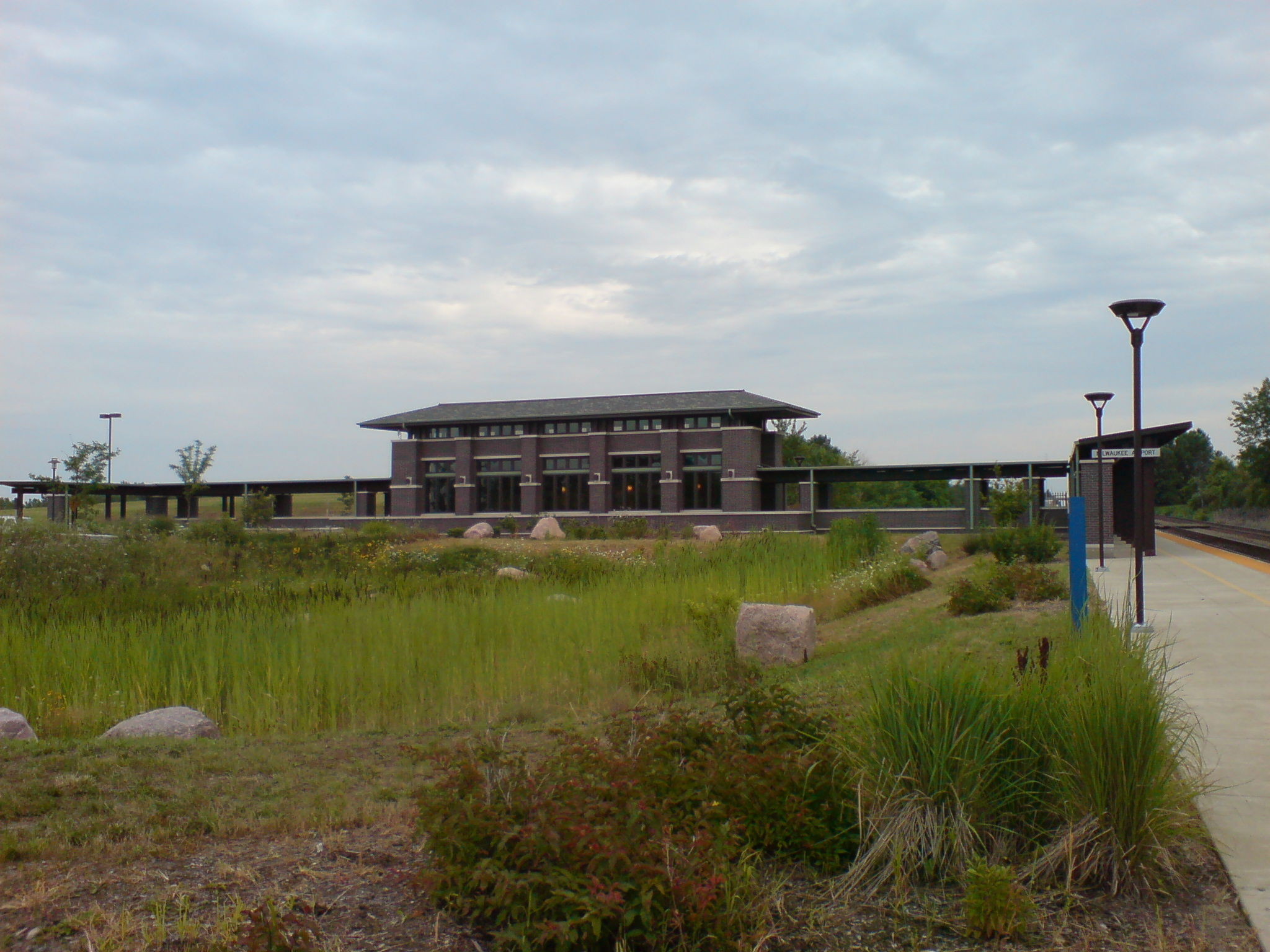
The Milwaukee Airport Rail Station has Amtrak service to Chicago and Saint Paul.

Milwaukee Mitchell International Airport is accessible from I-41/I-94 and WIS 38 via WIS 119.

Local transit:

- MCTS Green Line offers service to downtown and north shore suburbs. Route 80 serves the Airport from Oak Creek, downtown, and the Milwaukee's north side.

Intercity transit:

- Badger Coaches has frequent trips between Mitchell Airport, Downtown Milwaukee, Johnson Creek, Goerkes Corners, and Madison.
- Airport Connection serves the airport, Sheboygan, and the Fox Valley Area.
- Amtrak's Milwaukee Airport Rail Station is served by the Hiawatha and the Borealis. The station is 3/4 of a mile from the airport. Free shuttle buses go between the train station and the baggage claim. Service mostly runs to Chicago or downtown Milwaukee, with one daily departure on the Borealis to Saint Paul.
- An Amtrak Thruway bus service previously ran from the airport to Fond du Lac, Oshkosh, Appleton, and Green Bay. This service was suspended indefinitely as of October 1, 2025, when it lost its funding from the State of Wisconsin.
- Wisconsin Coach Lines, as Airport Express, operates frequently to O'Hare Airport (ORD) in Chicago and from Waukesha, Milwaukee (Downtown and the Amtrak/Greyhound Station), Racine and Kenosha.
- Lamers Connect, operates daily service to/from Wausau with stops in Milwaukee (Intermodal Station), Fond du Lac, Oshkosh, Appleton, Waupaca and Stevens Point.

=== U.S. Air Force ===
The airport also hosts the General Mitchell Air National Guard Base on the eastern area of the airport property, home to the 128th Air Refueling Wing (128 ARW), an Air Mobility Command (AMC)-gained unit of the Wisconsin Air National Guard flying the Boeing KC-135R Stratotanker. The wing performs both Federal and State missions and consists of approximately 1000 Air National Guard personnel, both full-time Active Guard and Reserve (AGR) and Air Reserve Technicians (ART), as well as traditional part-time guardsmen, available for worldwide deployment. The wing also maintains a KC-135 flight simulator, providing training proficiency for its own crews, as well as other KC-135 flight crews in other air refueling wings and air mobility wings in the Regular U.S. Air Force, the Air Force Reserve Command and the Air National Guard.

Prior to 2007, a second military installation on the southwestern portion of the airport property was known as "General Mitchell Air Reserve Station" and was home to the 440th Airlift Wing (440 AW), an Air Mobility Command (AMC)-gained unit of the Air Force Reserve Command (AFRC) flying the C-130H Hercules. While based at General Mitchell ARS, the 440 AW numbered in excess of 1500 full-time AGR, ART and part-time traditional reservists. Pursuant to 2005 Base Realignment and Closure Commission (BRAC) action, the 440 AW relocated to Pope AFB, North Carolina, in 2007 and the former AFRC facilities were turned over to the Air National Guard, resulting in the installation's renaming.

=== Aircraft maintenance ===
In 2018, SkyWest Airlines established a maintenance base at the airport, bringing its total to 12 across the US.

== Airlines and destinations ==
=== Passenger ===
Airlines	Destinations
Alaska Airlines	Seattle/Tacoma
American Airlines	Charlotte, Dallas/Fort Worth, Phoenix–Sky Harbor; Seasonal: Philadelphia
American Eagle	Chicago–O'Hare, Philadelphia, Washington–National; Seasonal: Charlotte, Miami
Delta Air Lines	Atlanta, Detroit, Minneapolis/St. Paul, Salt Lake City
Delta Connection	Boston, Detroit, Minneapolis/St. Paul, New York–JFK (ends December 18, 2026), New York–LaGuardia
Frontier Airlines	Orlando
JetBlue	Seasonal: Boston
Southwest Airlines	Austin, Baltimore, Chicago–Midway, Dallas–Love, Denver, Fort Myers, Kansas City, Las Vegas, Nashville, Orlando, Phoenix–Sky Harbor, San Diego, St. Louis, Tampa, Washington–National; Seasonal: Cancún, Fort Lauderdale, Miami, Panama City (FL) (begins March 11, 2027), Sarasota
Sun Country Airlines	Seasonal: Cancún, Fort Myers, Las Vegas, Minneapolis/St. Paul, Orlando, Phoenix–Sky Harbor, Punta Cana
United Airlines	Denver
United Express	Chicago–O'Hare, Houston–Intercontinental, Newark

=== Destinations maps ===
Domestic destinations from MKE.
Red = Year-round destination; Green = Seasonal destination; Blue = Future destination; Purple = Route ending
International destinations from MKE.
Red = Year-round destination; Green = Seasonal destination; Blue = Future destination; Purple = Route ending

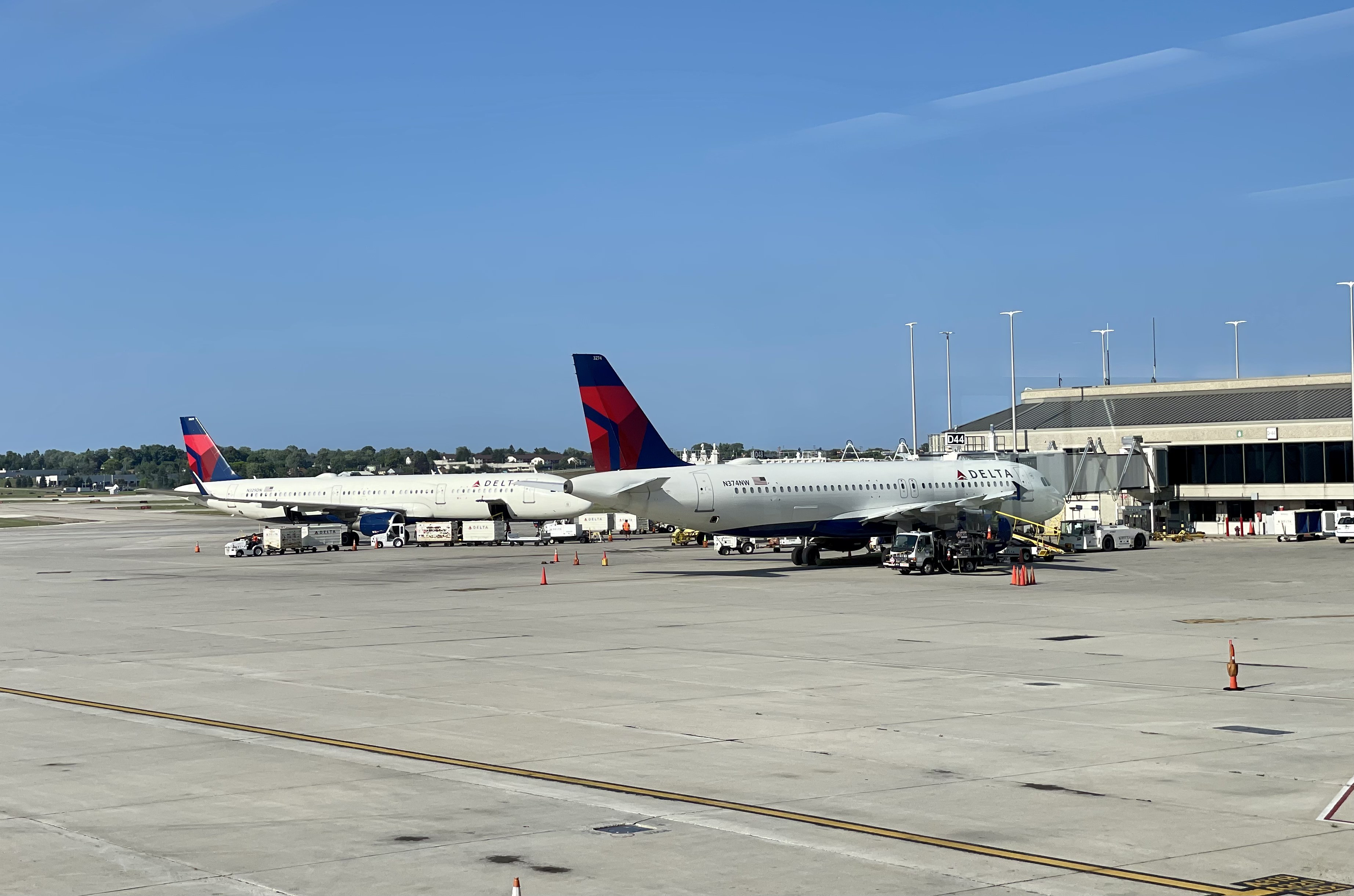
Delta Air Lines jets on the Concourse D ramp at Mitchell International Airport

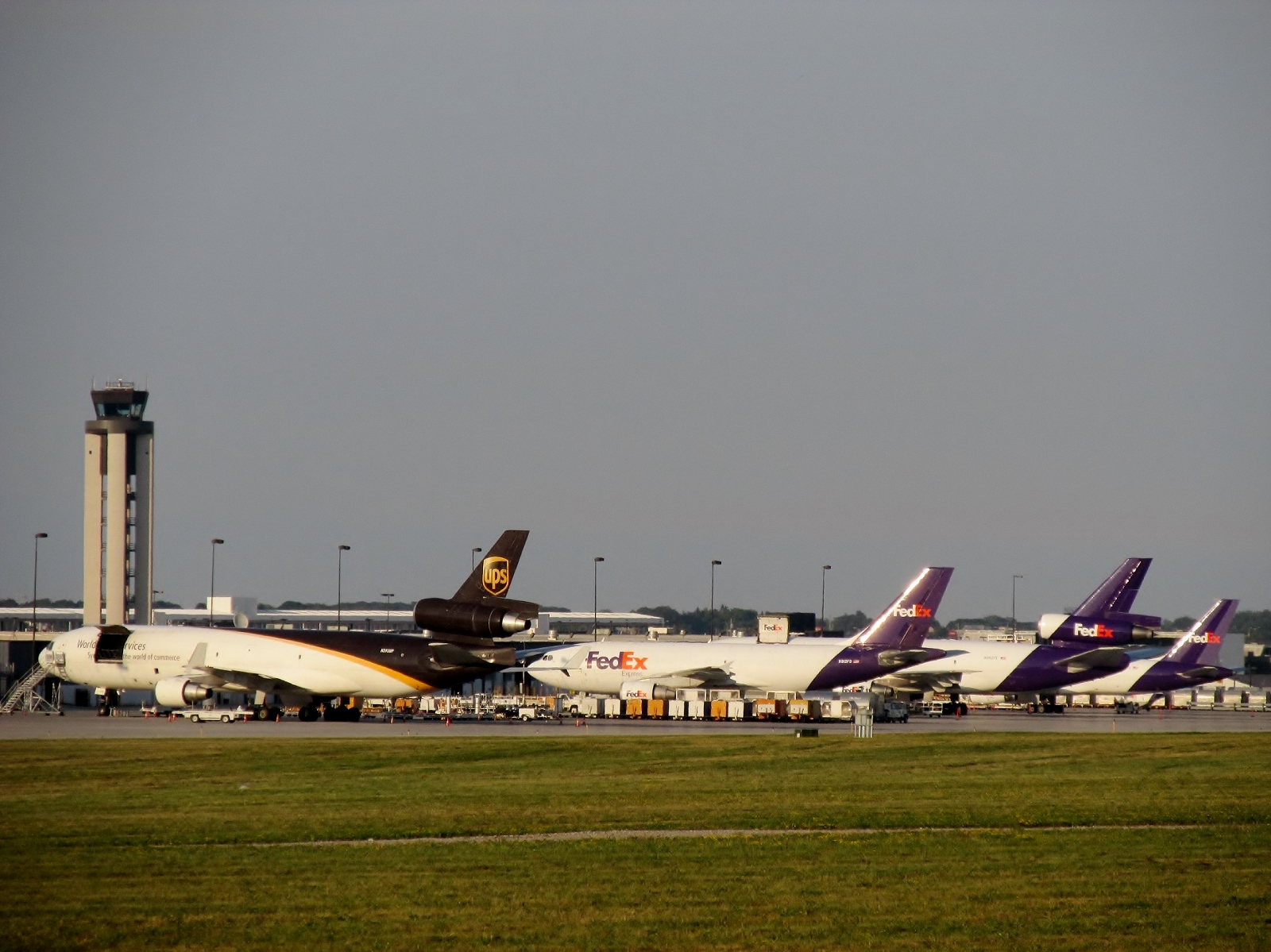
Cargo ramp at Mitchell International Airport

== Statistics ==
=== Airline market share ===
Largest airlines at MKE (September 2025 – August 2026)
Rank	Airline	Passengers	Share
1	Southwest	2,368,000	42.61%
2	Delta	833,000	14.98%
3	SkyWest	713,000	12.83%
4	American	558,000	10.04%
5	Republic	260,000	4.68%
	Other	826,000	14.86%

=== Top destinations ===
Busiest domestic routes from MKE (September 2025 – August 2026)
Rank	Airport	Passengers	Carriers
1	Atlanta, Georgia	285,820	Delta
2	Denver, Colorado	261,930	Southwest, United
3	Chicago–O'Hare, Illinois	213,000	American, United
4	Phoenix–Sky Harbor, Arizona	196,280	American, Frontier, Southwest, Sun Country
5	Orlando, Florida	192,070	Frontier, Southwest, Sun Country
6	Las Vegas, Nevada	130,670	Frontier, Southwest, Sun Country
7	Dallas/Fort Worth, Texas	129,650	American
8	Minneapolis/St. Paul, Minnesota	125,310	Delta, Sun Country
9	Nashville, Tennessee	117,090	Southwest
10	Detroit, Michigan	116,870	Delta

=== Annual traffic ===
Annual passenger traffic at MKE 1974–present
Year	Passengers	Year	Passengers	Year	Passengers	Year	Passengers	Year	Passengers	Year	Passengers
1974	2,143,071	1984	2,573,239	1994	5,179,872	2004	6,661,105	2014	6,548,960	2024	6,316,245
1975	2,241,745	1985	3,062,954	1995	5,221,705	2005	7,268,000	2015	6,545,938	2025	5,874,372
1976	2,556,720	1986	3,384,664	1996	5,452,645	2006	7,299,294	2016	6,753,929	2026	
1977	2,803,138	1987	3,570,340	1997	5,598,971	2007	7,712,535	2017	6,899,845	2027	
1978	2,991,750	1988	4,029,746	1998	5,535,921	2008	7,956,968	2018	7,091,766	2028	
1979	3,460,441	1989	4,308,295	1999	5,825,670	2009	7,935,124	2019	6,889,448	2029	
1980	3,295,509	1990	4,488,304	2000	6,076,628	2010	9,848,377	2020	2,625,295	2030	
1981	3,117,883	1991	4,114,051	2001	5,600,060	2011	9,522,456	2021	4,524,345	2031	
1982	3,285,884	1992	4,422,089	2002	5,589,127	2012	7,502,309	2022	5,439,055	2032	
1983	2,923,641	1993	4,521,872	2003	6,142,124	2013	6,520,515	2023	6,015,731	2033	

- From 1944 through 2025, 297,295,864 passengers (enplaned+deplaned) have passed through Milwaukee Mitchell Int'l Airport, an annual average of 3,625,559 passengers per year.

== Accidents and incidents ==
- On December 17, 1954, a Miller Brewing Company plane, a converted twin-engine Lockheed Ventura bound for Winnipeg on a Friday evening, had trouble with both engines and crashed shortly after takeoff from Mitchell Field. All four on board were killed, which included company president Fred Miller and his oldest son, 20-year-old Fred Jr., and the two company pilots, brothers Joseph and Paul Laird.
- On August 4, 1968, a Convair CV-580, flying as North Central Airlines Flight 261, collided in mid-air with a rented Cessna 150F 11.5 miles (19 km) southwest of the airport. The Cessna was destroyed, but its cabin remained embedded in the Convair's forward baggage compartment; the Cessna's three occupants were killed. The Convair made a safe emergency landing at Milwaukee. The Cessna was on a VFR flight from Lombard, Illinois to Sheboygan County Memorial Airport in Sheboygan Falls. It was determined that the inability of the Convair 580 flight crew to detect the Cessna 150 visually in sufficient time to take evasive action, despite having been provided with three radar traffic advisories, caused the crash. Visual detection capabilities were reduced by the heavy accumulation of insect smears on the windows of the Convair. Visibility was further reduced by haze, smoke and sunglare, and by the inconspicuous color and lack of relative motion of the Cessna.
- On January 29, 1969, a Boeing KC-97, operated by the Wisconsin Air National Guard, crashed just short of the runway on final approach. The weather was foggy with a visibility of a half mile. Four of the 11 people on board were killed, and the plane was damaged beyond repair.
- On January 22, 1971, Northwest Airlines Flight 433 was hijacked after taking off from Milwaukee to Detroit, Michigan. The hijacker demanded to be taken to Algeria, but landed in Cuba.
- On July 27, 1974, a USMC Hawker Siddeley AV-8A Harrier crashed during a hover maneuver at as part of an air show demonstration flight. The impact of the crash initiated the firing of the pilot's ejection seat and the pilot survived.
- On September 6, 1985, Midwest Express Flight 105, Midwest's first and only fatal accident, crashed upon takeoff from Milwaukee. One of the airline's Douglas DC-9s crashed while taking off, bound for Atlanta's Hartsfield International Airport. According to NTSB reports, the crash was caused by improper pilot reaction when the plane's right engine failed due to stress corrosion cracking. The improper flight control inputs caused an uncommanded roll and accelerated stall. The 31 people on board died.
- On December 10, 1993, a Wisconsin Air National Guard KC-135, was undergoing avionics maintenance when an explosion occurred in the center fuel tank. The plane caught fire and killed six maintenance personnel on the ground. The explosion was believed to be from an overheated fuel pump.
- On September 11, 2001, Midwest Express Flight 7, a DC-9 from MKE to LGA came within 30 feet of United Airlines Flight 175 and had to do two steep dives, injuring two flight attendants and two passengers who were not in their seats.
- On January 21, 2007, a Northwest Airlines DC-9, Northwest Airlines Flight 1726 skidded 400 feet (120 m) off the end of a snowy runway at Milwaukee International Airport. The accident was due to an explosion in one of the engines, forcing the pilot to abort takeoff. The aircraft was headed for Detroit Metropolitan Wayne County Airport and was to continue on to Buffalo Niagara International Airport. Amongst the 104 people aboard, only one back injury was reported.
- On January 24, 2007, two Freight Runners Express cargo planes collided and burned on a taxiway. Both pilots were able to escape without injury. The planes were a Cessna 402 and a Beech 99. An NTSB investigation determined both pilots and air traffic control were at fault for the accident.
- On June 4, 2007, a Cessna Citation II crashed after reporting a runaway trim tab. The pilot issued a distress signal within five minutes after taking off. The plane then crashed into Lake Michigan two miles (3 km) off shore. The plane was carrying an organ transplant team from the University of Michigan back to Willow Run Airport. There was a crew of two and four passengers aboard. All six died.

== See also ==
- Empire Builder
- Hiawatha
- List of airports in Wisconsin
- Milwaukee Airport station
- Milwaukee County Transit System
- Milwaukee Intermodal Station
