= Dave Ross (politician) =

American businessman and politician

Secretary of the Wisconsin Department of Transportation
- In office 2017–2019
- Governor: Scott Walker
- Preceded by: Mark Gottleib
- Succeeded by: Craig Thompson

1st Secretary of the Wisconsin Department of Safety and Professional Services
- In office 2011–2017
- Governor: Scott Walker
- Preceded by: Position established
- Succeeded by: Laura Gutiérrez

Mayor of Superior, Wisconsin
- In office 2003–2011

Personal details
- Born: Superior, Wisconsin
- Party: Republican
- Education: University of Wisconsin–Superior (B.S.)

Dave Ross is an American businessman and Republican politician. He served as Secretary of the Wisconsin Department of Transportation under Governor Scott Walker from 2017 to 2019, and previously served in Walker's administration as the 1st Secretary of the Wisconsin Department of Safety and Professional Services, created in 2011. He previously served for eight years as mayor of Superior, Wisconsin.

== Biography ==
Ross was born in Superior, Wisconsin, and obtained his bachelor's degree from the University of Wisconsin–Superior. He served for eight years as mayor of Superior from 2003 to 2011. He was a candidate for Lieutenant Governor of Wisconsin in the 2010 Republican primary, but was defeated by Rebecca Kleefisch.

In 2011, Ross was appointed by Governor of Wisconsin Scott Walker to serve as Secretary of the newly established Department of Safety and Professional Services.
