= 2011 Wisconsin protests =

Demonstrations against proposed state legislation

- Part of 2011 United States public employee protests and the impact of the Arab Spring
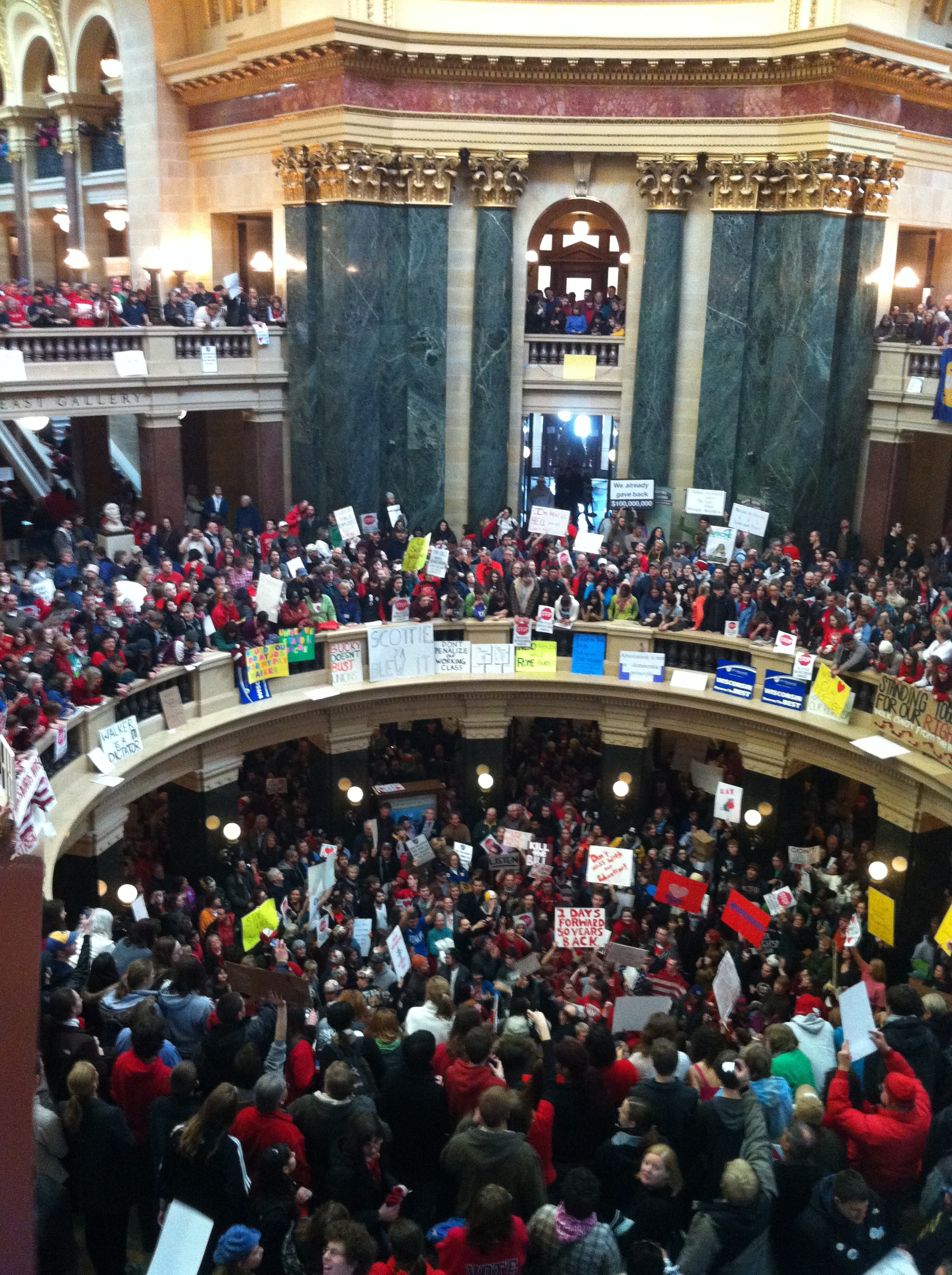
- Thousands gather inside Madison Wisconsin's Capitol rotunda to protest Governor Walker's proposed bill.
- Date: February 14, 2011 – June 16, 2011
- Location: Madison, Wisconsin, U.S. 43°04′30″N 89°23′08″W
- Caused by: Opposition to certain provisions in legislation (Budget Repair Bill) proposed by Governor Scott Walker to limit public employee collective bargaining and address a state budget shortfall.
- Methods: Protests, sit-ins, demonstrations, recall elections, quorum-busting
- Status: Active protests ended by late June 2011; several pending lawsuits
- Concessions: None; Budget Repair Bill passed; 2 Republican State Senators recalled from office (8/9/2011); 2 Democratic State Senators win recall elections on 8/16/11; failed recall attempt of Governor Scott Walker.

Parties
Political organizations: Democratic Party of Wisconsin; Organizing for America; Unions: SEIU; IWW; WEAC (NEA affiliate)	Republican Party of Wisconsin; Anti-tax activists, many affiliated with the Tea Party movement

Lead figures
Non-centralized leadership Wisconsin Democratic Legislature figures: Senate Minority Leader Mark Miller; Assembly Minority Leader Peter Barca; Wisconsin Senate 14: Tim Carpenter; Spencer Coggs; Tim Cullen; Jon Erpenbach; Dave Hansen; Jim Holperin; Robert Jauch; Chris Larson; Julie Lassa; Mark Miller; Fred Risser; Lena Taylor; Kathleen Vinehout; Robert Wirch	Governor Scott Walker Wisconsin Republican Legislature figures: Senate Majority Leader Scott Fitzgerald; President of the Senate Michael Ellis; Assembly Speaker Jeff Fitzgerald; Assembly Majority Leader Scott Suder

Number
Protesters: 100,000+	Counter protesters: Several thousand

Casualties and losses
Arrests: 10+	

From February to June 2011 in the US state of Wisconsin, as many as 100,000 protesters demonstrated their opposition to 2011 Wisconsin Act 10, also called the Wisconsin Budget Repair Bill. The bill proposed significantly limiting the compensation and rights, including collective bargaining, of public employees in the state.

Protests against the bill centered on the Wisconsin State Capitol in Madison, with satellite protests also occurring at other municipalities throughout the state. Demonstrations also took place at the University of Wisconsin–Madison and the University of Wisconsin–Milwaukee. After the bill was upheld by the Wisconsin Supreme Court on June 14, the number of protesters declined to about 1,000 within a couple of days.

The protests were a major driving force for recall elections of state senators in 2011 and 2012, the failed recall of Governor Scott Walker in 2012 and a contentious Wisconsin Supreme Court election in 2011.

== Background ==
Wisconsin was the first state in the United States to provide collective bargaining rights to public employees in 1959. That year, the state's public-sector employee law was revised to not only allow municipal employees to unionize, but also to require municipal employers to bargain with certified unions. Over the past decades public sector labor unions had grown from 10.8% of public workers being represented by a union in 1960 to 36.2% in 2010. Over the same time period, the percentage of private sector employees in a union shrank from 31.9% to 6.9%. This increase in public-employee unionism coincided with the granting of collective bargaining rights to public employees. Total union membership for all employees, both public and private, had decreased substantially over the years, with total union membership in 2010 at 11.4%.

When Jim Doyle, a Democrat, was governor (2003–2010), the state's budget deficits were filled three times by taking money from the transportation fund, in amounts totaling $1.257 billion. Subsequently, 53 counties throughout the state passed referendums to prevent government officials from taking money from the transportation fund for use in other projects.

In the 2010 gubernatorial race, Republican candidate Scott Walker and his Democratic opponent Tom Barrett each stated that they would not close the budget deficit by taking money from the transportation fund. Walker proposed that state employees pay more toward their pensions, saying it would save the state about $180 million a year. Walker was elected as governor in November 2010.

Under collective-bargaining agreements, employers and unions had negotiated health insurance considerations. In 2011, contributions for health insurance of active employees totaled 38.8% of wages, while for private-sector workers nationwide the average was 10.7%. Some public-sector unions also provided health insurance for retirees. This is especially the case for teachers in many states, due to eligibility rules of their pension plans and Medicare. According to David Cay Johnston, prior to Act 10, Wisconsin state employers paid 5% of employee wages into their pension as was negotiated under the principle of "deferred compensation."

In January 2011, the state legislature passed a series of bills providing additional tax cuts and deductions for businesses at "a two-year cost of $67 million". In early February, the Walker administration had projected a $3.6 billion budget shortfall in 2013 and a $137 million shortfall for the fiscal year ending June 30, 2011. The Walker-backed bill proposed to alleviate the budget shortfall included taking away the ability of public sector unions to bargain collectively for pensions and health care, limiting pay raises of public employees to the rate of inflation, ending automatic union dues collection by the state, and requiring public unions to recertify annually. The bargaining changes exempted the unions of public safety officers, including police, firefighters, and state troopers. Walker stated that without the cuts, thousands of state workers would have to be laid off.

Protests and demonstrations began following Walker's introduction of Assembly Bill 11 to the Wisconsin State Assembly on February 14, 2011.

== Protests ==
=== February ===
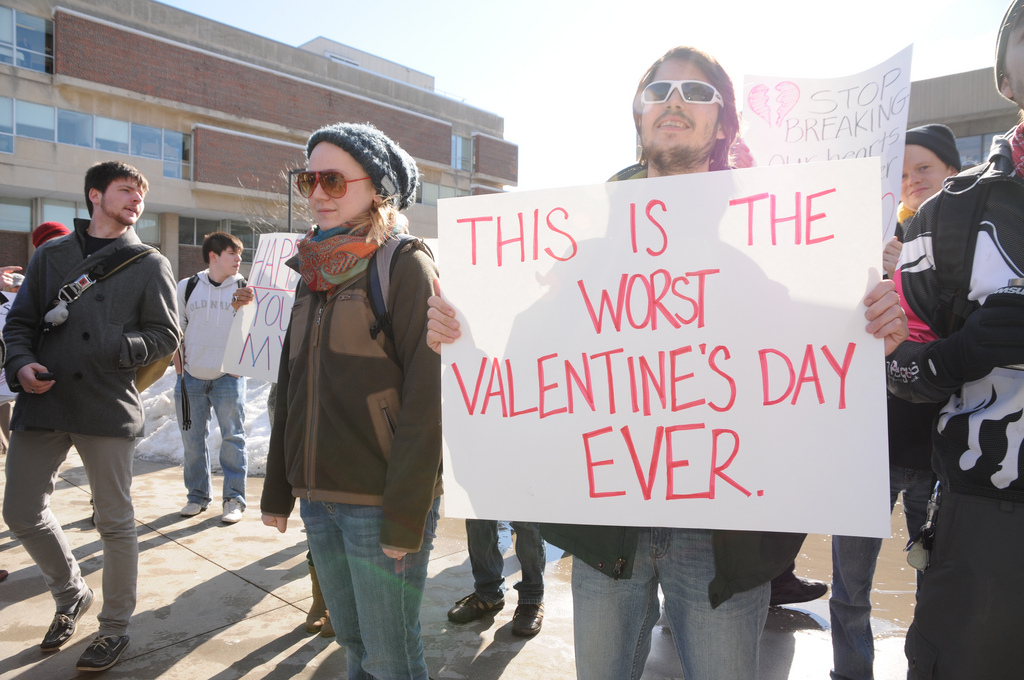
Students and workers rally at Spaights Plaza on the University of Wisconsin-Milwaukee campus, Monday, February 14, 2011

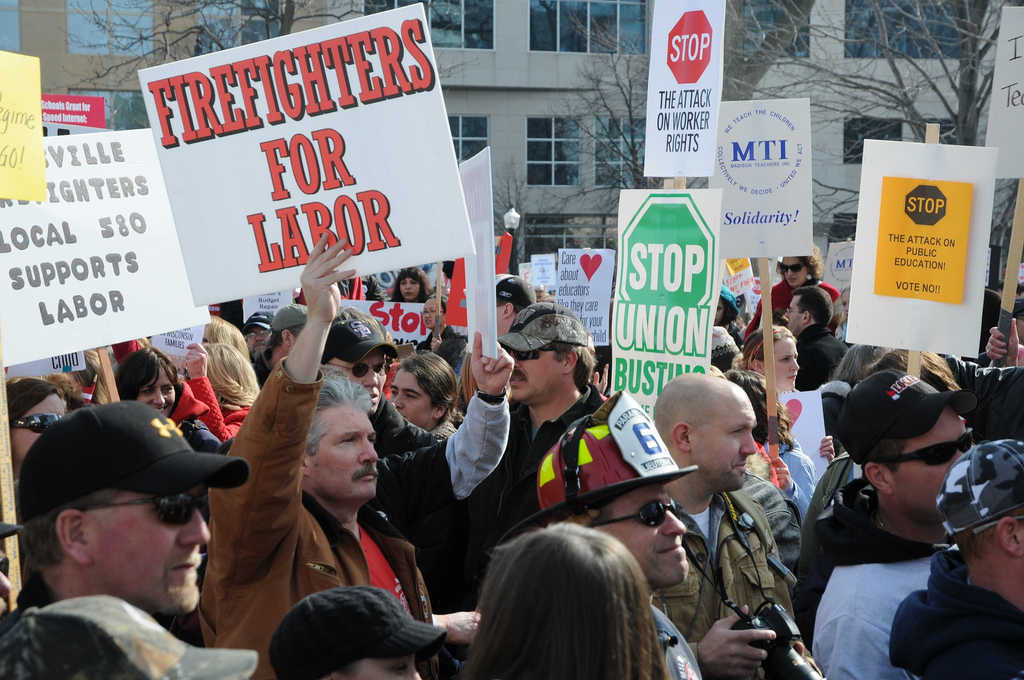
Firefighters led the protest into the Wisconsin State Capitol on February 16, 2011

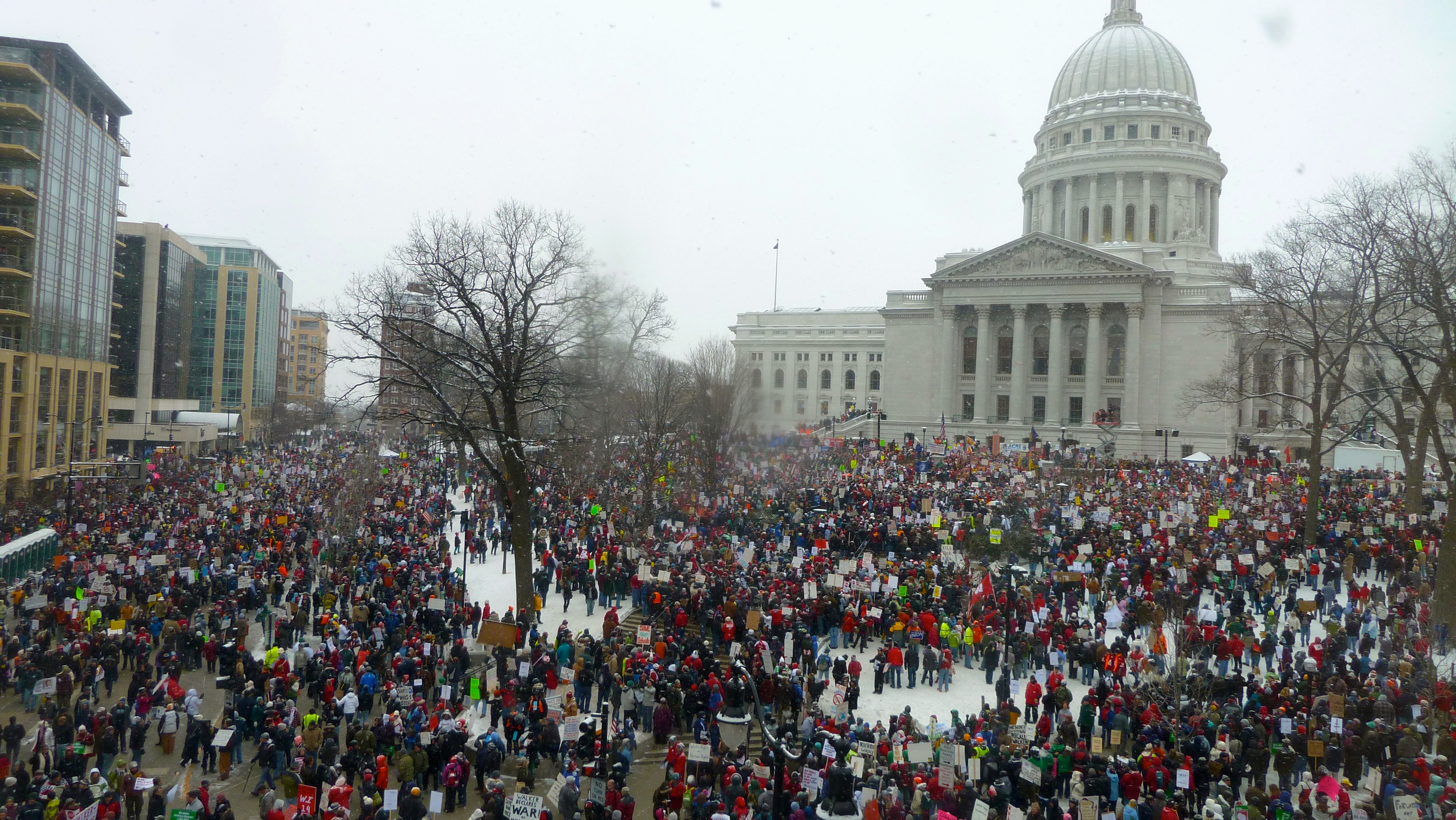
Thousands gather outside of the Wisconsin Capitol building to protest Governor Walker's bill. The gathering is estimated at 70,000 to 100,000 people.

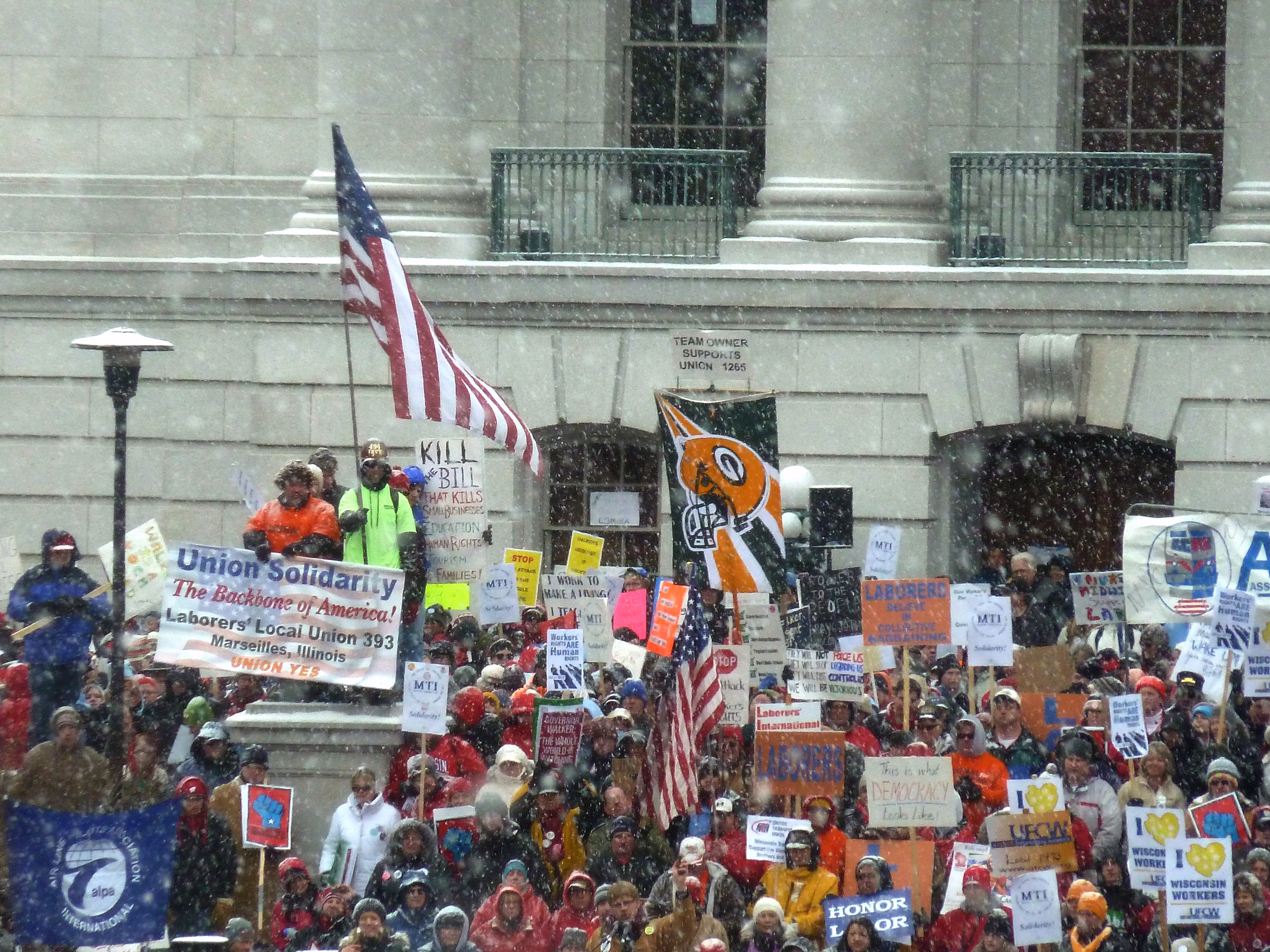
Demonstrators in steadily falling snow outside of the Wisconsin Capitol building

On Monday, February 14, the University of Wisconsin–Madison's Teaching Assistants Association distributed "We ♥ UW: Don't Break My ♥" Valentine cards to the governor, as a means of protesting the bill's negative impacts on working conditions at the university.

On February 15, tens of thousands of protesters demonstrated in and around the Capitol building in Madison regarding the proposed legislation's limitations on collective bargaining for and against Walker's bill. "Kill the Bill" remained one of the main slogans of the protesters. That same day, union members, students and private-sector citizens took part in public hearings with the senators and representatives from both parties, which lasted 17 hours; some defenders of the bill expressed their position, but most participants opposed the bill.

By February 16, the number of protesters in front of the Wisconsin State Capitol was estimated at 30,000.

On February 17, about 25,000 people continued the protest. Citing concerns that Republicans were attempting to pass the legislation without scheduling adequate time for public review and debate, Senate Minority Leader Mark Miller led the 14 Senate Democrats in fleeing the state to prevent the quorum necessary for a vote on the Budget Repair Bill. On the same day, the protests spread to Columbus, Ohio, where about 3,800 protesters demonstrated against a similar bill to "eliminate collective bargaining" being considered by the Ohio legislature. According to Mike Lux, some protesters in the two states carried Egyptian flags, indicating their Egyptian revolution inspiration. Ed Schultz of MSNBC's The Ed Show appeared live outside the Wisconsin State Capitol on February 17 and 18.

On February 18, the AFL–CIO president, Richard Trumka, and other state labor leaders addressed the protest crowd on the Capitol lawn. Trumka asserted that Governor Walker's plan was part of a larger national Republican strategy. The number of protesters in Madison grew to over 70,000 on February 19, including some who supported Walker's plan.

On February 19, 11 faculty members from the University of Wisconsin's School of Medicine and Public Health established a "medical station" at the capitol, and signed sick notes for public employees abandoning their public post in order to protest. This shut down several school districts in the state.

By February 20, protestors had undertaken a physical occupation of the Capitol building, establishing a fully functioning community within the public spaces of the Wisconsin State Capitol, including an information center, a sleeping area, a medic station staffed by members of the Madison Community Wellness Collective, and food stations with food for protestors supplied by local businesses. Protestors also covered the walls of the Capitol with thousands of homemade signs. On February 20, a union organizer participating in the protests said that the protests would continue "as long as it takes." Other union leaders called for teachers to return to work. During this timeframe several members of the teaching and project assistant union of UW-Madison (TAA-Madison) designed and implemented "Defend Wisconsin", a web site to help coordinate rallies, publish video footage by protesters, and relay general information about the bill and protests.

On February 22, Assembly Republicans began procedures to move the bill to a vote while Democrats submitted dozens of amendments and conducted speeches.

Also on February 22, Walker delivered a state address on the Budget Repair Bill.

On February 22–23, the public information officer for the Madison Police Department (whose union was participating in the protests), claimed "almost all" of the protesters were from Wisconsin, while an independent reporter from the Daily Cardinal estimated one in four of the protesters were from outside the state.

On February 23, Buffalo Beast editor Ian Murphy placed a prank telephone call to Walker claiming to be billionaire David Koch, one of Walker's largest corporate supporters. During the 20-minute call, Walker discussed a method of getting the absent Senators to return, rejected placing agent provocateurs among the protesters, and that he spoke daily with like-minded Ohio Governor John Kasich. Walker's office later confirmed that the recording of the call was genuine, and stated, "The phone call shows that the Governor says the same thing in private as he does in public and the lengths that others will go to disrupt the civil debate Wisconsin is having." Two local public officials, including Madison Mayor Dave Cieslewicz, expressed concern that Walker's comments could be considered ethics violations.

In the aftermath of the call, Senate Democrats refused requests from Governor Walker to return to Wisconsin and negotiate a compromise. Some characterized their wariness as a consequence of the fake call.

On February 23, the 14 Senators who fled the Wisconsin Capitol were seen at a hotel near Chicago.

At 1:00 am on February 25, following sixty hours of debate, the final amendments had been defeated and the Republican leadership of the Wisconsin State Assembly cut off debate as well as the public hearing and moved quickly to pass the budget repair bill in a sudden vote. The vote was 51 in favor and 17 opposed, with 28 representatives not voting. The final vote took place without warning, and the time allowed for voting was so short (lasting only 5–15 s) that fewer than half of the Democratic representatives were able to vote; many reportedly pushed the voting button as hard as possible but it did not register. Four Republican representatives voted against the bill.

On February 25, following rumors that the Capitol building would be closed and the protesters moved out, the head of the state's largest police union issued a statement urging Governor Walker to keep the Capitol open. Jim Palmer, the executive director of the Wisconsin Professional Police Association, went on to state that his organization stood with the protesters, despite the fact that law enforcement officers were exempt from the budget repair bill's collective bargaining changes. Palmer then called on off-duty officers to sleep in the Capitol that evening. Later that day, the Department of Administration announced that the Capitol building would remain open.

On February 26, between 70,000 and 100,000 protested the proposed budget in Madison. They were joined by thousands at state capitals around the nation. Out of state union supporters continued to join the protests to show their support, with hundreds of protesters being bused by New York Teamsters.

Appearing on Meet the Press on February 27, Governor Walker said he did not believe the unions were sincere in offering the pension and health care concessions because local unions had recently pushed through contracts with school boards and city councils that did not include contributions to the pensions and health care, and that in one case, the contract actually included a pay increase.

On February 27, it was reported by the media that Republican State Senator Dale Schultz would not vote for the bill. However, Schultz refused to let his own intentions be known regarding the bill; he had previously attempted a compromise budget plan, which was rejected by Governor Walker.

On February 28, Democratic Representative Gordon Hintz formally apologized for threatening remarks made to Republican Representative Michelle Litjens on the Assembly floor following the vote. On February 28, the largest public union filed an unfair labor practices complaint with the state labor relations board, claiming that Walker had a duty to negotiate, but had refused.

=== March ===
On March 3, police found 41 rounds of 22-caliber rifle ammunition outside the Wisconsin state Capitol. Ammunition was also found inside a city and county government building in downtown Madison. That same day security at the Capitol had become so restrictive that a team of firefighters responding to an emergency call were denied access to the building. On the same night, Rep. Nick Milroy (D-WI) was tackled by law enforcement officers while attempting to enter the Capitol to retrieve clothes. Milroy said in a statement that "no harm was done," but criticized the "armed-palace environment created by Gov. Walker." Also that same day, after occupation of the Capitol for more than two weeks, the final group of pro-union protesters left the building peacefully after Dane County Circuit Judge John Albert ordered their removal. The judge ruled that activists could not stay in the building overnight, but he ordered authorities to end the lockdown on the building and restore normal access by March 6.

On March 4, Governor Walker threatened to send layoff notices to 1,500 state employees if the budget repair bill was not passed. According to Walker, this move was needed to save the state $30 million. However, in the February 28 phone call, Walker had discussed using the threat of layoffs as a political weapon to put pressure on the Senate Democrats, saying "We might ratchet that up a little bit, you know."

On March 5, filmmaker Michael Moore spoke to a crowd of 50,000 protesters, drawing cheers from the crowd as he repeatedly said, "America is not broke," and adding, "The country is awash in wealth and cash. It's just that it's not in your hands. It has been transferred, in the greatest heist in history, from the workers and consumers to the banks and the portfolios of the uber-rich."

The Wisconsin Senate amended the bill to remove financial items, allowing it to be passed without a quorum. This allowed Republicans to pass the bill without Democrats present on March 9. None of the 14 Democrats were present for the vote. Senator Schultz was the lone "Nay" vote, with the other 17 Republicans voting to pass the amended bill. The amended bill was then sent to the Assembly.

On Thursday, March 10, the Wisconsin Assembly passed the amended collective bargaining bill with a vote of 53–42. Protesters and Assembly Democrats shouted "shame!" as the Republicans quickly filed out of the building. Assembly Minority Leader Peter Barca filed a complaint the following morning with the Dane County district attorney charging that the Joint Conference Committee that convened at 6 pm Wednesday and passed an amended version of Gov. Scott Walker's budget repair bill was in violation of the open meetings law. The complaint stated that Assembly Speaker Jeff Fitzgerald and his brother, Senate Majority Leader Scott Fitzgerald and others "knowingly attended the meeting in violation of the Open Meetings law" and were subject to penalties identified in state statute. The complaint asked that the actions taken at the meeting be declared void. Democrats promised to sue to overturn the law. The 18 Republican state senators who voted for the law received death threats.

Shortly afterwards, hundreds of protesters gathered outside the locked entrance to the Capitol, chanting "Break down the door!" and "General strike!" The crowds grew to thousands, surging into the Capitol. Police did not attempt to remove them. Department of Administration spokesman Tim Donovan said although protesters were being encouraged to leave, no one would be forcibly removed. Madison Mayor Dave Cieslewicz said he had instructed Madison Police Chief Noble Wray not to allow his officers to participate in removing demonstrators from the building.

Katherine R. Windels of Cross Plains, Wisconsin sent death threat e-mails to Republican lawmakers the same day the legislation passed, and was arrested and charged with two felony and two misdemeanor counts by the Dane County district attorney.

==== Governor Walker's response ====
In the opinion section of The Wall Street Journal on March 10, 2011, Governor Walker expressed his reasons for "fighting in Wisconsin". He started his message discussing a teacher from Milwaukee Public Schools, Megan Sampson, who was named Outstanding Teacher of the Year (Walker was not truthful about the teacher's title), but received a layoff notice a week later. He stated that the collective-bargaining contract requires staffing decisions to be made based on seniority and she got a layoff notice because the union leadership would not accept reasonable changes to their contract. Instead, according to Walker, they hid behind a collective-bargaining agreement that cost the taxpayers $101,091 per year for each teacher, protected a 0% contribution for health-insurance premiums, and forced schools to hire and fire based on seniority and union rules. Walker's budget-repair bill would reform the union-controlled hiring and firing process by allowing school districts to assign staff based on merit and performance. He stated that most states in the country are facing major budget deficits. Many are cutting billions of dollars of aid to schools and local governments, and that these cuts lead to massive layoffs or increases in property taxes—or both. His proposal gave state and local governments the tools to balance the budget through reasonable benefit contributions. In total, Walker said the budget-repair bill saves local governments almost $1.5 billion, outweighing the reductions in state aid in the budget. He added that the unions claim they are willing to accept concessions, but their actions spoke louder than their words. During the three weeks following the publication of the opinion piece, local unions across the state pursued contracts without new pension or health-insurance contributions.

Walker cited Governor Mitch Daniels as an example for his own budget repair when they repealed collective bargaining in Indiana in 2005, and claims it helped government become more efficient and responsive. He said the average pay for Indiana state employees has actually increased, and high-performing employees are rewarded with pay increases or bonuses when they do something exceptional and that passage of the budget-repair bill will help put similar reforms into place in Wisconsin.

==== Post-passage reactions ====
On March 11, Governor Walker signed the bill and put out a statement rescinding layoff notices for 1,500 public workers. He said the bill's passage "helped us save 1,500 middle-class jobs by moving forward this week with the budget repair. The state will now be able to realize $30 million in savings to balance the budget and allow 1,500 state employees to keep their jobs." In response, Dane County Executive Kathleen Falk filed a lawsuit against the state regarding the bill, stating that it was unconstitutionally passed because the budget repair bill contained fiscal provisions. Judge Amy Smith recused herself from hearing the case, which was instead heard by Judge Maryann Sumi. A second lawsuit was filed against the state on similar grounds on March 16 by Dane County District Attorney Ismael Ozanne. The Wisconsin Secretary of State, Doug La Follette, a Democrat, delayed publishing the law as long as possible under the law.

On March 12, the fourteen Democratic senators who had left the state returned and were met by crowds of between 85,000 and 185,000, the largest crowds yet of the four weeks of protests. Teachers, police, firefighters, nurses, and students were joined by farmers who paraded their farm vehicles around Capitol Square. One of the returning senators, Spencer Coggs, said that "[w]e are back to unite and fight with our supporters. We gave them hope. They gave us inspiration." In contrast, senate majority leader Scott Fitzgerald said that the returning senators were "the most shameful 14 people in the state of Wisconsin [...] an absolute insult to the hundreds of thousands of Wisconsinites who are struggling to find a job, much less one they can run away from and go down to Illinois."

On March 18, Dane County judge Maryann Sumi issued a stay on the collective bargaining bill in response to the lawsuit by Dane County District Attorney Ismael Ozanne. Ozanne had argued that the legislative committee violated the state's open meetings law, and that the budget repair bill was illegally passed because it contained budgetary provisions (and hence required a quorum). Sumi stated that the lawsuit was "likely to succeed on the merits." The judge's action did not prevent the legislature from meeting again and approving the bill a second time.

On March 25, an additional lawsuit was filed against the state alleging that the budget repair bill still contained budget provisions, and hence was unlawfully passed by the state as it would have required a quorum. Also on March 25, after meeting with Senate Republicans, the Legislative Reference Bureau bypassed the Secretary of State's office and officially published the collective bargaining law. There had been a court-issued restraining order restricting its publication, but the order was issued against the Secretary of State's office instead of the Bureau. According to the director of the Bureau, the publication is a purely ministerial act that forwards the bill to the Secretary of State; the bill needs to be published by the Secretary of State to become law. Despite this, Republicans claimed the bill was officially law and planned to enforce it. On March 29, Judge Maryann Sumi ruled the bill had not become law, and public officials who attempted to enforce it risked legal sanctions. On April 14, Judge Sumi threw out the lawsuit against the collective bargaining law sought by Dane County Acting Executive Kathleen Falk and Dane County Board Chairman Scott McDonnell. Judge Sumi ruled that an "arm of the state can not sue the state."

=== April ===
On April 9, demonstrators marched from the Capitol to the offices of the state business lobby, Wisconsin Manufacturers and Commerce. The action was sparked in part by attention given to Charles and David Koch, billionaire brothers and conservative activists, who had supported Governor Walker.

On April 13, the Hudson, Wisconsin Board of Education announced punishments ranging from one-day unpaid suspensions up to 15 days for teachers who called in sick on February 18, forcing their schools to close during the protests over the budget repair bill.

On April 16, Sarah Palin attended a Tea Party rally in Madison. Speaking to the crowd, Palin stated, "Your governor did the right thing and you won! Your beautiful state won! And people still have their jobs!" The now deceased conservative blogger Andrew Breitbart spoke at the event and told labor supporters engaged in counter-protests, "Go to hell! You're trying to divide America!" Police estimated that about 6,500 people attended the event including Tea Party supporters and those demonstrating against the Walker administration policies.

On April 20, the Milwaukee Journal-Sentinel reported costs associated with the protests. The Department of Natural Resources reported costs for personnel topped $350,000, and the parking tab for police to park their vehicles approached $100,000.

On April 26, University of Wisconsin-Madison School of Medicine and Public Health announced the discipline of 11 faculty members who distributed fake sick notes to public workers in order to protest, as well as twenty other doctors. The State of Wisconsin Medical Board disciplined seven doctors after receiving 300 complaints: Adam H. Balin, Mark B. Beamsley, Hannah M. Keevil, Bernard F. Micke, Kathleen A. Oriel, James H. Shropshire, and Louis A. Sanner. Dr. Louis A. Sanner was identified as the fraud ringleader. Ten student residents were given written reprimands.

On April 28, it was reported that some of the doctors at the University of Wisconsin who gave out sick notes to union supporters skipping work to protest would face punishment ranging from written reprimands to docked pay and loss of leadership positions. The Medical Examining Board and state Department of Licensing and Regulation investigated the doctors. The medical school reviewed 22 doctors said to have been involved in giving medical excuses to protesters at the Capitol. At least a dozen doctors received disciplinary action in late April or early May. Some of the doctors appealed, and most cases were resolved by early July. The Wisconsin Medical Society criticized the doctors' actions, saying they threatened the public's trust in the medical profession. The state Department of Safety and Professional Services reviewed 11 doctors said to have written sick notes and launched formal investigations into eight of them. Sick notes that appeared to come from doctors at the protests were submitted by 84 teachers. The Madison School District denied a Wisconsin State Journal request to view the notes – with the teachers' names removed – under the state's open records law. The newspaper sued to have the notes released with a lawsuit now pending. The Madison School District could not release the notes at that time, as the notes were evidence in an investigation of two additional doctors who were later found guilty.

=== May ===
On May 12, 100 pages of public records were released that detailed the emotions and threats that occurred during the protests. The vast majority were determined to present "no criminal nexus or viable threat," but a few remained open as cases with the Division of Criminal Investigation. Of the 78 actions made public, about 30 were directed at Democrats, a few less at Walker and other Republicans, and the balance consisted of vague or implied threats against no specific target, or concerns over demonstrators.

On May 14, the Wisconsin Department of Administration estimated overtime and cleanup costs for the protests will reach about $8 million, of which $270,000 was marked for interior and exterior Capitol building repairs caused by accelerated wear and tear. However, an investigation by Politifact on March 11 revealed that the Administration submitted a revised estimate of $347,500 after the original high estimate memo was released. The same day, between 10,000 and 15,000 protesters participated in a rally protesting the collective bargaining bill, education cuts, BadgerCare cuts and immigrant rights. Christian Pacheco, a graduating high school senior, revealed at the protest that he was an illegal immigrant student. "My dream is to work hard and go to a UW school just like my peers", said Pacheco. "If I am force [sic] to pay out of state tuition, out of my pocket, as Walker's budget proposes this dream will be crushed." The crowd chanted in support of Pacheco of shedding light into his experiences as an illegal immigrant.

=== June ===
On June 2 in Madison, a blood drive sponsored by the Red Cross had to be rescheduled due to loud singing by anti-Walker protesters. The singers later apologized and said they would sing outside the Capitol during the rescheduled event and that they would donate blood to help make up for any lost donations.

On June 8 in Madison, pro-union protesters dressed as zombies and caused some concerns during an event where the Governor honored the accomplishments of members of the Special Olympics. The organizers of the ceremony said the demonstration had not disrupted their event. The protest occurred the same day Capitol Police removed a dozen protesters dressed as zombies from the office of Representative Robin Vos (R-Rochester) and arrested them. Senator Tim Carpenter (D-Milwaukee) issued a statement praising most demonstrators for being engaged in government but chiding a few for crossing the line in recent weeks.

Protesters began living in tents around the Capitol in a complex they deemed "Walkerville" around the time the 2012 fiscal year budget was being debated.

On June 14, The Wisconsin Supreme Court unanimously found Judge Maryann Sumi breached separation of powers when she blocked a bill in the Legislature, and submitted opinions on the open meetings law based along partisan lines. The controversial bill was then reinstated. On June 15, all the public unions in Wisconsin sued Walker in federal court, claiming collective bargaining rights are protected under the First Amendment, but the case never went to trial.

Around 3 a.m. on June 16, the Wisconsin State Assembly passed the 2012 fiscal year budget with a party line vote of 60–38. During the Senate debate, an onlooker was removed after screaming "Fascist" repeatedly at Republican Senator Glenn Grothman while he was speaking. The Senate subsequently approved the 2012 fiscal year budget later that day, with a party line vote of 19–14. Shortly after the vote, an onlooker repeatedly screamed "I want my democracy back!" and others screamed repeatedly "Kill the bill!" The screaming onlookers were removed shortly, except for the ones who chained themselves to the railing, who were later arrested.

On June 27, Wisconsin Supreme Court Justice Ann Walsh Bradley filed a criminal complaint that claimed fellow Justice David Prosser "put her in a chokehold" on June 13. Other justices who claimed they witnessed the event were divided along partisan lines, with one side claiming Prosser attacked Bradley, and the other side claiming Bradley attacked Prosser. Two separate investigations resulted in no charges against either Prosser or Bradley.

==== Decline in protests ====
The size of protests continued to decline during June. A number of events have been linked to the decrease in momentum of the protests, including the election of David Prosser to the state Supreme Court, the decision at the state supreme court on the collective bargaining law, and passage of Walker's budget in the state legislature. Matthew Rothschild, editor of The Progressive magazine said "People see that Walker won everything big that he asked for, and despite all the great activism, we don't have anything to show for it. The mass protests that I expected this week at the Capitol in Madison did not materialize." By June 14, the number of protesters at the Capitol was approximately 5,000 and by June 16 the number was down to about 1,000.

=== Law enforcement actions ===
When first announcing the budget repair bill on February 11, Walker said that the National Guard and other state agencies were prepared for any fallout including a walk-out by state prison guards. Although unable to cross state lines, Wisconsin State Patrol officers were sent to find the fleeing lawmakers.

On February 14, Sgt. Dave McClurg, vice president of the Madison Police Officers' Unions stated "Madison police will be in attendance both to protest and, possibly, to help with crowd control. McClurg says there have been some discussions about Madison police performing in this capacity, which he admits would not be "comfortable."

The City of Madison Police Spokesman Joel DeSpain issued a press-release on March 5, noting for the third weekend in a row that demonstrations had been peaceful. He said that there has been no arrests and no citations during the start of the weekend (March 4 and 5) where tens of thousands of protesters were present.

In March, a paid signature gatherer working for the Republican party was cited for theft when he stole items belonging to a couple visiting Lambeau Field. Police identified him from video footage and confronted him a few days later. He had a criminal record from Colorado (his home state) and "was staying at the Road Star Inn in Ashwaubenon with several other out-of-town canvassers" working to recall Democratic State Senator Dave Hansen.

In April, Katherine R. Windels, aged 26, from Cross Plains, Wisconsin was charged with two felonies for allegedly sending death-threat emails to Republican state Senators.

FBI agents from Maine to California to Florida were involved regarding 100 pages of public records that were released, which detailed the emotions and threats that occurred during the protests. One man tweeted that he prayed an anvil would fall from the sky onto Walker. A suspect in Maine was arrested after sending letters to that state's Republican U.S. senators suggesting Walker should be killed and that all Republican governors resign. A Burbank, California resident who sent a long email offering a $50,000 bounty for Walker was interviewed by federal agents who determined he was mentally challenged and not a true threat. Police in Nebraska tracked down a man who posted to a Wisconsin man's Facebook page that he expected the shooting to start soon and that he would be ready to inflict nonlethal shots so others could hear screams. He told officers he got "carried away", hadn't intend to harm anyone and has never been to Wisconsin.

A Stevens Point man called the State Police after he heard his accountant, whose wife is a teacher, remark that if Walker didn't stop attacking teachers unions he'd be assassinated. An agent interviewed the accountant and determined there was no threat.

On June 8, a dozen silent demonstrators wearing zombie makeup and protest T-shirts were arrested after lying down on the floor of a legislator's Capitol offices and refusing to leave. Police carried out the demonstrators "one by one" after the group spent about half an hour in the offices of Representative Robin Vos (R-Rochester).

On June 16, two protesters were arrested after locking themselves onto the Senate gallery railing with bike locks. Later in the day six other people in the Capitol had been arrested on allegations of disorderly conduct.

On August 25, 13 protesters were arrested after they refused to leave the capitol after the designated 7 pm closing time. The protest came on the first day that higher pension and health contributions kick in for state employees.

In December 2011, a man was recorded threatening a Recall Walker signature gatherer. He was later charged with disorderly conduct for doing so.

=== State supreme court election ===
The state supreme court race between 12-year incumbent David Prosser, Jr. and challenger Assistant Attorney General JoAnne Kloppenburg was widely seen as a referendum on Governor Walker's proposed budget reforms in Wisconsin, with labor organizations and tea party groups explicitly making the connection while Governor Walker himself stating it was not. On Tuesday, April 5, one seat in the Wisconsin Supreme Court was up for election. At the time, the court had a conservative majority of 4-2-1 with Prosser identifying as a conservative and the seventh justice considered a swing vote. Both candidates stated their unhappiness with the increasingly partisan nature of the race. Following a recount, the Wisconsin Government Accountability Board confirmed Prosser won the election.

=== Outside Madison ===
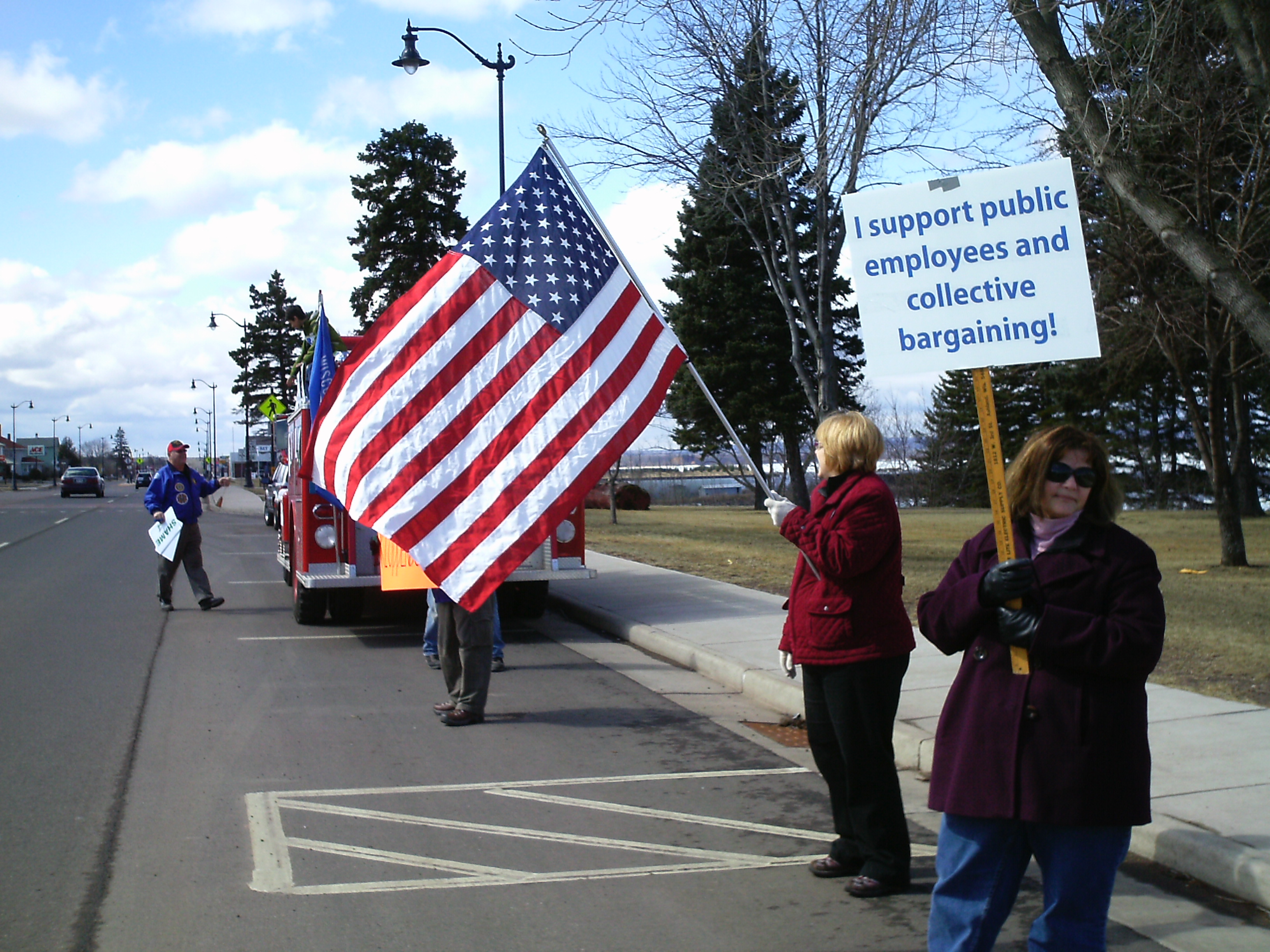
Protests occurred in parts of the state that are a great distance from Madison, as shown in this photo of some protesters in the northern Wisconsin city of Ashland.

Though the protest efforts are focused in Madison, there have been smaller protests throughout the rest of the state as well, with pro-union supporters as well as Walker supporters.

==== Union contract extension protests ====
In various localities throughout the state, communities determined whether to extend or not to extend union contracts before Governor Walker's budget repair bill took effect. In Wauwatosa, the common council voted not to ratify tentative agreements with the public works, dispatcher, clerical and fire unions after a crowd of about 100 people turned out, most urging city officials to wait until the governor's proposed state budget-repair bill became law. However, the council reconvened for a second time within a month to reconsider extending the contracts with both supporters and opponents lined up to speak at the special meeting held to reopen the discussion of the labor contracts, with the council voting 8–7 to extend the contracts. The mayor subsequently vetoed the measure and criticized the council's decision to take the approach they did to policy making.

In Menomonee Falls, a majority of residents in attendance opposed a contract by a margin of nearly 5-to-1 against the ratification of new contracts, urging the board to wait, however it was passed after four hours of debate with members of the community shouting "shame" because the board approved the union contract extension. The Menomonee Falls School District and the teachers reached a tentative agreement on a two-year contract settlement. The board room was packed, and 50 to 75 more were gathered in the library watching the meeting on a live feed. Residents pleaded for the board to table the vote on the contract until more information could be gathered regarding the new contract. Residents said they wanted time to review the contract, discuss and debate it. The board signed a privacy provision with the teachers union in October before negotiations began. It restricted the board from releasing the actual 80-page contract document to the public before both the board and the teachers union approved it. The agreement also guaranteed a "yes" vote from two board members who are on the negotiating team. Even if the vote were delayed a week as requested, board members explained that they still would not be able to release the full contract document for the public to view. The board was unable to tell residents how much the co-pay for teachers would be with their new insurance provider. "We have to rely on our other board members", one board member said. "But in fairness to everyone, I will probably read it, but I will not read anything I don't already know." One local resident said of the actions by the school board, "What we have here is a major trust problem, and nobody trusts you right now." If the courts ruled the bill was law when Walker signed it, the law would become retroactive to that date, and this contract becomes void. If the law isn't enacted until after the vote, this contract would be valid for the duration of the agreement.

Some unions were hoping to beat the deadline for the state's new collective bargaining law and get a new deal done. The Brown Deer School Board called for an emergency meeting the night before the budget repair law became effective to see if it could reach a last-minute deal with the teachers union. Dozens of Brown Deer taxpayers worried the board was going to rush through a teachers' contract before the law became effective. When asked if the teachers' union was trying to rush a deal to beat the deadline, Lisa Albers with the Brown Deer Education Association said: "I think rushing sounds a little bit harsh. The whole thing was we would work together and come to a common agreement." However, the board adjourned saying it needed more time. "We intend to make sure that we look at the governor's repair bill, said board president Gary Williams, "whatever we proposed will be consistent with the governor's repair bill."

==== Boycotts ====
Boycotts were implemented by opponents of Governor Walker's budget repair bill and other reforms by boycotting businesses whose executives had made political contributions to Walker. Boycotters said they wanted the companies to take a public position on Walker's bill, but some of the boycotted businesses did not do so. M&I Bank, one of the boycotted businesses, issued a statement that its employees contributed to both candidates in the last election. One labor union consortium consisting of the state's largest police and fire unions, along with some local teachers unions, urged their members to engage in what it characterized as "voluntary consumer activism" if M&I would not support collective bargaining. Shortly thereafter, "Miracle on the Hudson" pilot Jeffrey Skiles withdrew hundreds of thousands of dollars from his M&I accounts. Following the consortium's effort, David Galloway, the chairman of BMO Financial, which was in the process of purchasing M&I bank, stated that he supported "employees' rights to collectively bargain" after facing repeated questions on the subject at a March 22 shareholders' meeting in Vancouver.

There was an effort by the Wisconsin State Employees Union to circulate letters to businesses in southeast Wisconsin urging them to support workers’ rights by putting up a sign in their windows. If businesses failed to comply, the letter advised, "Failure to do so will leave us no choice but (to) do a public boycott of your business. And sorry, neutral means 'no' to those who work for the largest employer in the area and are union members." One local business owner said "I was just disappointed; I didn't like the tone of the letter. To me, it bordered on strong-arm tactics." Another business owner put up a sign that read "We Support Union Grove Not Bully Tactics".

== Public opinion ==
=== During the protest period ===
Polls during this period differed by the political bias of pollster. For example, one poll would indicate 64% of Americans felt public employees should not be represented by public unions, when other would indicate that 61% of Americans would oppose a law similar to the Wisconsin bill in their state while 33% were for it. A Rasmussen poll of Wisconsin voters conducted on March 2, 2011 reported that 39% support weakening collective bargaining rights while 52% oppose the idea. A majority said they supported the Democrats (52%) or the unions (56%) in the current dispute, while 41–44% supported Walker's position. Asked whether state workers should be given a 10% pay cut, 44% said yes, while 38% oppose a pay cut. Polling analyst Nate Silver criticized methodology of the Rasmussen polls in his The New York Times blog, claiming that it had biased questions, giving a misleadingly negative impression of the protesters.

In an analysis of several concurrent public opinion polls, pollster Scott Rasmussen identified the source of seeming contradictions in the results. The results depended on the way the questions are worded. If the collective bargaining issue was worded in the context of balancing the state budget, Governor Walker does better. If the question is worded more narrowly, mentioning only the collective bargaining dispute, the unions fare better. A Pulse Opinion Research poll conducted of likely Wisconsin voters found that 56% support collective bargaining rights for public employees with 32% opposed. In the same poll, approval and disapproval for the bill was split at 50%–50% while 49% supported the protesters and 48% opposed them.

A Public Policy Polling poll of Wisconsin voters found that given a chance to vote in a rematch between Walker and 2010 Democratic nominee Tom Barrett, Walker would have lost 45%–52%. (In the actual election, Walker won 52–46%.) The poll's analysis characterized the shift as the result of changing opinions due to the budget protests. Public Policy Polling (PPP) is a Democratic Party-affiliated polling firm based in Raleigh, North Carolina.

A SUSA poll in the districts of Republican senators Dan Kapanke and Randy Hopper found that double-digit margins in both districts would vote to recall the Senators.

On March 15, PPP conducted a poll for Daily Kos in the districts of all eight Republican senators being recalled. The poll found that three trailed generic Democratic candidates, three had small leads, and two were safe:

- Senator Glenn Grothman leads 60%–32%.
- Senator Mary Lazich leads 56%–34%
- Senator Alberta Darling leads 52%–44%
- Senator Sheila Harsdorf leads 48%–44%
- Senator Robert Cowles leads 45%–43%
- Senator Luther Olsen trails 47%–49%
- Senator Randy Hopper trails 44%–49%
- Senator Dan Kapanke trails 41%–55%

Wisconsin Public Radio released several polls April 22 related to the Wisconsin protests:

- 57% said they believed the proposed legislation was more about decreasing the power of public sector unions, 31% said it was about decreasing the budget deficit, with 12% saying they weren't sure.
- 61% said public employees should have the right to collectively bargain for wages, while 35% were opposed.
- 54% said public employees should have the right to collectively bargain for health and retirement benefits, while 42% were opposed.
- 70% said they had a favorable opinion of public school teachers in Wisconsin and 24% with an unfavorable view.
- 59% said they disapproved of Democratic efforts compared to 33% who approved.
- 49% said they disapproved of Republican efforts compared to 39% who approved.
- 46% said they had a favorable impression of state Democratic lawmakers, while 48% had an unfavorable opinion.
- 45% said they had a favorable impression of state Republican lawmakers, while 46% had an unfavorable opinion.
- 53% said the Republicans up for recall should be kept in office compared to 35% in favor of recalling them.
- 57% said the Democrats up for recall should be kept in office compared to 33% in favor of recalling them.

=== After the protest period ===
The conservative think tank Manhattan Institute for Policy Research released a poll on September 20. They interviewed 400 registered Wisconsin voters between August 29 and September 5. The margin of error was +/− 4.9% points.

- 49% approved of Governor Walker's job performance, while 50% disapproved.
- 44% favored recalling the Governor, while 50% did not.
- 53% said they favored restricting collective bargaining rights for public sector employees, while 45% opposed.
- 52% opposed the collective bargaining law passed in Wisconsin, while 45% supported the new law.
- 43% said they favored repealing the law completely, 34% wanted to keep the law as is, and 18% wanted the law to be amended in some way.
- 43% believed the new law was helping Wisconsin's financial problems, while 41% believed it was not.
- 55% believed the new law helped eliminate Wisconsin's $3 billion budget deficit, while 41% believed it did not.

On October 26, the Liberal Public Policy Polling organization released a poll focusing on Scott Walker's possible recall. It revealed the following;

- 51% of Wisconsinites disapproved of Governor Walker, while 47% approved.
- 48% supported recalling the Governor, while 49% opposed.
- In a hypothetical recall election, Scott Walker would beat Peter Barca, Tom Barrett, Jon Erpenbach, Kathleen Falk, Steve Kagen, Ron Kind, and David Obey by various margins.
- In a hypothetical recall election, Scott Walker would lose to Russ Feingold by a 46–49 margin. (Russ Feingold has stated previously he probably won't run)

On January 25, 2012, Marquette University Law School released the results of a statewide poll focusing on Governor Walker and his possible recall.

- 51% approved of the way Scott Walker was handling his job as governor, while 46% opposed.
- 74% of respondents support requiring public employees to pay into their own pension accounts and pay a greater share of their health-insurance premiums.
- 48% of respondents support Walker's plan to limit collective bargaining on benefit and non-wage issues, while 47% did not support Walker's plan.
- In a hypothetical recall election, Scott Walker would beat Milwaukee mayor Tom Barrett 50% to 44%.
- In a hypothetical recall election, Scott Walker would beat former Dane County executive Kathleen Falk 49% to 42%.
- In a hypothetical recall election, Scott Walker would beat former Congressman David Obey 49% to 43%.
- In a hypothetical recall election, Scott Walker would beat Wisconsin State Senator Tim Cullen 50% to 40%.

== Effects ==
On February 17, the Madison Metropolitan School District canceled classes until February 23 because of expected staff and student absences. Numerous other districts across the state also closed due to the protests including Milwaukee, La Crosse, Wausau, and others. Two days after the protests began, protests spread to Columbus, Ohio over similar legislation. Similar protests also occurred at the Nevada State Capitol in Carson City on February 21, 2011, and at the Utah State Capitol in Salt Lake City on February 26, 2011.

The Wisconsin Legislature stated they would continue passing non-budget items with no Democratic opposition in the Senate starting on February 22. On Thursday, March 3, Wisconsin Administration Secretary Mike Huebsch claimed that the weeks of demonstrations resulted in $6.5 million in damages and other costs to the Capital. The next day he admitted that he had no basis for the higher figure and that the actual cleanup costs could be as low as $347,500. State architect Jeffrey Plale, a former Democratic state senator who was appointed to his post by Walker, stated that he had not observed any damages from demonstrations.

On March 21, Professor William Cronon of the University of Wisconsin wrote an op-ed opposing the bill. In response, the Wisconsin Republican Party filed a state open records request for access to Cronon's university emails to discover the sources and discussions that went into the article. The Republican Party's request was criticized for purportedly creating a chilling effect. In response, the Republican Party released a statement accusing Cronon of intimidation.

=== Legislative walkout ===
In another form of protest, and as a tactic to prevent passage of the bill, all 14 Democratic members of the Wisconsin State Senate left the state of Wisconsin and traveled to Illinois in order to delay a vote on the bill. With only 19 Republican members, the Senate would not have the 20 Senators required for a quorum in order to vote on the bill, since it is a fiscal bill. On February 20, all 14 Senate Democrats announced they were staying in Illinois indefinitely.

In a possible lure to get the 14 Democratic Senators to return, the Wisconsin legislature reported they would try to pass a bill that would require citizens to have some form of voter identification to vote. Democrats strongly opposed the bill, but because there were no Democratic senators to defend their position, the bill was expected to pass the Senate easily. On February 24, the Republicans in the Senate moved the voter ID provision past the amendable stage but were unable to take a final vote on it because it spends money for free ID's to comply with federal constitutional requirements. As a fiscal provision, the voter ID bill would require the same quorum currently denied over the main budget bill. The State Senate Majority Leader, Scott Fitzgerald, proposed that Democratic staffers should lose access to the copy machines if their representatives were absent without leave for two days or more, forcing staffers to pay for printing themselves. Senators would no longer receive their wages via direct deposit if they were AWOL for two days or more and would have to collect them in person. (Senator Jon Erpenbach was able to circumvent this by granting his staffers power of attorney.) On March 2, Senate Republicans voted to fine members who are AWOL for two days or more $100 per day of absence. On March 3, the Wisconsin Senate Republicans ordered the arrest of the Wisconsin 14 for being "in contempt and disorderly behavior", authorizing the Senate Sergeant-at-Arms to seek help from law enforcement officers and to use force to return the senators to the Capitol. Jim Palmer, the head of the Wisconsin Professional Police Association, described the action as a violation of the Wisconsin state constitution.

Walker also tried other methods to get the Wisconsin 14 to return to the state, saying that if the bill was not passed by February 25, 1,500 state workers would be laid off. That deadline passed without incident. On February 27, he announced a new deadline of March 1. On March 4, Walker issued layoff warning notices to some state employees, and rescinded those notices upon passage of the budget repair bill. In an attempt to compromise with the Democrats who left the state, Walker proposed allowing public workers to continue bargaining over their salaries with no limit as well as allowing collective bargaining to stay in place on mandatory overtime, performance bonuses, hazardous duty pay and classroom size for teachers.

On March 9, the senate removed fiscal applications from the bill, allowing it to be passed without a quorum. On March 12, the "14" returned to Wisconsin, to loud acclaim from protesters and condemnation from the Senate Majority Leader, Scott Fitzgerald. On March 15 Fitzgerald announced that despite returning, none of the Senate Democrats would be allowed to cast official votes on the union legislation.

=== Contract extensions ===
During the numerous delays related to enactment of the budget repair law, several communities were pursuing to extend union contracts although there have been cases of communities electing to wait for the budget repair bill to take effect. In some cases residents staged protests at open meetings in opposition to extending union contracts. Regarding school districts deciding whether or not to extend union contracts, whether they decided to wait for the law to take effect or not, most districts elected to include the same basic concessions on health care and pensions.

The Milwaukee Teachers Education Association said "no deal" to a proposal that would have them make concessions similar to those called for under the budget repair law. The union said that it has already made all the concessions that it will make. The proposed Milwaukee Public Schools (MPS) budget would cut 989 full-time positions through attrition and layoffs. On June 29, the same day the budget repair law became effective, MPS Superintendent Gregory Thornton announced that 519 layoff notices would be issued for next school year, including 354 teachers. Most members pay about $1,000 per year in dues.

Teachers in the Hartland-Lakeside School District agreed to switch health insurance providers to save the district $690,000, but the executive committee of a union that represents the teachers blocked the change.

In Milwaukee County, when it was known that the budget repair law was to take effect on June 29, the county board approved a union contract on June 23 for nurses, which would preserve their say on working conditions as well as union grievance procedures. Meanwhile, negotiations were under way on a new contract for the county's largest union in an effort to beat the state law, although it appeared likely they had run out of time to do so. The Appleton teachers union made a similar last minute contract extension before the deadline.

Recruitment for the union took place for school districts that elected to wait before extending union contracts. Union membership was steady in districts that signed or extended contract agreements with unions before the budget repair legislation passed because dues are taken out automatically.

=== Special assembly elections ===
On May 3, special elections were held for 3 vacant seats in the Wisconsin State Assembly. The 3 seats were formally held by Republicans that were appointed to higher positions by Governor Walker.

- District 60 – former representative Mark Gottlieb's seat until he was appointed Secretary of Transportation. The district covers parts of Ozaukee and Washington County. Republican Duey Stroebel ran against Democrat Rick Aaron.
- District 83 – former representative Scott Gunderson's seat until he was appointed to a top post at the Wisconsin Department of Natural Resources. The district includes parts of Racine County, Walworth County, and Waukesha County. Republican Dave Craig, an aide to US representative Paul Ryan, ran against Democrat James Brownlow, a retired librarian.
- District 94 – former representative Mike Huebsch's seat until he was appointed to Secretary of the Wisconsin Department of Administration. The district covers parts of rural La Crosse County and parts of Monroe County. Republican John Lautz, a self-employed building contractor, ran against Democrat Steve Doyle, who is a La Crosse County Board chairman.

Results

- District 60 – Republican Duey Stroebel won with 76% of the vote.
- District 83 – Republican Dave Craig won with 74% of the vote.
- District 94 – Democrat Steve Doyle won with 54% of the vote.
- New Assembly Membership: 59 Republicans, 38 Democrats, 1 Independent, 1 Vacant

=== Recall elections ===
According to the advocacy group Wisconsin Democracy Campaign, the recall elections from 2011 and 2012 generated spending between $125 million and $130 million. Approximately $44 million was spent on the 2011 senatorial recall elections, and over $80 million was spent on the gubernatorial and senatorial campaigns in 2012. This compares to the $37.4 million spent on the 2010 Wisconsin gubernatorial campaign. Over $20 million of taxpayer funds were spent on the fifteen recall elections, costs incurred by the state elections board due to petition verification, and oversight of the elections. The primary and general election for the statewide recalls in 2012 cost taxpayers about $18 million, while the 2011 senate recalls cost taxpayers $2.1 million.

==== 2011 senatorial recall elections ====
There were efforts to recall eight Democrats and eight Republicans related to the budget repair bill. The Democrats were targeted for leaving the state for three weeks to prevent the budget repair bill vote from taking place while the Republicans were targeted for voting to seriously limit public employee collective bargaining. Scholars could cite only three times in U.S. history when more than one state legislator was subject to a recall election at roughly the same time over the same issue.

Six Republicans and three Democrats faced recall elections in August 2011. Efforts to recall Glenn Grothman (R-20th District), Mary Lazich (R-28th District), Lena Taylor (D-4th District), Spencer Coggs (D-6th District), Fred Risser (D-Madison), Julie Lassa (D-Stevens Point) and Mark Miller (D-Monona) were unsuccessful.

The Wisconsin Government Accountability Board voted in favor of all recall elections, but scheduled the Democratic recall elections one week after (August 16, 2011) the Republican recall elections.

On August 9, the Republicans won enough seats to keep control of the Wisconsin Senate, despite losing Randy Hopper's and Dan Kapanke's seats, bringing the largest group of simultaneous recall elections in United States history to a close. The results were regarded as a disappointment for Democrats and labor unions.

Republican senators

District	Senator	Hometown	Recall filed	Primary, general elections	Primary candidates	Winner of primary	Winner of general
2	Robert Cowles	Green Bay	April 28	July 12, August 9	Nancy Nusbaum (D-De Pere), Otto Junkermann (Green Bay)	Nancy Nusbaum with 65%	Robert Cowles with 57%^{1}
8	Alberta Darling	River Hills	April 21	July 12, August 9	Rep. Sandy Pasch (D-Whitefish Bay), Gladys Huber (Mequon)	Sandy Pasch with 65%	Alberta Darling with 54%
10	Sheila Harsdorf	River Falls	April 19	July 12, August 9	Shelly Moore (D-River Falls), Isaac Weix (Menomonie)	Shelly Moore with 55%	Sheila Harsdorf with 58%
14	Luther Olsen	Ripon	April 18	July 12, August 9	Rep. Fred Clark (D-Baraboo), Rol Church (Wautoma)	Fred Clark with 67%	Luther Olsen with 52%
18	Randy Hopper	Fond du Lac	April 7	July 12, August 9	Jessica King (D-Oshkosh), John Buckstaff (Oshkosh)	Jessica King with 69%	Jessica King with 51%
32	Dan Kapanke	La Crosse	April 1	July 12, August 9	Rep. Jennifer Shilling (D-La Crosse), James D. Smith (La Crosse)	Jennifer Shilling with 70%	Jennifer Shilling with 55%

1. Canvassing after the election revealed Nancy Nusbaum was credited with zero votes from Kaukauna due to human error. This decreased Cowles lead from 60% to 57%, but did not change the outcome of the election.

Democratic senators

District	Senator	Hometown	Recall filed	Primary, general elections	Primary candidates	Winner of primary	Winner of general
12	Jim Holperin	Conover	April 21	July 19, August 16	Kim Simac of Eagle River, Robert Lussow of Tomahawk	Kim Simac with 59%	Jim Holperin with 55%
22	Robert Wirch	Pleasant Prairie	April 21	July 19, August 16	Fred Ekornaas of Bristol, Jonathan Steitz of Pleasant Prairie	Jonathan Steitz with 64%	Robert Wirch with 57%
30	Dave Hansen	Green Bay	April 21	July 19^{1}	David VanderLeest of Green Bay	N/A	Dave Hansen with 67%

1. On June 27, John Nygren was taken off the ballot in the Dave Hansen recall election because he did not collect 400 valid signatures. The recall election between VanderLeest and Hansen occurred on July 19. Hansen easily won re-election.

==== 2012 gubernatorial and senatorial recall elections ====
Governor Walker

On November 15, the recall petitions against Scott Walker and Rebecca Kleefisch began to circulate. Supporters of the recall had to collect 540,206 valid signatures by January 14.

On January 17, over 1 million signatures to recall Governor Walker were submitted to the state GAB on over 100,000 recall petitions. On March 30, 2012, the Wisconsin Government Accountability Board certified recall elections for Scott Walker and Rebecca Kleefisch.

Democratic Primary

Tom Barrett won the Democratic primary on May 8, and went up against Walker on June 5.

Democratic primary results
Party	Candidate	Votes	%
Democratic	Tom Barrett	390,109	58.2
Democratic	Kathleen Falk	228,940	34.2
Democratic	Kathleen Vinehout	26,926	4.0
Democratic	Douglas La Follette	19,461	2.9
Democratic	Gladys Huber	4,842	0.7
Total votes		670,278	100.0

Republican Primary

Walker received over 625,000 votes, the most votes for a candidate in a Wisconsin gubernatorial primary since 1952.

Republican primary results
Party	Candidate	Votes	%
Republican	Scott Walker	626,538	96.9
Republican	Arthur Kohl-Riggs	19,920	3.1
Total votes		646,458	100.0

General election

Wisconsin gubernatorial recall election, 2012 results
Party	Candidate	Votes	%
Republican	Scott Walker (Incumbent)	1,335,585	53.1
Democratic	Tom Barrett	1,164,480	46.3
Independent	Hari Trivedi	14,463	0.6
Total votes		2,514,528	100.0

State senators

On March 12, the Wisconsin Government Accountability Board confirmed enough signatures had been submitted to recall each of the four Republican state senators. Republicans Scott Fitzgerald and Terry Moulton won their respective recalls. Republican Jerry Petrowski won the open seat vacated by Pam Galloway. Republican Van Wanggaard was defeated by Democrat John Lehman, whom Wanggaard had defeated in 2010. This shifted the power of the Wisconsin Senate briefly to the Democrats, but the Senate Republicans regained a majority (albeit slightly reduced from before) in 2013, after one Democratic State Senator retired and two others lost their own election races in 2013.

Republican senators

District	Senator	Hometown	Recall filed	Primary, general elections	Current opponents	Winner of primary	Winner of general
13	Scott Fitzgerald	Juneau	January 17	May 8, June 5	Recall organizer Lori Compas, Gary Ellerman (Fake Dem)	Lori Compas with 72%	Scott Fitzgerald with 58%
21	Van Wanggaard	Racine	January 17	May 8, June 5	Former State Senator John Lehman, Tamara Varebrook (Fake Dem)	John Lehman with 68%	John Lehman with 51%
23	Terry Moulton	Chippewa Falls	January 17	May 8, June 5	Former Wisconsin State Rep. Kristen Dexter, James Engel (Fake Dem)	Kristen Dexter with 64%	Terry Moulton with 57%
29	Vacant^{1}		January 17	May 8, June 5	Wisconsin State Rep. Donna Seidel (Dem), James Buckley (Fake Dem), Wisconsin State Rep. Jerry Petrowski (Rep)	Donna Seidel with 64% and Jerry Petrowski^{2}	Jerry Petrowski with 61%

1. On March 16, 2012, Pam Galloway announced she was resigning from her Senate seat because of illness in her family. A recall election is still planned.
2. Jerry Petrowski was uncontested in the Republican primary.

=== Outcomes since law became effective ===
==== District savings ====
In Kaukauna, school officials put in place new policies they estimate will turn a $400,000 deficit into a $1.5 million surplus. In April 2011, the union had offered healthcare and pension concessions as well as a wage freeze, which it projected would save $1.8 million, but the offer was rejected by the school board. "The monetary part of it is not the entire issue," said board President Todd Arnoldussen. "It was in the collective bargaining agreement that we could only negotiate with them," said Arnoldussen referring to the past, when Kaukauna's agreement with the teachers union required the school district to purchase health insurance coverage from WEA Trust – a company created by the Wisconsin teachers union. This year, the trust told Kaukauna that it would face a significant increase in premiums. With the collective bargaining agreement gone, the school district is free to shop around for coverage. Kaukauna can reduce the size of its classes – from 31 students to 26 students in high school and from 26 students to 23 students in elementary school. In addition, there will be more teacher time for one-on-one sessions with troubled students. Those changes would not have been possible without the changes in collective bargaining. The money saved will be used to hire a few more teachers and institute merit pay.

The city of Milwaukee projects it will save at least $25 million a year and possibly as much as $36 million in 2012 from health care benefit changes due to not having to negotiate with unions. This is offset by about $14 million in cuts in state aid. This contrasts with Mayor Tom Barrett's initial comments in March, after the Walker administration and the nonpartisan Legislative Fiscal Bureau released figures on the extent of the aid cuts in the state budget.

Racine County estimates it will save over $1.5 million in employee pension contributions that resulted from recent state collective bargaining changes. In addition, county employees will be more limited on how much comp time they can accrue, will need to pay more for name-brand prescription drugs and will not be able to receive overtime unless they work more than 40 hours. Racine County Executive Jim Ladwig, who proposed the changes, estimated the changes will save the county several hundred thousand dollars per year.

Other examples of district savings include Oshkosh school board, which will save over $3.7 million over the next three years. Menomonee Falls school board will save $2.4 million by changing health providers, Hudson school district will save over $1 million by changing health providers, Shorewood school district will save $537,000 by changing health providers, Ashland school district will save $378,000 by changing health providers, and Wauwatosa school board which would have faced a choice of laying off more than 100 teachers and other employees, yet were able to prevent that outcome by implementing pay freezes and employees accepting higher pension payments and higher deductible health care plans as well as the property tax levy projected to decrease.

==== Tax levy reductions ====
Tax levy figures for the 2011–12 school year show the total tax levy is down more than $47 million for K-12 schools. This amounts to a 1% decrease on the school tax portion of the average property tax bill. Since 1996, it is only the second time the total school tax levy has dropped. Over the last five years the tax levy, on average, increased by $181 million each year. In total, 269 school districts have a property tax levy lower or the same as last year and 200 school districts not only lowered their levy, but cut their mill rate.

==== Reductions in state aid ====
The budget repair law reduced state aid to K–12 school districts by about $900 million over the next two years. 410 of Wisconsin's 424 districts will get about 10 percent less aid than the previous year. The biggest losses in dollar amounts will occur in the Milwaukee, Racine and Green Bay districts; Milwaukee will lose $54.6 million, Racine $13.1 million and Green Bay $8.8 million. State aid to schools is computed by a complex formula based on property values, student enrollment and other factors. Property-poor districts get more aid than property-rich districts because they have lower property taxes.

A provision in the budget repair law restricts the options of what districts can collect in property taxes and other revenue by requiring a referendum to prevent them from trying to replace their losses in state aid without first going to the citizens of the district. In Milwaukee, district officials announced they have eliminated 514 vacant positions and laid off almost 520 employees, including 354 teachers, mostly from elementary schools, which will result in larger class sizes. The Milwaukee School Board asked its teachers union for a side agreement requiring teachers to contribute 5.8% of their pay toward pensions, as the teachers union contract extends through 2013.

The pension contribution would have saved about $20 million and 200 jobs, however the union rejected the concession. The Racine district has saved about $18 million from a wage freeze and larger employee contributions to pensions and health care, but the loss of state aid still required the elimination of 125 positions (although a larger than usual number of retirements and resignations and soon-to-be eliminated positions that are already vacant means the district will actual need to lay off only 60 employees) and the closing of all but one swimming pool for the summer. The Green Bay district also froze wages and required greater employee contributions to pensions and health care, but the district has stopped filling vacancies and may have to combine elementary grades into single classrooms.

Nearly 70% of state school districts will be eligible for special adjustment aid, largely because of the decrease in the state's share of support. The special adjustment aid is intended to provide school districts with 90% of the state general aid from the previous year.

==== Effect on public sector unions ====
Union dues changes

Since teachers' unions are no longer able to automatically deduct dues from teachers' paychecks because of the new budget repair law, unions are using a variety of methods including using a combination of meetings, emails, phone calls and home visits to get teachers signed up for dues collection. Some school districts are primarily signing members up for electronic funds transfers so they can deduct money monthly. The latest IRS filing available shows that WEAC collected about $23.5 million in membership dues in fiscal year 2009 from its approximately 98,000 members. Most of the membership dues go to pay salaries and benefits. The organization employed 151 people and paid them $14,382,812, which is an average compensation total of $95,250 per employee. This figure includes not only professional staff but also lost wages paid to union bargaining team members, officers, and delegates to conventions.

Union layoffs

The Wisconsin Education Association Council (WEAC), announced they would lay off about 40% of its workforce. The layoffs and budget cuts are based on a projected loss of revenue as a result of the budget repair legislation.

Union decertifications

For the affected unions, Act 10 prohibited collective bargaining agreements from covering any topic other than base wages, with any raises prohibited from exceeding the cost of inflation. Furthermore, it required the unions to hold an election every year where 51% of all employees (not simply 51% of those choosing to vote) had to vote Yes in order to continue collective bargaining in the coming year. Given these constraints, a number of unions declined to participate in the annual election, and thus were "decertified"—no longer recognized as a collective bargaining agent by the state of Wisconsin.

The UW–Madison teaching assistant union, which was at the forefront of the protests against the new budget repair law, declined to recertify their union in August 2011. Union leaders for state and local government workers said they also were leaning toward not recertifying.

On August 29, 2011, the Wisconsin Education Association Council (WEAC) announced it would allow local union affiliates to possibly drop certification and that the group would accept whatever the local unions chose.

On September 21, the 23,000-member Wisconsin State Employees Union announced it would not recertify. The state employee unions represented by the American Federation of Teachers-Wisconsin also mostly declined to recertify, with only a small local, the Professional Employees in Research, Statistics and Analysis, representing 58 employees, announcing a recertification vote among its members. Only 4 small unions are expected to recertify on the deadline for re-certification, 4:30 pm on September 22. They represent building trades workers, prosecutors, attorneys, and state research employees. Any union that has not filed re-certification by this time will lose official certification within the state. Some school and local government employees have outstanding contracts and won't have to vote to recertify until these current contracts run out. Unions for teachers and other school district employees without contracts have until Sep 30 to file for a recertification election. Municipal employees without contracts have until Jan. 30. Besides the state unions, 13 other local government and school district unions so far have also filed with the state seeking a recertification election.

In December 2011, many local teachers unions (177 of 206) voted to re-certify. A majority of those teachers unions that held elections voted to re-certify and a majority of those that failed to re-certify did so due to rules in the new law treating a non-vote the same as a vote against recertification. For example, in one election the teachers' union was de-certified when the vote to re-certify was 31 in favor of recertification and 1 against. However, since the union was listed as having 64 members, the union was decertified because a majority of total members (33) is required to re-certify, not a majority of votes cast.

==== Requests for union contract concessions ====
Milwaukee Mayor Tom Barrett asked city firefighters and police officers to voluntarily accept the pension and health care concessions that the state budget-repair bill required on most other public employee unions. Without such concessions, city officials would be forced to cut deeply into other services to make up for the cuts in state aid included in Gov. Scott Walker's 2011–'13 state budget. Walker's budget-repair bill would require most state and local government and school district employees to pay at least 5.8% of their pension costs and 12.6% of their health care premiums, while eliminating most collective bargaining, except for wages, within strict limits. But none of those changes would apply to police officers, firefighters, sheriff's deputies or state troopers. The firefighters union have been without a contract for about 14 months, and negotiations have been in mediation since the fall of 2011. The police union is open to considering the mayor's request.

Leaders of the Milwaukee teachers union, Milwaukee Public Schools administration and School Board asked the state Legislature to create a window of time for the district to negotiate compensation or fringe-benefit concessions without nullifying existing union contracts. Milwaukee Public Schools must contribute nearly $10 million more to the city's pension plan because of financial market downturns. That pension is for nonclassified district employees such as educational assistants and engineers, but fulfilling the obligation means even more money could be taken from the classroom in a time of already reduced finances. The school board in December 2011, decided to increase employee contributions to their health care and pension plans, but those won't initiate until contracts expire in the summer of 2012 for many district employees. The teachers' contract expires in the summer of 2013. The existing contract includes a 3% salary raise, and School Board President Michael Bonds considered asking the union if it would forgo that raise. Instead, he said, they decided to try to ask the state Legislature for permission to reopen the whole contract to look at various elements without penalty. The Assembly and Senate agreed to allow Milwaukee schools to reopen negotiations for compensation or fringe-benefit concessions without nullifying existing union contracts. The measure giving them 90 days passed the Assembly and Senate. Gov. Scott Walker supports the measure. Other teachers unions asked Milwaukee to withdraw its request, saying it would give Walker a political advantage in the recall election.

==== Teacher sick-out and school closures ====
In 2018, after experiencing reductions in compensation and benefits 40% of Wisconsin teachers called in sick as part of protests planned at the capitol while school was in session. This resulted in multiple school closures.

==== Legal challenges ====
2011

After the collective bargaining bill was signed into law, Dane County Judge Maryann Sumi struck it down, ruling that it was passed in violation of the Open Meetings Law. The Wisconsin Supreme Court overturned Sumi's ruling on June 14.

In July 2011, workers from two local chapters of the AFL–CIO filed a lawsuit against the law, alleging it violates the US Constitution's equal protection clause by limiting collective bargaining only for public workers. Another lawsuit was filed by opponents of the Budget Repair Bill, raising claims that public workers could lose their jobs to Wisconsin prisoners by officials who will now have greater leeway to assign those jobs previously reserved for unionized employees.

On December 30, 2011, Dane County district attorney Ismael Ozanne asked the state Supreme Court to reopen the collective bargaining case because he said Justice Michael Gableman was wrong to participate in the matter due to possible ethics violations.

2012

On March 30, 2012, a federal court struck down key parts of the collective bargaining legislation, ruling that the state cannot prevent public employee unions from collecting dues and cannot require they recertify annually. On September 24, 2012 the State of Wisconsin appealed that decision at the U.S. Court of Appeals for the Seventh Circuit.

On September 14, 2012, Dane County circuit Judge Juan Colas decided to overturn the law restricting collective bargaining rights for public employees, ruling that the law violates state and federal constitutions.

2013

In January 2013, the U.S. Court of Appeals for the Seventh District upheld the Wisconsin collective bargaining law.

In September 2013, U.S. District Judge William Conley threw out the lawsuit from two public sector unions for "contending the law violates their rights to freedom of association and equal protection under the law." First Amendment does not require an affirmative response from governmental entities; it simply requires the absence of a negative restriction," Conley wrote. "Under Act 10, general employees remain free to associate and represent employees and their unions remain free to speak; municipal employers are simply not allowed to listen."

=== Tensions since the protest period ===
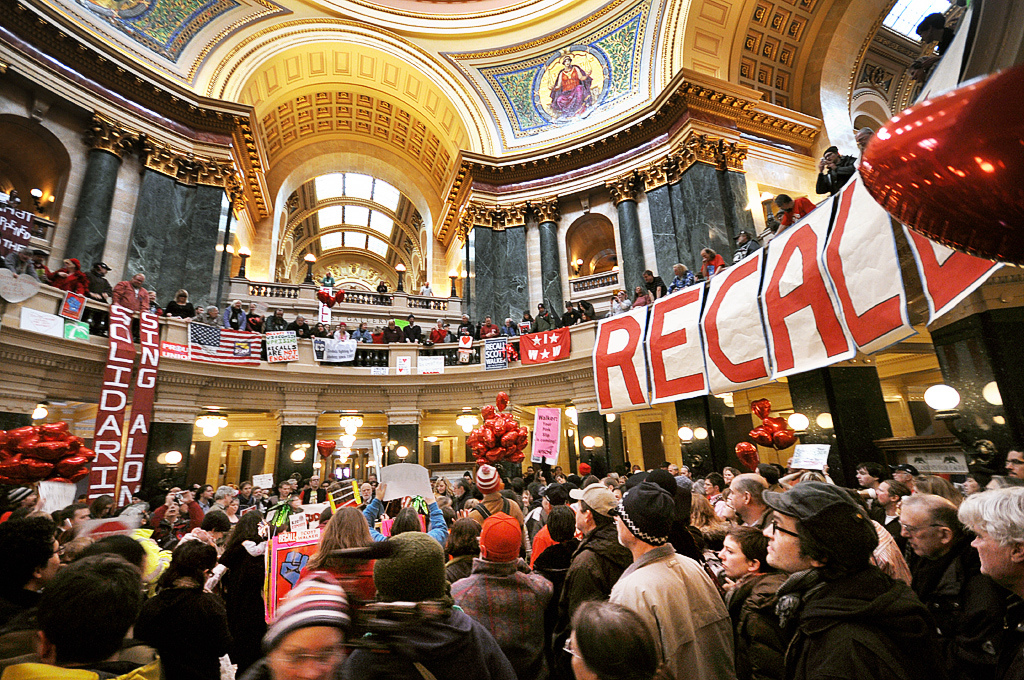
Protests in the Capitol, February 14, 2012

- Union officials in central Wisconsin voted to ban Republican politicians from the Labor Day parade held in Wausau, Wisconsin. In a statement from the union council website, council president Randy Radtke said that politicians are welcome at the festivities only if they have demonstrated support for workers' rights. Mayor Jim Tipple of Wausau responded that the city would not help with the cost of the parade unless a decision to ban Republican politicians was reversed. The union later reversed its decision to exclude Republican politicians.
- In September 2011, Republican State Senator and Joint Finance Committee Chair Alberta Darling said Democratic State Senator Lena Taylor should be removed from the Joint Finance Committee. A heated exchange transpired between the two senators during the committee meeting. Darling attempted to twice interject while Taylor was speaking. The committee went informal twice after the senators argued back and forth. It started when Senator Taylor was speaking about the need to pay for the officers who helped control protesters in February and March. Senator Darling walked out of the meeting for a moment. When she returned, the two continued the heated exchange. Senator Darling responded to the incident by saying, "She doesn't feel like she has to respect the voice and the opinions of the chair. She can call people liars. This level of disrespect for the process, disrespect for rules of law and disrespect for the process of doing legislations for the people of Wisconsin is a concern."
- In February 2012, Charles Koch, who was accused of aiding Governor Walker in his disputes against public employee unions, revealed that he received threatening e-mails of which many contained obscenities. Some Koch employees said these messages had made them nervous.
- In 2012, Governor Walker took issue with the teachers' union WEAC not releasing its annual surveys measuring layoffs and school conditions. There was a survey of superintendents by the Department of Public Instruction and the Wisconsin Association of School District Administrators (WASDA) in the fall of 2011 which the governor used to compare the performance of his reforms to the previous administration. The WASDA survey results compare favorable to those that have been released by WEAC from prior years. Governor Walker indicates that it is evidence that the efforts associated with the implemented reforms under Act 10 are successful. WEAC responded that drawing attention to this was political in nature. Walker posted WEAC's previous surveys on the governor's website and compared previous survey results to current trends which shows improvements in the following four areas: teacher layoffs, class size, student fees, and extracurricular programs. The data compares 2011–2012 (Act 10) to the school years 2002–2003 through 2008–2009. Walker requested that the survey results be made available and asked why previous surveys had been removed from their website.

== Responses ==
=== Political ===
- U.S. President Barack Obama, said that Walker's proposal "seems more like an assault on unions".
- Wisconsin U.S. Senator Herb Kohl opposes limiting state workers' bargaining rights, but said they should contribute more to their benefits and pension policies. He supported the Democratic State Senators who left the state.
- Wisconsin U.S. Senator Ron Johnson said the budget repair bill "is not about individual workers...but about rebalancing the equation so that the taxpayers' interests are being protected." He said that the "amount of thuggery, the threats of execution" have not been sufficiently covered by the media.
- Former Republican U.S. House Speaker Newt Gingrich called the debate a "profound struggle between the right of the people to govern themselves and the power of entrenched, selfish interests to stop reforms and defy the will of the people."
- Republican U.S. House Speaker John Boehner compared the Wisconsin protests to the 2010-2011 Greek protests, and accused Obama's administration of helping coordinate union groups to rally in larger numbers in Madison.
- The protests have been compared to the 2011 Egyptian revolution by both Democratic Representatives such as John Lewis, and Republican Representatives, such as Paul Ryan. Mike Lux, a political consultant, stated that "the pictures we are seeing and the story playing out in Wisconsin is like Egypt in some really important ways. The new mass militancy of union members, students, and other allies of the maligned teachers, social workers, cops, firefighters, and other public employees being attacked and threatened by the governor is not a manufactured thing, it is a mass movement spreading like wildfire, building in momentum day by day."
- Arne Carlson, a former Republican governor of neighboring Minnesota, criticized Walker for a bill provision allowing for the no-bid sale of state-owned energy facilities, and for his actions regarding the fake call.

=== National news ===
- An NBC News article by John Bailey listed as one of five factors responsible for the budget shortfall a series of tax cuts beginning in 2003 by the Wisconsin Legislature, claiming they would cause an "$800 million-per-year reduction in tax revenues" in 2013.
- National Review reported that opponents of Act 10 used some controversial methods.

=== Religious figures ===
- Milwaukee Catholic Archbishop Jerome Listecki sent a statement to the Joint Finance Committee asking for respect for the legitimate rights of workers and specifically referenced Pope Benedict XVI's encyclical Caritas in veritate and Pope John Paul II's encyclical Laborem exercens. The archbishop, however, went on to add that not every claim made by workers or their representatives is valid and that every union is called to work for the common good, to make sacrifices when required, and to adjust to new economic realities.
- United Methodist Church Bishop of Wisconsin Linda Lee has voiced her concern by referencing the 2008 Book of Discipline, which supports the right of all public and private employees and employers to organize for collective bargaining. She requested that the governor reconsider his initiative in this matter.
- Rabbi Jonathan Biatch of Madison's Temple Beth El spoke out against Governor Walker's bill and was one of eight rabbis of Madison's liberal Jewish movements to sign a letter supporting the Jewish mandate to protect workers, as well as the poor and needy, deep value for education, for supporting women's rights, and for creating sustainable communities, and their belief that these issues should be debated openly and fairly under public scrutiny.

=== Unions ===
- Solidarity was the watchword throughout the 2011 protests, beginning very soon after Governor Walker proposed his collective bargaining changes on February 11. Public and private unions alike, including the largest police and fire unions whose members were exempt under the Governor's bill, met on February 14 to declare their opposition to the Governor's "union-busting measures."
- An ad created by advisers to the national AFL–CIO, SEIU and AFSCME unions and paid for by the Wisconsin AFL–CIO was launched. The ad featured "Racine firefighter Mike DeGarmo proclaiming solidarity between firefighters (who, like police officers, are exempt from Walker's proposal) and other public employees. ... A spokesman for the national AFL–CIO, Eddie Vale, says [the ad]'s supported by a 'significant statewide buy'".
- Stu Betts, the former president of the West De Pere Educational Association (WDPEA), sent a letter to the union membership indicating that he resigned under pressure from the WDPEA executive committee. He claims that the Wisconsin Education Association Council (WEAC) is about making sure union dues are mandatory, not about teachers' rights. He did not endorse the demonstrations at the capital but did state he wrote letters to the governor expressing concerns regarding the proposed legislation.
- Harold A. Schaitberger, the president of the International Association of Firefighters, said that they will quit donating to federal candidates this year because members of Congress are not doing enough to support organized labor. He says there is a more urgent need to spend money defending anti-union measures sweeping GOP-controlled statehouses across the country and that members of Congress should be doing more to speak out against efforts in states to take away collective bargaining rights and weaken union clout. The union is among the most influential and biggest-spending lobbying groups on Capitol Hill.
- (Poland) Piotr Duda, president of the Polish trade union Solidarity, released a statement on behalf of the 700,000-strong union in support of the Wisconsin protesters.
- (Spain) The Spanish union confederation CNT released a statement supporting the "workers who have taken a stand against aggressions to their rights as laborers and especially to their right to organize."

=== Academia ===
- Linguist and social activist Noam Chomsky (a self-described libertarian socialist) said that the Wisconsin protests and the 2011 Egyptian revolution "are closely intertwined", and that both consist of "struggles for labor rights and democracy".

=== Think tanks ===
- The Heritage Foundation's policy analyst James Sherk wrote in support of Governor Walker's budget plan, "Gov. Walker's plan reasserts voter control over government policy. Voters' elected representatives should decide how the government spends their taxes. More states should heed the AFL–CIO Executive Council's 1959 advice: 'in terms of accepted collective bargaining procedures, government workers have no right beyond the authority to petition Congress—a right available to every citizen.'"
- Wisconsin Policy Research Institute released a study that shows that state public employees on average receive hundreds of dollars more per month in retirement than higher-paid employees in the private sector. According to the report, an employee covered by the Wisconsin Retirement System who earns $48,000 a year would retire with an estimated monthly benefit of $1,712 from the system ($20,544 a year). In contrast, a private sector employee who earned $70,000 a year would get an estimated $1,301 a month in retirement ($15,612 a year) which is $411 less per month ($4932 a year) than the lower-paid public sector retiree.
- Americans for Prosperity president Tim Phillips went to Madison to "voice praise for cutting state spending by slashing union benefits and bargaining rights [and to address] a large group of counterprotesters." Phillips also said: "We are going to bring fiscal sanity back to this great nation. ... This is a watershed moment in Wisconsin. ... For the last two decades, government unions have used their power to drive pensions and benefits and salaries well beyond anything that can be sustained. We are just trying to change that." The group planned an ad campaign in support of Gov. Walker's initiatives.
- Citizens for Responsibility and Ethics in Washington claimed Gov. Walker violated Wisconsin law by unlawfully sending state troopers in search of a missing legislator, as well as possibly conspiring with the State Patrol superintendent (the father of Scott Fitzgerald, the Republican Senate Majority Leader, who was appointed by Walker) in order to do so.

Their sentiments have been echoed by other nonpartisan watchdog groups, both local (such as Wisconsin Common Cause) and national (such as the Public Campaign Action Fund), who have requested that state authorities review Walker's conduct in the fake call to determine whether he had violated ethics/campaign laws.

=== Entertainment media ===
- On February 21, a major draw for the protesters was Tom Morello, guitarist of rock group Rage Against the Machine, who said his mother was a union public school teacher in Illinois. Morello also said "[f]riends and unions in Brazil and in Korea—the whole world is watching"; and that he had "even heard from a principal organizer of the protests in Cairo about what's happening in Madison."
- Peter Yarrow, from Peter, Paul and Mary, attended and said he was honored to be a part of the protests.
- Filmmaker Michael Moore was in attendance on March 5, where he addressed the protesters from the Capitol, criticizing the Wisconsin Legislature and leadership. He said: "Right now the Earth is shaking and the ground is shifting under the feet of those who are in charge. America is not broke.... Wisconsin is not broke. The only thing that's broke is the moral compass of the rulers."
- John Darnielle ("The Mountain Goats") showed his support by posting pro-union tweets and publishing a video cover of Joe Hill's "There is Power in the Union".
- On February 26, actor Bradley Whitford, a native of Madison, spoke to the protesters in Madison in support of the unions, declaring, "He [Walker] needs to know this will not stand."
- On March 12, actors Susan Sarandon and Tony Shalhoub (a Green Bay native) spoke to the protesters in Madison, and pledged their support of the unions.
- On Labor Day 2014, Massachusetts-based band Eddie Japan released the video for their new song, "Fight Song", on the website of the Wisconsin AFL–CIO; the video dedicates the song to the 2011 Wisconsin protestors.

=== Other ===
The New York Times conservative columnist David Brooks wrote that "[i]t's the Democratic minority that is thwarting the majority will by fleeing to Illinois". Brooks opined that private sector unions push against the interests of shareholders and management while "public sector unions push against the interests of taxpayers". He also wrote that private sector union members "know that their employers could go out of business, so they have an incentive to mitigate their demands; public sector union members work for state monopolies and have no such interest."

The protests and the recall were the subject of the 2013 documentary Citizen Koch.

== Related news ==
Indiana Deputy Attorney General Jeffrey Cox was fired after suggesting that Wisconsin Governor Scott Walker use live ammunition against pro-union protesters involved in the 2011 Wisconsin protests. Later, a Deputy Prosecutor in Johnson County, Indiana, Carlos Lam, suggested that Governor Walker should mount a "false flag" operation that would make it appear as if the union was committing violence. After initially claiming that his email account was hacked, Lam admitted to making the suggestion and resigned. Cullen Werwie, press secretary for Governor Walker, stated that Walker's office was unaware of Lam's email.

CBS News reported that Werwie commented, "Certainly we do not support the actions suggested in (the) email. Governor Walker has said time and again that the protesters have every right to have their voice heard, and for the most part the protests have been peaceful. We are hopeful that the tradition will continue."

The Mackinac Center for Public Policy, a conservative research group in Michigan, issued a public records request to the labor studies departments at three public universities in the state, seeking any e-mails involving the Wisconsin labor protests. The request asked the three universities' labor studies faculty members for any e-mails mentioning "Scott Walker", "Madison", "Wisconsin" or "Rachel Maddow". Greg Scholtz, the director of academic freedom for the American Association of University Professors, said: "We think all this will have a chilling effect on academic freedom. We've never seen Freedom of Information Act requests used like this before."

== See also ==
- 2010–2011 Greek protests
- 2011 anti-cuts protest in London
- 2011 Rome demonstration
- Occupy Wall Street
- Ohio Senate Bill 5 Voter Referendum, Issue 2 (2011)
- Overpass Light Brigade
- Use of social media in the Wisconsin protests

== Books ==
- Uprising: How Wisconsin Renewed the Politics of Protest, from Madison to Wall Street. By John Nichols. New York: Nation Books, c2012. ISBN 9781568587035
- We Are Wisconsin: The Wisconsin Uprising in the Words of the Activists, Writers, and Everyday Wisconsinites Who Made It Happen. Edited by Erica Sagrans. Minneapolis: Tasora Books, c2011. ISBN 9781934690482
- Wisconsin Uprising: Labor Fights Back. Edited by Michael D. Yates. New York: Monthly Review Press, c2012. ISBN 9781583672808
- It Started in Wisconsin. Edited by Mari Jo Buhle and Paul Buhle. New York: Verso, 2011. ISBN 9781844678884
- Cut from Plain Cloth: The 2011 Wisconsin Workers Protests. By Dennis Weidemann. Fitchburg, Wis.: Berens House, c2012. ISBN 9780979685217
- Inside, At Night: Origins of an Uprising. By Brent Nicastro, et al. Madison: Tamarack Studio & Gallery, 2012. ISBN 9780000102249
- The Lessons of Wisconsin: The Way Forward in the Fight Against Austerity. Edited by the Socialist Equality Party. Oak Park, MI: Socialist Equality Party, 2012.
- The Battle of Wisconsin: History and Lessons from the Working-Class Revolt of 2011. By George Martin Fell Brown. New York: Socialist Alternative, 2012.
- More than They Bargained for: Scott Walker, Unions, and the Fight for Wisconsin. By Jason Stein and Patrick Marley. Madison: The University of Wisconsin Press, 2013. ISBN 9780299293840
- A View from the Interior: Policing the Protests at the Wisconsin State Capitol. By Susan Riseling. Milwaukee: HenschelHAUS Publishing, 2013. ISBN 9781595982551
- Unintimidated: Wisconsin Sings Truth to Power. Edited by Nicole Desautels, et al. La Pointe, Wisconsin: Mad Island Communications, c2013. ISBN 9780991010905
- Signs of Protest, Madison, Wisconsin – 2011–2012. Madison, Wisconsin: The Center for Photography at Madison, c2012. ISBN 9781467546874
