= Wisconsin Department of Transportation =

Government agency in Wisconsin, United States

Wisconsin Department of Transportation (WisDOT)

Agency overview
- Formed: 1967
- Preceding agencies: Wisconsin Highway Commission; Wisconsin Aeronautics Commission; Wisconsin State Patrol
- Jurisdiction: Wisconsin
- Headquarters: 4822 Madison Yards Way, Madison, Wisconsin 53707-7910
- Agency executives: Kristina Boardman, Secretary of Transportation; Scott Lawry, Deputy Secretary of Transportation; David Hubbard, Assistant Deputy Secretary of Transportation
- Parent agency: State of Wisconsin
- Website: wisconsindot.gov

The Wisconsin Department of Transportation (WisDOT) is a governmental agency of the U.S. state of Wisconsin responsible for planning, building and maintaining the state's highways. It is also responsible for planning transportation in the state relating to rail, including passenger rail, public transit, freight water transport and air transport, including partial funding of the Milwaukee-to-Chicago Hiawatha provided by Amtrak.

The Wisconsin DOT is made up of three executive offices and five divisions organized according to transportation function. WisDOT's main office is located at Hill Farms State Transportation Building in Madison, and it maintains regional offices throughout the state.

Wisconsin Highways

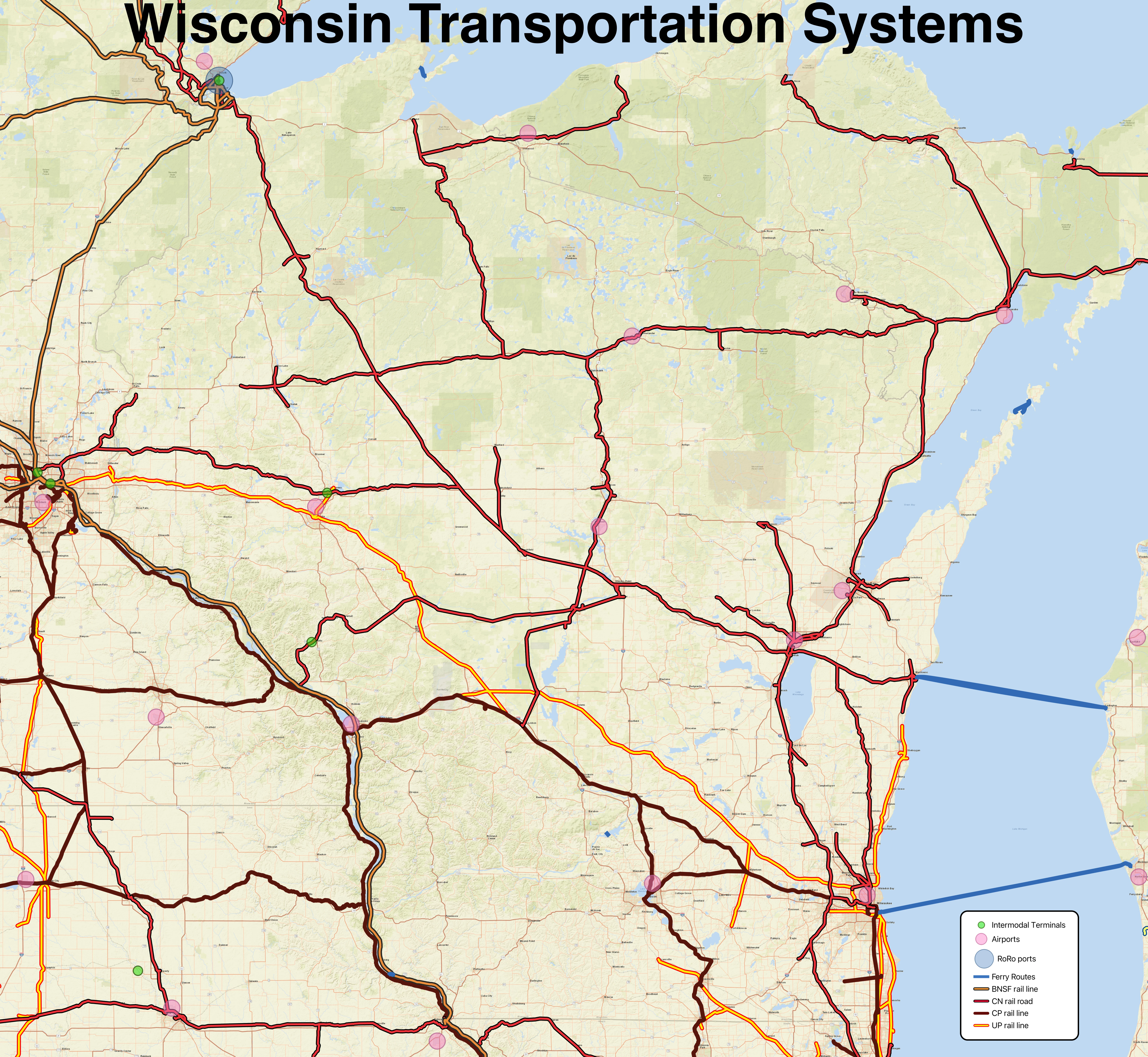
Wisconsin class 1 railroads

== History ==
In 1905, the state legislature introduced an amendment to the state constitution that would allow the state to fund construction and improvement of roads. It was approved by voters in 1908. On June 14, 1911 governor Francis McGovern signed legislation that created the State Highway Commission. Its members met for the first time three days later. The commission originally consisted of five part-time members and nine permanent employees. Its duties included reviewing proposed highway projects and regulating the construction and inspection of highways and bridges. In 1912, the commission started the Wisconsin Road School. This brought together numerous road professionals to develop construction and maintenance best practices. A highway fund was created in 1925 by charging a tax on fuel of two cents per gallon. The commission received $15.2 million over the next fiscal year. The commission was reorganized in 1929, changing it to three full-time members. During the 1930s and 1940s, the responsibilities of the commission continued to expand. By 1940, it had 500 employees. In 1967, the Highway Commission was merged with the Wisconsin Aeronautics Commission, Department of Motor Vehicles, and the Wisconsin State Patrol to form the Wisconsin Department of Transportation.

In 2014, Wisconsin voters ratified an amendment to the state constitution enshrining the existence of the state Department of Transportation, and requiring that transportation-related taxes and fees must be deposited in a transportation fund, which can be used solely for transportation-related purposes.

== Structure ==
The department is led by the executive offices. This level is composed of the Office of Public Affairs, the Office of General Counsel and the Office of Policy, Finance, and Improvement as well as the positions of secretary deputy secretary, and assistant deputy secretary. Below this, there are five divisions.

=== Division of Business management ===
The DBM does the general business work for the department. It contains the department's human resources services and information technology support. Its tasks include:

- Fiscal managing of the department's projects
- Managing of facilities and equipment
- Centralized purchasing
- Risk mitigation and employee safety services
- Maintaining records and forms
- Supporting communication

=== Division of Motor Vehicles ===
The DMV provides services to drivers. It has 90 locations throughout the state. Its tasks include:

- Educating and testing drivers
- Issuing driver's licenses
- Issuing license plates
- Registering vehicle titles
- Maintaining records of vehicle related transactions
- Providing vehicle emission testing

=== Division of Transportation Investment Management ===
The DTIM serves a wide variety of functions. It contains the Aeronautics Bureau. It also works with planning projects and assisting in mass transit. Its tasks include:

- Educating pilots
- Regulating tall structures
- Providing technical assistance to airports
- Collecting and analyzing data
- Developing multi-year highway plans
- Assisting local government in construction and maintenance of roads

=== Division of Transportation System Development ===
The DTSD is responsible for constructing, maintaining, and operating the state's highways. It is divided into statewide bureaus and five regional offices that serve different parts of the state. Its task include:

- Planning and constructing projects
- Protecting public interests
- Monitoring quality and efficiency of programs
- Collaborating with local governments

=== Division of State Patrol ===
The DSP administers the Wisconsin State Patrol. Its tasks include:

- Enforcing laws
- Assisting drivers
- Inspecting vehicles such as trucks, buses, and ambulances
- Operating weighing facilities
- Training law enforcement officers
- Assisting local law enforcement agencies
- Educating the public

== Funding ==
The department uses the state's Transportation Fund, which is separate from the General Fund. Money in this fund can only be used for transportation purposes. A majority of revenue, about 56%, is provided by the state. This is raised mainly through the gas tax and vehicle registration fees. Another 24% comes federal funding. The remaining revenue comes from bonds and other funds. In the state's 2015-2017 budget, the Department received a total of $6.82 billion. This consisted of $3,852.6 million from the gas tax and fees, $1,655 million from federal funds, $910.7 million from bonds, $229.9 million of general purpose revenue, and $227.9 million from other funds.

== Initiatives ==
The department runs a Transportation Reading Challenge to use transportation as a theme to encourage kids to read. The challenge allows kids ten and under to participate by reading stories that contain various types of transportation. They must record the books on a reading challenge ticket which is then sent to the Office of Public Affairs to win prizes.

== Secretaries (1967–present) ==
#	Secretary	Took office	Left office	Notes
1	G. H. Bakke	August 1, 1967	January 8, 1971	Appointed by Warren P. Knowles.
2	Norman Clapp	January 8, 1971	January 4, 1975	Appointed by Patrick Lucey.
3	Zell S. Rice	January 4, 1975	July 1, 1977	Appointed by Patrick Lucey.
4	Dale Cattanach	July 1, 1977	January 1, 1979	Appointed by Patrick Lucey.
5	Lowell B. Jackson	January 1, 1979	September 1, 1981	Appointed by Lee S. Dreyfus.
6	Owen Ayres	September 1, 1981	January 3, 1983	Appointed by Lee S. Dreyfus.
7	Lowell B. Jackson	January 3, 1983	January 5, 1987	Appointed by Tony Earl.
8	Ronald Fiedler	January 5, 1987	January 1, 1992	Appointed by Tommy Thompson.
9	Charles H. Thompson	January 1, 1992	April 15, 2000	Appointed by Tommy Thompson.
10	Terry Mulcahy	April 15, 2000	January 1, 2002	Appointed by Tommy Thompson.
11	Gene E. Kussart	January 1, 2002	June 1, 2002	Appointed by Scott McCallum.
12	Thomas E. Carlsen	June 1, 2002	January 6, 2003	Appointed by Scott McCallum.
13	Frank J. Busalacchi	January 6, 2003	January 3, 2011	Appointed by Jim Doyle.
14	Mark Gottlieb	January 3, 2011	January 6, 2017	Appointed by Scott Walker.
15	Dave Ross	January 6, 2017	January 7, 2019	Appointed by Scott Walker.
16	Craig Thompson	January 7, 2019	September 11, 2024	Appointed by Tony Evers.
17	Kristina Boardman	September 11, 2024	Current	Appointed by Tony Evers.

== See also ==
- Vehicle registration plates of Wisconsin
