= Charles H. Thompson (Wisconsin official) =

Charles H. Thompson (1935–2012) was the Secretary of the Wisconsin Department of Transportation for eight years. Prior to his role as Secretary, Thompson worked at the Wisconsin Public Service Commission. He was appointed by Governor Tommy Thompson and served from April 1, 1987, to December 31, 1991. Thompson was then appointed to the position of Secretary of the Wisconsin Department of Transportation in January 1992. He retired in 2000 and lived in Florida until his death. He was educated at the University of Wisconsin–Eau Claire.
