= Social media use in the Wisconsin protests =

Since the proliferation of the internet, social media has increasingly played a direct role in modern political issues like civil rights. An example of this is the use of social media during the 2011 Wisconsin protests over public unions that occurred between February and March 2011. Both sides of Wisconsin labor debate used social media networks to galvanize support, though social media use was particularly prevalent amongst the pro-labor side. Many organizations around the country also joined this debate by using social media to voice their own opinions about labor issues in Wisconsin. Through the use of social media, Wisconsin's labor protests escalated from a local state issue into one of national and even international significance.

== Background ==
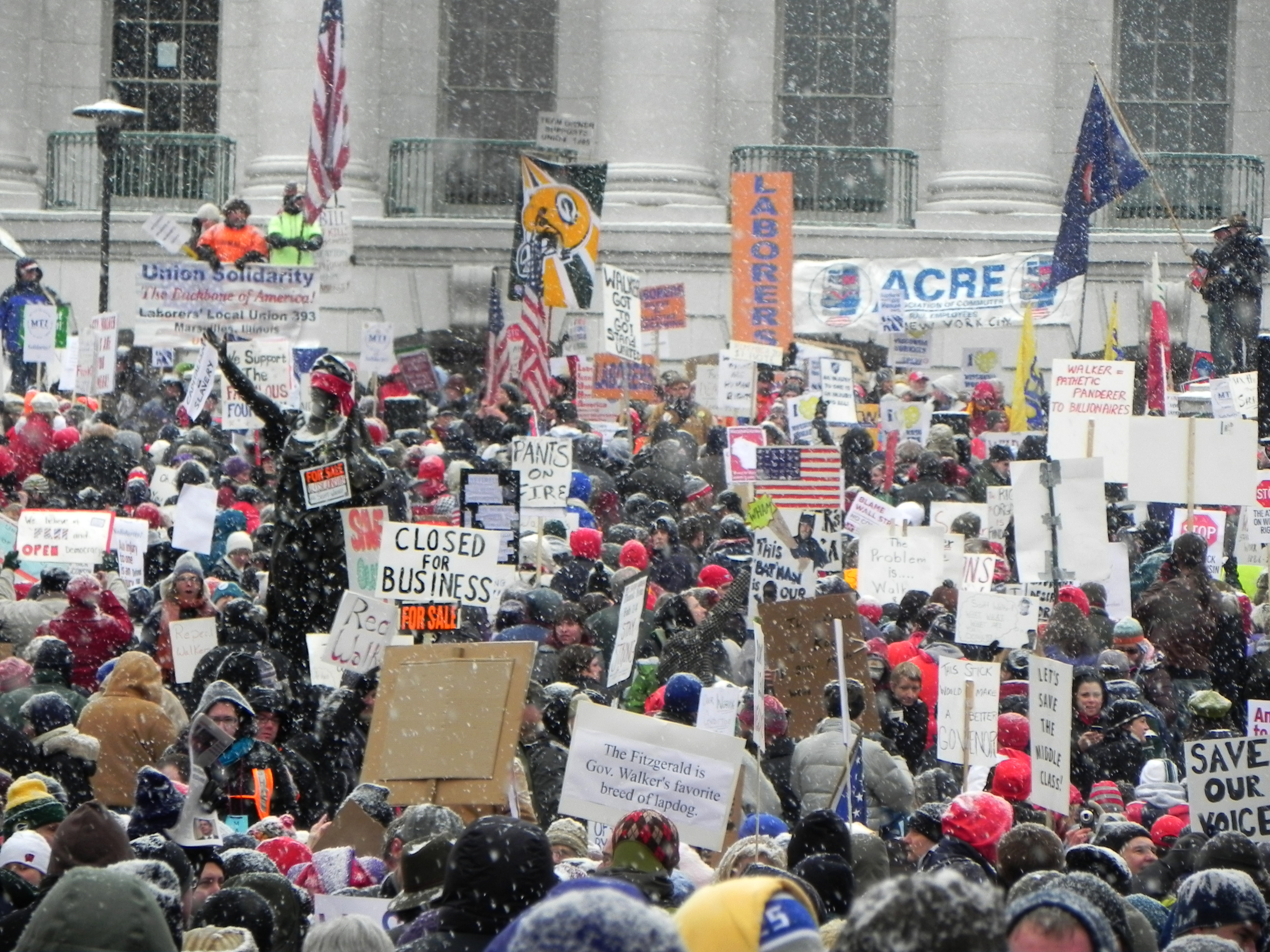
Pro-labor protestors outside the Wisconsin state capitol

The 2011 Wisconsin protests began as the newly sworn-in Wisconsin Governor Scott Walker outlined his plans for substantial reform on labor unions in Assembly Bill 11. On February 11, 2011, his bill included legislation that would significantly restrict the power of labor unions by limiting the collective bargaining rights of labor and limiting the subjects of union discussions to only basic wage talks. The bill also pushed public workers to pay more out-of-pocket for health insurance. These restrictions and cuts were intended to help alleviate Wisconsin's $3.6 billion deficit and better control the state budget. Despite these goals of fiscal responsibility, the people most active in the protests were those most directly impacted by the bill's labor reforms - particularly the limitations imposed on the bargaining rights of unions. These affected people included teachers, clerical workers, prison guards, government employees, and others who benefit from labor unions. The breadth of people who would receive lower wages and pay-cuts made Scott Walker's bill controversial in Wisconsin, and led to the emergence of significant labor protests across Wisconsin.

== Positions ==
=== The protest movement's spread through social media ===
The pro-union side used many forms of social media to sway public opinion and organize protests. Every segment of the population made use of social media's accessibility to contribute to the pro-labor protest movement. For one group of college students, after a student meeting they decided to use social media to push for their teachers' rights. They formed a group called the "Wisconsin Students for Solidarity" and organized a student walkout using Facebook. Their student walkout that started as a local Wisconsin affair grew to become a nationwide event called the "Nationwide Student Walkout" on Facebook. Students also used social media to coordinate the Valentine's Day protests, during which more than 1,000 people, including hundreds of UW-Madison students, utilized Twitter and Facebook for real-time mobilization and outreach.

In another example, during the first night of the teacher strikes in February, 2011, social media was used to connect the protestors to a global community. A local pro-labor pizza restaurant, Ian's Pizza, used Facebook and Twitter to raise awareness and donations for the teachers striking in Wisconsin. Highlighting the speed by which information travels through social media, Ian Pizza's use of Facebook, Twitter, and reaching out to local news stations resulted in Ian's Pizza receiving donations from people from 14 different countries - including Korea, Finland, New Zealand, Egypt, Denmark, Australia, Canada, Germany, China, England, Netherlands, Turkey, Switzerland, Italy - and all 50 states in the United States. These donations sent thousands of free pizzas and slices to the protestors throughout the duration of the protests.

In further examples of how Facebook organizing was frequently utilized by the Wisconsin protestors, numerous Facebook event pages like "Recall Wisconsin Governor Scott Walker", "540,000 To See Scott Walker out of WI, January 2012", and "Recall Scott Walker", were established and shared on Facebook to organize pro-labor supporters and generate popular support. Similarly, satirical Twitter accounts were created like "Not Scott Walker", frequently writing humorous tweets during the protests to attract viral attention to the Wisconsin issue. Wisconsin union ironworkers also used Facebook to coordinate protests. In a quote from one of the union ironworkers, "[Facebook organizing] grew to a network, so that whenever Governor Walker traveled someplace, we would find people wherever he was going that would meet him and protest." In all of these examples, Facebook and other social media platforms were key to the popular success of the protests.

In a specific example, an attorney named Bill Mahler also decided to close his law firm early on March 11 in a show of support for the unions. Mahler used both his blog and Twitter account to put pressure on Governor Walker, and encourage other law firms to do the same. Showing the geographic range of supporters that the Wisconsin labor issue attracted, Mahler and his legal firm were not located in Wisconsin, but in Seattle, Washington. This fact accentuates how social media enabled the wide, rapid movement of information and ideas beyond where an issue is centralized. The widespread effectiveness of social media in organizing protestors also influenced the legislation of other states. After the Wisconsin protests drew international support through social media, Indiana Republicans dropped a similar bill to Assembly Bill 11, under pressure from Indiana Democrats and other union supporters.

The news also played a role in driving support for the protests on social media. The Associated Press published a story with private quotes from Governor Walker threatening to use the National Guard to forcefully shut down the protests. Left-leaning networks and labor groups shared this story on social media to galvanize support for the pro-labor movement in Wisconsin. News of the Arab Spring in Egypt was also used by pro-labor movements to support the Wisconsin protestors and draw parallels between the two protests in both literal and metaphorical ways. An Egyptian man posted on Facebook a photo of himself holding a sign saying, "EGYPT Supports Wisconsin Workers: One World, One Pain", during the Arab Spring. According to Andy Kroll, a writer for The Nation, the popularity of the Arab Spring on social media helped push young people around the world, including in Wisconsin, to similarly use Facebook and Twitter to organize and protest for a cause they believed in.

=== Social media use by Governor Walker and his supporters ===
On the other side of the protests, Governor Scott Walker used Twitter to articulate his ideas on labor, communicate with those who agreed with him. and allow people who disagree with him to respond. Governor Scott Walker was one of the first politicians in Wisconsin to actively use social media to connect with both his followers and his opponents. Some of the tweets have even been looked at as actively negotiating with the Unions, by some writers. Following the lead of the pro-labor protestors, Governor Walker's supporters used the same mediums of social media to build support in not only Wisconsin, but in the entire nation. One website, "americansforprosperity.org," had a petition set up on their website for Governor Walker's supporters to sign and directly show their popular support for Governor Walker's reforms. This site also had Twitter updates and a link to a Facebook page. Other major political figures have also used the internet to voice their support for the governor. Former Minnesota governor Tim Pawlenty posted a video and started a petition on his website. Also, former Speaker of the House, Newt Gingrich, posted a public appeal on a conservative website in support of Governor Walker. While social media use was most prevalent amongst the protestors, supporters of Assembly Bill 11 also utilized social media to a significant degree.

=== Impact of social media on the 2011 Wisconsin protests ===
The 2011 Wisconsin protests were some of the first instances in which social media played a significant role in mobilizing protestors. According to the Milwaukee Journal Sentinel, it allowed for an unprecedented mobilization of people and ideas. Without the use of social media, it is possible that a movement as large as the 2011 Wisconsin protests would not have reached such an international scale, nor emerged so quickly.

Social media use also contributed to the overnight occupation of the Wisconsin state capitol by protestors. When Republican lawmakers were returning to Wisconsin during the night to vote on and pass Assembly Bill 11, pro-union news reporters and organizers used Twitter to quickly mobilize protestors to the capitol on a short notice. Since it was during the night, no news stations were reporting on the issue. However, social media in the form of Twitter and Facebook, supported by the wide proliferation of smartphones, enabled the protestors to quickly organize without mobilization support from traditional public media like the news.

== Media ==
On Twitter, people used the hashtag "#wiunion" to tag tweets related to the protests.
