= Laura Gutiérrez =

Wisconsin Secretary of the Department of Safety and Professional Services
- In office May 2, 2017 – Jan 7, 2019
- Governor: Scott Walker
- Preceded by: Dave Ross

Personal details
- Born: August 18, 1973 (age 53)
- Children: 4
- Education: Carroll University, Marquette University
- Website: Government website

Laura Gutiérrez is an education leader and current Associate Executive Director of the United Community Center. She is the former Secretary of the Wisconsin Department of Safety and Professional Services.

== Education ==
Gutiérrez received a bachelor of science degree from Carroll University and a master of arts in leadership and policy from Marquette University.

== Career ==
In January 2019, Gutiérrez returned to the United Community Center to serve as the Associate Executive Director. Prior to her appointment as a Wisconsin cabinet secretary, Gutiérrez served as vice president of academic affairs at St. Anthony School in Milwaukee. She previously served as assistant principal and director of instruction at Bruce Guadalupe Community School, a part of the United Community Center, in Milwaukee. Gutiérrez was an elementary and middle school instructor since 1998, including 6th-10th grade Spanish instructor at Grand Avenue Middle School, science instructor at Grand Avenue Middle School, science instructor at Bruce Guadalupe Community School, and science consultant at Bruce Guadalupe Community School. From 2008 to 2009, Gutiérrez worked as a clinical and microbiology laboratory assistant at Waukesha Memorial Hospital.

Gutiérrez completed the district administrator licensure program at Cardinal Stritch University and received her superintendent license in 2016.

Political offices
Preceded by Dave Ross	Wisconsin Secretary of the Department of Safety and Professional Services; 2017–2019	Succeeded by Dawn Crim
