= Wisconsin State Patrol =

State Police Force for the State of Wisconsin

- Patch of Wisconsin State Patrol

- Logo of Wisconsin State Patrol

Agency overview
- Formed: September 1, 1939; 87 years ago
- Employees: 615 (as of 2020)

Jurisdictional structure
- Operations jurisdiction: Wisconsin, United States
- Area: 65,498 square miles (169,640 km^{2})
- Population: 5,757,564 (2014 est)
- General nature: Civilian police

Operational structure
- Headquarters: Madison, Wisconsin
- Sworn members: 512 (authorized, as of 2024)
- Unsworn members: 141 (as of 2014)
- Agency executive: Tim Carnahan, Superintendent
- Parent agency: Wisconsin Department of Transportation
- Regions: 5

Website
- wsp.wi.gov

The Wisconsin State Patrol is the state patrol for the state of Wisconsin. A division of the Wisconsin Department of Transportation, the Wisconsin State Patrol enforces traffic and criminal laws; oversees motor carrier safety and weight facilities (SWEFs); inspects and regulates motor carriers, school buses, and ambulances; and assists local law enforcement agencies with traffic safety, civil disturbances and disasters (natural and man-made).

== History ==
Prior to 1939, some statewide enforcement efforts were made through other government departments. In 1917, the Dairy and Food Department and the Oil Inspection Department were legally authorized to conduct investigations of licensing and vehicle sale laws. In 1931, the State Highway Administration had personnel dedicated to checking truck traffic and weights.

On September 1, 1939, the Wisconsin legislature passed a statute creating the Motor Vehicle Department, which consisted of three divisions. The new Enforcement Division began with 46 inspectors, comprised from five smaller agencies within other departments, to enforce the state motor vehicle code and regulate motor carriers. There were 33 Public Service Commission transportation inspectors, 8 Inspection Bureau inspectors and 5 Secretary of State investigators. The new traffic officers were supplied with a siren, flashing red lights, police license plates, and an official shield for the sides of their personal cars. The state also paid for gasoline, oil, and grease.

State Patrol radio first went on the air February 1, 1943, operating station WIZR on a frequency of 31.5 megahertz. It was able to communicate with the patrol's mobile units and with most of the municipal and county law enforcement short-wave stations.

In 2000, the statutory limit for the number of troopers in the state was increased from 375 to 400.

The State Patrol currently operates 16 safety and weight enforcement facilities throughout Wisconsin.

The Wisconsin State Patrol Academy at Fort McCoy provides diverse law enforcement training programs for federal, state and local law enforcement officers.

== Mission ==
Weigh station near Sparta

The State Patrol provides traffic safety and enforcement services for Wisconsin. Its primary mission is to enforce the provisions of the Wisconsin Motor Vehicle laws and other laws to prevent crime. State troopers and inspectors have statewide jurisdiction for traffic and criminal enforcement.

These are the services provided statewide by the agency:

- Traffic law enforcement through freeway patrols and major highways
- Accident scene reconstruction and crime scene mapping for investigations
- Motor carrier safety inspections
- Commercial vehicle size and weight enforcement
- Inspections of school buses, ambulances, motor coaches, and salvage vehicles
- Evaluation and maintenance of breath-alcohol testing equipment; training for some county and local law enforcement agencies in using such equipment
- Assistance to county and local law enforcement agencies when requested
- Law enforcement training at the Wisconsin State Patrol Academy
- Traffic safety programs

Troopers typically patrol an assigned geographic area along key travel corridors like interstates and other multi-lane freeways. Their primary duties are to ensure safe traffic movement, respond to crashes or other incidents, assist stranded motorists and local law enforcement agencies.

Inspectors, along with traffic enforcement duties, receive additional training regarding federal motor carrier rules that affect commercial motor vehicles and commercial license drivers. Inspectors often work out of one of the State Patrol's 13 Safety and Weight Enforcement Facilities (SWEFs) across the state. SWEFs at key state border locations incorporate weigh-in-motion devices and indoor inspection bays to ensure public safety and the efficient movement of commerce.

The State Patrol maintains and manages the facilities of the Mobile Data Communications Network (MDCN), a system that supports remote access to information available from the United States Department of Justice. The service is provided free of charge to allied criminal justice agencies in Wisconsin.

== Training ==
A training academy was established in 1955 to offer formal educational instruction in partnership with the Northwestern University Traffic Institute. Since 1957, the agency has been training its recruits with its own staff. The Wisconsin State Patrol Academy in Fort McCoy sits on 50 acres (200,000 m^{2}) and is used to train State Patrol recruits and some county and local law enforcement agency personnel on the latest techniques in traffic law enforcement. Training for recruits lasts 26 weeks in a paramilitary setting.

Prior to joining the academy, recruits must pass several phases during initial testing: a physical agility test, a background investigation, an interview, and psychological/medical exams.

== The State Patrol today ==
The State Patrol became part of the Wisconsin Department of Transportation in the 1960s, and was designated a DOT division in 1977. In 2003, the Bureau of Transportation Safety was incorporated into the State Patrol.

In 2005 the State Patrol reorganized and went from seven districts to five regions.

1. Southwest Region DeForest and Tomah Posts
2. Southeast Region Waukesha Post
3. Northeast Region Fond du Lac Post
4. North Central Region Wausau Post
5. Northwest Region Eau Claire and Spooner Posts

In 2026, the Northeast Region Post will be relocated to a new post being constructed along Interstate 41 near the village of Wrightstown in the Appleton Metro area.

The central office is in the Hill Farms State Office Building in Madison.

The Bureau of Field Operations (BFO) provides traffic law enforcement services and promotes highway safety in Wisconsin. This is primarily accomplished by troopers, inspectors, and law enforcement dispatchers located in Wisconsin State Patrol Posts and Safety and Weight Enforcement Facilities statewide. The Motor Carrier Enforcement section oversees motor carrier safety and weight facilities (SWEFs), and inspects and regulates motor carriers, school buses, and ambulances. The bureau also enforces criminal and traffic laws, conducts criminal highway interdiction programs, and helps local law enforcement agencies with traffic safety, civil disturbances and natural and man-made disasters.

Specialized Services within the Wisconsin State Patrol Bureau of Field Operations include: a K9 unit, with K9s certified in narcotics detection and explosive substance detection; an Honor Guard unit; an Air Support Unit with pilots and aircraft (including unmanned drones) strategically spread throughout the state; a Mobile Field Force unit; a motorcycle unit; a SWAT team that is able to rapidly deploy when needed; and a Technical Reconstruction Unit for investigation of particularly serious crashes.

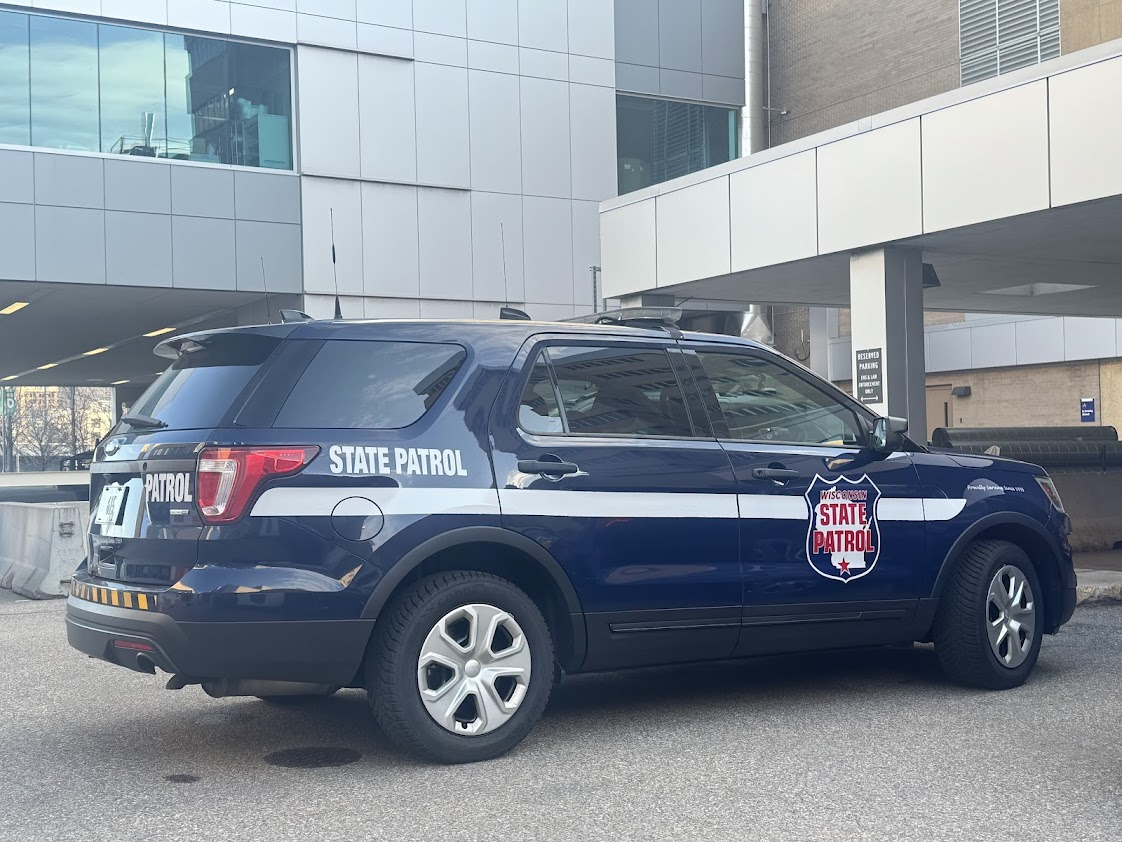
Wisconsin State Patrol Ford Police Interceptor Utility (Explorer)

The State Patrol uses marked and unmarked vehicles, as well as motorcycles and airplanes.

Since 2020, troopers have been armed with the Glock 17 9mm pistol as their standard issue sidearm. All troopers also carry M4-style rifles.

== Strength ==
As of 2020, Wisconsin had 512 troopers and inspectors, including first line supervisors and executive management.

== Fallen officers ==
Since the establishment of the Wisconsin State Patrol, there have been eight deaths in the line of duty.

== Rank structure ==
Title	Insignia
Superintendent	
Colonel	Colonel_Gold_eagle
Lieutenant Colonel	
Major	
Captain	
Lieutenant	
Sergeant	Florida_Highway_Patrol_Sergeant_Insignia
Master Trooper/Inspector	Florida_Highway_Patrol_Master_Corporal_Insignia
Senior Trooper/Inspector	Florida_Highway_Patrol_Senior_Corporal_Insignia
Trooper/Inspector	FHP_Corporal_2018
Trooper/Inspector (Probationary)	FL_Hwy_Patrol_Trooper_First_Class_Blue

== See also ==
- List of law enforcement agencies in Wisconsin
- State police
- Highway patrol
