= U.S. Route 51 in Wisconsin =

Section of U.S. Highway in Wisconsin, United States

U.S. Highway 51
- US 51 highlighted in red

Route information
- Maintained by WisDOT
- Length: 316.59 mi (509.50 km)
- Existed: November 11, 1926–present

Major junctions
- South end: US 51 in Beloit
- US 14 in Janesville; I-39 / I-90 / WIS 73 in Edgerton; I-39 / I-90 in Stoughton; US 12 / US 18 in Madison; US 151 in Madison; I-39 / I-90 / I-94 in Madison; I-39 in Portage; US 10 / WIS 66 in Stevens Point; I-39 / WIS 29 in Rothschild; US 8 in Bradley
- North end: US 2 / LSCT in Hurley

Location
- Country: United States
- State: Wisconsin
- Counties: Rock, Dane, Columbia, Marquette, Waushara, Portage, Marathon, Lincoln, Oneida, Vilas, Iron

Highway system
- United States Numbered Highway System; List; Special; Divided; Wisconsin State Trunk Highway System; Interstate; US; State; Scenic; Rustic
← WIS 50	→ WIS 51
← US 10	WIS 10	→ WIS 11

U.S. Highway 51 (US 51) in the U.S. state of Wisconsin runs north–south through the central part of the state. It enters from Illinois at Beloit, and runs north to its northern terminus in Hurley at a roundabout junction with US 2. Some of the route of US 51 runs concurrently with Interstate 39 (I-39).

== Route description ==
=== Beloit to Stevens Point ===
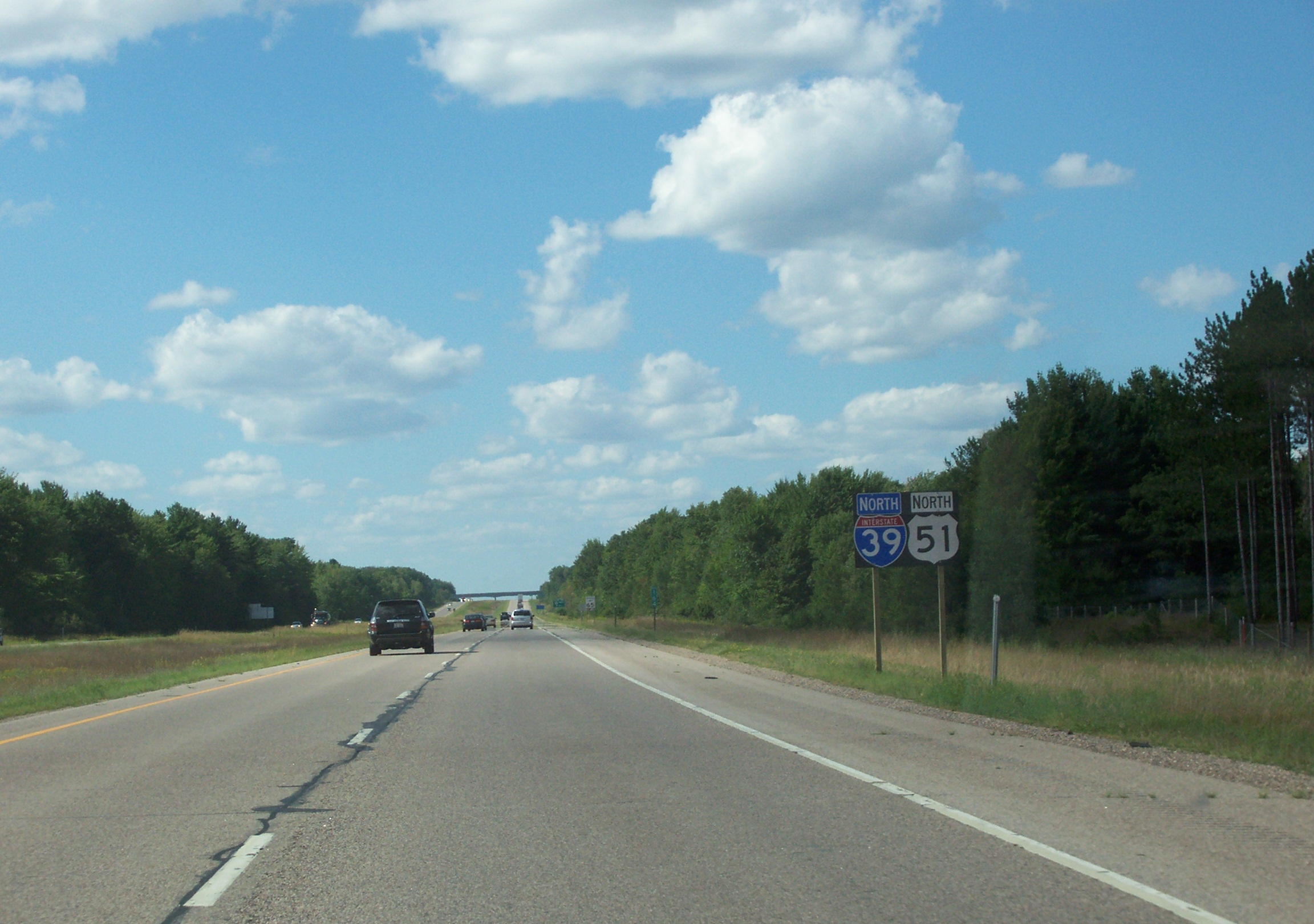
US 51, along with I-39, in northern Wisconsin

US 51 enters Wisconsin in Beloit on Broad Street as a four-lane divided highway but immediately merges into a two-lane urban road. The route turns right onto Pleasant Street and begins running along the Rock River. The road passes Beloit College and crosses Wisconsin Highway 81 (WIS 81) before leaving Beloit and going toward Janesville. Along the way, it goes under the Wisconsin and Southern railroad and turns away from the river and passes Southern Wisconsin Regional Airport. US 51 becomes a four-lane undivided highway as it crosses WIS 11.

As US 51 enters Janesville, it crosses the Rock River and runs on Center Street. The road turns northeast, running parallel to the WSOR railroad before crossing the river again and turning onto North Parker Drive. US 51 passes under the railroad and temporarily becomes a four-lane divided highway as it parallels the Rock River again. US 51 leaves Janesville as a two-lane road and crosses US 14 as it makes its way to Edgerton. Along the way it crosses the Rock River. US 51 passes through Edgerton. A few miles north of Edgerton, joins with I-39/I-90 for about five miles (8.0 km) before splitting off and heading west to Stoughton. In Stoughton, US 51 turns north and passes Lake Kegonsa and goes through McFarland, where it becomes an expressway. The expressway enters Madison and crosses the Beltline (US 12/US 18) and continues through the east side of Madison as a side route, known locally as Stoughton Road, paralleling to the west of I-39/I-90. The expressway crosses WIS 30 and US 151, where it downgrades to an urban four-lane road. Between WIS 30 and US 151, the highway is crossed by a railroad track at the surface. US 51 passes Madison Area Technical College and Dane County Regional Airport before going under the Interstate.

North of Madison, US 51 parallels the Interstate on the east side passing through De Forest, Leeds, North Leeds, Poynette and Portage. In North Leeds, US 51 intersects WIS 22 and WIS 60 at a roundabout; US 51 heads west a bit with WIS 60 before splitting back north toward Poynette. The route joins I-39 north of Portage. There is a short concurrency with WIS 23 from Endeavor to WIS 82 near Oxford. US 51 stays joined with I-39 until the Interstate ends at WIS 29. Along the way, the route bypasses the small communities of Endeavor, Packwaukee, Westfield, Coloma, Hancock, Plainfield, Plover, and Whiting prior to arriving at Stevens Point. In Stevens Point, the route runs concurrently with US 10.

=== Stevens Point to Merrill ===
Proceeding north from Stevens Point, the highway bypasses Knowlton, Mosinee, and Rothschild where I-39 terminates at the WIS 29 east interchange. Along the way, US 10 turns to go west toward Minneapolis. US 51 continues on with WIS 29 for five miles (8.0 km) bypassing Schofield, then proceeding into Wausau where WIS 29 splits to the west.

After Wausau, US 51 continues as a freeway to Merrill. Along the way, it passes Brokaw. For much of this stretch, the highway follows the Wisconsin River. The highway passes an exit with County Trunk Highway Q (CTH-Q) just before crossing the Wisconsin River. It then passes Merrill, with exits at WIS 64 and CTH-K.

=== Merrill to Hurley ===
A few miles north of Merrill, the freeway downgrades to an expressway for nine miles (14 km). Within the expressway exists six grade intersections at Lincoln Drive, CTH-K (Nelson Avenue), CTH-J, CTH-V, a private road, Tamarack Lane; as well as several private driveways. The highway resumes as a freeway and passes three Tomahawk exits, CTH-S. WIS 86/CTH-D, and CTH-A. Between WIS 86 and CTH-A, the highway crosses the Wisconsin River. Just before the freeway ends again it passes an exit with US 8.

Just after the US 8 exit, at the Oneida County line, the freeway ends again and merges into a two-lane rural road. The highway passes through Hazelhurst and becomes a four-lane undivided highway. The highway then passes through Minocqua and Woodruff. WIS 70 runs concurrently with US 51 for a few miles in Woodruff. For much of this stretch the highway runs parallel to the old Milwaukee Road right-of-way, now the Bear Skin State Trail.

North of Woodruff, the highway becomes a two-lane road again. North of Woodruff, the highway turns northwest and passes through Manitowish Waters, and Mercer. Shortly after Mercer, the highway turns to go straight north and goes through Hurley. Just after Hurley, US 51 ends at a roundabout with US 2 just a couple hundred feet west of the Michigan border.

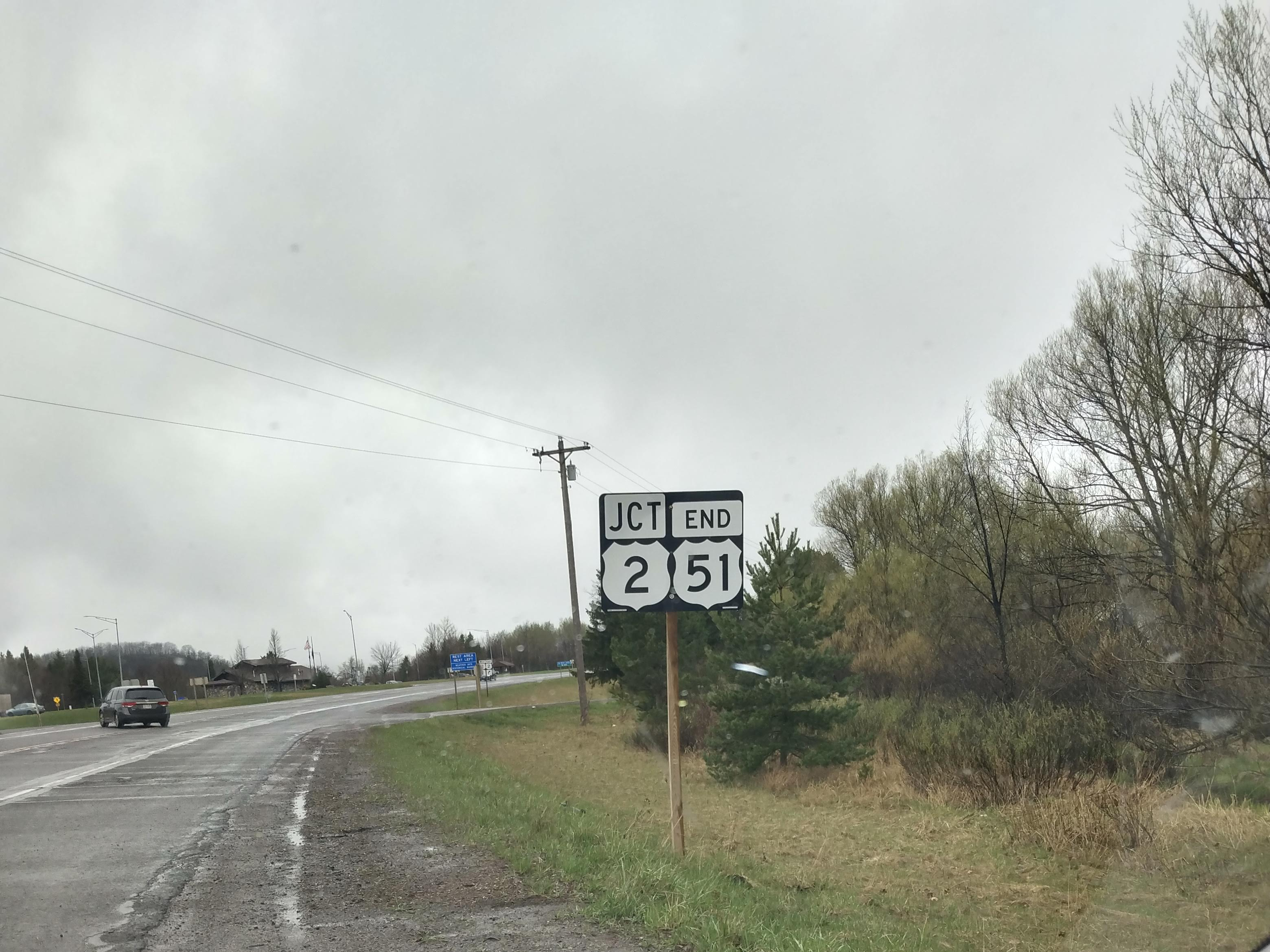
US 51's northern terminus at US 2 near Hurley, May 2024

== History ==
Prior to 1926, what is now US 51 was State Trunk Highway 10.

US 51 was widened to a full freeway over a period of 25 years from Merrill to Portage. The freeway continues around Portage to the west as I-39 (originally as WIS 78) to connect with I-90 and I-94 while US 51 continues along surface roads into and through Portage. In the 1990s, US 51 was designated as I-39 from its junction with WIS 29 eastbound in Wausau to where it left the freeway at exit 92 in Portage. US 51 remained cosigned with I-39 along this entire stretch of road. Further expansion of the highway northward took place in 2000, when the highway was widened to an expressway up to CTH-S. In addition, a super-two freeway from CTH-S to US 8 was widened to a four-lane freeway. In 2009 the grade intersection of Star Drive north of Merrill was removed, shortening the 11-mile expressway to nine miles.

A project expanding US 51 and reconfiguring interchanges with WIS 29 in the Wausau area was completed in 2010 at a cost of $309 million. Based on the high cost and limited benefits, this project was included in WisPIRGs list of highway boondoggles.

The Wisconsin segment of US 51 is designated as the Korean War Veterans Memorial Highway.

In the 2020s, the entire US 51 corridor was designated as an Alternative Fuel Corridor for electric vehicles.

== Exit list ==
County	Location	mi	km	Exit	Destinations	Notes
Rock	Beloit	0.00	0.00		US 51 south – South Beloit, Rockford	Continuation into Illinois
Rock	Beloit	1.49– 1.50	2.40– 2.41		WIS 81 to I-39 / I-90	
Rock	Town of Rock	10.69– 10.70	17.20– 17.22		WIS 11 – Brodhead, Monroe, Delavan	
Rock	Janesville	14.36	23.11		WIS 26 north (Centerway Street)	Southern terminus of WIS 26
Rock	Janesville	13.39	21.55		Bus. US 14 east	Southern end of Bus. US 14 concurrency
Rock	Janesville	13.75	22.13		Bus. US 14 west	Northern end of Bus. US 14 concurrency
Rock	Town of Janesville	17.49	28.15		US 14 / Alt. I-39 south / Alt. I-90 east – Evansville, Chicago	Southern end of Alt. I-39/Alt. I-90 concurrency
Rock	Edgerton	25.39	40.86		WIS 59 – Evansville, Milton	
Dane	Town of Albion	28.20– 28.61	45.38– 46.04		I-39 south / I-90 east – Chicago WIS 73 north / Alt. I-39 north / Alt. I-90 west – Deerfield	Northern end of Alt. I-39/Alt. I-90 concurrency; southern end of I-39/I-90 concurrency
Dane	Town of Albion	32.07	51.61		I-39 north / I-90 west – Madison	Northern end of I-39/I-90 concurrency
Dane	Stoughton	39.86	64.15		WIS 138 south – Cooksville	Southern end of WIS 138 concurrency
Dane	Town of Dunkirk	40.83	65.71		WIS 138 north – Oregon	Northern end of WIS 138 concurrency
Dane	McFarland	49.67	79.94		Siggelkow Road	Interchange
Dane	Madison	51.22– 51.23	82.43– 82.45		US 12 / US 18 / Alt. I-39 south / Alt. I-90 east	Southern end of Alt. I-39/Alt. I-90 concurrency; US 12 exit 266
Dane	Town of Blooming Grove	53.75	86.50		CTH-BB (Cottage Grove Road)	Interchange
Dane	Town of Blooming Grove	54.93	88.40		Milwaukee Street / Corporate Drive	Interchange; Corporate Dr. not signed northbound
Dane	Town of Blooming Grove	55.40	89.16		WIS 30 east / Alt. I-94 east WIS 30 west (Aberg Avenue)	Southern end of Alt. I-94 concurrency; WIS 30 exit 1C
Dane	Madison	56.28– 56.29	90.57– 90.59		US 151 (Washington Avenue)	
Dane	Town of Burke	60.61– 60.63	97.54– 97.57		I-39 / I-90 / I-94 – Janesville, Wisconsin Dells	I-90 exit 132
Dane	Town of Burke	61.70– 61.74	99.30– 99.36	61	WIS 19 – Sun Prairie, Waunakee	South end of freeway
Dane	Town of Windsor	63.25	101.79	63	Windsor Road	Dumbbell interchange
Dane	DeForest			65	CTH-V – DeForest	North end of freeway
Columbia	Town of Leeds	71.10	114.42		WIS 22 north – Wyocena, Pardeeville	Southern terminus of WIS 22
Columbia	Town of Leeds	71.54	115.13		WIS 60 east – Columbus	Eastern end of WIS 60 concurrency
Columbia	Town of Arlington	73.48	118.25		WIS 60 west – Arlington, Lodi	Western end of WIS 60 concurrency
Columbia	Town of Dekorra	84.76– 84.84	136.41– 136.54		WIS 16 east – Columbus	Southern end of WIS 16 concurrency
Columbia	Portage	88.98	143.20		WIS 16 west (Wisconsin Street) / Alt. I-39 north / Alt. I-90 west / Alt. I-94 west – Wisconsin Dells	Northern end of WIS 16/Alt. I-39/Alt. I-90/Alt. I-94 concurrency
Columbia	Portage	89.10	143.39		WIS 33 (Cook Street) – Baraboo, Fox Lake	
Columbia	Town of Fort Winnebago	91.94	147.96		I-39 south – Madison	Southern end of I-39 concurrency; I-39 exit 92
Marquette	Town of Moundville	100.38	161.55	100	WIS 23 west / CTH-P – Wisconsin Dells, Endeavor	South end of freeway section; southern end of WIS 23 overlap
Marquette	Town of Oxford	104.56	168.27	104	CTH-D – Packwaukee	Northbound exit and southbound entrance
Marquette	Town of Oxford	106.72	171.75	106	WIS 23 east / WIS 82 west – Oxford, Montello	Northern end of WIS 23 overlap
Marquette	Westfield	113.27	182.29	113	CTH-E / CTH-J – Westfield	
Waushara	Coloma	124.24	199.94	124	WIS 21 – Coloma, Necedah	
Waushara	Town of Hancock	131.30	211.31	131	CTH-V – Hancock	
Waushara	Town of Plainfield	136.85	220.24	136	WIS 73 – Plainfield, Wisconsin Rapids	
Portage	Town of Pine Grove	140.02	225.34	139	CTH-D – Almond	
Portage	Town of Pine Grove	143.51	230.96	143	CTH-W – Bancroft, Wisconsin Rapids	
Portage	Town of Plover	150.85	242.77	151	WIS 54 (Post Road) / Bus. US 51 – Wisconsin Rapids, Plover, Waupaca	Southern terminus of Bus. US 51
Portage	Village of Plover	153.45	246.95	153	CTH-B (Plover Road) – Wisconsin Rapids, Plover, Amherst	
Portage	Village of Plover	156.48	251.83	156	CTH-HH (McDill Avenue) – Whiting, Stevens Point	
Portage	Stevens Point	158.66	255.34	158	US 10 east / WIS 66 west – Stevens Point, Waupaca, Appleton	Southern end of US 10/WIS 66 concurrency; signed as exits 158A (east) and 158B (west)
Portage	Town of Hull	159.84	257.24	159	WIS 66 east – Stevens Point, Rosholt	Northern end of WI 66 concurrency
Portage	Stevens Point	161.71	260.25	161	Bus. US 51 – Stevens Point	Northern terminus of Bus. US 51
Portage	Town of Hull	163.58	263.26	163	Casimir Road	To CTH-X
Portage	Town of Hull	165.70	266.67	165	US 10 west – Marshfield	Northern end of US 10 concurrency
Portage	Town of Hull			165	CTH-X	Former diamond interchange; removed for construction of US 10 exit
Portage	Town of Dewey	171.34	275.75	171	CTH-DB – Knowlton, Lake DuBay	
Marathon	Town of Knowlton	175.79	282.91	175	WIS 34 – Knowlton, Wisconsin Rapids	
Marathon	Mosinee	179.52	288.91	179	WIS 153 – Mosinee, Elderon	
Marathon	Town of Kronenwetter	181.34	291.84	181	Maple Ridge Road	
Marathon	Rothschild	185.47	298.49	185	Bus. US 51 – Rothschild, Wausau, Schofield	Southern terminus of Bus. US 51
Marathon	Town of Rib Mountain	188.09	302.70	187	WIS 29 east – Weston, Green Bay I-39 ends	Northern terminus of I-39; northern end of I-39 concurrency
Marathon	Town of Rib Mountain	189.03	304.21	188	CTH-N (Rib Mountain Drive)	
Marathon	Town of Rib Mountain	190.64	306.81	190	CTH-NN (North Mountain Road)	
Marathon	Stettin–Wausau line	191.95– 192.49	308.91– 309.78	191A	WIS 29 west – Abbotsford, Chippewa Falls	Northern end of WIS 29 concurrency
Marathon	Stettin–Wausau line	191.95– 192.49	308.91– 309.78	191B	Sherman Street	Northbound exit and southbound entrance only
Marathon	Stettin–Wausau line	192.60	309.96	192	Stewart Avenue	
Marathon	Wausau	193.40	311.25	193	WIS 52 east (Bridge Street)	Western terminus of WIS 52
Marathon	Wausau–Maine line	194.52– 194.73	313.05– 313.39	194	CTH-K / CTH-U (Merrill Avenue) / Bus. US 51 – Wausau	Signed as exits 194A (CTH-U/Merrill Ave.) and 194B (Bus. US 51/CTH-K) northbound; CTH-U (Merrill Ave.) signed northbound only; northern terminus of Bus. US 51
Marathon	Maine	196.43	316.12	197	CTH-WW – Brokaw	
Lincoln	Town of Scott	205.19	330.22	205	CTH-Q – Merrill	
Lincoln	Town of Pine River	208.39– 208.43	335.37– 335.44	208	WIS 64 / WIS 17 – Merrill, Antigo	
Lincoln	Town of Bradley	211.13	339.78	211	CTH-K – Merrill	
Lincoln	Town of Bradley	214.96	345.94		Lincoln Drive	At-grade intersection; north end of freeway
Lincoln	Town of Bradley	225.99	363.70	225	CTH-S – Tomahawk	South end of freeway
Lincoln	Town of Bradley	229.86	369.92	229	WIS 86 / CTH-D – Tomahawk	
Lincoln	Town of Bradley	231.65	372.80	231	CTH-A – Tomahawk	
Lincoln	Town of King	234.22	376.94	234	US 8 – Prentice, Rhinelander	North end of freeway
Oneida	Town of Minocqua	260.71	419.57		WIS 70 west – Fifield	Southern end of WIS 70 concurrency
Oneida	Town of Woodruff	261.39	420.67		WIS 47 – Lac du Flambeau, Rhinelander	
Vilas	Town of Arbor Vitae	263.09	423.40		WIS 70 east – Eagle River	Northern end of WIS 70 concurrency
Iron	Town of Mercer	288.96	465.04		WIS 47 south / WIS 182 west – Lac du Flambeau, Park Falls	Northern terminus of WIS 47; eastern terminus of WIS 182
Iron	Hurley	315.07	507.06		WIS 77 west (Silver Street) – Montreal, Mellen	Eastern terminus of WIS 77
Iron	Town of Kimball	316.44– 316.59	509.26– 509.50		US 2 / LSCT – Ashland, Superior, Ironwood	Roundabout; former interchange; northern terminus
1.000 mi = 1.609 km; 1.000 km = 0.621 mi: Concurrency terminus; Incomplete access

== See also ==
U.S. Route 51
Previous state: Illinois	Wisconsin	Next state: Terminus
