= Interstate 39 =

Interstate Highway in Illinois and Wisconsin

Interstate 39
- I-39 highlighted in red

Route information
- Maintained by IDOT, ISTHA and WisDOT
- Length: 306.14 mi (492.68 km)
- Existed: 1986–present
- NHS: Entire route

Major junctions
- South end: I-55 / US 51 in Normal, IL
- I-80 in LaSalle, IL; I-88 Toll / IL 110 (CKC) in Rochelle, IL; I-90 Toll in Cherry Valley, IL; I-43 / WIS 81 in Beloit, WI; I-94 / WIS 30 in Madison, WI; I-90 / I-94 / WIS 78 in Portage, WI
- North end: US 51 / WIS 29 near Rothschild, WI

Location
- Country: United States
- States: Illinois, Wisconsin
- Counties: IL: McLean, Woodford, Marshall, LaSalle, Lee, Ogle, Winnebago; WI: Rock, Dane, Columbia, Marquette, Waushara, Portage, Marathon

Highway system
- Interstate Highway System; Main; Auxiliary; Suffixed; Business; Future
- Illinois State Highway System; Interstate; US; State; Tollways; Scenic
- Wisconsin State Trunk Highway System; Interstate; US; State; Scenic; Rustic
| ← IL 38 | IL | → US 40 |
| ← WIS 38 | WI | → WIS 39 |

Interstate 39 (I-39) is a north–south Interstate Highway in Illinois and Wisconsin that runs from an interchange at I-55 in Normal, Illinois, to State Trunk Highway 29 (WIS 29) approximately six miles (9.7 km) south of Wausau, Wisconsin. In total, Interstate 39 is 306.14 miles (492.68 km) long. In Illinois, the route has a total length of 140.82 miles (226.63 km); in Wisconsin, I-39 has a length of 182 miles (293 km).

Among the newest Interstate Highways in Illinois, I-39 was completed in 1992. Designed to replace U.S. Route 51 (US 51) with an Interstate-grade freeway, the highway runs concurrently with US 20 in Rockford before joining I-90. From Rockford to Portage, Wisconsin, I-39 and I-90 run concurrently. From Madison to Portage, I-94 joins the two; at 29 miles (47 km), the three-way concurrency is the longest in the country. From Portage northward, US 51 rejoins I-39, and the Interstate uses its mileposts northward.

== Route description ==
=== Illinois ===
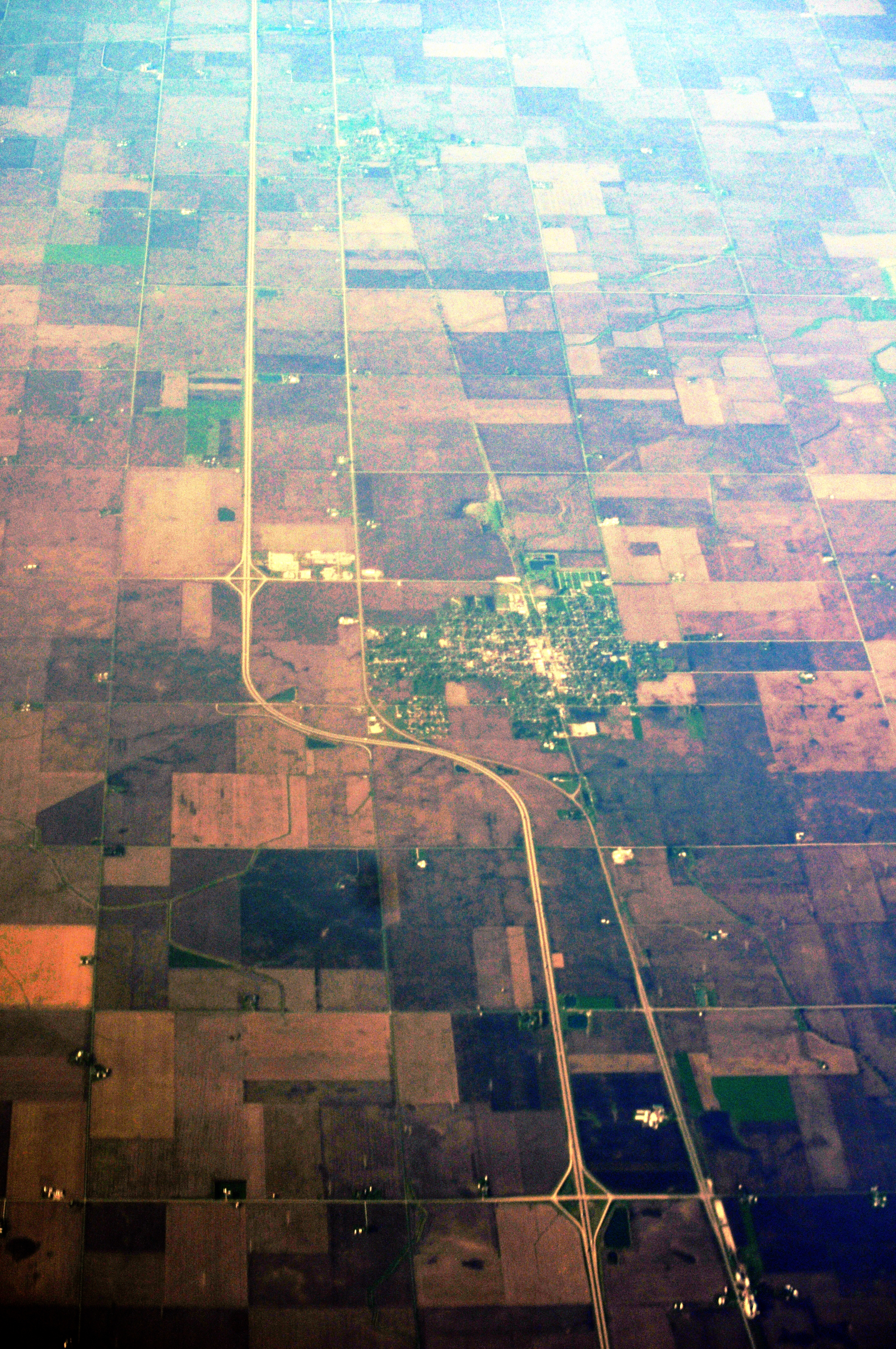
Aerial view of I-39 as it passes Minonk, Illinois, April 2012

In Illinois, I-39 begins at I-55 north of Bloomington–Normal, Illinois, less than one mile east from the intersection of I-74 and I-55 that runs around the city of Normal. US 51 splits from I-55, joining I-39; exit 2 marks the northern terminus of the US 51 business route. From Normal northward, I-39 runs northward largely through rural areas. At exit 8, the route forms the southern terminus of Illinois Route 251 (IL 251), which was derived from the original routing of US 51.

In Oglesby in central LaSalle County, I-39 passes next to Starved Rock State Park, the busiest state park in Illinois. North of the park, it crosses the Illinois River over the Abraham Lincoln Memorial Bridge; at 1.3 miles (2.1 km) long, it is the longest bridge in the state. Just north of the river, I-39 passes between the cities of LaSalle and Peru; as it intersects I-80 and US 6, it makes its southernmost connections with the Chicago region. North of I-80, the wind turbines of the Mendota Hills Wind Farm (the first commercial wind farm in Illinois) can be seen from milepost 72 at Mendota north to near Paw Paw. As I-39 continues northward, I-39 also intersects US 52 and US 30.

In Ogle County, I-39 intersects with I-88 (IL 110), connecting I-39 to both Chicago and the Quad Cities regions. As it intersects IL 38, IL 64, and IL 72, I-39 connects with the DeKalb–Sycamore region and far west suburbs of the Chicago area.

As I-39 crosses into Winnebago County, the Baxter Road exit (exit 115) is the final exit before I-39 joins the US 20 freeway bypass in Rockford. Approximately a mile east of the Alpine Road/US 20 interchange, I-39 joins US 20, moving from nearly entirely farmland to medium-density populated areas.

After heading northeast for approximately four miles (6.4 km), US 20 splits from I-39/US 51; a mile northward, I-39/US 51 runs concurrently with I-90 (Jane Addams Memorial Tollway). Though signed as I-39/I-90, the concurrency follows the mileposts of I-90. Though I-39 itself is not tolled, the Illinois Tollway collects tolls on the I-90 portion, including two ramp interchanges and an open-road toll plaza between Rockton and South Beloit.

At exit 1 (IL 75) in South Beloit, US 51 splits from I-39 to join IL 75; two miles (3.2 km) westward, it continues the route of IL 251 into Wisconsin. For all but one mile that I-39 is in Illinois, it runs concurrently with US 51.

=== Wisconsin ===
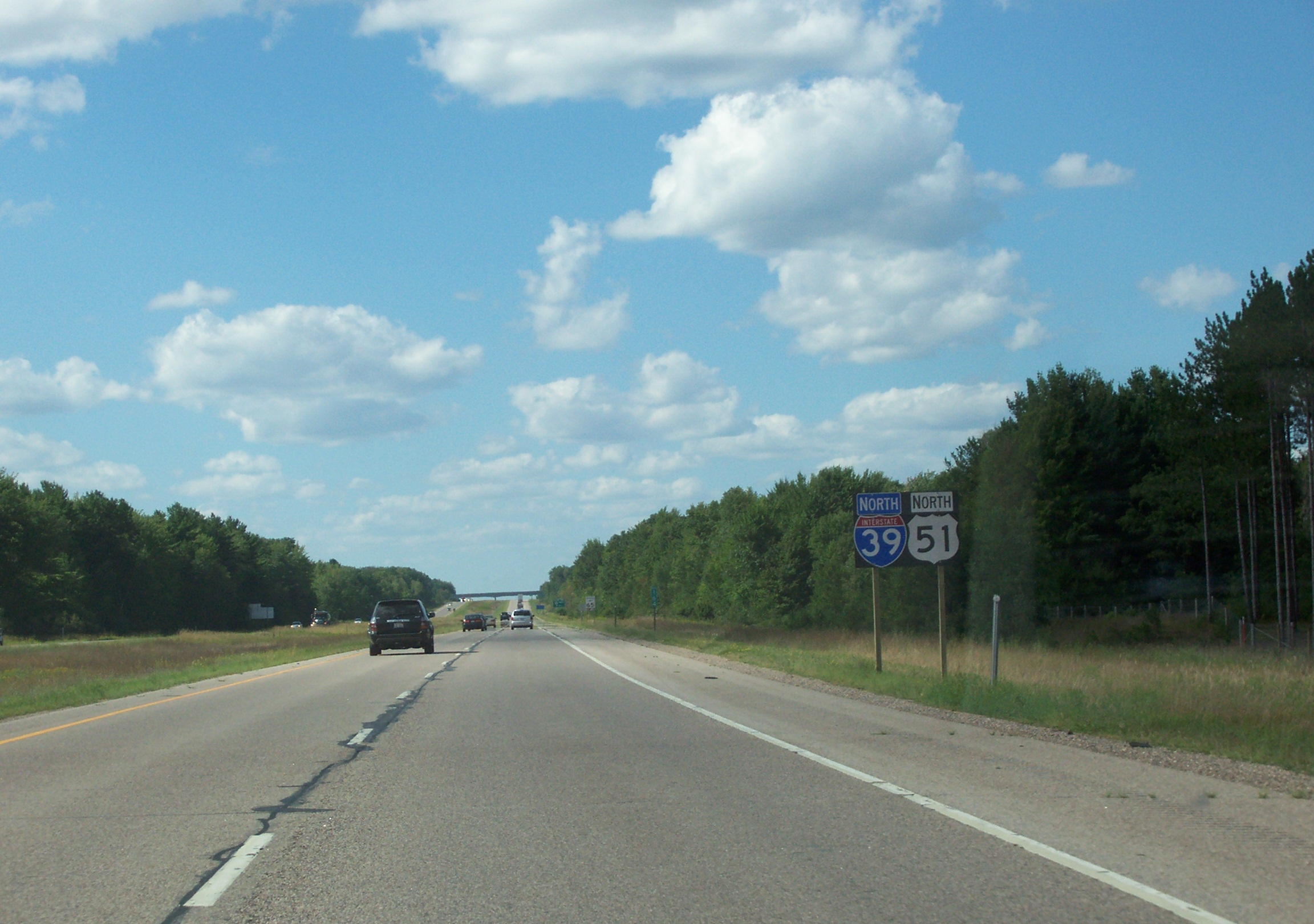
I-39/US 51 in northern Wisconsin

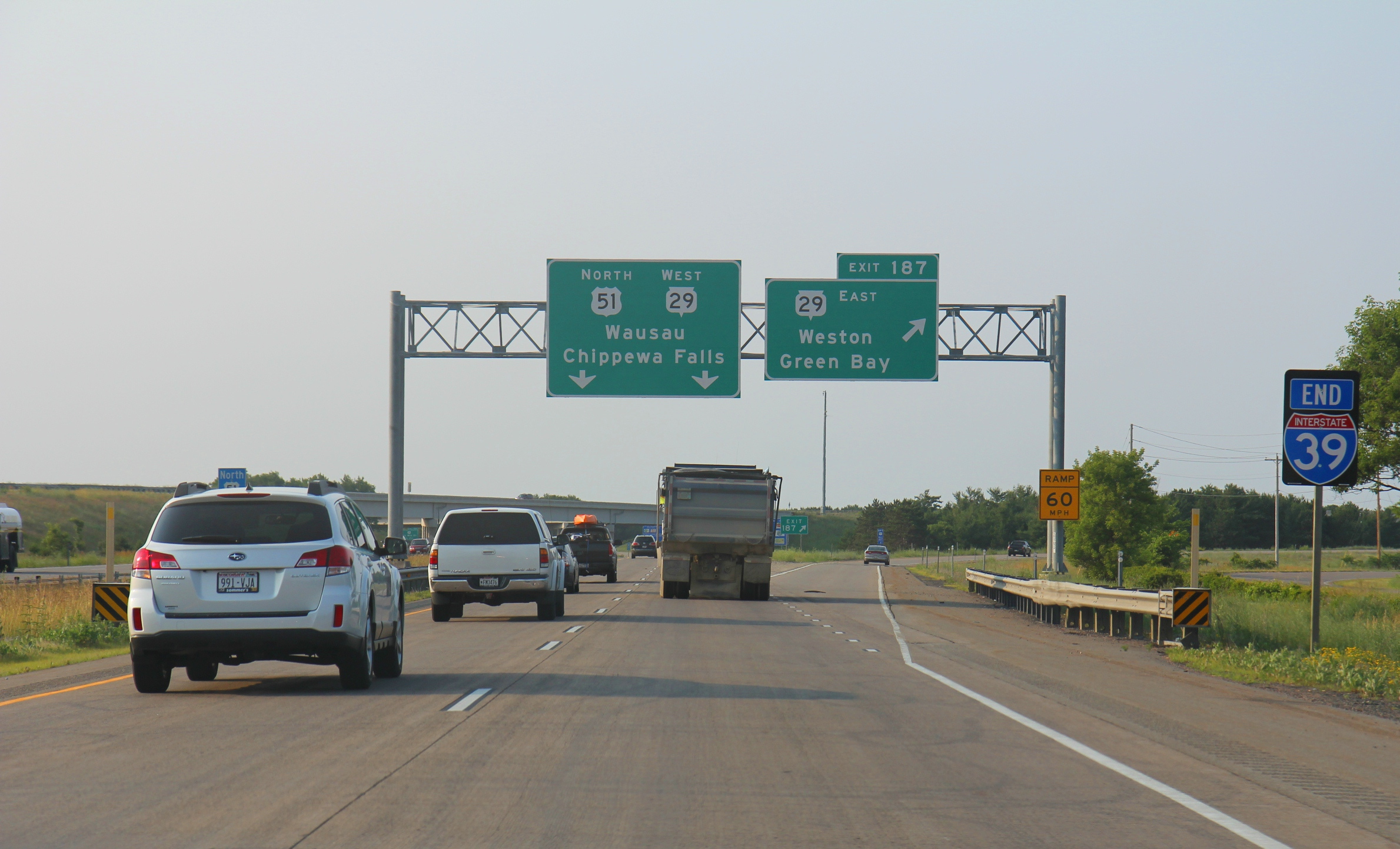
Northern terminus of I-39 at the interchange with WIS 29 near Wausau

I-39 enters Wisconsin in Rock County, concurrently with I-90. Bypassing Beloit to the east, it passes underneath the County Trunk Highway P bridge (CTH-P, Stateline Road). The tri-stack exit 185 provides access to Beloit through WIS 81 and serves as the southern terminus of I-43 (accessing Milwaukee and Green Bay). The northernmost interchange serving the Beloit region is CTH-S (Shopiere Road) at exit 183. About seven miles (11 km) north of the I-43 interchange, I-39/I-90 is joined by WIS 11 for two miles (3.2 km) as it bypasses Janesville. In addition to the northern interchange that holds WIS 11, Janesville is also accessed by US 14 and WIS 26 (Milton Avenue). After crossing the Rock River, I-39/I-90 has an interchange with WIS 59, connecting it with Edgerton (to the west) and Milton (to the southeast).

I-39 enters Dane County north of WIS 59, passing west of Lake Koshkonong. For approximately four miles (6.4 km), US 51 rejoins the Interstate (from mile 160 to 156) before it heads west through Stoughton. I-39/I-90 changes direction north of Utica, gradually turning northwest. At exit 142, the highway turns returns north as it meets US 12/US 18 in Madison, forming the eastern terminus of the Madison Beltline Highway; for approximately 650 feet (200 m), northbound I-39 is reduced to two lanes (for the first time since Cherry Valley, Illinois). North of the Beltline, I-39 accesses Madison through an interchange with WIS 30 and I-94 (routed from Milwaukee); the interchange is known as the Badger Interchange. Two miles (3.2 km) further north, the highway has an interchange with US 151 (splitting Madison and Sun Prairie); the northernmost Madison-area I-39 interchanges are US 51 (Madison and DeForest) and WIS 19 (Sun Prairie and Waunakee); CTH-V (West North Street) for DeForest serves as the last Dane County exit.

I-39/I-90/I-94 enters Columbia County four miles (6.4 km) north-northwest of CTH-V. From the county line northward, the highway returns to rural surroundings. Three miles (4.8 km) after crossing the Wisconsin River, exit 108 (Wisconsin Dells) splits I-90/I-94 from I-39. For the first time since the US 20 Bypass in Rockford–Cherry Valley, I-39 is four lanes instead of six or eight. I-39 continues northward from WIS 78 (which terminates at the interchange), routed towards Portage. I-39 connects with Portage through WIS 33, crosses the Wisconsin River a second time, connects with WIS 16; a third interchange rejoins I-39 with US 51. I-39 takes on the mileposts of the latter.

After taking on US 51, I-39 continues northward, with few directional changes through Marquette County and Waushara County. In Portage County, the highway continues its northward direction until it reaches the Stevens Point region, where it bypasses the city to the east and north; four interchanges connect with the city (CTH-HH, US 10/WIS 66, Stanley Street, and Bus. US 51).

From Stevens Point northward, I-39 largely parallels the path of the Wisconsin River and Lake DuBay. Following its entrance into Marathon County, WIS 153 connects to I-39 in Mosinee, adjacent to the Central Wisconsin Airport. The final north-south interchange of I-39 is exit 185 (Bus. US 51) in Rothschild, just before I-39 crosses the Wisconsin River.

I-39 ends with exit 187, as WIS 29 merges with US 51 (for approximately four miles [6.4 km]); the latter highway continues north to its terminus at US 2 at the Wisconsin–Michigan border.

== History ==
=== Illinois ===
When the Interstate Highway System was first being planned, Illinois made a request for a north–south highway from South Beloit to Salem. The project was deemed a low priority and was shelved. US 51, which ran mostly down the middle of the state, became a heavily traveled two-lane arterial road, experiencing many crashes and earning the nickname "Killer 51".

In the late 1960s and early 1970s, a major supplemental freeway system plan was proposed, with the goal of providing Illinois residents access to freeways within 30 minutes or less. One of the proposed routes, FAP 412, was a route that would extend from US 20 in Rockford to I-57 just north of Salem, similar to the earlier requested route. Due to traffic counts, only the portion between Rockford and Decatur was prioritized.

Over the course of the 1970s, planning for the US 51 supplemental freeway took place in earnest. However, debate ensued over what type of highway should be built. The Illinois Department of Transportation (IDOT) wanted the entire highway built to Interstate Highway standards, but a transportation committee established to review the proposed supplemental freeway system recommended only Interstate construction between Rockford and I-80. The highway from Oglesby south to Decatur was recommended to be an at-grade expressway, utilizing the existing road where possible. After a decade of lobbying by interest groups, it was announced in 1986 that US 51 would be rebuilt to Interstate standards from Oglesby to Normal. However, due to funding concerns and local opposition, it was decided that the Bloomington to Decatur segment would not be built to Interstate standards; this segment was made a four-lane expressway.

The first segment of the freeway opened 1984 from IL 5 (now I-88) in Rochelle, to US 20 in Rockford. When the freeway was completed south from IL 5 to I-80 in 1986, IDOT officially requested an Interstate designation for the new highway, and I-39 was officially designated. By December 1987, construction on the section of I-39 between I-80 and IL 251 was finished. The next section, between IL 251 and I-55 in Bloomington–Normal, was completed by 1992, although this stretch of the highway was opened in several phases as completed. In December 1989, the section from Bloomington–Normal to Hudson opened, a distance of about 4.4 miles (7.1 km). In early September 1992, another segment opened from IL 116 north to IL 17.

=== Wisconsin ===
In Wisconsin, the highway was officially designated in 1992. In October 1993, the American Association of State Highway and Transportation Officials (AASHTO) established part of I-39 in its northern section between Rockford and Rib Mountain, Wisconsin, then designated I-39 along existing portions of I-90, I-94, and US 51. However, this part of the highway was not marked as I-39 for another four years, primarily because the Wisconsin Department of Transportation (WisDOT) had to reconstruct the interchange connecting I-90 and I-94 with WIS 78 near Portage. Signs denoting I-39 were placed along the highway in Wisconsin until 1996, when the section between Portage and Rib Mountain (near Wausau) received its signs. This occurred after then–Governor Tommy Thompson designated the stretch between Portage and Wausau in 1996 after a five-year push to get the Interstate designation approved. The remaining segment along I-90/I-94 was not signed for I-39 until late 1998. The section between the I-90/I-94 interchange and US 51's interchange in Portage was previously a part of WIS 78. That route was truncated back to its current terminus when the Interstate's designation went into effect. The designation of I-39 violated Wisconsin's rule of not having any state trunk highway number duplicated—Interstate, US, or state—as WIS 39 already existed.

In the 2020s, the entire I-39 corridor was designated as an Alternative Fuel Corridor for electric vehicles.

== Exit list ==
| State | County | Location | mi | km | Exit | Destinations | Notes |
|---|---|---|---|---|---|---|---|
| Illinois | McLean | Normal | 0.00 | 0.00 | — | I-55 / US 51 south to I-74 – Chicago, St. Louis, Decatur, Peoria, Champaign | Southern terminus of I-39; southern end of US 51 concurrency; I-55 exit 164; Central Illinois Regional Airport |
| Illinois | McLean | Normal | 1.53 | 2.46 | 2 | US 51 Bus. south (Main Street) – Bloomington, Normal | |
| Illinois | McLean | Hudson | 4.67 | 7.52 | 5 | CR 12 (Franklin Street) – Hudson | |
| Illinois | McLean | Hudson Township | 7.75 | 12.47 | 8 | IL 251 north / CR 8 (Lake Bloomington Road) – Kappa | Southern terminus of IL 251 |
| Illinois | Woodford | El Paso | 14.35 | 23.09 | 14 | US 24 – Peoria, El Paso | |
| Illinois | Woodford | Woodford | 22.37 | 36.00 | 22 | IL 116 – Peoria, Pontiac | |
| Illinois | Woodford | Minonk | 26.94 | 43.36 | 27 | CR 2 – Minonk | |
| Illinois | Marshall | Wenona | 35.02 | 56.36 | 35 | IL 17 – Lacon, Wenona | |
| Illinois | LaSalle | Lostant | 41.60 | 66.95 | 41 | IL 18 – Henry, Streator | |
| Illinois | LaSalle | Tonica | 48.67 | 78.33 | 48 | CR 54 (Reed Richardson Road) – Tonica | |
| Illinois | LaSalle | Eden Township | 51.70 | 83.20 | 51 | IL 71 – Hennepin, Oglesby, Granville | |
| Illinois | LaSalle | Eden Township | 52.47 | 84.44 | 52 | IL 251 – Peru, LaSalle | |
| Illinois | LaSalle | Oglesby | 53.79 | 86.57 | 54 | Walnut Street – Oglesby | |
| Illinois | LaSalle | Illinois River | | | Abraham Lincoln Memorial Bridge | | |
| Illinois | LaSalle | La Salle | 56.75 | 91.33 | 57 | US 6 (5th Street) – LaSalle, Peru, Ottawa | |
| Illinois | LaSalle | La Salle | 58.68– 59.46 | 94.44– 95.69 | 59 | I-80 – Chicago, Des Moines, LaSalle, Peru | Signed as exits 59A (east) and 59B (west); I-80 exit 79 |
| Illinois | LaSalle | Troy Grove | 66.16 | 106.47 | 66 | US 52 – Troy Grove | |
| Illinois | LaSalle | Mendota | 72.09 | 116.02 | 72 | US 34 – Mendota, Earlville | |
| Illinois | Lee | Paw Paw | 82.57 | 132.88 | 82 | CR 10 (Chicago Road) – Paw Paw | |
| Illinois | Lee | Willow Creek Township | 87.34 | 140.56 | 87 | US 30 – Sterling, Rock Falls, Aurora | |
| Illinois | Lee | Steward | 93.34 | 150.22 | 93 | CR 2 (Perry Road) – Steward | |
| Illinois | Ogle | Rochelle | 97.10– 97.79 | 156.27– 157.38 | 97 | I-88 Toll / IL 110 (CKC) (Ronald Reagan Memorial Tollway) – Moline, Rock Island, Chicago | Signed as exits 97A (east) and 97B (west); I-88 exit 78 |
| Illinois | Ogle | Rochelle | 99.46 | 160.07 | 99 | IL 38 / Lincoln Highway – DeKalb, Rochelle | |
| Illinois | Ogle | Lynnville Township | 104.50 | 168.18 | 104 | IL 64 – Sycamore, Oregon | |
| Illinois | Ogle | Monroe Center | 110.98 | 178.60 | 111 | IL 72 – Genoa, Byron, Kingston | |
| Illinois | Winnebago | Rockford Township | 115.49 | 185.86 | 115 | CR 11 (Baxter Road) | |
| Illinois | Winnebago | Rockford | 119.05– 119.56 | 191.59– 192.41 | 118-119 | US 20 west (Rockford Bypass) – Freeport | Southern end of US 20 concurrency; Chicago Rockford International Airport |
| Illinois | Winnebago | Cherry Valley | 122.17 | 196.61 | 121 | US 20 east (Harrison Avenue) – Belvidere | Northern end of US 20 concurrency; former cloverleaf interchange converted to diverging diamond interchange |
| Illinois | Winnebago | Cherry Valley | 122.90 | 197.79 | 122 | I-90 Toll east (Jane Addams Memorial Tollway) – Chicago | Southern end of I-90 concurrency; I-90 exit 17; I-39 uses I-90's exit numbers from here north |
| Illinois | Winnebago | Rockford | 124.45 | 200.28 | 15 | US 20 Bus. (State Street) – Rockford, Belvidere | Last free exit northbound |
| Illinois | Winnebago | Rockford | 127.77 | 205.63 | 12 | CR 55 west (East Riverside Boulevard) – Loves Park | Toll on northbound exit and southbound entrance |
| Illinois | Winnebago | Machesney Park | 131.31 | 211.32 | 8 | IL 173 (West Lane Road) – Machesney Park | Toll on northbound exit and southbound entrance |
| Illinois | Winnebago | Rockton | 136.71 | 220.01 | South Beloit Toll Plaza 1 | | |
| Illinois | Winnebago | South Beloit | 137.53 | 221.33 | 3 | CR 9 (Rockton Road) – Rockton, Roscoe | Last free exit southbound; northwestern end of Jane Addams Memorial Tollway |
| Illinois | Winnebago | South Beloit | 139.93 | 225.20 | 1 | US 51 north / IL 75 – South Beloit | Northern end of US 51 concurrency |
| | | | 140.25 0.00 | 225.71 0.00 | Illinois–Wisconsin state line | | |
| Wisconsin | Rock | Town of Turtle | 2.48 | 3.99 | 185B | I-43 north – Milwaukee | I-43 exits 0A-B southbound; former cloverleaf interchange; undergoing conversion to tri-stack interchange. |
| Wisconsin | Rock | Town of Turtle | 2.46 | 3.96 | 185A | WIS 81 west (Milwaukee Avenue) – Beloit | Former cloverleaf interchange; undergoing conversion to diverging diamond interchange for access to/from 43 via County route X. |
| Wisconsin | Rock | Town of Turtle | 4.78 | 7.69 | 183 | CTH-S (Shopiere Road) – Beloit, Shopiere | |
| Wisconsin | Rock | Town of La Prairie | 9.95 | 16.01 | 177 | WIS 11 west (Avalon Road) – Janesville, Avalon | Southern end of WIS 11 concurrency; Southern Wisconsin Regional Airport |
| Wisconsin | Rock | Janesville | 12.49 | 20.10 | 175 | Alt. I-39 north / Alt. I-43 north (Racine Street) / WIS 11 east – Delavan | Northern end of WIS 11 concurrency; former Bus. US 14 |
| Wisconsin | Rock | Janesville | 15.61– 15.66 | 25.12– 25.20 | 171B | Alt. I-39 south / US 14 – Janesville, Delavan | Formerly split into exits 171B (west) and 171C (east) |
| Wisconsin | Rock | Janesville | 16.41 | 26.41 | 171A | WIS 26 – Milton, Janesville | |
| Wisconsin | Rock | Town of Fulton | 24.62 | 39.62 | 163 | WIS 59 – Edgerton, Milton, Whitewater | |
| Wisconsin | Dane | Town of Albion | 27.60 | 44.42 | 160 | US 51 south / WIS 73 / WIS 106 – Edgerton, Deerfield | Southern end of US 51 concurrency |
| Wisconsin | Dane | Town of Christiana | 31.30 | 50.37 | 156 | US 51 north – Stoughton | Northern end of US 51 concurrency |
| Wisconsin | Dane | Town of Pleasant Springs | 40.40 | 65.02 | 147 | CTH-N – Stoughton, Cottage Grove | |
| Wisconsin | Dane | Town of Blooming Grove | 45.54 | 73.29 | 142 | US 12 / US 18 (Beltline Highway) – Madison, Cambridge | Signed as exits 142A (west) and 142B (east); US 12 exit 267 |
| Wisconsin | Dane | Madison | 49.39 | 79.49 | 138B | WIS 30 west – Madison | Left exit and entrance northbound; serves Dane County Airport; WIS 30 exit 3 eastbound and exit 240A westbound |
| Wisconsin | Dane | Madison | 49.74 | 80.05 | 138A | I-94 east – Milwaukee | Left exit and entrance southbound; southern end of I-94 concurrency; I-94 exit 240 |
| Wisconsin | Dane | Madison | 51.74 | 83.27 | 135C | High Crossing Boulevard | Northbound exit and southbound entrance |
| Wisconsin | Dane | Madison | 51.96– 52.00 | 83.62– 83.69 | 135B | US 151 north – Sun Prairie | Cloverleaf interchange |
| Wisconsin | Dane | Madison | 51.96– 52.00 | 83.62– 83.69 | 135A | US 151 south – Madison | Cloverleaf interchange |
| Wisconsin | Dane | Town of Burke | 55.20 | 88.84 | 132 | US 51 (Stoughton Road) – Madison, De Forest | |
| Wisconsin | Dane | Community of Windsor | 56.68 | 91.22 | 131 | WIS 19 – Waunakee, Sun Prairie | |
| Wisconsin | Dane | Town of Vienna | 60.93 | 98.06 | 126 | CTH-V – Dane, De Forest | |
| Wisconsin | Columbia | Town of Arlington | 67.97 | 109.39 | 119 | WIS 60 – Lodi, Arlington, Columbus | |
| Wisconsin | Columbia | Town of Dekorra | 71.99 | 115.86 | 115 | CTH-CS / CTH-J – Poynette, Lake Wisconsin | |
| Wisconsin | Columbia | Town of Caledonia | 78.63 | 126.54 | — | I-90 west / I-94 west – Wisconsin Dells | Northern end of I-90/I-94 concurrency; I-90 exit 108B |
| Wisconsin | Columbia | Town of Caledonia | 79.26 | 127.56 | 84 | WIS 78 south – Merrimac | Signed as exit 108A northbound |
| Wisconsin | Columbia | Town of Caledonia | 79.73 | 128.31 | 85 | Cascade Mountain Road | |
| Wisconsin | Columbia | Portage | 81.73 | 131.53 | 87 | WIS 33 (Cook Street) – Portage, Baraboo | |
| Wisconsin | Columbia | Portage | 84.13 | 135.39 | 89 | WIS 16 (Wisconsin Street) to WIS 127 – Portage, Wisconsin Dells, Columbus | Signed as exits 89A (east) and 89B (west) northbound |
| Wisconsin | Columbia | Town of Fort Winnebago | 85.79 | 138.07 | 92 | US 51 south (New Pinery Road) – Portage | Southern end of US 51 concurrency; exit numbers from here north based on US 51's mileposts |
| Wisconsin | Marquette | Town of Moundville | 94.43 | 151.97 | 100 | WIS 23 west / CTH-P – Wisconsin Dells, Endeavor | Southern end of WIS 23 concurrency |
| Wisconsin | Marquette | Town of Oxford | 98.61 | 158.70 | 104 | CTH-D – Packwaukee | Northbound exit and southbound entrance |
| Wisconsin | Marquette | Town of Oxford | 100.77 | 162.17 | 106 | WIS 23 east / WIS 82 west – Oxford, Montello, Princeton, Packwaukee | Northern end of WIS 23 concurrency |
| Wisconsin | Marquette | Westfield | 107.32 | 172.71 | 113 | CTH-E / CTH-J – Westfield, Harrisville, Princeton | |
| Wisconsin | Waushara | Coloma | 118.29 | 190.37 | 124 | WIS 21 – Coloma, Necedah, Wautoma, Oshkosh, Tomah | |
| Wisconsin | Waushara | Town of Hancock | 125.35 | 201.73 | 131 | CTH-V – Hancock | |
| Wisconsin | Waushara | Town of Plainfield | 130.94 | 210.73 | 136 | WIS 73 – Plainfield, Wisconsin Rapids, Wautoma, Nekoosa | |
| Wisconsin | Portage | Town of Pine Grove | 134.07 | 215.76 | 139 | CTH-D – Almond | |
| Wisconsin | Portage | Town of Pine Grove | 137.56 | 221.38 | 143 | CTH-W – Bancroft, Wisconsin Rapids | |
| Wisconsin | Portage | Town of Plover | 145.91 | 234.82 | 151 | WIS 54 (Post Road) / Bus. US 51 – Wisconsin Rapids, Plover, Waupaca | |
| Wisconsin | Portage | Village of Plover | 147.51 | 237.39 | 153 | CTH-B (Plover Road) – Wisconsin Rapids, Plover, Amherst | |
| Wisconsin | Portage | Village of Plover | 150.53 | 242.25 | 156 | CTH-HH (McDill Avenue) – Whiting, Stevens Point | |
| Wisconsin | Portage | Stevens Point | 152.71 | 245.76 | 158 | US 10 east / WIS 66 west (Main Street) – Stevens Point, Waupaca, Appleton, Marshfield | Southern end of US 10 concurrency; southern end of WI 66 concurrency; signed as exits 158A (east) and 158B (west) northbound |
| Wisconsin | Portage | Stevens Point | 153.94 | 247.74 | 159 | WIS 66 east (Stanley Street) – Stevens Point, Rosholt | Northern end of WI 66 concurrency |
| Wisconsin | Portage | Stevens Point | 155.76 | 250.67 | 161 | Bus. US 51 (Division Street) – Stevens Point | |
| Wisconsin | Portage | Hull | 157.63 | 253.68 | 163 | Casimir Road | To CTH-X |
| Wisconsin | Portage | Hull | 159.75 | 257.09 | 165 | US 10 west – Marshfield | Northern end of US 10 concurrency |
| Wisconsin | Portage | Hull | 159.75 | 257.09 | 165 | CTH-X | Former diamond interchange; removed for construction of US 10 exit |
| Wisconsin | Portage | Town of Dewey | 165.39 | 266.17 | 171 | CTH-DB – Knowlton, Lake DuBay | |
| Wisconsin | Marathon | Town of Knowlton | 169.64 | 273.01 | 175 | WIS 34 (Balsam Road) – Knowlton, Wisconsin Rapids | |
| Wisconsin | Marathon | Mosinee | 173.57 | 279.33 | 179 | WIS 153 – Mosinee, Elderon | Central Wisconsin Airport |
| Wisconsin | Marathon | Kronenwetter | 175.39 | 282.26 | 181 | Maple Ridge Road | |
| Wisconsin | Marathon | Rothschild | 179.52 | 288.91 | 185 | Bus. US 51 – Rothschild, Kronenwetter | |
| Wisconsin | Marathon | Village of Rib Mountain | 182.14 | 293.13 | 187 | WIS 29 east – Weston, Green Bay US 51 north / WIS 29 west – Wausau, Chippewa Falls | Northern terminus; northern end of US 51 concurrency; freeway continues as US 51/WIS 29 |
1.000 mi = 1.609 km; 1.000 km = 0.621 mi: Closed/former; Concurrency terminus; Electronic toll collection; Incomplete access
