= U.S. Route 10 in Wisconsin =

Segment of U.S. Highway in Wisconsin

U.S. Highway 10
- Vietnam War Veterans Memorial Highway
- US 10 highlighted in red

Route information
- Maintained by WisDOT
- Length: 294.01 mi (473.16 km)
- Existed: November 11, 1926–present

Major junctions
- West end: US 10 in Prescott
- US 63 in Ellsworth; US 53 in Osseo; I-94 in Osseo; US 12 / WIS 27 in Fairchild; I-39 / US 51 / WIS 66 in Stevens Point; US 45 in Larsen; I-41 / US 41 / WIS 441 in Fox Crossing; I-43 in Manitowoc; WIS 42 / LMCT in Manitowoc
- East end: SS Badger in Manitowoc

Location
- Country: United States
- State: Wisconsin
- Counties: Pierce, Pepin, Buffalo, Trempealeau, Jackson, Eau Claire, Clark, Wood, Portage, Waupaca, Winnebago, Calumet, Manitowoc

Highway system
- United States Numbered Highway System; List; Special; Divided; Wisconsin State Trunk Highway System; Interstate; US; State; Scenic; Rustic
← US 8	→ WIS 10
← US 18	WIS 18	→ WIS 19

U.S. Highway 10 (US 10) in Wisconsin runs east–west across the central part of the state. It runs from the Prescott Drawbridge over the St. Croix River at Prescott east to the dock in Manitowoc where SS Badger crosses Lake Michigan to Ludington, Michigan. The highway is also designated as the Vietnam War Veterans Memorial Highway for its entire length.

== Route description ==
US 10 enters the state and Pierce County from Minnesota at Prescott and immediately joins with Wisconsin Highway 35 (WIS 35) north. WIS 35 turns north one mile (1.6 km) northeast at WIS 29 while US 10 continues east and passes through Ellsworth at the junctions with WIS 65 and US 63. The highway turns southeast and passes through Ono and Plum City. US 10 then enters Pepin County and junctions with WIS 25 and WIS 85 at Durand. US 10 briefly enters Buffalo County and passes through Mondovi at the junction with WIS 37. In northern Trempealeau County, the highway crosses WIS 93 at Eleva, passes through Strum, and junctions with US 53 and I-94 in Osseo. The route then enters Jackson County where it joins US 12 and WIS 27. US 12 and WIS 27 split to the south at the Clark County line while US 10 continues east to Neillsville and crosses WIS 73 there. The highway then meanders northeast into Wood County, intersecting with WIS 80. It then becomes an expressway and passes south of Marshfield, meeting WIS 13 one mile (1.6 km) south of the city at a diamond interchange. US 10 then passes south of Auburndale and enters Portage County near Milladore.

US 10 enters Portage County as a freeway, and meets WIS 34 and WIS 13 south two miles (3.2 km) west of Junction City. WIS 34 splits to the north two miles (3.2 km) east of Junction City while US 10 turns east and bypasses Stevens Point. The highway then meets I-39/US 51 north of the city and runs concurrently with I-39/US 51 for about seven miles (11 km) before exiting to the east of Stevens Point. At this point, US 10 becomes a multilane surface road for about six miles (9.7 km), then becomes an expressway and heads southeast, passing through Amherst and crossing into Waupaca County. US 10 bypasses the city of Waupaca to the south, junctions with WIS 22 and WIS 54, and meets WIS 49 south. US 10 and WIS 49 turn eastward to Weyauwega then head south to Fremont where WIS 49 turns south and US 10 becomes a freeway at the junction with WIS 110. US 10 collects US 45 south in northwest Winnebago County for a three-mile (4.8 km) southeast trek before US 45 splits to the south and US 10 turns east to rendezvous with WIS 441 at the junction with I-41/US 41 in Neenah. US 10 turns south off the WIS 441 freeway south of Appleton and turns east into Calumet County.

As a multilane urban arterial, US 10 collects WIS 114 for four miles (6.4 km) before the latter splits southward two miles (3.2 km) before US 10 junctions with WIS 55. The highway then crosses WIS 32 and WIS 57 at Forest Junction and turns southeast to pass through Brillion and into Manitowoc County. The highway passes through Reedsville and Whitelaw before turning south onto I-43 for three miles (4.8 km) and turning east off the Interstate to head along WIS 42 into the north side of Manitowoc. US 10 then turns south into downtown where it continues into Michigan via the SS Badger car ferry to Ludington. Badger only operates on a seasonal basis from May to October.

== History ==
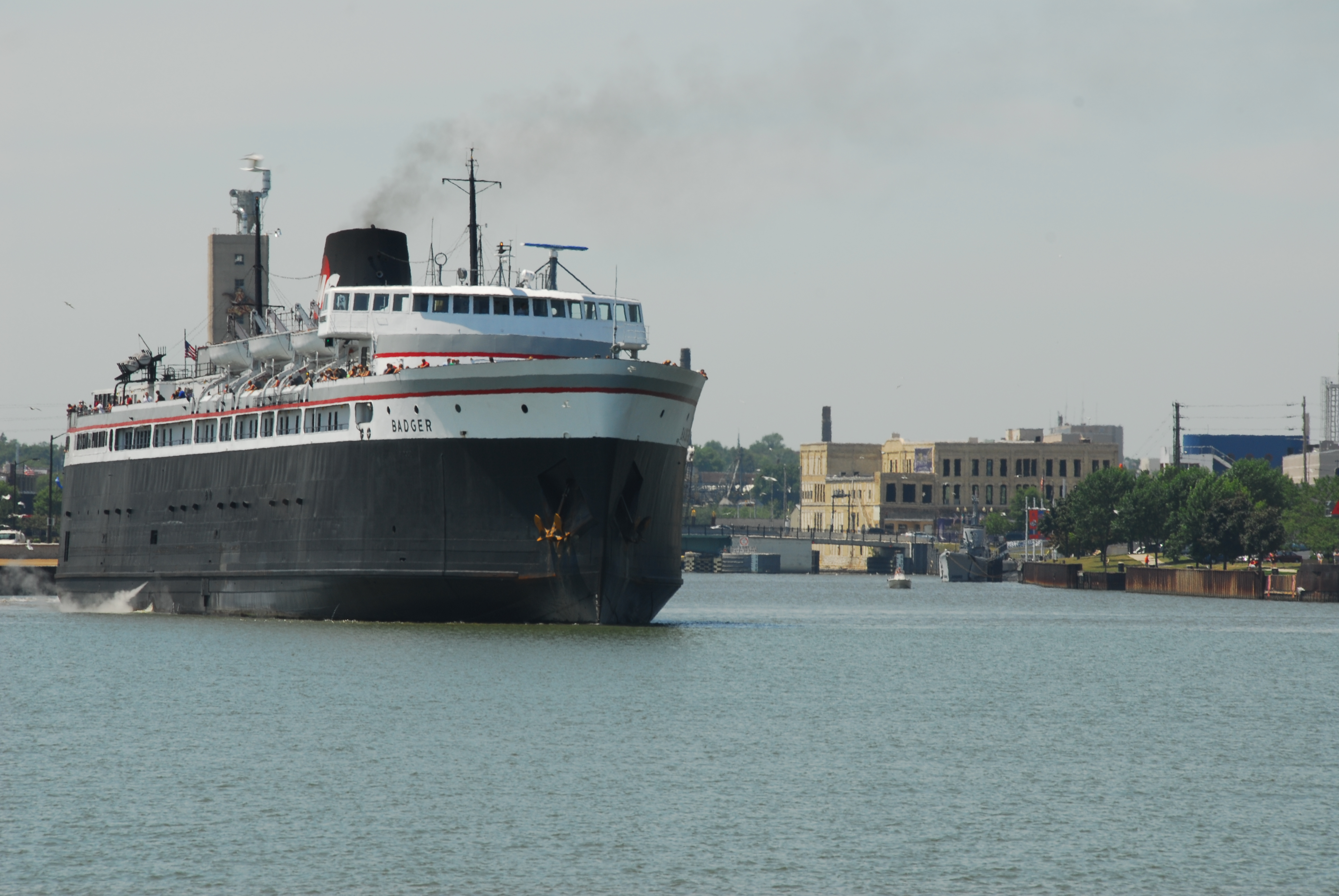
SS Badger transports across Lake Michigan

Before 1926, what is now US 10 was State Trunk Highway 18. But WIS 18 initially (in 1917) ran only from Humbird, near where US 10 and US 12 (then WIS 12) cross, east to Manitowoc. State Trunk Highway 34 ran from Prescott to WIS 37 in Mondovi. The route between Mondovi and Humbird was not numbered until the early 1920s, when WIS 18 was extended west from Humbird past Mondovi to Prescott, eliminating WIS 34.

When US 10 was designated in 1926, it ran along US 12 from Minnesota east to Humbird, splitting there to run to Manitowoc. The part of former WIS 18 west of Humbird became WIS 34, as the number 18 conflicted with US 18. In 1934, WIS 34 disappeared again, as US 10 was separated from the US 12 concurrency to run along it.

At its spring 2015 meeting, the American Association of State Highway and Transportation Officials committee extended US 10 to include the route of SS Badger between Ludington and Manitowoc.

== Major intersections ==
County	Location	mi	km	Exit	Destinations	Notes
St. Croix River		0.000	0.000		US 10 west / I-94 Alt. west / Great River Road north – Hastings	Continuation into Minnesota
St. Croix River		0.000	0.000		Prescott Drawbridge; Wisconsin–Minnesota line	
Pierce	Prescott	0.09	0.14		WIS 35 / Great River Road south – Diamond Bluff, Hager City	Eastern end of GRR concurrency; western end of WIS 35 concurrency
Pierce	Prescott	1.32	2.12		WIS 29 east / WIS 35 north / Alt. I-94 east – River Falls	Western terminus of WIS 29; eastern end of WIS 35 and Alternate I-94 concurrency
Pierce	Oak Grove	9.12	14.68		CTH-E	
Pierce	Trimbelle	12.16	19.57		CTH-O	
Pierce	Trimbelle	13.71	22.06		CTH-J	
Pierce	Trimbelle	15.56	25.04		US 63 south – Red Wing	Western end of US 63 concurrency
Pierce	Ellsworth	17.16	27.62		WIS 65 north – River Falls	
Pierce	Ellsworth	18.84	30.32		US 63 north / WIS 72 east – Baldwin	Eastern end of US 63 concurrency
Pierce	Bay City	22.87	36.81		CTH-D	
Pierce	Ono	33.51	53.93		CTH-CC	
Pierce	Plum City	37.24	59.93		CTH-U	
Pepin	Arkansaw	47.19	75.94		WIS 25 north – Menomonie	Western end of WIS 25 concurrency
Pepin	Durand	48.16	77.51		WIS 25 south – Nelson	Eastern end of WIS 25 concurrency
Pepin	Durand	49.66	79.92		WIS 85 east – Eau Claire	
Buffalo	Mondovi	64.82	104.32		WIS 37 north – Eau Claire	Western end of WIS 37 concurrency
Buffalo	Mondovi	65.54	105.48		WIS 37 south – Alma	Eastern end of WIS 37 concurrency
Trempealeau	Eleva	74.89	120.52		WIS 93 – Eau Claire, Independence, Arcadia	
Trempealeau	Osseo	85.18	137.08		US 53 north / Alt. I-94 west – Eau Claire	Western end of US 53 and Alternate I-94 concurrency
Trempealeau	Osseo	87.60	140.98		US 53 south – Whitehall	Eastern end of concurrency
Trempealeau	Osseo	88.52	142.46		I-94 – St. Paul, Madison	I-94 exit 88, eastern end of Alternate I-94
Jackson	Fairchild	101.39	163.17		US 12 west / WIS 27 north – Augusta	Western end of US 12 and WI 27 concurrency
Clark	Mentor	103.28	166.21		US 12 east / WIS 27 south – Merrillan, Black River Falls	Eastern end of US 12 and WI 27 concurrency
Clark	Pine Valley	117.38	188.90		Bus. US 10 / CTH-B	
Clark	Neillsville	120.13	193.33		WIS 73 / WIS 95 – Withee, Pittsville	Northern terminus of WI 95
Clark	Granton	127.41	205.05		CTH-K south	Western end of CTH-K concurrency
Clark	Granton	128.54	206.87		CTH-K north	Eastern end of CTH-K concurrency
Wood	Marshfield	142.99	230.12		WIS 80 south / Klondike Drive – Pittsville	Roundabout
Wood	Marshfield	146.95	236.49	187	WIS 13 north / CTH-A – Marshfield	Interchange; western end of WIS 13 concurrency
Wood	Hewitt	148.90	239.63		CTH-T	
Wood	Auburndale	152.41	245.28		WIS 186 south / CTH-P – Auburndale, Arpin, Vesper	CTH-P is former WIS 186 north
Wood	Blenker	155.72	250.61		CTH-F	
Wood	Milladore	160.72	258.65		CTH-S	
Portage	Junction City	163.62	263.32	204	WIS 13 / WIS 34 south – Junction City, Wisconsin Rapids, Rudolph	West end of freeway; western end of WIS 34 concurrency; eastern end of WIS 13 concurrency
Portage	Junction City	168.04	270.43	208	WIS 34 north / CTH-HH to CTH-P – Knowlton, Stevens Point, Junction City	Eastern end of WIS 34 concurrency; CTH-P is former US 10
Portage	Hull	172.90	278.26	213	I-39 / US 51 north – Wausau	Left entrance eastbound, left exits; western end of I-39/US 51 concurrency; no exit number westbound; I-39 exit 165
Portage	Hull	175.69	282.75	163	Casimir Road	Exit numbers follow I-39
Portage	Stevens Point	177.56	285.76	161	Bus. US 51 – Stevens Point	
Portage	Stevens Point	178.06	286.56	159	WIS 66 east – Stevens Point, Rosholt	Northern end of WIS 66 concurrency
Portage	Stevens Point	179.94	289.59		I-39 / US 51 south / WIS 66 west (Main Street) – Stevens Point, Wisconsin Rapids, Portage	East end of freeway section; eastern end of I-39/US 51 concurrency; southern end of WI 66 concurrency; I-39 exit 158
Portage	Stockton	183.95	296.04	230	CTH-J north-south	Interchange
Portage	Custer	188.50	303.36		CTH-K north	Western end of CTH-K concurrency
Portage	Stockton	191.20	307.71		WIS 161 – Nelsonville, Iola	
Portage	Stockton	191.90	308.83		CTH-K south	Eastern end of CTH-K concurrency
Portage	Town of Amherst	190.94	307.29	237	Lake Drive – Amherst Junction	West end of freeway; eastbound exit and westbound entrance
Portage	Amherst	192.51	309.81	238	CTH-B west – Plover, Amherst	Western end of CTH-B concurrency
Portage	Amherst	194.51	313.03	240	CTH-B east / CTH-A – Amherst	Eastern end of CTH-B concurrency
Waupaca	Sheridan	200.89	323.30		CTH-Q	
Waupaca	Waupaca	204.69	329.42	250	WIS 49 north (Fulton Street east) / WIS 54 west (Fulton Street west) – Waupaca, Wisconsin Rapids	West end of freeway; western end of WIS 49/WIS 54 concurrency
Waupaca	Waupaca	205.97	331.48	252	WIS 22 south to CTH-K south – Waupaca, Wild Rose	Western end of WIS 22 concurrency
Waupaca	Waupaca	207.38	333.75	253	Churchill Street	
Waupaca	Waupaca	208.66	335.81	254	WIS 22 north / WIS 54 east / CTH-A / CTH-K north – Waupaca, New London	East end of freeway; eastern end of WIS 22/WIS 54 concurrency
Waupaca	Weyauwega	213.95	344.32	260A	WIS 110 north / CTH-X – Weyauwega	Interchange; western end of WIS 110 concurrency
Waupaca	Weyauwega	214.92	345.88	260B	CTH-F – Weyauwega	Interchange; westbound exit and eastbound entrance
Waupaca	Fremont	218.73	352.01	264	WIS 49 south (Desert Road) / WIS 110 south – Berlin, Fremont	West end of freeway; eastern end of WIS 49/WIS 110 concurrency
Waupaca	Fremont	221.77	356.90	267	WIS 96 east / WIS 110 north – Fremont CTH-II east	Western terminus of WIS 96; southern terminus of WIS 110
Winnebago	Winchester	228.02	366.96	273	US 45 north – New London	Western end of US 45 concurrency
Winnebago	Winchester	230.59	371.10	276	US 45 south – Oshkosh	Eastern end of US 45 concurrency
Winnebago	Clayton	238.10	383.18	284	WIS 76 – Oshkosh, Shiocton	Eastbound also signed To US 41 north
Winnebago	Fox Crossing	240.54	387.11	286	CTH-CB (Mayflower Road) – Appleton International Airport	
Winnebago	Fox Crossing	241.68	388.95	287	I-41 (US 41) – Milwaukee, Green Bay; WIS 441 (Tri-County Expressway) begins	Westbound exits split into exits 287A (north) and 287B (south); western end of WIS 441 concurrency; I-41 exits 134A-B; Interchange named Michael G. Ellis Memorial Interchange
Winnebago	Menasha	242.64	390.49	289A	CTH-P (Racine Street)	
Winnebago	Menasha	243.75	392.28	289B	CTH-AP (Midway Road)	
Winnebago	Menasha	244.91	394.14	290	WIS 47 (Appleton Road)	
Calumet	Waverly Beach	245.91	395.75		WIS 441 north (Tri-County Expressway east) / Oneida Street north – Green Bay	East end of freeway section; eastern end of WIS 441 concurrency; WIS 441 exit 291
Calumet	Waverly Beach	247.39	398.14		WIS 114 west – Menasha, Neenah	Western end of WIS 114 concurrency
Calumet	Highland Beach	250.88	403.75		WIS 114 east – Sherwood	Eastern end of WIS 114 concurrency
Calumet	Harrison	255.50	411.19		WIS 55 – Kaukauna, Sherwood	
Calumet	Forest Junction	261.90	421.49		WIS 32 / WIS 57 – Green Bay, Chilton	
Calumet	Brillion	267.23	430.06		CTH-PP	
Manitowoc	Reedsville	272.53	438.59		CTH-W	
Manitowoc	Cato	277.89	447.22		CTH-J	
Manitowoc	Whitelaw	279.91	450.47		CTH-S	
Manitowoc	Manitowoc Rapids	284.70	458.18		I-43 north / WIS 310 east – Green Bay, Two Rivers	Western end of I-43 concurrency; I-43 exit 154; western terminus of WIS 310
Manitowoc	Manitowoc Rapids	287.75	463.09		I-43 south / CTH-JJ – Milwaukee	Eastern end of I-43 concurrency; I-43 exit 152
Manitowoc	Manitowoc	291.10	468.48		11th Street north	Former US 10 eastbound / Bus. WIS 42 southbound
Manitowoc	Manitowoc	291.40	468.96		CTH-B (8th Street north) – Mishicot	Former US 10 westbound / Bus. WIS 42 northbound
Manitowoc	Manitowoc				WIS 42 north (Memorial Drive) / LMCT north – Two Rivers, Sturgeon Bay	Western end of WIS 42/LMCT concurrency
Manitowoc	Manitowoc				WIS 42 south / LMCT south to I-43	Eastern end of WIS 42/LMCT concurrency; former US 151
Lake Michigan					SS Badger	Carferry to Ludington, Michigan, connection to US 10 in Michigan
1.000 mi = 1.609 km; 1.000 km = 0.621 mi: Concurrency terminus; Incomplete access; Tolled

== Business route ==
Business U.S. Highway 10
- Location: Neillsville
- Length: 2.8 mi (4.5 km)
- Existed: 1994–present

Business U.S. Highway 10 (Bus. US 10) is a business route of US 10 that follows its former alignment through Neillsville.

== See also ==
- U.S. Route 110, a short and short-lived spur from Fremont to Oshkosh

U.S. Route 10
Previous state: Minnesota	Wisconsin	Next state: Michigan
