= Wisconsin Highway 34 =

State highway in Wisconsin, United States

State Trunk Highway 34
- WIS 34 highlighted in red

Route information
- Maintained by WisDOT
- Length: 29.57 mi (47.59 km)

Major junctions
- South end: WIS 13 / WIS 73 in Wis. Rapids
- US 10 / WIS 13 in Junction City
- North end: I-39 / US 51 in Knowlton

Location
- Country: United States
- State: Wisconsin
- Counties: Wood, Portage, Marathon

Highway system
- Wisconsin State Trunk Highway System; Interstate; US; State; Scenic; Rustic
← WIS 33	→ WIS 35

State Trunk Highway 34 (often called Highway 34, STH-34 or WIS 34) is a state highway in the U.S. state of Wisconsin. It runs north–south as a shortcut route in central Wisconsin connecting Wausau and Wisconsin Rapids. In 2012, WIS 13 was added as a concurrency between US Highway 10 (US 10) west of Junction City and WIS 34's southern terminus in Wisconsin Rapids. The highway ends at Interstate 39 (I-39) in Knowlton on the north end, and at WIS 13 in Wisconsin Rapids on the south end.

== Route description ==
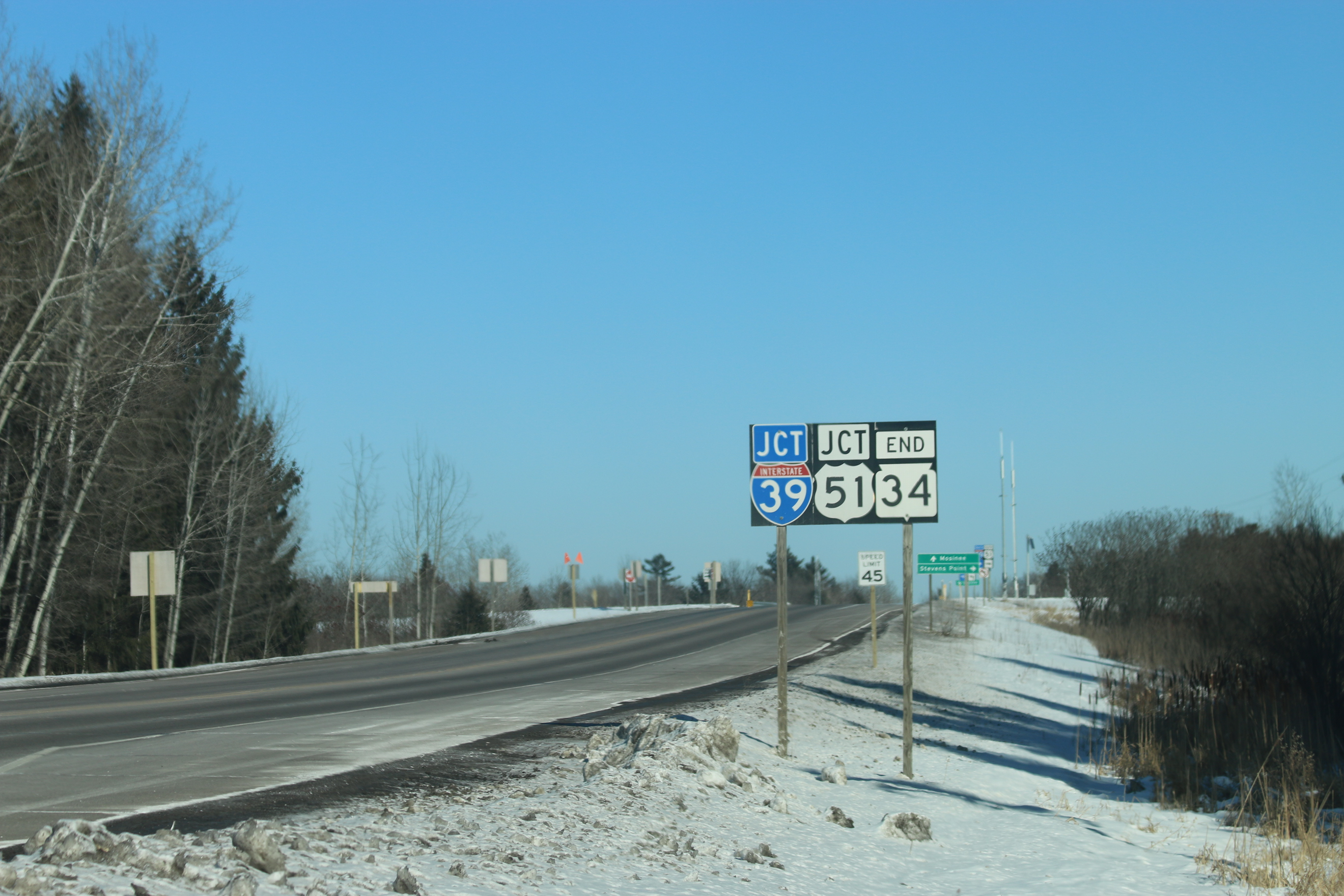
The northern terminus for WIS 34 at Knowlton, Wisconsin (I-39)

Starting at WIS 13/WIS 73 in Wisconsin Rapids, WIS 34 begins as a brief five-lane divided highway (three lanes northbound; two lanes southbound). Also, WIS 13 follows WIS 34 before reaching US 10. In the meantime, after crossing High Street at a four-way intersection, the road becomes a four-lane divided highway (two lanes in both directions). As both routes reach the city limit, the road downgrades into a two-lane undivided highway. Then, both reach WIS 66 at a three-way intersection. Just west of Junction City, they meet US 10 at a diamond interchange. WIS 34 turns east while WIS 13 turns west on the US 10 expressway. At the next exit, WIS 34 turns back north at another diamond interchange. Continuing north, it crosses the Wisconsin River. After crossing the Wisconsin River, it curves east to meet I-39/US 51 at a diamond interchange. At that diamond interchange, WIS 34 ends there.

== History ==
Initially, WIS 34 traveled from WIS 45 in Ellsworth to WIS 37 in Mondovi roughly on present-day US 10. In 1920, WIS 34 extended west to Prescott. In 1924, WIS 34 moved to a new route (Berlin to Butte des Morts) as WIS 18 acquired the entirety of old WIS 34. In 1927, the WIS 116 designation moved to use the Berlin to Butte des Morts route. As a result, WIS 34 moved back onto its old route. This time, it used its old route and then traveled eastward to US 10/US 12 in Fairchild (the extension is also now part of US 10). In 1935, WIS 34 moved onto its current route except for the US 10 expressway. This relocation happened in favor of replacing WIS 45 (which duplicated US 45 since 1935) and relocating US 10 southward (which superseded what used to be WIS 34).

Between July 2010 and October 2011, the US 10 expressway was being built. After its opening, WIS 34 moved onto part of the expressway.

== Major intersections ==
County	Location	mi	km	Destinations	Notes
Wood	Wisconsin Rapids	0.00	0.00	WIS 13 south / WIS 73 (Grand Avenue) – Wisconsin Dells, Wautoma, Marshfield	Southern terminus of WIS 34; southern end of WIS 13 concurrency
Wood	Wisconsin Rapids	2.99	4.81	WIS 66 / CTH-P east – Stevens Point	Western terminus of WIS 66
Wood	Rudolph	5.27	8.48	CTH-DD east	
Portage	Rudolph	7.28	11.72	CTH-C – Vesper, Business District	
Portage	Rudolph	9.34	15.03	CTH-M	
Portage	Junction City	14.26	22.95	CTH-P – Milladore, Junction City	
Portage	Junction City	14.42	23.21	US 10 west / WIS 13 north – Milladore, Marshfield	Northern end of WIS 13 concurrency; southern end of US 10 concurrency
Portage	Junction City	18.85	30.34	US 10 east / CTH-P west / CTH-HH east – Stevens Point, Junction City	Northern end of US 10 concurrency
Portage	Junction City	20.88	33.60	CTH-H	
Portage	Junction City	23.86	38.40	CTH-E east	
Marathon	Dancy	25.10	40.39	CTH-C west	Southern end of CTH-C concurrency
Marathon	Knowlton	25.10	40.39	CTH-C east / CTH-DB south – Knowlton	Northern end of CTH-C concurrency
Marathon	Knowlton	29.57	47.59	I-39 / US 51 – Stevens Point, Mosinee	Northern terminus of WIS 34
1.000 mi = 1.609 km; 1.000 km = 0.621 mi: Concurrency terminus
