= Wisconsin Highway 66 =

Highway in Wisconsin

State Trunk Highway 66
- WIS 66 highlighted in red

Route information
- Maintained by WisDOT
- Length: 18.73 mi (30.14 km)

Major junctions
- West end: WIS 13 / WIS 34 in Wisconsin Rapids
- I-39 / US 10 / US 51 in Stevens Point
- East end: WIS 49 in Rosholt

Location
- Country: United States
- State: Wisconsin
- Counties: Wood, Portage

Highway system
- Wisconsin State Trunk Highway System; Interstate; US; State; Scenic; Rustic
| ← WIS 65 | → WIS 67 |

State Trunk Highway 66 (often called Highway 66, STH-66 or WIS 66) is a state highway in the U.S. state of Wisconsin. It runs east–west in central Wisconsin from Rosholt to Stevens Point and along what used to be County Trunk Highway P (CTH-P) to Wisconsin Rapids. The entire length of this highway is designated the Polish Heritage Highway.

== Route description ==
WIS 66 originally began at the corner of Reserve and Main streets in downtown Stevens Point however once US Highway 10 (US 10) finished the expansion of the bypass around Stevens Point deserting the old US 10, plans arose to expand WIS 66 to use the former highway. This is how WIS 66 got its current-day route, which begins in Wisconsin Rapids traveling east on the Old CTH-P, it then adjoins the former US 10 which routes through downtown Stevens Point, passing the University of Wisconsin–Stevens Point campus, and later joins with current US 10, US 51, and Interstate 39 (I-39) traveling north. This creates a wrong-way concurrency with WIS 66 and US 10.

WIS 66 then departs from I-39/US 10/US 51 and continues northwest past the Stevens Point Municipal Airport, heading east at Jordan near the Jordan County Park of Portage County. This stretch and the remainder of the highway is the only part of the original WIS 66 before the 2009 highway expansion project.

After crossing CTH-J near the unincorporated town of Ellis, WIS 66 turns northwest again to Rosholt, where it becomes Grand Avenue. WIS 66 ends at the western intersection with WIS 49. Grand Avenue continues on as WIS 49 eastward.

== History ==
Initially, WIS 66 used to be on the other side of the Wisconsin River. It traveled along present-day WIS 54 from WIS 13 in Grand Rapids (now Wisconsin Rapids) to WIS 10/WIS 18 (now part of Bus. US 51 and CTH-B respectively) in Plover. In 1920, WIS 66 extended northeastward to WIS 16/WIS 39 (now WIS 29 and US 45 respectively) in Wittenburg. In 1924, WIS 54 extended westward, superseding the oldest portion of WIS 66 in the process. Also, WIS 49 extended northward, superseding the northeasternmost portion of WIS 66 (from Rosholt to Wittenburg). In the early 2010s, WIS 66 extended southwestward along former CTH-P to WIS 13 and WIS 34 near Wisconsin Rapids.

== Major intersections ==
| County | Location | mi | km | Destinations | Notes |
|---|---|---|---|---|---|
| Wood | Town of Grand Rapids | 0.00 | 0.00 | WIS 13 / WIS 34 – Wisconsin Rapids, Rudolph | |
| Portage | Stevens Point | | | Bus. US 51 (Division Street) | |
| Portage | Stevens Point | | | I-39 south / US 51 south – Portage US 10 east – Waupaca, Appleton | Southern end of I-39, US 10, and US 51 overlaps |
| Portage | Stevens Point | | | I-39 north / US 10 west / US 51 north – Wausau | Northern end of I-39, US 10, and US 51 overlaps |
| Portage | Town of Alban | | | WIS 49 – Iola, Elderon | |
1.000 mi = 1.609 km; 1.000 km = 0.621 mi: Concurrency terminus
