= Bancroft, Wisconsin =

Census-designated place in Wisconsin, United States

- Census-designated place
- Location within Wisconsin
- Coordinates: 44°18′35″N 89°30′49″W
- Country: United States
- State: Wisconsin
- County: Portage

Area
  - Total: 5.040 sq mi (13.05 km^{2})
  - Land: 5.030 sq mi (13.03 km^{2})
  - Water: 0.010 sq mi (0.026 km^{2})
- Elevation: 1,093 ft (333 m)

Population (2020)
  - Total: 526
  - Density: 105/sq mi (40.4/km^{2})
- Time zone: UTC-6 (Central (CST))
  - Summer (DST): UTC-5 (CDT)
- Zip code: 54921
- Area codes: 715 & 534
- GNIS feature ID: 1561145

Bancroft is an unincorporated census-designated place in Portage County, Wisconsin, United States. As of the 2020 census, its population was 526. It is included in the Stevens Point, Wisconsin Micropolitan Statistical Area.

Historical population
Census	Pop.	Note	%±
2010	535		—
2020	526		−1.7%
U.S. Decennial Census

== History ==
Bancroft was named for Warren Gamaliel Bancroft, who served in the 42nd Wisconsin Regiment during the American Civil War and later served as pastor of the Oshkosh Methodist Church. Bancroft was the name sake of Warren Gamaliel Bancroft Winnipeg Harding, who is better known as Warren G. Harding—the 29th president of the United States. A post office in the community was opened on May 17, 1876.

== Geography ==
Bancroft is located in central Wisconsin approximately 10 miles south of Plover and approximately five miles north of Plainfield. Bancroft rests on Portage County Road W just to the east of Interstate 39 / U.S. Highway 51, at exit 143. (Lat: 44° 18' 35.0", Lon: -89° 30' 49.7"). Bancroft is the seat for the Town of Pine Grove. Bancroft has an area of 5.040 square miles (13.05 km^{2}); 5.030 square miles (13.03 km^{2}) of this is land, and 0.010 square miles (0.026 km^{2}) is water.

The geography of Bancroft is mostly flat. There are, however, two bluffs that rise prominently above the otherwise level plains. One was a large bluff, commonly referred to as Mosquito Bluff, that runs in an east–west direction. Mosquito Bluff is now separated into two large hills by Harding Road.

The other prominent feature is known as The Ledge, which runs towards the North-East and is visible from I-39. This Bluff has gone by many names (Lover's Leap, Hellfire Hill, High Rock, Gulliver's Stool) but is most commonly known as The Ledge. At the top of The Ledge is an ichnite rock that has preserved traces of the passage of Climactichnites.
