= King, Lincoln County, Wisconsin =

King, Wisconsin
- Town
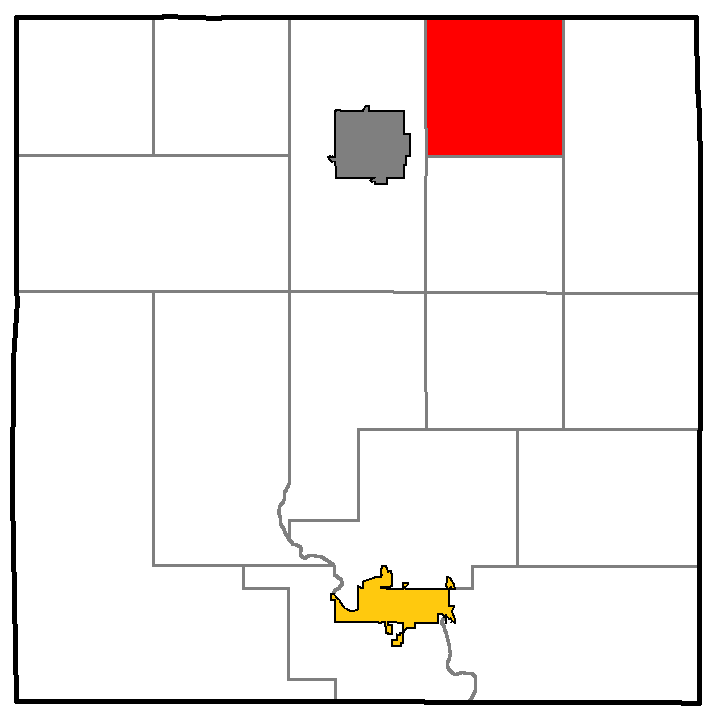
- Location of King, within Lincoln County

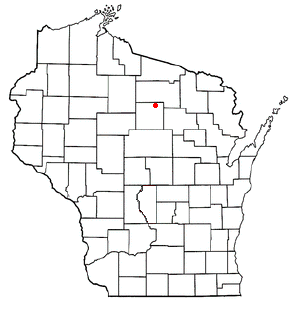
- Location in Wisconsin
- Coordinates: 45°30′37″N 89°36′36″W
- Country: United States
- State: Wisconsin
- County: Lincoln

Area
  - Total: 36.85 sq mi (95.43 km^{2})
  - Land: 33.41 sq mi (86.54 km^{2})
  - Water: 3.44 sq mi (8.90 km^{2})
- Elevation: 1,696 ft (517 m)

Population (2020)
  - Total: 964
  - Density: 28.9/sq mi (11.1/km^{2})
- Time zone: UTC-6 (Central (CST))
  - Summer (DST): UTC-5 (CDT)
- ZIP Code: 54487 (Tomahawk)
- Area codes: 715 & 534
- FIPS code: 55-39675
- GNIS feature ID: 1583482
- Website: townofkingwi.gov

King is a town in Lincoln County, Wisconsin, United States. The population was 964 at the 2020 census.

== Geography ==
King is in northern Lincoln County, bordered to the north by Oneida County. It is 9 miles (14 km) northeast of the city of Tomahawk. U.S. Routes 51 and 8 intersect in the northwestern corner of the town. US 51 leads north 26 miles (42 km) to Woodruff and south the same distance to Merrill, the Lincoln county seat, while US 8 leads northeast 15 miles (24 km) to Rhinelander and west 31 miles (50 km) to Prentice.

According to the United States Census Bureau, the town of King has a total area of 36.8 square miles (95.4 km^{2}), of which 33.4 square miles (86.5 km^{2}) are land and 3.4 square miles (8.9 km^{2}), or 9.32%, are water. The Wisconsin River crosses the town from northeast to southwest, the southwestern part being impounded by Kings Dam to form Lake Alice.

== Demographics ==
As of the census of 2000, there were 842 people, 362 households, and 270 families residing in the town. The population density was 24.9 people per square mile (9.6/km^{2}). There were 623 housing units at an average density of 18.4 per square mile (7.1/km^{2}). The racial makeup of the town was 98.81% White, 0.24% Asian, 0.12% Pacific Islander, 0.36% from other races, and 0.48% from two or more races. Hispanic or Latino people of any race were 0.59% of the population.

There were 362 households, out of which 21.8% had children under the age of 18 living with them, 68.5% were married couples living together, 3% had a female householder with no husband present, and 25.4% were non-families. 22.9% of all households were made up of individuals, and 11.6% had someone living alone who was 65 years of age or older. The average household size was 2.33 and the average family size was 2.71.

In the town, the population was spread out, with 18.5% under the age of 18, 4.3% from 18 to 24, 26.7% from 25 to 44, 30.3% from 45 to 64, and 20.2% who were 65 years of age or older. The median age was 45 years. For every 100 females, there were 104.9 males. For every 100 females age 18 and over, there were 102.4 males.

The median income for a household in the town was $37,500, and the median income for a family was $45,417. Males had a median income of $35,804 versus $23,333 for females. The per capita income for the town was $18,549. About 2% of families and 5.1% of the population were below the poverty line, including 4.3% of those under age 18 and 2.2% of those age 65 or over.
