= Special routes of U.S. Route 51 =

U.S. Route 51

Location
- Country: United States

Highway system
- United States Numbered Highway System; List; Special; Divided

Several special routes exist for U.S. Route 51.

== Ponchatoula–Hammond business route ==
U.S. Highway 51 Business
- Location: Ponchatoula–Hammond, Louisiana

== McComb business route ==
U.S. Highway 51 Business
- Location: McComb, Mississippi

The entire route is in McComb, Pike County.

mi	km	Destinations	Notes
		US 51	Southern terminus
		US 51	Northern terminus
1.000 mi = 1.609 km; 1.000 km = 0.621 mi

== Crystal Springs business route ==
U.S. Highway 51 Business
- Location: Crystal Springs, Mississippi

The entire route is in Crystal Springs, Copiah County.

mi	km	Destinations	Notes
		US 51 / MS 844 west to I-55 – Jackson, McComb	Southern terminus; eastern terminus of MS 844
		US 51	Northern terminus
1.000 mi = 1.609 km; 1.000 km = 0.621 mi

== Former Memphis truck route ==
U.S. Route 51 Truck
- Location: Memphis, Tennessee

== Dyersburg business route ==
U.S. Route 51 Business
- Location: Dyersburg, Tennessee

== South Fulton–Fulton bypass route ==
U.S. Route 51 Bypass
- Location: South Fulton, TN–Fulton, KY
- Existed: 1970–1989

U.S. Route 51 Bypass (US 51 Byp.) was a bypass of the downtown areas of South Fulton, Tennessee and Fulton, Kentucky. It was commissioned in 1970. In 1989, mainline US 51 and US 45 were moved to the bypass, and the bypass designation was decommissioned.

== Decatur business route ==
U.S. Route 51 Business
- Location: Decatur, Illinois
- Existed: 1978–2011

U.S. Route 51 Business (US 51 Bus.) was a business loop that ran through downtown Decatur, Illinois. It was commissioned in 1978, after a freeway bypass of Decatur was completed. In 1995, a freeway bypass of Elwin was completed, and US 51 Bus. was subsequently extended. In 2011, the route was decommissioned in an effort to reduce the amount of heavy truck traffic through downtown Decatur.

Major intersections
The entire route was in Macon County.

Location	mi	km	Destinations	Notes
South Wheatland Township			US 51 south	Northbound exit, southbound entrance to US 51
South Wheatland Township			US 51 to I-72 – Springfield, Bloomington, Pana	
Decatur			IL 105 west (Franklin Street) to IL 48 – Blue Mound, Taylorville	South end of IL 105 overlap
Decatur			IL 105 east (Lake Shore Drive)	North end of IL 105 overlap
Decatur			US 36 – Springfield, Tuscola	
Decatur			IL 48 / IL 121 – Taylorville, Lincoln, Argenta, Mattoon	
Decatur			I-72 / US 51 north – Champaign, Springfield, Bloomington	Roadway continued as US 51
1.000 mi = 1.609 km; 1.000 km = 0.621 mi: Concurrency terminus; Incomplete access

== Clinton business route ==
U.S. Route 51 Business
- Location: Clinton, Illinois
- Existed: 1983–present

U.S. Route 51 Business (US 51 Bus.) is a business loop that runs through downtown Clinton, Illinois. It was commissioned in 1983, after an expressway bypass of Clinton was completed.

Major intersections
The entire route is in Clinton, DeWitt County.

mi	km	Destinations	Notes
		US 51 south – Decatur	
		IL 54 / IL 10 – Lincoln, Champaign	
		US 51 north – Bloomington	
1.000 mi = 1.609 km; 1.000 km = 0.621 mi

== Bloomington–Normal business route ==
U.S. Route 51 Business
- Location: Bloomington–Normal, Illinois

== Beloit spur route ==
Spur U.S. Highway 51
- Location: Beloit, Wisconsin
- Length: 0.11 mi (180 m)

Spur U.S. Highway 51 (Spur US 51) is an unsigned spur route, connecting US 51 with WIS 213 via Broad Street in downtown Beloit, Wisconsin.

== Plover–Stevens Point business route ==
Business U.S. Highway 51
- Location: Plover–Stevens Point, Wisconsin
- Existed: 1971–2020

Business U.S. Highway 51 (Bus. US 51) was a business loop that ran through the communities of Plover, Whiting, and Stevens Point. The route was commissioned after a freeway bypass of the Stevens Point area was completed in 1971. Around 2009, the route through Stevens Point was removed from the Wisconsin State Trunk Highway System and became a city street, though the highway remained signed. In 2019, the American Association of State Highway and Transportation Officials approved eliminating Bus. US 51 as the remainder of the route was planned to be transferred to the villages of Plover and Whiting in 2020.

Major intersections
The entire route was in Portage County.

Location	mi	km	Destinations	Notes
Town of Buena Vista	0.00	0.00	I-39 / US 51 / WIS 54 east / Alt. I-39 south – Portage, Wausau, Waupaca	Southern end of WIS 54 and I-39 Alt overlap; roadway continues as WIS 54
Plover	2.08	3.35	WIS 54 west / CTH-B / Alt. I-39 north – Wisconsin Rapids, Amherst	Northern end of WIS 54 and I-39 Alt overlap
Stevens Point			WIS 66 east (Clark Street) / Alt. I-39 south	One-way pair; formerly US 10 east; south end of I-39 Alt overlap
Stevens Point			WIS 66 west (Main Street)	One-way pair; formerly US 10 west
Stevens Point			I-39 / US 51 / US 10 / Alt. I-39 ends – Wausau, Portage	North end of I-39 Alt
1.000 mi = 1.609 km; 1.000 km = 0.621 mi: Concurrency terminus

== Rothschild–Wausau business route ==
Business U.S. Highway 51
- Location: Rothschild–Wausau, Wisconsin
- Existed: 1963–present

Business U.S. Highway 51 (Bus. US 51) is a business loop serving the communities of Rothschild, Schofield, and Wausau, Wisconsin. It was commissioned in 1963, when an expressway bypass of the Wausau area was finished.

== Merrill business route ==
Business U.S. Highway 51
- Location: Merrill, Wisconsin
- Existed: 1976–1998

Business U.S. Highway 51 (Bus. US 51) was a business loop that served Merrill, Wisconsin. The business loop was established in 1976 after a freeway bypass was completed east of Merrill. In 1998, without any significant changes during its existence, it was then decommissioned in favor of CTH-K and CTH-Q.
