= Junction City, Wisconsin =

- Village
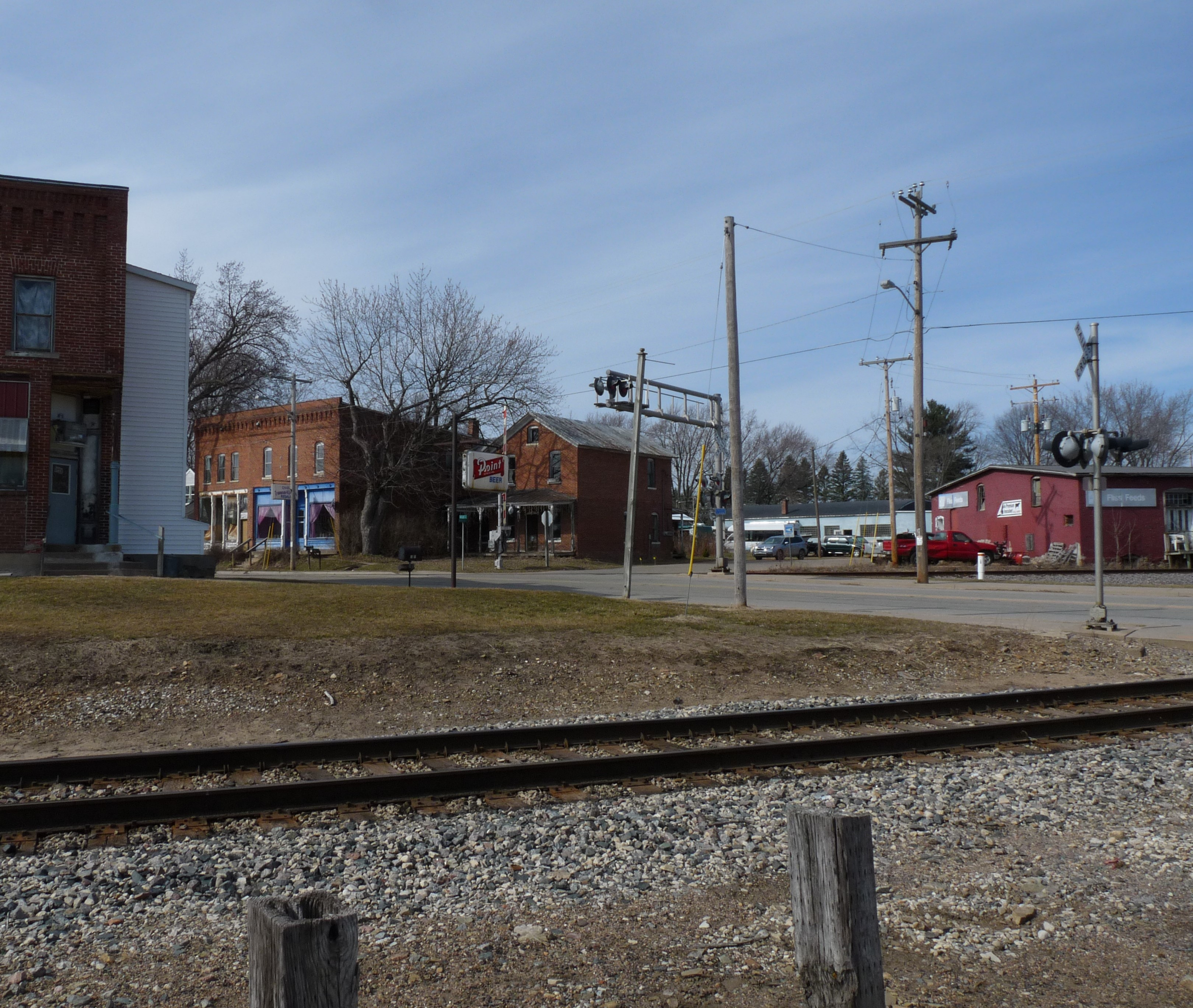
- Old buildings around the town's main junction

- Location of Junction City in Portage County, Wisconsin.
- Coordinates: 44°35′29″N 89°45′52″W
- Country: United States
- State: Wisconsin
- County: Portage

Area
  - Total: 1.51 sq mi (3.92 km^{2})
  - Land: 1.51 sq mi (3.90 km^{2})
  - Water: 0.0077 sq mi (0.02 km^{2})
- Elevation: 1,145 ft (349 m)

Population (2020)
  - Total: 420
  - Density: 280/sq mi (110/km^{2})
- Time zone: UTC-6 (Central (CST))
  - Summer (DST): UTC-5 (CDT)
- Zip code: 54443
- Area codes: 715 & 534
- FIPS code: 55-38650
- GNIS feature ID: 1567317

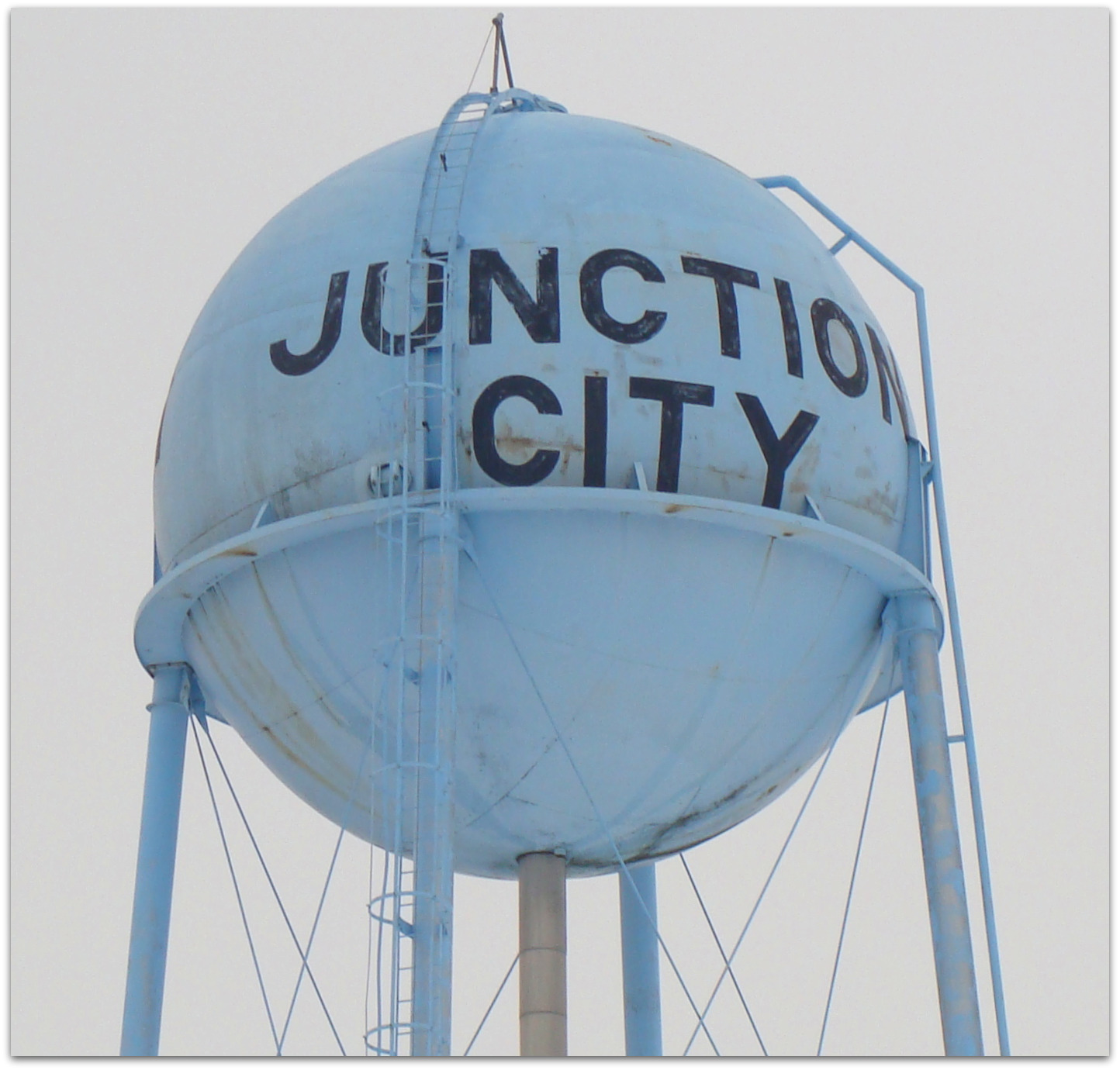
Water tower

Junction City is a village in Portage County, Wisconsin, United States. The population was 420 at the 2020 census.

== History ==
In 1872 the Wisconsin Central Railroad laid rail west from Stevens Point through forests and swamps, heading toward what would become Marshfield, aiming to eventually reach Lake Superior. In 1874 the Wisconsin Valley Railroad built a rail line north from Centralia (Wisconsin Rapids) to Wausau, crossing the Wisconsin Central. At the intersection of the two lines, cars could be switched and a community began to grow. In 1874 a post office was established there, with the name Junction.

In 1876 the Stevens Point Journal reported sudden growth at Junction City. The previous year the community had only two log shanties, but in 1876 there were "two depots, two saw mills, one hotel, one boarding house, one saloon, three dwelling houses and school house..." One of the sawmills may have operated a company store too. The hotel was called the Junction City Hotel & Billiard Hall.

An 1895 plat map shows two depots near the junction - one for each railroad. The Wisconsin Central's depot is also a hotel. Voyer House hotel is nearby, and the post office too. A school and the town hall appeared on what is now Main Street, away from the rail junction. By this time the junction also had several stores. Timber was still being cut in the surrounding lands, leaving behind fields of stumps, to be sold to farmers who survived by logging in winter.

In the 1890s graphite was found in the area. It was mined via an underground mine 70 feet deep, and processed in a crushing mill a mile northwest of Junction City. At times, the plant produced "several tons of the finished paint and paste product per day." This enterprise survived several fires and a damaging cyclone before closing in 1921.

In 1911 the community incorporated as a village named Junction City. That year's personal property roll counted eight horses in town, twelve cows, five people raising swine, and nine carriages etc., but no automobiles. In the early 1900s Junction City had four potato warehouses, serving the potato farmers in the surrounding Town of Carson.

A 1915 plat map shows one shared depot at the junction of the rail lines, with a line of businesses lining the west side of the Chicago, Milwaukee and St. Paul Railroad: saloon, office, post office, blacksmith shop, lunch room, saloon. Other businesses are scattered further out: the Junction City State Bank, two creameries, two "factories," the school, a store, and several warehouses. (By this time the Chicago, Milwaukee and St. Paul had absorbed the Wisconsin Valley Railroad and the Minneapolis, St. Paul and Sault Ste. Marie Railroad operated the Wisconsin Central.)

Fires had damaged and destroyed a number of enterprises over the years. Up to 1923 these fires were fought by informal bucket brigades, at best. In that year a volunteer fire department was formed, equipped with a cart pulled by hand and chemical pressure tanks.

By 1958 the rail lines still passed through Junction City, but U.S. Route 10 ran through town on Main Street, and trucks and autos were replacing train travel. The village had added several general stores, filling stations and garages, and a weekly newspaper called the Community Press. Much of the surrounding land had been converted from stumps to dairy farms.

Circa 2012, Highway 10 was rerouted north of Junction City, reducing traffic through town.

== Geography ==
Junction City is located at 44°35′29″N 89°45′52″W (44.591291, -89.764435).

According to the United States Census Bureau, the village has a total area of 1.57 square miles (4.07 km^{2}), of which 1.56 square miles (4.04 km^{2}) is land and 0.01 square miles (0.03 km^{2}) is water.

== Demographics ==
Historical population
Census	Pop.	Note	%±
1880	39		—
1920	275		—
1930	275		0.0%
1940	308		12.0%
1950	330		7.1%
1960	381		15.5%
1970	396		3.9%
1980	523		32.1%
1990	502		−4.0%
2000	440		−12.4%
2010	439		−0.2%
2020	420		−4.3%
U.S. Decennial Census

=== 2010 census ===
As of the census of 2010, there were 439 people, 169 households, and 115 families living in the village. The population density was 281.4 inhabitants per square mile (108.6/km^{2}). There were 211 housing units at an average density of 135.3 per square mile (52.2/km^{2}). The racial makeup of the village was 92.5% White, 0.2% African American, 0.2% Native American, 4.1% Asian, 1.4% from other races, and 1.6% from two or more races. Hispanic or Latino of any race were 3.2% of the population.

There were 169 households, of which 37.3% had children under the age of 18 living with them, 53.8% were married couples living together, 8.9% had a female householder with no husband present, 5.3% had a male householder with no wife present, and 32.0% were non-families. 27.8% of all households were made up of individuals, and 10.7% had someone living alone who was 65 years of age or older. The average household size was 2.60 and the average family size was 3.12.

The median age in the village was 31.6 years. 30.3% of residents were under the age of 18; 7.3% were between the ages of 18 and 24; 27.5% were from 25 to 44; 23.2% were from 45 to 64; and 11.6% were 65 years of age or older. The gender makeup of the village was 48.3% male and 51.7% female.

=== 2000 census ===
As of the census of 2000, there were 440 people, 169 households, and 106 families living in the village. The population density was 370.4 people per square mile (142.8/km^{2}). There were 193 housing units at an average density of 162.5 per square mile (62.6/km^{2}). The racial makeup of the village was 96.82% White, 1.59% Asian, 0.45% from other races, and 1.14% from two or more races. Hispanic or Latino of any race were 4.32% of the population.

There were 169 households, out of which 33.7% had children under the age of 18 living with them, 45.6% were married couples living together, 13.0% had a female householder with no husband present, and 36.7% were non-families. 31.4% of all households were made up of individuals, and 15.4% had someone living alone who was 65 years of age or older. The average household size was 2.60 and the average family size was 3.24.

In the village, the population was spread out, with 31.8% under the age of 18, 7.7% from 18 to 24, 31.4% from 25 to 44, 16.4% from 45 to 64, and 12.7% who were 65 years of age or older. The median age was 33 years. For every 100 females, there were 95.6 males. For every 100 females age 18 and over, there were 88.7 males.

The median income for a household in the village was $33,750, and the median income for a family was $42,031. Males had a median income of $31,375 versus $22,727 for females. The per capita income for the village was $17,648. About 13.9% of families and 15.8% of the population were below the poverty line, including 25.2% of those under age 18 and 12.8% of those age 65 or over.
