= Moundville, Wisconsin =

- Town
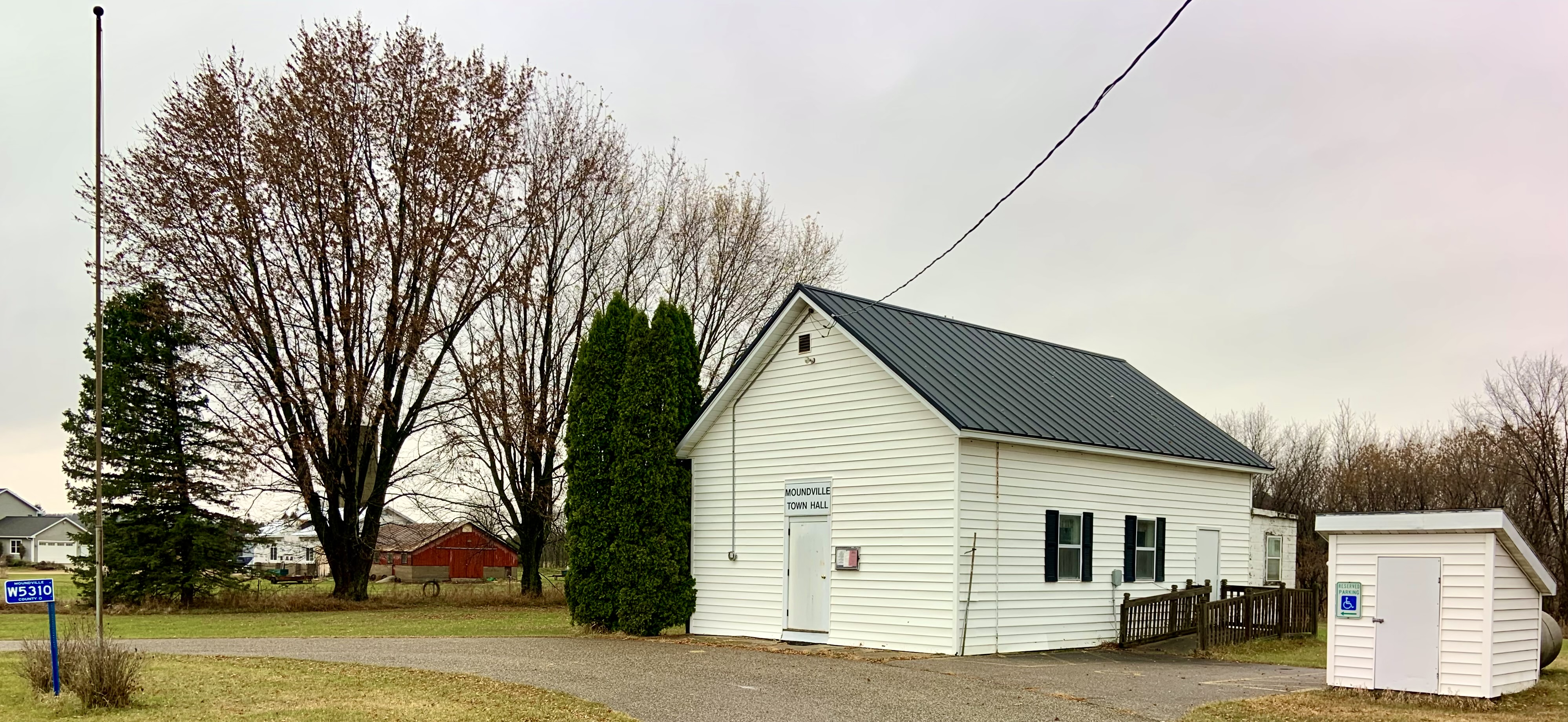
- Town hall

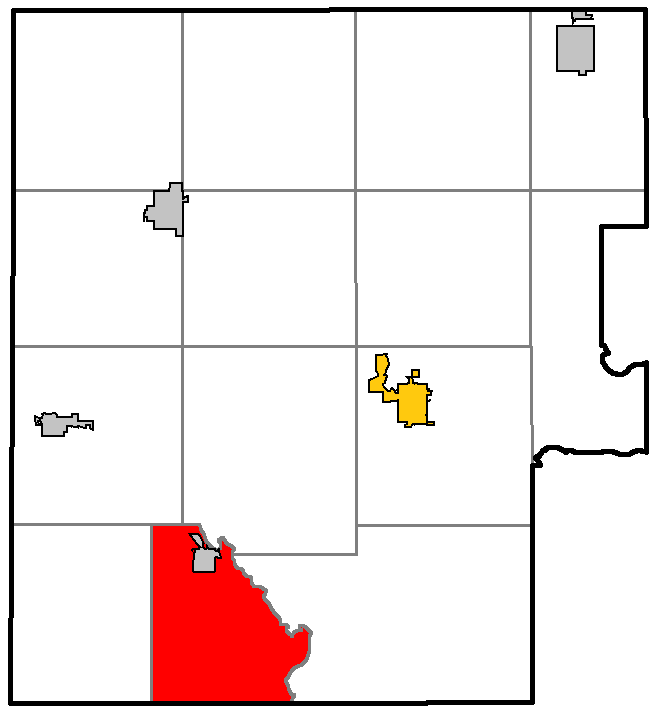
- Location of Moundville, Wisconsin

- Location of Marquette County, Wisconsin
- Coordinates: 43°40′29″N 89°28′3″W
- Country: United States
- State: Wisconsin
- County: Marquette

Area
  - Total: 23.2 sq mi (60.1 km^{2})
  - Land: 22.9 sq mi (59.4 km^{2})
  - Water: 0.27 sq mi (0.7 km^{2})
- Elevation: 790 ft (240 m)

Population (2020)
  - Total: 526
  - Density: 22.9/sq mi (8.86/km^{2})
- Time zone: UTC-6 (Central (CST))
  - Summer (DST): UTC-5 (CDT)
- FIPS code: 55-54600
- GNIS feature ID: 1583759
- Website: https://moundvillewi.gov/

Moundville is a town in Marquette County, Wisconsin, United States. The population was 526 at the 2020 census.

== Geography ==
According to the United States Census Bureau, the town has a total area of 23.2 square miles (60.1 km^{2}), of which 22.9 square miles (59.4 km^{2}) is land and 0.3 square miles (0.7 km^{2}) (1.16%) is water.

== Demographics ==
As of the census of 2000, there were 574 people, 209 households, and 159 families residing in the town. The population density was 25.0 people per square mile (9.7/km^{2}). There were 245 housing units at an average density of 10.7 per square mile (4.1/km^{2}). The racial makeup of the town was 96.69% White, 0.35% African American, 0.17% Native American, 0.87% Asian, 1.05% from other races, and 0.87% from two or more races. Hispanic or Latino people of any race were 4.18% of the population.

There were 209 households, out of which 35.9% had children under the age of 18 living with them, 63.6% were married couples living together, 6.2% had a female householder with no husband present, and 23.9% were non-families. 18.7% of all households were made up of individuals, and 9.6% had someone living alone who was 65 years of age or older. The average household size was 2.69 and the average family size was 3.03.

In the town, the population was spread out, with 29.1% under the age of 18, 5.7% from 18 to 24, 27.0% from 25 to 44, 22.1% from 45 to 64, and 16.0% who were 65 years of age or older. The median age was 38 years. For every 100 females, there were 100.7 males. For every 100 females age 18 and over, there were 106.6 males.

The median income for a household in the town was $40,893, and the median income for a family was $42,813. Males had a median income of $32,404 versus $23,750 for females. The per capita income for the town was $14,930. About 3.6% of families and 7.1% of the population were below the poverty line, including 6.4% of those under age 18 and 7.1% of those age 65 or over.

== See also ==
- List of towns in Wisconsin
