= Pine Grove, Portage County, Wisconsin =

Pine Grove
- Town
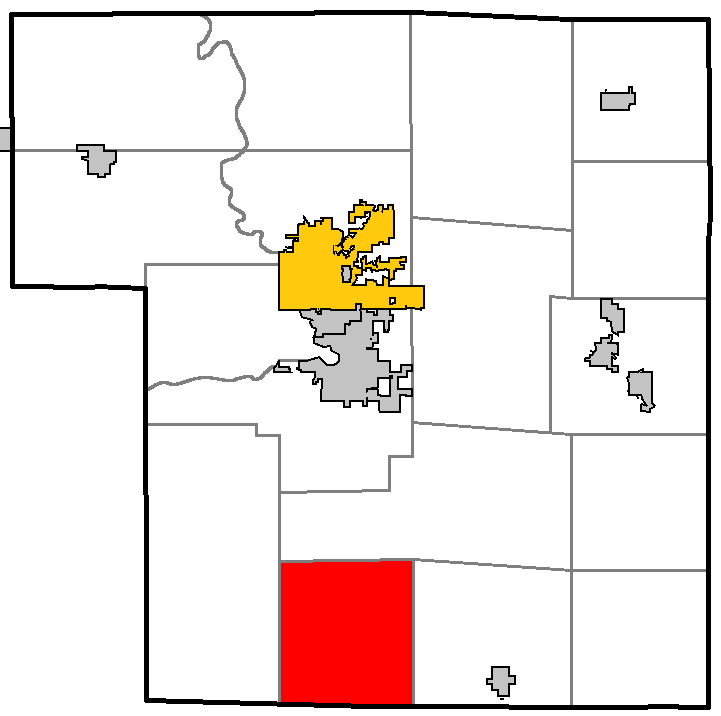
- Location of Pine Grove within Portage County

- Location within the state of Wisconsin
- Coordinates: 44°17′30″N 089°32′20″W
- Country: United States
- State: Wisconsin
- County: Portage

Area
  - Total: 37.7 sq mi (97.6 km^{2})
  - Land: 37.6 sq mi (97.5 km^{2})
  - Water: 0.039 sq mi (0.1 km^{2})
- Elevation: 1,079 ft (329 m)

Population (2020)
  - Total: 873
  - Density: 23.2/sq mi (8.95/km^{2})
- Time zone: UTC-6 (Central (CST))
  - Summer (DST): UTC-5 (CDT)
- Area codes: 715 & 534
- FIPS code: 5509762825
- GNIS feature ID: 1583924

Pine Grove is a town in Portage County, Wisconsin, United States. The population was 873 at the 2020 census. The unincorporated communities of Bancroft and West Bancroft are located within the town.

== Geography ==
According to the United States Census Bureau, the town has a total area of 37.7 square miles (97.6 km^{2}), of which 37.7 square miles (97.5 km^{2}) is land and 0.04 square mile (0.1 km^{2}) (0.11%) is water.

== Demographics ==
As of the census of 2000, there were 904 people, 333 households, and 243 families residing in the town. The population density was 24.0 people per square mile (9.3/km^{2}). There were 371 housing units at an average density of 9.9 per square mile (3.8/km^{2}). The racial makeup of the town was 92.70% White, 0.11% African American, 0.22% Native American, 1.22% Asian, 0.11% Pacific Islander, 4.09% from other races, and 1.55% from two or more races. 10.29% of the population were Hispanic or Latino of any race.

There were 333 households, out of which 37.2% had children under the age of 18 living with them, 59.5% were married couples living together, 8.7% had a female householder with no husband present, and 27.0% were non-families. 23.4% of all households were made up of individuals, and 8.7% had someone living alone who was 65 years of age or older. The average household size was 2.71 and the average family size was 3.21.

In the town, the population was spread out, with 28.7% under the age of 18, 9.0% from 18 to 24, 29.1% from 25 to 44, 22.5% from 45 to 64, and 10.8% who were 65 years of age or older. The median age was 36 years. For every 100 females, there were 107.3 males. For every 100 females age 18 and over, there were 106.7 males.

The median income for a household in the town was $35,294, and the median income for a family was $38,824. Males had a median income of $32,273 versus $17,891 for females. The per capita income for the town was $18,257. 10.0% of the population and 6.6% of families were below the poverty line. Out of the total people living in poverty, 12.1% are under the age of 18 and 9.0% are 65 or older.
