= Oxford (town), Wisconsin =

Town in Marquette County, Wisconsin, United States

Oxford, Wisconsin
- Town
- Town of Oxford
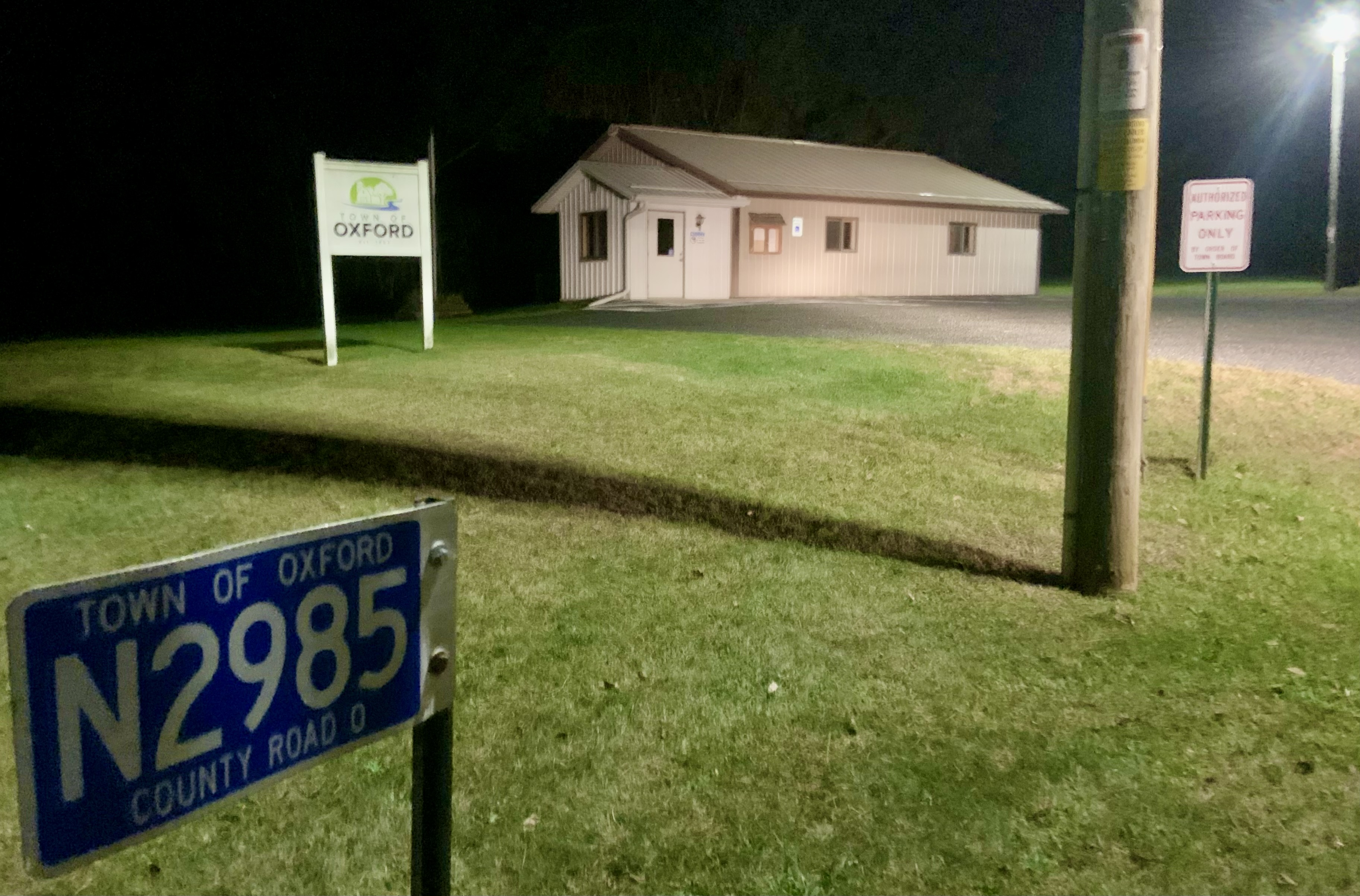
- Oxford Town Hall

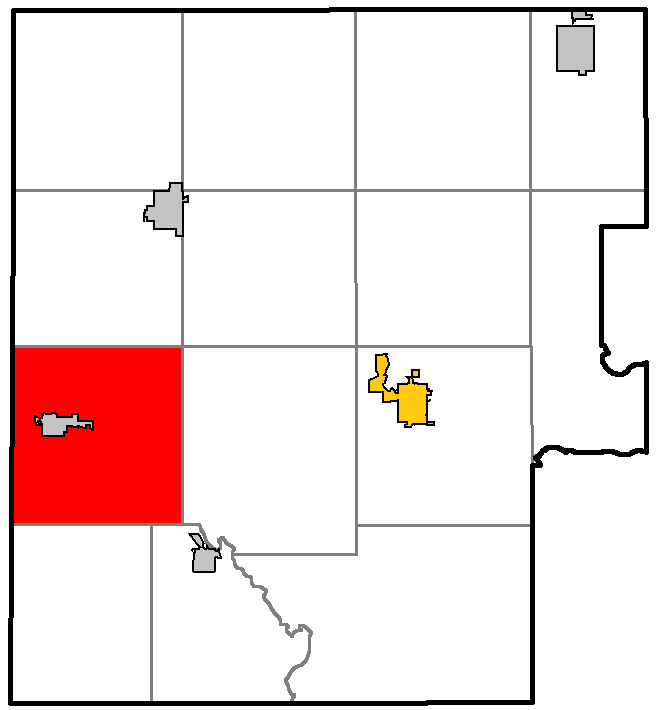
- Location of Oxford, within Marquette County, Wisconsin

- Location of Marquette County, Wisconsin
- Coordinates: 43°46′12″N 89°32′22″W
- Country: United States
- State: Wisconsin
- County: Marquette

Area
  - Total: 33.88 sq mi (87.7 km^{2})
  - Land: 33.73 sq mi (87.4 km^{2})
  - Water: 0.16 sq mi (0.41 km^{2})

Population (2020)
  - Total: 930
  - Density: 28/sq mi (11/km^{2})
- Time zone: UTC-6 (Central (CST))
  - Summer (DST): UTC-5 (CDT)
- Area code(s): 608 and 353
- GNIS feature ID: 1583886
- Website: https://townofoxfordwi.com/

Oxford is a town in Marquette County, Wisconsin, United States. The population was 930 at the 2020 census. The Village of Oxford is located within the town.

== Geography ==
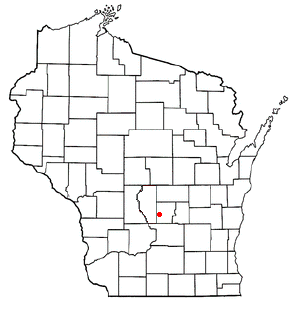
Location of Oxford (town), Wisconsin

According to the United States Census Bureau, the town has a total area of 33.5 square miles (86.8 km^{2}), of which 33.4 square miles (86.4 km^{2}) is land and 0.2 square mile (0.4 km^{2}) (0.51%) is water.

== Demographics ==
As of the census of 2000, there were 859 people, 337 households, and 244 families residing in the town. The population density was 25.8 people per square mile (9.9/km^{2}). There were 470 housing units at an average density of 14.1 per square mile (5.4/km^{2}). The racial makeup of the town was 97.44% White, 0.23% Black or African American, 0.58% Native American, 0.23% Asian, 0.70% Pacific Islander, 0.58% from other races, and 0.23% from two or more races. 0.93% of the population were Hispanic or Latino of any race.

There were 337 households, out of which 30.0% had children under the age of 18 living with them, 64.7% were married couples living together, 4.5% had a female householder with no husband present, and 27.3% were non-families. 20.8% of all households were made up of individuals, and 8.9% had someone living alone who was 65 years of age or older. The average household size was 2.55 and the average family size was 2.93.

In the town, the population was spread out, with 24.6% under the age of 18, 5.9% from 18 to 24, 28.4% from 25 to 44, 27.2% from 45 to 64, and 13.9% who were 65 years of age or older. The median age was 41 years. For every 100 females, there were 109.5 males. For every 100 females age 18 and over, there were 108.4 males.

The median income for a household in the town was $40,217, and the median income for a family was $42,159. Males had a median income of $31,313 versus $23,011 for females. The per capita income for the town was $16,458. About 4.0% of families and 5.9% of the population were below the poverty line, including 5.4% of those under age 18 and 11.8% of those age 65 or over.
