= Plainfield (town), Wisconsin =

Town in Waushara County, Wisconsin

Plainfield, Wisconsin
- Town
- Town of Plainfield
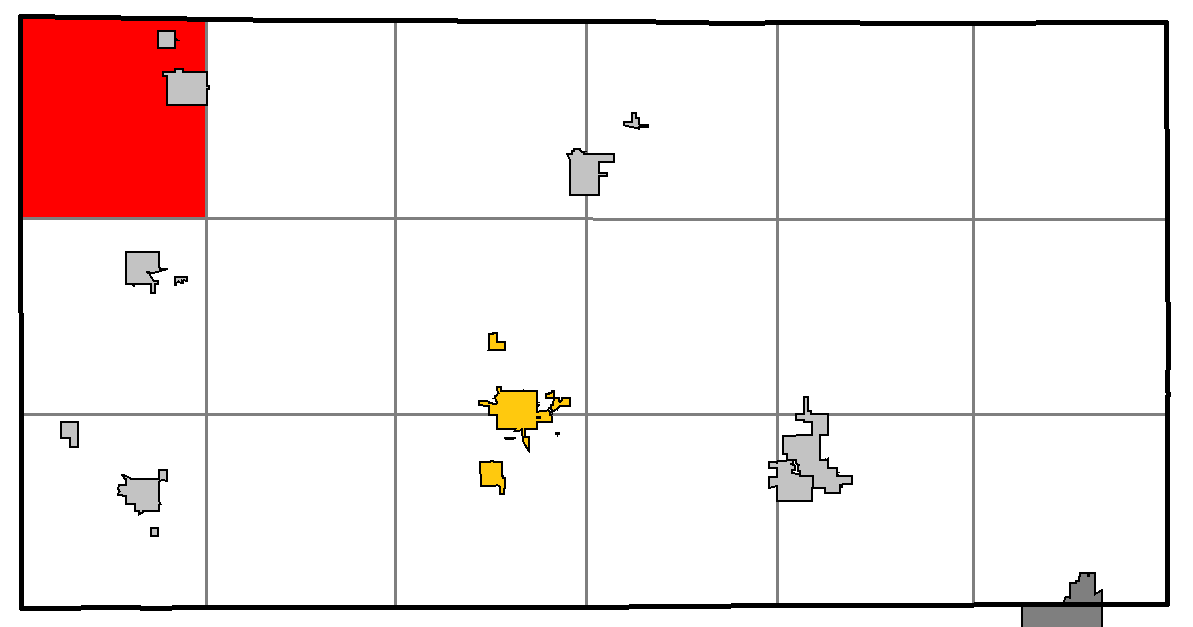
- Location of Plainfield, within Waushara County

- Location of Waushara County, Wisconsin
- Coordinates: 44°12′24″N 89°32′20″W
- Country: United States
- State: Wisconsin
- County: Waushara County, Wisconsin

Area
  - Total: 33.61 sq mi (87.0 km^{2})
  - Land: 33.60 sq mi (87.0 km^{2})
  - Water: 0.01 sq mi (0.026 km^{2})

Population (2020)
  - Total: 496
  - Density: 14.8/sq mi (5.70/km^{2})
- Time zone: UTC-6 (Central (CST))
  - Summer (DST): UTC-5 (CDT)
- Area code(s): 715 and 534
- GNIS feature ID: 1583932

Plainfield is a town in Waushara County, Wisconsin, United States. The population was 496 as of the 2020 census. The village of Plainfield is surrounded by the town. The ghost town of West Plainfield (still the present day site of the Town of Plainfield town hall) is located in the town.

== Geography ==
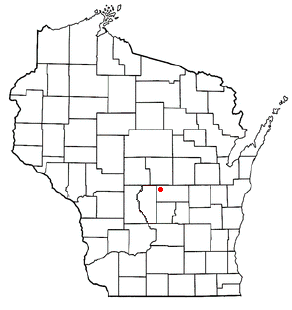
Location of Plainfield (town), Wisconsin

According to the United States Census Bureau, the town has a total area of 34.0 square miles (88.0 km^{2}), of which 34.0 square miles (87.9 km^{2}) is land and 0.03% is water.

== Demographics ==
As of the census of 2000, there were 533 people, 198 households, and 146 families residing in the town. The population density was 15.7 people per square mile (6.1/km^{2}). There were 230 housing units at an average density of 6.8 per square mile (2.6/km^{2}). The racial makeup of the town was 96.62% White, 0.19% Asian, 3.00% from other races, and 0.19% from two or more races. 9.76% of the population were Hispanic or Latino of any race.

There were 198 households, out of which 34.8% had children under the age of 18 living with them, 61.6% were married couples living together, 6.1% had a female householder with no husband present, and 25.8% were non-families. 19.2% of all households were made up of individuals, and 6.6% had someone living alone who was 65 years of age or older. The average household size was 2.69 and the average family size was 3.10.

In the town, the population was spread out, with 28.1% under the age of 18, 7.5% from 18 to 24, 26.6% from 25 to 44, 25.1% from 45 to 64, and 12.6% who were 65 years of age or older. The median age was 37 years. For every 100 females, there were 115.8 males. For every 100 females age 18 and over, there were 109.3 males.

The median income for a household in the town was $38,462, and the median income for a family was $41,406. Males had a median income of $32,000 versus $19,861 for females. The per capita income for the town was $16,432. About 9.1% of families and 11.4% of the population were below the poverty line, including 19.5% of those under age 18 and 5.2% of those age 65 or over.
