= Hull, Portage County, Wisconsin =

Hull, Wisconsin
- Town
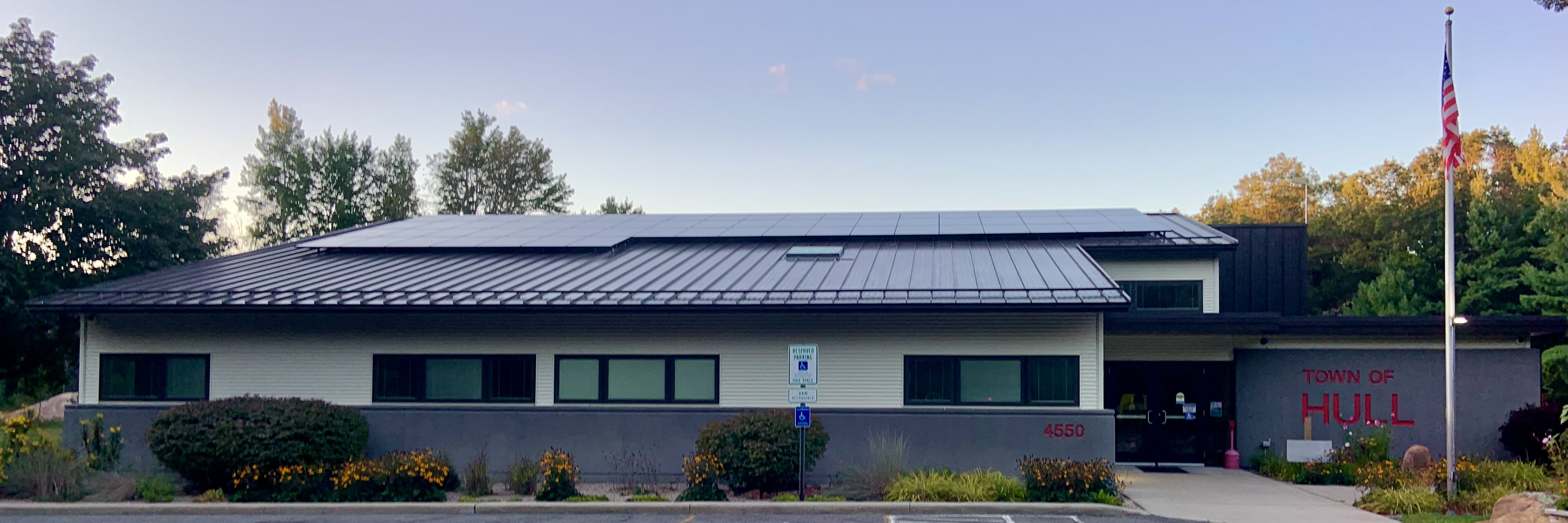
- Town hall

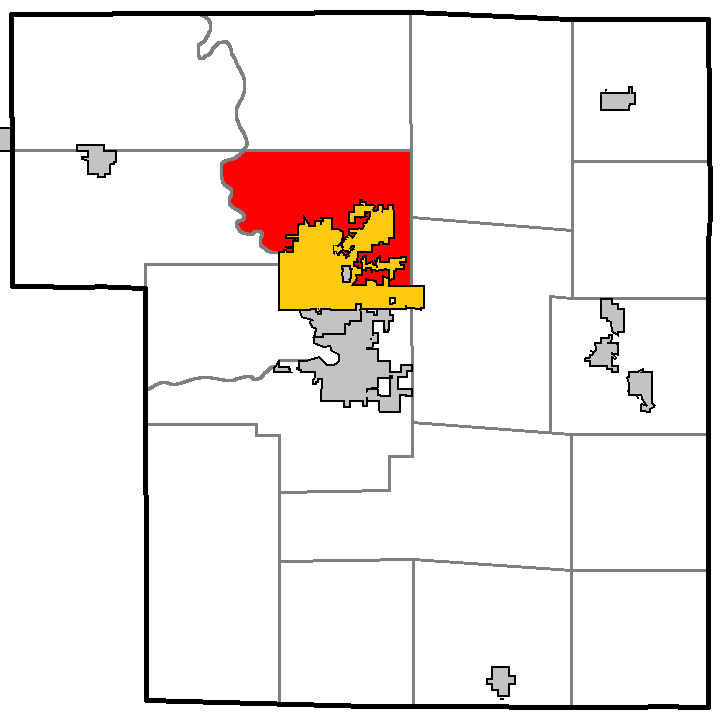
- Location of Hull, Portage County, Wisconsin

- Location of Portage County, Wisconsin
- Coordinates: 44°32′41″N 89°32′56″W
- Country: United States
- State: Wisconsin
- County: Portage

Area
  - Total: 31.9 sq mi (82.5 km^{2})
  - Land: 28.3 sq mi (73.2 km^{2})
  - Water: 3.6 sq mi (9.3 km^{2})
- Elevation: 1,129 ft (344 m)

Population (2020)
  - Total: 5,287
  - Density: 187/sq mi (72.2/km^{2})
- Time zone: UTC-6 (Central (CST))
  - Summer (DST): UTC-5 (CDT)
- Area codes: 715 & 534
- FIPS code: 55-36350
- GNIS feature ID: 1583421
- Website: https://www.townofhull.us/

Hull is a town in Portage County, Wisconsin, United States. The population was 5,287 at the 2020 census. The unincorporated communities of Casimir and Jordan are located in the town. It is included in the Stevens Point Micropolitan Statistical Area.

== Geography ==
According to the United States Census Bureau, the town has a total area of 31.8 square miles (82.5 km^{2}), of which 28.3 square miles (73.2 km^{2}) is land and 3.6 square miles (9.2 km^{2}) (11.21%) is water.

== Demographics ==
As of the census of 2000, there were 5,493 people, 1,988 households, and 1,582 families residing in the town. The population density was 194.3 people per square mile (75.0/km^{2}). There were 2,067 housing units at an average density of 73.1 per square mile (28.2/km^{2}). The racial makeup of the town was 97.78% White, 0.27% African American, 0.31% Native American, 0.58% Asian, 0.15% from other races, and 0.91% from two or more races. Hispanic or Latino of any race were 0.91% of the population.

There were 1,988 households, out of which 39.2% had children under the age of 18 living with them, 72.2% were married couples living together, 4.4% had a female householder with no husband present, and 20.4% were non-families. 16.1% of all households were made up of individuals, and 5.4% had someone living alone who was 65 years of age or older. The average household size was 2.76 and the average family size was 3.10.

In the town, the population was spread out, with 27.8% under the age of 18, 6.9% from 18 to 24, 29.4% from 25 to 44, 27.3% from 45 to 64, and 8.6% who were 65 years of age or older. The median age was 38 years. For every 100 females, there were 104.9 males. For every 100 females age 18 and over, there were 104.6 males.

The median income for a household in the town was $53,915, and the median income for a family was $60,689. Males had a median income of $38,231 versus $25,307 for females. The per capita income for the town was $22,433. About 3.6% of families and 5.2% of the population were below the poverty line, including 7.6% of those under age 18 and 4.5% of those age 65 or over.
