= Beltline Highway =

The Beltline Highway may refer to:

- Oregon Route 569
- U.S. Route 12 and parts of U.S. Route 14, U.S. Route 18, and U.S. Route 151 in the Madison, Wisconsin area, from the interchange of U.S. Route 12 and U.S. Route 14 in Middleton, Wisconsin east to the interchange with Interstates 39 and 90
