= Wisconsin Highway 23 =

State highway in Wisconsin, United States

State Trunk Highway 23
- WIS 23; mainline in red, business route in blue

Route information
- Maintained by WisDOT
- Length: 211.05 mi (339.65 km)

Major junctions
- South end: WIS 11 in Shullsburg
- US 151 in Mineral Point; US 18 in Dodgeville; US 14 / WIS 60 in Spring Green; I-90 / I-94 in Lake Delton; US 12 / WIS 13 / WIS 16 in Wisconsin Dells; I-39 / US 51 in Moundville; I-39 / US 51 / WIS 82 in Oxford; I-41 / US 41 in Fond du Lac; US 45 in Fond du Lac; I-43 in Sheboygan
- East end: WIS 28 / WIS 42 / LMCT in Sheboygan

Location
- Country: United States
- State: Wisconsin
- Counties: Lafayette, Iowa, Sauk, Columbia, Adams, Marquette, Green Lake, Fond du Lac, Sheboygan

Highway system
- Wisconsin State Trunk Highway System; Interstate; US; State; Scenic; Rustic
← WIS 22	→ WIS 24

State Trunk Highway 23 (often called Highway 23, STH-23 or WIS 23) is a state highway in the U.S. state of Wisconsin. The highway's route is signed as a north–south route from Shullsburg to Wisconsin Dells and as an east–west route from Wisconsin Dells to Sheboygan. With the exception of freeway segments between Sheboygan Falls and Sheboygan, an expressway segment between Sheboygan Falls past Greenbush to Fond du Lac, a freeway concurrency with Interstate 39 (I-39), and an expressway segment concurrent with U.S. Highway 151 (US 151), the highway is generally either two-lane surface road or urban multilane arterial. WIS 23 provides access to several important Wisconsin destinations, such as the House on the Rock, the Wisconsin Dells area and various state parks.

== Route description ==
=== Shullsburg to Reedsburg ===
WIS 23 begins at WIS 11 in Lafayette County, five miles (8.0 km) east of Shullsburg and passes north through Darlington. WIS 23 shares one mile (1.6 km) of road with WIS 81 starting at Avon, just south of the city, and ending in Darlington. WIS 23 passes through rolling hills in the town of Willow Springs and enters Iowa County 10 miles (16 km) north of the city. From the county line, WIS 23 turns northwestward to Mineral Point. WIS 39 joins the route one mile (1.6 km) southeast of the city, and turns west off in the downtown area. WIS 23 turns northeast and joins US 151 for a four-mile (6.4 km) expressway concurrency. WIS 23 turns off US 151 at a trumpet interchange and passes through downtown Dodgeville. The highway junctions with WIS 191 in the city and crosses US 18 on the north side. Access to Governor Dodge State Park is provided off WIS 23. The highway passes the House on the Rock nine miles (14 km) north of Dodgeville. WIS 23 passes Tower Hill State Park at the Sauk County line.

WIS 23 passes through Spring Green upon entering Sauk County and crosses US 14 just north of the village. The highway passes through Plain about six miles (9.7 km) north of US 14 and Loganville another eleven miles (18 km) further north. WIS 154 joins the route in Loganville. then turns off the route to the east three miles (4.8 km) further north.

=== Reedsburg to Sheboygan ===
After another four miles (6.4 km), WIS 23 joins WIS 33 and becomes an east–west route in Reedsburg and follows the route east for six miles (9.7 km), before turning off northeast and stair-stepping in that direction toward Lake Delton. The highway passes through Mirror Lake State Park just prior to entering the village via Monroe Avenue. WIS 23 joins US 12 west and both routes turn north into the heart of the Wisconsin Dells tourism district along Wisconsin Dells Parkway north – passing attractions such as Noah's Ark Waterpark the Wisconsin Ducks boat tours, and Tommy Bartlett's Thrill Show WIS 23 turns at the junction with WIS 13 and WIS 16 with both routes following it eastbound along Broadway Street through downtown Wisconsin Dells and into Columbia County

WIS 13 turns north and WIS 16 turns south just east of the city and WIS 23 turns north into Adams County two miles (3.2 km) east of Wisconsin Dells. The highway then turns east, passing near Big Spring on the way into Marquette County after a six-mile (9.7 km) journey through Adams County. WIS 23 stairsteps northeast to Endeavor where it joins I-39/US 51 for six miles (9.7 km) before turning east off the interstate five miles (8.0 km) east of Oxford. WIS 23 passes through Montello and has a brief cosign with WIS 22 before turning northeast and entering Green Lake County six miles (9.7 km) northeast of Montello.

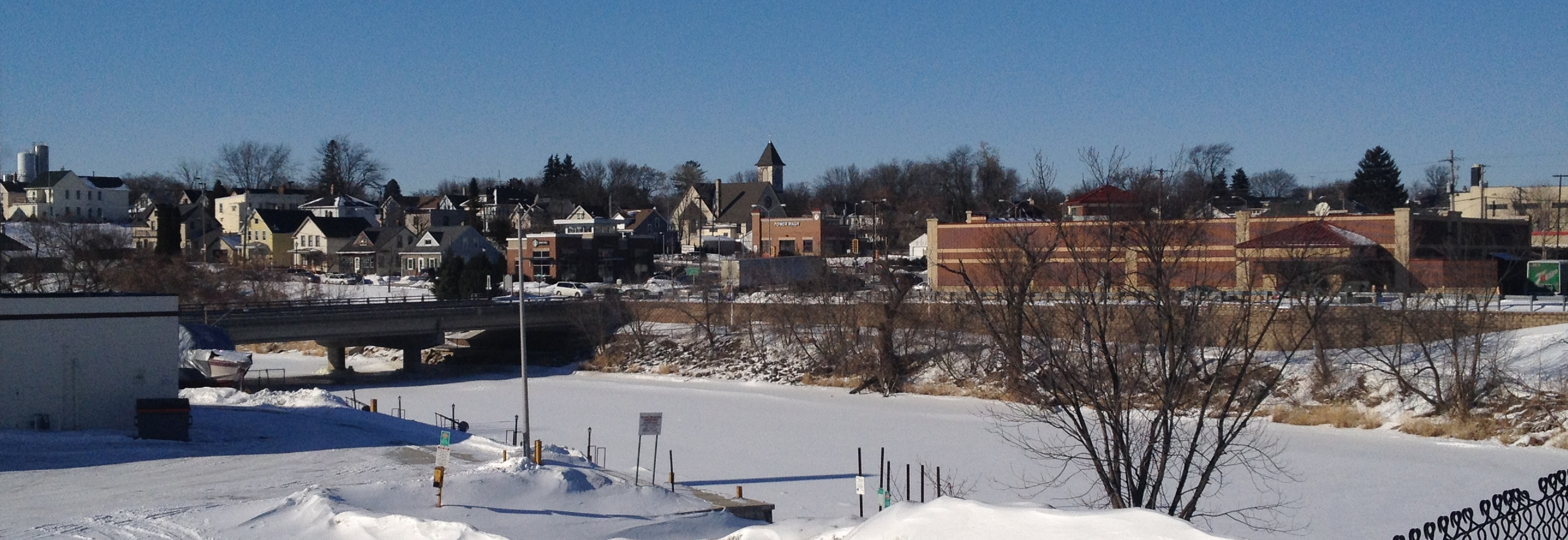
The three-highway terminus in Sheboygan; WIS 23 starts going west from the location shown

WIS 23 joins WIS 73 on the west side of Princeton. They head east along Main Street then south along Fulton Street before leaving the city. They continue to be cosigned heading east for another three miles (4.8 km) before WIS 73 turns south to head to Randolph and Columbus. WIS 23 passes north of Green Lake and is joined by WIS 49 northeast of the city. A business route of WIS 23 exists, using Lawson Dr in Green Lake. The highway concurrency of 23 and 49 enters Fond du Lac County two miles (3.2 km) east of Green Lake. 23 and 49 continue heading southeast to Ripon. On the southeast side of Ripon, WIS 49 South, along with WIS 44 South, cuts south toward Brandon, Markesan and Waupun. WIS 44 has a short cosign with WIS 23 on the eastside of Ripon before it cuts north to Pickett and Oshkosh. WIS 23 continues east, crossing WIS 26 in Rosendale. As the highway enters Fond du Lac, it junctions with I-41 and becomes Johnson St., the main east–west thoroughfare through the city. WIS 23 crosses US 45 in the city center and US 151 on the east side. After a 12-mile (19 km) rural stretch from Fond du Lac, WIS 23 enters Sheboygan County The route passes near Greenbush about four miles (6.4 km) into the county, then becomes a freeway about two miles (3.2 km) northwest of Plymouth, without exit numbering. Around Plymouth, access is provided to County Trunk Highway C (CTH-C), WIS 67, CTH-E, and WIS 57. In Sheboygan Falls, an interchange is present at WIS 32. WIS 23 junctions with I-43 at a cloverleaf interchange just west of Sheboygan. The freeway segment ends a mile (1.6 km) east of I-43 at North 25th Street, with an exit at Taylor Drive. WIS 23 follows Kohler Memorial Drive and the straight-line portion of Erie Ave into the city, continuing as a divided highway until three blocks before its termination at WIS 28 south and WIS 42 north. Erie Avenue continues undesignated for about 0.9 miles (1.4 km) east, until coming to an end at a cul-de-sac a block west of Lake Michigan, overlooking Broughton Drive.

== History ==
The original 1918 routing of WIS 23 ended the route on the western terminus at Packwaukee at its junction with WIS 10. The route to the east of that point still exists as it is today. The route was extended in the early 1920s to the southwest, following its present routing from Packwaukee through Kilbourn (present day Wisconsin Dells), Reedsburg and Dodgeville, then along present day US 151 from Dodgeville to Dubuque, Iowa via Mineral Point and Platteville. Later in that decade, the route was truncated back to Dodgeville when US 118 was signed, but then extended again—this time along its current route when US 118 became part of US 151.

WIS 23 was relocated in the Sheboygan area to bypass Plymouth and Sheboygan Falls. Plans for this existed as early as 1972. Grading for the old alignment is still visible to the southwest of the current WIS 23/I-43 interchange, and the rest of the old alignment is still in use today as Greenfield Drive, along with Twin Oaks Drive, which was reconfigured into a plant access road for the Kohler Company campus.

Proposals were considered that would have rerouted WIS 23 around Lake Delton by following CTH-H from Reedsburg directly to Wisconsin Dells, but were never pursued due to pressure from the village of Lake Delton and the area's tourist attractions like hotels and resorts fearing lost business from the re-routing.

The Wisconsin Department of Transportation (WisDOT) had made WIS 23 between Fond du Lac and Sheboygan a priority state corridor in its highway planning, studying the expansion of WIS 23 from Fond du Lac to Plymouth to a four-lane expressway, as the rural two-lane portion between Mount Calvary and Greenbush towards the county line, along with the two-lane narrowing just outside of Fond du Lac on a steep grade into the Kettle Moraine State Forest area, was a stretch where various crashes with casualties occurred. A draft environmental impact statement was presented in 2004 and the bypass route following the existing alignment was chosen in 2005. Construction of the expansion was scheduled to begin in 2015, but was delayed by a lawsuit by an environmental group which prevented delegation of federal funds until resolved, along with overall political issues involving the state transportation budget. A new environmental study was compiled, filed and approved in October 2018. Construction began on the conversion and expansion in May 2019, and was concluded in the fall of 2022.

== Major intersections ==
County	Location	mi	km	Exit	Destinations	Notes
Lafayette	Town of Shullsburg	0.000	0.000		WIS 11 – Gratiot, Monroe, Shullsburg; CTH-P	Southern terminus; roadway continues as CTH-P
Lafayette	Darlington				WIS 81 west – Platteville	Southern end of WIS 81 concurrency
Lafayette	Darlington				WIS 81 east (Louisa Street)	Northern end of WIS 81 concurrency
Iowa	Town of Mineral Point				WIS 39 east – Hollandale	Southern end of WIS 39 concurrency
Iowa	Mineral Point				Bus. US 151 south / WIS 39 west – Platteville, Linden	Northern end of WIS 39 concurrency; southern end of Bus. US 151 concurrency
Iowa	Town of Mineral Point				US 151 south Bus. US 151 south – Platteville	Interchange; northern terminus of Bus. US 151; northern end of Bus. US 151 concurrency; southern end of US 151 concurrency; US 151 exit 40
Iowa	Town of Dodgeville				US 151 north – Madison	Interchange; northern end of US 151 concurrency; US 151 exit 44
Iowa	Dodgeville				WIS 191 east (Division St)	
Iowa	Dodgeville				US 18 – Prairie du Chien, Madison	
Iowa	Town of Dodgeville				WIS 130 north – Lone Rock	
Sauk	Spring Green				US 14 east – Mazomanie	Southern end of US 14 concurrency
Sauk	Spring Green				WIS 60 east – Sauk City	Southern end of WIS 60 concurrency
Sauk	Spring Green				US 14 west / WIS 60 west – Lone Rock, Richland Center	Northern end of US 14 and WIS 60 concurrencies
Sauk	Loganville				WIS 154 west (Walnut Street)	Southern end of WIS 154 concurrency
Sauk	Town of Reedsburg				WIS 154 east – Rock Springs	Northern end of WIS 154 concurrency
Sauk	Reedsburg				WIS 33 west (Main Street west)	Southern end of WIS 33 concurrency
Sauk	Reedsburg–Excelsior town line				WIS 136 east – Rock Springs	
Sauk	Town of Excelsior				WIS 33 east – Baraboo	Northern end of WIS 33 concurrency
Sauk	Lake Delton				I-90 / I-94 – Madison, Tomah	I-90 exit 89
Sauk	Lake Delton				US 12 east – Baraboo	Southern end of US 12 concurrency
Sauk	Wisconsin Dells				WIS 13 south – Madison US 12 west / WIS 16 west – Mauston, Lyndon Station	Northern end of US 12 concurrency; directional signage change; western end of WIS 13 and WIS 16 concurrencies
Columbia	Wisconsin Dells				WIS 13 north – Wisconsin Rapids, Adams WIS 16 east / Alt. I-39 south – Portage	Eastern end of WIS 13 and WIS 16 concurrencies; western end of Alt. I-39 concurrency
Adams	No major junctions					
Marquette	Town of Moundville				I-39 south / US 51 south / Alt. I-39 south – Portage	Northern terminus of Alt. I-39; eastern end of Alt. I-39 concurrency; western end of I-39/US 51 concurrency; I-39 exit 100
Marquette	Oxford–Packwaukee town line			104	CTH-D – Packwaukee	Eastbound exit and westbound entrance
Marquette	Oxford–Packwaukee town line				I-39 north / US 51 north / WIS 82 west – Oxford, Stevens Point	Eastern end of I-39/US 51 concurrency; eastern terminus of WIS 82; I-39 exit 106
Marquette	Montello				WIS 22 south – Pardeeville	Western end of WIS 22 concurrency
Marquette	Montello				WIS 22 north – Wautoma	Eastern end of WIS 22 concurrency
Green Lake	Princeton				WIS 73 north – Wautoma	Western end of WIS 73 concurrency
Green Lake	Town of Princeton				WIS 73 south – Randolph	Eastern end of WIS 73 concurrency
Green Lake	Green Lake				WIS 49 north – Berlin	Western end of WIS 49 concurrency
Fond du Lac	Ripon				Union Street to WIS 44 north	
Fond du Lac	Ripon				WIS 44 south / WIS 49 south (Metomen Street)	Eastern end of WIS 49 concurrency; western end of WIS 44 concurrency
Fond du Lac	Ripon				WIS 44 north (Douglas Street)	Eastern end of WIS 49 concurrency
Fond du Lac	Rosendale				WIS 26 – Oshkosh, Waupun	
Fond du Lac	Fond du Lac				I-41 (US 41) / US 45 south – Green Bay, Milwaukee	Western end of US 45 concurrency; I-41 exit 99
Fond du Lac	Fond du Lac				US 45 north (Main Street)	Eastern end of US 45 concurrency
Fond du Lac	Fond du Lac				US 151 – Madison, Manitowoc	US 151 exit 168
Fond du Lac	Fond du Lac			—	CTH-K	Interchange
Fond du Lac	Empire			—	CTH-UU	Interchange
Fond du Lac	Forest			—	CTH-G	Interchange
Sheboygan	Town of Plymouth			—	CTH-C – Plymouth	Interchange
Sheboygan	Town of Plymouth			—	WIS 67 – Elkhart Lake, Plymouth	Interchange
Sheboygan	Plymouth			—	WIS 57 – Kiel, Plymouth	Interchange
Sheboygan	Town of Sheboygan Falls			—	WIS 32 – Howards Grove, Sheboygan Falls	Western end of freeway
Sheboygan	Kohler			—	CTH-Y – Kohler	
Sheboygan	Kohler			—	I-43 – Green Bay, Milwaukee	Cloverleaf interchange; I-43 exits 126A-B
Sheboygan	Sheboygan			—	CTH-TA (Taylor Drive)	Eastern end of freeway
Sheboygan	Sheboygan	211.05	339.65		WIS 28 west / WIS 42 north / LMCT (14th Street)	Eastern terminus; road continues as Erie Avenue
1.000 mi = 1.609 km; 1.000 km = 0.621 mi: Concurrency terminus; Incomplete access

== Business routes ==
=== Green Lake ===
Business State Trunk Highway 23
- Location: Green Lake
- Length: 2.4 mi (3.9 km)
- Existed: c. 1967–

Business State Trunk Highway 23 (Bus. WIS 23) in Green Lake follows the former alignment of WIS 23, after the highway was realigned in 1967.

=== Plymouth ===
Business State Trunk Highway 23
- Location: Plymouth
- Length: 4.3 mi (6.9 km)
- Existed: c. 1985–

Business State Trunk Highway 23 (Bus. WIS 23) in Plymouth follows the former alignment of WIS 23, after the highway was realigned in 1985.
