= Interstate 90 in Wisconsin =

Highway in Wisconsin

Interstate 90
- I-90 highlighted in red

Route information
- Maintained by WisDOT
- Length: 187.13 mi (301.16 km)
- NHS: Entire route

Major junctions
- West end: I-90 at the Minnesota state line near Onalaska
- US 53 in La Crosse; I-94 in Tomah; I-39 in Portage; US 51 in Madison; US 151 in Madison; I-94 in Madison; US 12 / US 18 in Madison; US 14 in Janesville; I-43 in Beloit
- East end: I-39 / I-90 at the Illinois state line in Beloit

Location
- Country: United States
- State: Wisconsin
- Counties: La Crosse, Monroe, Juneau, Sauk, Columbia, Dane, Rock

Highway system
- Interstate Highway System; Main; Auxiliary; Suffixed; Business; Future; Wisconsin State Trunk Highway System; Interstate; US; State; Scenic; Rustic
| ← WIS 89 | → WIS 91 |

Interstate 90 (I-90) runs east–west through the western, central and southern portions of the U.S. state of Wisconsin. About 187 miles (301 km) of I-90 lie in the state.

== Route description ==
The highway enters from Minnesota over the Mississippi River just northwest of La Crosse. The freeway passes north of La Crosse and south of Onalaska as it heads towards Tomah. Once there, it joins I-94. The two Interstates run concurrently for the next 91.76 miles (147.67 km) to Madison. The highway collects Interstate 39, 63 miles (101 km) southeast of Tomah (near Portage). This concurrency of about 30 miles (48 km) is one of only three triplex concurrencies of the Interstate Highway System existence, the other two being in both Milwaukee and Indianapolis. I-39 continues along I-90 for the remaining 78 miles (126 km) in Wisconsin.

I-94 breaks away eastward toward Milwaukee at what is commonly known as the Badger Interchange, where the three Interstates meet with WIS 30. The remaining routes continue south to Janesville and Beloit before exiting the state.

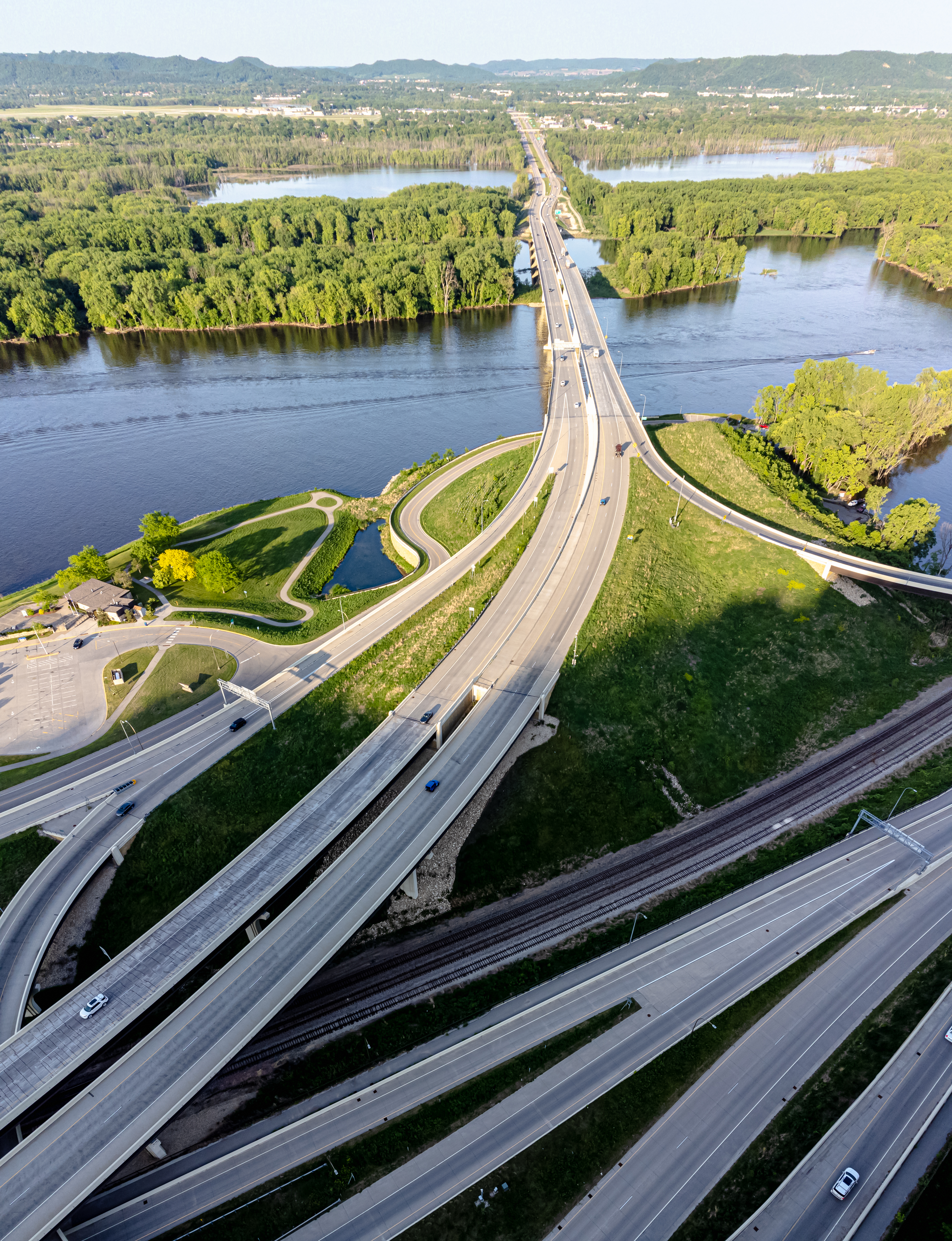
I-90 Mississippi River Bridge near La Crosse

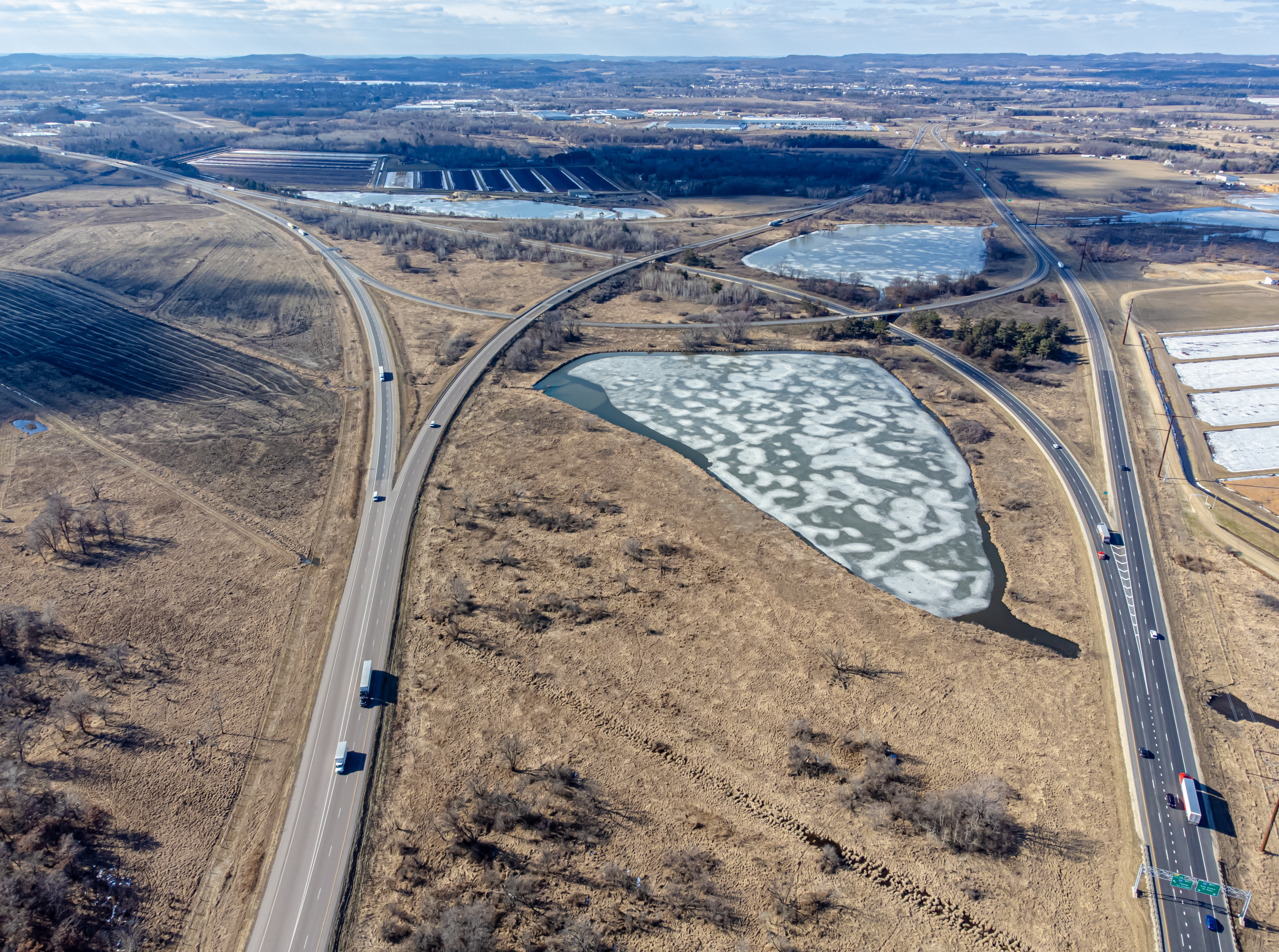
I-90 and I-94 junction near Tomah

== History ==
In 1959, I-90 was extended north from Rockton Road, the Northwest Tollway's (now Jane Addams Memorial Tollway's) northern terminus, in Illinois to US 14 near Janesville, Wisconsin. In 1961, another section of I-90 was opened. This section ran from US 12/US 18 (later moved slightly southward) near Madison to US 12/US 16 (now US 12/WIS 16) near Wisconsin Dells. In 1962, a connection between both opened sections opened to traffic. In 1964, I-90 was extended northwestward to US 12/US 16 (now US 12/WIS 16) near Tomah.

The Dresbach Bridge, spanning the Mississippi River west of La Crosse, was dedicated and opened to traffic on October 12, 1967. By 1969, another separate section of I-90 was opened, traveling from the Minnesota state line to US 16 (now WIS 16) near La Crosse. Later, both opened sections were then connected together.

The Dresbach Bridge was replaced by the states of Minnesota and Wisconsin in 2016 under the former's program to replace outdated bridge designs following the 2007 I-35W bridge collapse. The old bridge was closed in April 2016 and the new structure opened in October.

Starting in 2015, the 45-mile (72 km), southernmost section of I-39/I-90 (from US 12/US 18 to the Illinois state line) underwent a major reconstruction project. This involved widening the corridor to six lanes (eight lanes in the Janesville area) and reconfiguring all interchanges, including the I-43/WIS 81 interchange. The overall project was completed in 2021.

In the 2020s, the entire I-90 corridor was designated as an Alternative Fuel Corridor for electric vehicles.

== Exit list ==
| County | Location | mi | km | Exit | Destinations | Notes |
|---|---|---|---|---|---|---|
| Mississippi River | | 0.00 | 0.00 | | I-90 west – Rochester, Albert Lea | Continuation into Minnesota |
| Mississippi River | | 0.00 | 0.00 | I-90 Mississippi River Bridge | | |
| La Crosse | Town of Campbell | 1.96 | 3.15 | 2 | CTH-B – French Island | Access to La Crosse Regional Airport |
| La Crosse | La Crosse | 2.87 | 4.62 | 3 | US 53 south / WIS 35 (Alt. I-90) – La Crosse, Onalaska | Western end of US 53 concurrency |
| La Crosse | Onalaska | 4.43 | 7.13 | 4 | US 53 north / WIS 157 – La Crosse, Onalaska | Eastern end of US 53 concurrency |
| La Crosse | Onalaska | 5.74 | 9.24 | 5 | WIS 16 – Onalaska, West Salem | |
| La Crosse | Town of Hamilton | 11.78 | 18.96 | 12 | CTH-C – West Salem | |
| La Crosse | Bangor | 15.57 | 25.06 | 15 | WIS 162 – Bangor, Coon Valley | |
| Monroe | Sparta | 24.91 | 40.09 | 25 | WIS 27 – Sparta, Melvina | |
| Monroe | Town of Angelo | 28.18 | 45.35 | 28 | WIS 16 – Sparta | |
| Monroe | Town of Tomah | 41.42 | 66.66 | 41 | WIS 131 – Tomah, Wilton | |
| Monroe | Tomah | 43.32 | 69.72 | 43 | US 12 / WIS 16 – Tomah | |
| Monroe | Town of Oakdale | 45.10 | 72.58 | 45 | I-94 west – Eau Claire, St. Paul | Western end of I-94 concurrency; I-94 exit 147 |
| Monroe | Oakdale | 48.60 | 78.21 | 48 | CTH-PP – Oakdale | |
| Juneau | Camp Douglas | 55.03 | 88.56 | 55 | CTH-C – Camp Douglas, Volk Field | |
| Juneau | New Lisbon | 61.46 | 98.91 | 61 | WIS 80 – New Lisbon, Necedah | |
| Juneau | Town of Lemonweir | 69.02 | 111.08 | 69 | WIS 82 – Mauston, Oxford | |
| Juneau | Lyndon Station | 78.97 | 127.09 | 79 | CTH-HH – Lyndon Station; CTH-N | |
| Juneau | Town of Lyndon | 85.40 | 137.44 | 85 | US 12 / WIS 16 – Wisconsin Dells | |
| Sauk | Wisconsin Dells | 87.22 | 140.37 | 87 | WIS 13 north – Wisconsin Dells | |
| Sauk | Lake Delton | 89.80 | 144.52 | 89 | WIS 23 – Lake Delton, Reedsburg | |
| Sauk | Town of Delton | 93.13 | 149.88 | 92 | US 12 – Baraboo, Lake Delton | US 12 exit 211 |
| Columbia | Town of Caledonia | 105.73 | 170.16 | 106 | WIS 33 – Portage, Baraboo | |
| Columbia | Town of Caledonia | 108.16– 108.59 | 174.07– 174.76 | 108A | WIS 78 south – Merrimac | |
| Columbia | Town of Caledonia | 108.16– 108.59 | 174.07– 174.76 | 108B | I-39 north – Wausau | Western end of I-39 concurrency |
| Columbia | Town of Dekorra | 115.21 | 185.41 | 115 | CTH-CS / CTH-J – Poynette, Lake Wisconsin | |
| Columbia | Town of Arlington | 119.20 | 191.83 | 119 | WIS 60 – Lodi, Arlington | |
| Dane | Town of Vienna | 126.25 | 203.18 | 126 | CTH-V – Dane, DeForest | |
| Dane | Community of Windsor | 130.46 | 209.96 | 131 | WIS 19 – Waunakee, Sun Prairie | |
| Dane | Town of Burke | 131.98 | 212.40 | 132 | US 51 – Madison, DeForest | |
| Dane | Madison | 135.21– 135.24 | 217.60– 217.65 | 135 | US 151 – Madison, Sun Prairie | Signed as exits 135A (south, Madison) and 135B (north, Sun Prairie); US 151 exit 97 |
| Dane | Madison | 135.45 | 217.99 | 135C | High Crossing Boulevard | Westbound exit and eastbound entrance |
| Dane | Madison | 137.24 | 220.87 | 138A | I-94 east – Milwaukee | Eastern end of I-94 concurrency; left exit and entrance eastbound; I-94 exit 240 |
| Dane | Madison | 137.59 | 221.43 | 138B | WIS 30 west – Madison | Left exit and entrance westbound; serves Dane County Airport; WIS 30 exit 3 eastbound exit 240A westbound |
| Dane | Town of Blooming Grove | 141.43 | 227.61 | 142 | US 12 / US 18 – Madison, Cambridge | Signed as exits 142A (west) and 142B (east); US 12 exit 267 |
| Dane | Town of Pleasant Springs | 146.80 | 236.25 | 147 | CTH-N – Stoughton, Cottage Grove | |
| Dane | Town of Christiana | 155.90 | 250.90 | 156 | US 51 north to CTH-A – Stoughton, Deerfield | Western end of US 51 concurrency |
| Dane | Town of Albion | 159.64 | 256.92 | 160 | US 51 south – Edgerton WIS 73 north to WIS 106 – Deerfield | Eastern end of US 51 concurrency |
| Rock | Town of Fulton | 162.57 | 261.63 | 163 | WIS 59 – Edgerton, Milton | |
| Rock | Janesville | 170.81 | 274.89 | 171A | WIS 26 – Milton, Janesville | |
| Rock | Janesville | 171.52– 171.57 | 276.03– 276.12 | 171B | Alt. I-39 south / US 14 – Janesville, Delavan | Formerly split into exits 171B (west) and 171C (east) |
| Rock | Janesville | 174.71 | 281.17 | 175 | Alt. I-39 north / WIS 11 east (Racine Street) – Delavan | Western end of WIS 11 concurrency; former Bus. US 14; formerly exits 175A–B |
| Rock | Town of La Prairie | 177.22 | 285.21 | 177 | WIS 11 west – Janesville, Avalon | Eastern end of WIS 11 concurrency |
| Rock | Town of Turtle | 182.41 | 293.56 | 183 | CTH-S (Shopiere Road) – Beloit, Shopiere | |
| Rock | Beloit | 184.70 | 297.25 | 185A | WIS 81 – Beloit | |
| Rock | Beloit | 184.68 | 297.21 | 185B | I-43 north – Milwaukee | I-43 exit 0 |
| Rock | Beloit | 187.13 | 301.16 | | I-39 south / I-90 east – Rockford, Chicago | Continuation into Illinois |
1.000 mi = 1.609 km; 1.000 km = 0.621 mi: Concurrency terminus; Incomplete access

Interstate 90
| Previous state: Minnesota | Wisconsin | Next state: Illinois |
