= Wisconsin Highway 26 =

Highway in Wisconsin

State Trunk Highway 26
- WIS 26; mainline in red, business routes in blue

Route information
- Maintained by WisDOT
- Length: 98.15 mi (157.96 km)

Major junctions
- South end: US 51 in Janesville
- US 14 in Janesville; I-39 / I-90 in Janesville; US 12 in Fort Atkinson; US 18 in Jefferson; I-94 in Johnson Creek; US 151 in Waupun
- North end: I-41 / US 41 / CTH-N in Oshkosh

Location
- Country: United States
- State: Wisconsin
- Counties: Rock, Jefferson, Dodge, Fond du Lac, Winnebago

Highway system
- Wisconsin State Trunk Highway System; Interstate; US; State; Scenic; Rustic
← WIS 25	→ WIS 27

State Trunk Highway 26 (often called Highway 26, STH-26, or WIS 26) is a state highway in the U.S. state of Wisconsin. The route is partially a divided highway with a few freeway bypass sections for roughly 50 miles (80 km). The remaining sections of WIS 26 are a two-lane road. WIS 26 provides direct access from Janesville to Oshkosh via Fort Atkinson, Watertown, and Waupun.

== Route description ==
WIS 26 begins in downtown Janesville, Rock County at U.S. Highway 51 (US 51, North Parker Drive), and follows East Centerway Street, to turn northeast on Milton Ave. WIS 26 crosses US 14 and Interstate 39/Interstate 90 (I-39/I-90) on the northeast side of the city. WIS 26 is a divided highway with a few freeway bypass sections from Janesville to WIS 60 for about 50 miles (80 km). WIS 26 goes five miles (8.0 km) north of the I-39/I-90 before bypassing Milton to the east. WIS 59 crosses WIS 26 in Milton. WIS 26 crosses over to Jefferson County about five miles (8.0 km) north of Milton. The highway turns northeast at the county line and approaches Fort Atkinson, but turns northwestward prior to entering the city, and bypasses it to the west with four exits to serve Fort Atkinson. Direct access is provided to WIS 106 and US 12. WIS 89 crosses the route, but no direct access is provided. WIS 26 then continues north for two miles (3.2 km) to Jefferson, where WIS 26 bypasses the city to the west. It has three exits serving Jefferson including one at US 18. The highway passes through Johnson Creek at the interchange with I-94. About four miles (6.4 km) north of I-94, WIS 26 bypasses Watertown to the west as the highway crosses into Dodge County. The bypass has three exits serving Watertown including at WIS 19 and WIS 16.

On the Dodge County side of Watertown, WIS 26 and WIS 16 run concurrently for eight miles (13 km) to near Clyman where WIS 16 exits at WIS 60. WIS 26 goes into Juneau then crosses WIS 33 three miles (4.8 km) north of Juneau. After 11 more miles (18 km), WIS 26 crosses US 151 and passes through Waupun. WIS 26 joins US 151 and crosses into Fond du Lac County at its junction with WIS 49 in Waupun. WIS 26 joins US 151 for one mile (1.6 km) then turns north off the US Highway. After 10 miles (16 km), the highway crosses WIS 23 in Rosendale. The highway then angles northeastward over the remaining seven miles (11 km) before entering Winnebago County. Four more miles (6.4 km) into the county the highway terminates at its interchange with I-41/US 41 on the far southwest side of Oshkosh, about two miles (3.2 km) south of the Wittman Regional Airport, site of EAA AirVenture Oshkosh.

== History ==
The original 1917 alignment of WIS 26 mostly followed the current alignment south of Juneau, but the segment north of Juneau was directed towards Theresa. In 1921, WIS 26 was extended via Kewaskum and Waldo to end at Sheboygan—via present-day WIS 28. In 1924, the route was realigned. From Juneau, it followed its present alignment to present-day US 41 and into Oshkosh, then continued north from that point along present day WIS 76 up to Greenville, turning westward onto present-day WIS 15 there to continue to New London. From there, the route followed present-day US 45, passing through Clintonville, Wittenberg, Antigo and Eagle River. The route connected with then M-26. WIS 26 was also concurrent with WIS 10 south of Janesville. In 1934, US 45 debuted, which replaced WIS 26 from Oshkosh northward. The route was truncated on the southern end to end at Janesville in the late 1940s.

Four bypasses were constructed for WIS 26—around Milton to the east in 2013-14, around Fort Atkinson to the west in the 1990s, around Jefferson to the west in the 2000s, and around Watertown to the west in 2012-14. The highway was simultaneously widened to four lanes from Janesville to Watertown at an estimated cost of $433 million. Research from WisPIRG brought in to question the wastefulness of the project. For instance, WisDOT had projected 85% to 300% higher traffic volumes by 2028, yet actual traffic counts revealed traffic volumes far lower than predicted.

== Major intersections ==
County	Location	mi	km	Exit	Destinations	Notes
Rock	Janesville	0.0	0.0		US 51 – Beloit, Madison	
Rock	Janesville	2.9	4.7		US 14 – Evansville, Delavan	
Rock	Janesville	3.3	5.3		I-39 / I-90 – Madison, Beloit	Exit 171A on I-39/I-90
Rock	Milton	3.3	5.3	6	Harmony Town Hall Road	
Rock	Milton	8.1	13.0	8	WIS 59 / CTH-M – Whitewater, Milton	
Rock	Milton	11.9	19.2	11	CTH-N	
Jefferson	Fort Atkinson	17.4	28.0	17	Bus. WIS 26 – Fort Atkinson	
Jefferson	Fort Atkinson	19.5	31.4	19	WIS 106 – Fort Atkinson	
Jefferson	Fort Atkinson	21.3	34.3	21	US 12 – Madison, Fort Atkinson	
Jefferson	Fort Atkinson	23.4	37.7	23	Bus. WIS 26 – Fort Atkinson	
Jefferson	Jefferson	25.1	40.4	25	Bus. WIS 26 to WIS 89 – Jefferson	
Jefferson	Jefferson	27.3	43.9	27	US 18 – Cambridge, Jefferson	
Jefferson	Jefferson	30.0	48.3	30	Bus. WIS 26 – Jefferson	
Jefferson	Johnson Creek	34.4	55.4		I-94 – Milwaukee, Madison	Exit 267 on I-94
Jefferson	Watertown	39.5	63.6	39	Bus. WIS 26 / CTH-Y – Watertown	
Jefferson	Watertown	43.1	69.4	43	WIS 19 – Watertown	
Dodge	Watertown	45.0	72.4	45	WIS 16 east / Bus. WIS 26 – Watertown, Oconomowoc	Southern end of WIS 16 concurrency
Dodge	Clyman	52.8	85.0	52	WIS 16 west / WIS 60 – Columbus, Hustisford	Northern end of WIS 16 concurrency
Dodge	Juneau	62.7	100.9		WIS 33 – Beaver Dam, Horicon	
Dodge	Waupun	73.2	117.8		US 151 – Beaver Dam, Fond du Lac	
Dodge	Waupun	75.3	121.2		WIS 49 (Main Street)	
Fond du Lac	Waupun	76.8	123.6	147	US 151 south – Madison	Southbound exit and northbound entrance; southern end of US 151 concurrency
Fond du Lac	Waupun	78.1	125.7	148	US 151 north – Fond du Lac	Northern end of US 151 concurrency
Fond du Lac	Rosendale	88.6	142.6		WIS 23 (Division Street)	
Winnebago	Oshkosh	99.8	160.6		I-41 / US 41 – Green Bay, Fond du Lac	Northern terminus; exit 113 on I-41
1.000 mi = 1.609 km; 1.000 km = 0.621 mi: Concurrency terminus; Incomplete access

== Special routes ==
=== Fort Atkinson business loop ===
Business State Trunk Highway 26
- Location: Fort Atkinson
- Length: 5.78 mi (9.30 km)

Business WIS 26 in Fort Atkinson starts at WIS 26 Exit 17 and follows Janesville Ave., Robert St., Madison Ave., North 3rd St., and N. High St. before ending at WIS 26 Exit 23.

=== Jefferson business loop ===
Business State Trunk Highway 26
- Location: Jefferson
- Length: 4.4 mi (7.1 km)

Business WIS 26 in Jefferson starts at WIS 26 Exit 25 and follows the old routing of WIS 26 along Main St before ending at WIS 26 Exit 30.

=== Watertown business loop ===
Business State Trunk Highway 26
- Location: Watertown
- Length: 5.4 mi (8.7 km)

Business WIS 26 in Watertown starts at WIS 26 Exit 39 and follows the old routing of WIS 26 along Church St. to Wisconsin 16. It then turns west with WIS 16 for a short distance before ending at WIS 26 Exit 45. Old WIS 26 north of WIS 16 is now County Hwy L.

=== Milton business loop ===
Business State Trunk Highway 26
- Location: Milton
