= Wisconsin Highway 73 =

Highway in Wisconsin

State Trunk Highway 73
- WIS 73 highlighted in red

Route information
- Maintained by WisDOT
- Length: 265.78 mi (427.73 km)

Major junctions
- South end: I-39 / I-90 / US 51 near Edgerton
- US 12 / US 18 near Deerfield; I-94 in Deerfield; WIS 19 in Marshall; US 151 near Columbus; I-39 / US 51 near Plainfield; WIS 80 in Pittsville; WIS 95 near Neillsville; US 10 in Neillsville; WIS 29 / CTH-T near Withee; WIS 64 near Gilman
- North end: US 8 near Ingram

Location
- Country: United States
- State: Wisconsin
- Counties: Dane, Columbia, Dodge, Green Lake, Marquette, Waushara, Adams, Portage, Wood, Clark, Taylor, Rusk

Highway system
- Wisconsin State Trunk Highway System; Interstate; US; State; Scenic; Rustic
← WIS 72	→ WIS 74

State Trunk Highway 73 (often called Highway 73, STH-73 or WIS 73) is a 265.84-mile (427.83 km) state highway in the central part of the US state of Wisconsin that runs mostly north–south from Ingram to near Edgerton. The exception is in Wood and Adams counties, where this highway runs east–west. It is one of the longer Wisconsin state highways.

== Route description ==
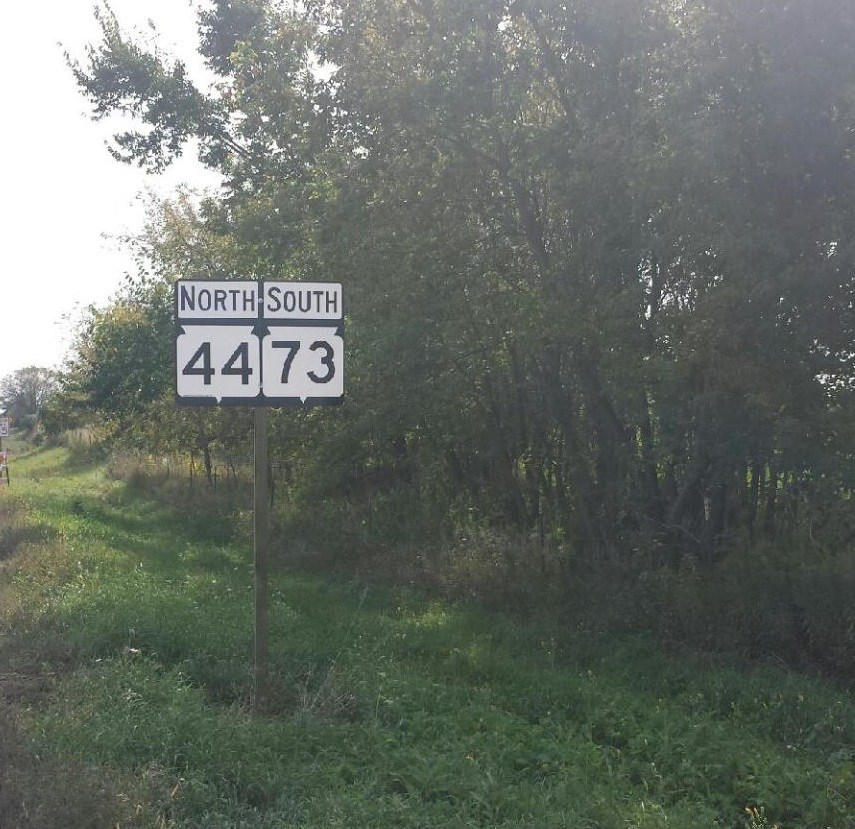
A wrong-way concurrency of WIS 44/WIS 73, just west of Manchester; actual direction of travel is east.

WIS 73 starts in Dane County at an interchange with Interstate 39 (I-39), I-90 and US Highway 51 (US 51) north of the city of Edgerton. Also near this junction, WIS 106 meets WIS 73 east of Albion. WIS 73 heads north nine miles (14 km) where it meets US 12 and US 18. WIS 73 continues north and heads one mile (1.6 km) to Deerfield. About four miles (6.4 km) north of Deerfield, it meets I-94 at exit 250, and continues north another four miles (6.4 km) to Marshall where it briefly runs concurrently with WIS 19.

It continues north about 10 miles (16 km) to the city of Columbus. Just before it goes under an overpass for US 151, it crosses into Columbia County. WIS 73 crosses US 151, WIS 89, WIS 16, WIS 60 and US 151 again, in that order, as it travels northeast through Columbus on Park Avenue and Ludington Street. It also crosses into Dodge County just after WIS 16/WIS 60.

WIS 73 then continues north for 13 miles (21 km) to Randolph. Just north of town, it crosses WIS 33. WIS 73 will continue to go back and forth between both sides of Columbia–Dodge county line until it crosses into Green Lake County at County Trunk Highway AW (CTH-AW), five miles (8.0 km) north of WIS 33. WIS 73 continues to head north for four miles (6.4 km) to a junction with WIS 44. The two routes head west, forming a wrong-way concurrency through the unincorporated town of Manchester for two miles (3.2 km) before WIS 44 splits off to head to Kingston.

WIS 73 heads north another 10 miles (16 km) to a junction with WIS 23, three miles (4.8 km) east of Princeton. WIS 23/WIS 73 overlaps to Princeton using Fulton Street and Main Street before WIS 23 splits southwest to Montello. WIS 73 then heads north-northwest, crossing into Marquette County at Eagle Road, to Neshkoro. WIS 73 will then cross into Waushara County just north of CTH-E, north of Neshkoro. WIS 73 continues north-northwest six miles (9.7 km) to Wautoma, where it meets WIS 21. WIS 21/WIS 73 runs concurrently through downtown before WIS 21 splits off to head to Necedah.

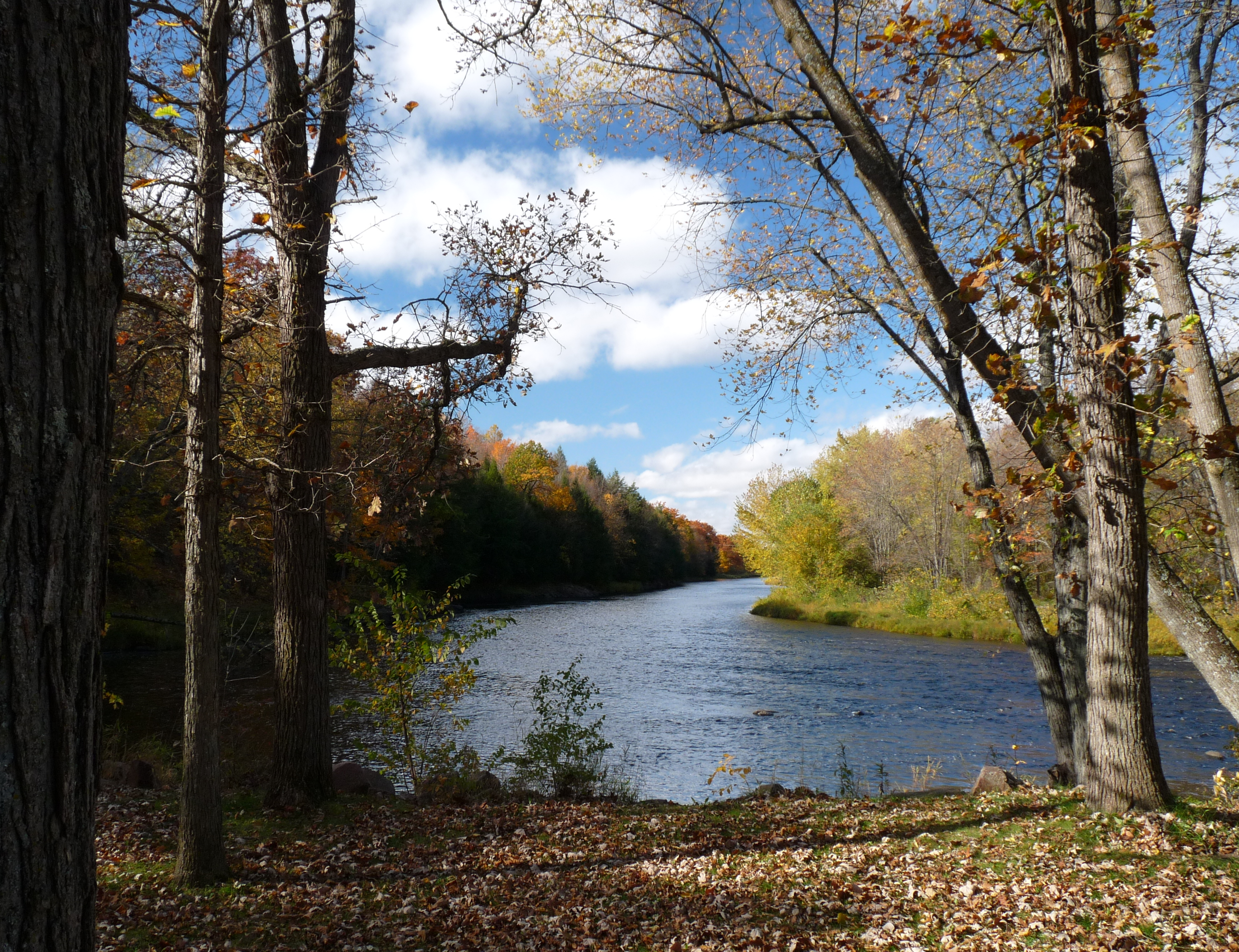
Looking downstream from the wayside where the highway crosses the Jump River

WIS 73 heads northwest for about 15 miles (24 km) to Plainfield where WIS 73 crosses I-39 (exit 136) and US 51 west of town. It continues heading west, crossing into Adams County at CTH-D. WIS 73 straddles the Adams-Portage county line for about four miles (6.4 km). It then enters Wood County before WIS 73 continues west-northwest to WIS 13, where it briefly runs concurrently with WIS 13. WIS 73 continues west for four miles (6.4 km) to the Wisconsin River where it enters the city of Nekoosa. In Nekoosa, WIS 73 has a junction with WIS 173. WIS 73 follows roughly along the west bank of the Wisconsin River into Port Edwards, where it meets with WIS 54. WIS 54 is cosigned with WIS 73 along the west bank of the Wisconsin River as they enter Wisconsin Rapids's southwest side.

At Riverview Expressway, they meet with WIS 13. WIS 54 heads to Plover while WIS 73 and WIS 13 are cosigned briefly before they split at WIS 34 (4th Avenue) and Grand Avenue. WIS 73 heads west-northwest out of town. It crosses WIS 186. WIS 73 meets WIS 80 in Pittsville where WIS 73/WIS 80 overlap for about two miles (3.2 km) before WIS 80 heads north to Marshfield.

WIS 73 heads west seven miles (11 km) to where it crosses into Clark County. It continues west about 17 miles (27 km) to WIS 95 before it turns north and enters Neillsville where it has a one-block overlap with US 10 before heading north out of town. WIS 73 heads north to Greenwood and Withee. Just before Withee, WIS 73 meets with the WIS 29 expressway, overlaps with it for about 10 miles (16 km) to Thorp, where WIS 73 exits and heads north once again. It crosses into Taylor County about five miles (8.0 km) north of WIS 29.

It goes north another seven miles to WIS 64. They are cosigned heading north before WIS 64 splits just east of Gilman. WIS 73 continues north to Jump River before entering Rusk County. It continues north for nine miles (14 km) to Ingram, where WIS 73 ends at US 8.

== Major intersections ==
County	Location	mi	km	Destinations	Notes
Dane	Town of Albion	0.00	0.00	I-39 / I-90 / US 51 north – Madison, Janesville US 51 south – Edgerton	Southern terminus; road continues south as US 51
Dane	Town of Albion	1.06	1.71	WIS 106 east – Fort Atkinson	Western terminus of WIS 106
Dane	Town of Deerfield	11.10	17.86	US 12 / US 18 – Madison, Cambridge	Interchange
Dane	Town of Medina	16.88– 16.90	27.17– 27.20	I-94 – Madison, Milwaukee	Exit 250 on I-94
Dane	Marshall	21.19	34.10	WIS 19 west (Main Street)	Western end of WIS 19 concurrency
Dane	Marshall	21.35	34.36	WIS 19 east (Main Street)	Eastern end of WIS 19 concurrency
Columbia	Town of Columbus	33.71– 33.77	54.25– 54.35	US 151 – Beaver Dam, Madison Bus. US 151 north	Southern end of Bus. US 151 concurrency; diamond interchange; exit 115 on US 151;
Columbia	Columbus	35.43	57.02	WIS 89 south (Farnham Street)	Northern terminus of WIS 89
Columbia	Columbus	35.87	57.73	WIS 16 / WIS 60 (James Street)	
Dodge	Town of Elba	37.54– 37.59	60.41– 60.50	US 151 – Madison, Beaver Dam Bus. US 151 south	Northern end of Bus. US 151 concurrency; diamond interchange; exit 120 on US 151
Columbia–Dodge county line	Randolph–Fox Lake town line	52.00	83.69	WIS 33 – Portage, Fox Lake	
Green Lake	Town of Manchester	61.82	99.49	WIS 44 north – Markesan	Eastern end of WIS 44 concurrency
Green Lake	Town of Manchester	63.26	101.81	WIS 44 south – Kingston	Western end of WIS 44 concurrency
Green Lake	Town of Princeton	73.18	117.77	WIS 23 east – Green Lake	Eastern end of WIS 23 concurrency
Green Lake	Princeton	75.67	121.78	CTH-D	Southern end of CTH-D concurrency
Green Lake	Princeton	76.11	122.49	CTH-J	Eastern end of CTH-J concurrency
Green Lake	Princeton	76.82	123.63	CTH-D	Northern end of CTH-D concurrency
Green Lake	Princeton	76.89	123.74	WIS 23 west – Montello	Western end of WIS 23 concurrency
Green Lake	Town of Princeton	77.29	124.39	CTH-J	Western end of CTH-J concurrency
Marquette	Neshkoro	85.84	138.15	CTH-E / CTH-N	Southern end of CTH-E/CTH-N concurrency
Marquette	Town of Neshkoro	86.97	139.96	CTH-E / CTH-N	Northern end of CTH-E/CTH-N concurrency
Waushara	Town of Dakota	93.34	150.22	WIS 21 east – Redgranite	Eastern end of WIS 21 concurrency
Waushara	Wautoma	95.02	152.92	WIS 152 east – Mount Morris	Western terminus of WIS 152
Waushara	Wautoma	95.85	154.26	WIS 22 north – Wild Rose, Waupaca	Eastern end of WIS 22 concurrency
Waushara	Wautoma	96.98	156.07	WIS 21 west / WIS 22 south – Coloma, Montello	Western end of WIS 21/WIS 22 concurrency
Waushara	Town of Plainfield	113.60– 113.62	182.82– 182.85	I-39 / US 51 – Portage, Stevens Point	Exit 136 on I-39/US 51
Adams	No major junctions				
Portage	No major junctions				
Wood	Town of Saratoga	129.48	208.38	WIS 13 – Friendship, Wisconsin Rapids	
Wood	Town of Saratoga	131.17	211.10	CTH-Z north	Eastern end of CHT-Z concurrency
Wood	Town of Saratoga	133.14	214.27	CTH-Z south	Western end of CHT-Z concurrency
Wood	Nekoosa	133.65	215.09	WIS 173 south – Babcock	Northern terminus of WIS 173
Wood	Port Edwards	135.74	218.45	WIS 54 west – Black River Falls	Western end of WIS 54 concurrency
Wood	Wisconsin Rapids	140.55	226.19	WIS 13 south WIS 54 east	Eastern end of WIS 54 concurrency; southern end of WIS 13 concurrency
Wood	Wisconsin Rapids	141.36	227.50	WIS 13 north WIS 34 north	Northern end of WIS 13 concurrency; southern terminus of WIS 34
Wood	Sigel–Hansen town line	149.07	239.90	WIS 186 north – Vesper	Southern terminus of WIS 186
Wood	Wood–Pittsville city line	157.44	253.38	WIS 80 south – Pittsville	Eastern end of WIS 80 concurrency
Wood	Town of Wood	159.82	257.21	WIS 80 north – Marshfield	Western end of WIS 80 concurrency
Wood	Town of Cary	161.34	259.65	CTH-B south	Eastern end of CTH-B concurrency
Wood	Town of Cary	161.84	260.46	CTH-B north	Western end of CTH-B concurrency
Wood	Town of Cary	163.83	263.66	CTH-V south	Eastern end of CTH-V concurrency
Wood	Town of Cary	164.83	265.27	CTH-V north	Western end of CTH-V concurrency
Clark	Town of Pine Valley	183.18	294.80	WIS 95 west – Merrillan	Southern end of WIS 95 concurrency
Clark	Neillsville	188.0	302.6	US 10 west – Fairchild WIS 95 west	Northern end of WIS 95 concurrency; western end of US 10 concurrency; eastern terminus of WIS 95
Clark	Neillsville	188.10	302.72	US 10 east – Marshfield Bus. US 10 west	Eastern end of US 10 concurrency; souther end of Bus. US 10 concurrency
Clark	Neillsville	186.73	300.51	Bus. US 10 west / CTH-B west	Northern end of Bus. US 10 concurrency
Clark	Town of Eaton	199.60	321.23	WIS 98 east – Loyal	Western terminus of WIS 98
Clark	Town of Longwood	210.08	338.09	CTH-N east	Southern end of CTH-N concurrency
Clark	Town of Longwood	212.09	341.33	CTH-N west	Northern end of CTH-N concurrency
Clark	Town of Longwood	214.06	344.50	WIS 29 east – Wausau	Eastern end of WIS 29 concurrency; interchange
Clark	Thorp	223.83	360.22	WIS 29 west – Chippewa Falls	Western end of WIS 29 concurrency; interchange
Taylor	Town of Ford	236.43	380.50	WIS 64 east – Medford	Southern end of WIS 64 concurrency
Taylor	Town of Ford	239.70	385.76	WIS 64 west – Gilman	Northern end of WIS 64 concurrency
Taylor	Town of Jump River	252.72	406.71	CTH-D east	Eastern end of CTH-D concurrency
Taylor	Town of Jump River	254.43	409.47	CTH-D west (Old 194)	Western end of CTH-D concurrency
Rusk	Town of Richland	265.78	427.73	US 8 – Ladysmith, Prentice	Northern terminus
1.000 mi = 1.609 km; 1.000 km = 0.621 mi: Concurrency terminus
