= Wisconsin Highway 19 =

Highway in Wisconsin

State Trunk Highway 19
- WIS 19 highlighted in red

Route information
- Maintained by WisDOT
- Length: 59.37 mi (95.55 km)

Major junctions
- West end: US 14 / WIS 78 in Mazomanie
- US 12 in Springfield Corners; I-39 / I-90 / I-94 in Madison; US 51 in Madison; US 151 in Sun Prairie
- East end: WIS 16 in Watertown

Location
- Country: United States
- State: Wisconsin
- Counties: Dane, Dodge, Jefferson

Highway system
- Wisconsin State Trunk Highway System; Interstate; US; State; Scenic; Rustic
| ← WIS 18 | → WIS 20 |

State Trunk Highway 19 (often called Highway 19, STH-19 or WIS 19) is a state highway in the U.S. state of Wisconsin. It provides a more direct route from U.S. Highway 14 near Mazomanie east to Highway 16 at Watertown, passing around the north side of Madison. WIS 19 is a local connector route that links the communities of Waunakee, Sun Prairie and Watertown. The highway follows two lane surface road for the entire length with the exception of urban multilane arterials.

== Route description ==
WIS 19 begins at Mazomanie at the junction of US 14 and WIS 78. It follows WIS 78 north for about a mile before turning east. It passes through the small communities of Marxville and Springfield Corners, and turns east to follow US 12 through Springfield Corners, a concurrency of about one mile (1.6 km). WIS 19 enters Waunakee about five miles (8.0 km) east of US 12. WIS 113 joins the highway from the north for about three miles (4.8 km), then turns south off WIS 19. WIS 19 reaches its junction with I-39, I-90 and I-94 on the south side of Windsor and its junction with US 51 one mile (1.6 km) east of the Interstates. In Sun Prairie, WIS 19 crosses US 151 and passes through the city. The highway then continues east, junctioning with WIS 73 in Marshall, just two miles (3.2 km) west of the Jefferson County line WIS 19 briefly passes through Jefferson County while passing through Waterloo before turning north to Dodge County. WIS 19 intersects WIS 89 while in Waterloo. About three miles (5 km) of WIS is in rural Dodge County. The route passes back into Jefferson County to pass through Hubbleton, then it straddles the county line into Watertown. In Watertown, WIS 19 turns southeastward back into Jefferson County, and crosses the WIS 26 bypass on the western fringes of the city. WIS 19 merges with and ends at WIS 16.

== History ==
Prior to 1947, WIS 19 followed the current route of US 18 between Bridgeport and Madison. The route then passed through downtown Madison and followed then WIS 31 (part of the current US 151) to Sun Prairie. East of Sun Prairie the route followed its present-day alignment to Watertown. The route then followed present-day WIS 16 to Waukesha and east from there along present-day WIS 59 into Milwaukee. When the U.S. Highway system was implemented, WIS 19's western terminus was relocated to Madison. The portion between Madison and Sun Prairie remained despite the debut of US 151 as did the eastern portion that became concurrent with US 16. In 1947, the eastern terminus was moved to Watertown, the section along US 151 was removed, and the portion between Mazomanie and Sun Prairie was implemented.

The Part of WIS 19 roughly from the Interstates west to WIS 113 had at one time been on the corridor of a planned beltine route around the north side of Madison. The current status of the parkway is uncertain.

== Major intersections ==
| County | Location | mi | km | Destinations | Notes |
|---|---|---|---|---|---|
| Dane | Mazomanie | 0.00 | 0.00 | US 14 / WIS 78 south – Mazomanie, Black Earth, Mount Horeb | Western end of WIS 78 concurrency |
| Dane | Mazomanie | 1.39 | 2.24 | WIS 78 north – Sauk City | Eastern end of WIS 78 concurrency |
| Dane | Springfield Corners | 11.01 | 17.72 | US 12 – Sauk City, Madison | |
| Dane | Waunakee | 17.42 | 28.03 | WIS 113 north – Lodi | Western end of WIS 113 concurrency |
| Dane | Waunakee | 19.95 | 32.11 | WIS 113 south – Madison | Eastern end of WIS 113 concurrency |
| Dane | DeForest | 23.46 | 37.76 | I-39 / I-90 / I-94 – Wis Dells, Janesville, Milwaukee | |
| Dane | DeForest | 24.47 | 39.38 | US 51 – Portage, Madison | |
| Dane | Sun Prairie | 29.20 | 46.99 | US 151 – Columbus, Madison | |
| Dane | Sun Prairie | 30.25 | 48.68 | CTH-N | |
| Dane | Marshall | 36.13 | 58.15 | CTH-TT | |
| Dane | Marshall | 38.43 | 61.85 | CTH-T | Terminus of CTH-T |
| Dane | Marshall | 38.55 | 62.04 | WIS 73 – Columbus, Deerfield | |
| Jefferson | Waterloo | 42.87 | 68.99 | WIS 89 – Columbus, Lake Mills | |
| Jefferson | Waterloo | 42.97 | 69.15 | CTH-O | Terminus of CTH-O |
| Dodge | Waterloo | 44.28 | 71.26 | CTH-I | Terminus of CTH-I |
| Dodge | Hubbleton | 49.30 | 79.34 | CTH-G | Terminus of CTH-G |
| Jefferson | Watertown | 50.33 | 81.00 | CTH-QQ | |
| Jefferson | Watertown | 59.37 | 95.55 | WIS 16 east / Bus. WIS 16 – Oconomowoc | |
1.000 mi = 1.609 km; 1.000 km = 0.621 mi: Concurrency terminus
