= Wisconsin Highway 89 =

Highway in Wisconsin

State Trunk Highway 89
- WIS 89 highlighted in red

Route information
- Maintained by WisDOT
- Length: 55.8 mi (89.8 km)

Major junctions
- South end: US 14 / WIS 11 west of Darien
- US 12 / WIS 59 in Whitewater; US 12 in Fort Atkinson; US 18 in Jefferson; I-94 in Lake Mills
- North end: Bus. US 151 / WIS 73 in Columbus

Location
- Country: United States
- State: Wisconsin
- Counties: Walworth, Rock, Jefferson, Dodge, Dane, Columbia

Highway system
- Wisconsin State Trunk Highway System; Interstate; US; State; Scenic; Rustic
← WIS 88	→ I-90

State Trunk Highway 89 (often called Highway 89, STH-89 or WIS 89) is a 72-mile (116 km) state highway in the southeastern part of the U.S. state of Wisconsin. It travels south to north from near Delavan to Columbus.

== Route description ==
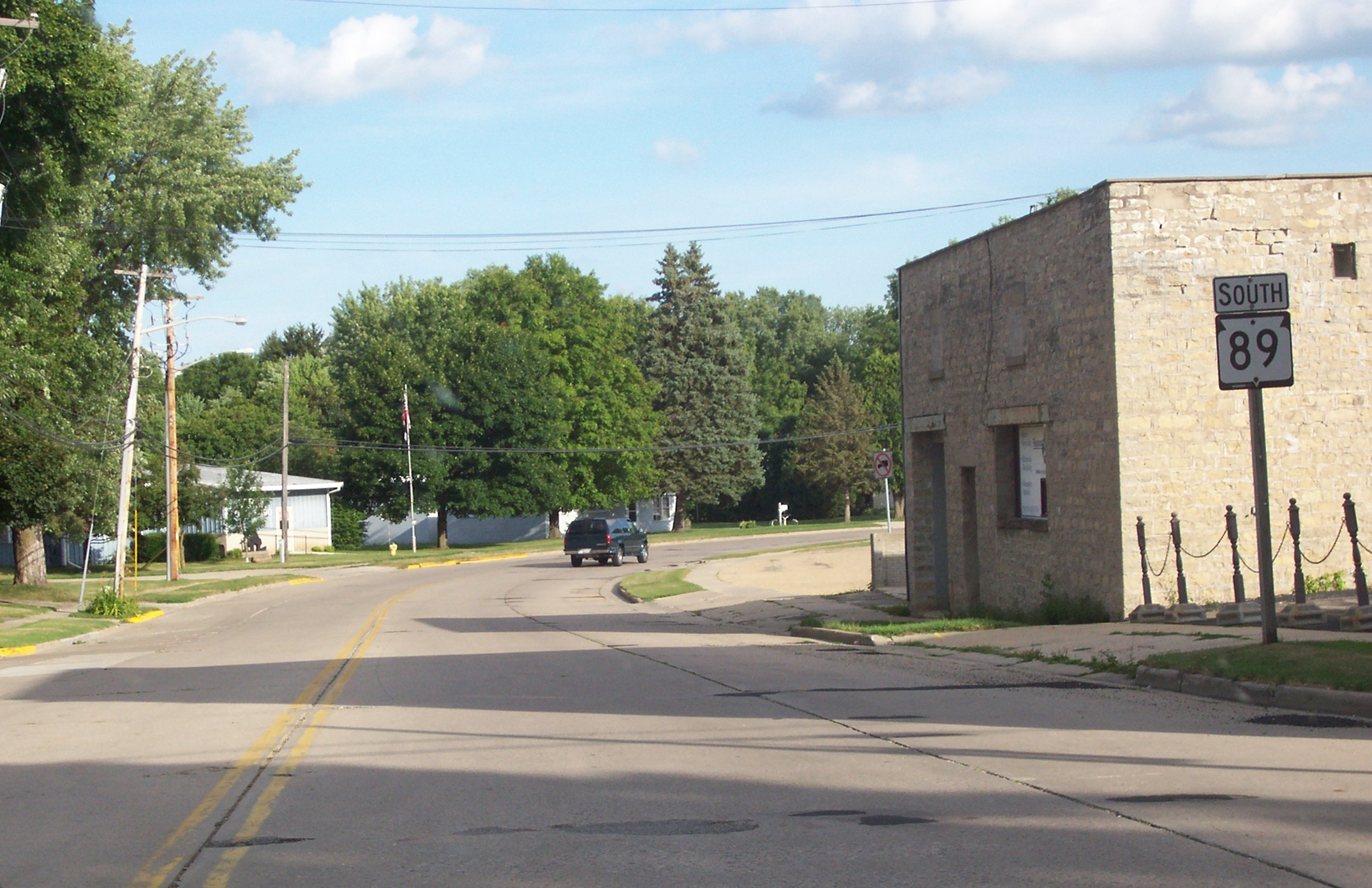
Northern terminus

Starting at US 14/WIS 11 west of Delevan, WIS 89 traveled northward. Going northward, it then passes Richmond. Further northward, it then meets US 12 and WIS 59 south of Whitewater. At this point, WIS 89 runs concurrently north with US 12. In Fort Atkinson, WIS 106 intersects the concurrency. One block north of the intersection, the concurrency intersects WIS 26 Business. At this point, US 12 turns west along WIS 26 Business while WIS 89 continues north. Further north, it then crosses over WIS 26 without an interchange. At this point, the route largely parallels the WIS 26 freeway before meeting US 18 west of Jefferson. West of Jefferson, WIS 89 briefly travels west along US 18. At this point, WIS 89 travels largely in a north-northwest direction. In Lake Mills, it meets I-94 at a four-ramp parclo. In Waterloo, it then briefly runs concurrently with WIS 19 before WIS 89 turns north. Going further north into Columbus, WIS 89 ends at the WIS 73 intersection.

== History ==
Initially, in 1919, WIS 89 traveled north along present-day US 14 and WIS 89 itself from IL 23 (part of it is now US 14) at the Illinois state line to WIS 12 (later US 12, now Bus. US 12) in Whitewater. In 1924, WIS 89 was extended northward to Waterloo via WIS 12 (now US 12), WIS 26, and WIS 107. Only WIS 107 was removed in favor of WIS 89 south of Waterloo and turning the section north of Waterloo to local control.

In 1933, US 14 was extended east from Winona, Minnesota to Chicago, Illinois. This extension included a southernmost portion of WIS 89 south of WIS 11. However, US 14 did not supersede that portion of WIS 89. As a result, both routes run concurrently with each other in one section. In 1947, US 14 superseded WIS 89, resulting in WIS 89 being removed from the state line to the US 14/WIS 11 junction. Also, WIS 89 extended north to Columbus, superseding CTH-C (former portion of WIS 107) in the process.

In 1991, WIS 89 was moved westward from WIS 26, superseding CTH-Q and bypassing Jefferson in the process. In 2005, WIS 89 moved away from downtown Whitewater to a bypass that avoids the downtown area. As a result, half of the former segment turned to local control while half turned to Bus. US 12.

== Major intersections ==
County	Location	mi	km	Destinations	Notes
Walworth	Town of Darien			US 14 west / WIS 11 – Delavan, Janesville US 14 east – Darien	Roadway continues as eastbound US 14
Walworth	Whitewater			US 12 east / WIS 59 east – Elkhorn WIS 59 west – Whitewater	Eastern end of US 12 overlap; roadway continues as westbound WIS 59
Rock	No major junctions				
Jefferson	Fort Atkinson			Bus. WIS 26 south (Milwaukee Avenue)	Southern end of Business WIS 26 overlap
Jefferson	Fort Atkinson			WIS 106 (Sherman Avenue)	
Jefferson	Fort Atkinson			US 12 west (Madison Avenue) / Bus. WIS 26 north (N. 3rd Street)	Northern end of US 12 and Business WIS 26 overlaps
Jefferson	Town of Jefferson			US 18 east – Jefferson	Eastern end of US 18 overlap
Jefferson	Town of Jefferson			US 18 west – Cambridge	Western end of US 18 overlap
Jefferson	Lake Mills			I-94 – Madison, Milwaukee	
Jefferson	Waterloo			WIS 19 east (Portland Road)	Eastern end of WIS 19 overlap
Jefferson	Waterloo			WIS 19 west (W. Madison Street)	Western end of WIS 19 overlap
Dodge	No major junctions				
Dane	No major junctions				
Columbia	Columbus			Bus. US 151 / WIS 73 (Park Avenue) to WIS 16	
1.000 mi = 1.609 km; 1.000 km = 0.621 mi: Concurrency terminus
