= Wisconsin Highway 16 =

Highway in Wisconsin

State Trunk Highway 16
- WIS 16 highlighted in red

Route information
- Maintained by WisDOT
- Length: 193.2 mi (310.9 km)

Major junctions
- West end: US 14 / US 61 / MN 16 in La Crosse
- US 14 / US 53 / US 61 in La Crosse; I-90 in La Crosse; I-90 in Sparta; US 12 / WIS 131 in Tomah; I-90 in Tomah; I-90 / I-94 in Wisconsin Dells; US 12 / WIS 13 / WIS 23 in Wisconsin Dells; I-39 / WIS 127 in Portage; US 51 in Portage; US 151 / WIS 60 in Columbus
- East end: I-94 in Waukesha

Location
- Country: United States
- State: Wisconsin
- Counties: La Crosse, Monroe, Juneau, Sauk, Columbia, Dodge, Jefferson, Waukesha

Highway system
- Wisconsin State Trunk Highway System; Interstate; US; State; Scenic; Rustic
← WIS 15	→ WIS 17

State Trunk Highway 16 (often called Highway 16, STH-16 or WIS 16) is a Wisconsin state highway running from Pewaukee across the state to La Crosse. Much of its route in the state parallels the former mainline of the Milwaukee Road and current mainline of the Canadian Pacific Railway. Interstate 90 (I-90) or I-94 parallels Highway 16 for most of its length in the state. It serves local traffic in nearby cities including La Crosse, Tomah, Wisconsin Dells, Portage, Columbus, Watertown, Oconomowoc and Waukesha. The highway is mainly two-lane surface road or urban multi-lane expressway from La Crosse to Oconomowoc, and it is a freeway east of Oconomowoc.

== Route description ==
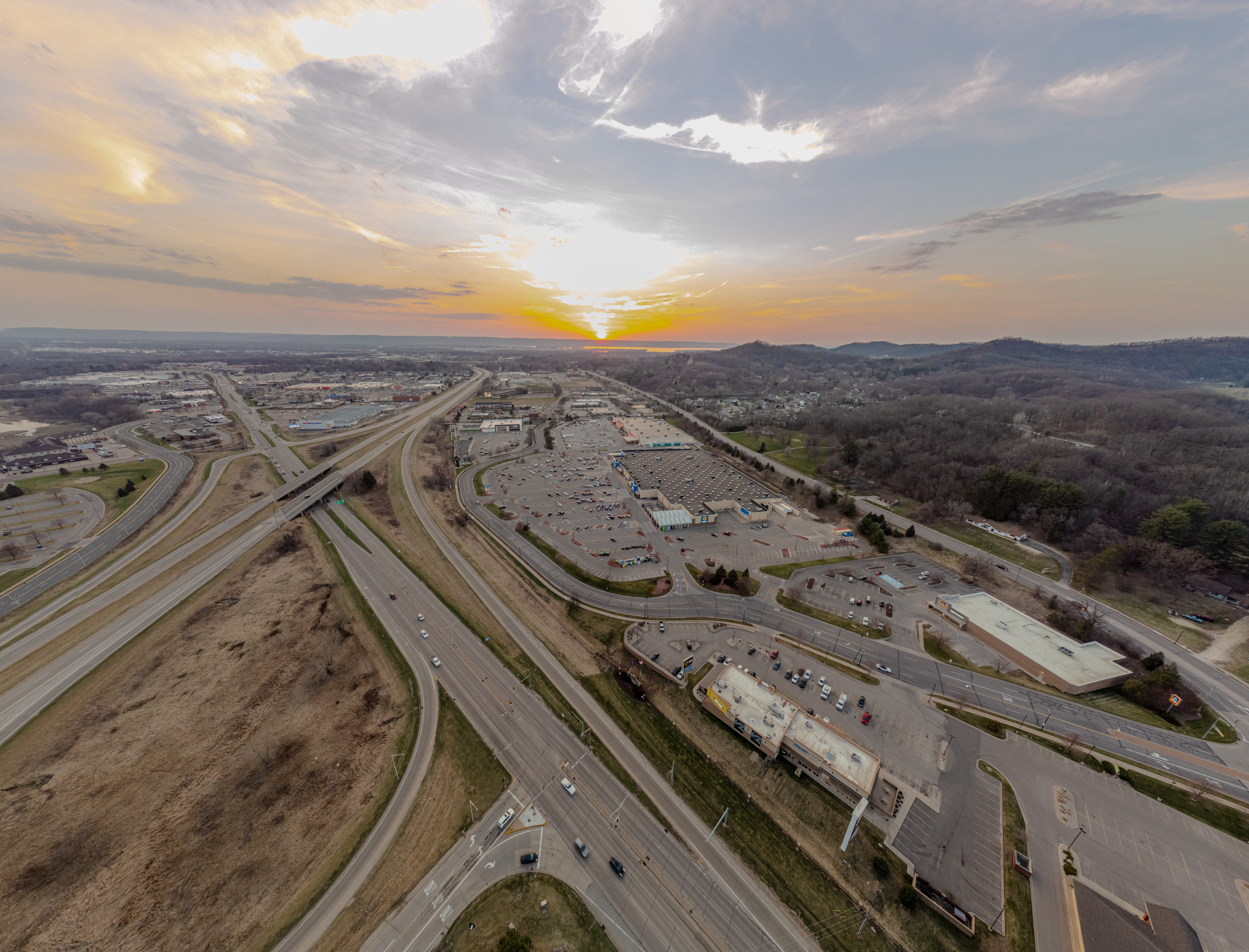
WIS 16 passing through Onalaska

WIS 16 enters from Minnesota via a connection with Trunk Highway 16 on the Mississippi River, running concurrently with US Highway 14 (US 14) and US 61. After the two US Highways turn south to follow 3rd Street in downtown La Crosse, WIS 16 passes through La Crosse via Cass Street, 7th Street and La Crosse Street, crossing WIS 35 at La Crosse Street and Lang Drive. WIS 16 passes the northern edge of the University of Wisconsin–La Crosse campus, then turns north at Losey Boulevard.

The route then turns northeastward and junctions with I-90 six miles (9.7 km) northeast of the city. WIS 16 becomes a parallel route to I-90 and passes through West Salem where it connects with WIS 108. Wisconsin Highway 162 junctions just north of Bangor. WIS 16 crosses into Monroe County in Rockland. WIS 16 enters Sparta and junctions with WIS 21, WIS 27, and WIS 71. WIS 16 provides access to the Elroy-Sparta State Bike Trail.

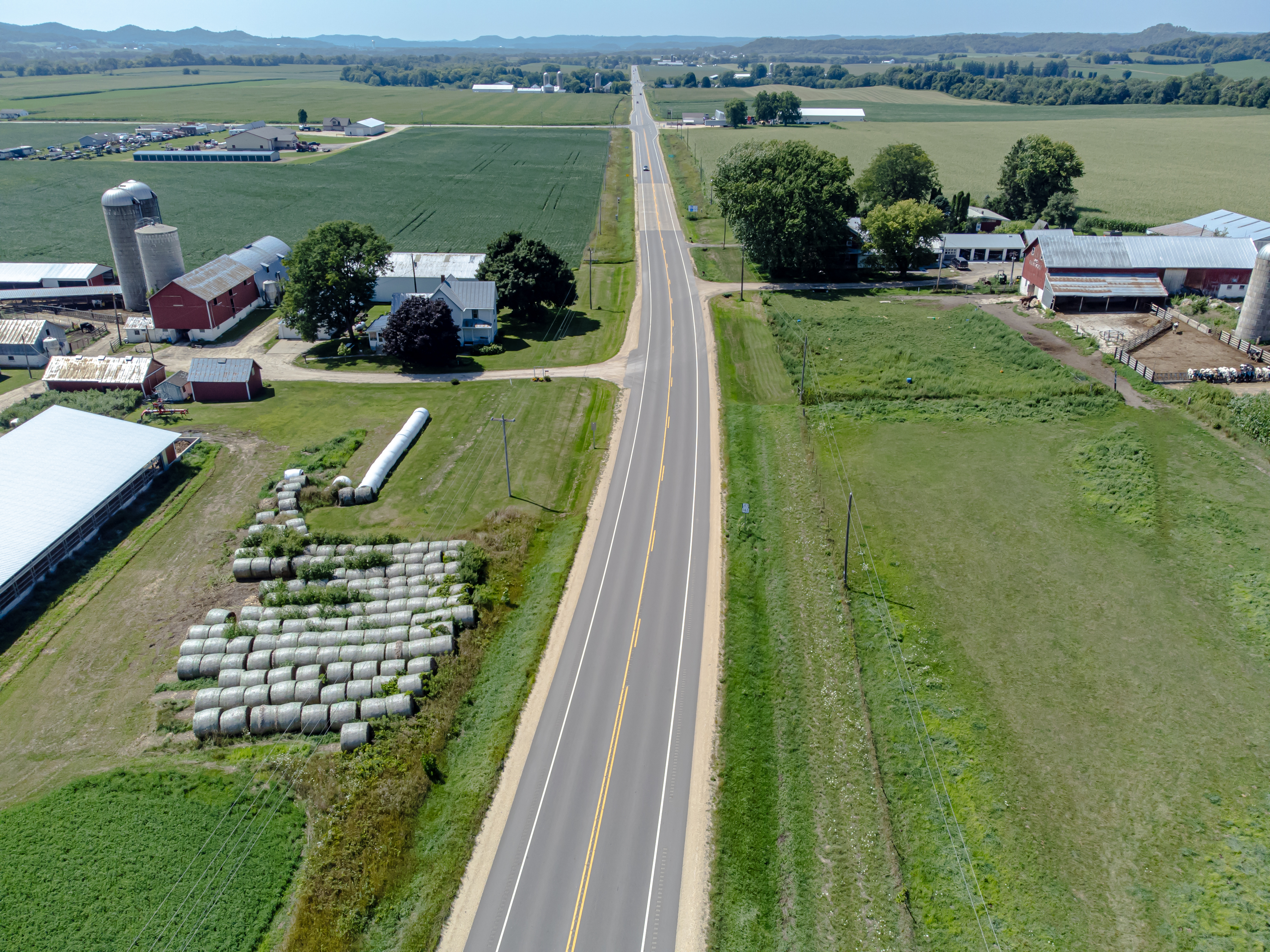
WIS 16 by Bangor at the junction with WIS 162

The route then follows I-90 very closely as a frontage road to Tomah where it junctions with WIS 131 and joins US 12. The highways continue paralleling I-90 and I-94 southeast and pass through Oakdale and into Juneau County.

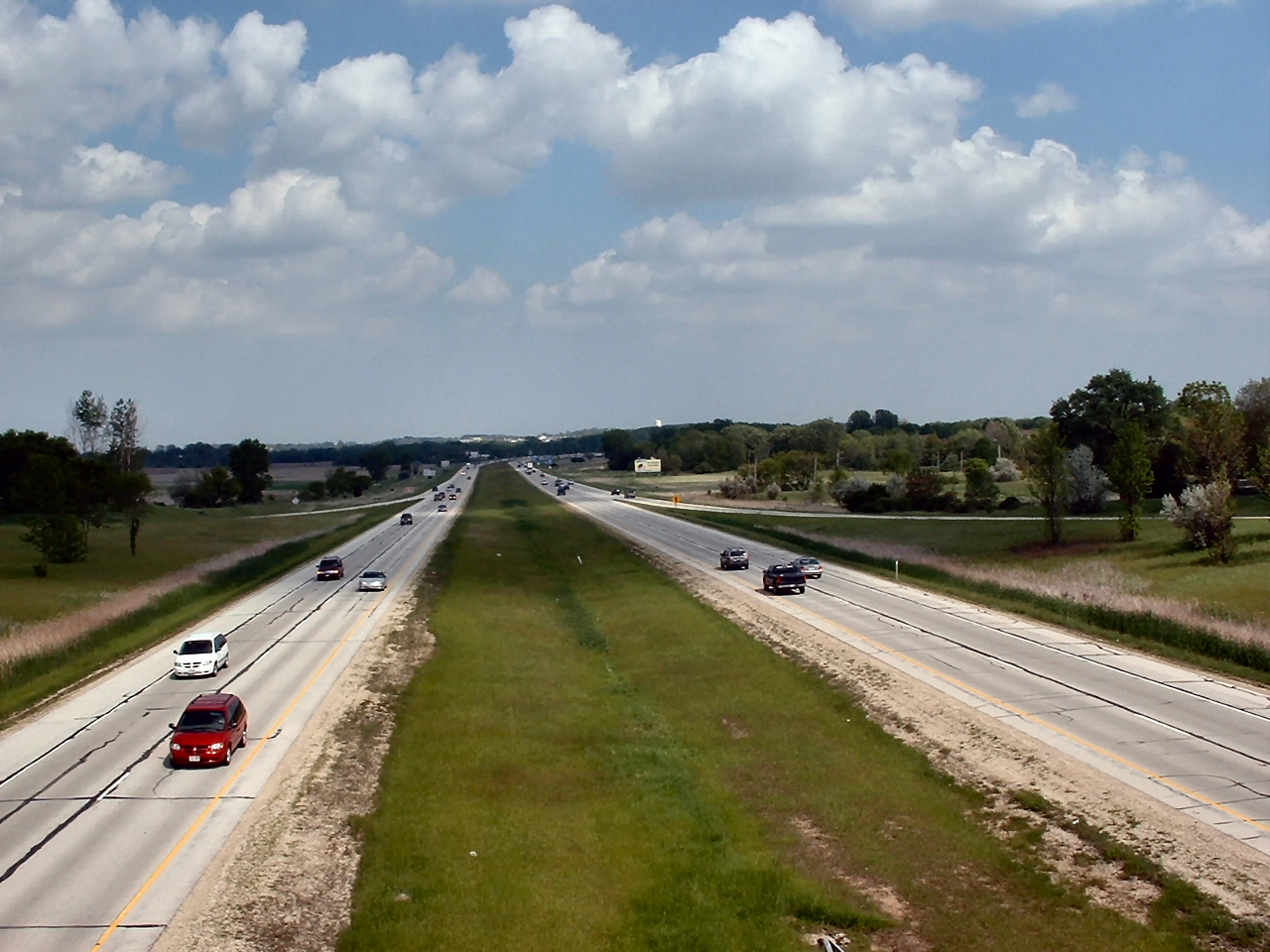
Freeway section of WIS 16, looking east from the Ryan Street overpass in Pewaukee

WIS 16 and US 12 pass through Camp Douglas and cross WIS 80 in New Lisbon. The highways then junction with WIS 58 and WIS 82 in Mauston as they continue southeast. The routes slowly trek eastward and pass through Lyndon Station where Rocky Arbor State Park is located. The highways turn southeast again and crossing the Interstates and into Sauk County and Wisconsin Dells.

WIS 16 turns east off of US 12 onto WIS 13 north and passes through downtown Wisconsin Dells and into Columbia County. WIS 23 East also joins the highways at the same point. WIS 16 turns off from WIS 13 and WIS 23 on the east side of Wisconsin Dells and junctions with WIS 127 one mile (1.6 km) southeast of town. WIS 16 follows the Wisconsin River into Portage, meeting the other terminus of WIS 127 at the interchange with I-39.

The highway then passes through Portage, crossing WIS 33 and joining US 51 south for five miles (8.0 km). WIS 16 turns east off the US route and crosses WIS 22 in Wyocena and passes through Rio, Doylestown and Fall River. WIS 60 joins WIS 16 and together, they cross US 151, WIS 73 and junction with WIS 89 in Columbus as they enter Dodge County.

WIS 16 and WIS 60 turn east and pass through the unincorporated town of Astico and Lowell. WIS 16 leaves WIS 60 and joins WIS 26 at the junction of the two highways in Clyman. WIS 16 leaves WIS 26 and bypasses Watertown to the north and east and into Jefferson County. WIS 19 terminates on WIS 16 east of Watertown.

WIS 16 passes around Ixonia, becomes an expressway, and enters Waukesha County along a bypass of Oconomowoc. WIS 67 joins the expressway north of Oconomowoc. WIS 16 turns east onto the freeway segment and passes into Hartland, crossing WIS 83 there. WIS 190, also known as Capitol Drive, terminates at WIS 16 as the freeway turns south in Pewaukee. WIS 16 ends at a flyover interchange and its traffic merges onto I-94 east near Waukesha.

== History ==
State Trunk Highway 29
- Location: La Crosse to Clyman
- Existed: 1918–1926

U.S. Highway 16
- Location: La Crosse to Milwaukee
- Existed: 1926–1978

In 1918, today's alignment of WIS 16 was WIS 21 from La Crosse to New Lisbon, along with WIS 12 east of Tomah. The route from Kilbourn (Wisconsin Dells) to Clyman was WIS 29. WIS 26 followed its current alignment to Watertown and the route from Watertown to Waukesha was WIS 19. WIS 29 was extended westward to La Crosse when WIS 21 was truncated back to north of New Lisbon. When the U.S. Routes debuted in 1926, WIS 29 was removed from the books as the entire alignment was replaced by US 16. WIS 19 was truncated back to its current terminus.

The current eastern terminus of WIS 16 was the site of the dedication ceremonies for the first completed segment of Interstate 94 in Wisconsin. The segment was opened on September 4, 1958. The first major interchange on the new Interstate was originally where US 16 turned north towards Pewaukee and WIS 30 continued west with I-94. The section of US 16 between the interchange outside of Waukesha and downtown Milwaukee was truncated at the interchange in the 1960s. US 16's designation was removed from the route and replaced with the current WIS 16 in 1978.

The original WIS 16 followed present day WIS 29 from Chippewa Falls to Green Bay via Wausau and Shawano. The route then followed a route that would become US 141 to Manitowoc where it ended at then WIS 17 (present day WIS 42).

=== Oconomowoc bypass ===
The alignment of the eastern section of Highway 16 changed in late 2006 when the rest of the Oconomowoc bypass was opened to traffic. The four-lane, limited access divided highway routes Highway 16 around Lac La Belle on the west side of the city, meeting up with Highway 67 north of downtown. Eventually, the bypass will result in the removal of the state highway designation from Wisconsin Avenue through downtown Oconomowoc.

The signs for Highway 16 through downtown Oconomowoc have not yet been changed, due to the reconstruction of Wisconsin Avenue through the downtown area during the summer of 2008. As of November 2008, Oconomowoc officials and WisDOT had not yet set a firm date for the jurisdictional transfer, though it was likely that it will be done by the summer of 2009.

Currently, the limited-access highway around Oconomowoc is designated as Wisconsin Highway 16 on signage. Some signage, especially the signs located at the end of the freeway segment on West Highway 16 when a right turn must be made to continue on the bypass, say Bypass West Wisconsin Highway 16.

== Major intersections ==
County	Location	mi	km	Exit	Destinations	Notes
La Crosse	La Crosse	0.0	0.0		US 14 west / US 61 north / MN 16 west / I-90 Alt. west – La Crescent	Minnesota state line (La Crosse West Channel Bridge)
La Crosse	La Crosse	1.0	1.6		Mississippi River Bridge over the Mississippi River	
La Crosse	La Crosse	1.4	2.3		US 14 east / US 61 south / US 53 / Great River Road south (3rd Street) / I-90 Alt. – Viroqua, Cashton	One-way street; eastern end of US 14/US 61/GRR concurrency; national southern terminus of SB US 53; I-90 Alt. follows US 53 (3rd St.); eastern end of WB I-90 Alt. concurrency
La Crosse	La Crosse	1.4	2.3		US 14 / US 61 / Great River Road (4th Street)	One-way street, inbound access only; western end of EB US 14 west/US 61/GRR north concurrency
La Crosse	La Crosse	1.4	2.3		US 14 west / US 61 north / US 53 / Great River Road north (3rd Street north) / I-90 Alt. east – Onalaska, La Crescent	One-way streets, outbound access only; eastern end of EB US 14 west/US 61/GRR north concurrency; national southern terminus of NB US 53; I-90 Alt. follows US 53/GRR north (3rd St.)
La Crosse	La Crosse	2.6	4.2		WIS 35 (Lang Drive/West Avenue)	
La Crosse	La Crosse	5.7	9.2		CTH-B (Gillette Street) / Sunset Lane	Western end of CTH-B concurrency
La Crosse	La Crosse	6.5	10.5		CTH-B / Coneco Road – Barre Mills, La Crosse River State Trail	Eastern end of CTH-B concurrency
La Crosse	La Crosse	7.1	11.4		WIS 157 west / Alt. I-90 west – Onalaska, Airport	Western end of Alt. I-90 concurrency
La Crosse	Onalaska	8.3	13.4		I-90 – Minnesota, Madison, Airport	Exit 5 along I-90
La Crosse	West Salem	14.2	22.9		CTH-C / Alt. I-90 (Leonard Street North)	Western end of CTH-C concurrency
La Crosse	Town of Hamilton	14.6	23.5		WIS 108 north / CTH-C – Mindoro, Melrose	Eastern end of CTH-C concurrency
La Crosse	Town of Burns	18.5	29.8		WIS 162 north – Melrose	Western end of WIS 162 concurrency
La Crosse	Town of Burns	19.0	30.6		WIS 162 south / Alt. I-90 – Bangor	Eastern end of WIS 162 concurrency
Monroe	Sparta	27.8	44.7		WIS 27 / WIS 71 west / Alt. I-90 (Black River Street) – Black River Falls, Cashton	Western end of WIS 21/WIS 71 concurrency
Monroe	Sparta	28.3	45.5		WIS 21 east (Water Street) – Fort McCoy, Business District	Eastern end of WIS 21 concurrency
Monroe	Town of Angelo	29.5	47.5		WIS 71 east – Norwalk	Eastern end of WIS 71 concurrency
Monroe	Town of Angelo	30.6	49.2		I-90 – Tomah, Madison, La Crosse	Exit 28 along I-90
Monroe	Tomah	44.6	71.8		US 12 west / WIS 131 south / Alt. I-90 / Alt. I-94 west (Superior Avenue) – Black River Falls, Wilton, Amtrak Station	Western end of US 12/Alt. I-94 concurrency
Monroe	Tomah	46.2	74.4		I-90 / Alt. I-94 – Madison, La Crosse	Exit 43 along I-90
Monroe	Oakdale	51.0	82.1		CTH-N / CTH-PP / Alt. I-90 / Alt. I-94 (Oakwood Street)	
Juneau	Camp Douglas	57.0	91.7		CTH-C / CTH-H – Camp Douglas	Western end of CTH-C/CTH-H concurrency
Juneau	Camp Douglas	57.3	92.2		CTH-H / Castle Street	Eastern end of CTH-H concurrency
Juneau	Camp Douglas	57.5	92.5		CTH-C to I-90 / I-94 – Camp Williams, Volk Field	Eastern end of CTH–C concurrency
Juneau	New Lisbon	63.3	101.9		WIS 80 north / CTH-A / Alt. I-90 / Alt. I-94 (Bridge Street) – Necedah	Western end of WIS 80 concurrency
Juneau	New Lisbon	63.9	102.8		WIS 80 south (Monroe Street) – Elroy, Elroy-Sparta State Trail, The "400" State Trail	Eastern end of WIS 80 concurrency
Juneau	Mauston	70.9	114.1		Division Street	Former WIS 58 south/WIS 82 west/CTH-G
Juneau	Mauston	71.1	114.4		WIS 58 / WIS 82 / CTH-G (Union Street) to I-90 / I-94	
Juneau	Lyndon Station	82.2	132.3		CTH-HH to I-90 / I-94	
Juneau	Town of Lyndon	88.7	142.7		I-90 / I-94 – Tomah, Madison	Exit 85 along I-90 / I-94
Sauk	Wisconsin Dells	90.4	145.5		CTH-A	Western end of CTH-A concurrency
Sauk	Wisconsin Dells	91.0	146.5		US 12 east / WIS 23 west / CTH-A / Alt. I-90 east / Alt. I-94 east – Lake Delton WIS 13 south / Alt. I-90 / Alt. I-94 – Madison	Eastern end of US 12/CTH-A/Alt. I-90/Alt. I-94 concurrency; western end of WIS 13/WIS 23 concurrency
Columbia	Wisconsin Dells	92.4	148.7		WIS 13 north / WIS 23 east / Alt. I-39 north – Wis Rapids, Adams, Montello, Endeavor	Eastern end of WIS 13/WIS 23/Alt. I-39 concurrency
Columbia	Town of Newport	94.0	151.3		WIS 127 east – Briggsville	
Columbia	Portage	106.9	172.0		I-39 / WIS 127 west to I-90 / US 51 / WIS 78 – Stevens Point, Merrimac, Madison, Briggsville, Columbia Correctional Institution	I-39 exit 89; western end of Alt. I-90 concurrency
Columbia	Portage	109.1	175.6		MacFarlane Road	Western end of WIS 16 east/US 51 south concurrency
Columbia	Portage	109.3	175.9		WIS 33 (Cook Street)	
Columbia	Portage	109.5	176.2		US 51 north (DeWitt Street) to WIS 33 east	Western end of WIS 16 west/US 51 north concurrency
Columbia	Town of Pacific	113.7	183.0		US 51 south / Alt. I-39 south / Alt. I-90 east – Madison	Eastern end of US 51/Alt. I-39/Alt. I-90 concurrency
Columbia	Wyocena	118.7	191.0		WIS 22 – Wyocena, Madison	Interchange
Columbia	Town of Fountain Prairie	132.2	212.8		WIS 146 north – Cambria	
Columbia	Columbus	136.3	219.4		WIS 60 west – Arlington, Lodi	Western end of WIS 60 concurrency
Columbia	Columbus	136.6	219.8		US 151 – Beaver Dam, Sun Prairie, Madison	Interchange; US 151 exit 118
Columbia	Columbus	137.8	221.8		WIS 73 (Ludington Street) to WIS 89	
Dodge	Town of Clyman	152.2	244.9		WIS 26 north / WIS 60 east – Juneau, Hustisford	Interchange; eastern end of WIS 60 concurrency; western end of WIS 26 concurrency; WIS 26 exit 52
Dodge	Town of Emmet	160.0	257.5		WIS 26 south (Bus. WIS 16 east) / Bus. WIS 26 begins – Watertown	Interchange; eastern end of WIS 26 concurrency; western end of Bus. WIS 26 concurrency; WIS 26 exit 45
Dodge	Town of Emmet	160.8	258.8		Bus. WIS 26 south to CTH-L – Watertown	Interchange; eastern end of Bus. WIS 26 concurrency
Dodge	Town of Emmet	162.0	260.7		To CTH-M	Interchange
Jefferson	Town of Watertown	164.4	264.6		WIS 19 west / Bus. WIS 16 west – Watertown	Interchange; westbound exit and eastbound entrance
Jefferson	Ixonia	172.2	277.1		Oconomowoc	Interchange
Waukesha	Town of Oconomowoc	175.6	282.6		WIS 67 north – Oconomowoc, Mayville	Interchange; western end of WIS 67 concurrency
Waukesha	Town of Oconomowoc	179.3	288.6		WIS 67 south / Alt. I-94 west to I-94 – Downtown Oconomowoc	Interchange; eastern end of WIS 67 concurrency; west end of Alt. I-94 overlap; west end of freeway
Waukesha	Okauchee Lake	180.3	290.2	176	CTH-P (Brown Street) / Gifford Road	
Waukesha	Okauchee Lake	181.8	292.6	178	CTH-P (Sawyer Road)	
Waukesha	Nashotah	183.3	295.0	179	CTH-C – Nashotah, Delafield	
Waukesha	Merton–Delafield town line	185.4	298.4	181	WIS 83 / Alt. I-94 – Delafield, Chenequa	
Waukesha	Hartland	186.3	299.8	182	CTH-E / CTH-KC – Hartland, Merton	Eastbound exit and westbound entrance
Waukesha	Hartland	186.9	300.8	183	CTH-KC / CTH-E – Hartland, Merton	Eastbound entrance and westbound exit
Waukesha	City of Pewaukee	188.0	302.6	184	CTH-JK / CTH-KE (Jungbluth Road / North Shore Drive)	
Waukesha	City of Pewaukee	190.2	306.1	186	CTH-KF (Ryan Street)	
Waukesha	Village of Pewaukee	191.7	308.5	187	WIS 190 (Capitol Drive)	
Waukesha	City of Pewaukee	192.5	309.8	188	CTH-JJ / CTH-T to Main Street west / I-94	
Waukesha	City of Pewaukee	193.2	310.9		I-94 east – Milwaukee	Eastern terminus; I-94 exit 293C; Eastbound exit and westbound entrance
1.000 mi = 1.609 km; 1.000 km = 0.621 mi: Concurrency terminus; Incomplete access

== Related routes ==
=== Watertown business loop ===
Business State Trunk Highway 16
- Location: Watertown
- Existed: 1978–present
- History: Established as Bus. US 16 in 1961

Business State Trunk Highway 16 (Bus. WIS 16) follows a former alignment of US 16 through downtown Watertown. The route travels south along Bus. WIS 26 (North Church Street) and east along WIS 19 (Main Street). It was created as Business U.S. Highway 16 (Bus. US 16) in 1961, when US 16 was re-routed onto a bypass of Watertown.
