= U.S. Route 14 in Wisconsin =

Section of U.S. Highway in Wisconsin

U.S. Highway 14
- US 14 highlighted in red

Route information
- Maintained by WisDOT
- Length: 198.49 mi (319.44 km)
- Existed: 1933–present

Major junctions
- West end: US 14 / US 61 / MN 16 / I-90 Alt. at La Crosse
- US 53 / WIS 16 in La Crosse; US 61 / WIS 131 in Readstown; US 12 in Middleton; US 18 / US 151 in Madison; US 12 / US 18 / US 151 in Madison; US 51 in Janesville; I-39 / I-90 in Janesville; I-43 in Darien
- East end: US 14 at Walworth

Location
- Country: United States
- State: Wisconsin
- Counties: La Crosse, Vernon, Richland, Sauk, Iowa, Dane, Rock, Walworth

Highway system
- United States Numbered Highway System; List; Special; Divided; Wisconsin State Trunk Highway System; Interstate; US; State; Scenic; Rustic
← WIS 13	→ WIS 14

U.S. Highway 14 (US 14) in the state of Wisconsin runs northwest–southeast across the western to southwest portions of the state. It links La Crosse and the southwestern portion of the state with Madison and Janesville. US 14 is mostly two-lane surface road with the exception of a few multilane urban arterials and a freeway section around Madison that it mostly shares with US 12.

== Route description ==
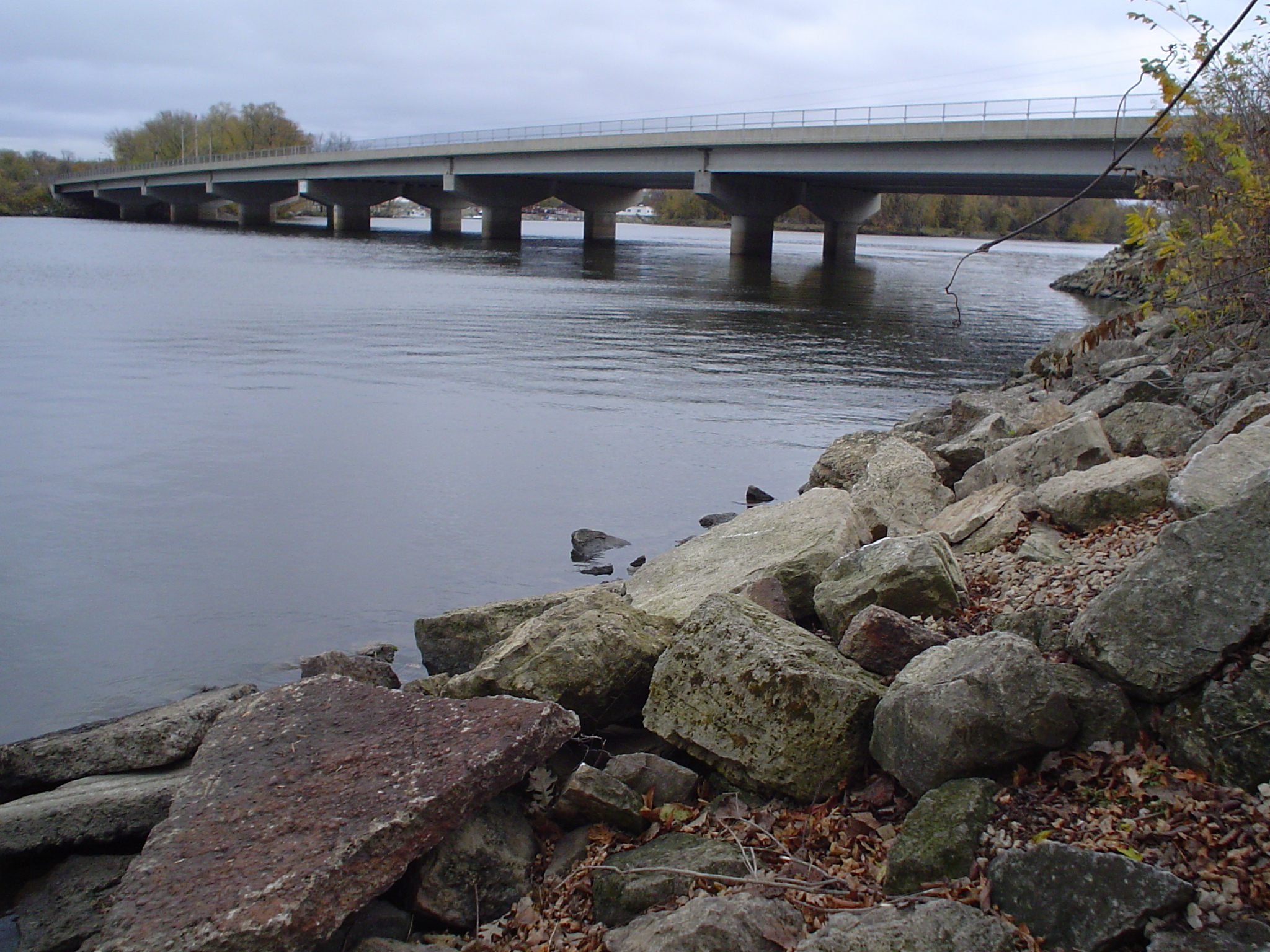
The La Crosse West Channel Bridge carrying US 14, US 61, MN 16, and WIS 16 across the Mississippi River between La Crescent, Minnesota, and La Crosse, Wisconsin. This is the river's West Channel.

US 14 enters Wisconsin from La Crescent along with US 61 and State Trunk Highway 16 (WIS 16; linking to Minnesota State Highway 16, or MN 16). The three highways immediately junction with US 53 in the downtown area and WIS 16 continues east while US 14 along with US 61 turn southeast and out of La Crosse, linking up with WIS 35 south along the way for three miles (4.8 km), after a short concurrency, US 14 and US 61 turn east while WIS 35 continues south. The U.S. Highways then exit La Crosse County for Vernon County. In Vernon County, the routes passes through Coon Valley and Westby, joining with WIS 27 and turning south and passing through Viroqua. WIS 27 splits off to the southwest as US 14 and US 61 head southeast to Readstown where US 61 turns south and US 14 heads east into Richland County.

US 14 continues southeast into Richland County, bypassing Sylvan and Boaz before turning east. After a seven-mile (11 km) east trek, the highway enters Richland Center and immediately turns south. WIS 80 crosses the highway in the southern part of downtown before US 14 turns southeast and junctions with WIS 58. US 14 passes through Sextonville and turns south to collect WIS 60 at Gotham. The two highways then head east-southeast to Lone Rock where they cross WIS 130 and exit to Sauk County. The routes then split at Spring Green while crossing WIS 23, with US 14 heading south into Iowa County while WIS 60 continues east. US 14 bypasses Helena and passes through Arena and into Dane County. US 14 turns southeast at Mazomanie and junctions with WIS 19, then passes through Black Earth and Cross Plains and turns east to meet US 12 east at the West Beltline Highway in Middleton, a suburb of Madison.

US 14 and US 12 follow the beltline south and around the west side of Madison and join US 18 east and US 151 north. All four U.S. Highways head east for three miles (4.8 km) through urban Madison where US 151 splits north to head into downtown Madison and US 12 and US 18 continue east, while US 14 turns south toward Oregon on a seven-mile (11 km) stretch of freeway. The highway bypasses Oregon to the east and becomes a two-lane road and enters Rock County east of Brooklyn. US 14 turns southeastward at Evansville and passes through Leyden and then takes a northeastern bypass around Janesville, crossing US 51 and meeting up with I-39, I-90, and WIS 26 at a triangle formed by the three distinct routes northeast of the city. US 14 then turns south and meets WIS 11. Both highways turn east and pass through Emerald Grove on the way into Walworth County. US 14 turns southeast to Darien while WIS 11 continues east to Delavan. US 14 junctions with I-43 just before passing through Darien. At Walworth, the highway turns due south and heads into Illinois.

== History ==
US 14 was signed later than the other U.S. Highways in Wisconsin, opening in 1933. The route replaced the old versions of WIS 11, from La Crosse to Madison, WIS 13 from Madison to Evansville, WIS 92 into Janesville, and WIS 20 and WIS 89 from Janesville to Illinois. The older WIS 14 was in existence when US 14 was opened, that was redesignated as WIS 81 and WIS 15 (the latter being the present-day I-43).

In 1969, US 14 was upgraded to freeway standards between Oregon and Madison. The old alignment was designated as CTH-MM.

La Crosse saw an additional bridge in the Mississippi River Bridge on its west side which carried US 14 along with US 61 and WIS 16. An additional bridge was added to the existing Cass Street Bridge in 2003–2004 in an effort to relieve traffic congestion. The old bridge, which served two-lane traffic before 2004, now serves two lanes of westbound traffic and the new bridge, dubbed the Cameron Avenue Bridge, carries two lanes of eastbound traffic along with pedestrian and bicycle facilities. Additional lanes were added to the highway between the channels of the Mississippi River.

== Major intersections ==
County	Location	mi	km	Exit	Destinations	Notes
La Crosse	La Crosse	0.00	0.00		US 14 west / US 61 north / MN 16 west / I-90 Alt. – La Crescent	Continuation into Minnesota
La Crosse	La Crosse	0.00	0.00		La Crosse West Channel Bridge; Wisconsin–Minnesota line	
La Crosse	La Crosse	1	1.6		Mississippi River Bridge	
La Crosse	La Crosse	1.4	2.3		US 53 / Great River Road south (3rd Street) / WIS 16 east (Cameron Avenue east) / Alt. I-90 east – Onalaska, Viroqua	3rd St. and Cameron Ave. are one-way streets; eastern end of EB WIS 16 overlap; national southern terminus of SB US 53; I-90 Alt. follows WI 16 east (Cameron Ave.)
La Crosse	La Crosse	1.4	2.3		US 53 (4th Street north) / Great River Road north (Cass Street east) / WIS 16 east / Alt. I-90 west – Onalaska, West Salem	4th St. is a one-way street, outbound access only; western end of WB WIS 16 east overlap; national southern terminus of NB US 53; I-90 Alt. follows US 53/GRR north (4th St.)
La Crosse	La Crosse	1.4	2.3		WIS 16 (Cameron Avenue) / Alt. I-90 east	One-way street, inbound access only; eastern end of WB WIS 16 east overlap
La Crosse	La Crosse	1.8	2.9		WIS 33 east (Jackson Street)	
La Crosse	La Crosse	2.8	4.5		WIS 35 north (West Avenue South)	Northern end of WIS 35 overlap
La Crosse	La Crosse	6.1	9.8		WIS 35 south / Great River Road south	Southern end of WIS 35 overlap
Vernon	Town of Hamburg	16.7	26.9		WIS 162 south – Chaseburg, Stoddard	Western end of WIS 162 overlap
Vernon	Coon Valley	17.6	28.3		WIS 162 north – Bangor	Eastern end of WIS 162 overlap
Vernon	Westby	27.4	44.1		WIS 27 north – Sparta	Northern end of WIS 27 overlap
Vernon	Viroqua	34.8	56.0		WIS 56 / WIS 82 east – La Farge, Hillsboro, Genoa	Northern end of WIS 82 overlap
Vernon	Town of Franklin	37.6	60.5		WIS 27 south / WIS 82 west – De Soto, Prairie du Chien	Southern end of WIS 27 and WIS 82 overlaps
Vernon	Readstown	45.3	72.9		US 61 south / WIS 131 south – Soldiers Grove, Boscobel	Eastern end of US 61 overlap; western end of WIS 131 overlap
Vernon	Readstown	45.6	73.4		WIS 131 north – Viola, La Farge	Eastern end of WIS 131 overlap
Richland	Town of Dayton	61.3	98.7		WIS 171 west – Rolling Ground	
Richland	Richland Center	69.4	111.7		WIS 80 – Hillsboro, Muscoda	
Richland	Town of Richland	73.3	118.0		WIS 58 north – La Valle	
Richland	Gotham	79.1	127.3		WIS 60 west – Prairie du Chien	West end of WIS 60 overlap
Richland	Lone Rock	83.9	135.0		WIS 130 north	Western end of WIS 130 overlap
Richland	Lone Rock	84.6	136.2		WIS 130 south / WIS 133 south – Lone Rock	Eastern end of WIS 130 overlap
Sauk	Spring Green	90.9	146.3		WIS 23 north – Reedsburg	Western end of WIS 23 overlap
Sauk	Spring Green	91.1	146.6		WIS 60 east – Sauk City	Eastern end of WIS 60 overlap
Sauk	Spring Green	91.5	147.3		WIS 23 south – Dodgeville	Eastern end of WIS 23 overlap
Iowa	No major junctions					
Dane	Mazomanie	106.9	172.0		WIS 19 east / WIS 78 north – Sauk City, Waunakee	Northern end of WIS 78 overlap
Dane	Black Earth	109.3	175.9		WIS 78 south – Mount Horeb	Southern end of WIS 78 overlap
Dane	Middleton	122.3	196.8		US 12 west – Baraboo	Western end of US 12 overlap
Dane	Middleton			251B	Parmenter Street	Exit numbers follow US 12; westbound exit only
Dane	Madison			252	Greenway Boulevard	
Dane	Madison			253	Old Sauk Road	
Dane	Madison			254	CTH-M / CTH-S (Mineral Point Road)	
Dane	Madison			255	Gammon Road	
Dane	Madison			257	Whitney Way	
Dane	Madison	129.1	207.8	258	US 18 west / US 151 south (Verona Road) / Midvale Boulevard – Dodgeville	Western end of US 18/US 151 overlap
Dane	Madison			258A	Seminole Highway	Westbound exit and eastbound entrance
Dane	Madison			259	Todd Drive	
Dane	Madison			260	CTH-D (Fish Hatchery Road)	Eastbound exits signed separately as 260A (south) and 260B (north)
Dane	Madison	132	212	132A	US 12 east / US 18 east (Beltline Highway) / US 151 north (Park Street) / Alt. US 18 west / Alt. US 151 south	Exit numbers follow US 14; no exit number westbound; exit number is for US 12/US 18; eastern end of US 12/US 18/US 151 overlap; western end of US 18 Alt/US 151 Alt overlap; US 12 exit 261
Dane	Fitchburg			133	McCoy Road	Eastbound exit and westbound entrance only
Dane	Fitchburg			134	Lacy Road	Opened October 18, 2012
Dane	Fitchburg			139	CTH-MM / Alt. US 18 east / Alt. US 151 south – Oregon, Fitchburg	East end of US 18 Alt/US 151 Alt overlap
Dane	Oregon	140.8	226.6	140	WIS 138 south – Stoughton	
Dane	Town of Rutland	145.8	234.6		WIS 92 north – Brooklyn	
Rock	Town of Union	148.5	239.0		WIS 59 east – Edgerton	Northern end of WIS 59 overlap
Rock	Evansville	151.4	243.7		WIS 59 west / WIS 213 south – Beloit, Monroe	Southern end of WIS 59 overlap
Rock	Janesville	165.9	267.0		US 51 / Alt. I-39 north – Edgerton, Janesville	I-39 Alt follows US 51 north
Rock	Janesville	167.9	270.2		WIS 26 (Milton Avenue)	
Rock	Janesville	168.5	271.2		I-39 / I-90 – Madison, Beloit, Chicago	I-90 exit 171B-C
Rock	Janesville	172.8	278.1		WIS 11 west (Racine Street) / Alt. I-43	Western end of WIS 11 overlap; I-43 Alt follows WIS 11.
Rock	Town of Bradford	177.6	285.8		WIS 140 south / Alt. I-39 south – Clinton	I-39 Alt follows WI 140
Walworth	Town of Darien	184.1	296.3		WIS 11 east / WIS 89 north – Whitewater, Delavan	Eastern end of WIS 11 overlap
Walworth	Darien	187.4	301.6		I-43 – Milwaukee, Beloit	I-43 exit 15; north end of I-43 Alt
Walworth	Walworth	195.8	315.1		WIS 67 north – Williams Bay, Elkhorn	Northern end of WIS 67 overlap
Walworth	Town of Walworth	197.4	317.7		WIS 67 south – South Beloit	Southern end of WIS 67 overlap
Walworth	Town of Walworth	198.49	319.44		US 14 east – Harvard, Woodstock	Continuation into Illinois
1.000 mi = 1.609 km; 1.000 km = 0.621 mi: Concurrency terminus; Incomplete access

== See also ==
U.S. Route 14
Previous state: Minnesota	Wisconsin	Next state: Illinois
