= Wisconsin Highway 106 =

Highway in Wisconsin

State Trunk Highway 106
- WIS 106 highlighted in red

Route information
- Maintained by WisDOT
- Length: 28.23 mi (45.43 km)

Major junctions
- West end: WIS 73 near Albion
- US 12 / WIS 89 in Fort Atkinson
- East end: WIS 59 in Palmyra

Location
- Country: United States
- State: Wisconsin
- Counties: Dane, Jefferson

Highway system
- Wisconsin State Trunk Highway System; Interstate; US; State; Scenic; Rustic
← WIS 105	→ WIS 107

State Trunk Highway 106 (also called Highway 106, STH-106 or WIS 106) is a state highway in the U.S. state of Wisconsin. It runs east–west in southeastern Wisconsin between Albion and Palmyra, Jefferson County.

== Route description ==
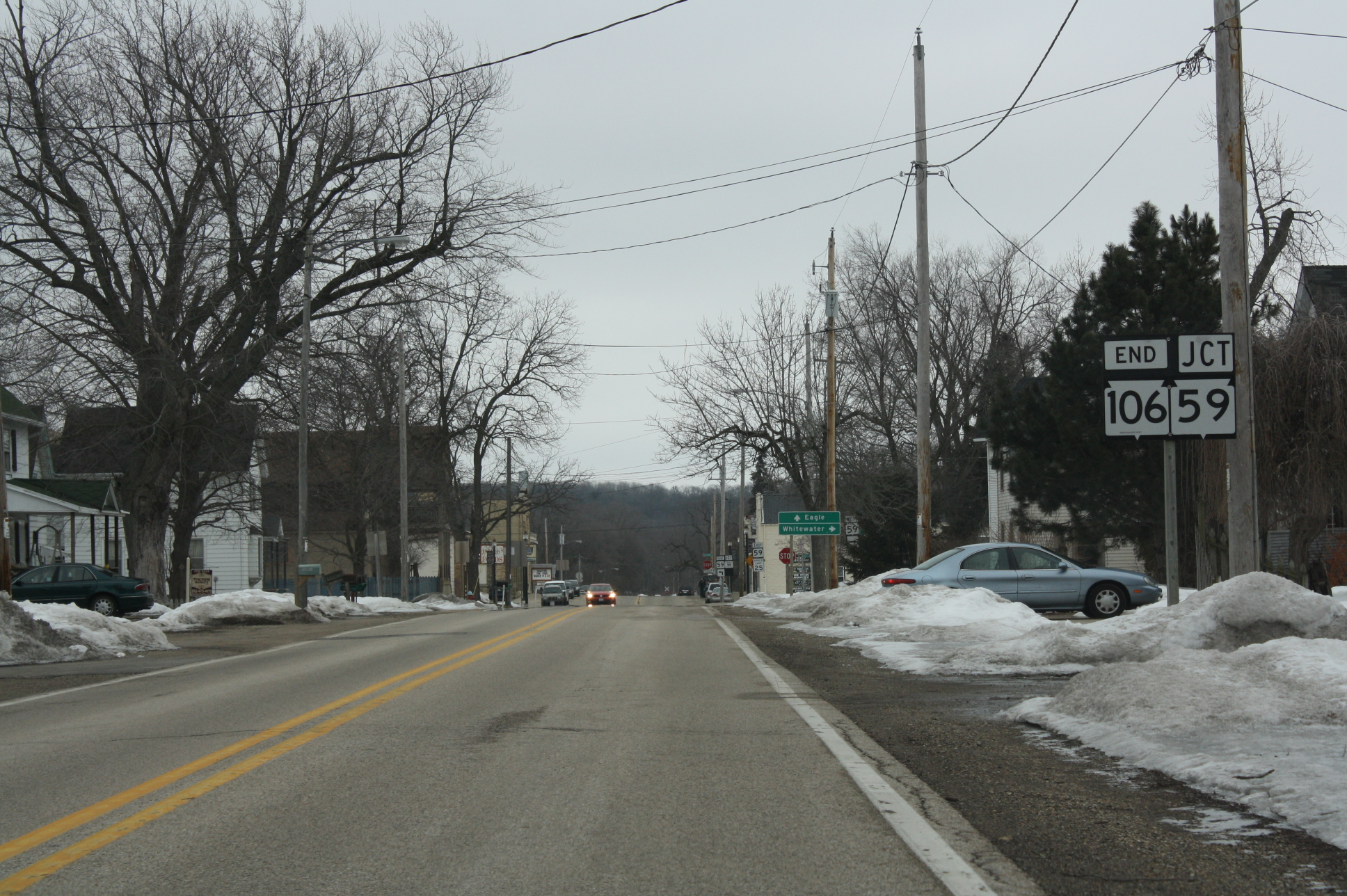
Looking south at the eastern terminus in Palmyra

Starting at WIS 73 near Albion, WIS 106 proceeds to travel eastward near the north shore of Lake Koshkonong. On its way, it runs through Busseyville. After leaving Lake Koshkonong, WIS 106 then meets WIS 26 at a diamond interchange. Along the way towards Fort Atkinson, it then travels along the north bank of the Rock River. In Fort Atkinson, it intersects US 12 and Bus. WIS 26. After that, it continues to travel eastward and then southeastward to Palmyra, meeting Hebron along the way. In Palmyra, it intersects WIS 59, and WIS 106 ends at this point.

== Major intersections ==
County	Location	mi	km	Destinations	Notes
Dane	Town of Albion			WIS 73 to I-39 – Edgerton, Columbus	
Jefferson	Town of Koshkonong			WIS 26 – Jefferson, Milton	Interchange
Jefferson	Fort Atkinson			US 12 / Bus. WIS 26 (Robert Street)	
Jefferson	Fort Atkinson			WIS 89 (Main Street)	
Jefferson	Palmyra			WIS 59 – Eagle, Whitewater	
1.000 mi = 1.609 km; 1.000 km = 0.621 mi
