= U.S. Route 18 in Wisconsin =

Segment of American highway

U.S. Highway 18
- US 18 highlighted in red

Route information
- Maintained by WisDOT
- Length: 182.16 mi (293.16 km)
- Existed: 1926–present

Major junctions
- West end: US 18 in Prairie du Chien
- US 61 in Fennimore; US 151 in Dodgeville; US 12 / US 14 in Madison; US 14 / US 151 in Madison; US 51 in Madison; I-39 / I-90 in Madison; US 12 in Cambridge; I-94 in Waukesha; I-41 / US 41 / US 45 in Milwaukee; I-43 in Milwaukee
- East end: Lincoln Memorial Drive in Milwaukee

Location
- Country: United States
- State: Wisconsin
- Counties: Crawford, Grant, Iowa, Dane, Jefferson, Waukesha, Milwaukee

Highway system
- United States Numbered Highway System; List; Special; Divided; Wisconsin State Trunk Highway System; Interstate; US; State; Scenic; Rustic
← WIS 17	→ WIS 18

U.S. Highway 18 (US 18) in the state of Wisconsin runs east–west across the southern part of the state. The highway serves as major connecting route between Madison and the southwest corner of the state. East of Madison, the route is paralleled by Interstate 94 (I-94) and serves as a local connection route to the communities along the Interstate. US 18 enters Wisconsin at Prairie du Chien and ends in downtown Milwaukee at Lincoln Memorial Drive, across from the Milwaukee Art Museum.

== Route description ==
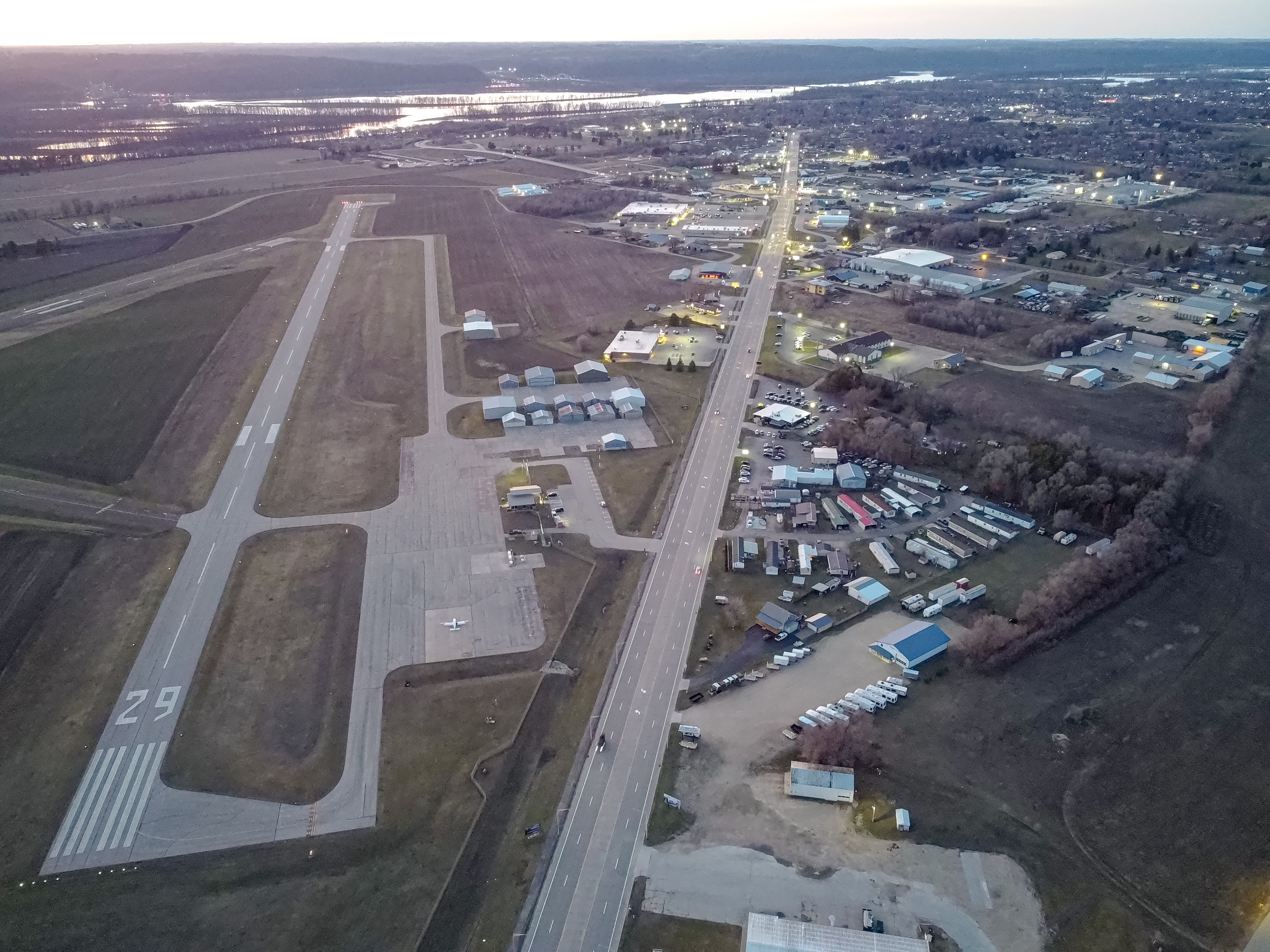
US-18/Wis-35 in Prairie du Chien

US 18 enters Crawford County from Iowa, crossing the Mississippi River using the Marquette–Joliet Bridge just west of Prairie du Chien. State Trunk Highway 60 (WIS 60) begins at the state line and runs concurrent with US 18 east from there. The two highways turn south at the along with WIS 35 downtown and head southeast out of the city. WIS 60 branches northeast from US 18 at Bridgeport. US 18 and WIS 35 continue southeast into Grant County The two highways split at Patch Grove with WIS 35 continuing southeastward along with WIS 133 south, while US 18 turns eastward along with WIS 133 north. WIS 133 branches north at Mount Hope. US 18 and US 61 junction in downtown Fennimore, and WIS 80 north joins the highway in Montfort, on the Iowa County line.

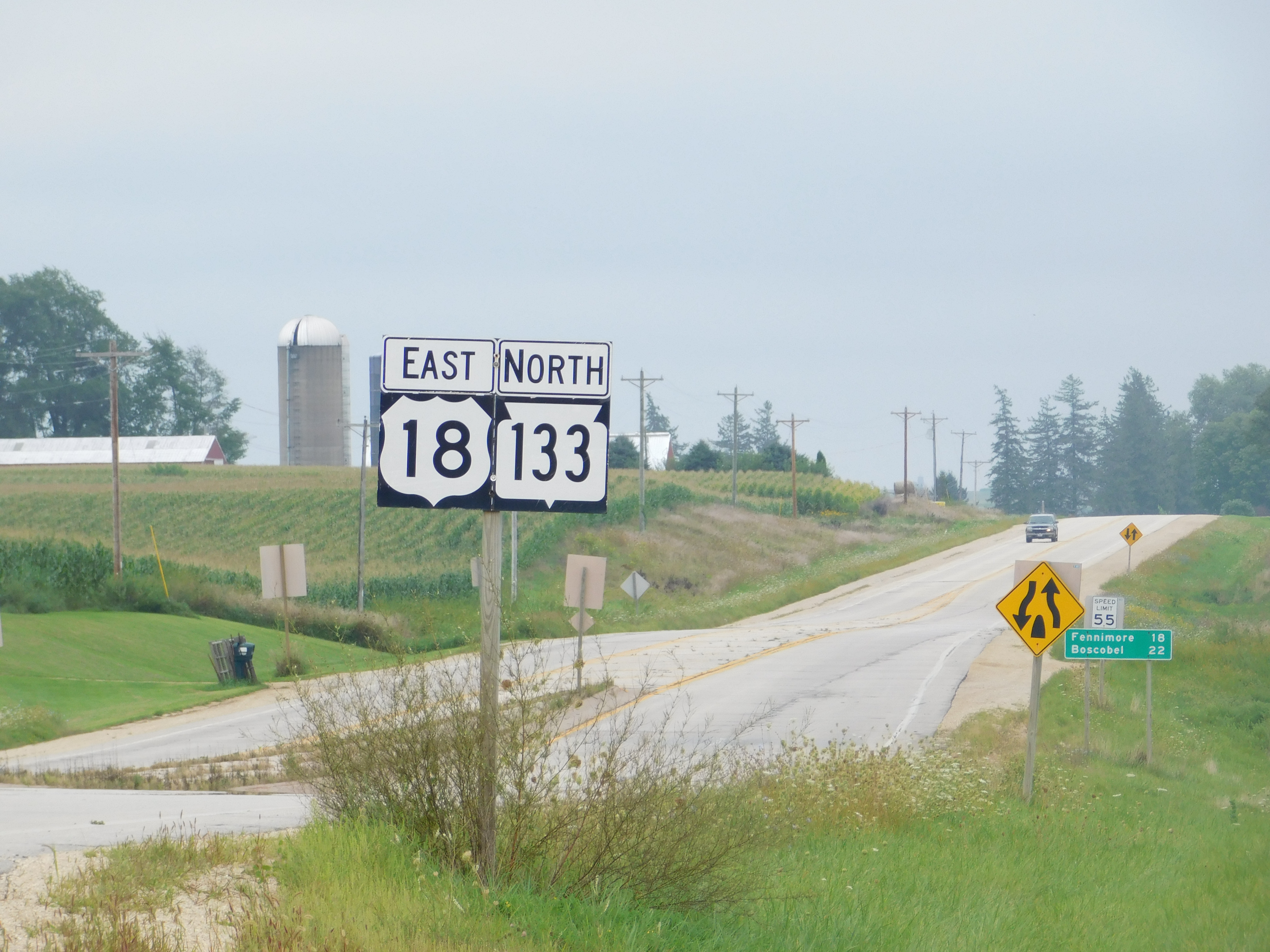
US 18/WIS 133 in Patch Grove

WIS 80 turns north at Cobb while US 18 continues east through Dodgeville, crossing WIS 23 and joining US 151 north. The two U.S. Highways share a common expressway and bypass Ridgeway and Barneveld on the way east into Dane County. In Dane County, US 18 and US 151 bypass Mount Horeb, crossing WIS 78 and WIS 92, and Verona and enter the Madison area, first passing through Fitchburg. Upon entering Madison, US 18 and US 151 join US 12 and US 14 east along the West Beltline Highway. US 151 and US 14 turn off the beltline three miles (4.8 km) east and US 12 and US 18 continue east, crossing US 51 and I-39/I-90 southeast of Madison. Four miles (6.4 km) east of the Interstates, US 12/US 18 becomes a two-lane surface road again and passes through Cambridge, where US 12 splits southeast at the Jefferson County line.

US 18 crosses WIS 89 and WIS 26 in Jefferson and passes through Sullivan. Entering Waukesha County, US 18 passes north of Dousman at WIS 67, south of the Lapham Peak Unit, Kettle Moraine State Forest, and north of Wales at WIS 83. US 18 then enters Waukesha along Summit Avenue. US 18 turns south from Summit Avenue on the new section of Les Paul Parkway (also known as the new Waukesha West Bypass) and goes the entire route of Les Paul Parkway going around the west, south, and east areas of the city of Waukesha along with the current WIS 59 and WIS 164 configuration from County Trunk Highway X (CTH X), and US 18 joins back up at Moreland Boulevard at the northeast terminus at the Les Paul Parkway/Wolf Road intersection. So US 18 is now rerouted by using Les Paul Parkway and does not go through downtown Waukesha anymore. WIS 164 turns west onto I-94, and US 18 continues east into Brookfield along Blue Mound Road. US 18 continues through Brookfield and Elm Grove along Blue Mound Road and enters Milwaukee County and Wauwatosa. US 18 crosses WIS 100, US 45, US 41, and I-41 near the Milwaukee County Zoo and continues east into Milwaukee. At WIS 175, the highway shifts onto Wisconsin Avenue. US 18 turns north onto North 35th Street and east on to West Highland Avenue where it crosses I-43 near Downtown Milwaukee. US 18 turns south on 6th Street. The east- and westbound lanes split at State and 6th streets; eastbound continues south on 6th Street and then east on Wells Street. US 18 eastbound joins WIS 32 at North Broadway (southbound) and North Milwaukee Street (Northbound). Both directions turn east onto East Michigan Street as WIS 32 continues south. Westbound US 18 follows Milwaukee Street north from Michigan Street, turns west on State Street. At 6th Street, westbound US 18 reaches its eastern terminus, the junction of Michigan Street and Lincoln Memorial Drive five blocks east of WIS 32, and one block north of I-794.

== History ==
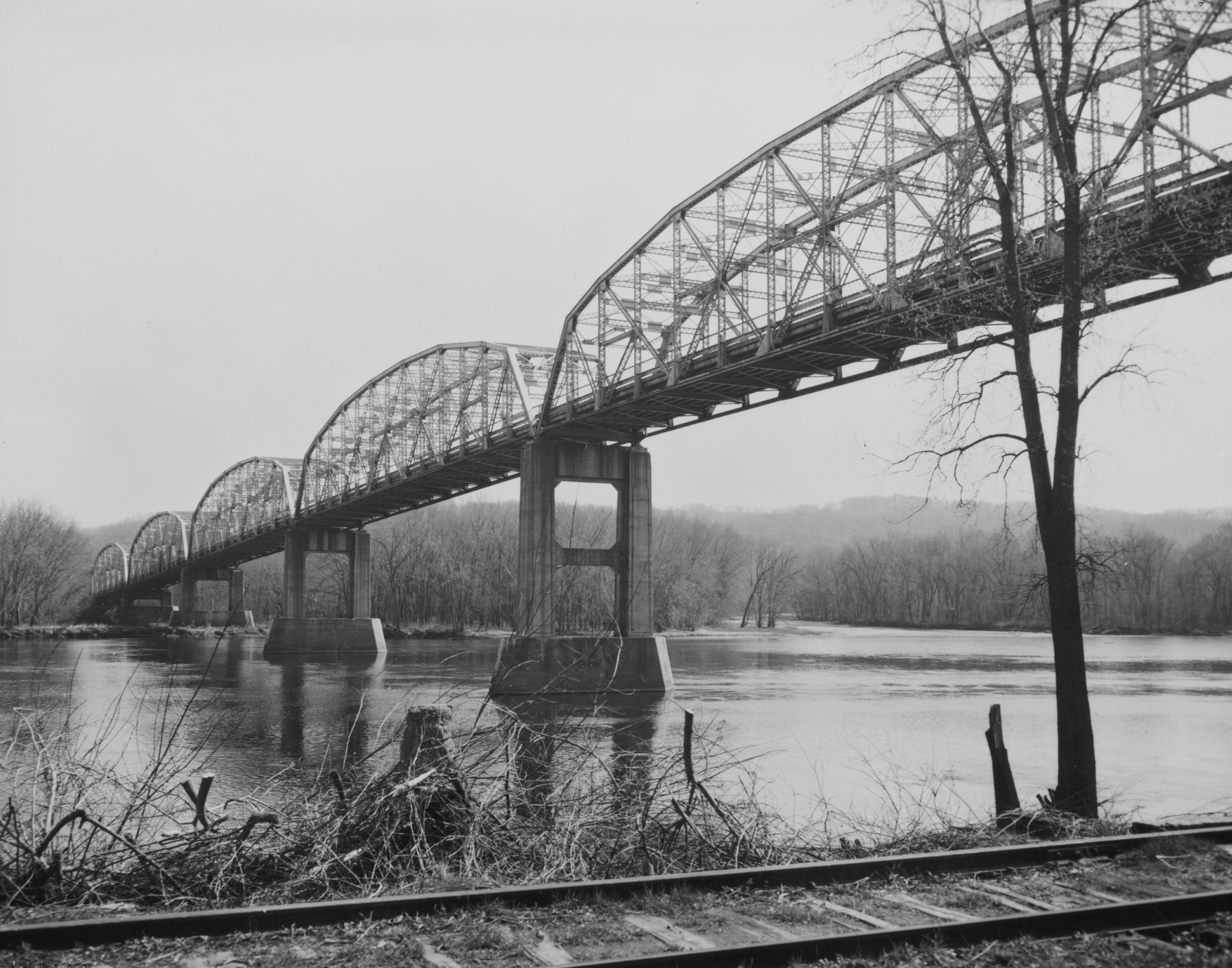
The old US 18 bridge over the Wisconsin River in Bridgeport

Prior to 1926, the route that US 18 follows today was designated as WIS 19. By 1923, the WIS 19 extended from Prairie du Chien to Milwaukee. Shortly after US 18 was signed, it was rerouted along WIS 30 and WIS 19—the present route within Milwaukee. The remainder of the route was relocated to its current alignment in 1932.

The eastern terminus was an originally stated in official Wisconsin Department of Transportation documentation to be the junction of East Michigan Street and North Harbor Drive. This matched what commercial street maps were showing after many years of inaccuracies.

Between 1980 and 1992, 38 miles (61 km) of US 18/US 151 was widened to expressway standards between Dodgeville and Madison. With the exception of a bypass around Verona, it was the final piece to be completed later in 1995 at a cost of $31 million (equivalent to $58.1 million in 2024). US 12/US 18 was widened to expressway standards between I-39/I-90 to North Star Road, west of Cambridge. The remainder was not expanded but straightened out to eliminate sharp curves.

In 2019, as part of the construction to complete the Waukesha Bypass, US 18 has been rerouted as Temporary US 18 from WIS 83 in Wales, north along WIS 83 to I-94 and east along I-94 to exit 297 at Blue Mound Road where it rejoins the previous route.

That same year, two new interchanges opened in Fitchburg, replacing at-grade intersections with McKee Road (CTH PD) and Williamsburg Way.

== Major intersections ==
County	Location	mi	km	Exit	Destinations	Notes
Mississippi River		0.00	0.00		US 18 west – Marquette, Charles City	Continuation into Iowa
Mississippi River		0.00	0.00	Marquette–Joliet Bridge; Iowa–Wisconsin state line; western end of WIS 60 concurrency		
Crawford	Prairie du Chien	1.4	2.3		WIS 27 north – Eastman	
Crawford	Prairie du Chien	3.7	6.0		WIS 35 north – Lynxville	Western end of WIS 35 concurrency
Crawford	Bridgeport	7.6	12.2		WIS 60 east – Wauzeka	Eastern end of WIS 60 concurrency
Grant	Town of Patch Grove	14.3	23.0		WIS 35 south / WIS 133 south – Cassville Ferry	Eastern end of WIS 35 concurrency; western end of WIS 133 concurrency
Grant	Mount Hope	20.2	32.5		WIS 133 north – Boscobel	Eastern end of WIS 133 concurrency
Grant	Fennimore	31.1	50.1		US 61 north – Boscobel	Western end of US 61 concurrency
Grant	Fennimore	31.8	51.2		US 61 south – Lancaster	Eastern end of US 61 concurrency
Grant–Iowa county line	Montfort	43.5	70.0		WIS 80 south – Platteville	Western end of WIS 80 concurrency
Iowa	Cobb	48.5	78.1		WIS 80 north – Highland, Muscoda	Eastern end of WIS 80 concurrency
Iowa	Town of Linden	51.5	82.9		WIS 39 east – Linden, Mineral Point	
Iowa	Dodgeville	58.6	94.3		WIS 23 – Mineral Point, Spring Green	
Iowa	Town of Dodgeville	60.3	97.0	47	US 151 south – Dubuque	Western end of US 151 concurrency
Iowa	Town of Ridgeway	65.3	105.1	52	CTH-BB south (Ridgevue Road) / CTH-HHH – Ridgeway	Opened in 2018
Iowa	Barneveld	71.6	115.2	58	CTH-ID – Barneveld	
Dane	Town of Blue Mounds	78.9	127.0	65	Bus. US 18 / Bus. US 151 / WIS 78 – Mount Horeb, Blanchardville	US 18 Business / US 151 Business only signed northbound
Dane	Mount Horeb	82.2	132.3	69	Bus. US 18 / Bus. US 151 / CTH-ID – Mount Horeb	US 18 Business / US 151 Business only signed southbound
Dane	Town of Springdale	84.0	135.2	70	CTH-PD to CTH-P – Cross Plains	
Dane	Town of Verona	88.7	142.7	75	CTH-G (Dairy Ridge Road) – Mount Vernon	
Dane	Verona	89.9	144.7	76	Bus. US 18 / Bus. US 151 / CTH-MV (W. Verona Avenue) / Epic Lane	US 18 Business / US 151 Business only signed eastbound
Dane	Verona	91.0	146.5	77	WIS 69 south – Belleville, New Glarus	
Dane	Verona	92.7	149.2	79	CTH-PB to CTH-M / Alt. US 18 / Alt. US 151 – Paoli, Oregon	Alternate US 18 and Alternate US 151 only signed eastbound
Dane	Town of Verona	94.0	151.3	81	Bus. US 18 / Bus. US 151 / CTH-MV – Verona	Southbound exit and northbound entrance only
Dane	Fitchburg	96.4	155.1	83A	CTH-PD (McKee Road)	
Dane	Fitchburg	97.0	156.1	83B	Williamsburg Way	
Dane	Madison	98.2	158.0	258	US 12 west / US 14 west (Beltline Highway) / Midvale Boulevard – Dodgeville	Western end of US 12 and US 14 concurrencys.
Dane	Madison	98.7	158.8	258A	Seminole Highway	Westbound exit and eastbound entrance only
Dane	Madison	99.8	160.6	259	Todd Drive	
Dane	Madison	100.6	161.9	260	CTH-D (Fish Hatchery Road)	Eastbound exits signed 260A (south) and 260B (north)
Dane	Madison	101.3	163.0	261	US 14 east / US 151 north (Park Street) / Alt. US 18 / Alt. US 151 – Oregon	Eastern end of US 14 and US 151 concurrencys; Alternate US 18 and Alternate US 151 only signed eastbound
Dane	Madison	102.1	164.3	262	CTH-MM (Rimrock Road)	
Dane	Madison	102.6	165.1	263	John Nolen Drive	
Dane	Monona	103.4	166.4	264	CTH-BW east (West Broadway)	
Dane	Monona	104.9	168.8	265	Monona Drive	
Dane	Madison	105.8	170.3	266	US 51 (Stoughton Road)	
Dane	Madison	107.3	172.7	267	I-39 / I-90 to I-94 – Janesville, Chicago, Wisconsin Dells, Milwaukee	Signed as exits 267A (east/south) and 267B (west/north); I-39 / I-90 exit 142
Dane	Madison	108.9	175.3	269	CTH-AB	
Dane	Town of Cottage Grove	111.4	179.3	272	CTH-N – Cottage Grove, Stoughton	
Dane	Town of Deerfield	118.0	189.9		WIS 73 – Deerfield, Edgerton	Interchange
Dane	Cambridge	121.1	194.9		WIS 134 north	
Dane	Cambridge	121.2	195.1		US 12 east – Fort Atkinson	Eastern end of US 12 concurrency
Jefferson	Town of Jefferson	129.8	208.9		WIS 89 north – Lake Mills	Western end of WIS 89 concurrency
Jefferson	Town of Jefferson	130.2	209.5		WIS 89 south – Fort Atkinson	Eastern end of WIS 89 concurrency
Jefferson	Town of Jefferson	130.8	210.5		WIS 26 – Fort Atkinson, Johnson Creek	Interchange
Jefferson	Jefferson	132.2	212.8		Bus. WIS 26 (Main Street)	
Waukesha	Dousman	150.8	242.7		WIS 67 – Oconomowoc, Eagle	
Waukesha	Wales	155.0	249.4		WIS 83 – Hartland, Mukwonago	Roundabout
Waukesha	Waukesha	160.1	257.7		WIS 318 north (Meadowbrook Road) CTH-TT south (Merlin Hills Road)	
Waukesha	Waukesha	165.7	266.7		WIS 164 south	Western end of WIS 164 concurrency
Waukesha	Waukesha	171.3	275.7		I-94 / WIS 164 north – Milwaukee, Madison	Eastern end of WIS 164 concurrency
Milwaukee	Wauwatosa	177.6	285.8		WIS 100 (N. 108th Street)	
Milwaukee	Wauwatosa	178.3	286.9		I-41 / US 41 / US 45	
Milwaukee	Wauwatosa	179.2	288.4		WIS 181 (Glenview Avenue)	
Milwaukee	Milwaukee	181.6	292.3		To WIS 175 / Wisconsin Avenue	
Milwaukee	Milwaukee	183.1	294.7		WIS 57 south (N. 27th Street)	Western end of WIS 57 concurrency
Milwaukee	Milwaukee	183.6	295.5		WIS 57 north (N. 20th Street)	Eastern end of WIS 57 concurrency
Milwaukee	Milwaukee	184.5	296.9		I-43 north – Green Bay	Northbound I-43 entrance and southbound I-43 exit only
Milwaukee	Milwaukee	184.8	297.4		WIS 145 north (N. 6th Street)	Western end of WIS 145 concurrency
Milwaukee	Milwaukee	185.1	297.9		WIS 145 ends	Eastern end of WIS 145 concurrency
Milwaukee	Milwaukee	185.4	298.4		WIS 32 north / LMCT (E. Wells Street)	Western end of WIS 32 concurrency
Milwaukee	Milwaukee				WIS 32 south / LMCT (E. Michigan Street)	Eastern end of WIS 32 concurrency
Milwaukee	Milwaukee				Lincoln Memorial Drive	
1.000 mi = 1.609 km; 1.000 km = 0.621 mi: Concurrency terminus; Incomplete access

== See also ==
U.S. Route 18
Previous state: Iowa	Wisconsin	Next state: Terminus
