= Wisconsin Highway 10 =

State Trunk Highway 10

Route information
- Maintained by WisDOT
- Existed: 1918–1926

Location
- Country: United States
- State: Wisconsin

Highway system
- Wisconsin State Trunk Highway System; Interstate; US; State; Scenic; Rustic
← US 10	→ WIS 11

Wisconsin Highway 10 (WIS 10) was a state trunk highway that traveled roughly along the following present-day routes:

- U.S. Highway 51: WIS 10 traveled along the entirety of US 51 in Wisconsin.
- U.S. Highway 2: WIS 10 traveled along most of the western portion of US 2 from Ironwood to Superior.
