= Wisconsin Highway 49 =

Highway in Wisconsin

State Trunk Highway 49
- WIS 49 highlighted

Route information
- Maintained by WisDOT
- Length: 127.52 mi (205.22 km)

Major junctions
- South end: I-41 / US 41 / CTH-KK in Lomira
- US 151 in Waupun; US 10 / WIS 110 in Fremont; US 10 / WIS 54 in Waupaca
- North end: WIS 29 in Elderon

Location
- Country: United States
- State: Wisconsin
- Counties: Dodge, Fond du Lac, Green Lake, Waushara, Waupaca, Portage, Marathon

Highway system
- Wisconsin State Trunk Highway System; Interstate; US; State; Scenic; Rustic
← WIS 48	→ WIS 50

State Trunk Highway 49 (often called Highway 49, STH-49 or WIS 49) is a state highway in the U.S. state of Wisconsin. It runs north–south in central and southeast Wisconsin from Wittenberg to Lomira. The highway was initially designated in 1917, but it had not been extended to its current length until the 1950s.

== Route description ==
WIS 49 begins at an interchange with Interstate 41 (I-41) north of Lomira and runs west from it, passing through Brownsville before curving to the north to meet the Dodge-Fond du Lac county line. After an interchange with US 151, WIS 49 runs through Waupun. Shortly after exiting Waupun, the highway curves and starts running north to Brandon. Shortly after exiting Brandon, the highway runs concurrently with WIS 44. This concurrency ends in Ripon, where a concurrency with WIS 23 begins. The highway runs north from the concurrent alignment shortly before it reaches Green Lake. While running north, WIS 49 runs through Berlin and many smaller communities before reaching an interchange at US 10.

The highway runs concurrently with US 10, which is a freeway for most of its length. The highway passes by Weyauwega and the Waupaca Municipal Airport before leaving the concurrency and running through Waupaca. After exiting Waupaca, it runs north to Scandinavia and then to Iola, where the highway enters runs concurrently for a short distance with WIS 161. WIS 49 then runs northwesterly to WIS 66 before continuing north, passing through an intersection with WIS 153 in Elderon before terminating at WIS 29.

== History ==
When Wisconsin's state trunk highways were first designated in 1917, the highway ran from WIS 23 near Green Lake to WIS 18 (by 1930, this had become US 10) south of Waupaca. In the early 1920s, WIS 49 was extended south to Waupun. By 1930, the highway had been extended to its current northern terminus at WIS 29, and it was paved south of Poy Sippi (between WIS 21 and US 10). In 1933, the section between Poy Sippi and US 10 was paved. Sometime between 1948 and 1956, the highway had been extended to US 41 (now I-41/US 41). The extension was mostly paved but contained an unpaved section west of Brownsville.

== Major junctions ==
County	Location	mi	km	Exit	Destinations	Notes
Dodge	Town of Lomira	0.00	0.00		I-41 (US 41) – Fond du Lac, Green Bay, Milwaukee	Southern terminus; I-41 exit 87; road continues east as CTH-KK
Dodge	Town of Lomira	0.7	1.1		WIS 175 – Lomira, Fond du Lac	
Dodge–Fond du Lac county line	Chester–Waupun town line	14.5	23.3		US 151 – Madison, Fond du Lac	Diamond interchange; US 151 exit 146
Dodge–Fond du Lac county line	Waupun	15.0	24.1		WIS 26 (Watertown Street)	
Dodge–Fond du Lac county line	Waupun	15.1	24.3		Fond Du Lac Street (Bus. US 151 north) / Carrington Street	Eastern end of Bus. US 151 concurrency
Dodge–Fond du Lac county line	Waupun	15.2	24.5		Madison Street (Bus. US 151 south)	Western end of Bus. US 151 concurrency
Dodge–Fond du Lac county line	Waupun	16.2	26.1		WIS 68 west (Fox Lake Road) – Fox Lake	
Fond du Lac	Metomen	26.9	43.3		WIS 44 south – Fairwater	Southern end of WIS 44 concurrency
Fond du Lac	Ripon	34.3	55.2		WIS 23 east / WIS 44 north (Fond du Lac Street east)	Northern end of WIS 44 concurrency; southern end of WIS 23 concurrency
Fond du Lac	Ripon	35.4	57.0		Union Street to WIS 44 north	
Green Lake	Green Lake–Brooklyn line	40.2	64.7		WIS 23 west / CTH-A south – Green Lake, Princeton	Northern end of WIS 23 concurrency
Green Lake	Berlin	48.2	77.6		WIS 91 east – Oshkosh	
Waushara	Aurora	54.3	87.4		WIS 21 – Redgranite, Omro	
Waupaca	Fremont	72.6	116.8		US 10 east / WIS 110 south – Fremont, Appleton	Interchange; southern end of US 10/WIS 110 concurrency; US 10 exit 264
Waupaca	Weyauwega	76.2	122.6	260B	CTH-F north – Weyauwega	Interchange; exit numbers follow US 10; northbound exit and southbound entrance
Waupaca	Weyauwega	77.2	124.2	260A	WIS 110 north / CTH-X – Weyauwega	Interchange; northern end of WIS 110 concurrency
Waupaca	Waupaca	82.2	132.3	254	WIS 22 north / WIS 54 east / CTH-A south / CTH-K north – Waupaca, New London	South end of freeway section; eastern end of WIS 22/WIS 54 concurrency; access to Waupaca Municipal Airport
Waupaca	Town of Waupaca	83.8	134.9	253	Churchill Street	
Waupaca	Waupaca	85.2	137.1	252	WIS 22 south – Wild Rose	Western end of WIS 22 concurrency
Waupaca	Farmington–Waupaca line	86.4	139.0		US 10 west / WIS 54 west – Wisconsin Rapids, Stevens Point	Northern end of US 10/WIS 54 concurrency; north end of freeway section; US 10 exit 250
Waupaca	Iola	99.9	160.8		WIS 161 east – Symco	Southern end of WIS 161 concurrency
Waupaca	Iola	100.5	161.7		WIS 161 west – Nelsonville	Northern end of WIS 161 concurrency
Portage	Alban	113.8	183.1		WIS 66 west – Rosholt, Stevens Point	
Marathon	Elderon	125.1	201.3		WIS 153 – Mosinee	
Marathon	Town of Elderon	128.1	206.2		WIS 29 – Wausau, Wittenberg	Northern terminus; road continues as Black Willow Drive
1.000 mi = 1.609 km; 1.000 km = 0.621 mi: Concurrency terminus; Incomplete access
