= Wisconsin Highway 110 =

Highway in Wisconsin

State Trunk Highway 110
- WIS 110 highlighted in red

Route information
- Maintained by WisDOT
- Length: 37.44 mi (60.25 km)
- Existed: 1939–present

Major junctions
- South end: US 10 / WIS 96 / CTH-II in Fremont
- US 10 / WIS 49 in Fremont; US 10 / WIS 49 in Weyauwega
- North end: US 45 in Marion

Location
- Country: United States
- State: Wisconsin
- Counties: Waupaca, Shawano

Highway system
- Wisconsin State Trunk Highway System; Interstate; US; State; Scenic; Rustic
← WIS 109	→ WIS 111

State Trunk Highway 110 (often called Highway 110, STH-110 or WIS 110) is a state highway in the US state of Wisconsin. It runs north–south in central Wisconsin from Fremont to Marion. Its southern terminus is at US Highway 10 (US 10) and WIS 96 southeast of Fremont; its northern terminus is at US 45 in Marion.

== Route description ==
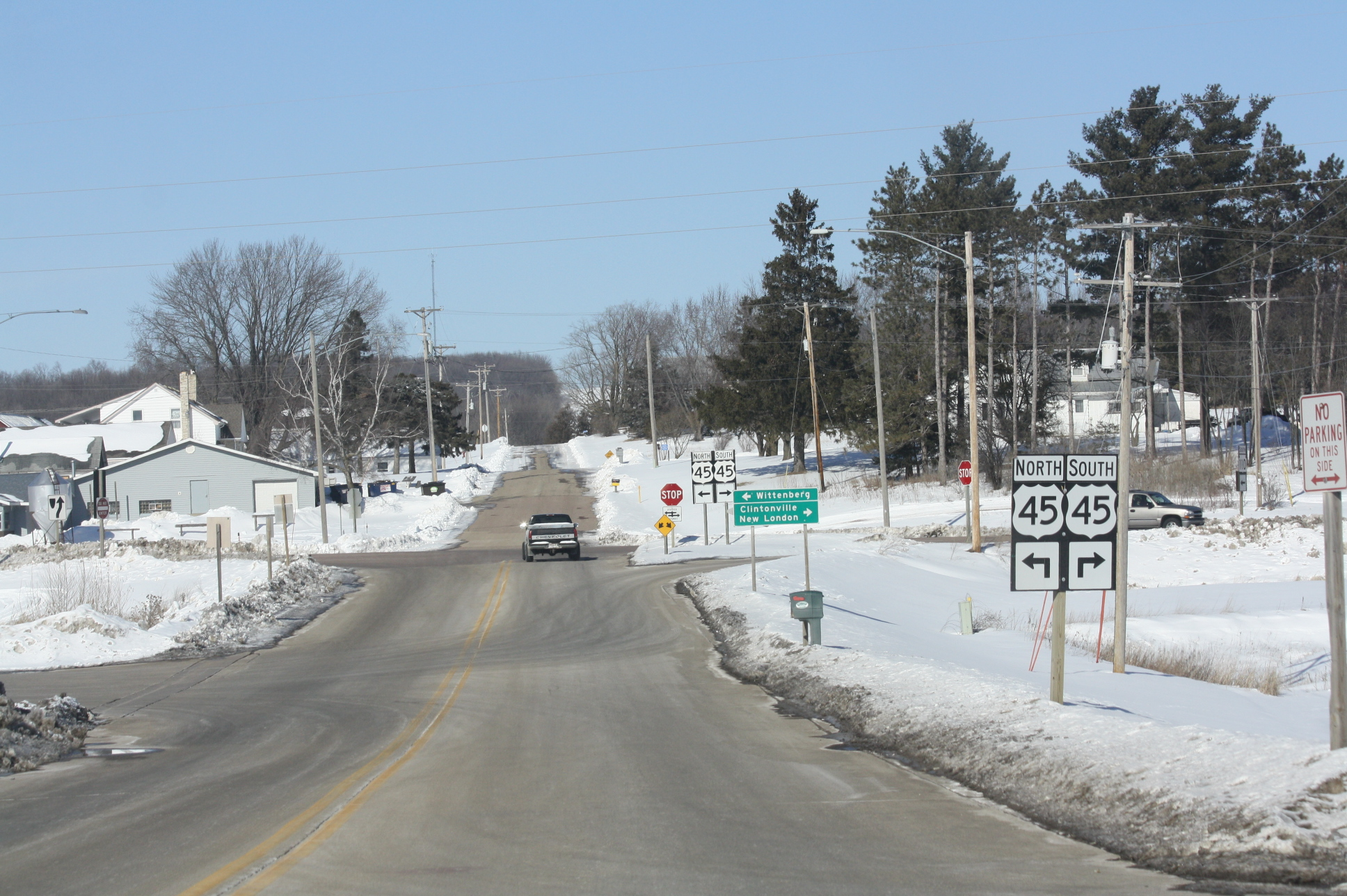
Northern terminus at US 45

The highway begins at an intersection with US 10 and WIS 96 southeast of Fremont. It heads north from US 10 for about half a mile before turning westward. It passes through Fremont and heads to the northwest before turning to the south toward US 10 and WIS 49.

The highway then runs concurrently to the north with US 10 and WIS 49 for about five miles (8.0 km). It then splits off and heads northward into Weyauwega. After it leaves the city, the highway continues to the northwest, where it will meet with WIS 22 and WIS 54. It runs concurrently to the north along both highways before WIS 54 splits off. WIS 110 and WIS 54 continue concurrently northward, passing through Manawa. North of Manawa, the highways split and WIS 110 continues to the north. Further along, it enters Marion, where it terminates at US 45.

== History ==
U.S. Highway 110
- Location: Oshkosh to east of Fremont
- Length: 40 mi (64 km)
- Existed: 1926–1938

In 1925, the original proposed number for a United States Numbered Highway to run from Oshkosh to Fremont, Wisconsin, was U.S. Route 112. However, the number approved for the route in 1926 was U.S. Route 110 (US 110). (Note: The US 112 designation was swapped with US 110 and applied to an entirely different route in Indiana and Michigan.)

This route, which would be the forerunner of WIS 110, started out as a 40-mile (64 km) long south-to-north US Highway located entirely within Wisconsin. The southern terminus of the route was at US 41 (now the intersection of US 45 and WIS 76) in Oshkosh. The northern terminus was at US 10 (now the northern terminus of the WIS 96/WIS 110 concurrency) east of Fremont.

US 110 was deleted in 1939 and subsequently replaced with WIS 110. Due to a series of extensions and truncations in the 70 years since, however, WIS 110 is no longer designated on most of the former routing of US 110. Today, what was once US 110 is now US 45 from Oshkosh to Winchester, CTH-II from Winchester to US 10 southeast of Fremont, and WIS 110 from US 10 to WIS 96 east of Fremont.

== Major intersections ==
County	Location	mi	km	Destinations	Notes
Waupaca		0.00	0.00	US 10 / WIS 96 east – Waupaca, Stevens Point, Appleton	Southern terminus
Waupaca		3.60	5.79	US 10 east / WIS 49 south – Appleton, Berlin	WIS 110 leaves US 10 southbound and enters northbound
Waupaca		7.20	11.59	US 10 west / WIS 49 north – Waupaca, Stevens Point	WIS 110 leaves US 10/WIS 49 northbound and enters southbound
Waupaca		13.10	21.08	WIS 22 south / WIS 54 west – Waupaca	WIS 110 leaves WIS 22/WIS 54 southbound and enters northbound
Waupaca		15.40	24.78	WIS 54 east – New London	WIS 54 leaves concurrency northbound and enters southbound; WIS 22 continues concurrency
Waupaca		21.10	33.96	WIS 22 north / WIS 161 west – Iola, Symco, Clintonville	WIS 110 leaves WIS 22 northbound and enters southbound
Shawano	Marion	37.44	60.25	US 45 – Wittenberg, Clintonville, New London	Northern terminus
1.000 mi = 1.609 km; 1.000 km = 0.621 mi: Concurrency terminus
