= Wisconsin Highway 161 =

State highway in Wisconsin, United States

State Trunk Highway 161
- WIS 161 highlighted in red

Route information
- Maintained by WisDOT
- Length: 22.42 mi (36.08 km)
- Existed: 1923–present

Major junctions
- West end: US 10 near Amherst Junction
- WIS 49 in Iola
- East end: WIS 22 / WIS 110 near Symco

Location
- Country: United States
- State: Wisconsin
- Counties: Portage, Waupaca

Highway system
- Wisconsin State Trunk Highway System; Interstate; US; State; Scenic; Rustic
← WIS 160	→ WIS 162

State Trunk Highway 161 (often called Highway 161, STH-161 or WIS 161) is a 22.42-mile (36.08 km) state highway in Portage and Waupaca counties in the central part of the US state of Wisconsin. It runs in east–west from US Highway 10 (US 10) northwest of Amherst Junction via Iola to WIS 22/WIS 110 just west of Symco.

== Route description ==
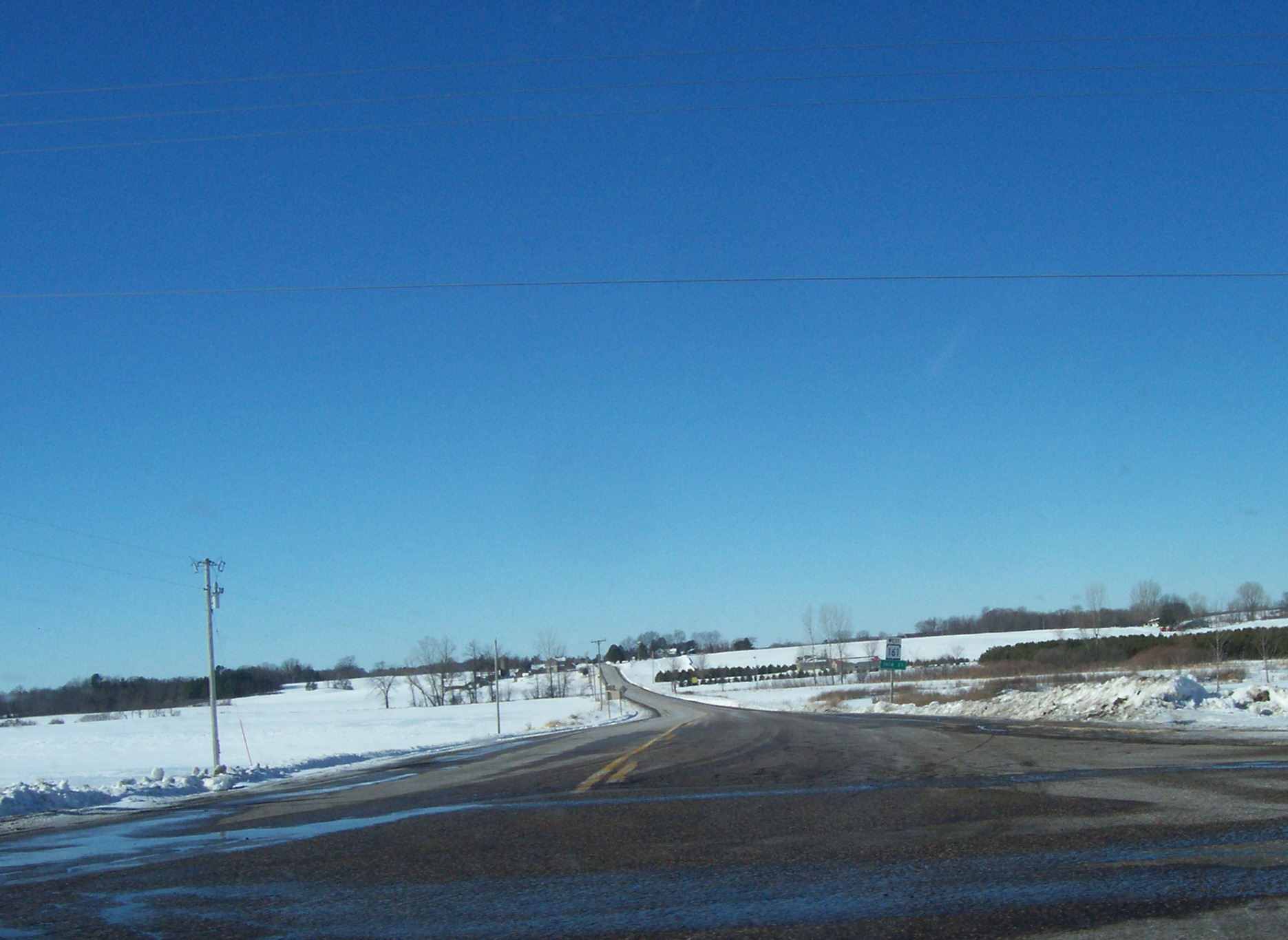
Looking west from the eastern terminus of WIS 161, just west of Symco, February 2001

Starting at US 10 between Custer and Amherst Junction, WIS 161 begins to proceed eastward. It then passes Nelsonville and then New Hope. In Iola, WIS 161 briefly runs concurrently with WIS 49. Continuing eastward, WIS 161 then ends at WIS 22/WIS 110 near Symco.

== History ==
Initially, in 1923, WIS 161 traveled from WIS 18 (later US 10; now CTH-KK) Amherst Junction to WIS 22 near Symco. Then, in 1926, with the creation of US 10 and the removal of WIS 18, WIS 161 was truncated from Amherst Junction to Nelsonville. This was done in favor of US 10's direct connection to Nelsonville. Later, US 10 lost its connection to Nelsonville and instead bypassed it. As a result, WIS 161 extended west to US 10's new alignment. WIS 161's former connection was then transferred to local control (replaced by CTH-A, now CTH-Q). However, by 1935, that change was reverted.

In 1951, WIS 161 was then reverted to its original routing as a result of US 10's reversion to its 1927–1935 routing. Since 2007, WIS 161 has moved off from Amherst Junction.

== Major intersections ==
County	Location	mi	km	Destinations	Notes
Portage		0.0	0.0	US 10 – Stevens Point, Waupaca, Appleton	Western terminus
Waupaca	Iola	12.31	19.81	WIS 49 north – Elderon	Western end of WIS 49 concurrency
Waupaca	Iola	12.90	20.76	WIS 49 south – Scandinavia	Eastern end of WIS 49 concurrency
Waupaca		22.42	36.08	WIS 22 / WIS 110 – Marion, Manawa, Clintonville	Eastern terminus
1.000 mi = 1.609 km; 1.000 km = 0.621 mi: Concurrency terminus
