= Wisconsin Highway 22 =

Highway in Wisconsin

State Trunk Highway 22
- WIS 22 highlighted in red

Route information
- Maintained by WisDOT
- Length: 171.6 mi (276.2 km)

Major junctions
- South end: US 51 / WIS 60 in Arlington
- US 10 / WIS 49 / WIS 54 in Waupaca: US 45 / WIS 76 in Bear Creek; US 45 in Clintonville; US 141 in Stiles
- North end: US 41 / LMCT in Oconto

Location
- Country: United States
- State: Wisconsin
- Counties: Columbia, Marquette, Waushara, Portage, Waupaca, Shawano, Oconto

Highway system
- Wisconsin State Trunk Highway System; Interstate; US; State; Scenic; Rustic
| ← WIS 21 | → WIS 23 |

State Trunk Highway 22 (often called Highway 22, STH-22 or WIS 22) is a state highway in the U.S. state of Wisconsin. The route's trajectory is mostly south to north, with the exception of the segment between Shawano and the northern terminus which is east–west. It is generally a two-lane surface road providing a connecting route between Waupaca, Shawano, Gillett and Oconto. Various urban sections have multilane segments.

== Route description ==
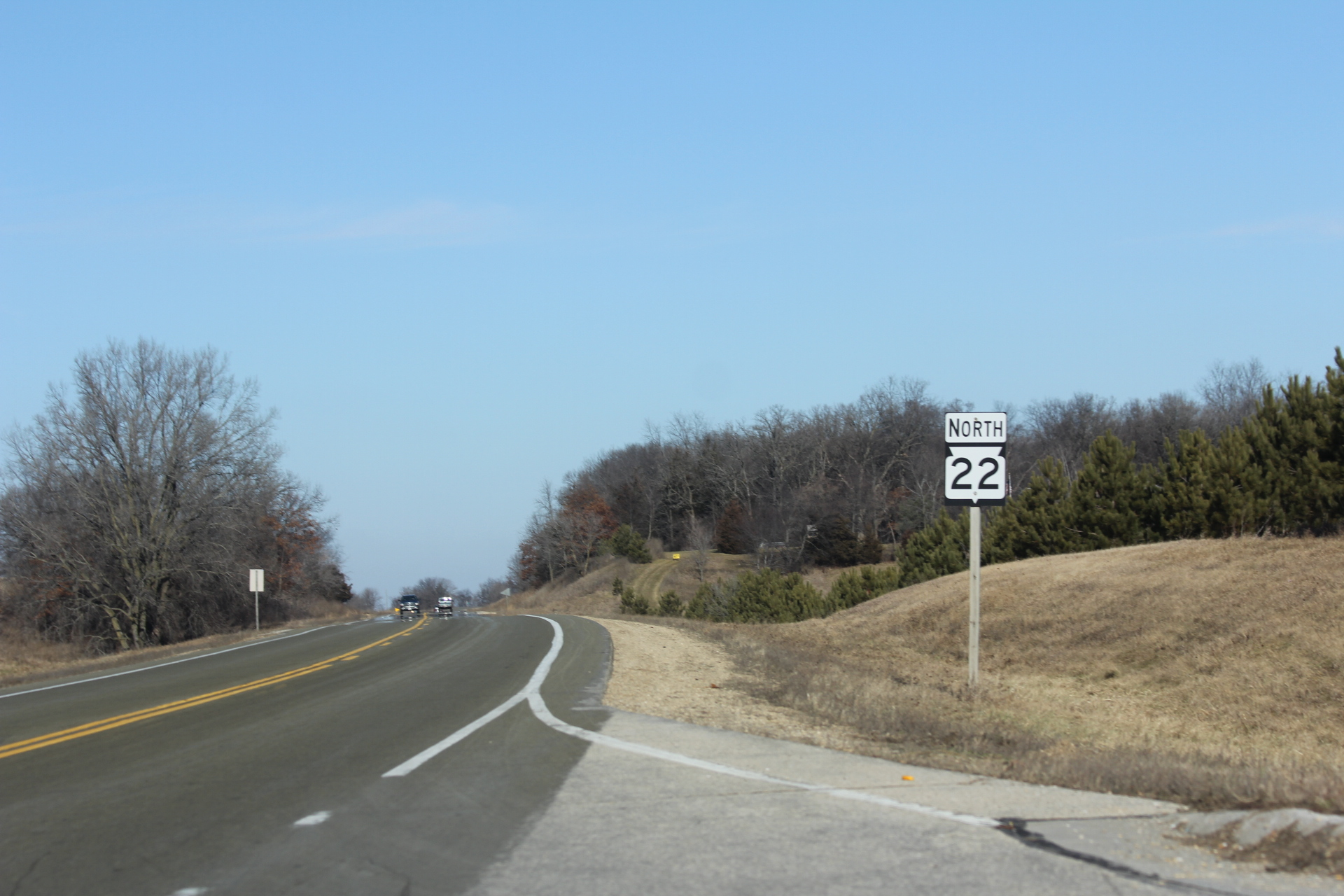
WIS 22 in Columbia County

WIS 22's southern terminus is located in Columbia County at the junction of US 51 and WIS 60 in North Leeds, two miles (3.2 km) east of Arlington. From there the route heads north for twelve miles (19 km) and crosses WIS 16 at Wyocena. At another four miles (6.4 km) further north, the highway junctions with WIS 44 in Pardeeville and WIS 33 two miles (3.2 km) north of Pardeeville. The highway crosses into Marquette County at CTH CM.

WIS 22 passes north through the eastern portion of Marquette County where it meets WIS 23 in Montello. There is a short cosigning with 23 in town heading east before 22 turns north again. The highway then joins WIS 21 briefly in Wautoma. Both routes cross WIS 73 in the downtown area and WIS 21 splits southeast following WIS 73 while WIS 22 continues north, passing through Wild Rose eight miles (13 km) north of Wautoma. WIS 22 passes through the southeast corner of Portage County for about one mile (1.6 km) as it turns eastward. The highway stairsteps northeast for about nine miles (14 km), passing around Rural and King as it proceeds toward Waupaca. WIS 22 merges onto US 10 east (also carrying WIS 49 south and WIS 54 east) for one and a half miles, forming a brief wrong-way concurrency with WIS 49. Along with WIS 54, WIS 22 turns off US 10 to the north and into the city via Churchill Street. The two highways then turn east onto Royalton Street southeast of the city center and follow the Little Wolf River's south branch northeast.

WIS 110 joins the two highway five miles east of Waupaca, and WIS 54 turns east off the route two miles (3.2 km) northeast of that point to continue following the river. WIS 22 and WIS 110 pass through Manawa and junction with WIS 161 west four miles (6.4 km) north of the city. WIS 110 continues north at that point while WIS 22 turns east and passes through the small community of Symco. WIS 22 turns north onto US 45 where WIS 76 begins nine miles (14 km) east of Symco. WIS 22 continues north along US 45 for 6 miles (9.7 km) then splits north while US 45 turns west in Clintonville. The western terminus of WIS 156 connects with the route one mile (1.6 km) north of the US 45 junction. WIS 22 passes through Embarrass on the Shawano County line.

WIS 22 passes northwest of the small communities of Adams Beach and Belle Plaine as it turns northeast and approaches Shawano. WIS 22 junctions with WIS 29 southwest of the city and passes into the city itself along Main Street. The highway turns east onto Green Bay Street, joining WIS 47 and Wisconsin Highway 55 south for two miles (3.2 km) within the city. WIS 47 and WIS 55 then turn south onto Airport Road and WIS 22 passes northeast around the southeast side of Shawano Lake and through Cecil, junctioning with WIS 117. The highway enters Oconto County at Pulcifer.

WIS 22 joins WIS 32 south in Gillett and the two routes run concurrent for three miles (4.8 km) east to where WIS 32 turns south off while WIS 22 continues east, passing through Oconto Falls. In 2014, an 8.1-mile stretch of STH 22 between Gillett and Oconto Falls was honored with the Sheldon G. Hayes Award for being the smoothest asphalt pavement in the country. The highway crosses US 141 in Stiles Junction eight miles (13 km) west of its eastern terminus at US 41 in Oconto. The terminus is adjacent to Copper Culture State Park.

== History ==
WIS 22's original route follows the current route from Wautoma to Oconto, not including any reroutes that were in place such as the one around Waupaca. The segment south of Wautoma was opened in 1947. The eastern terminus changed in 2015 to the new US 41 bypass around Oconto, shortening the highway's length by about 0.6 miles (0.97 km). The previous terminus extended to what is now Bus. US 41 and County Trunk Highway Y (CTH-Y).

== Major intersections ==
| County | Location | mi | km | Destinations | Notes |
|---|---|---|---|---|---|
| Columbia | North Leeds | | | US 51 / WIS 60 – Lodi, Madison, Columbus | |
| Columbia | Wyocena | | | WIS 16 – Portage, Columbus | |
| Columbia | Pardeeville | | | WIS 44 north (Lake St) | Southern terminus of WIS 44 |
| Columbia | Pardeeville | | | WIS 33 – Portage, Fox Lake | |
| Marquette | Montello | | | WIS 23 – Oxford, WIS Dells, Princeton | A brief cosign with 23 for under 1/2 mile in Montello. |
| Waushara | Wautoma | | | WIS 21 west – Coloma | Southern end of WIS 21 concurrency |
| Waushara | Wautoma | | | WIS 21 east / WIS 73 – WIS Rapids, Princeton, Oshkosh | Northern end of WIS 21 concurrency |
| Waushara | Wild Rose | | | CTH-A | |
| Portage | No major junctions | | | | |
| Waupaca | Waupaca | | | US 10 west / WIS 49 north / WIS 54 west – Stevens Point | esstern end of US 10/WIS 49/WIS 54 concurrency |
| Waupaca | Waupaca | | | US 10 east / WIS 49 south – Fremont, Appleton | Eastern end of US 10/WIS 49 concurrency |
| Waupaca | | | | WIS 110 south – Weyauwega | Southern end of WIS 110 concurrency |
| Waupaca | | | | WIS 54 east – New London | Northern end of WIS 54 concurrency |
| Waupaca | Manawa | | | CTH-B | |
| Waupaca | Symco | | | WIS 110 north / WIS 161 west – Iola, Marion | Northern end of WIS 110 concurrency |
| Waupaca | Clintonville | | | US 45 south / WIS 76 south – Bear Creek, New London | Southern end of US 45 concurrency |
| Waupaca | Clintonville | | | US 45 north – Antigo | Northern end of US 45 concurrency |
| Waupaca | Clintonville | | | WIS 156 east (Green Tree Rd) | Western terminus of WIS 156 |
| Waupaca | Embarrass | | | CTH-C | |
| Shawano | Belle Plaine | | | CTH-Y | |
| Shawano | Shawano | | | WIS 29 – Wausau, Green Bay | |
| Shawano | Shawano | | | WIS 47 north / WIS 55 north / CTH-MMM | Western end of WIS 47/WIS 55 concurrency |
| Shawano | Shawano | | | WIS 47 south / WIS 55 south | Eastern end of WIS 47/WIS 55 concurrency |
| Shawano | Shawano | | | CTH-BE | |
| Shawano | Cecil | | | WIS 117 south – Bonduel | Northern terminus of WIS 117 |
| Shawano | Cecil | | | CTH-R | |
| Shawano | Pulcifer | | | CTH-C | |
| Oconto | Gillett | | | WIS 32 north – Suring, Mountain | Western end of WIS 32 concurrency |
| Oconto | Gillett | | | WIS 32 south – Green Bay | Eastern end of WIS 32 concurrency |
| Oconto | Oconto Falls | | | CTH-B | |
| Oconto | Oconto Falls | | | CTH-I | |
| Oconto | Stiles Junction | | | US 141 – Crivitz, Green Bay | |
| Oconto | | | | CTH-J | |
| Oconto | Oconto | | | US 41 / LMCT – Marinette, Green Bay; CTH-Y – Oconto | |
1.000 mi = 1.609 km; 1.000 km = 0.621 mi: Concurrency terminus
