= Wisconsin Highway 54 =

Highway in Wisconsin

State Trunk Highway 54
- Wisconsin Firefighters and Emergency Medical Technicians Highway
- WIS-54 highlighted in red

Route information
- Maintained by WisDOT
- Length: 243.12 mi (391.26 km)

Major junctions
- West end: MN 43 west of Marshland
- US 53 / WIS 93 in Galesville; US 12 / WIS 27 in Black River Falls; I-94 in Black River Falls; I-39 / US 51 in Plover; US 10 / WIS 22 / WIS 49 in Waupaca; US 45 in New London; I-41 / US 41 / WIS 32 in Green Bay; US 141 / WIS 29 / WIS 57 in Green Bay; I-43 / LMCT in Green Bay
- East end: WIS 42 / LMCT in Algoma

Location
- Country: United States
- State: Wisconsin
- Counties: Buffalo, Trempealeau, Jackson, Wood, Portage, Waupaca, Outagamie, Brown, Kewaunee

Highway system
- Wisconsin State Trunk Highway System; Interstate; US; State; Scenic; Rustic
← WIS 53	→ WIS 55

State Trunk Highway 54 (often called Highway 54, STH-54 or WIS 54) is a Wisconsin state highway running east–west across central Wisconsin. It is 243.12 miles (391.26 km) in length.

== Route description ==
=== Minnesota state line to Plover ===
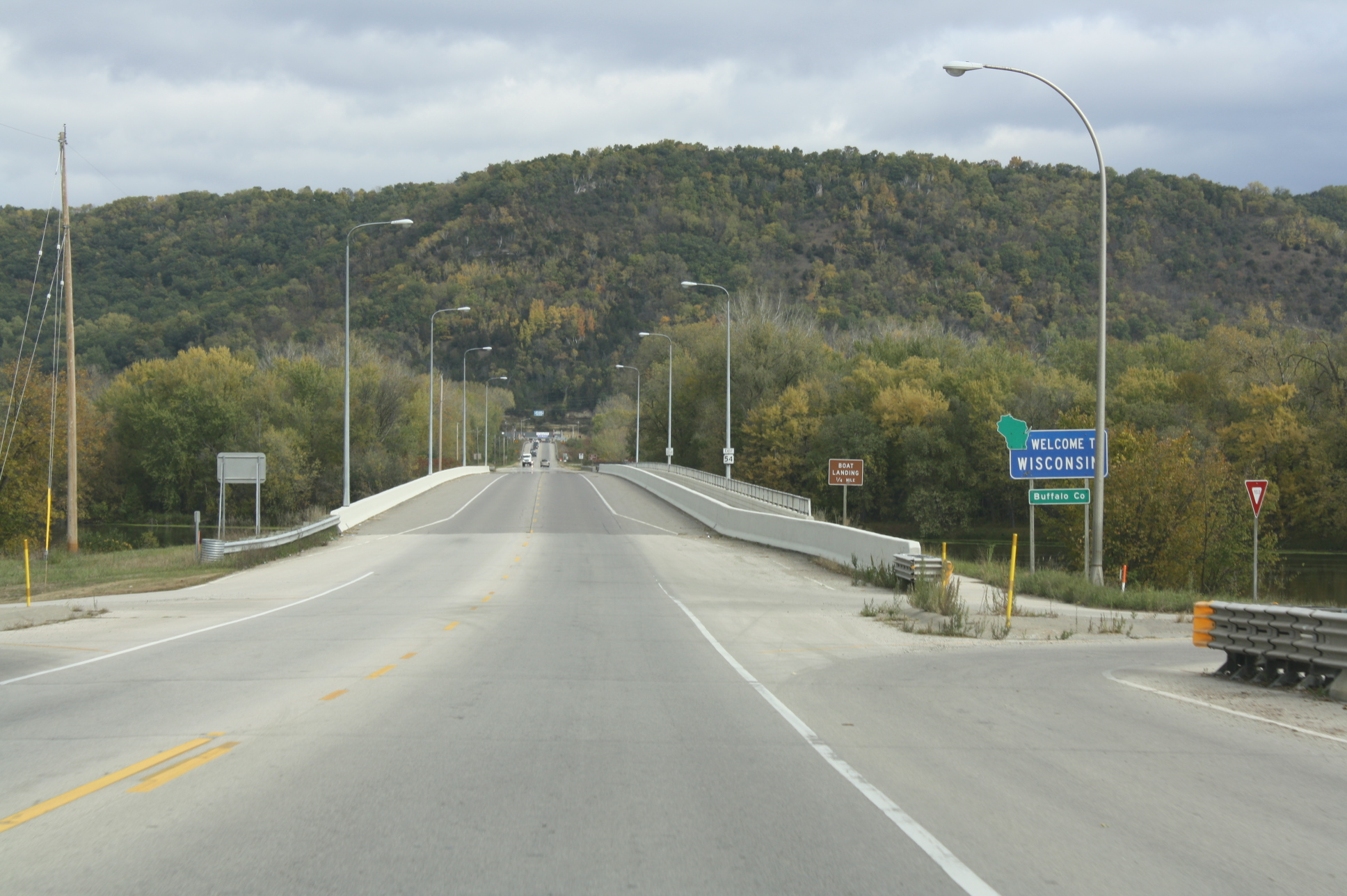
West terminus

WIS 54 begins at the western terminus. It crosses through the Minnesota state line at Winona, Minnesota via the North Channel Bridge. At this bridge, MN 43 ends there. After crossing the bridge, it soon turns east via WIS 35/Great River Road. In Centerville, WIS 35, as well as the Great River Road, turn southward; leaves the concurrency. At the same junction, WIS 93 joins the concurrency eastward. Further east, they then start to run concurrently with US 53 in Galesville. However, as they travel eastward, WIS 54 turns northeast, leaving the concurrency.

At Butman Corners, WIS 54 then turns east again. After leaving Butman Corners, it closely parallels the Black River just south of the route. Then, it meanders eastward towards Melrose. In Melrose, it meets WIS 71/WIS 108 where they end. Continuing north, it continues to parallel the river. In Black River Falls, it briefly runs concurrently with US 12 and WIS 27 on the bridge. After crossing the bridge, WIS 54 becomes a four-lane divided highway. At that point, it no longer follows the river.

Going east, it then meets I-94 at a diamond interchange. After leaving Vaudreuil out northeast, WIS 54 then downgrades into a two-lane undivided highway. Then, it continues going eastward. At Dexterville, WIS 54 briefly traveled southward via WIS 80. Continuing eastward, WIS 54 then runs concurrently with WIS 73 from Port Edward to Wisconsin Rapids. At the start of the concurrency, it, as well as WIS 73, starts to follows the Wisconsin River. In Wisconsin Rapids, WIS 54 turns east, following WIS 13. This concurrency with WIS 13 runs from the west end of the Wisconsin River bridge to 8th Street. WIS 54 then turns north near the city limit. At Robinson Park, WIS 54 curves east, and - passing 64th Street - becomes a four-lane, divided highway with a 65-mph (104 km/h) speed limit to just outside Plover. Although it still closely parallels the river, it is now on the east/south side of the river. At Plover, WIS 54 then turns southeast via Bus. US 51. At that point, it no longer follows the river again.

=== Plover to Algoma ===
Continuing southeast, both routes continue to run concurrently until they meet I-39/US 51 interchange. At that point, Bus. US 51 ends there. WIS 54 continues to travel southeast. However, at one point, it then turns east towards Waupaca. At Waupaca, WIS 54 runs concurrently with US 10 as well as WIS 49. At the next interchange out east, WIS 22 joins the concurrency. Just west of the Waupaca Municipal Airport, WIS 54 and WIS 22 leaves the concurrency. Continuing northeast, they then run concurrently with WIS 110 for 2.3 miles (3.7 km). After WIS 110, as well as WIS 22, leaves the concurrency, WIS 54 then travels east. Near the Newton Blackmour State Trail in New London, US 45 meets WIS 54 at a parclo. At that point, the route parallels the state trail.

In Shiocton, WIS 76 briefly runs concurrently with WIS 54. East of the concurrency, it intersects WIS 187. In Black Creek, it intersects WIS 47. South of Seymour, WIS 55 travels eastward via WIS 54 for 2 miles (3.2 km). After WIS 55 turns south, WIS 54 enters the Oneida Reservation. It then turns northeast after intersecting with WIS 172.

After entering Green Bay, WIS 54 becomes a four-lane divided highway. After that, it turns eastward. At the dumbbell interchange, WIS 54 meets I-41/US 41 while WIS 32 runs concurrently with WIS 54. As they get close to downtown, WIS 32 leaves southward while WIS 54 becomes a limited-access road. After crossing a bascule bridge above the Fox River, WIS 54 leaves Mason Street for Monroe Street. At that point, WIS 54 runs concurrently with WIS 57.

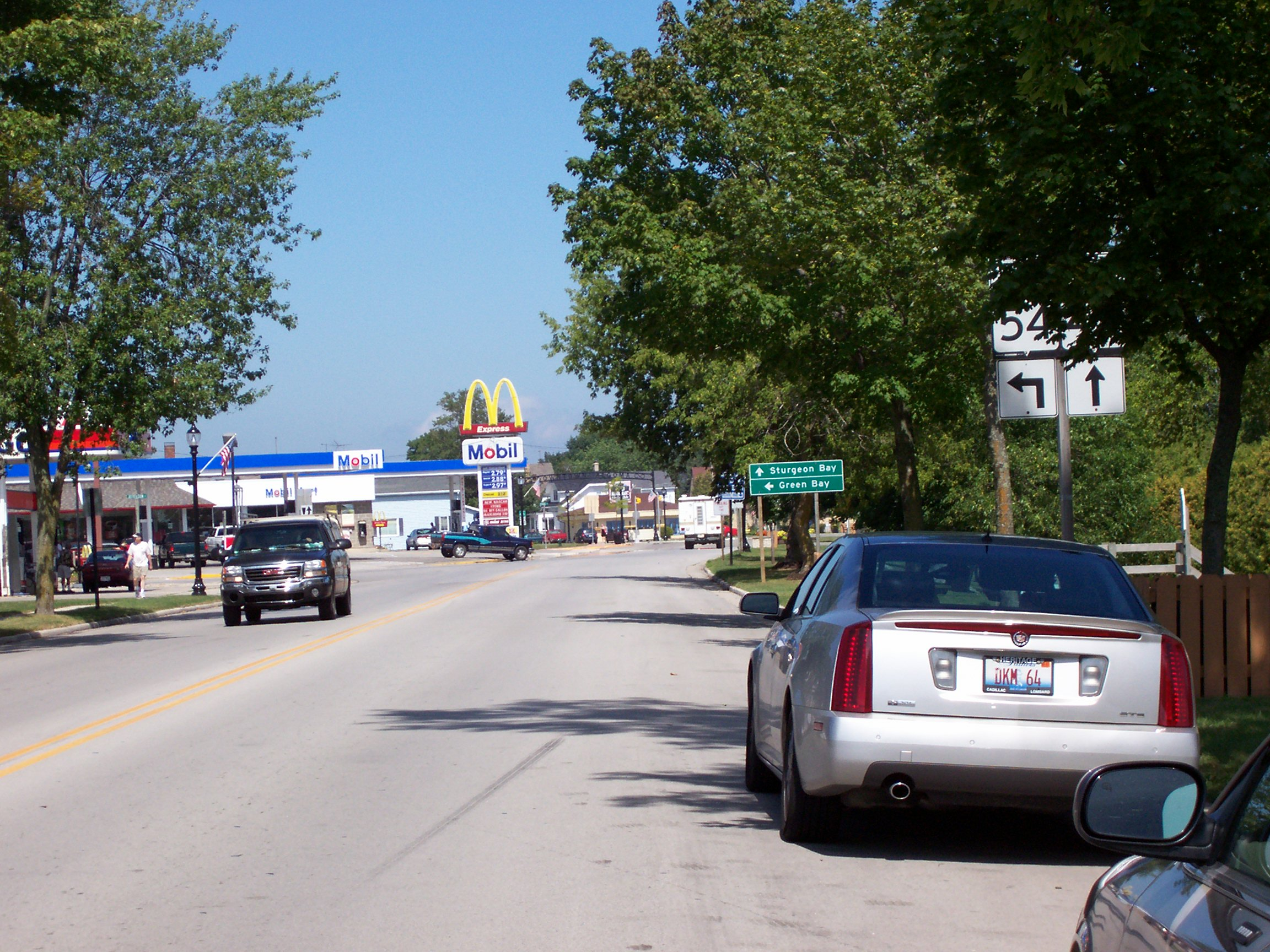
East terminus in Algoma

In downtown, WIS 29 then briefly joins the concurrency between Walnut Street and Main Street. At Main Street, US 141 intersects with three routes. This is where WIS 29 turns southeast. After crossing that intersection, they then turn southeast and then east. They then meet I-43 at a parclo. After meeting with I-43, the road becomes a freeway. In the middle of it, WIS 54 leaves the freeway. It continues to travel eastward through the Door Peninsula until reaching WIS 42 in downtown Algoma. At that point, WIS 54 ends there.

== History ==
Initially, WIS 54 ran from Green Bay to WIS 17 (now part of WIS 42) in Algona. In 1920, WIS 54 extended westward to WIS 22 in Royalton. In 1924, WIS 54 extended westward to the Mississippi River. This route largely followed its present-day routing. As a result of the extension, it replaced parts of WIS 66 from Wisconsin Rapids to Plover and WIS 52 from Decora Prairie to Black River Falls. By 1931, a portion of WIS 54 between Shiocton and Black Creek was straightened. By 1932, WIS 54 took a different approach to connect to Green Bay from the west. This time, it took Mason Street instead of WIS 29/WIS 32.

== Future ==
The Wisconsin Department of Transportation (WisDOT) plans to add roundabouts at two intersections along WIS 54 in Seymour. The roundabouts will be constructed at Main Street and Ivory Street. The highway through the city will also be reconfigured from a four-lane road to a three-lane road with a two-way left-turn lane. Construction will begin in early 2024 and is expected to end later in the year.

== Major intersections ==
County	Location	mi	km	Exit	Destinations	Notes
Mississippi River		0.0	0.0		MN 43 south	Continuation into Minnesota
Mississippi River		0.0	0.0	North Channel Bridge		
Buffalo	Town of Buffalo				WIS 35 north – Fountain City	Western end of WIS 35 concurrency
Trempealeau	Town of Trempealeau				WIS 35 south / WIS 93 north – Trempealeau, Arcadia	Eastern end of WIS 35 concurrency; western end of WIS 93 concurrency
Trempealeau	Galesville				US 53 north (Main Street) – Galesville	Western end of US 53 concurrency
Trempealeau	Town of Gale				US 53 south / WIS 93 south – La Crosse	Eastern end of US 53/WIS 93 concurrency
Jackson	Melrose				WIS 71 east / WIS 108 south – Sparta, West Salem	Western terminus of WIS 71; northern terminus of WIS 108
Jackson	Black River Falls				US 12 west (Water Street) / WIS 27 north – Merrillan	Western end of US 12/WIS 27 concurrency
Jackson	Black River Falls				US 12 east (Roosevelt Road) / WIS 27 south – Tomah, Sparta	Eastern end of US 12/WIS 27 concurrency
Jackson	Black River Falls				I-94 – Eau Claire, Madison	Exit 116 along I-94
Wood	Dexter				WIS 80 north – Pittsville	Western end of WIS 80 concurrency
Wood	Dexter				WIS 80 south – Necedah	Eastern end of WIS 80 concurrency
Wood	Port Edwards				WIS 73 south (Prospect Avenue)	Western end of WIS 73 concurrency
Wood	Wisconsin Rapids				WIS 13 (Riverview Expressway) / WIS 73 north	Eastern end of WIS 73 concurrency; western end of WIS 13 concurrency
Wood	Wisconsin Rapids				WIS 13 south (8th Street)	Eastern end of WIS 13 concurrency
Portage	Plover				Bus. US 51 (Post Road)	Western end of Bus. US 51 concurrency
Portage	Town of Plover				I-39 / US 51 – Wausau, Portage Bus. US 51	Southern terminus of Bus. US 51
Waupaca	Waupaca				US 10 west / WIS 22 / WIS 49 north – Waupaca, Stevens Point	Western end of US 10/WIS 49 concurrency
Waupaca	Waupaca			252	WIS 22 south / CTH-K south – Waupaca, Wild Rose	Western end of WIS 22 concurrency
Waupaca	Town of Waupaca			253	Churchill Street	
Waupaca	Waupaca				US 10 east / WIS 49 south	Eastern end of US 10/WIS 49 concurrency
Waupaca	Royalton				WIS 110 south – Weyauwega	Western end of WIS 110 concurrency
Waupaca	Royalton				WIS 22 north / WIS 110 north – Manawa, Clintonville	Eastern end of WIS 22/WIS 110 concurrency
Outagamie	New London				US 45 – Hortonville, Oshkosh, Clintonville, Marion	Interchange
Outagamie	Shiocton				WIS 76 north – Bear Creek	Western end of WIS 76 concurrency
Outagamie	Shiocton				WIS 76 south	Eastern end of WIS 76 concurrency
Outagamie	Shiocton				WIS 187 north – Leeman	Southern terminus of WIS 187
Outagamie	Black Creek				WIS 47 – Bonduel, Appleton	
Outagamie	City of Seymour				WIS 55 north – Shawano	Western end of WIS 55 concurrency
Outagamie	Town of Oneida				WIS 55 south – Freedom, Kaukauna	Eastern end of WIS 55 concurrency
Brown	Hobart				WIS 172 east / CTH-E south – Green Bay–Austin Straubel International Airport, Freedom	Roundabout; western terminus of WIS 172
Brown	Green Bay				I-41 / US 41 / WIS 32 north – Marinette, Appleton	Western end of WIS 32 concurrency
Brown	Green Bay			—	WIS 32 south (Ashland Avenue)	Eastern end of WIS 32 concurrency; western end of freeway
Brown	Green Bay			—	Broadway	Westbound exit and eastbound entrance
Brown	Green Bay			—	Madison Street – Downtown	Eastbound exit and westbound entrance
Brown	Green Bay			—	WIS 57 (Monroe Avenue)	Western end of WIS 57 concurrency
Brown	Green Bay				WIS 29 west (Walnut Street)	Western end of WIS 29 concurrency
Brown	Green Bay				US 141 (Main Street) / WIS 29 east	Eastern end of WIS 29 concurrency
Brown	Green Bay			—	I-43 / LMCT – Milwaukee	Western end of freeway
Brown	Green Bay			—	University Avenue; Nicolet Drive	
Brown	Green Bay			—	CTH-EA (Huron Road/Bay Settlement Road)	
Brown	Green Bay			—	WIS 57 north / LMCT	Western end of WIS 57 concurrency; WIS 57 freeway continues north
Kewaunee	Algoma				WIS 42 / LMCT – Sturgeon Bay, Kewaunee	Eastern terminus
1.000 mi = 1.609 km; 1.000 km = 0.621 mi: Concurrency terminus; Incomplete access

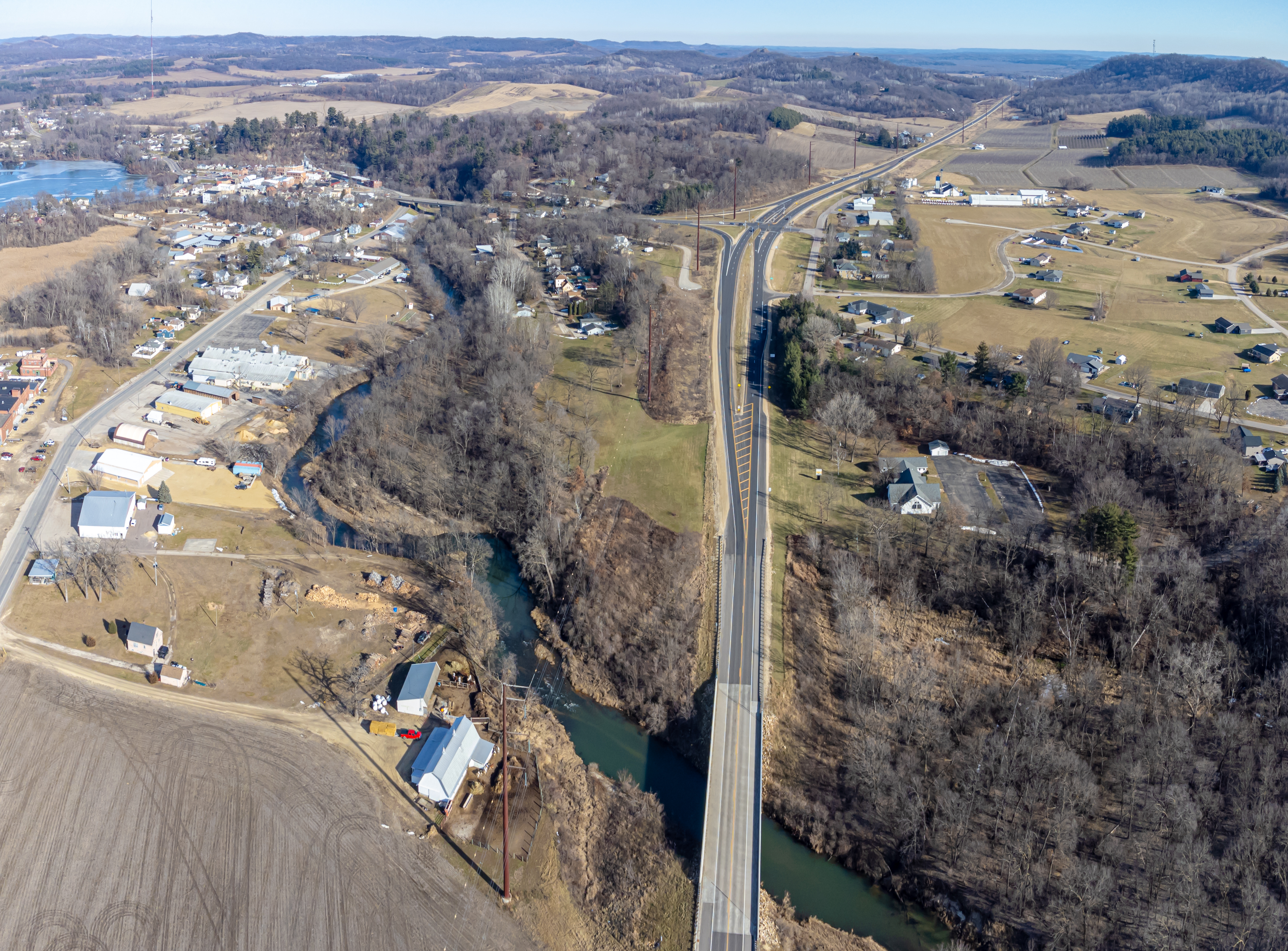
Wisconsin State Highway 54 & 93. US-53 splits off north through Galesville
