= North Leeds, Wisconsin =

- Unincorporated community
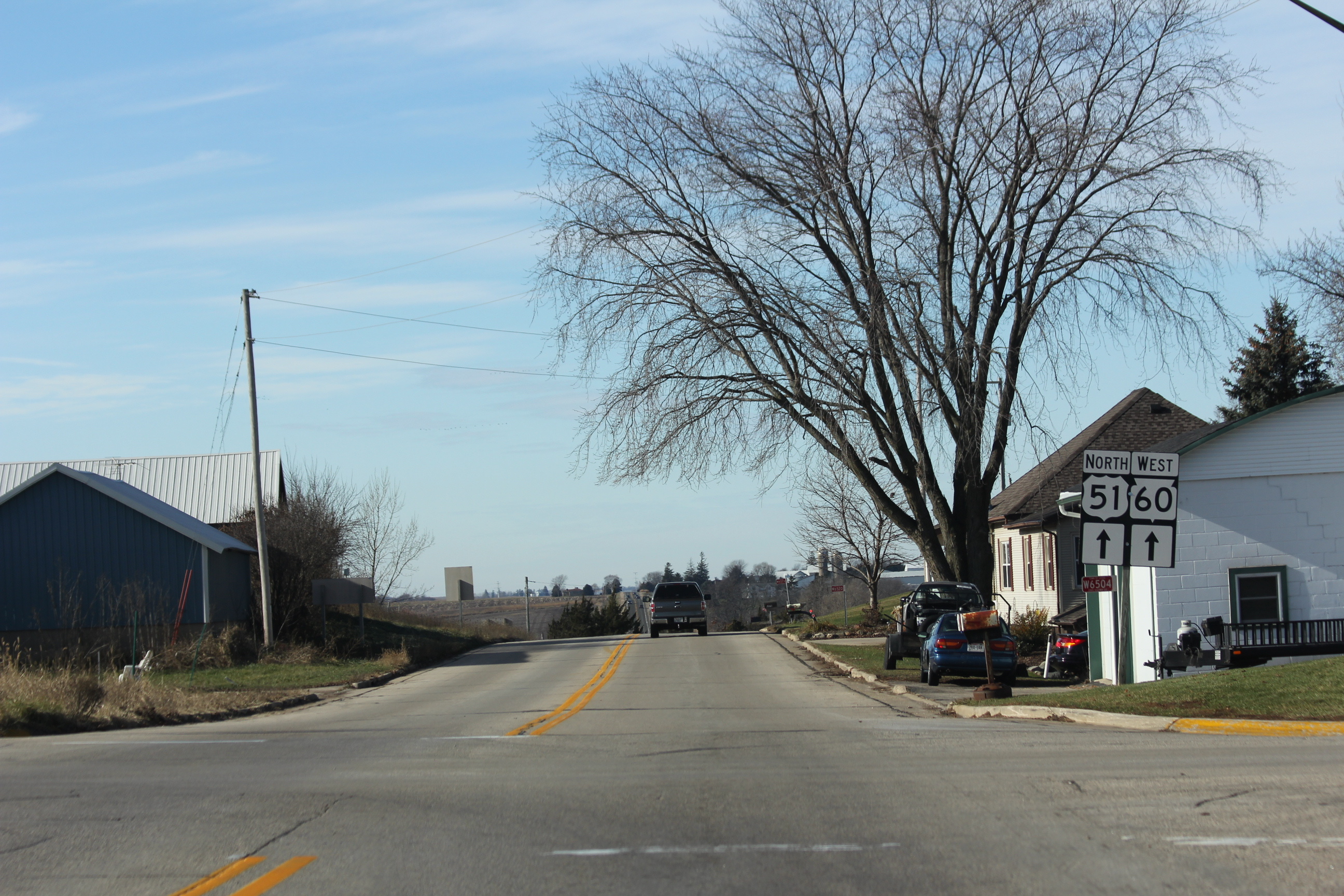
- Looking west in North Leeds on WIS 60 / U.S. 51

- Location within Wisconsin Location within the United States
- Coordinates: 43°19′55″N 89°19′31″W
- Country: United States
- State: Wisconsin
- County: Columbia
- Town: Leeds
- Elevation: 1,079 ft (329 m)
- Time zone: UTC-6 (Central (CST))
  - Summer (DST): UTC-5 (CDT)
- Area code: 608
- GNIS feature ID: 1570460

North Leeds is an unincorporated community located in the town of Leeds, Columbia County, Wisconsin, United States.

== Transportation ==
North Leeds is the major junction of Route 51, WIS 22, and WIS 60. US 51 runs south to DeForest and Madison. US 51 North has a short cosigning with WIS 60, which heads west to Arlington and Lodi, before 51 heads north toward Poynette and Portage. WIS 60 East heads to Columbus. This is where WIS 22 begins and heads north to Wyocena, Pardeeville, and Montello.

== Images ==
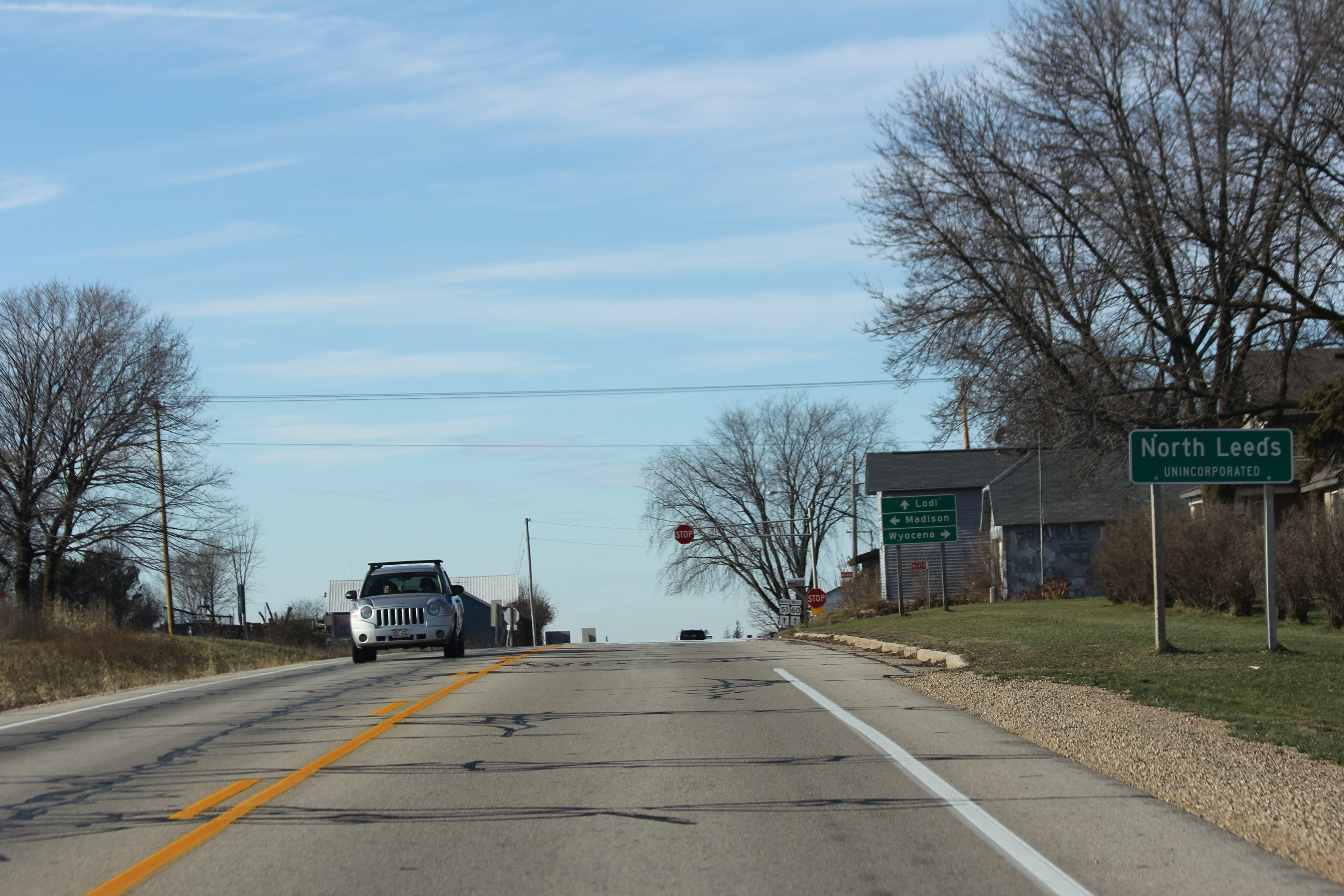
Looking west at the sign for North Leeds on WIS 60

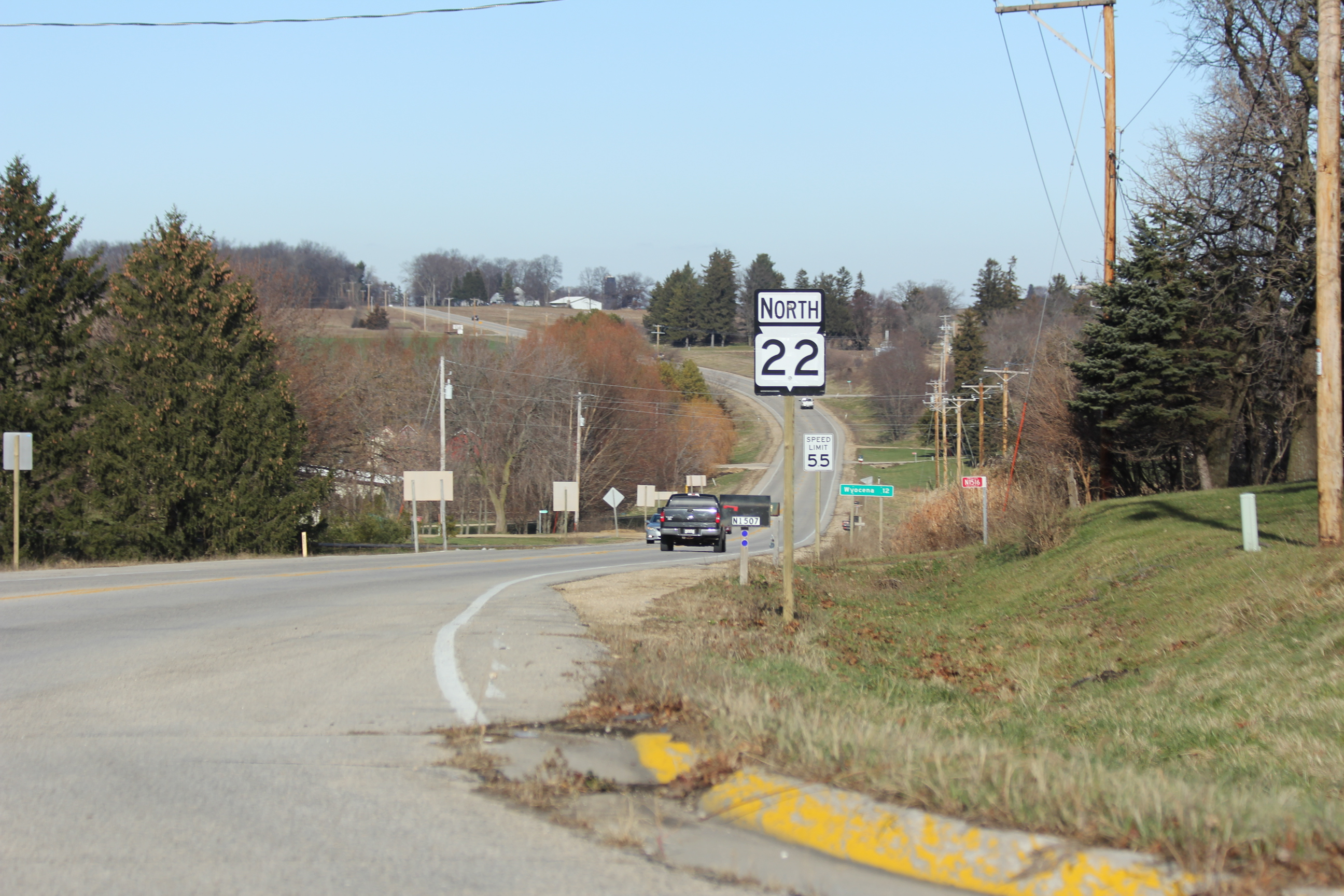
Looking north in North Leeds at WIS 22
