= Alvin A. Handrich =

American farmer, businessman, and politician

Alvin A. Handrich (June 1, 1892 – November 26, 1981) was an American farmer, businessman, and politician.

Born in the town of Bloomfield, Waushara County, Wisconsin, Handrich lived in California for five years (1912 - 1917) where he owned and operated a clothing store, a hotel, and a restaurant in Perris, and an automotive garage in San Bernardino. Handrich later lived on a farm in the town of Little Wolf, Wisconsin. He was district manager for Standard Oil Company until retiring in 1960 and lived in Manawa, Wisconsin. He was also secretary of the Wisconsin division of the Farm Holiday Association. Handrich served on the Little Wolf Town Board and on the Little Wolf School Board. From 1935 to 1939, Handrich served in the Wisconsin State Assembly and was elected on the Wisconsin Progressive Party ticket. Handrich served on the Manawa City Council until his death. Handrich died in a hospital in Waupaca, Wisconsin on November 26, 1981.
