= Emil H. Steiger =

American politician

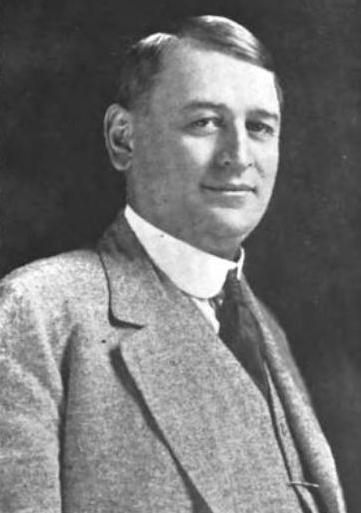

Member of the Wisconsin State Assembly
- In office 1899–1903

Personal details
- Born: Emil Herman Steiger; September 27, 1871 Fremont, Wisconsin
- Died: November 21, 1929 (aged 58) Oshkosh, Wisconsin
- Party: Republican
- Occupation: Businessman, politician

Emil Herman Steiger (September 27, 1871 – November 21, 1929) was an American businessman and politician.

== Biography ==
Emil H. Steiger was born in Fremont, Wisconsin on September 27, 1871. He went to the Oshkosh Business College in Oshkosh, Wisconsin. He worked for the Grass Twine Company and in logging. Steiger served on the Fremont Village Board and was involved with the Republican Party. He served in the Wisconsin State Assembly from 1899 to 1903. Steiger was president of the Deltox Grass Rug Company and Pure Ice Company in Oshkosh, Wisconsin.

He married Sophia Faust on June 19, 1895, and they had four children.

Steiger died suddenly of a heart attack in Oshkosh while eating dinner.
