= Boyd A. Clark =

American judge

Boyd A. Clark (January 20, 1918 – March 6, 1978) was an American jurist and politician.

Born in Wild Rose, Wisconsin, Clark graduated from Sparta High School. He served in the United States Army Air Forces during World War II and was a cryptographer and an educational and vocational counselor.

Clark received his bachelor's degree from University of Wisconsin–Madison and his law degree from University of Wisconsin Law School. He then practiced law in Wild Rose and Wautoma, Wisconsin. In 1947, Clark served in the Wisconsin State Assembly and was a Republican. From 1949 to 1956, he served as district attorney of Waushara County, Wisconsin. Then, from 1956 to his death, in 1978, Clark served as county judge of Waushara County, Wisconsin.

In 1977, Clark was accused of drunken driving, but he died of a stroke in Wild Rose, Wisconsin in 1978 before he could go to court.
