= Otto L. Olen =

American politician

Otto L. Olen was a member of the Wisconsin State Assembly. He was born in 1867 and died in 1946.

== Biography ==
Olen was born in Winneconne, Wisconsin, in 1875. Professions he held include schoolteacher before opening a law practice in Manawa, Wisconsin. In 1911, he moved to Clintonville, Wisconsin.

== Political career ==
Olen was elected to the Assembly in 1906 and 1910. Additionally, he was vice-chairman of the county board of Waupaca County, Wisconsin. He was a Republican.
