= Wisconsin Highway 44 =

State highway in Wisconsin, United States

State Trunk Highway 44
- WIS 44 highlighted in red

Route information
- Maintained by WisDOT
- Length: 63.86 mi (102.77 km)

Major junctions
- South end: WIS 22 in Pardeeville
- I-41 / US 41 / WIS 91 in Oshkosh
- North end: US 45 in Oshkosh

Location
- Country: United States
- State: Wisconsin
- Counties: Columbia, Green Lake, Fond du Lac, Winnebago

Highway system
- Wisconsin State Trunk Highway System; Interstate; US; State; Scenic; Rustic
← WIS 43	→ US 45

State Trunk Highway 44 (often called Highway 44, STH-44 or WIS 44) is a state highway in the U.S. state of Wisconsin. It runs in a diagonal southwest–northeast direction in east-central Wisconsin from Pardeeville to Oshkosh.

== Route description ==
WIS 44 begins in Pardeeville, in Columbia County at the junction with WIS 22. It heads northeast out of town. It has a brief cosigning with WIS 33 for a mile before continuing to head northeast. WIS 33's control cities at this point are Portage to the west and Fox Lake to the east. WIS 44 crosses into Green Lake County at Hwy HH, just south of Dalton. WIS 44 continues northeast to Kingston.

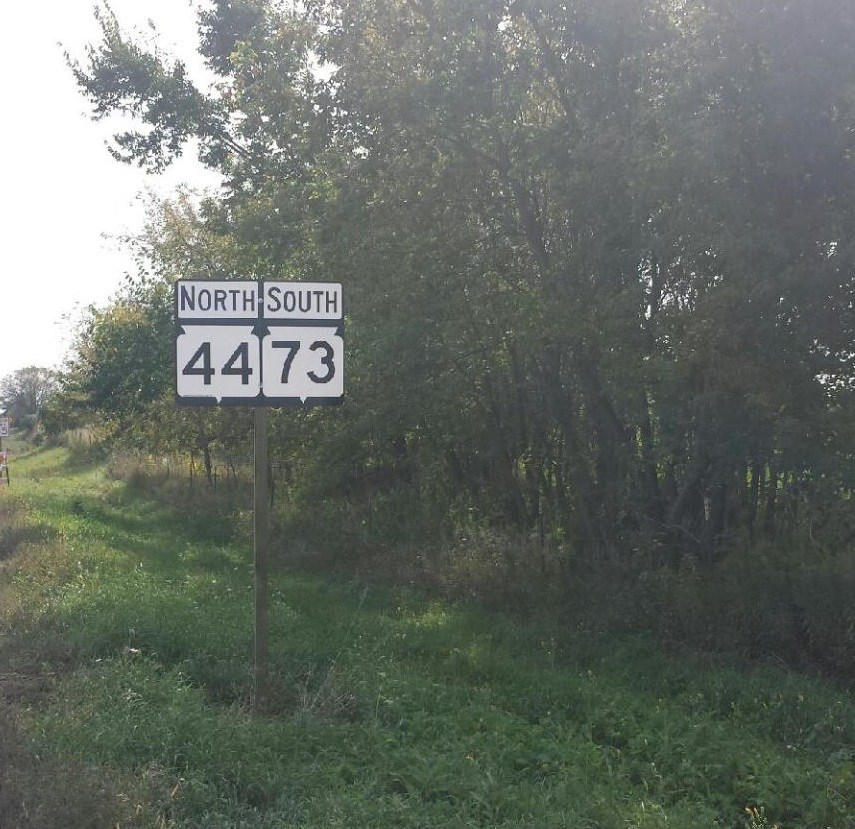
A wrong-way concurrency of WIS 44 and WIS 73, just west of Manchester traveling east

About four miles (6.4 km) east of Kingston, WIS 44 meets up with WIS 73. WIS 73 north heads to Princeton. It is cosigned with WIS 73, forming a wrong-way concurrency for roughly 1 1/2 miles (2.4 km) through the unincorporated town of Manchester before WIS 73 cuts south to head to Randolph and Columbus. About 1 1/2 miles (2.4 km) after the WIS 73 split, WIS 44 enters the city of Markesan. After passing Little Green Lake just north of Markesan, WIS 44 heads east, crosses into Fond du Lac County at Searle Road, then enters the town of Fairwater. After another two miles (3.2 km), WIS 44 meets up with WIS 49. WIS 49 south heads to Brandon and Waupun. WIS 44 and WIS 49 are cosigned for about seven miles (11 km) as they enter the city of Ripon. At the junction with WIS 23, WIS 49 north cosigns with WIS 23 west to head to Green Lake and Berlin. Meanwhile, WIS 44 has a brief cosign with WIS 23 east, which heads to Rosendale and Fond du Lac, before it cuts north along Douglas Street on Ripon's east side. WIS 44, as it leaves the city limits, heads northeast. Just shy of the unincorporated town of Pickett, WIS 44 crosses into Winnebago County. WIS 44 continues roughly another 10 miles (16 km) heading northeast to Oshkosh.

As WIS 44 enters the Oshkosh city limits on Ripon Road, it meets up with WIS 91, which heads west to Waukau and Berlin. It has a brief one-mile (1.6 km) cosign with it until the junction with Interstate 41 where WIS 91 ends. WIS 44 follows South Park Avenue from I-41 to Ohio Street. WIS 44 then turns north along Ohio to cross the Fox River. At the Fox River, the road becomes Wisconsin Street. WIS 44 then turns east on Irving Avenue to meet US 45, Jackson Street, where it ends.

== History ==
Initially, WIS 44 traveled from Dalton to Princeton via part of its present-day routing and present-day WIS 73. The route southwest of Dalton was not opened yet. In 1919, the route extended southwest to Portage. In 1920, WIS 33 superseded the westernmost portion of WIS 44 from Portage to Marcellon. In 1924, both of WIS 44's termini were extended. The route extended south to WIS 10 (now US 51) in North Leeds via part of present-day WIS 44 and WIS 22. On the other hand, the route no longer served Princeton. Instead, it served Oshkosh via much of its present-day routing. In 1947, WIS 22 superseded the southernmost portion of WIS 44 from Pardeeville to North Leeds.

== Major intersections ==
County	Location	mi	km	Destinations	Notes
Columbia	Pardeeville	0.0	0.0	WIS 22 (Main Street)	Southern terminus of WIS 44
Columbia	Marcellon	3.2	5.1	WIS 33 west – Portage	Western end of WIS 33 concurrency
Columbia	Marcellon	4.2	6.8	WIS 33 east – Fox Lake	Eastern end of WIS 33 concurrency
Green Lake	Manchester	20.7	33.3	WIS 73 north – Princeton	Northern end of WIS 73 concurrency
Green Lake	Manchester	22.1	35.6	WIS 73 south – Randolph	Southern end of WIS 73 concurrency
Fond du Lac	Town of Metomen	35.5	57.1	WIS 49 south – Brandon	Southern end of WIS 49 concurrency
Fond du Lac	Ripon	43.0	69.2	WIS 23 west / WIS 49 north (Fond du Lac Street)	Northern end of WIS 49 concurrency; western end of WIS 23 concurrency
Fond du Lac	Ripon	43.9	70.7	WIS 23 east (Fond du Lac Street)	Eastern end of WIS 23 concurrency
Winnebago	Oshkosh	59.7	96.1	WIS 91 west – Waukau, Berlin	Western end of WIS 91 concurrency
Winnebago	Oshkosh	60.5	97.4	I-41 / US 41 – Green Bay, Milwaukee WIS 91 west	Eastern end of WIS 91 concurrency
Winnebago	Oshkosh	63.86	102.77	US 45 (Jackson Street)	Northern terminus of WIS 44
1.000 mi = 1.609 km; 1.000 km = 0.621 mi: Concurrency terminus
