= Big Falls, Waupaca County, Wisconsin =

Big Falls
- Village
- Location of Big Falls in Waupaca County, Wisconsin.

- Location within the state of Wisconsin
- Coordinates: 44°37′11″N 89°1′5″W
- Country: United States
- State: Wisconsin
- County: Waupaca

Area
  - Total: 0.50 sq mi (1.30 km^{2})
  - Land: 0.47 sq mi (1.23 km^{2})
  - Water: 0.027 sq mi (0.07 km^{2})

Population (2020)
  - Total: 60
  - Density: 130/sq mi (49/km^{2})
- Time zone: UTC-6 (Central (CST))
  - Summer (DST): UTC-5 (CDT)
- FIPS code: 55-07250
- GNIS feature ID: 1582808
- Website: https://www.villageofbigfallswi.com/

Big Falls is a village in Waupaca County, Wisconsin, United States. The population was 60 at the 2020 census.

== History ==
The village was founded in 1882 as a lumbering town, and was named for the Little Wolf River falls.

== Geography ==
Big Falls is located at 44°37′11″N 89°1′5″W (44.619740, -89.017920).

According to the United States Census Bureau, the village has a total area of 0.51 square miles (1.32 km^{2}), of which 0.48 square miles (1.24 km^{2}) is land and 0.03 square miles (0.08 km^{2}) is water.

== Demographics ==
Historical population
| Census | Pop. | Note | %± |
|---|---|---|---|
| 1930 | 178 | | — |
| 1940 | 187 | | 5.1% |
| 1950 | 146 | | −21.9% |
| 1960 | 119 | | −18.5% |
| 1970 | 112 | | −5.9% |
| 1980 | 107 | | −4.5% |
| 1990 | 75 | | −29.9% |
| 2000 | 85 | | 13.3% |
| 2010 | 61 | | −28.2% |
| 2020 | 60 | | −1.6% |
U.S. Decennial Census

=== 2010 census ===
As of the census of 2010, there were 61 people, 35 households, and 16 families living in the village. The population density was 127.1 inhabitants per square mile (49.1/km^{2}). There were 54 housing units at an average density of 112.5 per square mile (43.4/km^{2}). The racial makeup of the village was 100.0% White. Hispanic or Latino of any race were 1.6% of the population.

There were 35 households, of which 5.7% had children under the age of 18 living with them, 37.1% were married couples living together, 8.6% had a male householder with no wife present, and 54.3% were non-families. 51.4% of all households were made up of individuals, and 14.3% had someone living alone who was 65 years of age or older. The average household size was 1.74 and the average family size was 2.50.

The median age in the village was 57.1 years. 6.6% of residents were under the age of 18; 1.5% were between the ages of 18 and 24; 13.1% were from 25 to 44; 44.3% were from 45 to 64; and 34.4% were 65 years of age or older. The gender makeup of the village was 62.3% male and 37.7% female.

=== 2000 census ===
As of the census of 2000, there were 85 people, 40 households, and 24 families living in the village. The population density was 175.6 people per square mile (68.4/km^{2}). There were 54 housing units at an average density of 111.6/sq mi (43.4/km^{2}). The racial makeup of the village was 98.82% White, and 1.18% from two or more races.

There were 40 households, out of which 30.0% had children under the age of 18 living with them, 42.5% were married couples living together, 5.0% had a female householder with no husband present, and 40.0% were non-families. 40.0% of all households were made up of individuals, and 12.5% had someone living alone who was 65 years of age or older. The average household size was 2.13 and the average family size was 2.88.

In the village, the population was spread out, with 25.9% under the age of 18, 2.4% from 18 to 24, 28.2% from 25 to 44, 25.9% from 45 to 64, and 17.6% who were 65 years of age or older. The median age was 43 years. For every 100 females, there were 117.9 males. For every 100 females age 18 and over, there were 125.0 males.

The median income for a household in the village was $31,806, and the median income for a family was $41,250. Males had a median income of $30,000 versus $23,750 for females. The per capita income for the village was $16,510. There were 13.8% of families and 8.7% of the population living below the poverty line, including 6.1% of under eighteens and none of those over 64.
