= Little Wolf River =

River in Wisconsin, United States

Coordinates: 44°22′54″N 88°48′00″W

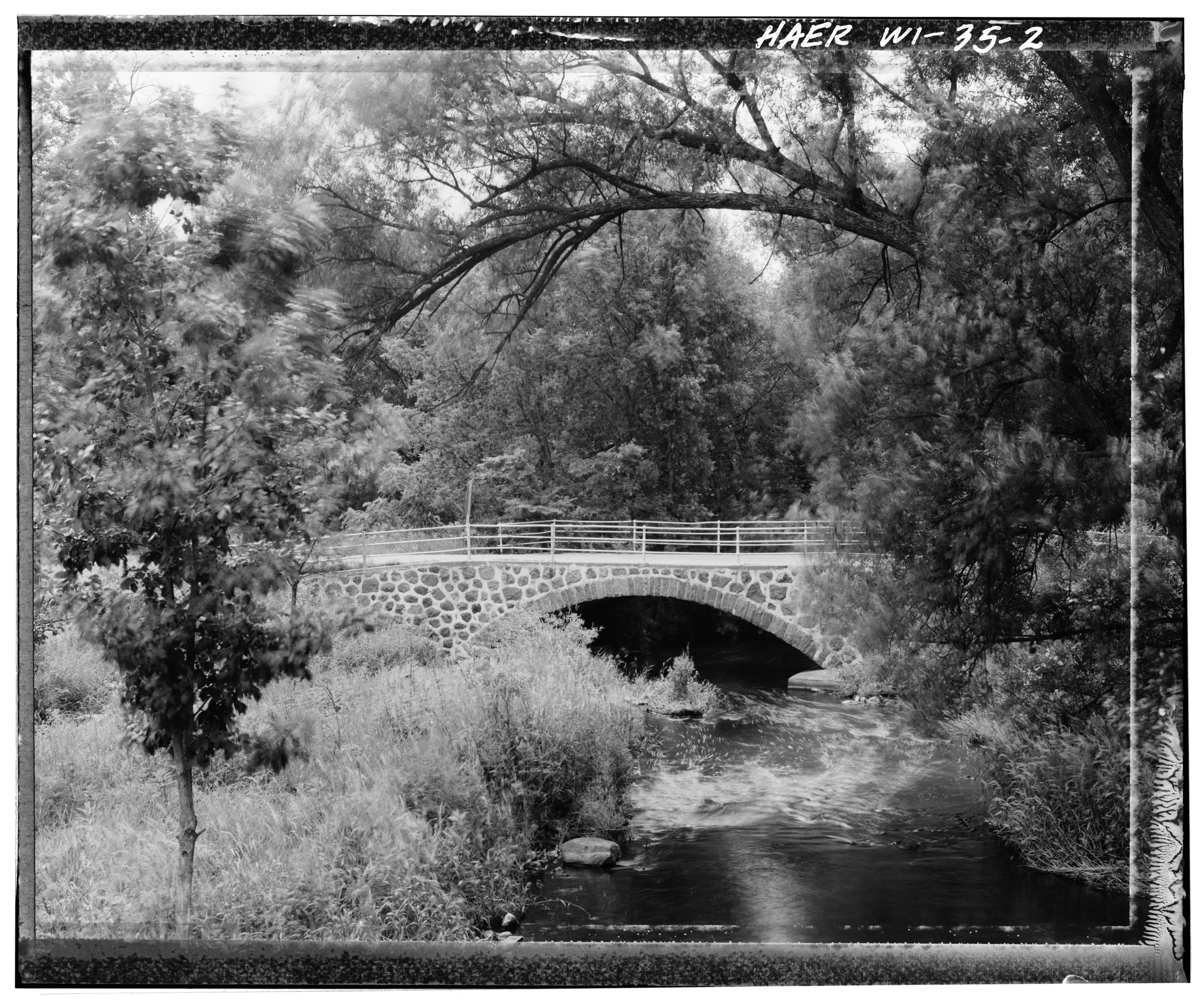
Little Wolf River at Mill Street Bridge in 1933

The Little Wolf River of Wisconsin is a tributary of the Wolf River, which ultimately flows toward Green Bay, part of Lake Michigan.

The Little Wolf River originates near Galloway in southeast Marathon County and flows into Waupaca County through Big Falls and Manawa and has a dam. Below Manawa the Little Wolf River passes by Royalton then converges into the Wolf River in eastern Waupaca County.

On July 5, 2024, the Little Wolf River flooded, putting the structural integrity of the Manawa Dam at risk. The river overtopped the dam, causing the city of Manawa to be flooded and evacuated.
