= Fremont, Waupaca County, Wisconsin =

Town in Wisconsin, United States

Fremont, Wisconsin
- Town
- Town of Fremont
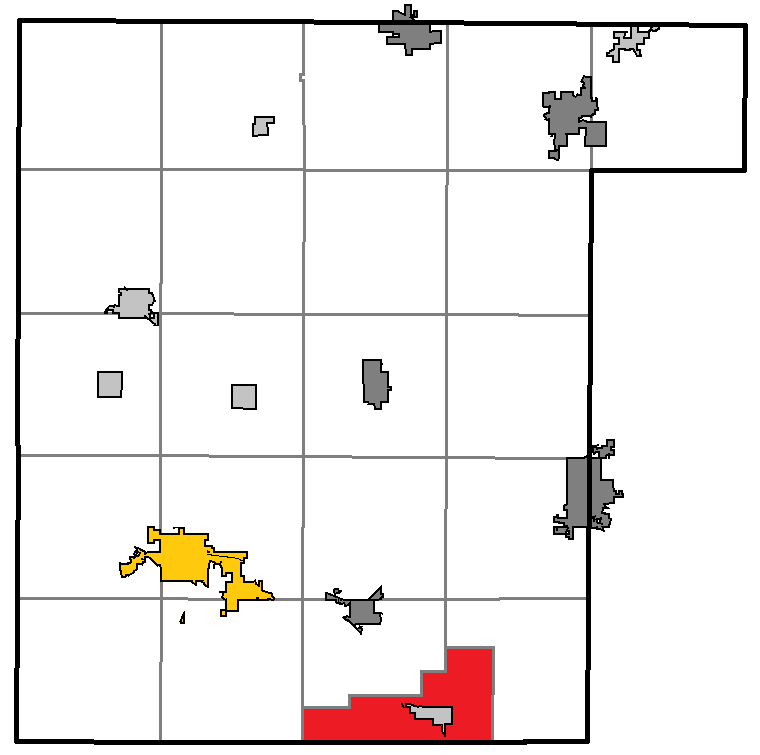
- Location of Fremont, within Waupaca County
- Coordinates: 44°15′25.54″N 88°54′2.37″W
- Country: United States
- State: Wisconsin
- County: Waupaca

Area
  - Total: 19.04 sq mi (49.3 km^{2})
  - Land: 17.93 sq mi (46.4 km^{2})
  - Water: 1.12 sq mi (2.9 km^{2})

Population (2020)
  - Total: 627
  - Density: 35.0/sq mi (13.5/km^{2})
- Time zone: UTC-6 (Central (CST))
  - Summer (DST): UTC-5 (CDT)
- Area code(s): 920 & 274
- GNIS feature ID: 1583247

Fremont is a town in Waupaca County, Wisconsin, United States. The population was 627 at the 2020 census. The village of Fremont is located within the town. The unincorporated community of Red Banks is located in the town.

== Geography ==
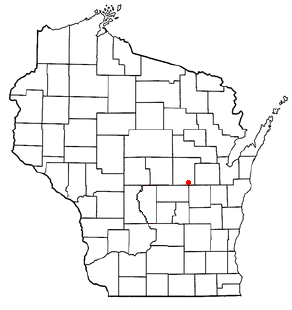
Location of Fremont, Waupaca County, Wisconsin

According to the United States Census Bureau, the town has a total area of 20.1 square miles (52.0 km^{2}), of which 19.1 square miles (49.4 km^{2}) is land and 1.0 square mile (2.6 km^{2}) (4.94%) is water.

== Demographics ==
At the 2000 United States census there were 632 people, 238 households, and 182 families in the town. The population density was 33.1 inhabitants per square mile (12.8/km^{2}). There were 278 housing units at an average density of 14.6 per square mile (5.6/km^{2}). The racial makeup of the town was 99.84% White and 0.16% Native American. Hispanic or Latino of any race were 0.32%.

Of the 238 households 27.7% had children under the age of 18 living with them, 69.3% were married couples living together, 2.9% had a female householder with no husband present, and 23.5% were non-families. 17.2% of households were one person and 9.2% were one person aged 65 or older. The average household size was 2.66 and the average family size was 3.01.

The age distribution was 24.2% under the age of 18, 7.6% from 18 to 24, 26.1% from 25 to 44, 26.1% from 45 to 64, and 16.0% 65 or older. The median age was 41 years. For every 100 females, there were 103.2 males. For every 100 females age 18 and over, there were 106.5 males.

The median household income was $43,472 and the median family income was $49,000. Males had a median income of $40,139 versus $25,000 for females. The per capita income for the town was $20,028. About 2.3% of families and 6.0% of the population were below the poverty line, including 5.2% of those under age 18 and 6.7% of those age 65 or over.
