= Manawa, Wisconsin =

- City
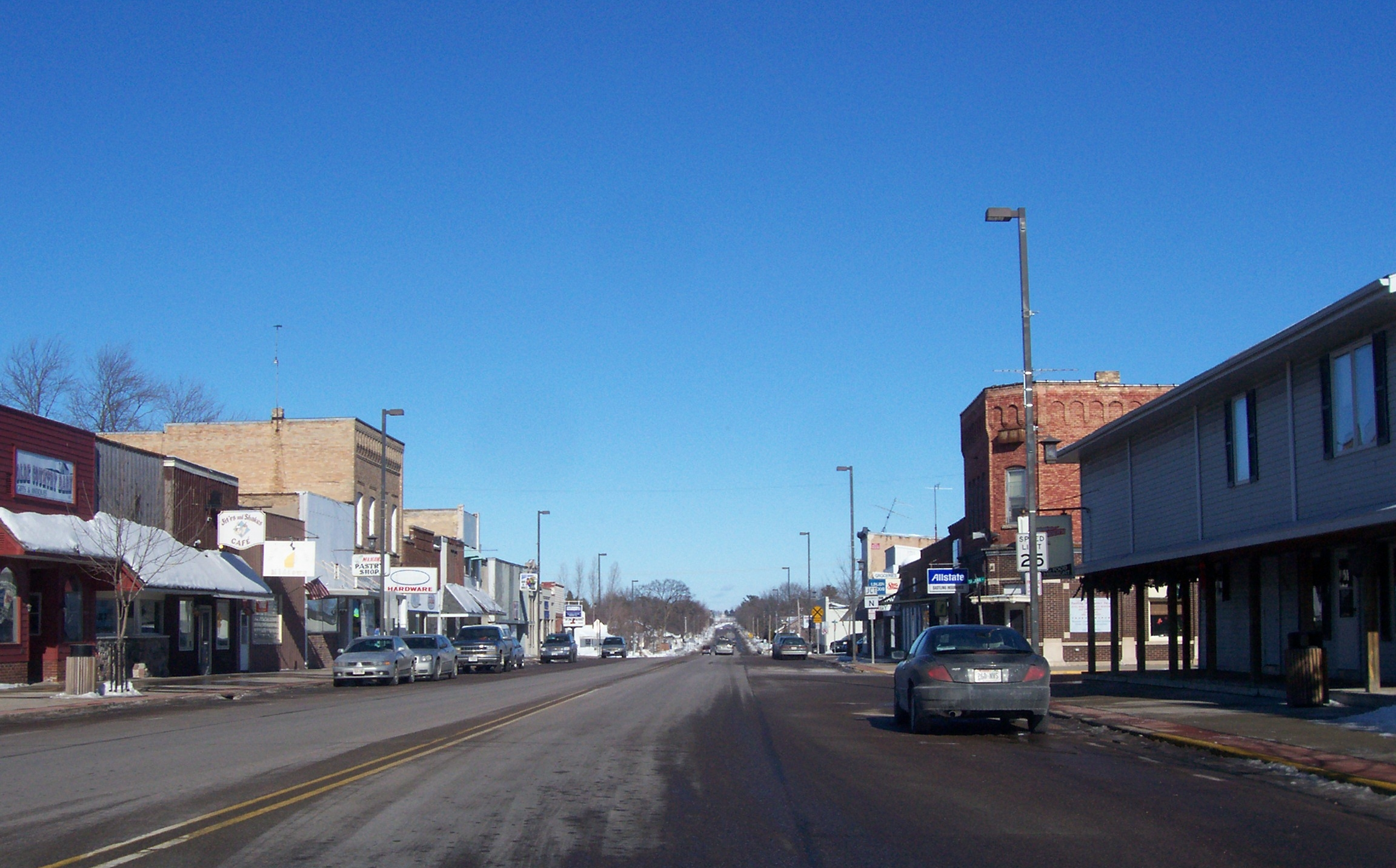
- Downtown Manawa

- Location of Manawa in Waupaca County, Wisconsin.

- Location within Wisconsin Location within the United States
- Coordinates: 44°27′38″N 88°55′9″W
- Country: United States
- State: Wisconsin
- County: Waupaca

Government
  - Mayor: Mike Frazier

Area
  - Total: 1.77 sq mi (4.58 km^{2})
  - Land: 1.63 sq mi (4.22 km^{2})
  - Water: 0.14 sq mi (0.36 km^{2})
- Elevation: 817 ft (249 m)

Population (2020)
  - Total: 1,441
  - Density: 884/sq mi (341/km^{2})
- Time zone: UTC-6 (Central (CST))
  - Summer (DST): UTC-5 (CDT)
- Postal code: 54949
- Area code: 920
- FIPS code: 55-48350
- GNIS feature ID: 1568931
- Website: cityofmanawa.org

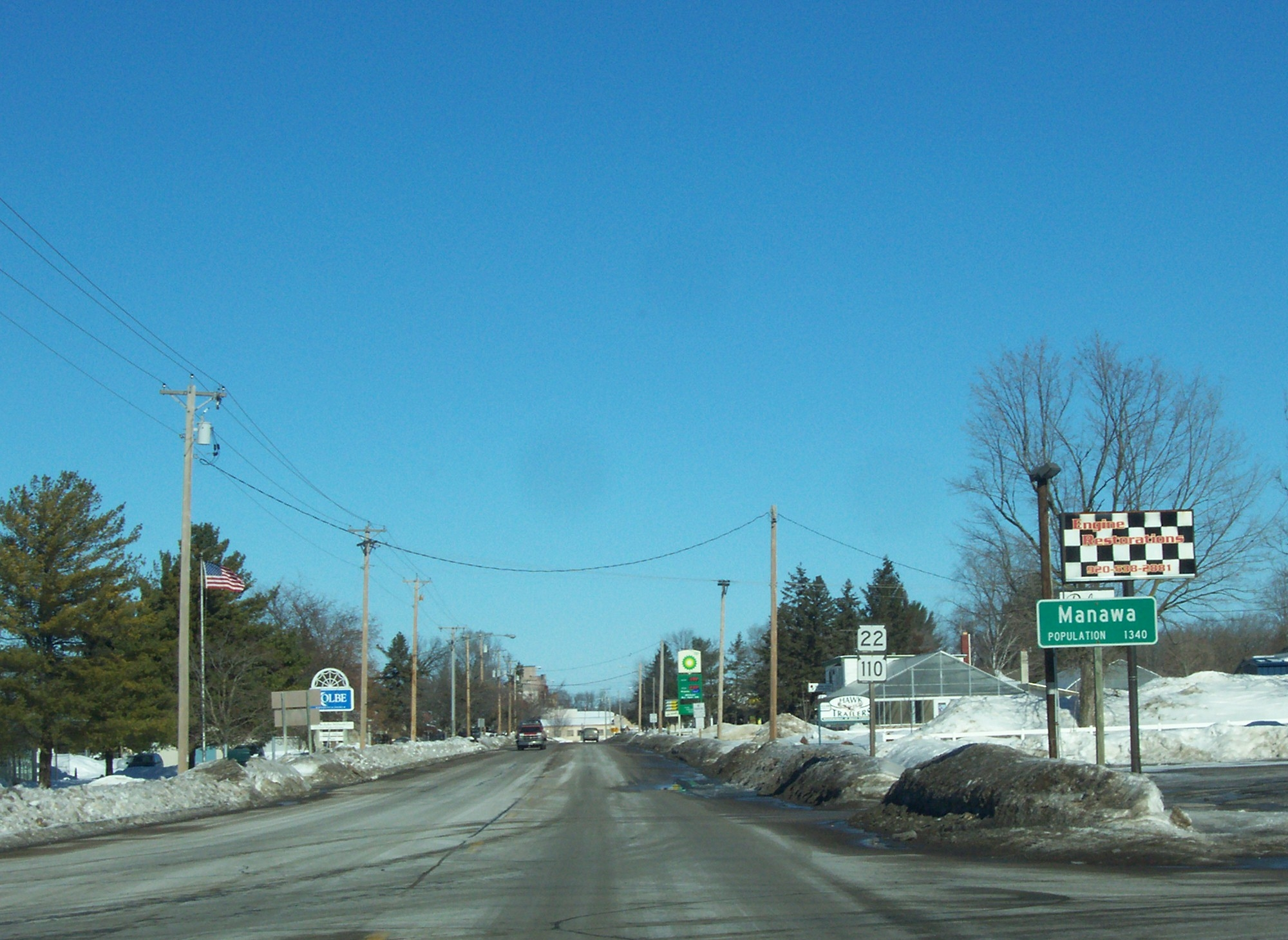
Looking north at Manawa

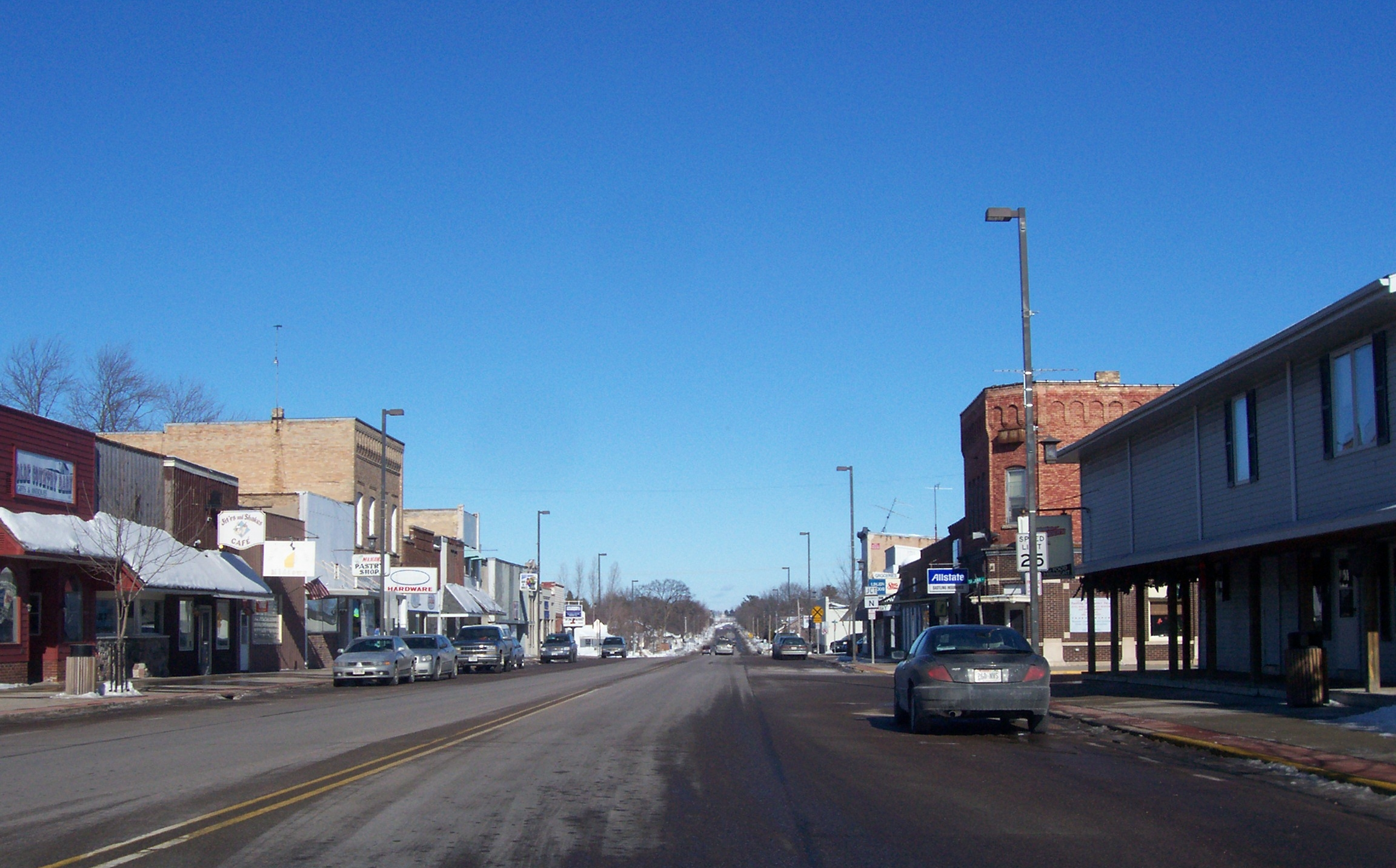
Looking north at downtown Manawa on WIS22 and WIS 110, this is located on Bridge Street also known as Main Street.

Manawa is a city in Waupaca County, Wisconsin, United States. The population was 1,441 at the 2020 census.

== History ==
On July 5, 2024, the Little Wolf River flooded, forcing evacuations in Manawa and compromising the structural integrity of the Manawa Dam on the Little Wolf River. This also caused the cancellation of the Midwestern Rodeo.

== Geography ==
According to the United States Census Bureau, the city has a total area of 1.77 square miles (4.58 km^{2}), of which 1.63 square miles (4.22 km^{2}) is land and 0.14 square miles (0.36 km^{2}) is water. It is located along the Little Wolf River, which flows towards Lake Michigan.

== Demographics ==
Historical population
Census	Pop.	Note	%±
1880	364		—
1890	350		−3.8%
1900	744		112.6%
1910	820		10.2%
1920	727		−11.3%
1930	711		−2.2%
1940	791		11.3%
1950	990		25.2%
1960	1,037		4.7%
1970	1,105		6.6%
1980	1,205		9.0%
1990	1,169		−3.0%
2000	1,330		13.8%
2010	1,371		3.1%
2020	1,441		5.1%
U.S. Decennial Census

=== 2020 census ===
As of the census of 2020, there were 1,441 people living in the city.

=== 2010 census ===
As of the census of 2010, there were 1,371 people, 584 households, and 343 families living in the city. The population density was 841.1 inhabitants per square mile (324.8/km^{2}). There were 668 housing units at an average density of 409.8 units per square mile (158.2 units/km^{2}). The racial makeup of the city was 97.1% White, 0.2% African American, 0.5% Native American, 0.4% Asian, 1.0% from other races, and 0.8% from two or more races. Hispanic or Latino of any race were 2.0% of the population.

There were 584 households, of which 30.1% had children under the age of 18 living with them, 41.4% were married couples living together, 12.7% had a female householder with no husband present, 4.6% had a male householder with no wife present, and 41.3% were non-families. 36.5% of all households were made up of individuals, and 15% had someone living alone who was 65 years of age or older. The average household size was 2.28 and the average family size was 2.97.

The median age in the city was 36.5 years. 24.7% of residents were under the age of 18; 8.5% were between the ages of 18 and 24; 26.5% were from 25 to 44; 24% were from 45 to 64; and 16.1% were 65 years of age or older. The gender makeup of the city was 49.5% male and 50.5% female.

=== 2000 census ===
As of the census of 2000, there were 1,330 people, 530 households, and 324 families living in the city. The population density was 796.7 people per square mile (307.6 people/km^{2}). There were 570 housing units at an average density of 341.4 units per square mile (131.8 units/km^{2}). The racial makeup of the city was 99.10% White, 0.08% African American, 0.38% Native American, 0.08% Asian, and 0.38% from two or more races. Hispanic or Latino of any race were 1.35% of the population.

There were 530 households, out of which 30.9% had children under the age of 18 living with them, 50.2% were married couples living together, 7.0% had a female householder with no husband present, and 38.7% were non-families. 34.2% of all households were made up of individuals, and 19.6% had someone living alone who was 65 years of age or older. The average household size was 2.41 and the average family size was 3.16.

In the city, the population was spread out, with 27.4% under the age of 18, 6.5% from 18 to 24, 27.6% from 25 to 44, 17.2% from 45 to 64, and 21.4% who were 65 years of age or older. The median age was 37 years. For every 100 females, there were 91.1 males. For every 100 females age 18 and over, there were 89.0 males.

The median income for a household in the city was $34,500, and the median income for a family was $52,656. Males had a median income of $34,886 versus $22,969 for females. The per capita income for the city was $16,886. About 5.6% of families and 9.8% of the population were below the poverty line, including 12.8% of those under age 18 and 12.6% of those age 65 or over.

== Education ==
The School District of Manawa, which serves the city of Manawa, at one time operated only rural schools. The district had one rural school for kindergarten in Symco. It was reorganized on October 25, 1982. It now consists of an elementary (3k - Grade 5) school and Little Wolf Junior-Senior High School (Grades 6–12.)

A school built on Depot Street in 1920 was added to and remodeled six times. In 1969, following a fire that destroyed part of that school, the Little Wolf High School was built. The school's mascot is a wolf.

Sports available in the schools include cross country, football, basketball, wrestling, volleyball, softball, baseball, track and field, bowling, and golf. Cheerleading is also available, but only for children in third through sixth grade. The pee-wee junior (black & black A), pee-wee (white), and Pop Warner (red) football team (3rd - 6th grade) is called the Manawa Cowboys, while the 7th through 12th grade football team is the Manawa "The Big Bad" Wolves (black and red). The school colors are red, black, and white.

Extracurricular activities available in the schools include Drama Club, Student Council, Art Team, Art Club, Quiz Bowl, Forensics, NHS, Marching Band, FFA and FOR Club

There is also a parochial school, St. Paul Lutheran School and Church, which serves preschool through 8th grade. Connected to St. Paul's is a day care center, Little Lambs Child Care.

== Events ==
Manawa hosts an annual Midwestern Rodeo in July, which consists of a rodeo, Independence Day parade, and four rodeo performances.

== Notable people ==
- Ed Bruyette, outfielder in Major League Baseball
- Alvin A. Handrich, Wisconsin State Representative
- Melvin O. Handrich, Medal of Honor recipient
- Joseph H. Hardgrove, Wisconsin State Representative
- Joseph McCarthy, U.S. Senator, graduated from Little Wolf High School in Manawa.
- Reid F. Murray, U.S. Representative, attended Manawa High School.
- Otto L. Olen, Wisconsin State Representative
