= Symco, Wisconsin =

- Unincorporated community
- Location within Wisconsin Location within the United States
- Coordinates: 44°30′48″N 88°54′14″W
- Country: United States
- State: Wisconsin
- County: Waupaca
- Elevation: 830 ft (250 m)
- Time zone: UTC-6 (Central (CST))
  - Summer (DST): UTC-5 (CDT)
- Area code: 920
- GNIS feature ID: 1575208

Symco is an unincorporated community located in the town of Union, Waupaca County, Wisconsin, United States. Symco is located on Wisconsin Highway 22 at the Little Wolf River, 3.5 miles (5.6 km) north-northeast of Manawa.

Symco has a car show called Symco Weekender, held annually during the second weekend of August.

== Notable people ==
- John Scanlon, Irish-born farmer and Greenback Party state legislator
