= Fremont, Wisconsin =

Fremont
- Village
- Location of Fremont in Waupaca County, Wisconsin.

- Location within the state of Wisconsin
- Coordinates: 44°15′43″N 88°52′12″W
- Country: United States
- State: Wisconsin
- County: Waupaca

Area
  - Total: 1.17 sq mi (3.02 km^{2})
  - Land: 1.03 sq mi (2.68 km^{2})
  - Water: 0.13 sq mi (0.34 km^{2})

Population (2020)
  - Total: 689
  - Density: 666/sq mi (257/km^{2})
- Time zone: UTC-6 (Central (CST))
  - Summer (DST): UTC-5 (CDT)
- Area code: 920
- FIPS code: 5527800
- Website: Village of Fremont

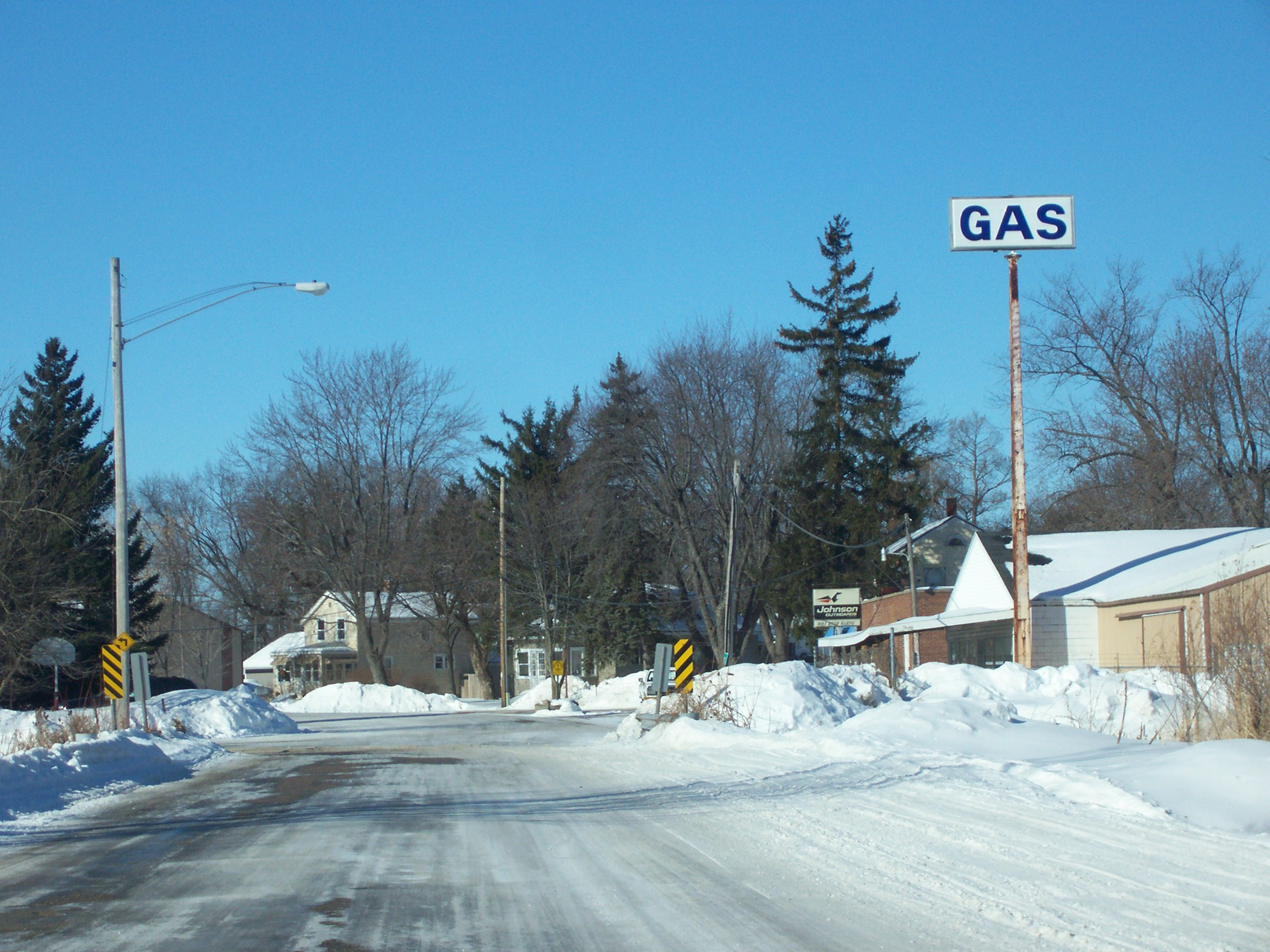
Fremont, east of the Wolf River

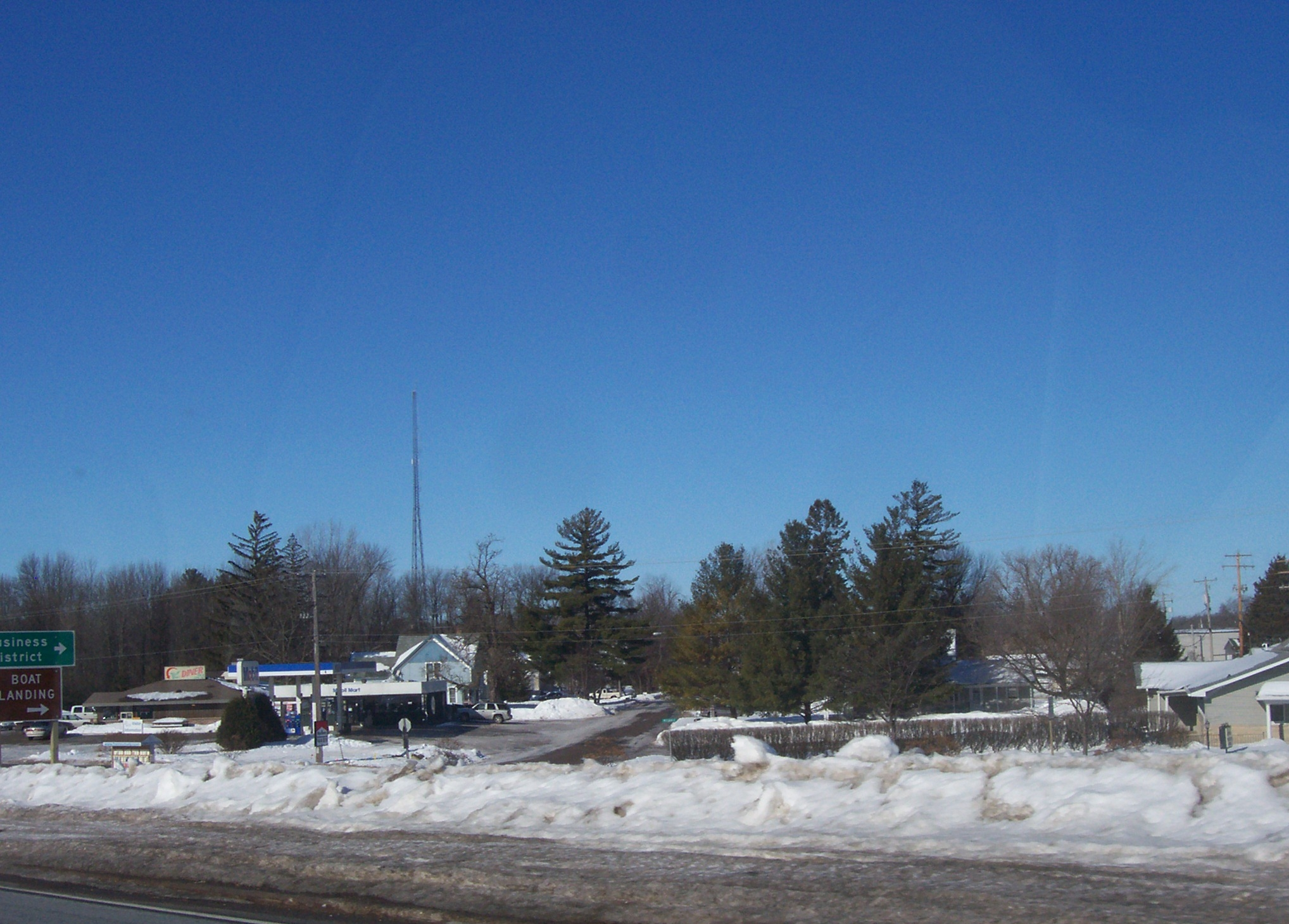
Looking north at Fremont from U.S. Route 10

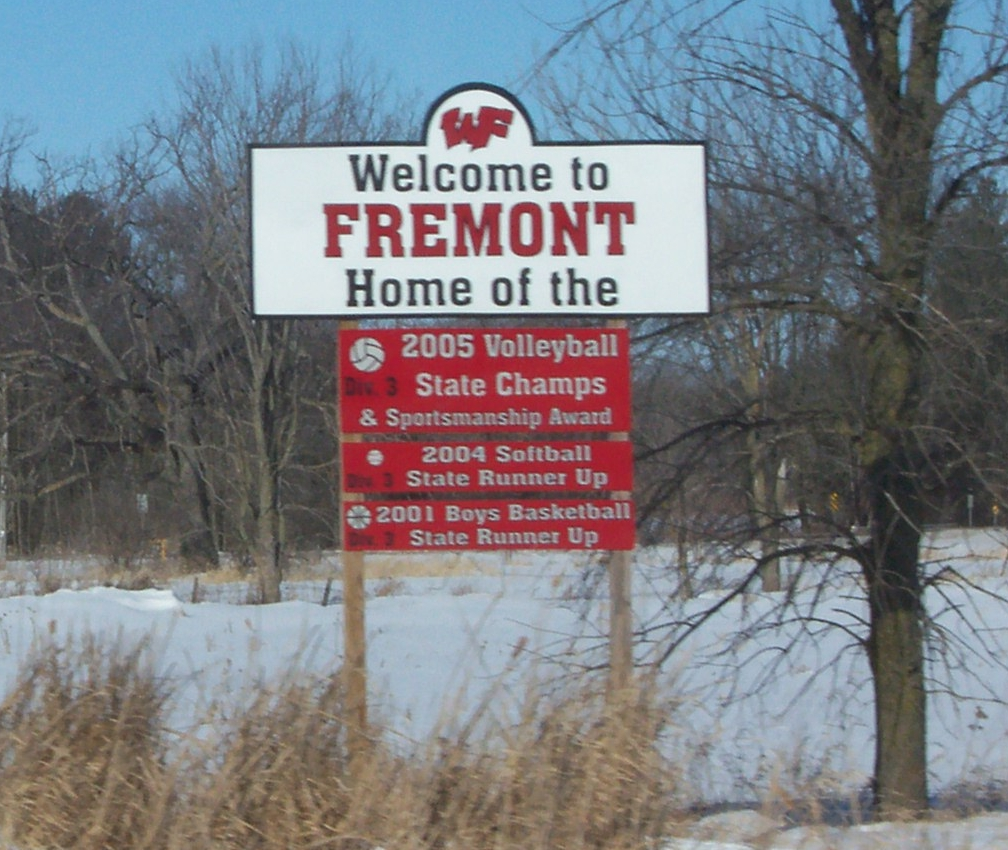
Welcome sign

Fremont is a village in Waupaca County, Wisconsin, United States. It is surrounded by Town of Fremont. The population was 689 at the 2020 census. Fremont has been referred to as the "White Bass Capital of the World."

== History ==
This area is of the traditional home of the Menominee and Potawatomi peoples. In the Menominee language it is known as Penāēwīkoh, "partridge place". It was ceded by the Menominee to the United States in the 1836 Treaty of the Cedars, following years of negotiations between the Menominee, Ho-Chunk, and United States over how to accommodate the Oneida, Stockbridge-Munsee, and Brothertown peoples who were being removed from New York to Wisconsin. The Potawatomi had been forced to cede all of their lands in Wisconsin in 1833 due to poverty and in spite of their support of the United States in the Black Hawk War.

Now that the United States owned the land, white American settlement could begin in Penāēwīkoh. The Town of Fremont was first settled in the spring of 1849 by D. Gordon. The first paper published was the Fremont Pioneer in 1857. The first church (Presbyterian) was built in 1873. The village of Fremont was organized in 1888.

The story of the "Death of Wau-Ke-John", a war chief of the Menominee, takes place in the summer of 1852 as reported by W. A. Springer "who was in the neighborhood ... and was present at the funeral".

== Geography ==
Fremont is located at 44°15′43″N 88°52′12″W (44.261991, -88.870059).

According to the United States Census Bureau, the village has a total area of 1.20 square miles (3.11 km^{2}), of which 1.03 square miles (2.67 km^{2}) is land and 0.17 square miles (0.44 km^{2}) is water.

=== Wolf River ===
The Wolf River flows through the middle of the village, with Partridge Lake just upriver. A spawning run of white bass, or sand bass (Morone chrysops), not to be confused with its larger cousin the "striped bass," occurs twice a year - in May around Mother's Day and in late September to early October. Lake sturgeon from Lake Winnebago travel upriver to the Fremont area in spring to spawn. Fremont is known as "the white bass capital of the world".

== Demographics ==
Historical population
Census	Pop.	Note	%±
1880	303		—
1890	275		−9.2%
1900	263		−4.4%
1910	305		16.0%
1920	374		22.6%
1930	416		11.2%
1940	437		5.0%
1950	504		15.3%
1960	575		14.1%
1970	598		4.0%
1980	510		−14.7%
1990	632		23.9%
2000	666		5.4%
2010	679		2.0%
2020	689		1.5%
U.S. Decennial Census

=== 2010 census ===
As of the census of 2010, there were 679 people, 305 households, and 200 families living in the village. The population density was 659.2 inhabitants per square mile (254.5/km^{2}). There were 408 housing units at an average density of 396.1 per square mile (152.9/km^{2}). The racial makeup of the village was 98.7% White, 0.1% African American, 0.4% Asian, 0.1% Pacific Islander, 0.1% from other races, and 0.4% from two or more races. Hispanic or Latino of any race were 2.1% of the population.

There were 305 households, of which 27.2% had children under the age of 18 living with them, 52.1% were married couples living together, 7.9% had a female householder with no husband present, 5.6% had a male householder with no wife present, and 34.4% were non-families. 29.2% of all households were made up of individuals, and 16.4% had someone living alone who was 65 years of age or older. The average household size was 2.23 and the average family size was 2.72.

The median age in the village was 43.2 years. 20.8% of residents were under the age of 18; 6% were between the ages of 18 and 24; 24.3% were from 25 to 44; 29.7% were from 45 to 64; and 19.1% were 65 years of age or older. The gender makeup of the village was 51.0% male and 49.0% female.

=== 2000 census ===
As of the census of 2000, there were 666 people, 302 households, and 189 families living in the village. The population density was 637.2 people per square mile (244.9/km^{2}). There were 406 housing units at an average density of 388.4 per square mile (149.3/km^{2}). The racial makeup of the village was 98.80% White, 0.15% Black or African American, 0.15% Native American, 0.15% from other races, and 0.75% from two or more races. 1.05% of the population were Hispanic or Latino of any race.

There were 302 households, out of which 22.2% had children under the age of 18 living with them, 53.6% were married couples living together, 5.0% had a female householder with no husband present, and 37.4% were non-families. 30.8% of all households were made up of individuals, and 15.6% had someone living alone who was 65 years of age or older. The average household size was 2.21 and the average family size was 2.76.

In the village, the population was spread out, with 18.9% under the age of 18, 8.4% from 18 to 24, 29.7% from 25 to 44, 24.8% from 45 to 64, and 18.2% who were 65 years of age or older. The median age was 41 years. For every 100 females, there were 101.2 males. For every 100 females age 18 and over, there were 103.8 males.

The median income for a household in the village was $41,250, and the median income for a family was $51,111. Males had a median income of $37,019 versus $24,375 for females. The per capita income for the village was $20,430. About 5.0% of families and 7.9% of the population were below the poverty line, including 10.0% of those under age 18 and 13.8% of those age 65 or over.

== Education ==
The Fremont Elementary School, which serves grades PreK-5, on 4.1 acres (17,000 m^{2}) immediately east of the U.S. Post Office, is part of the Weyauwega-Fremont School District.

St. John’s Lutheran School is a Christian school of the Wisconsin Evangelical Lutheran Synod in Fremont.

== Notable people ==
- Emil H. Steiger, Wisconsin State Representative and businessman, was born in Fremont.
