= Wild Rose, Wisconsin =

- Village
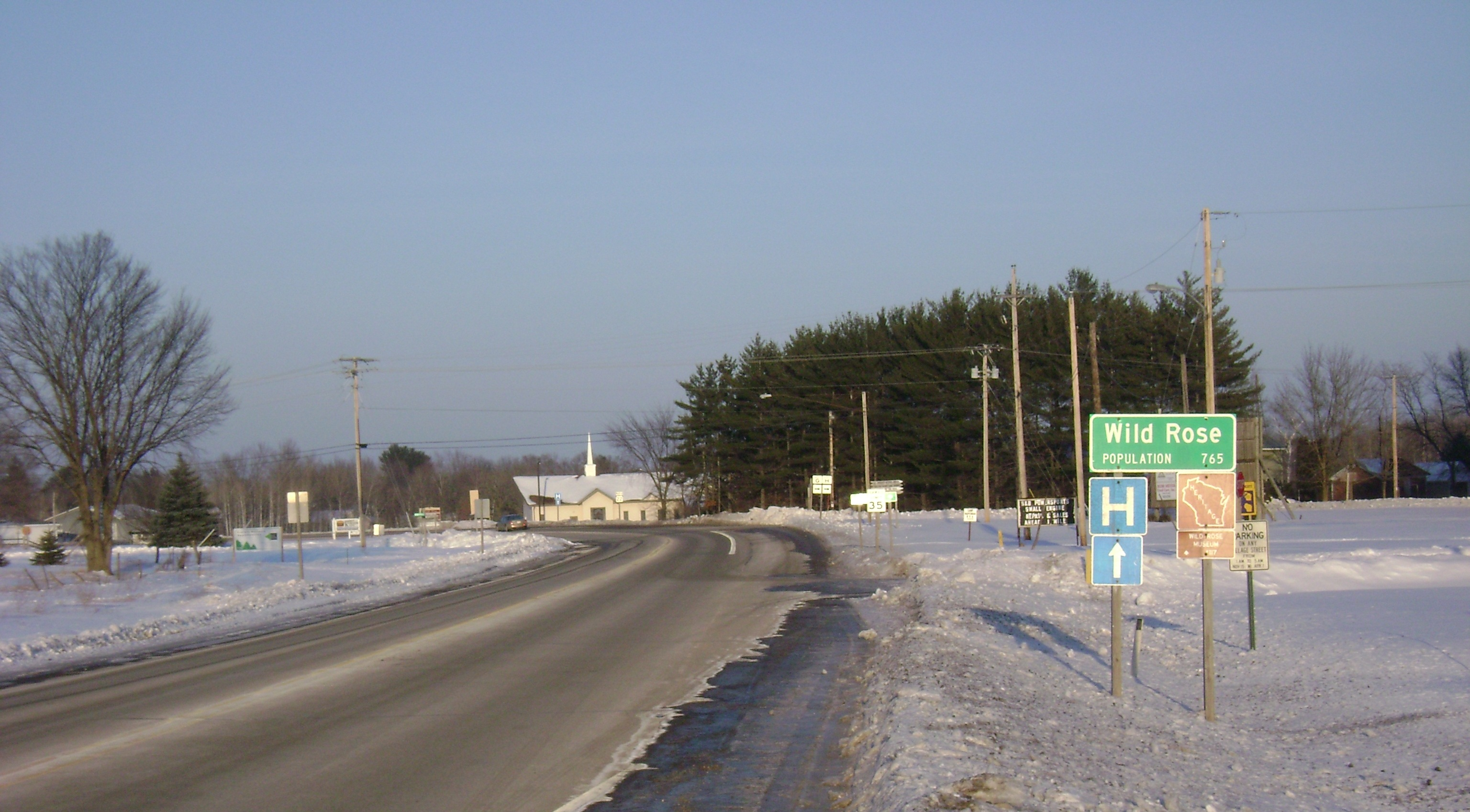

- Location of Wild Rose in Waushara County, Wisconsin.
- Coordinates: 44°10′37″N 89°14′46″W
- Country: United States
- State: Wisconsin
- County: Waushara

Area
  - Total: 1.48 sq mi (3.83 km^{2})
  - Land: 1.46 sq mi (3.77 km^{2})
  - Water: 0.023 sq mi (0.06 km^{2})
- Elevation: 950 ft (290 m)

Population (2020)
  - Total: 780
  - Density: 540/sq mi (210/km^{2})
- Time zone: UTC-6 (Central (CST))
  - Summer (DST): UTC-5 (CDT)
- Area code: 920
- FIPS code: 55-87075
- GNIS feature ID: 1576731
- Website: www.villageofwildrose.com

Wild Rose is a village in Waushara County, Wisconsin, United States. The population was 780 at the 2020 census.

== History ==
A post office called Wild Rose has been in operation since 1873. The village was named from wild rose bushes near the original town site, although many early settlers arrived from Rose, New York in the mid 1850's and the town may be named Wild Rose in reference to Rose, NY.

The Wild Rose Historical Society maintains Pioneer Museum on Main Street in Wild Rose.

== Geography ==
Wild Rose is located at 44°10′37″N 89°14′46″W (44.177054, -89.246242).

According to the United States Census Bureau, the village has a total area of 1.55 square miles (4.01 km^{2}), of which 1.53 square miles (3.96 km^{2}) is land and 0.02 square miles (0.05 km^{2}) is water.

== Demographics ==
Historical population
Census	Pop.	Note	%±
1880	25		—
1910	551		—
1920	576		4.5%
1930	512		−11.1%
1940	559		9.2%
1950	582		4.1%
1960	594		2.1%
1970	585		−1.5%
1980	741		26.7%
1990	676		−8.8%
2000	765		13.2%
2010	725		−5.2%
2020	780		7.6%
U.S. Decennial Census

=== 2010 census ===
As of the census of 2010, there were 725 people, 316 households, and 174 families living in the village. The population density was 473.9 inhabitants per square mile (183.0/km^{2}). There were 377 housing units at an average density of 246.4 per square mile (95.1/km^{2}). The racial makeup of the village was 95.9% White, 0.7% Native American, 0.6% Asian, 1.8% from other races, and 1.1% from two or more races. Hispanic or Latino of any race were 4.8% of the population.

There were 316 households, of which 24.1% had children under the age of 18 living with them, 40.5% were married couples living together, 11.4% had a female householder with no husband present, 3.2% had a male householder with no wife present, and 44.9% were non-families. 42.4% of all households were made up of individuals, and 24.6% had someone living alone who was 65 years of age or older. The average household size was 2.05 and the average family size was 2.78.

The median age in the village was 49.4 years. 19.2% of residents were under the age of 18; 3.8% were between the ages of 18 and 24; 19.4% were from 25 to 44; 25.1% were from 45 to 64; and 32.4% were 65 years of age or older. The gender makeup of the village was 45.0% male and 55.0% female.

=== 2000 census ===
As of the census of 2000, there were 765 people, 312 households, and 186 families living in the village. The population density was 580.1 people per square mile (223.8/km^{2}). There were 339 housing units at an average density of 257.0 per square mile (99.2/km^{2}). The racial makeup of the village was 97.25% White, 0.78% African American, 0.13% Native American, 0.26% Asian, 0.92% from other races, and 0.65% from two or more races. Hispanic or Latino of any race were 2.22% of the population.

There were 312 households, out of which 29.5% had children under the age of 18 living with them, 43.9% were married couples living together, 11.2% had a female householder with no husband present, and 40.1% were non-families. 36.9% of all households were made up of individuals, and 19.6% had someone living alone who was 65 years of age or older. The average household size was 2.26 and the average family size was 2.97.

In the village, the population was spread out, with 23.5% under the age of 18, 5.8% from 18 to 24, 22.7% from 25 to 44, 21.3% from 45 to 64, and 26.7% who were 65 years of age or older. The median age was 43 years. For every 100 females, there were 83.5 males. For every 100 females age 18 and over, there were 76.7 males.

The median income for a household in the village was $30,655, and the median income for a family was $37,361. Males had a median income of $32,188 versus $20,438 for females. The per capita income for the village was $18,887. About 4.2% of families and 6.6% of the population were below the poverty line, including 4.1% of those under age 18 and 12.8% of those age 65 or over.

== Notable Person ==
- Boyd A. Clark, Wisconsin State Representative and jurist, was born in Wild Rose

== Images ==
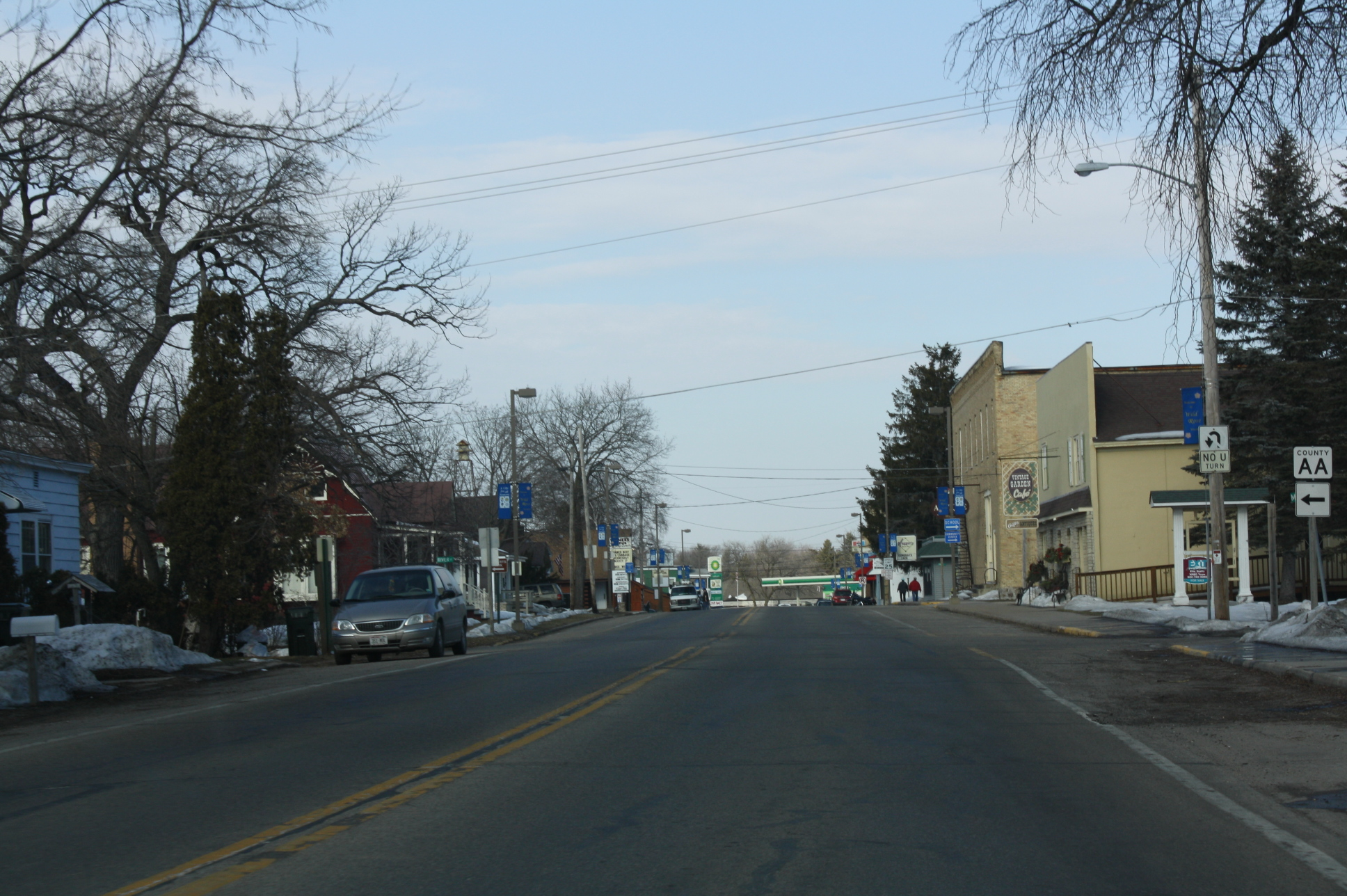
Downtown Wild Rose

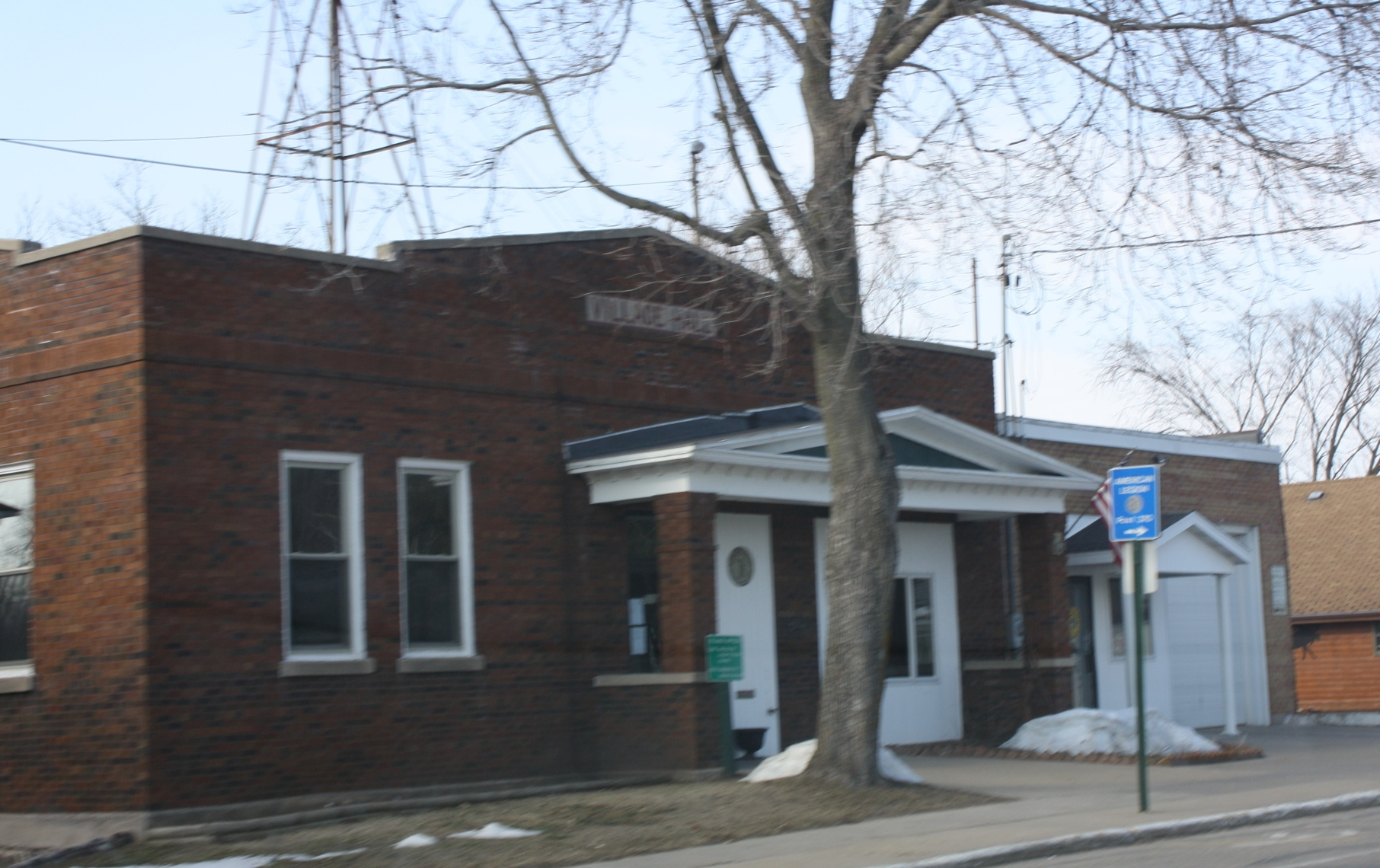
Village hall
