= U.S. Route 151 =

Highway in Iowa and Wisconsin

U.S. Route 151
- US 151 highlighted in red

Route information
- Auxiliary route of US 51
- Length: 324 mi (521 km)
- Existed: 1926–present

Major junctions
- South end: I-80 near Williamsburg, IA
- US 6 at the Amana Colonies; US 30 / US 218 in Cedar Rapids, IA; I-380 / US 218 / Iowa 27 in Cedar Rapids, IA; US 52 near Dubuque, IA; US 20 in Dubuque, IA; US 61 from Dubuque to Dickeyville, WI; US 12 / US 14 / US 18 in Madison, WI; US 51 in Madison, WI; I-39 / I-90 / I-94 in Madison, WI; I-41 / US 41 / US 45 in Fond du Lac, WI
- North end: I-43 / WIS 42 in Manitowoc, WI

Location
- Country: United States
- States: Iowa; Wisconsin
- Counties: Iowa; Iowa; Benton; Linn; Jones; Dubuque; Wisconsin; Grant; Lafayette; Iowa; Dane; Columbia; Dodge; Fond du Lac; Calumet; Manitowoc

Highway system
- United States Numbered Highway System; List; Special; Divided
- Iowa Primary Highway System; Interstate; US; State; Secondary; Scenic
- Wisconsin State Trunk Highway System; Interstate; US; State; Scenic; Rustic
← Iowa 150	IA	→ Iowa 152
← WIS 150	WI	→ WIS 152
← WIS 117	US 118	→ WIS 118

U.S. Highway 151 (US 151) is a United States Numbered Highway that runs through the states of Iowa and Wisconsin. The southern terminus for US 151 is at a junction with Interstate 80 (I-80) in Iowa County, Iowa, and its northern terminus is at Manitowoc, Wisconsin. The route, from south to north follows a northeasterly path through the two states.

US 151 is an important corridor which connects Cedar Rapids, Iowa to Fond du Lac, Wisconsin with an expressway (except for a segment about ten miles where it uses arterial roads instead in Madison, Wisconsin).

Approximately seven miles (11 km) south of Dubuque, Iowa, US 151 joins with US 61. The two highways share a route from there to Dickeyville, Wisconsin. Five miles (8.0 km) south of Dubuque, US 61/US 151 joins with US 52 and shares a route with US 52 until it veers south in Key West.

In Wisconsin, US 61/US 151 joins with Wisconsin Highway 35 (WIS 35) about one mile (1.6 km) north of the Iowa–Wisconsin border. At Dickeyville, US 151 splits off and heads northeast to Platteville. US 61/WIS 35 continues north. US 151 later joins with US 18 near Dodgeville. The two highways share a route all the way to Madison.

== Route description ==
=== Iowa ===
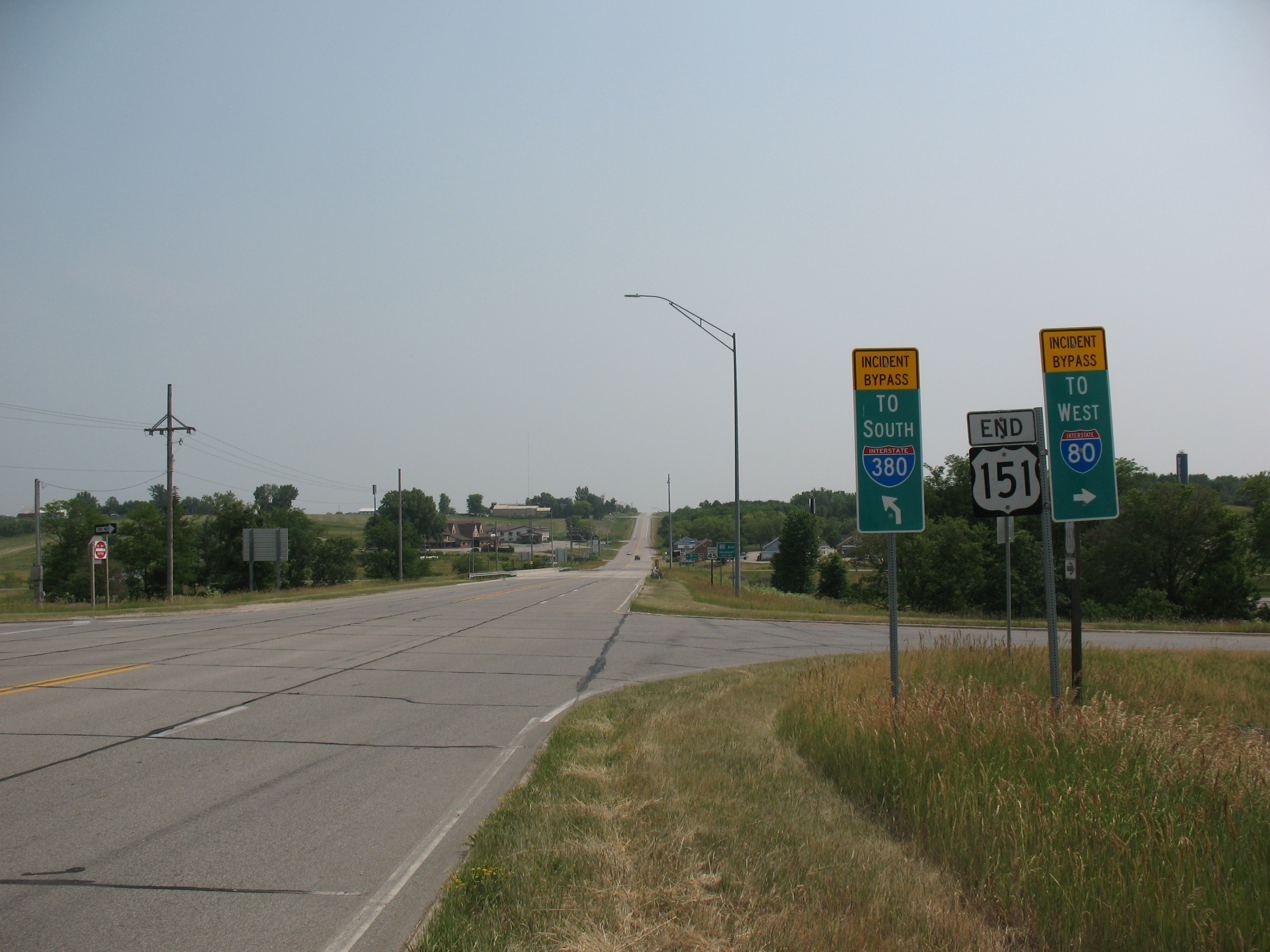
The southern terminus of US 151 at I-80

US 151 begins at exit 225 along I-80 in rural Iowa County north of Williamsburg. The highway heads to the north and intersects US 6 outside of Homestead, Iowa. US 151 turns east onto US 6 and the two routes run concurrently for about two miles (3 km) until US 6 splits to the east at Homestead. US 151 continues to the north and crosses the Iowa River on its way to Amana, the main village of the Amana Colonies and the eastern end of Iowa Highway 220 (Iowa 220). The road clips the southeastern corner of Benton County, Iowa at Walford and it turns to the northeast toward Fairfax. When it reaches the US 30 / US 218 freeway in Cedar Rapids, US 151 turns east onto the highway while US 151 Business continues northeast on Williams Boulevard SW. The freeway is dotted with interchanges providing access to southern Cedar Rapids, most importantly Edgewood Road SW, I-380, and C Street SW. Just east of the Cedar River, US 151 exits from US 30, which continues east toward Clinton.

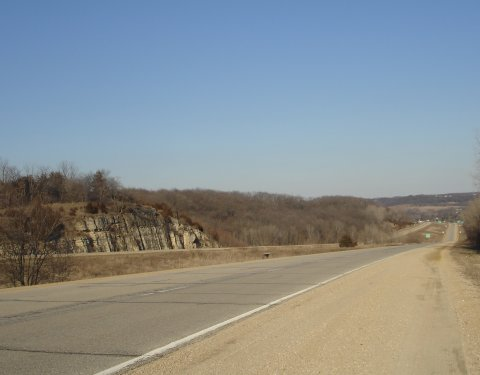
US 151, approximately eight miles (13 km) south of Dubuque, Iowa; a scene from the movie Field of Dreams was filmed on this particular segment of the highway.

The route splits from the other roads and continues toward Dubuque as an expressway. This 65-mile (105 km) stretch crosses many major rivers including both the Wapsipinicon and the Maquoketa. The road eventually goes into the Driftless Area where it meets up with US 61 around the Dubuque Regional Airport. US 52 briefly joins the two routes, concurrently, for two miles south of Dubuque. The combined road then heads into the state of Wisconsin.

=== Dubuque to Madison ===
US 61/US 151 crosses the Mississippi River into Wisconsin via the Dubuque-Wisconsin Bridge from Dubuque, Iowa and passes through a cut in the river ridge before turning northward to the western terminus of WIS 11 after one mile (1.6 km) of due east travel. WIS 35 and the Great River Road join the route at that interchange, heading north. The highway at this point is limited access highway with two lanes in each direction. The northward trek of the route passes through mixed residential and farmland as it crosses Badger Road and merges with Eagle Point Road. Eagle Point road merges with US 151 from the left side of the road. The limited access portion ends at this interchange. Another pair of half diamond interchanges connect the highway with County Trunk Highway HHH (CTH-HHH) and CTH-H as it bypasses Kieler to the northwest. At Dickeyville, US 61, WIS 35 and the Great River Road route exit north off of US 151 into town. US 151 passes Dickeyville to the east and descends into a valley cut northeast of the village, paralleling the Little Platte River and Blockhouse Creek within the valley for a one-mile (1.6 km) stretch before climbing back onto the ridge top on the other side of the valley. US 151 then approaches Platteville and enters a section of limited access at CTH-D (US 151 Business). The limited access stretch ends after three interchanges six miles (9.7 km) to the east. The last of the interchanges is WIS 126/CTH-G with access to Belmont. The route turns northeastward from this point, crosses the Cottage Inn Branch and begins the first of several descents into valleys, two of which are prior to passing Mineral Point and another two while passing the city.

The highway is limited access between the two interchanges that provide access to Mineral Point: CTH-O and WIS 23. WIS 23 joins US 151 heading northbound at that point until the first interchange at Dodgeville. This interchange begins another short stretch of freeway to the point where US 18 joins the route. US 18/US 151 heads eastbound past that interchange.

The section of expressway past Dodgeville passes Ridgeway and Barneveld. Access to Ridgeway is by an interchange and a surface intersection with a short business route on CTH-HHH. The interchange was previously an intersection; however, it was announced in 2011 that the first intersection would be closed, and an exit would be constructed, due to the numerous fatal accidents that happen at the intersection each year. Access to Barneveld is at an interchange with CTH-ID and an at-grade intersection with CTH-K. CTH-ID parallels US 18/US 151 for the entire stretch between Barneveld and Mount Horeb. A section of freeway begins at WIS 78 and ends at the other end of CTH-ID as the highway bypasses Mount Horeb just to the south of the city's passing residential subdivisions. A mix of grade separation and level intersections cross the winding highway as it continues eastward until the interchange with CTH-MV (Verona Avenue) begins a section of freeway that bypasses Verona to the south. This section provides access to four interchanges including the two endpoints of CTH-MV. The freeway continues into Fitchburg and provides access to two interchanges at CTH-PD (McKee Road) and Williamsburg Way. The freeway then ends. The road continues as an urban multilane highway known as Verona Road as it enters Madison. Verona Road passes through a residential and commercial area on the Southwest Side of Madison. US 18 and US 151 merge east on the West Beltline Highway—joining US 12 and US 14.

=== Madison metropolitan area ===
The four US Highways run concurrently for about three miles (4.8 km) to Park Street. At this interchange, US 14 turns south off the beltline towards Oregon, and US 151 turns north and into central Madison on South Park Street. It crosses the same railroad corridor and passes Monona Bay to the west along South Park Street. US 151 turns northeast onto West Washington Avenue for about 1,500 feet (460 m) then follows Proudfit Street and North Shore Drive—paralleling the Monona Bay shore—and turns north onto John Nolen Drive. The street passes under the Monona Terrace Convention Center as it passes to the south and east of downtown Madison. US 151 turns northwest onto South Blair Street for three city blocks to East Washington Avenue—where it turns northeast and follows East Washington Avenue, bisecting the Madison Isthmus, and leading out of the city to the east. The western terminus of WIS 30 meets US 151 about three miles (4.8 km) northeast of the South Blair Street turn, and US 51 crosses US 151 one mile (1.6 km) further northeast.

=== Madison to Fond du Lac ===
At a cloverleaf interchange with I-39/I-90/I-94, a section of freeway begins and continues along US 151 northeast through commercial zones into residential areas. A highway bypass was constructed north and west of Sun Prairie, but so much commercial and residential development subsequently happened to the north and west of the bypass that the route essentially divides Sun Prairie in half. The route now has four interchanges with highways and streets in Sun Prairie. After Sun Prairie, US 151 passes through farmland, heading toward Columbus. The highway bypasses the city via a partial beltline to the north and east, completely clearing the city. WIS 16 and WIS 60 crosses under US 151 about midway along the Columbus bypass. US 151 becomes an expressway with level intersections after the interchange with WIS 73 at the end of the bypass portion. The route becomes a freeway at Beaver Dam, bypassing the city to the southeast. The route follows the edge of residential zones of the city before passing an industrial area at the northeastern end of the bypass. US 151 crosses at-grade intersections after the interchange with CTH-A northeast of Beaver Dam and encounters one more freeway section at Waupun, bypassing the city to the east. The four-lane expressway of US 151 continues east, bypassing Fond du Lac to the south and east. This expressway provides a mixture of at-grade intersections and grade-separated interchanges at I-41/US& 41 and WIS 23. WisDOT currently is studying changes to two sections of US 151. The first study would preserve the Fond du Lac Bypass from I-41 to WIS 23, with the ultimate goal being freeway conversion. The second study is examining freeway conversions to the route from WIS 73 in Columbus to WIS 49 in Waupun.

=== Fond du Lac to Manitowoc ===
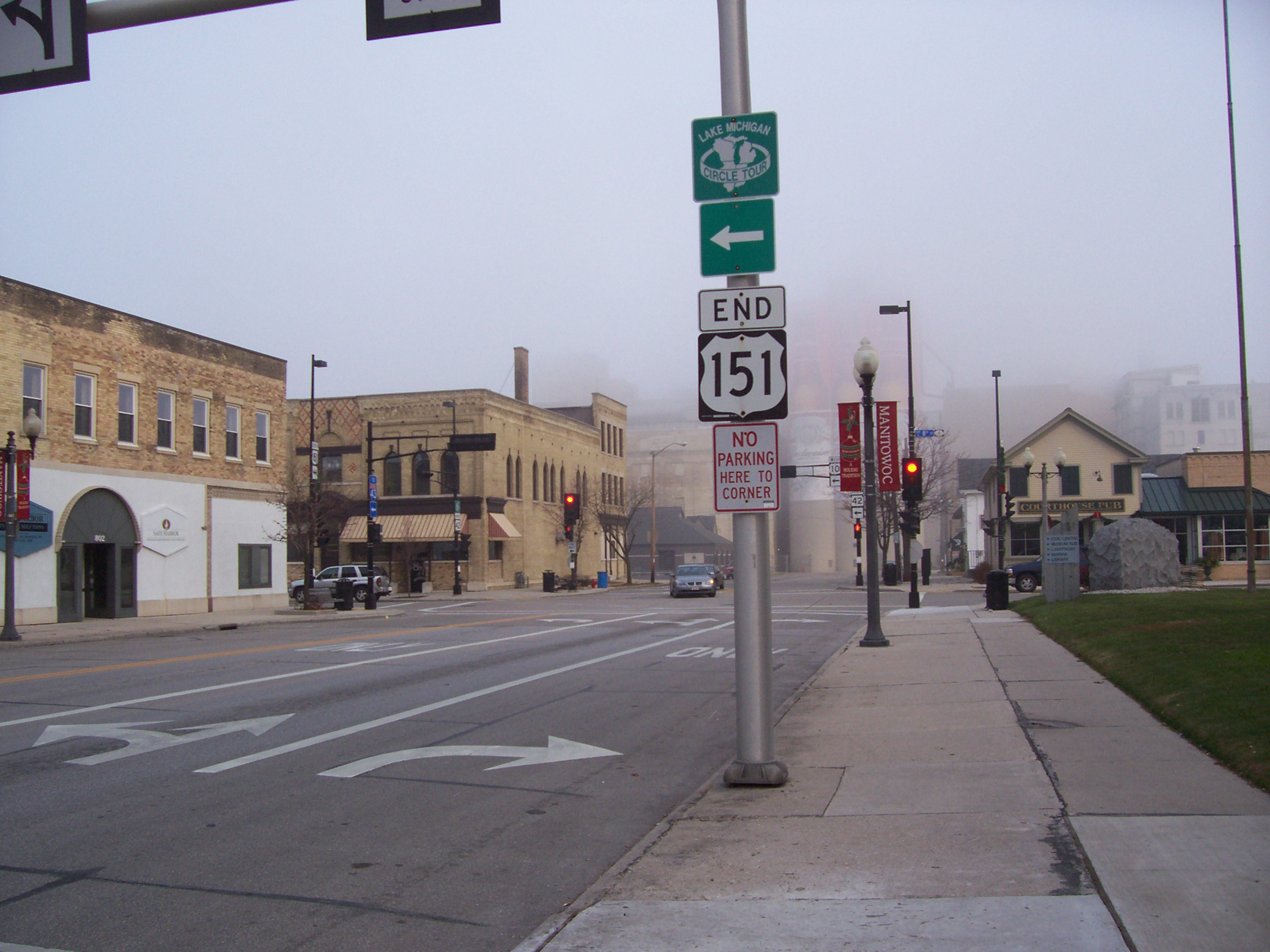
The northeast terminus at US 10 in Manitowoc

The multi-lane section of US 151 ends after turning north away from Fond du Lac and the route follows the east shore of Lake Winnebago for about half the length of the shoreline. US 151 then turns east at the intersection with WIS 55 and follows two-lane surface roads and briefly running concurrently with WIS 32 and WIS 57 in Chilton. The roadway passes through farmland throughout this section until it picks up WIS 42 just outside of Manitowoc and ends at I-43 while WIS 42 continues east into Manitowoc.

== History ==
U.S. Highway 118
- Location: Dodgeville to Dickeyville, Wisconsin
- Existed: 1926–1934

US 151 was one of the original U.S. Highways from 1926. At the time, it only ran from Fond du Lac, Wisconsin, to Madison. In 1934, the highway was extended southwest to Cedar Rapids, Iowa, incorporating the full length of former U.S. Highway 118 (Dodgeville to Dickeyville) and part of former U.S. Route 161 (Dubuque to Cedar Rapids; US 161 from Cedar Rapids south to Keokuk became US 218). At the time, the southern end of the route was at Williams Blvd SW and 16th Ave SW, what was then US 30 and US 218. In the 1940s, the highway was extended northeast to Manitowoc.

In the 2020s, the corridor from the Iowa state line to Fond du Lac was designated as an Alternative Fuel Corridor for electric vehicles.

=== Illinois ===
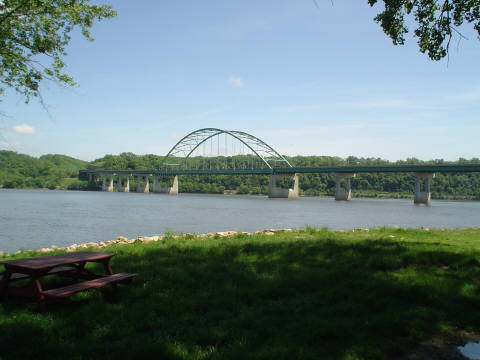
The Dubuque-Wisconsin Bridge, Dubuque, Iowa. The bridge crosses the Mississippi River between Dubuque and Grant County, Wisconsin. The bridge is part of the US 61 / US 151 route.

In 1969, the Eagle Point Bridge, which connected US 151 and US 61 with Wisconsin, was closed, and those highways were rerouted over the Julien Dubuque Bridge with US 20 from Dubuque to East Dubuque, Illinois. The route then followed Illinois Route 35 and WIS 35 north to what is now the current highway. In 1982, the Dubuque-Wisconsin Bridge opened, the old Eagle Point Bridge was demolished, and US 151 and US 61 were rerouted onto the new bridge. This is the only instance of US 61 and US 151 entering Illinois.

=== Routings ===
In 1981, the southern terminus of the highway was extended once again when the US 30 bypass was built. The southern terminus was at the US 151 and 30 interchange. By 1986, the main US 151 was rerouted onto state highway 13 and US 30 to bypass Cedar Rapids. The previous route through Cedar Rapids was renamed US 151 Business (though the official state designation for it is Iowa 922). Finally, in 1989, US 151 was extended to its current southern end at exit 225 along I-80. This extension followed the old route of Iowa 149. As a result, US 151 became the main route through the Amana Colonies.

US 151's northern terminus was changed in 2022 to end at I-43 instead of in downtown Manitowoc where WIS 42 traveled through before being rerouted onto I-43 in 1980.

A project expanding 18 miles of US 151 and adding bypasses of Dickeyville and Platteville was completed in 2005 at a cost of $100.3 million. Based on faulty traffic projections, this project was included in WisPIRGs list of highway boondoggles.

== Future ==
The Wisconsin Department of Transportation (WisDOT) has proposed rerouting US 151 onto US 12/US 18 and I-39/I-90/I-94 in the Madison area. If implemented, the department would remove the "Connecting Highway" designation from portions of US 151 through Madison, including South Park Street, Blair Street, John Nolen Drive, North Shore Drive, Proudfit Street and West Washington Avenue. East Washington Avenue would remain a Connecting Highway under a new designation as WIS X151.

== Exit list ==
State	County	Location	mi	km	Exit	Destinations	Notes
Iowa	Iowa	Iowa Township	0.000	0.000		I-80 / CR W21 south – Davenport, Des Moines	
Iowa	Iowa	Iowa Township	5.646	9.086		US 6 west – Marengo	Southern end of US 6 overlap
Iowa	Iowa	Amana Colonies	7.588	12.212		US 6 east – Coralville	Northern end of US 6 overlap
Iowa	Iowa	Amana Colonies	10.502	16.901		Iowa 220 west – High Amana, Middle Amana, East Amana	
Iowa	Benton	No major junctions					
Iowa	Linn	Cedar Rapids	24.364– 24.787	39.210– 39.891	248	US 30 west / US 218 north / US 151 Bus. north (Williams Boulevard SW) – Cedar Rapids, Tama	Southern end of US 30 and US 218 overlaps
Iowa	Linn	Cedar Rapids	26.121	42.038	250	Edgewood Road SW	
Iowa	Linn	Cedar Rapids	28.008	45.075	252A	6th Street SW	Former US 218
Iowa	Linn	Cedar Rapids	28.342	45.612	252B-C	I-380 / US 218 south / Iowa 27 – Cedar Rapids, Iowa City, Airport	Northern end of US 218 overlap; signed as exits 252B (southbound) and 252C (northbound)
Iowa	Linn	Cedar Rapids	29.019	46.702	253	Bowling Street SW, Kirkwood Boulevard SW	
Iowa	Linn	Cedar Rapids	30.017	48.308	254	CR W6E (C Street SW) – Ely	
Iowa	Linn	Bertram Township	34.955– 35.416	56.255– 56.997	259	US 30 east / Iowa 13 begins – Mount Vernon	Northern end of US 30 overlap; southern end of Iowa 13 overlap
Iowa	Linn	Bertram Township	39.007	62.776		Lincoln Highway Heritage Byway / CR E48 (Mount Vernon Road)	Former US 30
Iowa	Linn	Marion	42.030	67.641		Iowa 100 west / CR E45 – Marion	
Iowa	Linn	Marion	43.120	69.395		US 151 Bus. south / Iowa 13 north – Marion, Central City	Northern end of Iowa 13 overlap
Iowa	Jones	Fairview	54.640	87.935	49	Iowa 1 south / CR E34 – Martelle, Mount Vernon	Former US 151
Iowa	Jones	Anamosa	59.725	96.118	54	Iowa 64 east / CR E28 – Anamosa	
Iowa	Jones	Anamosa	60.674	97.645		Old Dubuque Road	Former US 151
Iowa	Jones	Monticello	68.432	110.131	63	US 151 Bus. / CR X44 – Monticello	US 151 Business only signed northbound
Iowa	Jones	Monticello	70.649	113.699	65	Iowa 38 – Monticello, Hopkinton	
Iowa	Jones	Lovell Township	72.566	116.784		US 151 Bus. – Monticello	US 151 Business only signed southbound
Iowa	Jones	Richland Township	79.454	127.869		US 151 Bus. – Cascade	US 151 Business only signed northbound
Iowa	Dubuque	Cascade	80.687	129.853	75	Iowa 136 – Cascade, Dyersville	
Iowa	Dubuque	Cascade	82.210	132.304	77	US 151 Bus. – Cascade, Farley	US 151 Business only signed southbound
Iowa	Dubuque	Table Mound Township	98.361	158.297		Military Road	Former US 151
Iowa	Dubuque	Table Mound Township	99.962– 100.580	160.873– 161.868	—	US 61 south – Maquoketa	Southern end of US 61 overlap
Iowa	Dubuque	Table Mound Township	101.097	162.700	184	US 52 north – Peosta, Waterloo	Southern end of US 52 overlap
Iowa	Dubuque	Dubuque	102.698	165.276		Maquoketa Drive	Former US 61 / US 151
Iowa	Dubuque	Dubuque	103.114	165.946	—	US 52 south / Great River Road south – Bellevue	Northern end of US 52 overlap; southern end of Great River Road overlap
Iowa	Dubuque	Dubuque	104.447	168.091	187	Grandview Avenue	
Iowa	Dubuque	Dubuque	104.743– 104.987	168.568– 168.960	188	To US 20 (Locust Street)	Northbound exit and southbound entrance only
Iowa	Dubuque	Dubuque	105.756	170.198	—	To US 20 (Locust Street Connector)	
Iowa	Dubuque	Dubuque	106.024	170.629	189A	White Street / Port of Dubuque	Northbound exit and southbound entrance only
Iowa	Dubuque	Dubuque	106.407– 106.551	171.245– 171.477	189B	9th Street / 11th Street / Great River Road north	Former US 52 / Iowa 3; northern end of Great River Road overlap
Iowa	Dubuque	Dubuque	107.188– 107.899	172.502– 173.647	190	Kerper Boulevard / Eagle Point District	Former US 61 / US 151
Mississippi River			108.151 0	174.052 0.0	Dubuque–Wisconsin Bridge; Iowa–Wisconsin state line		
Wisconsin	Grant	Town of Jamestown			1	WIS 11 west / WIS 35 south / Great River Road south – Janesville, East Dubuque	Southern end of WIS 35 overlap
Wisconsin	Grant	Town of Jamestown			2	Badger Road, Eagle Point Road	Northbound exit and southbound entrance only
Wisconsin	Grant	Town of Jamestown			3	Badger Road, Eagle Point Road	Southbound exit and northbound entrance only; Old U.S. 151
Wisconsin	Grant	Kieler			5	CTH-HHH to CTH-H – Kieler, Louisburg	
Wisconsin	Grant	Kieler			5	CTH-H to CTH-HHH – Kieler, Louisburg	
Wisconsin	Grant	Dickeyville			8	US 61 north / WIS 35 north / Great River Road north / CTH-HH – Dickeyville, Lancaster	Northern end of US 61 and WIS 35 overlaps
Wisconsin	Grant	Town of Platteville			18	Bus. US 151 / CTH-D – Platteville	US 151 Business only signed northbound; exit for UW-Platteville
Wisconsin	Grant	Platteville			19	WIS 80 / WIS 81 – Platteville, Darlington, Lancaster	
Wisconsin	Grant	Platteville			21	Bus. US 151 / CTH-XX – Platteville	US 151 Business only signed southbound
Wisconsin	Lafayette	Belmont			26	WIS 126 south / CTH-G – Belmont, Rewey	
Wisconsin	Iowa	Town of Mineral Point			37	Bus. US 151 / CTH-O – Mineral Point	US 151 Business only signed northbound
Wisconsin	Iowa	Mineral Point			40	Bus. US 151 south to WIS 23 / WIS 39 – Mineral Point, Darlington, Hollandale	US 151 Business only signed southbound; Southern end of WIS 23 overlap
Wisconsin	Iowa	Town of Dodgeville			44	WIS 23 north – Dodgeville, Spring Green, Wisconsin Dells	Northern end of WIS 23 overlap
Wisconsin	Iowa	Town of Dodgeville			47	US 18 west – Dodgeville, Prairie du Chien	Southern end of US 18 overlap
Wisconsin	Iowa	Town of Ridgeway			52	CTH-BB south (Ridgevue Road) / CTH-HHH – Ridgeway	
Wisconsin	Iowa	Barneveld			58	CTH-ID west – Blue Mounds, Arena	
Wisconsin	Dane	Town of Blue Mounds			65	Bus. US 18 / Bus. US 151 / WIS 78 – Mount Horeb, Blanchardville	US 18 Business / US 151 Business only signed northbound
Wisconsin	Dane	Mount Horeb			69	Bus. US 18 / Bus. US 151 / CTH-ID – Mount Horeb	US 18 Business / US 151 Business only signed southbound
Wisconsin	Dane	Town of Springdale			70	CTH-PD to CTH-P – Cross Plains	
Wisconsin	Dane	Town of Verona			75	CTH-G (Dairy Ridge Road) – Mount Vernon	
Wisconsin	Dane	Verona			76	Bus. US 18 / Bus. US 151 / CTH-MV (W. Verona Avenue) / Epic Lane	US 18 Business / US 151 Business only signed northbound
Wisconsin	Dane	Verona			77	WIS 69 – Belleville, Monroe	
Wisconsin	Dane	Verona			79	CTH-PB to CTH-M / Alt. US 18 / Alt. US 151 – Paoli, Oregon	Alternate US 151 / Alternate US 18 only signed northbound
Wisconsin	Dane	Town of Verona			81	Bus. US 18 (E. Verona Avenue) / Bus. US 151 / CTH-MV – Verona	Southbound exit and northbound entrance only
Wisconsin	Dane	Fitchburg			83A	CTH-PD (McKee Road)	
Wisconsin	Dane	Fitchburg			83B	Williamsburg Way	
Wisconsin	Dane	Madison			258	US 12 west / US 14 west – Baraboo, La Crosse	Southern end of US 12 / US 14 overlap
Wisconsin	Dane	Madison			258A	Seminole Highway	Southbound exit and northbound entrance only
Wisconsin	Dane	Madison			259	Todd Drive	
Wisconsin	Dane	Madison			260	CTH-D (Fish Hatchery Road) – Fitchburg	Signed as exits 260A (southbound) and 260B (northbound)
Wisconsin	Dane	Madison			261	US 12 east / US 14 east / US 18 east / Alt. US 18 / Alt. US 151	Northern end of US 12 / US 14 / US 18 overlaps; Alternate US 151 / Alternate US 18 only signed southbound
Wisconsin	Dane	Madison				WIS 113 north (First Street)	
Wisconsin	Dane	Madison				WIS 30	
Wisconsin	Dane	Madison				US 51 (Stoughton Road)	
Wisconsin	Dane	Madison			97	I-39 / I-90 / I-94 – Milwaukee, Chicago, Wisconsin Dells	Signed as exits 97A (southbound) and 97B (northbound)
Wisconsin	Dane	Madison			98A	Nelson Road	Exits combined southbound
Wisconsin	Dane	Madison			98B	American Parkway	Exits combined southbound
Wisconsin	Dane	Sun Prairie			100	CTH-C (Reiner Road)	
Wisconsin	Dane	Sun Prairie			101	Bus. US 151 (Main Street)	US 151 Business only signed northbound
Wisconsin	Dane	Sun Prairie			102	WIS 19 (Windsor Street) – Waunakee, Marshall	
Wisconsin	Dane	Sun Prairie			103	Bus. US 151 (Bristol Street) / CTH-N	US 151 Business only signed southbound
Wisconsin	Dane	Town of Bristol			108	CTH-VV – East Bristol	
Wisconsin	Dane	Town of York			111	CTH-V – East Bristol	
Wisconsin	Columbia	Town of Columbus			115	Bus. US 151 / WIS 73 – Columbus, Marshall	US 151 Business only signed northbound
Wisconsin	Columbia	Columbus			118	WIS 16 / WIS 60 – Columbus, Portage, Fall River	
Wisconsin	Dodge	Town of Elba			120	Bus. US 151 / WIS 73 – Columbus, Randolph	US 151 Business only signed southbound
Wisconsin	Dodge	Beaver Dam			129	Bus. US 151 / CTH-D – Beaver Dam	
Wisconsin	Dodge	Beaver Dam			130	CTH-G – Lowell, Beaver Dam	
Wisconsin	Dodge	Beaver Dam			132	WIS 33 – Beaver Dam, Horicon	
Wisconsin	Dodge	Beaver Dam			134	Industrial Drive	Northbound exit and southbound entrance only
Wisconsin	Dodge	Beaver Dam			135	Bus. US 151 / CTH-B – Beaver Dam, Burnett	
Wisconsin	Dodge	Beaver Dam			136	CTH-A – Fox Lake	
Wisconsin	Dodge	Town of Chester			142	Bus. US 151 / CTH-M – Waupun	Northbound exit and southbound entrance only
Wisconsin	Dodge	Town of Chester			144	WIS 26 – Waupun, Juneau, Watertown	
Wisconsin	Dodge–Fond du Lac county line	Waupun			146	WIS 49 / Alt. I-41 south – Waupun, Brownsville	I-41 Alt follows WIS 49 east
Wisconsin	Fond du Lac	Town of Waupun			147	Bus. US 151 / WIS 26 south – Waupun	Southern end of WIS 26 overlap; southbound exit and northbound entrance only
Wisconsin	Fond du Lac	Town of Waupun			148	WIS 26 north – Rosendale, Oshkosh	Northern end of WIS 26 overlap
Wisconsin	Fond du Lac	Town of Fond du Lac			160	CTH-D (Military Road) – Oakfield	
Wisconsin	Fond du Lac	Fond du Lac			161	CTH-VVV (Hickory Street) / Alt. I-41 north	County VVV unsigned on exit ramps or exit signs; I-41 Alt follows CTH-VVV north
Wisconsin	Fond du Lac	Fond du Lac			162	WIS 175 south (Main Street)	
Wisconsin	Fond du Lac	Fond du Lac			—	I-41 / US 41 / US 45 north – Oshkosh, Green Bay, Milwaukee	Southern end of US 45 overlap
Wisconsin	Fond du Lac	Town of Fond du Lac			164	US 45 south (Fond du Lac Avenue) / CTH-V – Eden	Northern end of US 45 overlap
Wisconsin	Fond du Lac	Fond du Lac			168	WIS 23 (Johnson Street) – Sheboygan	
Wisconsin	Calumet	Town of Stockbridge				WIS 55 north – Sherwood, Kaukauna	
Wisconsin	Calumet	Chilton				WIS 32 north / WIS 57 north (Madison Street) – Green Bay	Southern end of WIS 32 / WIS 57 overlap
Wisconsin	Calumet	Chilton				WIS 32 south / WIS 57 south (E. Chestnut Street) – Milwaukee	Northern end of WIS 32 / WIS 57 overlap
Wisconsin	Manitowoc	Town of Eaton				WIS 67 south – Kiel	
Wisconsin	Manitowoc	Manitowoc				WIS 42 south – Howards Grove, Osman	Southern end of WIS 42 overlap
Wisconsin	Manitowoc	Manitowoc				I-43 / WIS 42 north / LMCT – Green Bay, Milwaukee	Northern end of WIS 42 overlap
1.000 mi = 1.609 km; 1.000 km = 0.621 mi: Concurrency terminus; Incomplete access

== Related routes ==
- U.S. Route 51
