= List of U.S. Highways in Wisconsin =

United States Numbered Highways of the Wisconsin State Trunk Highway System
- Highway markers used in Wisconsin

System information
- Formed: November 11, 1926

Highway names
- US Highways: US Highway nn (US nn)
- Special Routes: Alternate US Highway nn (Alt. US nn); Business US Highway nn (Bus. US nn); Bypass US Highway nn (Byp. US nn); Truck US Highway nn (Truck US nn);

System links
- Wisconsin State Trunk Highway System; Interstate; US; State; Scenic; Rustic

US Highways in Wisconsin are 14 current and 3 former United States Numbered Highways in Wisconsin.

== Mainline highways ==
Number	Length (mi)	Length (km)	Southern or western terminus	Northern or eastern terminus	Formed	Removed	Notes
US 2	104.49	168.16	US 2 in Superior	US 2 in Hurley	1926	current	Western segment
US 2	14.46	23.27	US 2/US 141 near Florence	US 2/US 141 near Spread Eagle	1926	current	Eastern segment, concurrent with US 141
US 8	255.55	411.27	US 8 in St. Croix Falls	US 8 at Norway, MI	1926	current	
US 10	294.01	473.16	US 10 in Prescott	SS Badger at Manitowoc	1926	current	Connects to US 10 in Michigan via car ferry
US 12	339.40	546.21	I-94/US 12 in Hudson	US 12 in Genoa City	1926	current	
US 14	198.49	319.44	US 14/US 61/MN 16 in La Crosse	US 14 in Walworth	1926	current	
US 16	212.2	341.5	US 14/US 16/US 61 in La Crosse	SS Milwaukee Clipper at Milwaukee	1926	1979	Connected to US 16 in Michigan via car ferry. Replaced by WIS 16, I-90, and I-94.
US 18	182.16	293.16	US 18 in Prairie du Chien	Lincoln Memorial Drive in Milwaukee	1926	current	
US 41	300	480	I-94/US 41 at Russell, IL	US 41 in Marinette	1926	current	Milwaukee–Green Bay segment upgraded to I-41
US 45	305	491	US 45 in Bristol	US 45 near Land O' Lakes	c. 1935	current	
US 51	316.51	509.37	I-39/I-90/US 51 in Beloit	US 2 in Hurley	1926	current	
US 53	239	385	US 14/US 61/WIS 16 in La Crosse	I-535/US 53 at Duluth, MN	1926	current	
US 61	120	190	US 61/US 151 in Kieler	US 14/US 61/MN 16 in La Crosse	1926	current	
US 63	182	293	US 63 in Hager City	US 2 near Benoit	1926	current	
US 110	37.4	60.2	Oshkosh	Fremont	1926	1936	Replaced by WIS 110
US 118	38.1	61.3	US 61 in Dickeyville	US 18 in Dodgeville	1926	1928	
US 141	102.87	165.55	I-43 in Bellevue, Wisconsin	US 2/US 141 at Quinnesec, MI	1926	current	Southern segment
US 141	14.46	23.27	US 2/US 141 near Spread Eagle	US 2/US 141 near Florence	1928	current	Northern segment, concurrent with US 2
US 151	337	542	US 61/US 151 in Kieler	US 10 in Manitowoc	1926	current	
Former

== Special routes ==
Except were indicated, the following highways are or were locally maintained.

Number	Length (mi)	Length (km)	Southern or western terminus	Northern or eastern terminus	Formed	Removed	Notes
Bus. US 2	—	—	—	—	—	—	Formerly served Hurley
Bus. US 8	7.1	11.4	US 8 & WIS 47 west of Rhinelander	US 8/WIS 47 east of Rhinelander	1992	2005	Section of route east of town resigned as CTH-P
Bus. US 10	—	—	—	—	—	—	Serves Neillsville
Bus. US 12	—	—	—	—	—	—	Serves Lake Delton and Baraboo
Bus. US 12	—	—	—	—	—	—	Serves Sauk Prairie
Bus. US 12	—	—	—	—	—	—	Serves Whitewater
Bus. US 12	—	—	—	—	—	—	Formerly served Eau Claire
Bus. US 14	—	—	—	—	—	—	Serves Janesville
Bus. US 16	—	—	—	—	1961	1979	Formerly served Watertown
Bus. US 18	—	—	—	—	—	—	Serves Mount Horeb
Alt. US 18	—	—	—	—	—	—	Formerly served Milwaukee
Bus. US 18	—	—	—	—	—	—	Serves Verona
Bus. US 41	—	—	—	—	—	—	Formerly served Fond du Lac
Bus. US 41	—	—	—	—	—	—	Formerly served Oshkosh
Bus. US 41	—	—	—	—	—	—	Formerly served Appleton
Bus. US 41	—	—	—	—	—	—	Serves De Pere and Ashwaubenon; state-maintained
Bus. US 41	—	—	—	—	—	—	Formerly served Green Bay
Bus. US 41	—	—	—	—	—	—	Serves Oconto
Bus. US 41	—	—	—	—	—	—	Serves Peshtigo
Bus. US 45	—	—	—	—	—	—	Serves New London
Bus. US 45	—	—	—	—	—	—	Serves Wittenberg
Bus. US 51	—	—	—	—	—	—	Formerly state-maintained and served Merrill
Bus. US 51	—	—	—	—	—	—	Serves Stevens Point and Plover; state-maintained
Bus. US 51	—	—	—	—	—	—	Serves Wausau, Schofield and Rothschild; state-maintained
Spur US 51	—	—	—	—	—	—	Unsigned in Beloit; state-maintained
Bus. US 51	—	—	—	—	—	—	Formerly served Tomahawk
Bus. US 53	—	—	—	—	—	—	Serves Eau Claire
Bus. US 53	—	—	—	—	—	—	Serves La Crosse
Bus. US 53	—	—	—	—	—	—	Serves Solon Springs
Bus. US 53	—	—	—	—	—	—	Serves Minong
Bus. US 53	—	—	—	—	—	—	Serves Superior
Byp. US 53	—	—	—	—	2005	2006	Temporary designation used at Eau Claire
Bus. US 141	—	—	—	—	—	—	Formerly served Manitowoc
Bus. US 141	4.5	7.2	US 141 southwest of Coleman	US 141 and WIS 64 northeast of Pound	2006	current	Follows old alignment through Coleman and Pound
Bus. US 141	—	—	—	—	—	—	Formerly served Sheboygan
Bus. US 151	—	—	—	—	—	—	Serves Platteville
Bus. US 151	—	—	—	—	—	—	Serves Mineral Point
Bus. US 151	—	—	—	—	—	—	Serves Mount Horeb; cosigned with Bus. US 18
Bus. US 151	—	—	—	—	—	—	Serves Verona; cosigned with Bus. US 18
Bus. US 151	—	—	—	—	—	—	Serves Sun Prairie
Bus. US 151	—	—	—	—	—	—	Serves Columbus
Bus. US 151	—	—	—	—	—	—	Serves Beaver Dam
Bus. US 151	—	—	—	—	—	—	Serves Waupun
Former
