= Iowa Highway 94 =

Former state highway in Iowa, United States

Iowa Highway 94
- Iowa 94 highlighted in red and royal blue

Route information
- Maintained by Iowa DOT
- Length: 10.696 mi (17.214 km)
- Existed: 1966–2003

Major junctions
- South end: US 151 Bus. in Cedar Rapids
- North end: CR E36 near Palo

Location
- Country: United States
- State: Iowa
- County: Linn

Highway system
- Iowa Primary Highway System; Interstate; US; State; Secondary; Scenic
← Iowa 93	→ Iowa 96

Iowa Highway 94 (Iowa 94) was a former state highway in Linn County, Iowa. It began in downtown Cedar Rapids at 1st Avenue near Interstate 380 and ended at County Road E36 near Palo, Iowa.

== Route description ==
Iowa 94 began at U.S. Route 151 Business in Cedar Rapids. Due to the proximity of the Cedar River and that the southernmost one-half mile (800 m) of the highway was on one-way streets, the northbound lanes began on the western bank of the river while the southbound lanes ended on the eastern bank. The two directions crossed at the corner of 1st Street NW and E Avenue NW. They joined a few blocks to the west, at the corner of F Avenue NW and Ellis Boulevard NW and stayed together for the remainder of the route.

Traveling along F Avenue NW, the highway headed west until it reached Wiley Boulevard NW. From there until its end, it headed northwest. Once it exited the Cedar Rapids city limits, the highway was known as Covington Road. It intersected County Road E44 (CR E44) near the unincorporated village of Covington. The highway continued northwest to Palo. It intersected CR W36 on the southern end of town. Iowa 94 ended at a T-intersection with CR E36 on the western edge of Palo. CR E36 formed the western and northern legs of the intersection while Iowa 94 was the eastern leg.

== History ==
There were two routes designated as Iowa Highway 94. The first, also located in Linn County, existed from 1920 through November 1958. The western terminus for this first highway was Iowa 28, which later became U.S. Highway 151 near Marion, Iowa. The eastern terminus was at what today is known as U.S. Highway 30 near Mount Vernon, Iowa.

The second Iowa 94 existed from 1966 until it was turned back on July 1, 2003. It was a renumbering of Iowa 74 because of I-74. The portions of the route within Cedar Rapids were turned over to the city, and were identified by their city street names. The rural portion of the route was turned over to Linn County, who today maintain the route as County Road W36.

== Major intersections ==
The entire route was in Linn County.

Location	mi	km	Destinations	Notes
Cedar Rapids	0.000	0.000	US 151 Bus. (1st Avenue NW)	Begin one-way segment
Cedar Rapids	0.149	0.240	Iowa 94 south (E Avenue)	
Cedar Rapids	0.472	0.760	Ellis Boulevard	End one-way segment
Covington	5.016	8.072	CR E44 (Ellis Road)	
Palo	10.416	16.763	CR E36 (Blairs Ferry Road, Shellsburg Road)	
1.000 mi = 1.609 km; 1.000 km = 0.621 mi
