= Special routes of U.S. Route 151 =

Bannered routes of U.S. Route 151

Special routes of U.S. Highway 151

Highway system
- United States Numbered Highway System; List; Special; Divided; Wisconsin State Trunk Highway System; Interstate; US; State; Scenic; Rustic

Twelve special routes of U.S. Highway 151 (US 151) exist. Three of which are located in Iowa and the other nine are in Wisconsin.

== Cedar Rapids business loop ==
U.S. Highway 151 Business
- Location: Cedar Rapids, Iowa; Marion, Iowa
- Existed: July 1989–present

U.S. Highway 151 Business (US 151 Business) is designated mostly along the former alignment of US 151 through Cedar Rapids and Marion, Iowa. US 151 Business begins at exit 248, the intersection of US 30 / US 218 and US 151 in Cedar Rapids. US 151 Business follows Williams Boulevard northeast to 1st Avenue, which it follows for the rest of its path through Cedar Rapids. 1st Avenue becomes Marion Boulevard in southwest Marion. Marion Boulevard becomes 7th Avenue before US 151 Business moves a block south to 6th Avenue as it goes through downtown Marion. US 151 Business returns to follow 7th Avenue at 27th Street and continues to its northern terminus, the intersection of US 151 and Iowa Highway 13 (Iowa 13).

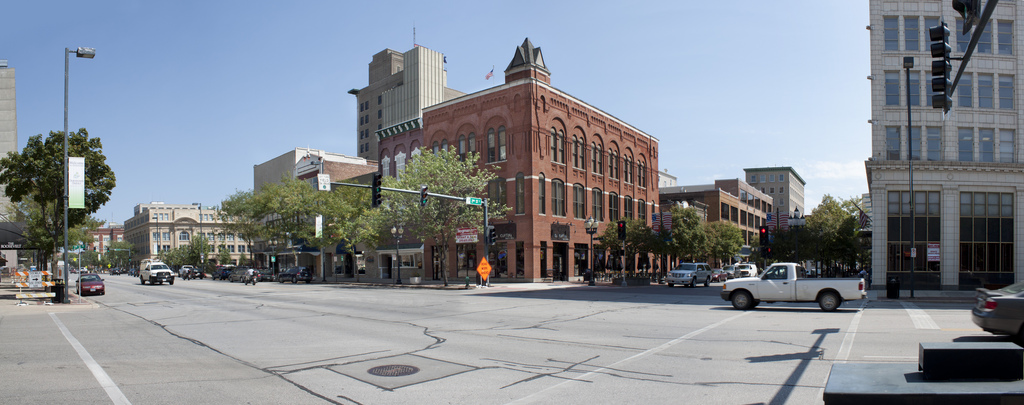
US 151 Bus. runs along 1st Avenue in downtown Cedar Rapids

Through Cedar Rapids, US 151 Business is officially designated as Iowa 922, though it is never signed as such.

The entire route is in Linn County.

Location	mi	km	Destinations	Notes
Cedar Rapids	0.000	0.000	US 30 / US 151 south / US 218 – Amana Colonies, Mount Vernon, Tama	Southern end of US 151 Business / Iowa 922
Cedar Rapids	2.072	3.335	16th Avenue SW	
Cedar Rapids	2.908	4.680	1st Avenue W / 18th Street SW	US 151 Business merges onto 1st Avenue W
Cedar Rapids	4.023	6.474	I-380 / Iowa 27 (Exit 19)	
Cedar Rapids	4.209	6.774	1st Street NW	Former Iowa 94 northbound
Cedar Rapids	4.402	7.084	1st Street NE	Former Iowa 94 southbound
Cedar Rapids	8.862	14.262	Iowa 100 (Collins Road)	End of Iowa 922
Marion	12.7	20.4	US 151 north / Iowa 13 to US 30 – Springville, Central City	Northern end of US 151 Bus.
1.000 mi = 1.609 km; 1.000 km = 0.621 mi

Browse numbered routes
← Iowa 438	IA 922	→ Iowa 926

== Monticello business loop ==
U.S. Highway 151 Business
- Location: Monticello, Iowa
- Length: 4.1 mi (6.6 km)
- Existed: 2004–present

U.S. Highway 151 Business (US 151 Business) in Monticello was created in 2004 when US 151 was expanded and rerouted around Monticello. US 151 Business in Monticello begins at exit 68 of US 151. It is co-signed with Jones County Route X44 until the Monticello city limits. In Monticello, US 151 Business follows Main Street. Between Oak Street and 1st Street, Iowa 38 overlaps US 151 Business. The northern terminus of US 151 Business is an at-grade intersection with US 151.

The entire route is in Jones County.

Location	mi	km	Destinations	Notes
Monticello	0.0	0.0	US 151	
Monticello	1.9	3.1	Iowa 38 south (Oak Street) – Airport, Olin, Camp Courageous	Southern end of Iowa 38 overlap
Monticello	2.2	3.5	Iowa 38 north (1st Street)	Northern end of Iowa 38 overlap
Lovell Township	4.1	6.6	US 151 – Dubuque, Cedar Rapids	
1.000 mi = 1.609 km; 1.000 km = 0.621 mi

== Cascade business loop ==
U.S. Highway 151 Business
- Location: Cascade, Iowa
- Length: 3.0 mi (4.8 km)

U.S. Highway 151 Business (US 151 Business) is a business route of US 151 in Cascade, Iowa that is 3.0 miles (4.8 km) long. It starts west of Cascade at a junction with US 151. Within the city, the highway is known mostly as 1st Avenue and intersects with Iowa 136. Shortly before its eastern terminus, the route turns onto Fox Street.

County	Location	mi	km	Destinations	Notes
Jones	Richland Township	0.0	0.0	US 151	
Dubuque	Cascade	1.4	2.3	Iowa 136 (Johnson Street) to US 151	
Dubuque	Whitewater Township	3.0	4.8	US 151 – Farley, Cedar Rapids, Dubuque	
1.000 mi = 1.609 km; 1.000 km = 0.621 mi

== Platteville business loop ==
Business U.S. Highway 151
- Location: Platteville, Wisconsin
- Length: 3.6 mi (5.8 km)

Business U.S. Highway 151 (Bus. US 151) is a business route of US 151 in Platteville, Wisconsin that is 3.6 miles (5.8 km) long. The first portion of the highway is shared by County Trunk Highway D. In downtown Platteville, the highway intersects with Wisconsin Highway 80. It is known as Dubuque Road for most of its length.

The entire route is in Grant County.

Location	mi	km	Destinations	Notes
Town of Platteville	0.0	0.0	US 151 / CTH-D south – Dubuque, Madison	South end of CTH-D overlap
Platteville	0.7	1.1	CTH-D north	North end of CTH-D overlap
Platteville	1.3	2.1	WIS 80 (Water Street) / WIS 81	Access to University of Wisconsin–Platteville, Platteville Municipal Airport, and Southwest Health Center
Platteville	3.6	5.8	US 151 / CTH-XX begins – Dubuque, Madison	Northern terminus; roadway continues as CTH-XX
1.000 mi = 1.609 km; 1.000 km = 0.621 mi

== Mineral Point business loop ==
Business U.S. Highway 151
- Location: Mineral Point, Wisconsin
- Length: 3.7 mi (6.0 km)

Business U.S. Highway 151 (Bus. US 151) is a business route of US 151 in Mineral Point, Wisconsin that is 3.7 miles (6.0 km) long. When it starts at US 151 outside of Mineral Point, it is concurrent with County Trunk Highway O. The concurrency is very short, and ends just after it starts. Inside Mineral Point, the route becomes concurrent with Wisconsin Highway 39. After this concurrency ends, it becomes concurrent with Wisconsin Highway 23. It then heads towards US 151 and ends there, intersecting County Trunk Highway YD along the way.

=== Major intersections ===
The entire route is in Iowa County.

Location	mi	km	Destinations	Notes
Town of Mineral Point	0.0	0.0	US 151 – Platteville, Dodgeville	Southern terminus and southern end of concurrency with County Trunk Highway O
Town of Mineral Point	0.3	0.48	CTH-O south	Northern end of concurrency with CTH O
Mineral Point	1.2	1.9	WIS 39 west – Linden, Iowa County Airport	Southern end of concurrency with WIS 39
Mineral Point	2	3.2	WIS 39 east / WIS 23 south – Darlington, Hollandale	Northern end of concurrency with WIS 39 and southern end of concurrency with WIS 23
Mineral Point	3.1	5.0	CTH-YD east (Business Park Road)	
Town of Mineral Point	3.7	6.0	US 151 / WIS 23 north – Platteville, Dodgeville	Northern terminus and northern end of concurrency with WIS 23
1.000 mi = 1.609 km; 1.000 km = 0.621 mi: Concurrency terminus

== Mount Horeb business loop ==
Business U.S. Highway 151
- Location: Mount Horeb, Wisconsin
- Length: 3.4 mi (5.5 km)

Business U.S. Highway 151 (Bus. US 151) is a former segment of US 18/151 between Exits 65 and 69 within Mount Horeb. The route is also shared by US 18 Business, as well as parts of Wisconsin Highway 78 and Dane County Road ID.

The entire route is in Mount Horeb, Dane County.

mi	km	Destinations	Notes
0.0	0.0	US 18 / US 151 / WIS 78 south – Dodgeville, Madison Bus. US 18 begins	South end of Bus. US 18 and WIS 78 overlap
0.1	0.16	CTH-ID west	South end of CTH-ID overlap
1.7	2.7	WIS 78 north (8th Street)	North end of WIS 78 overlap
3.4	5.5	US 18 / US 151 – Dodgeville, Madison Bus. US 18 ends / CTH-ID ends	North end of Bus. US 18 and CTH-ID overlap
1.000 mi = 1.609 km; 1.000 km = 0.621 mi: Concurrency terminus

== Verona business loop ==
Business U.S. Highway 151
- Location: Verona, Wisconsin
- Length: 2.7 mi (4.3 km)

Business U.S. Highway 151 (Bus. US 151) is a former segment of US 18/151 within Verona. The route is also shared by US 18 Business and Dane County Road MV. US 18 Business/151 Business/CR MV begins at a pair of flyover interchanges with US 18/151 on Exit 76 west of Verona. Eastbound Exit 76 runs directly into the business routes on West Verona Avenue, while westbound Exit 76 connects to the business routes by way of Epic Lane. From there, the business routes run east-northeast as a four-lane divided highway until the intersection with Legion Street, where it becomes a local two-lane undivided road. At the intersection with North and South Main Streets (Dane County Road M), West Verona Avenue becomes East Verona Avenue, making a brief reverse curve to the left before returning to its previous trajectory at School Street and becoming a four-lane divided highway east of there. US BUS 18/151/CR MV ends east of Verona at Exit 81 on US 18/151, but only with an eastbound on-ramp and westbound off-ramp.

The entire route is in Verona, Dane County.

mi	km	Destinations	Notes
0.0	0.0	US 18 / US 151 Bus. US 18 begins	South end of Bus. US 18 overlap
1.3	2.1	CTH-M (Main Street)	
2.4	3.9	US 18 / US 151 Bus. US 18 ends	North end of Bus. US 18 overlap
1.000 mi = 1.609 km; 1.000 km = 0.621 mi: Concurrency terminus

== Dane County alternate route ==
Alternate U.S. Highway 151
- Location: Dane County, Wisconsin

Alternate U.S. Highway 151 (Alt. US 151) is a permanently signed detour route that begins in Verona. The route follows CTH-PB, CTH-M, and CTH-MM to connect with US 14 north of Oregon, then uses US 14 to reconnect with the main route in Madison. The route is concurrent with Alt. US 18.

The entire route is in Dane County.

Location	mi	km	Exit	Destinations	Notes
Verona	0.0	0.0		US 18 / US 151 – Madison, Mount Horeb Alt. US 18 begins	South end of Alt. US 18 overlap
Verona	0.2	0.32		CTH-M west	South end of CTH-M overlap
Fitchburg	7.3	11.7		CTH-M ends / CTH-MM south	North end of CTH-M overlap; south end of CTH-MM overlap
Fitchburg	7.6	12.2		US 14 east / CTH-MM north – Evansville	North end of CTH-MM overlap; south end of US 14 overlap
Fitchburg	11.3	18.2	134	To CTH-MM / Lacy Road	To CTH-MM only signed northbound
Fitchburg	12.6	20.3	133	To CTH-MM / Mc Coy Road	Southbound exit northbound entrance
Madison	13.4	21.6	132	US 12 / US 18 / US 151 / US 14 west Alt. US 18 ends	North end of US 14 and Alt. US 18 overlap; access to SSM Health Saint Mary's Hospital - Madison
1.000 mi = 1.609 km; 1.000 km = 0.621 mi: Concurrency terminus; Incomplete access

== Sun Prairie business loop ==
Business U.S. Highway 151
- Location: Sun Prairie, Wisconsin
- Length: 2.9 mi (4.7 km)

Business U.S. Highway 151 (Bus. US 151) is a business route of US 151 in Sun Prairie, Wisconsin that is 2.9 miles (4.7 km) long. Formerly the mainline of US 151, it passes through downtown and connects two exits on the freeway portion of US 151. Part of the route is shared with Wisconsin Highway 19.

The entire route is in Sun Prairie, Dane County.

mi	km	Destinations	Notes
0.0	0.0	US 151 – Columbus, Madison	
1.9	3.1	WIS 19 east / CTH-N south	South end of WIS 19 and CTH-N overlap
2.2	3.5	WIS 19 west	North end of WIS 19 overlap
2.9	4.7	US 151 / CTH-N north – Columbus, Madison	North end of CTH-N overlap
1.000 mi = 1.609 km; 1.000 km = 0.621 mi: Concurrency terminus

== Columbus business loop ==
Business U.S. Highway 151
- Location: Columbus, Wisconsin
- Length: 3.8 mi (6.1 km)

Business U.S. Highway 151 (Bus. US 151) is a business route of US 151 in Columbus, Wisconsin that is 3.8 miles (6.1 km) long. Formerly the mainline of US 151, it passes through downtown and connects two exits on the freeway portion of US 151. Wisconsin Highway 73 overlaps the entire route.

County	Location	mi	km	Destinations	Notes
Columbia	Town of Columbus	0.0	0.0	US 151 / WIS 73 south – Beaver Dam, Madison	South end of WIS 73 overlap
Columbia	Columbus	1.7	2.7	WIS 89 south	Northern terminus of WIS 89
Columbia	Columbus	2.1	3.4	WIS 16 (James Street) / WIS 60	
Dodge		3.8	6.1	US 151 / WIS 73 north – Sun Prairie, Randolph, Beaver Dam	North end of WIS 73 overlap
1.000 mi = 1.609 km; 1.000 km = 0.621 mi: Concurrency terminus

== Beaver Dam business loop ==
Business U.S. Highway 151
- Location: Beaver Dam, Wisconsin
- Length: 4.6 mi (7.4 km)

Business U.S. Highway 151 (Bus. US 151) is a business route of US 151 in Beaver Dam, Wisconsin that is 4.6 miles (7.4 km) long. Formerly the mainline of US 151, it passes through downtown and connects two exits on the freeway portion of US 151. Part of the route is shared with Wisconsin Highway 33.

The entire route is in Dodge County.

Location	mi	km	Destinations	Notes
Beaver Dam	0.0	0.0	US 151 / CTH-D ends – Madison, Fond du Lac	Eastern terminus of CTH-D
Town of Beaver Dam	0.6	0.97	CTH-D west	North end of CTH-D overlap
Beaver Dam	2.0	3.2	WIS 33 west	South end of WIS 33 overlap
Beaver Dam	2.1	3.4	WIS 33 east	Northern end of WIS 33 overlap
Beaver Dam	4.6	7.4	US 151 / CTH-B – Waupun, Fond du Lac	
1.000 mi = 1.609 km; 1.000 km = 0.621 mi: Concurrency terminus

== Waupun business loop ==
Business U.S. Highway 151
- Location: Waupun, Wisconsin
- Length: 5.1 mi (8.2 km)

Business U.S. Highway 151 (Bus. US 151) is a business route of US 151 in Waupun, Wisconsin that is 5.1 miles (8.2 km) long. Formerly the mainline of US 151, it passes through downtown and connects two exits on the freeway portion of US 151. Parts of the route is shared with Wisconsin Highways 49 and 26.

County	Location	mi	km	Destinations	Notes
Dodge	Chester	0.0	0.0	US 151 south / CTH-M ends	South end of CTH-M
Dodge	Waupun	3.7	6.0	WIS 49 north / CTH-M north to WIS 68	North end of CTH-M overlap; south end of WIS 49 overlap
Fond du Lac	Waupun	3.8	6.1	WIS 49 south	North end of WIS 49 overlap
Fond du Lac	Waupun	4.0	6.4	WIS 26 south	South end of WIS 26 overlap
Fond du Lac	Town of Waupun	4.7	7.6	US 151 north / WIS 26 north / Oak Center Road – Rosendale, Fond du Lac	Northbound exit, southbound entrance; northbound only exit to Oak Center Road; north end of WIS 26 overlap
1.000 mi = 1.609 km; 1.000 km = 0.621 mi: Concurrency terminus; Incomplete access
