= Eagle Point Bridge =

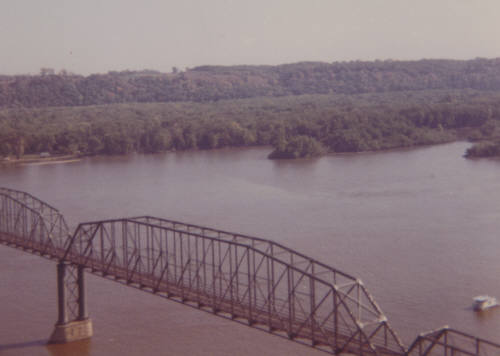
- The former Eagle Point Bridge
- Coordinates: 42°32′13″N 90°38′38″W
- Carries: 2 lanes of US 61 / US 151
- Crosses: Mississippi River
- Locale: Dubuque, Iowa, and Grant County, Wisconsin
- Maintained by: State of Iowa

Characteristics
- Design: Truss bridge

History
- Opened: 1902
- Closed: 1983

The Eagle Point Bridge was a very narrow two-lane automobile bridge that connected urban Dubuque, Iowa, and rural Grant County, Wisconsin. It was part of the US 61/US 151 route, and was a toll bridge. After the new Dubuque–Wisconsin Bridge was built in 1983, the Eagle Point Bridge was torn down. At the end, the toll was ten cents, both ways, collected on the Iowa side.

The bridge was located about 900 feet (270 m) south of Lock and Dam No. 11, at the northern edge of Rhomberg Avenue in Dubuque, and connected to Eagle Point Road on the opposite side of the river. It was about one mile (1.6 km) north of the present bridge. In 1968, the highway designation was removed from the bridge and a four-ton load limit was put in place. The bridge was still structurally sound after the new bridge was built, leading some to ask the bridge be kept open as a pedestrian or special use bridge, but the state of Iowa still tore the bridge down.

Several years after the demolition of the bridge, a restaurant known as the Tollbridge Inn was constructed at what was the Iowa end of the bridge. The restaurant operated for a number of years, until it was torn down to make way for future development.

The bridge was extensively documented in 1982 for the Historic American Engineering Record, archived at the Library of Congress. The documentation includes 81 black-and-white photos and 39 data pages detailing construction and history of the bridge.

Eagle Point Bridge
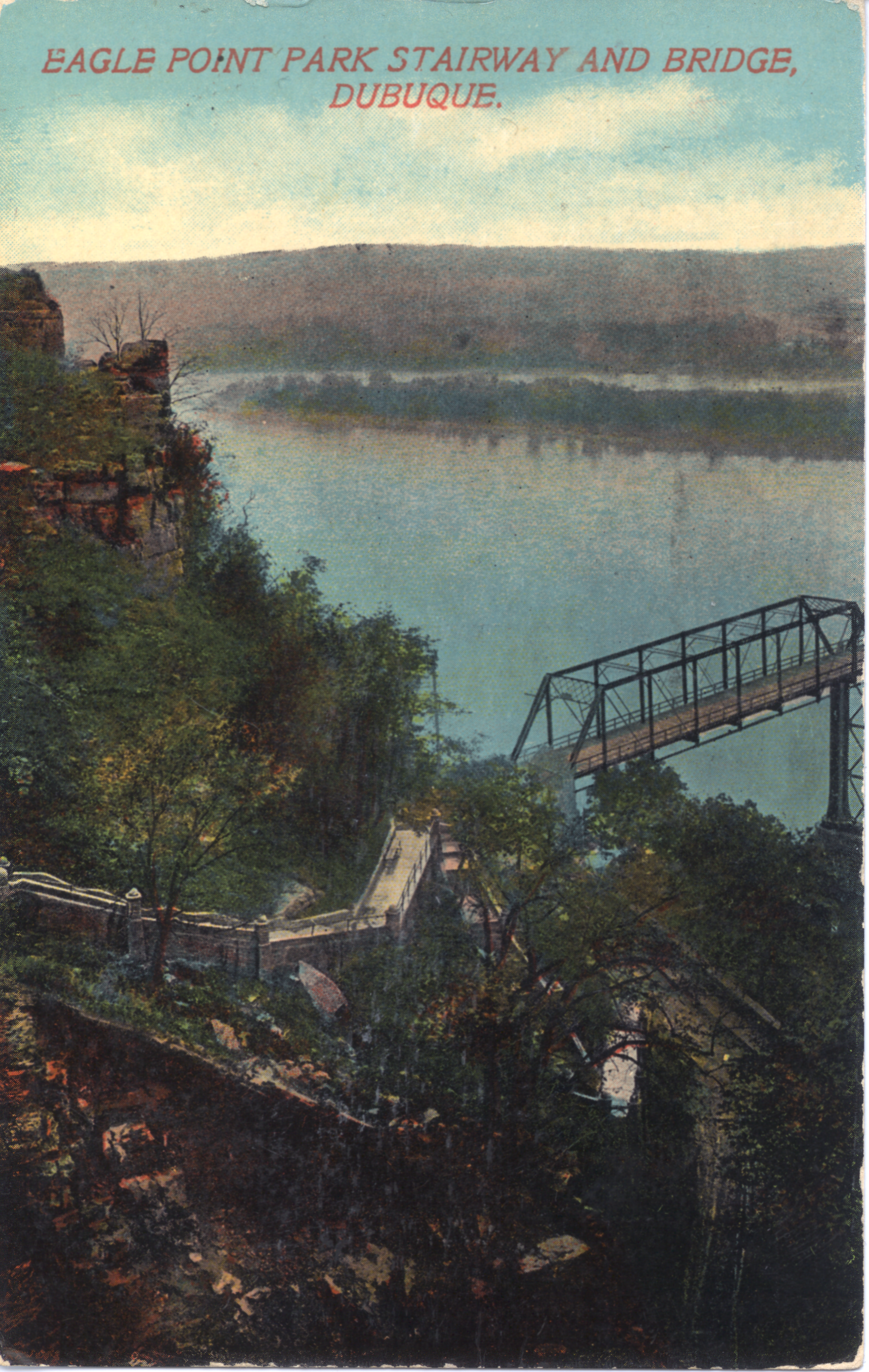
Postcard titled "Eagle Point Park Stairway And Bridge Dubuque" with May 21, 1912 postmark on reverse.

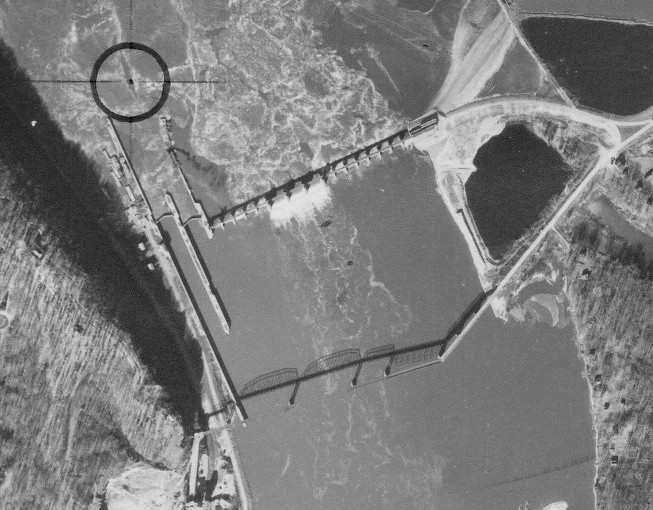
An aerial view of Lock and Dam 11 with the Eagle Point Bridge, November 1940

== See also ==
- List of crossings of the Upper Mississippi River
- List of bridges documented by the Historic American Engineering Record in Iowa
- List of bridges documented by the Historic American Engineering Record in Wisconsin
