= Dubuque–Wisconsin Bridge =

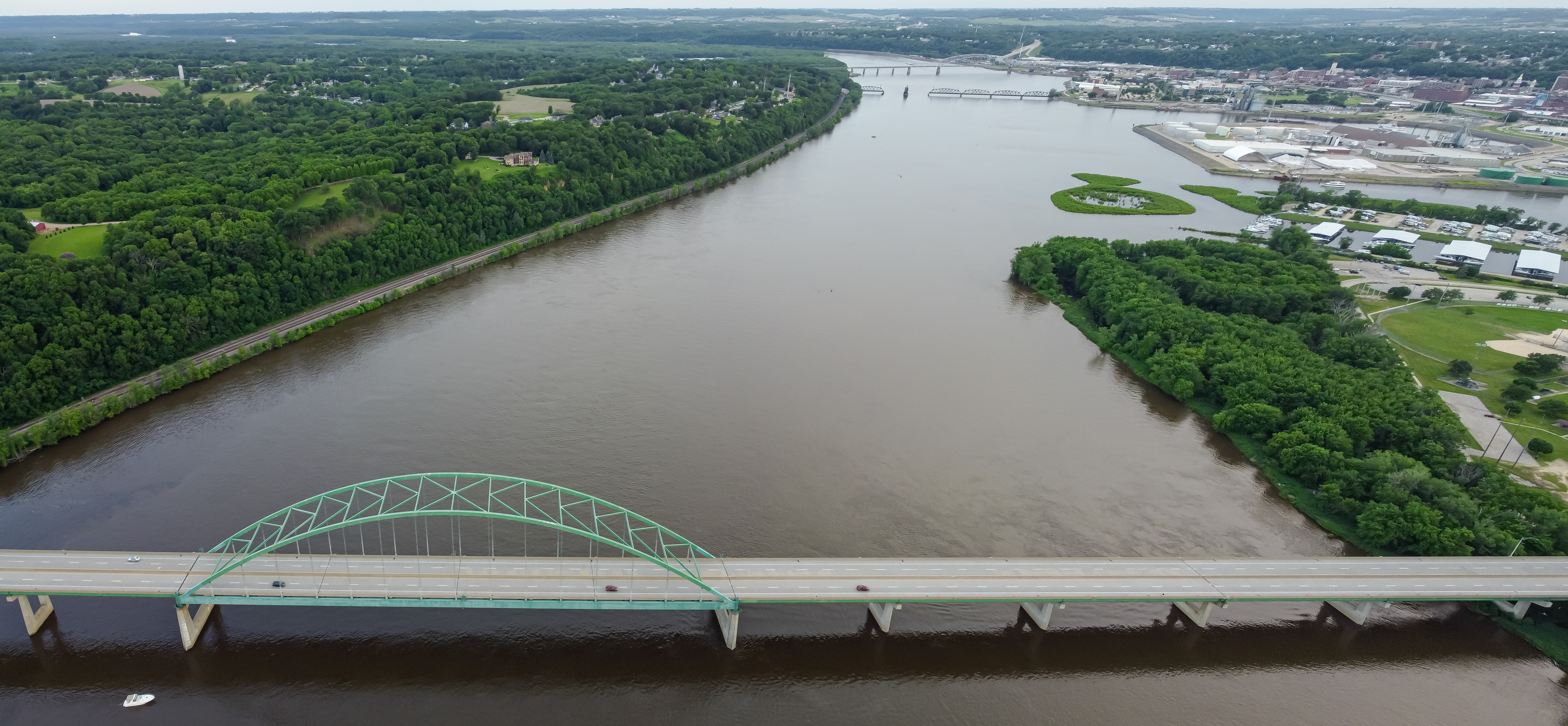
- Coordinates: 42°30′56″N 90°38′08″W
- Carries: 4 lanes of US 61 / US 151
- Crosses: Mississippi River
- Locale: Dubuque, Iowa, with Grant County, Wisconsin
- Maintained by: Wisconsin Department of Transportation

Characteristics
- Design: Tied arch bridge
- Total length: 2,951 feet (899 m)
- Longest span: 670 feet (204 m)
- Clearance below: 65 feet (20 m)

History
- Opened: August 21, 1982

The Dubuque–Wisconsin Bridge is a steel Tied-arch automobile bridge connecting Dubuque, Iowa, with still largely rural Grant County, Wisconsin, over the Mississippi River. It is one of two automobile bridges in the Dubuque area, the other being the Julien Dubuque Bridge, which is located about three miles (4.8 km) south.

The bridge is a four lane, limited access bridge and is part of US Highway 61/US Highway 151 (US 61/US 151). This bridge replaced the older Eagle Point Bridge that previously served as the connection between Dubuque and Wisconsin.

== History ==
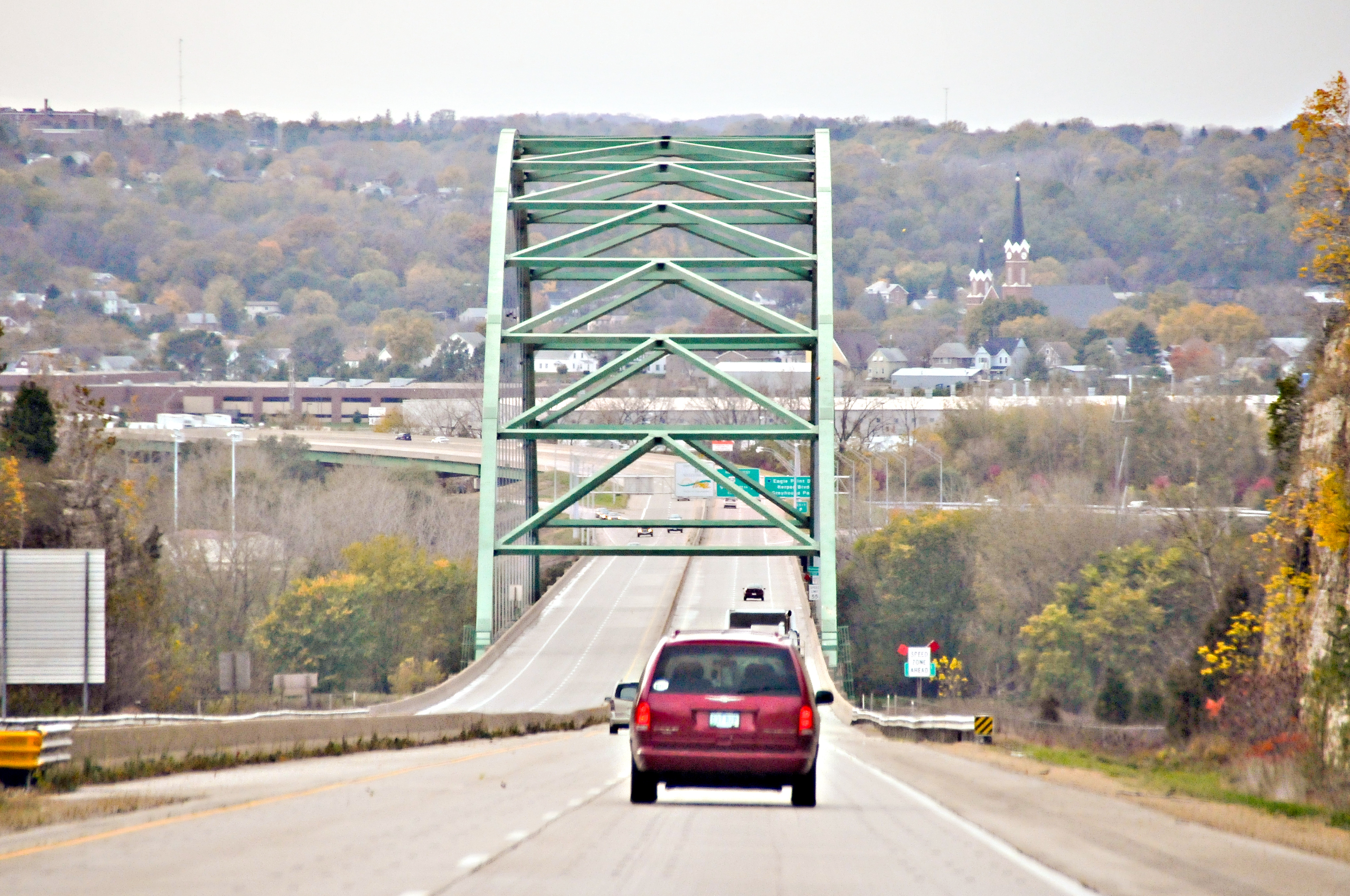
Dubuque–Wisconsin Bridge heading from Wisconsin to Iowa

In the late 1970s and the early 1980s, city officials became convinced that the Eagle Point Bridge was no longer adequate for the city's needs. They determined that a four lane bridge would be needed for the increasing traffic that was anticipated.

Several names for the bridge were considered for the new bridge. Included among the names suggested was one that honored the pioneer priest Samuel Charles Mazzuchelli.

When the Dubuque–Wisconsin Bridge opened in 1981, it ended on an island in the river called City Island, formerly known as Ham's Island (as Mathias Ham once owned the land). From City Island, a new bridge was constructed over the Peosta Channel of the Mississippi River, along an alignment that connected with East 16th Street. City Island has since been named Chaplain Schmitt Memorial Island in honor of Father Aloysius Schmitt, who was killed in the Japanese attack on Pearl Harbor on December 7, 1941.

In the late 1980s, a riverfront expressway for US 61 and US 151 was funded. This nearly mile-long curving bridge was designed to fill in the gap between the Dubuque–Wisconsin Bridge and the new waterfront expressway. The bridge crosses the Peosta Channel of the Mississippi River, as well as a backwater pond. Despite crossing two bodies of water, only 5 of the 20 spans of the bridge are over water.

Upon completion in 1983, traffic was shifted over from the Eagle Point Bridge to the new bridge. The Eagle Point Bridge was demolished soon afterward.

In the early 1990s, the approach to the bridge was rebuilt to accommodate the new four lane US 61/US 151 highway being built in Dubuque.

During the rebuilding of the Julien Dubuque Bridge, traffic from US 20 was detoured on to this bridge.

In 2003, the deck of the bridge was rebuilt and the bridge cleaned.

== See also ==
- List of crossings of the Upper Mississippi River
