= Business routes of U.S. Route 41 in Wisconsin =

Business U.S. Highway 41

Location
- Country: United States
- State: Wisconsin

Highway system
- United States Numbered Highway System; List; Special; Divided; Wisconsin State Trunk Highway System; Interstate; US; State; Scenic; Rustic

A total of three business routes of U.S. Route 41 exist in Wisconsin. Additionally, there were four business routes that have since been disestablished. Business routes typically run through cities, after a highway was realigned. None are official state highways according to the Wisconsin Department of Transportation (WisDOT) and are thus locally maintained, with the exception of the route through De Pere and Ashwaubenon.

== Appleton ==
Business U.S. Highway 41
- Location: Appleton, Wisconsin
- Existed: 1999
- History: Signed as City US 41 before 1963

Business U.S. Highway 41 (Bus. US 41) was a business loop in Appleton. The route was decommissioned in 1999.

== De Pere ==
Business Highway 41 in De Pere follows the old alignment of US 41. It is only two thirds of a mile long, extending until Ashwaubenon. This route was designated and is maintained by the WisDOT.

== Fond du Lac ==
Business U.S. Highway 41
- Location: Fond du Lac, Wisconsin
- Existed: 1952–1980
- History: Signed as City US 41 before 1963

Business U.S. Highway 41 (Bus. US 41) was a business loop in Fond du Lac. It was formed as City U.S. Highway 41 in 1952, using the former route of US 41 when an expressway bypass of Fond du Lac was completed. The route was decommissioned in 1980.

== Green Bay ==
Business U.S. Highway 41
- Location: Green Bay, Wisconsin
- Existed: 1969–1998

Business U.S. Highway 41 (Bus. US 41) was a business loop in Green Bay. It was formed in 1969, using the former route of US 41 when an expressway bypass of Green Bay was completed. The route was temporarily designated as Wisconsin Highway 119 from 1968 to 1969. In 1975, a freeway bypass of the Ashwaubenon–De Pere area was completed, and Business 41 was extended on the former route of US 41. In 1998, most of the route was retired, except for a freeway spur into Ashwaubenon–De Pere.

== Oconto ==
Business Highway 41 in Oconto follows the former alignment of US 41.

== Oshkosh ==
Business U.S. Highway 41
- Location: Oshkosh, Wisconsin
- Existed: 1952–1980
- History: Signed as City US 41 before 1963

Business U.S. Highway 41 (Bus. US 41) was a business loop in Oshkosh. It was formed as City U.S. Highway 41 in 1952, using the former route of US 41 when an expressway bypass of Oshkosh was completed. The route was decommissioned in 1980.

== Peshtigo ==
Business Highway 41 in Peshtigo follows the former alignment of US 41.

== See also ==
- U.S. Route 141 § Business routes
