= Iowa Highway 122 =

State highway in Iowa, United States

Iowa Highway 122
- Iowa 122 highlighted in red

Route information
- Maintained by Iowa DOT
- Length: 12.264 mi (19.737 km)
- Existed: December 6, 1999–present

Major junctions
- West end: I-35 / US 18 / Iowa 27 in Clear Lake
- US 65 in Mason City
- East end: CR B30 at the east city limit of Mason City

Location
- Country: United States
- State: Iowa
- Counties: Cerro Gordo

Highway system
- Iowa Primary Highway System; Interstate; US; State; Secondary; Scenic
← Iowa 117	→ Iowa 127

Iowa Highway 122 (Iowa 122) is an east–west route in Cerro Gordo County which connects the county's two largest cities, Clear Lake and Mason City. The length of the highway is 12 miles (19 km). Much of the route is constructed as a four-lane expressway with at-grade intersections. It was designated in 1999 after US 18 was rerouted onto a four-lane bypass around Mason City.

== Route description ==
Iowa 122 begins at a diamond interchange with Interstate 35 on the eastern edge of Clear Lake. The route, overlapped by U.S. Highway 18 Business, begins as a four-lane divided highway, serving the Mason City Municipal Airport before entering Mason City proper. Between Eisenhower and Jefferson Avenues in Mason City the highway is undivided. This road is the primary east–west artery through Mason City.

At Jefferson Avenue, Iowa 122 separates into a pair of one-way streets, remaining in this configuration through the downtown area where the Park Inn Hotel, one of Frank Lloyd Wright's few commercial buildings, resides. Iowa 122 intersects U.S. Highway 65 at Federal Avenue. US 18 Business turns to the south to follow US 65. The one-way streets rejoin at Massachusetts Avenue forming an undivided four-lane road. The Iowa 122 designation ends at the eastern city limits of Mason City, just beyond North Iowa Area Community College.

== History ==
Prior to December 1999, the road currently designated as Iowa 122 was a segment of U.S. Highway 18. In that year, the state completed work on a new freeway segment of US 18, bypassing Mason City to the south. This bypass was part of the Avenue of the Saints project. The bypassed segment of US 18 was designated as Iowa Highway 122.

Iowa 122 originally incorporated all of the bypassed segment of US 18. Its original eastern end was at Rudd, at the junction with Floyd County Road T26. In 2000, a new segment of Iowa 122 opened east of Rudd, connecting 122 with 18 directly. In 2001, the segment between Nora Springs and Rudd was turned over to Floyd County. In 2003, the segment between Mason City and Nora Springs was turned over to Cerro Gordo County.

== Major intersections ==
The entire route is in Cerro Gordo County.

Location	mi	km	Destinations	Notes
Clear Lake	0.000	0.000	I-35 / US 18 / US 18 Bus. begins / Iowa 27 – Des Moines, Minneapolis	Western end of US 18 Business overlap
Mason City	7.862	12.653	US 65 / US 18 Bus. east (Federal Way)	Eastern end of US 18 Business overlap
Mason City	12.264	19.737	CR B30 east – Nora Springs	Iowa 122 ends at the eastern city limits of Mason City
1.000 mi = 1.609 km; 1.000 km = 0.621 mi
