= Special routes of U.S. Route 18 =

Special routes of U.S. Route 18

Highway system
- United States Numbered Highway System; List; Special; Divided

At least eight special routes of U.S. Route 18 (US 18) have existed.

== Hot Springs bypass route ==
U.S. Highway 18 Bypass
- Location: Hot Springs, South Dakota
- Length: 1.83 mi (2.95 km)

U.S. Highway 18 Bypass (US 18 Byp.) is a bypass around the Hot Springs, South Dakota, city center. It begins on the west side of Hot Springs at an intersection with US 18 and travels in a southeasterly direction. The highway skirts the western and southern edges of the city and meets South Dakota Highway 71 close to the point where the route turns east. It ends at US 18/US 385 in the southeastern corner of the city.

== Hot Springs truck route ==
U.S. Highway 18 Truck
- Location: Hot Springs, South Dakota

== Mason City business loop ==
U.S. Highway 18 Business
- Location: Mason City, Iowa
- Length: 10.752 mi (17.304 km)

U.S. Highway 18 Business (US 18 Bus.) begins at a diamond interchange with Interstate 35 (I-35) on the eastern edge of Clear Lake, Iowa. The route, overlapped by Iowa Highway 122 (Iowa 122), begins as a four-lane divided highway, serving the Mason City Municipal Airport before entering Mason City proper. Between Eisenhower and Jefferson avenues in Mason City, the highway is undivided. This road is the primary east–west artery through Mason City. At Jefferson Avenue, US 18 Bus./Iowa 122 separate into a pair of one-way streets, remaining in this configuration through the downtown area where the Park Inn Hotel, one of Frank Lloyd Wright's few commercial buildings, resides. They intersect US 65 at Federal Street. US 18 Bus. turns to the south to follow US 65. The business loop rejoins its parent route south of the city limits.

Major intersections

The entire route is in Cerro Gordo County.

Location	mi	km	Destinations	Notes
Clear Lake	0.000	0.000	I-35 / US 18 / Iowa 27 – Des Moines, Minneapolis Iowa 122 begins	Western end of Iowa 122 overlap
Mason City	7.862	12.653	US 65 north (S. Federal Avenue) / Iowa 122 east (6th Street SE)	Eastern end of Iowa 122 overlap; western end of US 65 overlap
Mason City	10.752	17.304	US 18 / Iowa 27 / US 65 south – Rockwell, Clear Lake, Hampton, Charles City	Eastern end of US 65 overlap
1.000 mi = 1.609 km; 1.000 km = 0.621 mi: Concurrency terminus

== McGregor–Marquette business loop ==
U.S. Highway 18 Business
- Location: McGregor–Marquette, Iowa
- Length: 4.149 mi (6.677 km)
- Existed: 1989–2025

U.S. Highway 18 Business (US 18 Bus.) began at an intersection with US 18 west of McGregor, Iowa. The route descended into the Mississippi River valley along the northern border of Pikes Peak State Park and then turned into McGregor. Through McGregor, US 18 Bus. headed to the northeast toward the Mississippi River. Along the river, the highway was parallel to the Dakota, Minnesota and Eastern Railroad. For one mile (1.6 km), US 18 Bus. traveled a narrow strip of land between the river and the bluffs where it passed a riverboat casino. At Marquette, US 18 Bus. ended at the foot of the Marquette–Joliet Bridge, which carries US 18 to Prairie du Chien, Wisconsin.

Major intersections

The entire route is in Clayton County.

Location	mi	km	Destinations	Notes
Mendon Township	0.000	0.000	US 18 – Monona, Marquette Iowa 76 begins	Southern end of Iowa 76 overlap
Marquette	4.149	6.677	To US 18 (Marquette–Joliet Bridge) – Prairie Du Chien Iowa 76 north – Effigy Mounds	Interchange; northern end of Iowa 76 overlap
1.000 mi = 1.609 km; 1.000 km = 0.621 mi: Concurrency terminus

== Mount Horeb business loop ==
Business U.S. Highway 18
- Location: Mount Horeb, Wisconsin
- Length: 3.4 mi (5.5 km)

Business U.S. Highway 18 (Bus. US 18) is a former segment of US 18/US 151 between exits 65 and 69 within Mount Horeb, Wisconsin. The route is also shared by Bus. US 151, as well as parts of State Trunk Highway 78 (WIS 78) and County Trunk Road ID (CTH-ID).

Major intersections

The entire route is in Dane County.

Location	mi	km	Destinations	Notes
	0.0	0.0	US 18 / US 151 / WIS 78 south Bus. US 151 begins	Begin US-Bus 151 and WIS 78 overlap
	0.1	0.16	CTH-ID west	Begin CTH ID overlap
Mount Horeb	1.7	2.7	WIS 78 north	End WIS 78 overlap
Mount Horeb	3.4	5.5	US 18 / US 151 Bus. US 151 ends / CTH-ID ends	End US-Bus 151 and CTH ID overlap
1.000 mi = 1.609 km; 1.000 km = 0.621 mi

== Verona business loop ==
Business U.S. Highway 18
- Location: Verona, Wisconsin
- Length: 2.4 mi (3.9 km)

Business U.S. Highway 18 (Bus. US 18) is a former segment of US 18/US 151 within Verona, Wisconsin. The route is also shared by Bus. US 151 and CTH-MV. Bus. US 18/Bus. US 151/CTH-MV begins at a pair of flyover interchanges with US 18/US 151 on exit 76 west of Verona. Eastbound exit 76 runs directly into the business routes on West Verona Avenue, while westbound exit 76 connects to the business routes by way of Epic Lane. From there, the business routes run east-northeast as a four-lane divided highway until the intersection with Legion Street, where it becomes a local two-lane undivided road. At the intersection with North and South Main streets (CTH-M), West Verona Avenue becomes East Verona Avenue, making a brief reverse curve to the left before returning to its previous trajectory at School Street and becoming a four-lane divided highway east of there. Bus. US 18/Bus. US 151/CTH-MV ends east of Verona at exit 81 on US 18/US 151, but only with an eastbound onramp and westbound offramp.

Major intersections

The entire route is in Verona, Dane County.

mi	km	Destinations	Notes
0.0	0.0	US 18 / US 151 Bus. US 151 begins	Begin US-Bus 151 overlap
1.3	2.1	CTH-M (Main Street)	
2.4	3.9	US 18 / US 151 Bus. US 151 ends	End US-Bus 151 overlap
1.000 mi = 1.609 km; 1.000 km = 0.621 mi

== Dane County alternate route ==
Alternate U.S. Highway 18
- Location: Dane County, Wisconsin

Alternate U.S. Highway 151
- Location: Dane County, Wisconsin

Alternate U.S. Highway 18 (Alt. US 18) is a permanently signed detour route that begins in Verona, Wisconsin. The route follows CTH-PB, CTH-M, and CTH-MM to connect with US 14 north of Oregon, then uses US 14 to reconnect with the main route in Madison. The route is concurrent with Alt. US 151.

Major intersections

The entire route is in Dane County.

Location	mi	km	Exit	Destinations	Notes
Verona	0.0	0.0		US 18 / US 151 – Madison, Mount Horeb Alt. US 151 begins	West end of Alt. US 151 overlap
Verona	0.2	0.32		CTH-M west	West end of CTH-M overlap
Fitchburg	7.3	11.7		CTH-M ends / CTH-MM south	East end of CTH-M overlap; west end of CTH-MM overlap
Fitchburg	7.6	12.2		US 14 east / CTH-MM north – Evansville	East end of CTH-MM overlap; west end of US 14 overlap
Fitchburg	11.3	18.2	134	To CTH-MM / Lacy Road	To CTH-MM only signed eastbound
Fitchburg	12.6	20.3	133	To CTH-MM / Mc Coy Road	Westbound exit eastbound entrance
Madison	13.4	21.6	132	US 12 / US 18 / US 151 / US 14 west Alt. US 151 ends	East end of US 14 and Alt. US 151 overlap; access to SSM Health Saint Mary's Hospital - Madison
1.000 mi = 1.609 km; 1.000 km = 0.621 mi: Concurrency terminus; Incomplete access

== Milwaukee alternate route ==
Alternate U.S. Highway 18
- Location: Milwaukee, Wisconsin

Alternate U.S. Highway 18 (Alt. US 18) is a former segment of US 18 within Milwaukee, Wisconsin.

== See also ==
- List of special routes of the United States Numbered Highway System
