= Kieler, Wisconsin =

Census-designated place in Wisconsin, United States

- Census-designated place
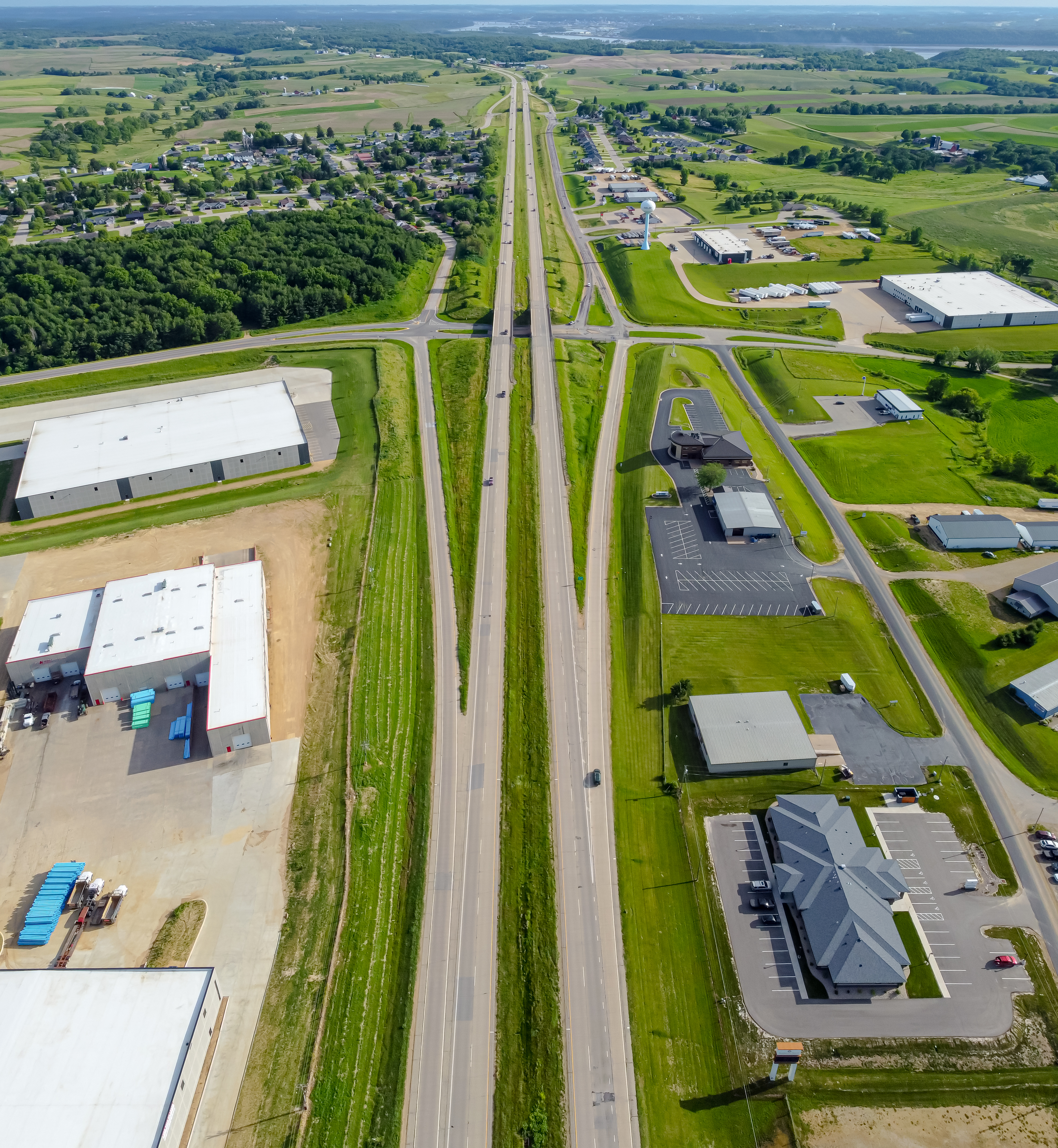
- US-61/151 run through town

- Location within Wisconsin Location within the United States
- Coordinates: 42°34′59″N 90°36′20″W
- Country: United States
- State: Wisconsin
- County: Grant
- Town: Jamestown

Area
  - Total: 0.840 sq mi (2.18 km^{2})
  - Land: 0.840 sq mi (2.18 km^{2})
  - Water: 0 sq mi (0 km^{2})

Population (2020)
  - Total: 557
  - Density: 663/sq mi (256/km^{2})
- Time zone: UTC-6 (Central (CST))
  - Summer (DST): UTC-5 (CDT)
- Area code: 608

Kieler is an unincorporated census-designated place in the Town of Jamestown in Grant County, Wisconsin. It is located about seven miles northeast of the Iowa-Wisconsin border and the city of Dubuque, Iowa, and about four miles southwest of Dickeyville, Wisconsin, along U.S. routes 61 and 151. As of the 2020 census, its population was 557, up from 497 at the 2010 census.

== History ==
The community was named after John Kieler, an immigrant from Prussia who arrived in the area in 1855.

== Education ==
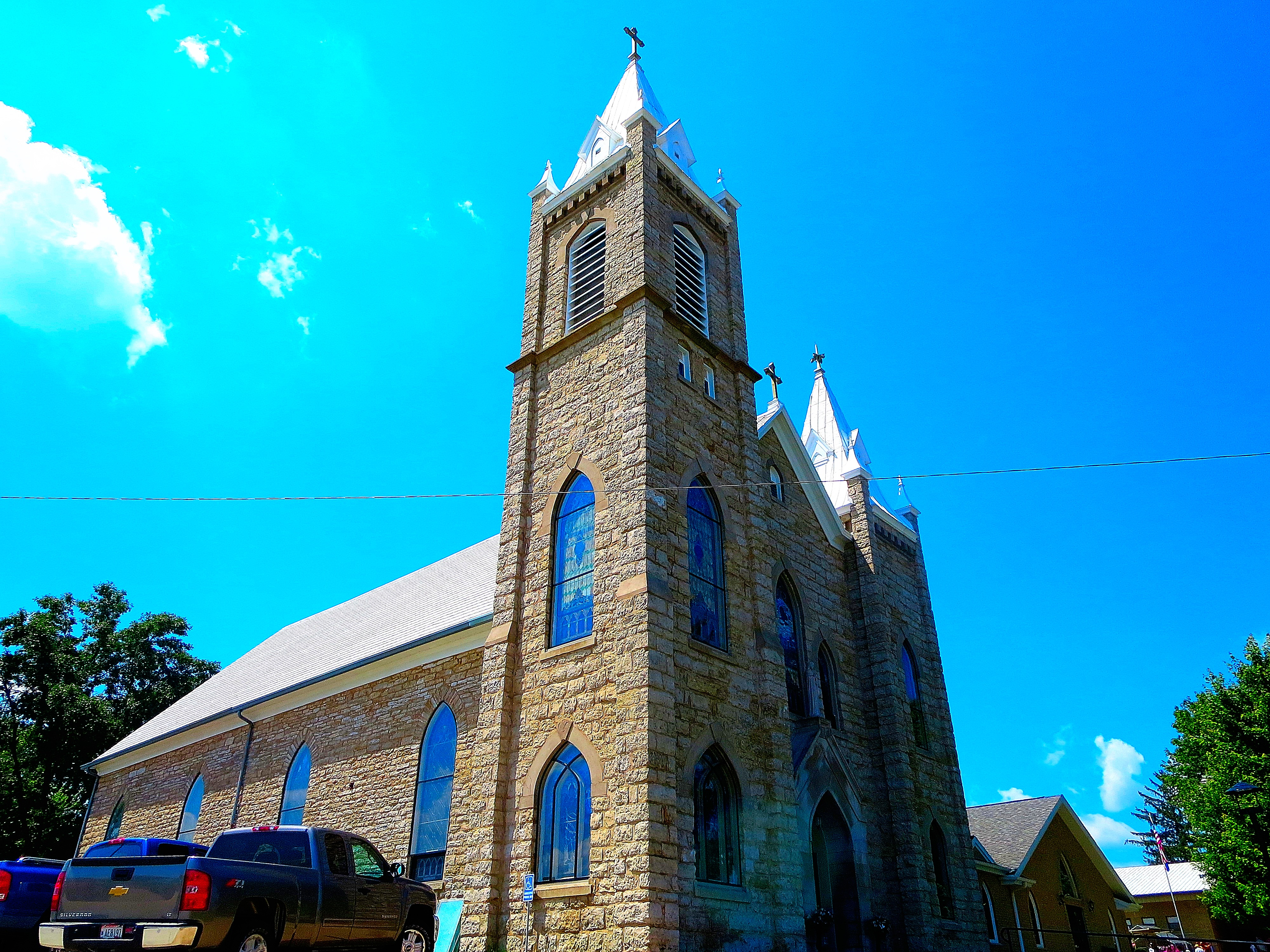
Immaculate Conception Catholic Church

Immaculate Conception, the only Catholic church in Kieler, was constructed in 1858. The church was remodeled in 1896, when a rock exterior and two front towers were added. A 2004 addition includes a large gathering area on the west side. Holy Ghost/Immaculate Conception School serves students in grades 4 through 8. Students in kindergarten through 3rd grade attend school in Dickeyville.
