= East Bristol, Wisconsin =

- Unincorporated community
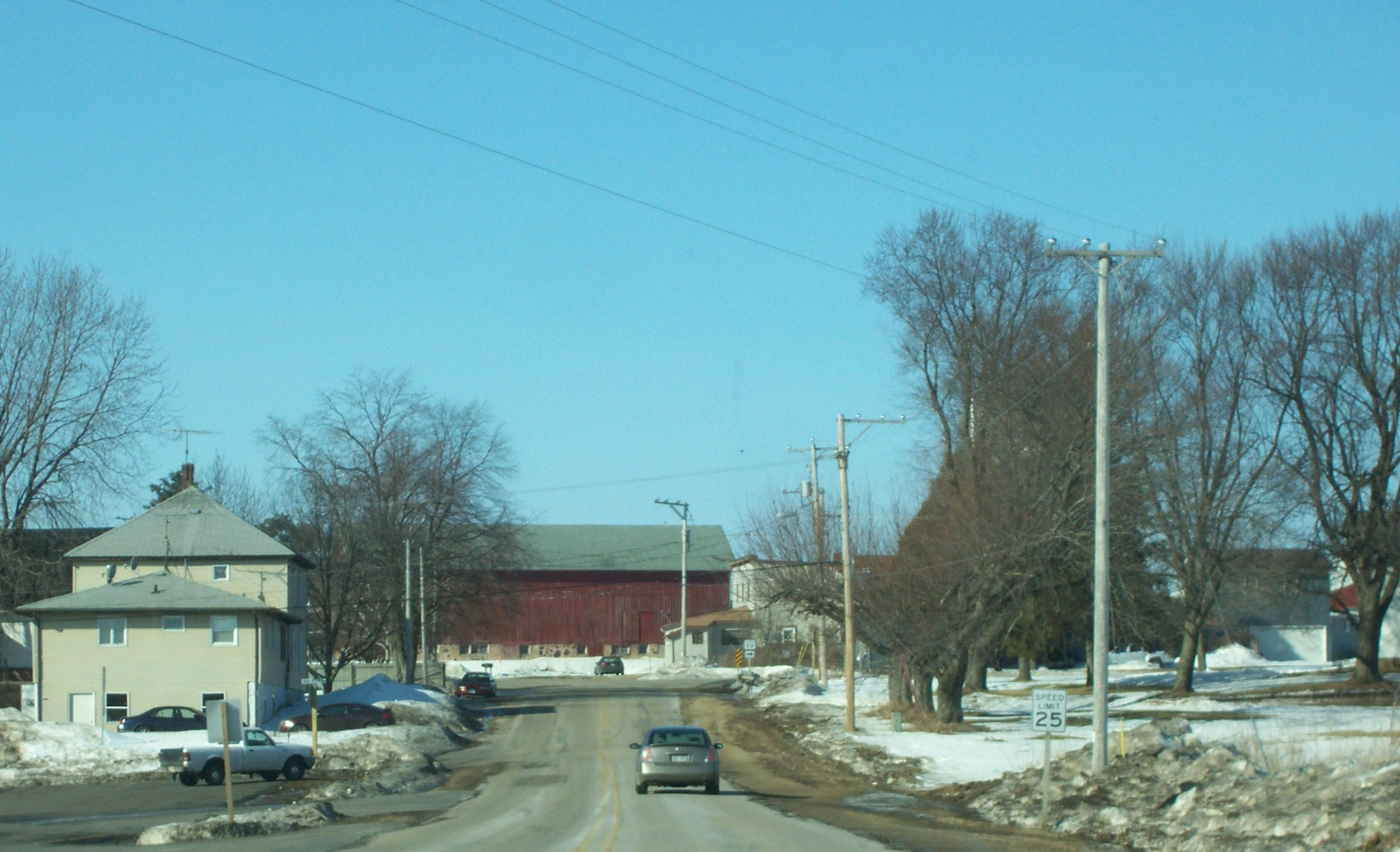
- Looking west at East Bristol

- Location within Wisconsin Location within the United States
- Coordinates: 43°16′06″N 89°09′09″W
- Country: United States
- State: Wisconsin
- County: Dane County
- Town: Bristol
- Elevation: 951 ft (290 m)
- Time zone: UTC-6 (Central (CST))
  - Summer (DST): UTC-5 (CDT)
- Area code: 608
- GNIS feature ID: 1564305

St. Joseph's Catholic Church in East Bristol, Wisconsin

East Bristol is an unincorporated community in the town of Bristol, in Dane County, Wisconsin, United States.

== History ==
It was first known as "Columbus Settlement."
