= Bristol, Dane County, Wisconsin =

Bristol, Wisconsin
- Town
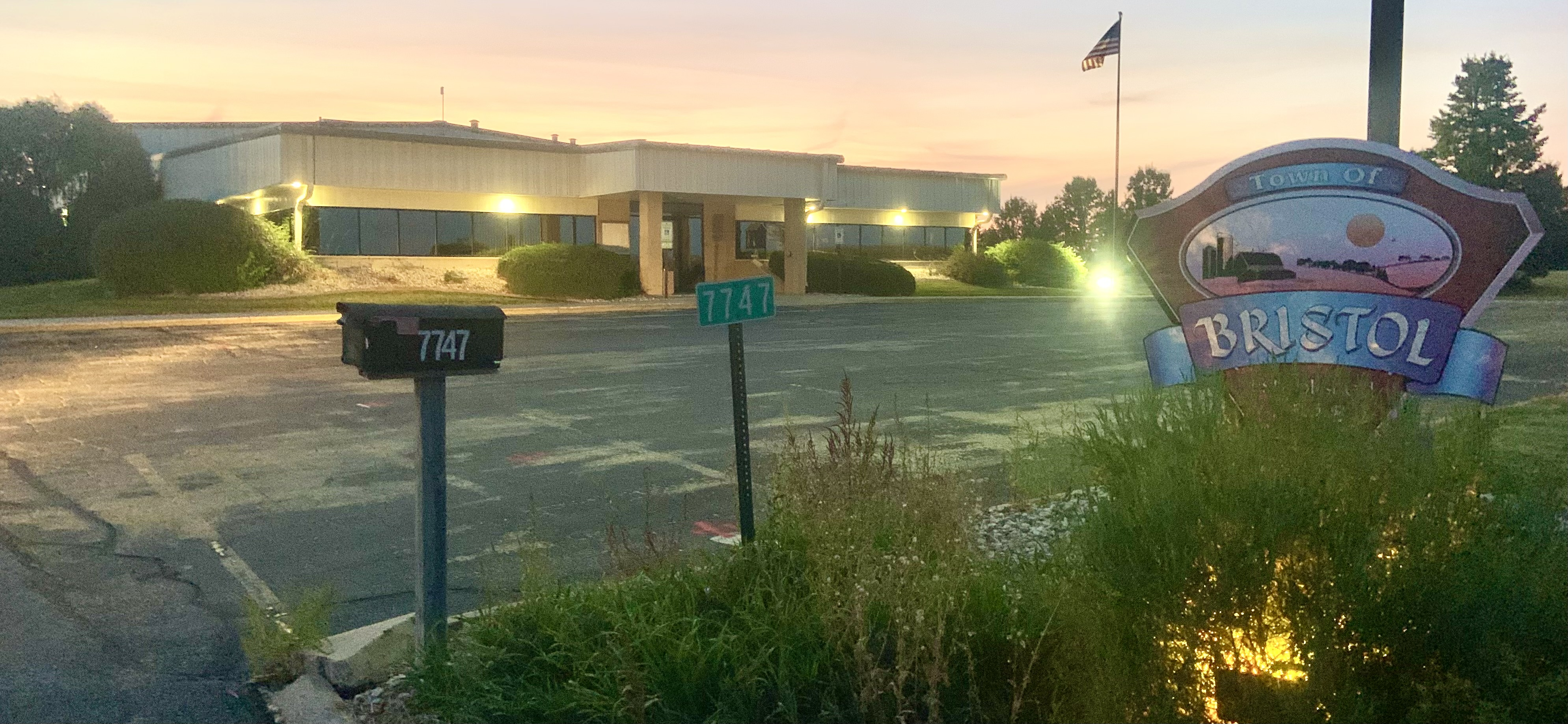
- Town hall

- Location in Dane County and the state of Wisconsin.

- Location within Wisconsin Location within the United States
- Coordinates: 43°14′45″N 89°10′44″W
- Country: United States
- State: Wisconsin
- County: Dane
- Established: 1848

Government
  - Town Chairman: Gerald Derr
  - Town Supervisor #1: Ben Grove
  - Town Supervisor #2: Brian Willison
  - Town Manager/Clerk-Treasurer: Kim Grob

Area
  - Total: 34.4 sq mi (89.1 km^{2})
  - Land: 34.4 sq mi (89.1 km^{2})
  - Water: 0 sq mi (0.0 km^{2})
- Elevation: 909 ft (277 m)

Population (2020)
  - Total: 4,447
  - Density: 78/sq mi (30.3/km^{2})
- Time zone: UTC-6 (Central (CST))
  - Summer (DST): UTC-5 (CDT)
- ZIP Code: 53590
- Area code: 608
- FIPS code: 55-09775
- GNIS feature ID: 1582862
- Website: https://www.tn.bristol.wi.gov/

Bristol is a town in Dane County, Wisconsin, United States, located just north of the city of Sun Prairie and 15 miles northeast of Madison. The population was 4,447 at the 2020 census. The unincorporated communities of Bakers Corners, East Bristol, and North Bristol are located in the town.

== Geography ==
According to the United States Census Bureau, the town has a total area of 34.4 square miles (89.1 km^{2}), all land.

== Demographics ==
The town had 2,698 people, 928 households, and 781 families according to the 2000 census. The population density was 78.5 people per square mile (30.3/km^{2}). There were 956 housing units at an average density of 27.8 per square mile (10.7/km^{2}). The racial makeup of the town was 97.74% White, 0.52% African American, 0.07% Native American, 0.93% Asian, 0.26% from other races, and 0.48% from two or more races. Hispanic or Latino of any race were 0.74% of the population.

There were 928 households, out of which 44.3% had children under the age of 18 living with them, 75.5% were married couples living together, 4.5% had a female householder with no husband present, and 15.8% were non-families. 10.8% of all households were made up of individuals, and 2.6% had someone living alone who was 65 years of age or older. The average household size was 2.91 and the average family size was 3.16.

In the town, the population was spread out, with 29.3% under the age of 18, 5.7% from 18 to 24, 33.7% from 25 to 44, 25.8% from 45 to 64, and 5.5% who were 65 years of age or older. The median age was 36 years. For every 100 females, there were 108.8 males. For every 100 females age 18 and over, there were 109.4 males.

The median income for a household in the town was $70,439, and the median income for a family was $73,309. Males had a median income of $42,364 versus $30,541 for females. The per capita income for the town was $26,273. About 1.0% of families and 2.5% of the population were below the poverty line, including 2.9% of those under age 18 and 3.0% of those age 65 or over.

== Economy ==
Bristol is primarily an agricultural town. In addition to agricultural land, there is an area of rural residential subdivisions located in the southwest corner of the town.
