= Mineral Point (town), Wisconsin =

Mineral Point, Wisconsin
- Town
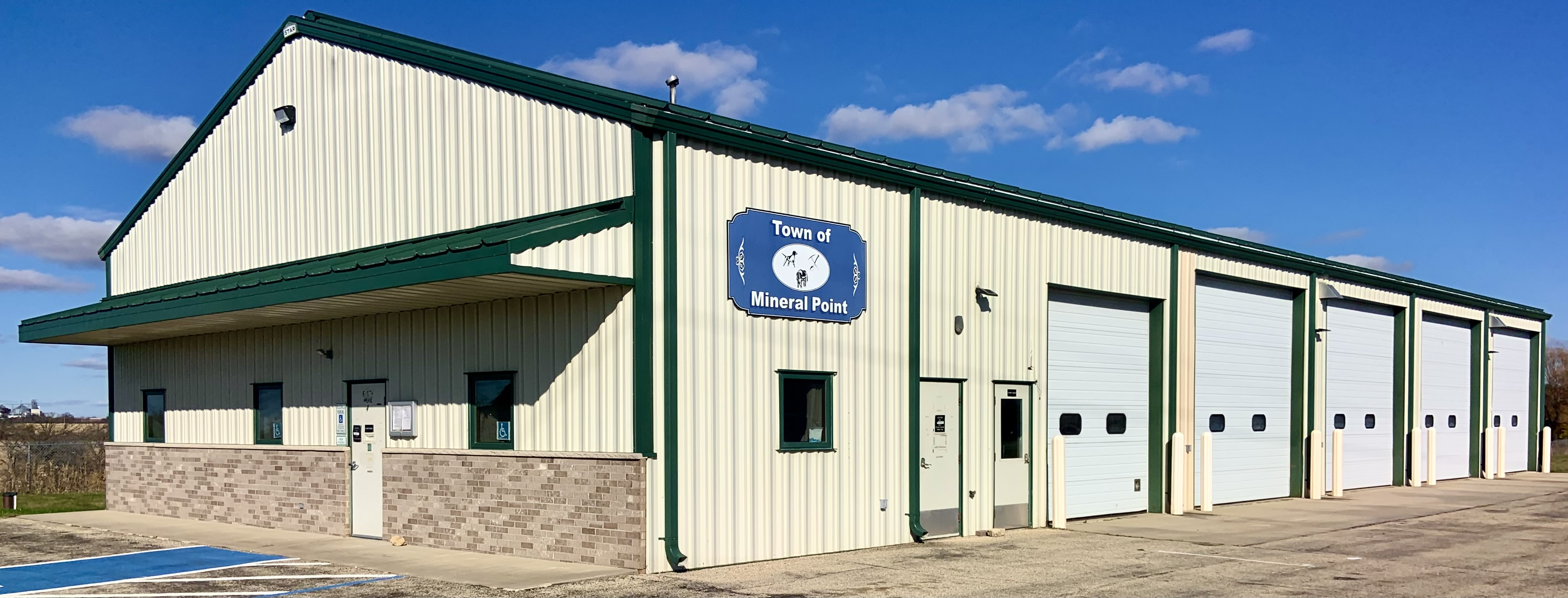
- Town hall

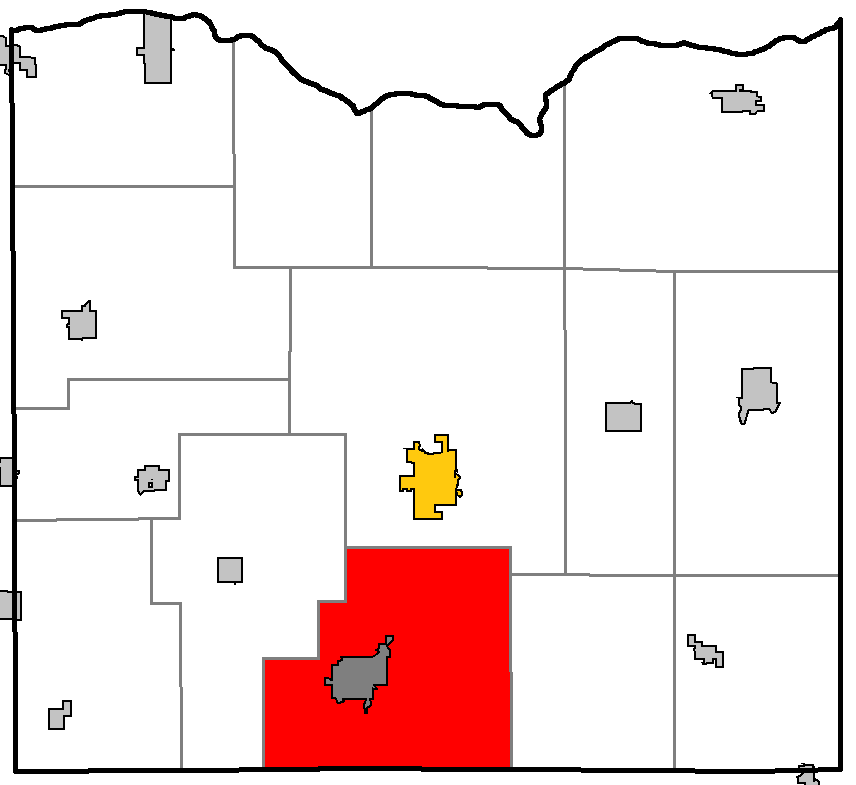
- Location of Mineral Point, within Iowa County, Wisconsin

- Location of Iowa County, Wisconsin
- Coordinates: 42°52′2″N 90°9′8″W
- Country: United States
- State: Wisconsin
- County: Iowa

Area
  - Total: 59.1 sq mi (153.1 km^{2})
  - Land: 59.0 sq mi (152.9 km^{2})
  - Water: 0.077 sq mi (0.2 km^{2})
- Elevation: 1,109 ft (338 m)

Population (2020)
  - Total: 974
  - Density: 16.5/sq mi (6.37/km^{2})
- Time zone: UTC-6 (Central (CST))
  - Summer (DST): UTC-5 (CDT)
- Area code: 608
- FIPS code: 55-53125
- GNIS feature ID: 1583726

Mineral Point is a town in Iowa County, Wisconsin, United States. The population was 974 at the 2020 census. The City of Mineral Point is located within the town.

== Geography ==
Mineral Point was originally settled in the early 19th century by immigrants attracted by the prospect of lead mining. Several Cornish immigrants were among the first to live in the city. Many of the early Cornish dwellings in Mineral Point have been preserved at Pendarvis, a state operated historic site.

== Demographics ==
As of the census of 2000, there were 867 people, 303 households, and 252 families residing in the town. The population density was 14.7 people per square mile (5.7/km^{2}). There were 320 housing units at an average density of 5.4 per square mile (2.1/km^{2}). The racial makeup of the town was 98.39% White, 0.12% Black or African American, 0.12% Native American, 0.46% Asian, and 0.92% from two or more races. 0.23% of the population were Hispanic or Latino of any race.

There were 303 households, out of which 43.2% had children under the age of 18 living with them, 73.6% were married couples living together, 5.0% had a female householder with no husband present, and 16.8% were non-families. 13.9% of all households were made up of individuals, and 3.0% had someone living alone who was 65 years of age or older. The average household size was 2.86 and the average family size was 3.14.

In the town, the population was spread out, with 31.4% under the age of 18, 6.6% from 18 to 24, 27.3% from 25 to 44, 26.4% from 45 to 64, and 8.3% who were 65 years of age or older. The median age was 35 years. For every 100 females, there were 103.5 males. For every 100 females age 18 and over, there were 109.5 males.

The median income for a household in the town was $42,171, and the median income for a family was $47,500. Males had a median income of $29,545 versus $23,906 for females. The per capita income for the town was $17,337. About 9.2% of families and 8.5% of the population were below the poverty line, including 7.8% of those under age 18 and 16.7% of those age 65 or over.
