= Langlade =

Langlade may refer to:

== Places ==
- Langlade County, Wisconsin, United States
  - Langlade, Wisconsin, a town in the United States
  - Langlade (community), Wisconsin, an unincorporated community in the United States
  - Langlade County Airport, in Antigo, Wisconsin
  - Langlade County Courthouse, in Antigo, Wisconsin
- Langlade, Gard, a commune in France
- Langlade Island, in the North Atlantic archipelago of Saint-Pierre and Miquelon, France
  - Miquelon-Langlade, a commune in France comprising Langlade Island

== People ==
- Adam Girard de Langlade Mpali (born 2002), Gabonese swimmer
- Augustin Langlade (1703–c. 1771), French fur-trader
- Aya Girard de Langlade Mpali (born 2004), Gabonese swimmer
- Charles Michel de Langlade (1729–1801), French/Ottawa fur-trader who fought in the French and Indian War
- Colette Langlade (born 1956), French politician
- Fabrice Langlade (born 1964), French sculptor
- François Langlade (c. 1647–1702), French Catholic priest
- Françoise de Langlade (1920–1983), French magazine editor
- Jean-Claude Langlade (born 1963), French rugby union player
- Jean-Louis-Ignace de La Serre, Sieur de Langlade (1662–1756), French novelist and playwright
