= Parrish =

Parrish may refer to:

== Places in the United States ==
- Parrish, Alabama
- Parrish, Florida
- Parrish, Illinois, a town destroyed in 1925 by the infamous Tri-State Tornado
- Parrish, Wisconsin, a town
- Parrish (community), Wisconsin, an unincorporated community
- Parrish Creek, a stream in Utah
- Parrish, Oregon

== Other uses ==
- Parrish (surname), for people with surname Parrish
- Parrish "PMD" Smith, American rapper
- Parrish (novel), a 1958 novel written by Mildred Savage
- Parrish (film), a 1961 film starring Troy Donahue based on the 1958 novel
- Parrish Art Museum, Long Island, New York

== See also ==
- Parish (disambiguation)
