= Rolling, Wisconsin =

- Town
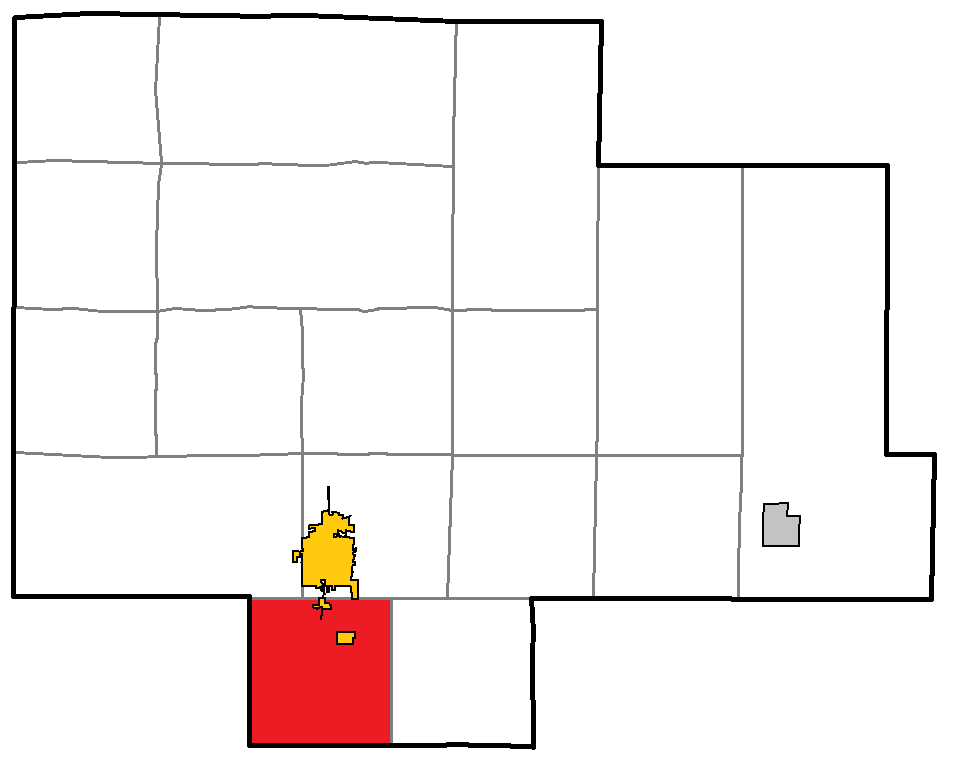
- Location of Rolling, within Langlade County
- Coordinates: 45°4′30″N 89°9′32″W
- Country: United States
- State: Wisconsin
- County: Langlade

Area
  - Total: 35.99 sq mi (93.22 km^{2})
  - Land: 35.9 sq mi (93.1 km^{2})
  - Water: 0.046 sq mi (0.12 km^{2})
- Elevation: 1,512 ft (461 m)

Population (2020)
  - Total: 1,432
  - Density: 39.8/sq mi (15.4/km^{2})
- Time zone: UTC-6 (Central (CST))
  - Summer (DST): UTC-5 (CDT)
- ZIP Code: 54409 (Antigo)
- Area codes: 715 & 534
- FIPS code: 55-69175
- GNIS feature ID: 1584059

Rolling is a town in Langlade County, Wisconsin, United States. The population was 1,432 at the 2020 census. The unincorporated community of Elmhurst is located within the town. The town established a post office in 1882. It was later discontinued in 1884.

== Geography ==
Rolling is in southern Langlade County, bordered to the south by Shawano County and to the west by Marathon County. It is bordered to the north partly by the city of Antigo, the Langlade county seat.

According to the United States Census Bureau, the town of Rolling has a total area of 36.0 square miles (93.2 km^{2}), of which 0.05 square miles (0.12 km^{2}), or 0.13%, are water. The northwestern part of the town is drained by Spring Brook, a southwestward-flowing tributary of the Eau Claire River, a tributary of the Wisconsin River and thus part of the Mississippi River watershed, while the hillier southeastern part of the town drains to the Middle Branch of the Embarrass River, which runs southeastward toward the Wolf River and eventually Green Bay on Lake Michigan.

== Demographics ==
As of the census of 2000, there were 1,452 people, 512 households, and 415 families residing in the town. The population density was 40.3 people per square mile (15.6/km^{2}). There were 539 housing units at an average density of 15 per square mile (5.8/km^{2}). The racial makeup of the town was 98.21% White, 0.55% Native American, 0.07% Asian, and 1.17% from two or more races. Hispanic or Latino people of any race were 1.1% of the population.

There were 512 households, out of which 39.8% had children under the age of 18 living with them, 71.3% were married couples living together, 5.9% had a female householder with no husband present, and 18.9% were non-families. 14.8% of all households were made up of individuals, and 6.3% had someone living alone who was 65 years of age or older. The average household size was 2.84 and the average family size was 3.13.

In the town, the population was spread out, with 27.4% under the age of 18, 8.1% from 18 to 24, 31.1% from 25 to 44, 22.5% from 45 to 64, and 10.9% who were 65 years of age or older. The median age was 36 years. For every 100 females, there were 110.1 males. For every 100 females age 18 and over, there were 105.9 males.

The median income for a household in the town was $43,026, and the median income for a family was $47,969. Males had a median income of $30,398 versus $20,952 for females. The per capita income for the town was $17,946. About 5.5% of families and 6.6% of the population were below the poverty line, including 8.8% of those under age 18 and 5.8% of those age 65 or over.
