= Summit Lake (Langlade County, Wisconsin) =

Lake in the state of Wisconsin, United States

- Location within Wisconsin Location within the United States
- Location: Langlade County, Wisconsin
- Coordinates: 45°22′28″N 89°12′26″W
- Type: lake
- Basin countries: United States
- Surface area: 279 acres (113 ha)
- Max. depth: 29 ft (8.8 m)
- Surface elevation: 1,690 ft (515 m)

Summit Lake is a lake in Langlade County, Wisconsin, in the United States. The community of Summit Lake is located primarily along its northern and eastern shores.

Summit Lake was named for its lofty elevation.

== See also ==
- List of lakes in Wisconsin
