= Ackley, Wisconsin =

- Town
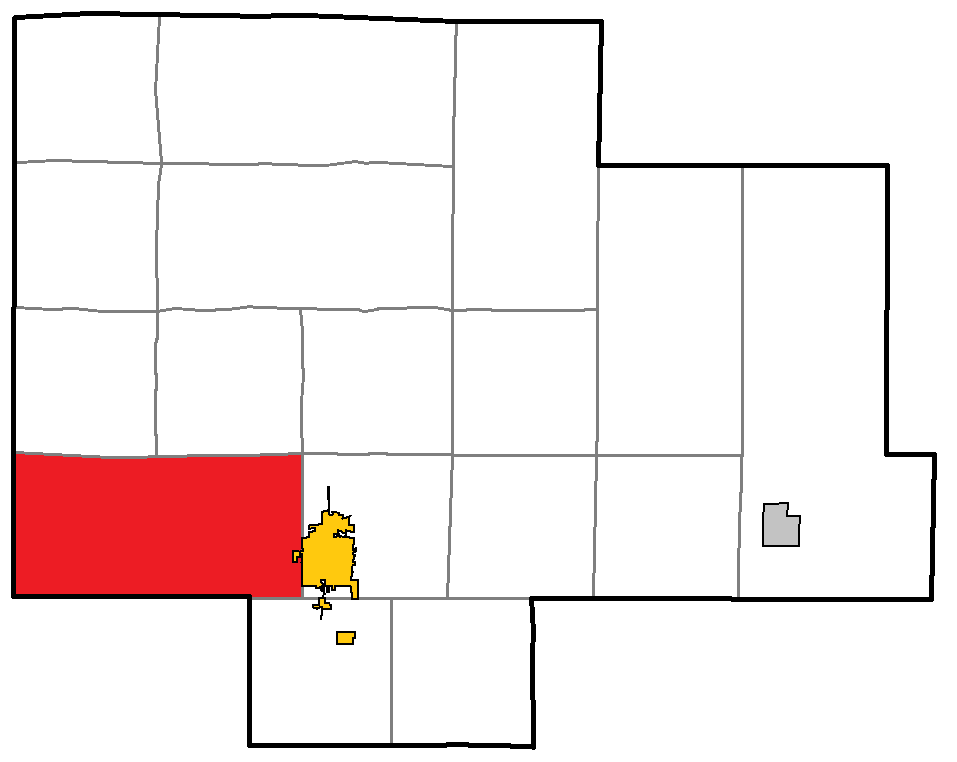
- Location of Ackley, within Langlade County
- Coordinates: 45°9′20″N 89°15′33″W
- Country: United States
- State: Wisconsin
- County: Langlade

Area
  - Total: 71.0 sq mi (183.9 km^{2})
  - Land: 71 sq mi (183 km^{2})
  - Water: 0.35 sq mi (0.9 km^{2})
- Elevation: 1,463 ft (446 m)

Population (2020)
  - Total: 467
  - Density: 6.61/sq mi (2.55/km^{2})
- Time zone: UTC-6 (Central (CST))
  - Summer (DST): UTC-5 (CDT)
- ZIP Codes: 54409 (Antigo); 54424 (Deerbrook)
- Area codes: 715 & 534
- FIPS code: 55-00225
- GNIS feature ID: 1582652

Ackley is a town in Langlade County, Wisconsin, United States. The population was 467 at the 2020 census. The town was founded on March 4, 1879. It was named after William L. Ackley, who established a logging camp in the area.

== Geography ==
Ackley is in southwestern Langlade County, bounded to the west by Lincoln County and to the south by Marathon County. The city of Antigo, the Langlade county seat, borders the town to the east.

According to the United States Census Bureau, Ackley has a total area of 71.0 square miles (183.9 km^{2}), of which 71 square miles (183 km^{2}) are land and 0.3 square miles (0.9 km^{2}), or 0.49%, are water. The East Branch and West Branch of the Eau Claire River flow southward across the eastern side of the town, joining to form the Eau Claire in the southeastern part of town. The Eau Claire River continues southwest to join the Wisconsin River south of Wausau. The northwestern part of Ackley drains to the Pine River, while the southwestern section is drained by the Trappe River. The Pine and the Trappe each flow westward to join the Wisconsin River north of Wausau.

== Demographics ==
As of the census of 2000, there were 510 people, 202 households, and 153 families residing in the town. The population density was 7.2 people per square mile (2.8/km^{2}). There were 226 housing units at an average density of 3.2 per square mile (1.2/km^{2}). The racial makeup of the town was 99.41% White, and 0.59% from two or more races. Hispanic or Latino people of any race were 0.2% of the population.

There were 202 households, out of which 30.7% had children under the age of 18 living with them, 64.9% were married couples living together, 6.4% had a female householder with no husband present, and 23.8% were non-families. 18.8% of all households were made up of individuals, and 10.4% had someone living alone who was 65 years of age or older. The average household size was 2.52 and the average family size was 2.87.

In the town, the population was spread out, with 22.4% under the age of 18, 5.9% from 18 to 24, 30.8% from 25 to 44, 24.7% from 45 to 64, and 16.3% who were 65 years of age or older. The median age was 40 years. For every 100 females, there were 104.8 males. For every 100 females age 18 and over, there were 103.1 males.

The median income for a household in the town was $42,000, and the median income for a family was $46,875. Males had a median income of $30,536 versus $19,643 for females. The per capita income for the town was $18,113. About 2.6% of families and 4.7% of the population were below the poverty line, including 4.4% of those under age 18 and 15.3% of those age 65 or over.

== Notable people ==
- John R. Fronek, farmer and politician, lived in the town
