= John R. Fronek =

American farmer and politician

John Raymond Fronek (May 11, 1883 – September 4, 1969) was an American farmer and politician.

Born in the Austro-Hungarian Empire, Fronek moved with his parents to Coal City, Illinois and worked as a coal miner. In 1900, he settled on a dairy farm in Ackley, Wisconsin, in Langlade County, Wisconsin. Fronek was involved with the farm, cheese production, and dairy cooperatives. He served on the Longfellow School Board, town supervisor, and town assessor. From 1927 to 1933, Fronek served in the Wisconsin State Assembly as a Progressive and a Republican. He died in Antigo, Wisconsin in 1969.
