= Peck, Wisconsin =

- Town
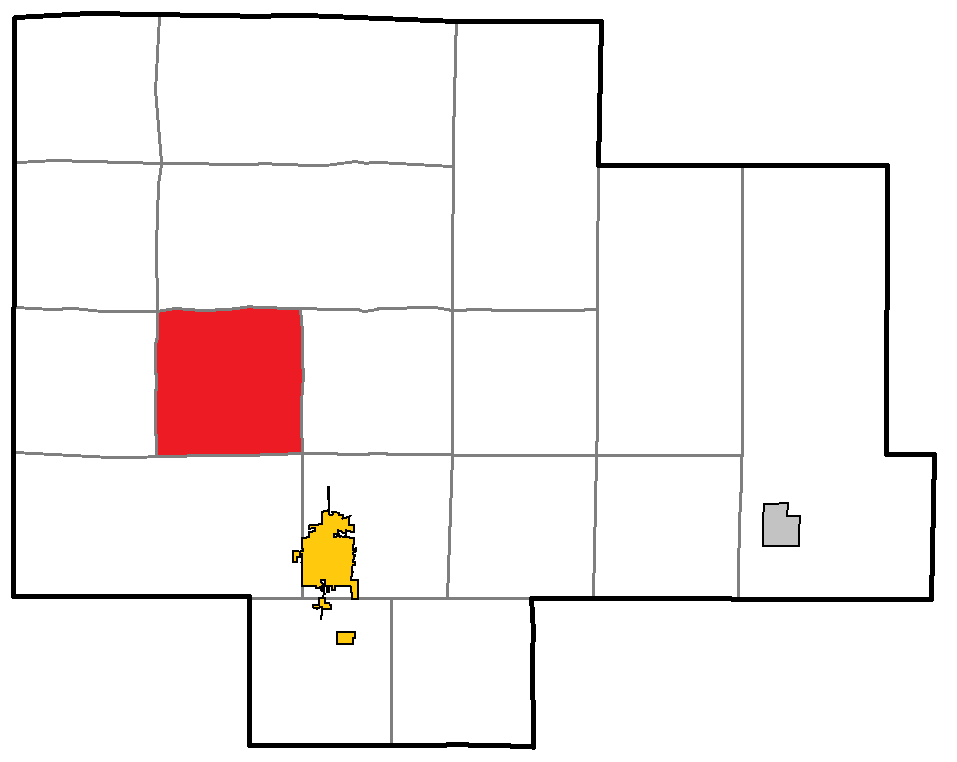
- Location of Peck, within Langlade County
- Coordinates: 45°14′58″N 89°14′27″W
- Country: United States
- State: Wisconsin
- County: Langlade

Area
  - Total: 37.20 sq mi (96.34 km^{2})
  - Land: 37.02 sq mi (95.88 km^{2})
  - Water: 0.18 sq mi (0.46 km^{2})
- Elevation: 1,526 ft (465 m)

Population (2020)
  - Total: 324
  - Density: 8.75/sq mi (3.38/km^{2})
- Time zone: UTC-6 (Central (CST))
  - Summer (DST): UTC-5 (CDT)
- ZIP Codes: 54424 (Deerbrook); 54409 (Antigo)
- Area codes: 715 & 534
- FIPS code: 55-067-61525
- GNIS feature ID: 1583901

Peck is a town in Langlade County, Wisconsin, United States. The population was 324 at the 2020 census. The unincorporated community of Ormsby is located in the town. The town was named in honor of George Wilbur Peck, who served as the 17th governor of Wisconsin from 1891 to 1895.

== Geography ==
Peck is in west-central Langlade County, 10 miles (16 km) northwest of Antigo, the county seat. According to the United States Census Bureau, the town has a total area of 37.2 square miles (96.3 km^{2}), of which 37.0 square miles (95.9 km^{2}) are land and 0.2 square miles (0.5 km^{2}), or 0.48%, are water. The town is primarily drained by the West Branch of the Eau Claire River, which flows from north to south across the center of town, and the southeastern corner of the town is drained by the East Branch.

== Demographics ==
As of the census of 2000, there were 354 people, 136 households, and 102 families residing in the town. The population density was 9.5 people per square mile (3.7/km^{2}). There were 163 housing units at an average density of 4.4 per square mile (1.7/km^{2}). The racial makeup of the town was 99.15% White, 0.28% African American, 0.28% Native American, and 0.28% from two or more races. Hispanic or Latino people of any race were 0.56% of the population.

There were 136 households, out of which 27.9% had children under the age of 18 living with them, 67.6% were married couples living together, 2.2% had a female householder with no husband present, and 25% were non-families. 20.6% of all households were made up of individuals, and 11% had someone living alone who was 65 years of age or older. The average household size was 2.6 and the average family size was 2.98.

In the town, the population was spread out, with 23.7% under the age of 18, 6.8% from 18 to 24, 25.4% from 25 to 44, 28.2% from 45 to 64, and 15.8% who were 65 years of age or older. The median age was 41 years. For every 100 females, there were 98.9 males. For every 100 females age 18 and over, there were 107.7 males.

The median income for a household in the town was $34,167, and the median income for a family was $40,781. Males had a median income of $29,643 versus $20,000 for females. The per capita income for the town was $15,466. About 1.9% of families and 5.6% of the population were below the poverty line, including none of those under age 18 and 5.3% of those age 65 or over.
