= Trappe River =

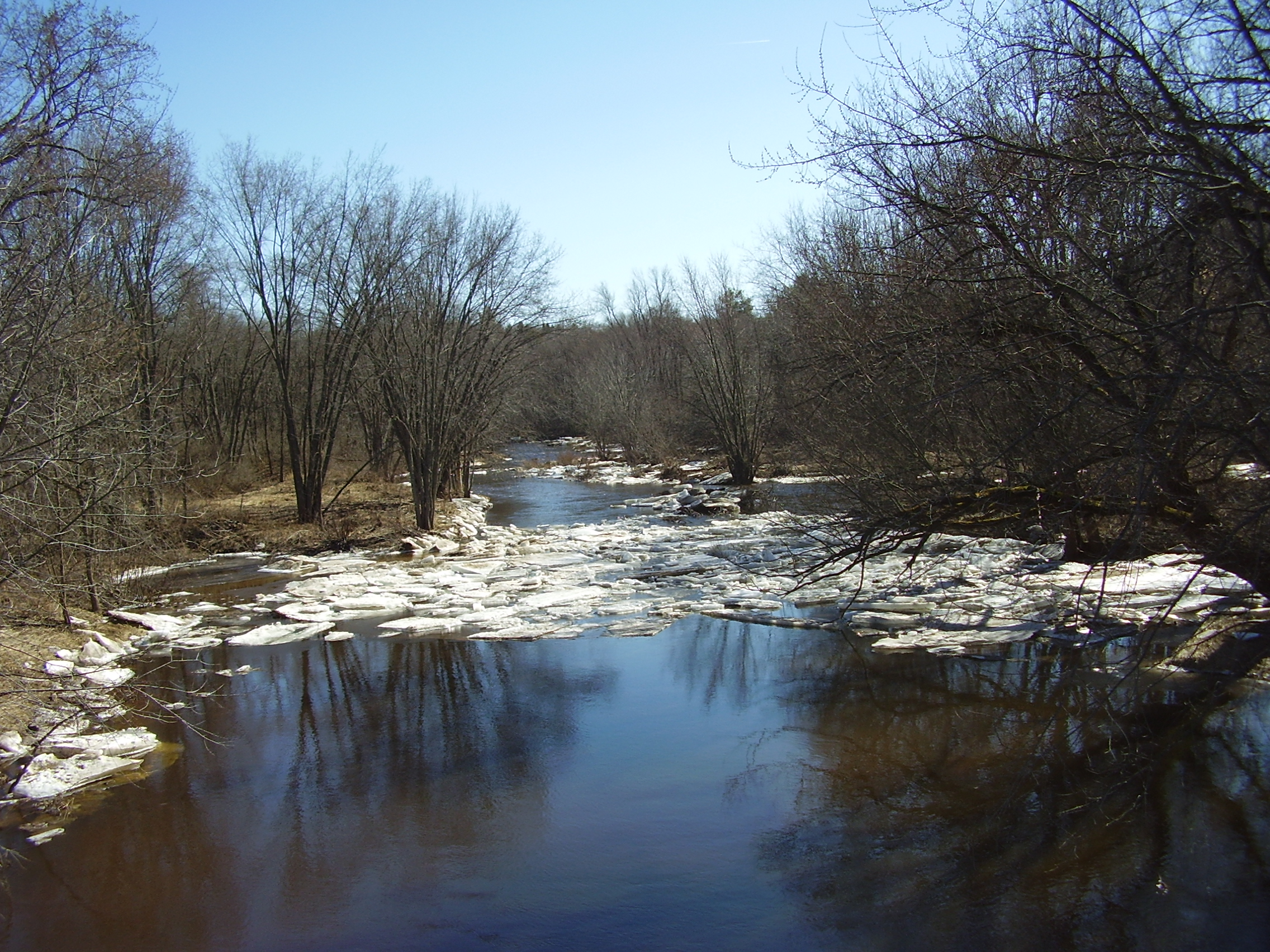
- Trappe River at Shady Lane Road bridge.

Physical characteristics
- Source
  - coordinates: 45.1574661°N 89.3501174°W
- Mouth
  - coordinates: 45.0813564°N 89.6215119°W
  - elevation: 1,204 feet (367 m)

Basin features
- Tributaries
  - right: Little Trappe River

The Trappe River is a tributary of the Wisconsin River in Marathon County and Langlade County in the state of Wisconsin in the United States. Other spellings include Trapp and Trap. In Ojibwe it was known as Tah-so-so-win-ing Se-be. Its source is in the town of Ackley and its confluence with the Wisconsin is midway between Merrill and Wausau.

Historically the Trappe River was a rich source of pine timber for mills in Wausau, as well as for a mill at the mouth of the river.
