= Wolf River, Langlade County, Wisconsin =

Wolf River, Wisconsin
- Town
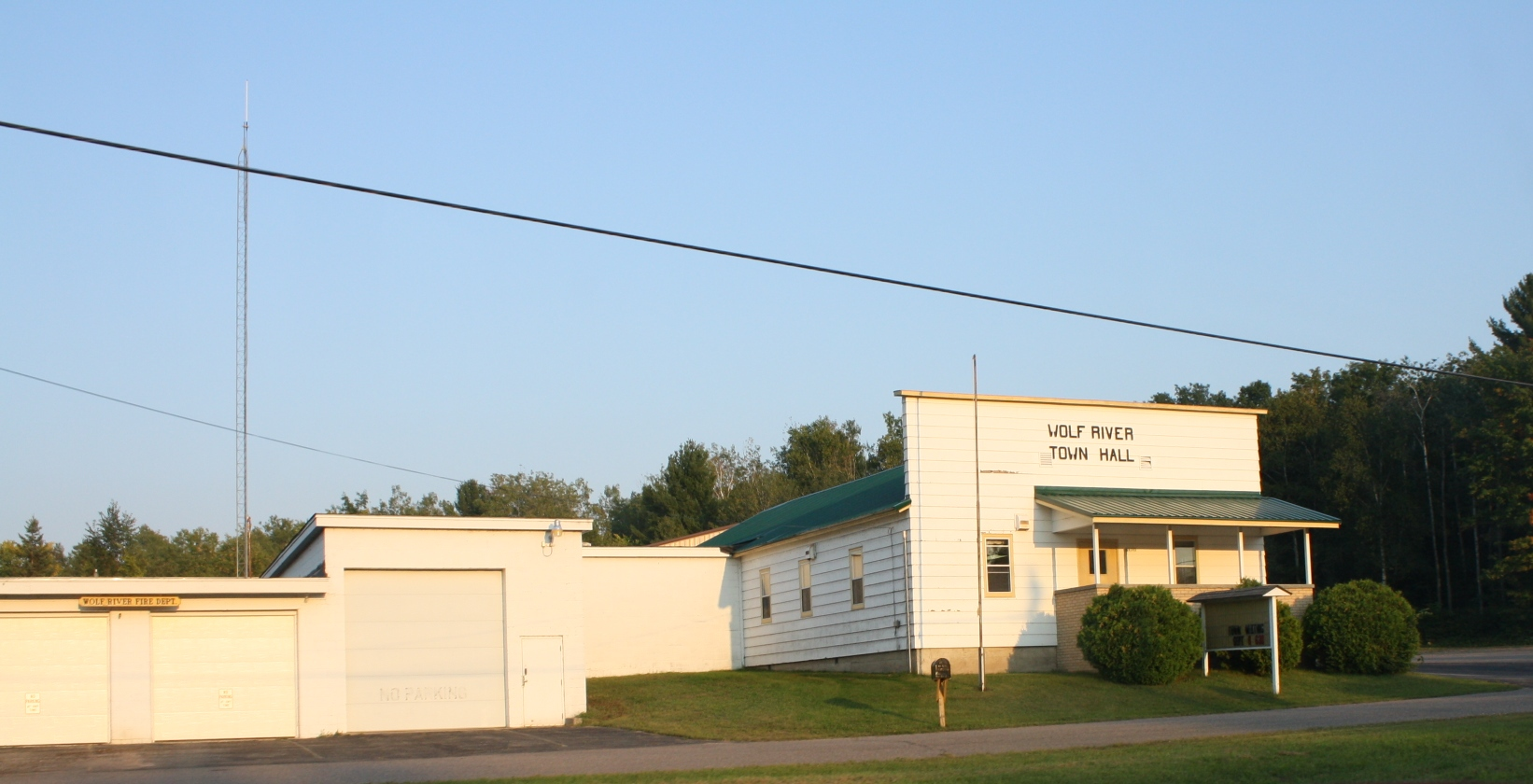
- Town hall and fire station on WIS 55

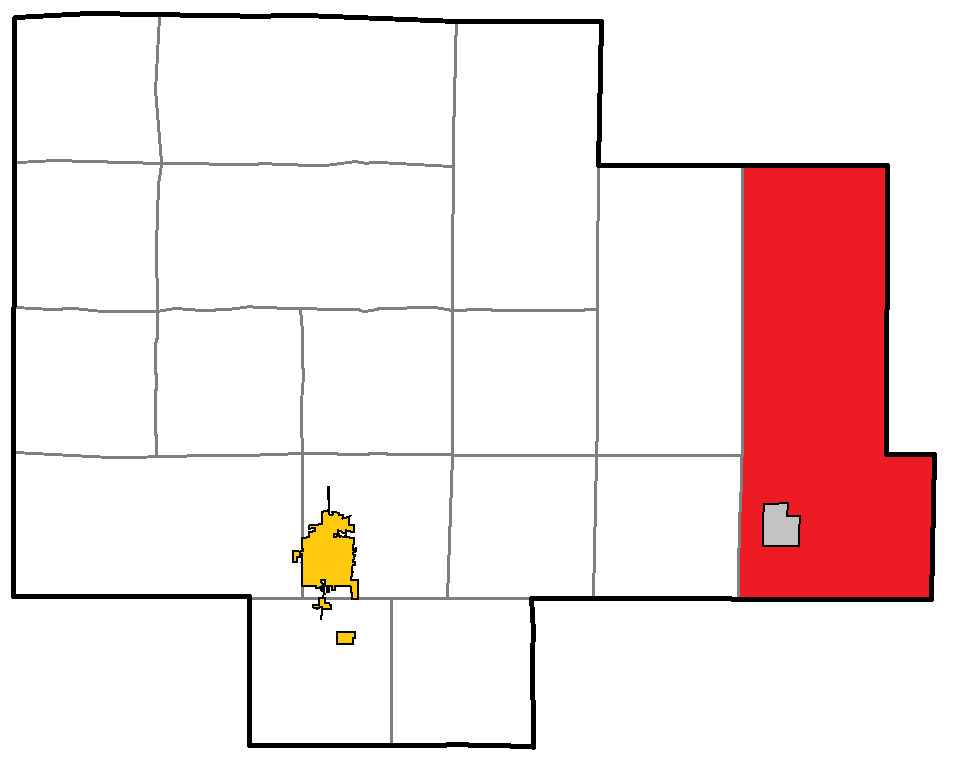
- Location of Wolf River, within Langlade County
- Coordinates: 45°12′42″N 88°44′33″W
- Country: United States
- State: Wisconsin
- County: Langlade
- Established: November 10, 1886

Area
  - Total: 118.87 sq mi (307.87 km^{2})
  - Land: 116.81 sq mi (302.53 km^{2})
  - Water: 2.06 sq mi (5.34 km^{2})
- Elevation: 1,440 ft (440 m)

Population (2020)
  - Total: 783
  - Density: 6.70/sq mi (2.59/km^{2})
- Time zone: UTC-6 (Central (CST))
  - Summer (DST): UTC-5 (CDT)
- ZIP Code: 54491 (White Lake)
- Area codes: 715 & 534
- FIPS code: 55-88450
- GNIS feature ID: 1584468
- Website: wolfriverwi.com

Wolf River is a town in Langlade County, Wisconsin, United States. The population was 783 at the 2020 census, up from 731 at the 2010 census. The unincorporated communities of Hollister, Langlade, and Markton and the ghost town of Van Ostrand are in the town. The village of White Lake, a separate municipality, is surrounded by the town. The township is served by the Wolf River Volunteer Fire Department.

== History ==
The town of Elton was created from eastern parts of the town of Langlade on November 10, 1886. It was named for Elton Larzelere, the son of one of the area's early pioneers.

The area that is today Evergreen was detached from Elton in 1896, leaving Elton with the area it occupies today. The town changed its name to "Wolf River" on April 22, 1925.

== Geography ==
Wolf River is the eastern most town in Langlade County. It is bordered to the north by Forest County, to the east by Oconto County, and to the south by Menominee County. The village of White Lake is surrounded by the southern part of the town.

According to the United States Census Bureau, the town has a total area of 118.9 square miles (307.9 km^{2}), of which 116.8 square miles (302.5 km^{2}) are land and 2.0 square miles (5.3 km^{2}), or 1.74%, are water. The Wolf River, a tributary of the Fox River flows southeasterly across the southern part of the town, passing the community of Langlade and running east of White Lake.

== Demographics ==
As of the census of 2000, there were 856 people, 368 households, and 255 families residing in the town. The population density was 7.3 people per square mile (2.8/km^{2}). There were 746 housing units at an average density of 6.4 per square mile (2.5/km^{2}). The racial makeup of the town was 98.95% White, 0.58% Native American, 0.12% Asian, and 0.35% from two or more races. Hispanic or Latino people of any race were 0.58% of the population.

There were 368 households, out of which 21.7% had children under the age of 18 living with them, 61.1% were married couples living together, 3.3% had a female householder with no husband present, and 30.7% were non-families. 25.8% of all households were made up of individuals, and 12.8% had someone living alone who was 65 years of age or older. The average household size was 2.31 and the average family size was 2.76.

In the town, the population was spread out, with 22.1% under the age of 18, 3.5% from 18 to 24, 23.2% from 25 to 44, 29% from 45 to 64, and 22.2% who were 65 years of age or older. The median age was 46 years. For every 100 females, there were 109.8 males. For every 100 females age 18 and over, there were 104.6 males.

The median income for a household in the town was $31,413, and the median income for a family was $36,771. Males had a median income of $26,667 versus $21,797 for females. The per capita income for the town was $16,224. About 4.8% of families and 9.1% of the population were below the poverty line, including 9.8% of those under age 18 and 7.3% of those age 65 or over.
