= Vilas, Wisconsin =

Town in the U.S. state of Wisconsin

- Town
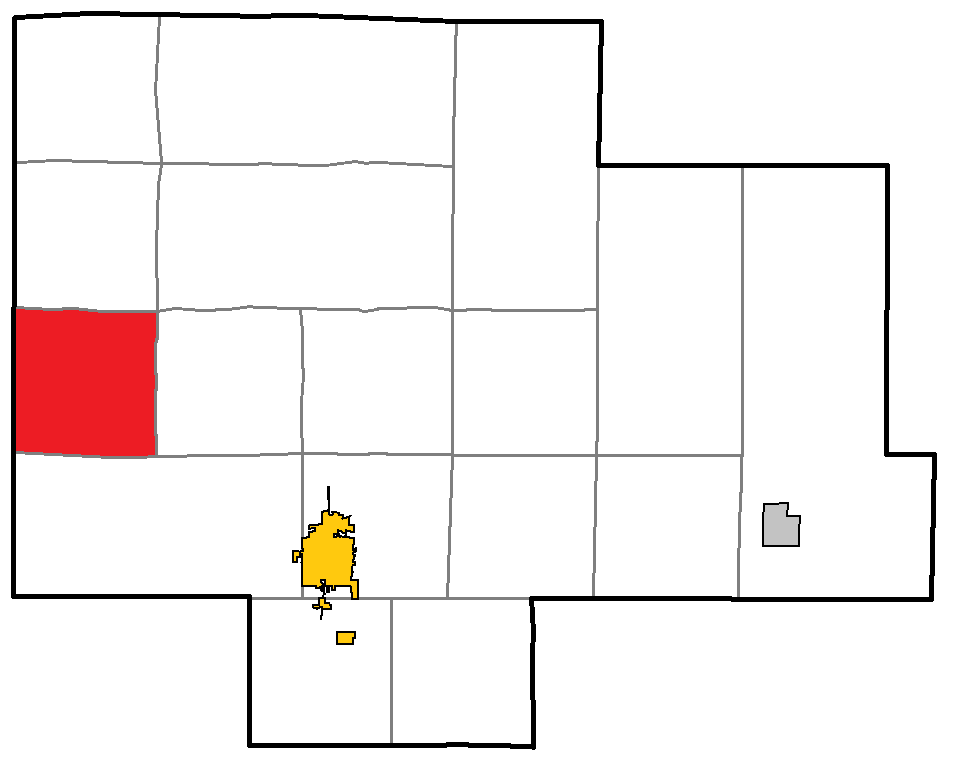
- Location of Vilas, within Langlade County
- Coordinates: 45°14′52″N 89°21′52″W
- Country: United States
- State: Wisconsin
- County: Langlade

Area
  - Total: 35.8 sq mi (92.8 km^{2})
  - Land: 35.80 sq mi (92.73 km^{2})
  - Water: 0.027 sq mi (0.07 km^{2})
- Elevation: 1,510 ft (460 m)

Population (2020)
  - Total: 226
  - Density: 6.31/sq mi (2.44/km^{2})
- Time zone: UTC-6 (Central (CST))
  - Summer (DST): UTC-5 (CDT)
- ZIP Codes: 54435 (Gleason); 54424 (Deerbrook)
- Area codes: 715 & 534
- FIPS code: 55-82825
- GNIS feature ID: 1584332

Vilas is a town in Langlade County, Wisconsin, United States. The population was 226 at the 2020 census.

== Geography ==
Vilas is in western Langlade County, bordered to the west by Lincoln County. It is 18 miles (29 km) northwest of Antigo, the county seat. According to the United States Census Bureau, the town has a total area of 35.8 square miles (92.8 km^{2}), of which 0.03 square miles (0.07 km^{2}), or 0.08%, are water. Most of the town is drained by southwestward-flowing tributaries of the Pine River, which joins the Wisconsin River south of Merrill. The southeastern and northeastern corners of the town, however, drain east to the West Branch of the Eau Claire River, leading to the Wisconsin River, south of Wausau.

== Demographics ==
As of the census of 2000, there were 249 people, 97 households, and 64 families residing in the town. The population density was 6.9 people per square mile (2.7/km^{2}). There were 161 housing units at an average density of 4.5 per square mile (1.7/km^{2}). The racial makeup of the town was 100% White.

There were 97 households, out of which 29.9% had children under the age of 18 living with them, 59.8% were married couples living together, 3.1% had a female householder with no husband present, and 33% were non-families. 27.8% of all households were made up of individuals, and 11.3% had someone living alone who was 65 years of age or older. The average household size was 2.57 and the average family size was 3.23.

In the town, the population was spread out, with 24.5% under the age of 18, 6.8% from 18 to 24, 28.1% from 25 to 44, 28.9% from 45 to 64, and 11.6% who were 65 years of age or older. The median age was 39 years. For every 100 females, there were 96.1 males. For every 100 females age 18 and over, there were 108.9 males.

The median income for a household in the town was $30,417, and the median income for a family was $42,083. Males had a median income of $26,979 versus $15,833 for females. The per capita income for the town was $14,423. About 3.7% of families and 7.1% of the population were below the poverty line, including 11.3% of those under the age of eighteen and 12.9% of those 65 or over.
