= Parish (disambiguation) =

Parish is a church territorial unit constituting a division of a diocese.

Parish may also refer to:

== Church territorial units ==
- Parish (Catholic Church)
- Parish (Church of England)
- Parish (Denmark), Church of Denmark

== Government ==
Although derived from church usage, Parish may also refer to a secular local government administrative entity:

- Parish (administrative division), in other countries outside the British Isles
- Civil parish (disambiguation), several forms in the British Isles

== People with the name ==
- Parish Crooks, birth name of Tupac Shakur (1971–1996), American rapper

== Places ==
- Parish (village), New York, a village located in the Town of Parish, New York, US
- Town of Parish, New York
- Cape Henry Parish, Greenland

== Other uses ==
- The Parish, a defunct Louisiana cuisine restaurant in Portland, Oregon, US
- The Parish, a campaign in the 2009 video game Left 4 Dead 2
- Parish (TV series), a 2024 American drama series

== See also ==
- Parrish (disambiguation)
