= Phlox, Wisconsin =

- Unincorporated community
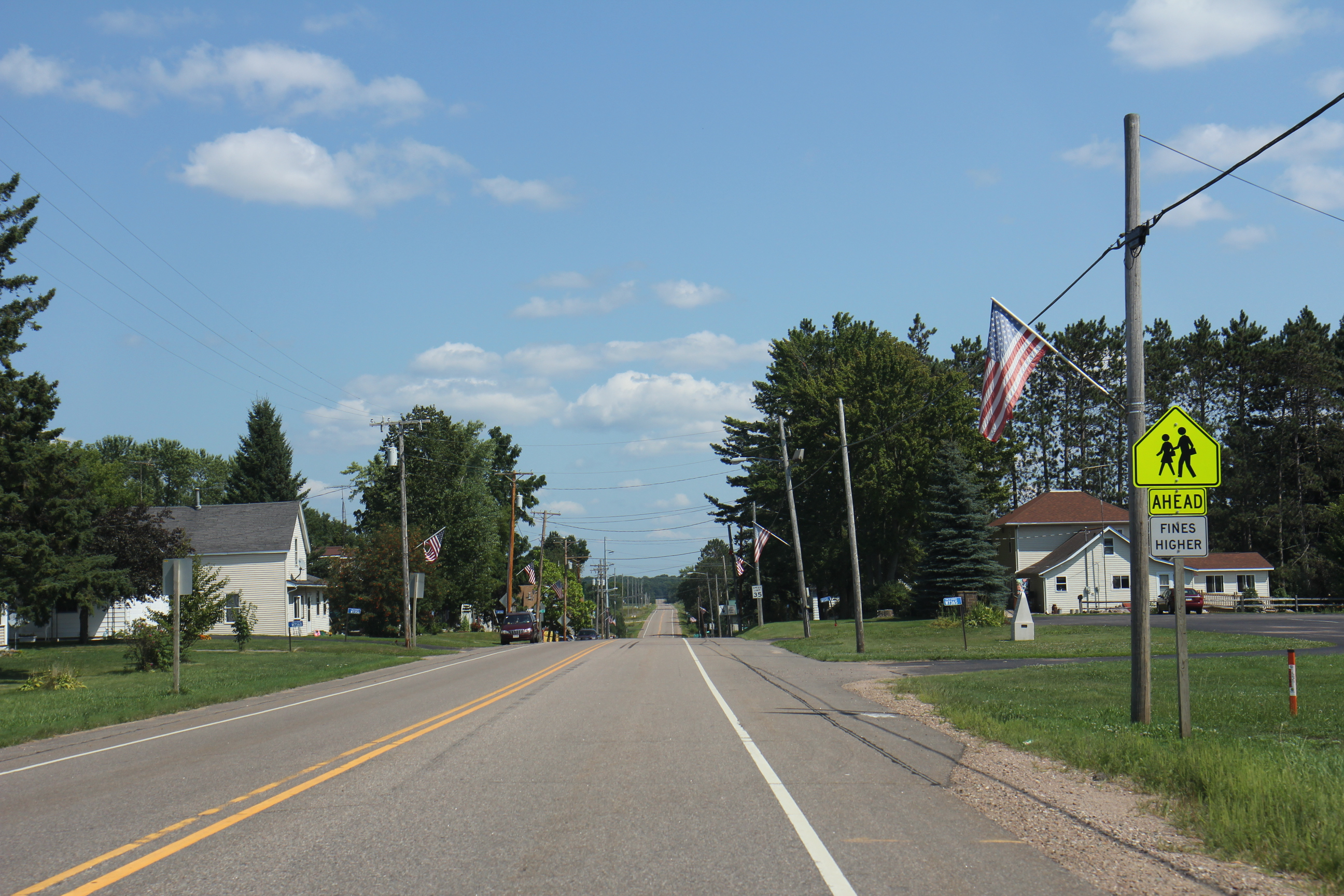
- Downtown Phlox

- Location within Wisconsin Location within the United States
- Coordinates: 45°03′04″N 89°00′51″W
- Country: United States
- State: Wisconsin
- County: Langlade
- Town: Norwood
- Elevation: 1,306 ft (398 m)
- Time zone: UTC-6 (Central (CST))
  - Summer (DST): UTC-5 (CDT)
- ZIP code: 54464
- Area codes: 715 & 534
- GNIS feature ID: 1571305

Phlox is an unincorporated community in the town of Norwood, Langlade County, Wisconsin, United States. It is situated on Wisconsin Highway 47, southeast of Antigo. Phlox has a post office.

Before contact with Europeans, the area around Phlox was inhabited by indigenous peoples, including the Potawatomi. There is no evidence indicating a Potawatomi settlement in the area, but the word for the location in Potawatomi is "mekchakoynak", which means "place of the frogs".

== Climate ==
The Köppen Climate Classification subtype for this climate is "Dfb" (Warm Summer Continental Climate).

Climate data for Phlox, Wisconsin
Month	Jan	Feb	Mar	Apr	May	Jun	Jul	Aug	Sep	Oct	Nov	Dec	Year
Mean daily maximum °C (°F)	−6 (21)	−3 (27)	3 (37)	12 (53)	19 (67)	24 (75)	26 (79)	24 (76)	19 (67)	13 (55)	3 (37)	−4 (25)	11 (52)
Mean daily minimum °C (°F)	−18 (0)	−15 (5)	−8 (17)	−1 (30)	5 (41)	10 (50)	13 (55)	12 (53)	7 (45)	1 (34)	−6 (21)	−13 (8)	−1 (30)
Average precipitation mm (inches)	23 (0.9)	23 (0.9)	43 (1.7)	64 (2.5)	97 (3.8)	100 (4.1)	100 (4.1)	100 (4)	71 (2.8)	48 (1.9)	33 (1.3)	66 (2.6)	790 (31.1)
Source: Weatherbase
