= Norwood, Wisconsin =

- Town
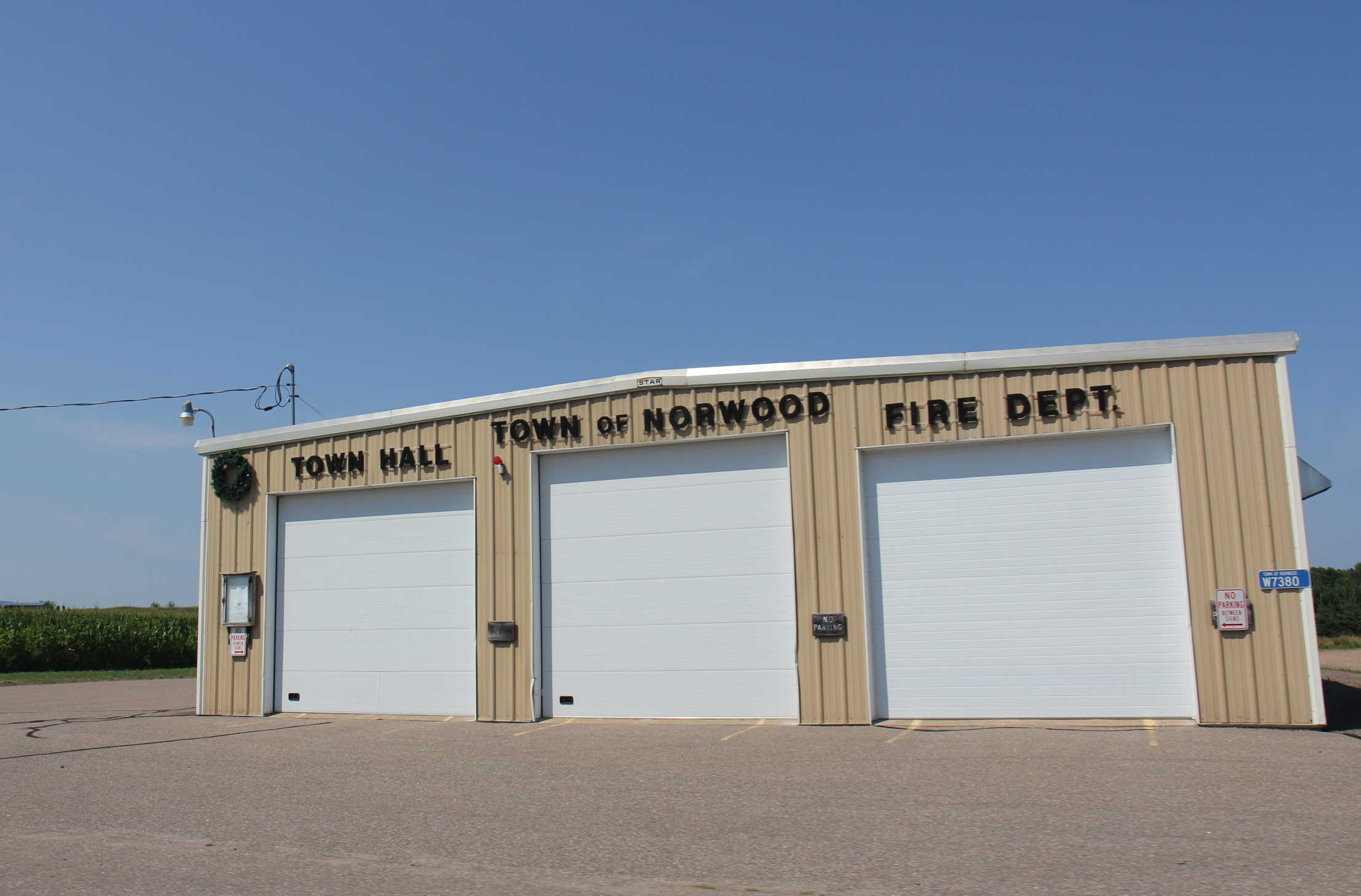
- The town hall and fire department

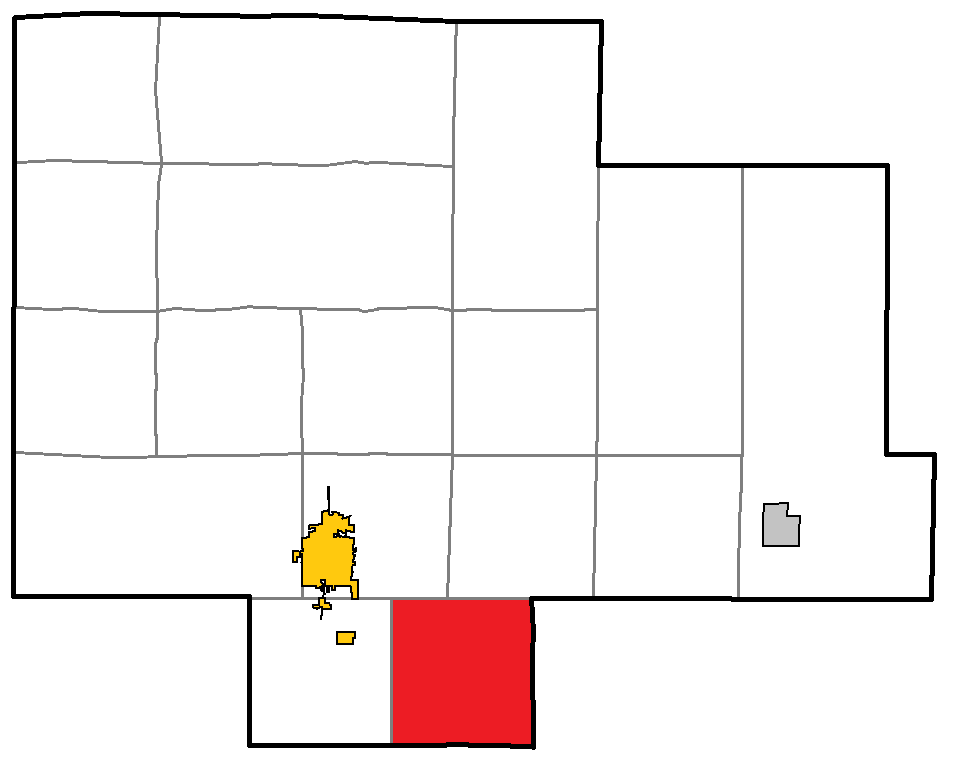
- Location of Norwood, within Langlade County
- Coordinates: 45°4′22″N 89°1′51″W
- Country: United States
- State: Wisconsin
- County: Langlade

Area
  - Total: 36.11 sq mi (93.53 km^{2})
  - Land: 35.56 sq mi (92.09 km^{2})
  - Water: 0.56 sq mi (1.44 km^{2})
- Elevation: 1,391 ft (424 m)

Population (2020)
  - Total: 907
  - Density: 25.5/sq mi (9.85/km^{2})
- Time zone: UTC-6 (Central (CST))
  - Summer (DST): UTC-5 (CDT)
- ZIP Code: 54409 (Antigo)
- Area codes: 715 & 534
- FIPS code: 55-067-58700
- GNIS feature ID: 1583834

Norwood is a town in Langlade County, Wisconsin, United States. The population was 907 at the 2020 census. The unincorporated community of Phlox is located in the town.

Visit the town website.

== Geography ==
Norwood is on the southern edge of Langlade County, bordered to the east by Menominee County and to the south by Shawano County. It is 12 miles (19 km) southeast of Antigo, the county seat.

According to the United States Census Bureau, the town of Norwood has a total area of 36.1 square miles (93.5 km^{2}), of which 35.6 square miles (92.1 km^{2}) are land and 0.54 square miles (1.4 km^{2}), or 1.54%, are water. The Red River, a tributary of the Wolf River, rises in the town and drains most of its area. The West Branch of the Red River crosses the southwestern corner of the town.

== Demographics ==
As of the census of 2000, there were 918 people, 332 households, and 252 families residing in the town. The population density was 25.7 people per square mile (9.9/km^{2}). There were 374 housing units at an average density of 10.5 per square mile (4/km^{2}). The racial makeup of the town was 97.39% White, 0.87% Native American, 0.22% Asian, and 1.53% from two or more races. Hispanic or Latino people of any race were 0.76% of the population.

There were 332 households, out of which 40.4% had children under the age of 18 living with them, 67.5% were married couples living together, 5.4% had a female householder with no husband present, and 23.8% were non-families. 19.3% of all households were made up of individuals, and 11.7% had someone living alone who was 65 years of age or older. The average household size was 2.77 and the average family size was 3.21.

In the town, the population was spread out, with 29.5% under the age of 18, 5.6% from 18 to 24, 28.8% from 25 to 44, 23.4% from 45 to 64, and 12.7% who were 65 years of age or older. The median age was 37 years. For every 100 females, there were 109.6 males. For every 100 females age 18 and over, there were 103.5 males.

The median income for a household in the town was $45,000, and the median income for a family was $50,750. Males had a median income of $31,938 versus $21,797 for females. The per capita income for the town was $17,893. About 4.5% of families and 6.7% of the population were below the poverty line, including 5.8% of those under age 18 and 16.8% of those age 65 or over.
