= Summit Lake, Wisconsin =

Census-designated place in Wisconsin, United States

- Census-designated place
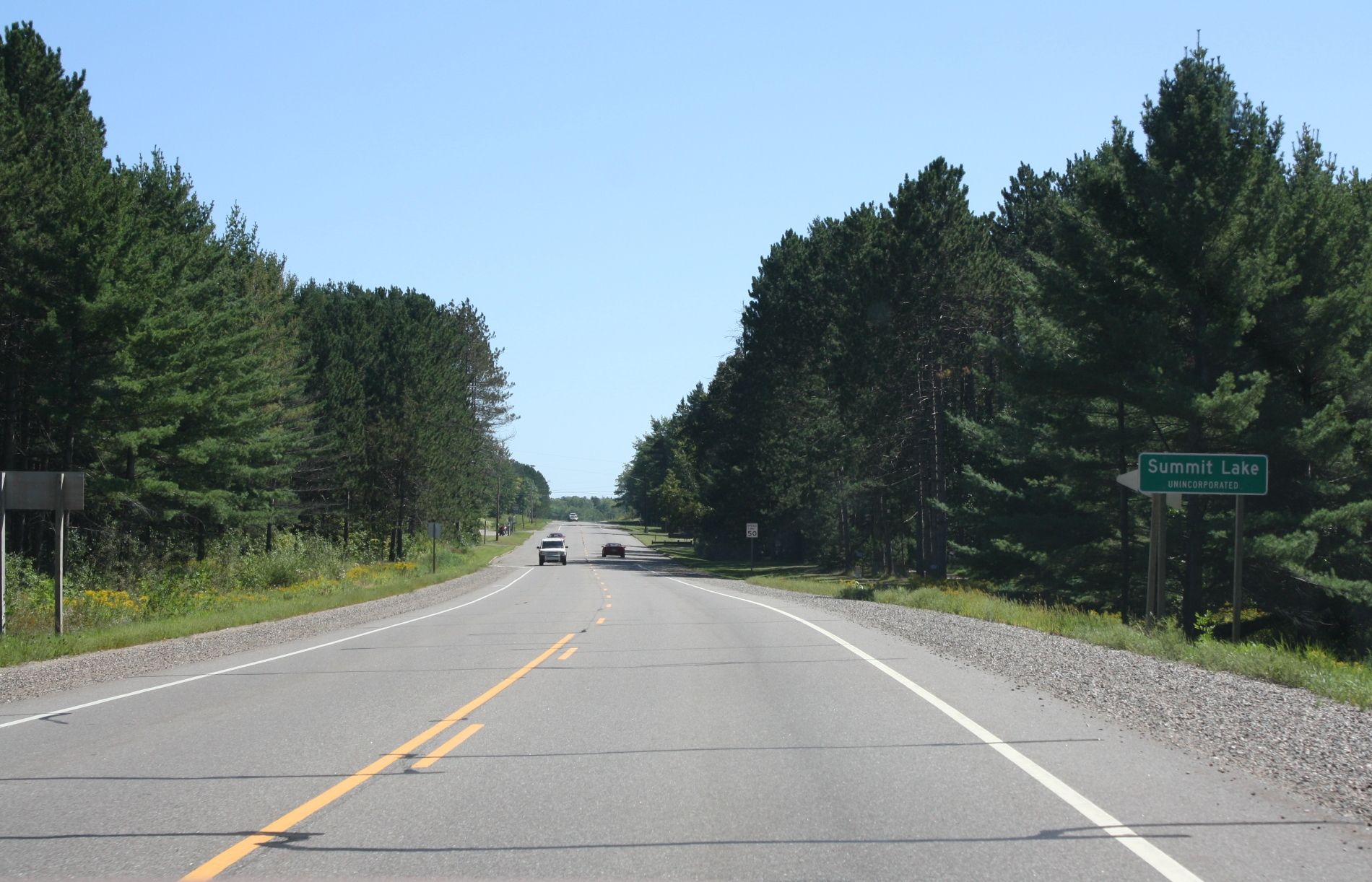
- Summit Lake sign on US 45

- Location within Wisconsin Location within the United States
- Coordinates: 45°22′40″N 89°11′41″W
- Country: United States
- State: Wisconsin
- County: Langlade
- Towns: Upham, Elcho

Area
  - Total: 1.209 sq mi (3.13 km^{2})
  - Land: 0.802 sq mi (2.08 km^{2})
  - Water: 0.437 sq mi (1.13 km^{2})
- Elevation: 1,722 ft (525 m)

Population (2020)
  - Total: 141
  - Density: 176/sq mi (67.9/km^{2})
- Time zone: UTC-6 (Central (CST))
  - Summer (DST): UTC-5 (CDT)
- ZIP code: 54485
- Area codes: 715 & 534
- GNIS feature ID: 1575061
- FIPS code: 55-78425

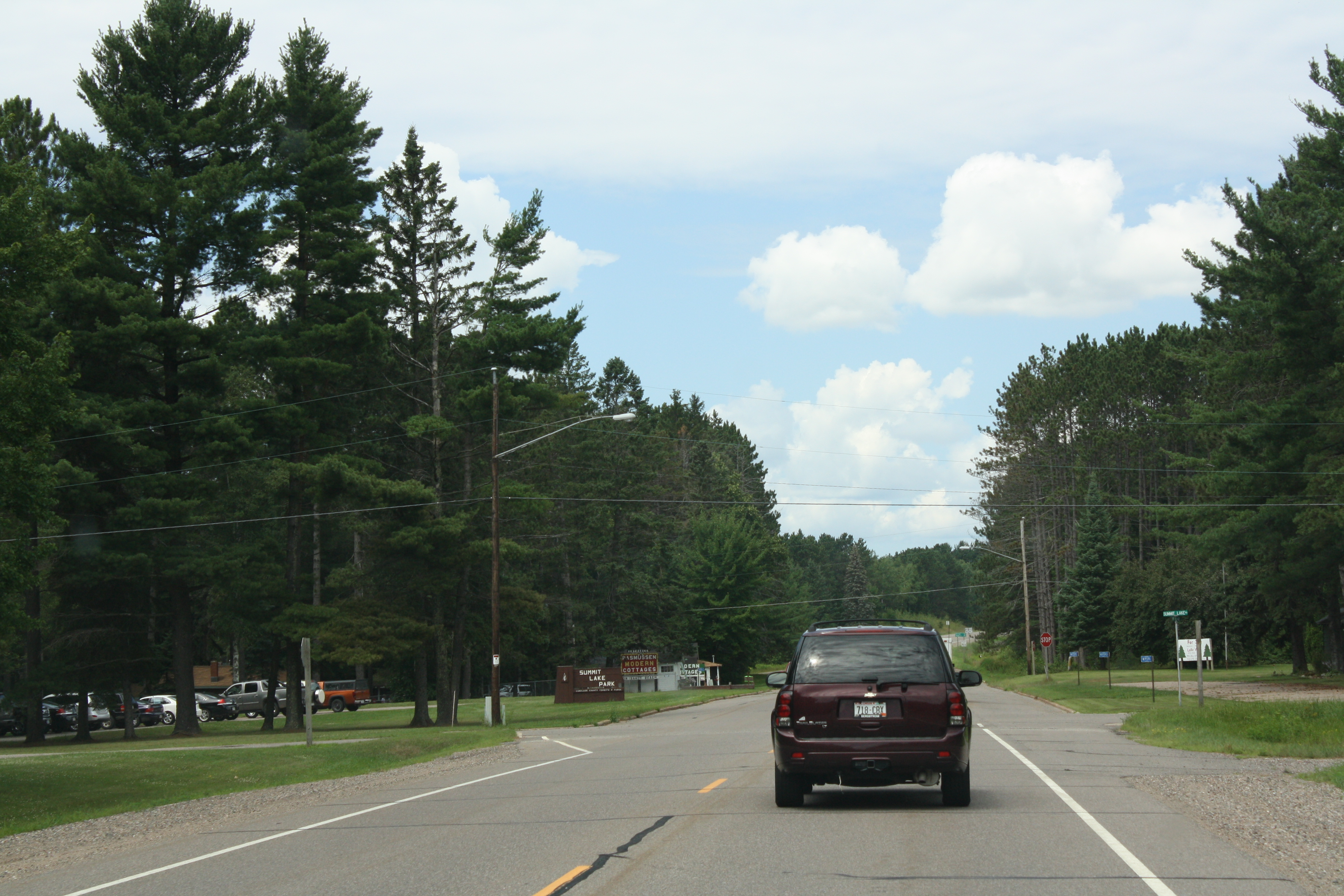
Looking north in Summit Lake

Summit Lake is an unincorporated community and census-designated place (CDP) in Langlade County, Wisconsin, United States. Summit Lake is located along U.S. Route 45, 17 miles (27 km) north of Antigo, in the towns of Upham and Elcho. Summit Lake has a post office with ZIP code 54485. As of the 2020 census its population was 141, a slight decrease of 144 at the 2010 census.

== History ==
A post office called Summit Lake has been in operation since 1882. The community took its name from nearby Summit Lake.
