= Antigo (town), Wisconsin =

Antigo, Wisconsin
- Town
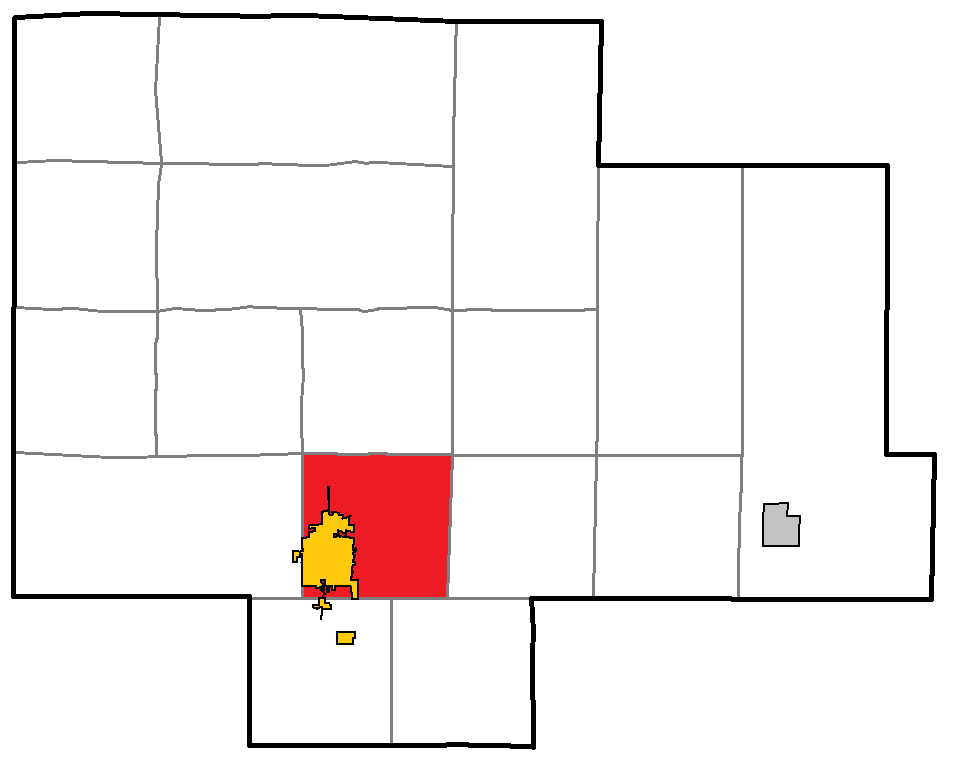
- Location of Antigo, within Langlade County
- Coordinates: 45°9′40″N 89°7′22″W
- Country: United States
- State: Wisconsin
- County: Langlade

Area
  - Total: 31.11 sq mi (80.57 km^{2})
  - Land: 31.06 sq mi (80.45 km^{2})
  - Water: 0.046 sq mi (0.12 km^{2})
- Elevation: 1,522 ft (464 m)

Population (2020)
  - Total: 1,369
  - Density: 44.07/sq mi (17.02/km^{2})
- Time zone: UTC-6 (Central (CST))
  - Summer (DST): UTC-5 (CDT)
- ZIP Code: 54409
- Area codes: 715 & 534
- FIPS code: 55-02275
- GNIS feature ID: 1582701

Antigo is a town in Langlade County, Wisconsin, United States. The population was 1,369 at the 2020 census. The town is bordered to the southwest by the city of Antigo, the Langlade county seat.

== Geography ==
Antigo is in southern Langlade County. According to the United States Census Bureau, the town has a total area of 31.1 square miles (80.6 km^{2}), of which 0.04 square miles (0.1 km^{2}), or 0.15%, are water. The town is primarily drained by Spring Brook, a southwest-flowing tributary of the Eau Claire River.

== Demographics ==
As of the census of 2000, there were 1,487 people, 550 households, and 452 families residing in the town. The population density was 47.9 people per square mile (18.5/km^{2}). There were 580 housing units at an average density of 18.7 per square mile (7.2/km^{2}). The racial makeup of the town was 98.05% White, 0.07% Black or African American, 0.27% Native American, 0.4% Asian, 0.07% Pacific Islander, 0.4% from other races, and 0.74% from two or more races. 0.67% of the population were Hispanic or Latino of any race.

There were 550 households, out of which 33.6% had children under the age of 18 living with them, 70.2% were married couples living together, 5.8% had a female householder with no husband present, and 17.8% were non-families. 14.2% of all households were made up of individuals, and 7.8% had someone living alone who was 65 years of age or older. The average household size was 2.7 and the average family size was 2.97.

In the town, the population was spread out, with 25.8% under the age of 18, 5.7% from 18 to 24, 25.1% from 25 to 44, 27.5% from 45 to 64, and 15.9% who were 65 years of age or older. The median age was 41 years. For every 100 females, there were 103.4 males. For every 100 females age 18 and over, there were 105 males.

The median income for a household in the town was $43,849, and the median income for a family was $46,307. Males had a median income of $30,762 versus $21,016 for females. The per capita income for the town was $18,445. About 8.7% of families and 10.5% of the population were below the poverty line, including 18.4% of those under age 18 and 5% of those age 65 or over.
