= Civil parish (disambiguation) =

A civil parish is an administrative division in England, the lowest tier of local government.

Civil parish may also refer to :

- Civil parishes in Ireland, territorial units in the Republic of Ireland and Northern Ireland, which though not abolished are essentially obsolete.
- Civil parishes in Scotland, former units of local government in Scotland, replaced by communities
- Civil parishes in Wales, former units of local government in Wales, replaced by communities
- Civil parishes of local government in Canada are in some provinces sub-county level divisions.
- Civil parishes in Portugal (subdivisions of municipalities) are known as freguesias

== See also ==
- Parish (administrative division)
- Parish (disambiguation)
