= White Lake, Wisconsin =

White Lake
- Village
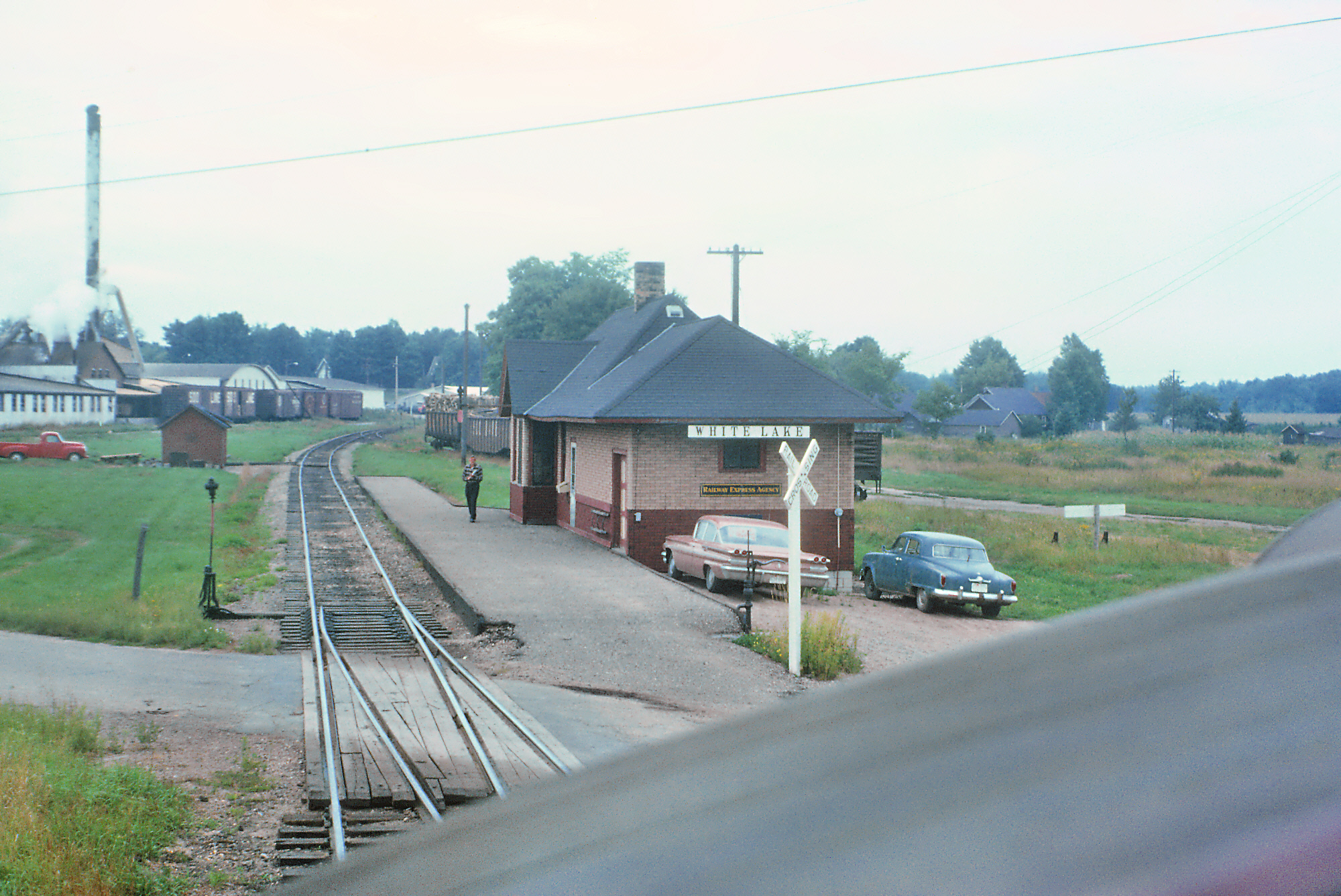
- Station at White Lake in September 1963

- Location of White Lake in Langlade County, Wisconsin

- Location within the United States
- Coordinates: 45°9′24″N 88°45′56″W
- Country: United States
- State: Wisconsin
- County: Langlade

Area
  - Total: 2.39 sq mi (6.19 km^{2})
  - Land: 2.10 sq mi (5.44 km^{2})
  - Water: 0.29 sq mi (0.75 km^{2}) 11.74%
- Elevation: 1,286.000 ft (391.9728 m)

Population (2020)
  - Total: 262
  - Density: 125/sq mi (48.2/km^{2})
- Time zone: UTC-6 (CST)
  - Summer (DST): UTC-5 (CDT)
- Zip Code: 54491
- Area codes: 715 & 534
- FIPS code: 55-86750
- GNIS feature ID: 1580775
- Website: https://villageofwhitelake.com/

White Lake is a village in Langlade County, Wisconsin, United States. The population was 262 at the 2020 census.

The White Lake Volunteer Fire Department is located within the village.

== History ==
The name "White" was given to the lake by the Native Americans who hunted and fished in the area many years ago. It was so named because of the white sand and marl in the lake bottom. In 1876, pioneer Isaac Farrow attempted to drain White Lake and make a hay meadow out of the level bottom. He failed in this venture because he did not realize the depth of the lake and the fact that it was fed by springs.

The White Lake area lies south and west of a former terminus of the Wisconsin and Northern Railroad, Van Ostrand. Service began running between Shawano and Van Ostrand in late 1907. Settlement in the area began to show preference to the White Lake area over Van Ostrand, a process that was accelerated by the construction of a new lumber mill completed at the end of 1916. The Wisconsin Northern moved its depot from Van Ostrand to White Lake at approximately that time. Van Ostrand was ultimately abandoned, while White Lake was incorporated as a village in 1926.

A post office called White Lake was established in 1916, and has remained in operation ever since.

== Geography ==
White Lake is located at 45°9′24″N 88°45′56″W (45.156596, -88.765597), in the eastern part of Langlade County, approximately four miles west of the Wolf River and Wisconsin Highway 55. It is surrounded by the Town of Wolf River.

According to the United States Census Bureau, the village has a total area of 2.47 square miles (6.40 km^{2}), of which 2.18 square miles (5.65 km^{2}) is land and 0.29 square miles (0.75 km^{2}) is water.

== Demographics ==
Historical population
Census	Pop.	Note	%±
1930	530		—
1940	548		3.4%
1950	408		−25.5%
1960	325		−20.3%
1970	309		−4.9%
1980	309		0.0%
1990	304		−1.6%
2000	329		8.2%
2010	363		10.3%
2020	262		−27.8%
U.S. Decennial Census

=== 2010 census ===
As of the census of 2010, there were 363 people, 156 households, and 100 families living in the village. The population density was 166.5 inhabitants per square mile (64.3/km^{2}). There were 212 housing units at an average density of 97.2 per square mile (37.5/km^{2}). The racial makeup of the village was 96.4% White, 0.3% Asian, and 3.3% from two or more races. Hispanic or Latino people of any race were 2.5% of the population.

There were 156 households, of which 28.8% had children under the age of 18 living with them, 40.4% were married couples living together, 16.7% had a female householder with no husband present, 7.1% had a male householder with no wife present, and 35.9% were non-families. 30.8% of all households were made up of individuals, and 16% had someone living alone who was 65 years of age or older. The average household size was 2.33 and the average family size was 2.87.

The median age in the village was 44.8 years. 24.8% of residents were under the age of 18; 7.8% were between the ages of 18 and 24; 17.9% were from 25 to 44; 26.9% were from 45 to 64; and 22.6% were 65 years of age or older. The gender makeup of the village was 47.4% male and 52.6% female.

=== 2000 census ===
As of the census of 2000, there were 329 people, 136 households, and 96 families living in the village. According to the posted population sign, White Lake currently has 375 people. The population density was 149.2 people per square mile (57.7/km^{2}). There were 184 housing units at an average density of 83.5 per square mile (32.3/km^{2}). The racial makeup of the village was 96.66% White, 0.3% Asian, 1.82% from other races, and 1.22% from two or more races. Hispanic or Latino people of any race were 2.13% of the population.

There were 136 households, out of which 34.6% had children under the age of 18 living with them, 53.7% were married couples living together, 13.2% had a female householder with no husband present, and 29.4% were non-families. 25% of all households were made up of individuals, and 11% had someone living alone who was 65 years of age or older. The average household size was 2.42 and the average family size was 2.92.

In the village, the population was spread out, with 27.4% under the age of 18, 4.6% from 18 to 24, 23.1% from 25 to 44, 24.3% from 45 to 64, and 20.7% who were 65 years of age or older. The median age was 41 years. For every 100 females, there were 100.6 males. For every 100 females age 18 and over, there were 92.7 males.

The median income for a household in the village was $29,722, and the median income for a family was $32,500. Males had a median income of $26,964 versus $24,688 for females. The per capita income for the village was $16,768. About 8.8% of families and 13.4% of the population were below the poverty line, including 29.4% of those under age 18 and 3.6% of those age 65 or over.
