= Langlade County Airport =

Airport in Antigo, Wisconsin

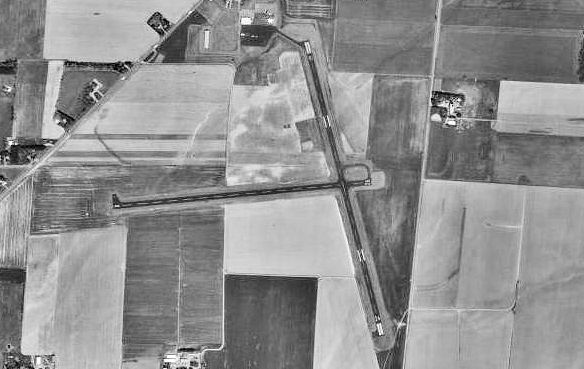
- 1998 USGS photo
- IATA: none; ICAO: KAIG; FAA LID: AIG

Summary
- Airport type: Public
- Owner/Operator: Langlade County
- Location: Town of Antigo, Wisconsin
- Opened: October 1944
- Time zone: CST (UTC−06:00)
  - Summer (DST): CDT (UTC−05:00)
- Elevation AMSL: 1,523 ft (464 m)
- Coordinates: 45°09′14″N 89°06′38″W

Map
- Location of airport in Wisconsin AIG (the United States)

Runways
Direction	Length		Surface
Direction	ft	m	Surface
17/35	4,010	1,220	Asphalt
9/27	3,400	1,036	Asphalt

Statistics
- Aircraft operations (2023): 8,250
- Based aircraft (2024): 20
- Source: Federal Aviation Administration

Langlade County Airport (ICAO: KAIG, FAA LID: AIG) is a county-owned public-use airport located two nautical miles (4 km) northeast of the central business district of Antigo, a city in Langlade County, Wisconsin, United States. It is included in the Federal Aviation Administration (FAA) National Plan of Integrated Airport Systems for 2025–2029, in which it is categorized as a local general aviation facility.

Although most U.S. airports use the same three-letter location identifier for the FAA and IATA, this airport is assigned AIG by the FAA but has no designation from the IATA (which assigned AIG to Yalinga in the Central African Republic).

== History ==
The facility was used by the United States Army Air Forces as a contract glider training airfield, known as Antigo Airport. Anderson Air Activities provided preliminary glider training. The school was one of 18 private operator contract schools that ran for 90 days beginning approximately July 6, 1942. There were but a few two place soaring gliders available for training. The Army delivered a few single engine, L type aircraft to be used. The primary training in these aircraft involved so called "dead-stick" landings. The student and instructor flew to various prescribed altitudes up to 5,000 feet (1,500 m) and the engine was shut off. The student then landed the plane as a glider.

By September 1942, the Southeast Air Forces Training Command had been instructed to shut down the school as the shortage of gliders and single engine aircraft did not allow the school to train and produce the number of students required by the USAAF. Antigo Airport was closed, the Army flew the planes out and the land was returned to the local farmers.

== Facilities and aircraft ==
Langlade County Airport covers an area of 440 acres (180 ha) at an elevation of 1,523 feet (464 m) above mean sea level. It has two asphalt paved runways: the primary runway 17/35 is 4,010 by 75 feet (1,220 x 23 m); and the crosswind runway 9/27 is 3,400 by 75 feet (1,036 x 23 m). Both runways have approved GPS approaches. The Antigo NDB navaid, (AIG) frequency 347 kHz, is located on the field.

For the 12-month period ending August 10, 2023, the airport had 8,250 aircraft operations, an average of 23 per day: roughly 97% general aviation, 2% air taxi and 1% military. In July 2024, there were 20 aircraft based at this airport: 19 single-engine and 1 jet.

Walker Aviation LLC is the fixed-base operator.

In March 2008, the Governor of Wisconsin approved plans to construct a new T-hangar for nearly $400,000 with the Federal Aviation Administration providing the bulk of the funding.

== Incidents ==
- Two people were killed on December 9, 1993, when their Piper PA-32R-300 crashed while attempting to land during IFR weather conditions.

== See also ==
- List of airports in Wisconsin
- Wisconsin World War II Army Airfields
- 29th Flying Training Wing (World War II)
