= Summit, Langlade County, Wisconsin =

Summit, Wisconsin
- Town
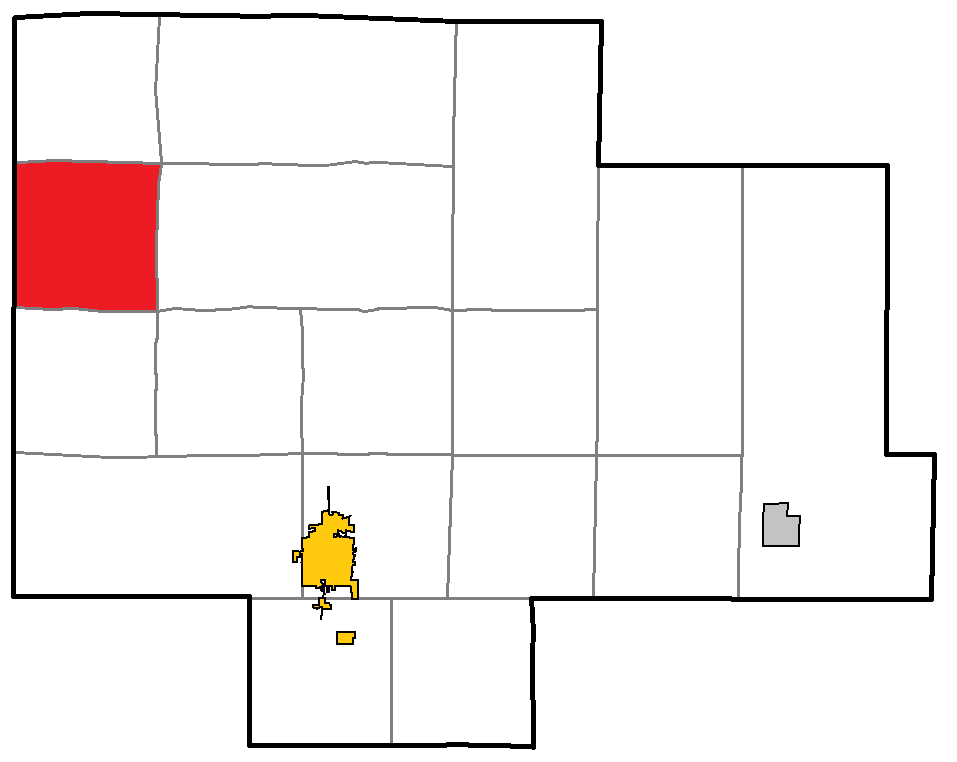
- Location of Summit, within Langlade County
- Coordinates: 45°21′16″N 89°21′8″W
- Country: United States
- State: Wisconsin
- County: Langlade

Area
  - Total: 36.3 sq mi (94.1 km^{2})
  - Land: 36.31 sq mi (94.04 km^{2})
  - Water: 0.023 sq mi (0.06 km^{2})
- Elevation: 1,588 ft (484 m)

Population (2020)
  - Total: 143
  - Density: 3.94/sq mi (1.52/km^{2})
- Time zone: UTC-6 (Central (CST))
  - Summer (DST): UTC-5 (CDT)
- ZIP Code: 54435 (Gleason)
- Area codes: 715 & 534
- FIPS code: 55-78325
- GNIS feature ID: 1584249

Summit is a town in Langlade County, Wisconsin, United States. The population was 143 at the 2020 census. The unincorporated community of Bavaria is located in the town. The town established a post office in 1905. The post office was discontinued in late 1921.

== Geography ==
Summit is in western Langlade County, bordered to the west by Lincoln County. The town is sparsely settled and mostly forested. According to the United States Census Bureau, the town has a total area of 36.3 square miles (94.1 km^{2}), of which 0.02 square miles (0.06 km^{2}), or 0.07%, are water.

== Demographics ==
As of the census of 2000, there were 168 people, 66 households, and 51 families residing in the town. The population density was 4.6 people per square mile (1.8/km^{2}). There were 142 housing units at an average density of 3.9 per square mile (1.5/km^{2}). The racial makeup of the town was 97.02% White, 1.19% Asian, 0.6% Pacific Islander, and 1.19% from two or more races.

There were 66 households, out of which 25.8% had children under the age of 18 living with them, 63.6% were married couples living together, 7.6% had a female householder with no husband present, and 22.7% were non-families. 22.7% of all households were made up of individuals, and 9.1% had someone living alone who was 65 years of age or older. The average household size was 2.55 and the average family size was 2.96.

In the town, the population was spread out, with 24.4% under the age of 18, 7.1% from 18 to 24, 25% from 25 to 44, 25.6% from 45 to 64, and 17.9% who were 65 years of age or older. The median age was 42 years. For every 100 females, there were 133.3 males. For every 100 females age 18 and over, there were 135.2 males.

The median income for a household in the town was $29,375, and the median income for a family was $33,125. Males had a median income of $25,875 versus $23,438 for females. The per capita income for the town was $14,794. About 9.8% of families and 17.9% of the population were below the poverty line, including 32.1% of those under the age of eighteen and 8.3% of those 65 or over.
