= Hollister, Wisconsin =

- Unincorporated community
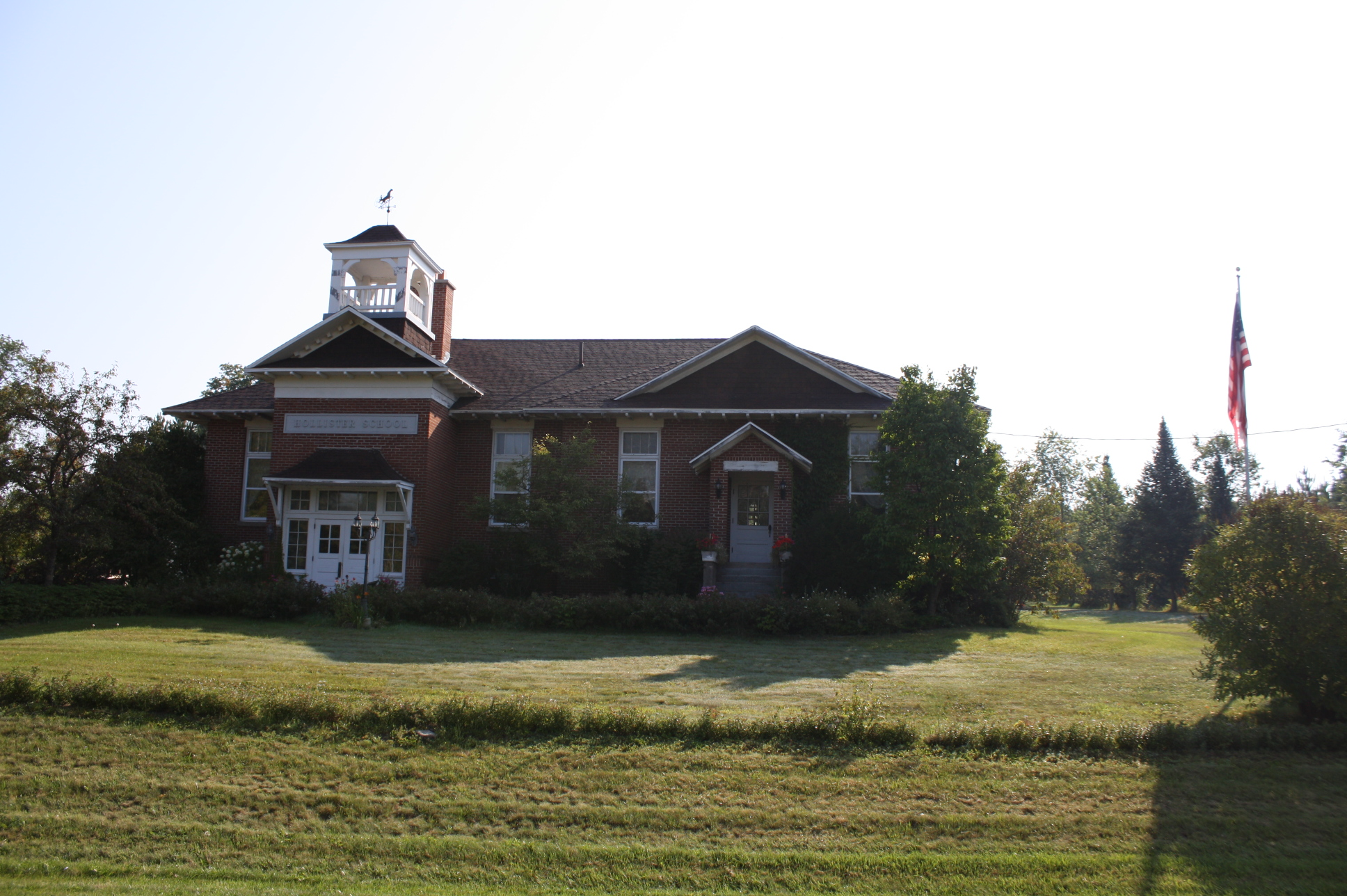
- Hollister School

- Location within Wisconsin Location within the United States
- Coordinates: 45°14′53″N 88°47′29″W
- Country: United States
- State: Wisconsin
- County: Langlade
- Town: Wolf River
- Elevation: 1,381 ft (421 m)
- Time zone: UTC-6 (Central (CST))
  - Summer (DST): UTC-5 (CDT)
- Area codes: 715 & 534
- GNIS feature ID: 1579470

Hollister is an unincorporated community located in the town of Wolf River, in Langlade County, Wisconsin, United States. The community is located on Wisconsin Highway 55. The village is named after Seymour W. Hollister, an Oshkosh lumberman and a partner in the Choate-Hollister Furniture Co. Hollister is served by the Wolf River Volunteer Fire Department, and City of Antigo EMS. The town established a post office in 1923, which was discontinued in 1961.
