= Koepenick, Wisconsin =

- Unincorporated community
- Location within Wisconsin Location within the United States
- Coordinates: 45°20′12″N 89°10′00″W
- Country: United States
- State: Wisconsin
- County: Langlade
- Town: Upham
- Elevation: 1,693 ft (516 m)
- Time zone: UTC-6 (Central (CST))
  - Summer (DST): UTC-5 (CDT)
- Area codes: 715 & 534
- GNIS feature ID: 1577683

Koepenick is an unincorporated community located in the town of Upham, Langlade County, Wisconsin, United States. Koepenick is located on County Highway B, 13.5 miles (21.7 km) north of Antigo.

== History ==
A post office called Koepenick was established in 1890, and remained in operation until it was discontinued in 1925. The community was named for E. S. Koepenick, an early settler and owner of a local sawmill.
