= Elmhurst, Wisconsin =

- Unincorporated community
- Location within Wisconsin Location within the United States
- Coordinates: 45°3′12″N 89°11′20″W
- Country: United States
- State: Wisconsin
- County: Langlade
- Town: Rolling
- Time zone: UTC-6 (Central (CST))
  - Summer (DST): UTC-5 (CDT)
- Area codes: 715 & 534

Elmhurst is an unincorporated community in Langlade County, Wisconsin, United States. It is in the town of Rolling at latitude 45°3'30" North, longitude 89°11'3" West. The community is located near the headwaters of the Middle Branch Embarrass River, approximately 1½ miles west of the junction of WIS 47, WIS 52 and U.S. Highway 45 in the Town of Rolling. A track of the Chicago and North Western Railway runs along the west side of the community. Elmhurst is located at 1,476 feet (450 m) above sea level.

== History ==
A post office called Elmhurst was established in 1881, and remained in operation until it was discontinued in 1928. The community was named after Elmhurst, Illinois.
