= Parrish Creek =

- Etymology: Samuel Parrish

Location
- Country: United States

Physical characteristics
- Source
  - location: Spring in the Wasatch Range, Utah
  - coordinates: 40°56′48″N 111°48′30″W
  - elevation: 8,580 feet (2,620 m)
- Mouth
  - location: Centerville, Utah
  - coordinates: 40°55′24″N 111°51′56″W
  - elevation: 4,600 feet (1,400 m)

Basin features
- River system: Parrish Canyon

Parrish Creek is a stream in Davis County, Utah, United States.

The creek begins at a spring about 1.3 miles (2.1 km) south-southeast of Bountiful Peak in the Wasatch Range at an elevation of approximately 8,580 feet (2,620 m). It flows southwest to a point in the foothills northeast of the eastern end of Parrish Lane (400 North) in Centerville.

Parrish Creek was named after Samuel Parrish, a pioneer settler in the area. The creek and the community had originally been named Duel, after a pair brothers that were settlers in the area. (However, the name of the community was later changed to Cherry Creek, and then Centerville, while the name of the creek was changed to Parrish.) After settling along the steam. Mr. Parrish built one of the first (albeit crude) mills in Davis County.

A short way up a trail that roughly follows the stream bed there are some Native American pictographs. There is another trail that runs south of the creek (along the ridge which separates Parrish Canyon from Centerville Canyon) that is one of the recommended hiking routes to Bountiful Peak. The west end of that trail begins along the Bonneville Shoreline Trail, and the east end connects with Skyline Drive. The trail (to the peak) is about 7.84 miles (12.62 km) with an elevation gain of 4,670 feet (1,420 m).

== See also ==
- List of rivers of Utah
- Wasatch Front
