= Langlade County Courthouse =

- U.S. National Register of Historic Places
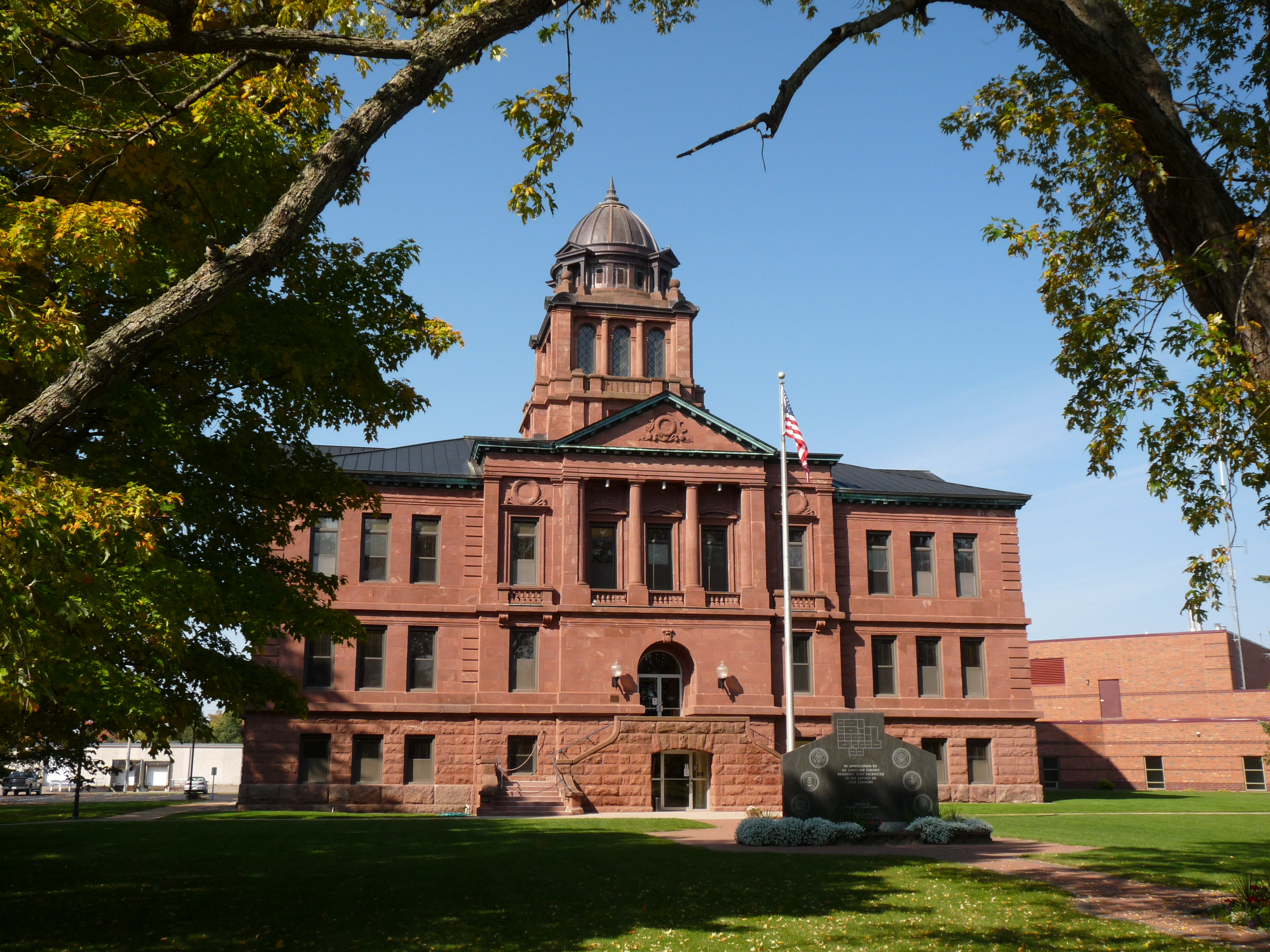

- Location within Wisconsin Location within the United States
- Interactive map showing the location of Langlade County Courthouse
- Location: 800 Clermont St., Antigo, Wisconsin
- Coordinates: 45°8′38″N 89°9′18″W
- Area: 4.4 acres (1.8 ha)
- Built: 1905
- Architect: Kinney & Detweiler
- Artist (murals): Axel E. Soderberg
- Architectural style: Classical Revival
- NRHP reference No.: 77000034
- Added to NRHP: July 25, 1977

The Langlade County Courthouse is Langlade County, Wisconsin's historic courthouse, located in Antigo, the county seat. The courthouse was built in 1905 by the architectural firm Kinney & Detweiler, replacing the first courthouse, which was built in 1882. The building was built in the Classical Revival style and includes murals by Swedish artist Axel E. Soderberg. In 2000, a glass addition was put on the building. The courthouse was added to the National Register of Historic Places on July 25, 1977.
