= Parrish, Wisconsin =

- Town
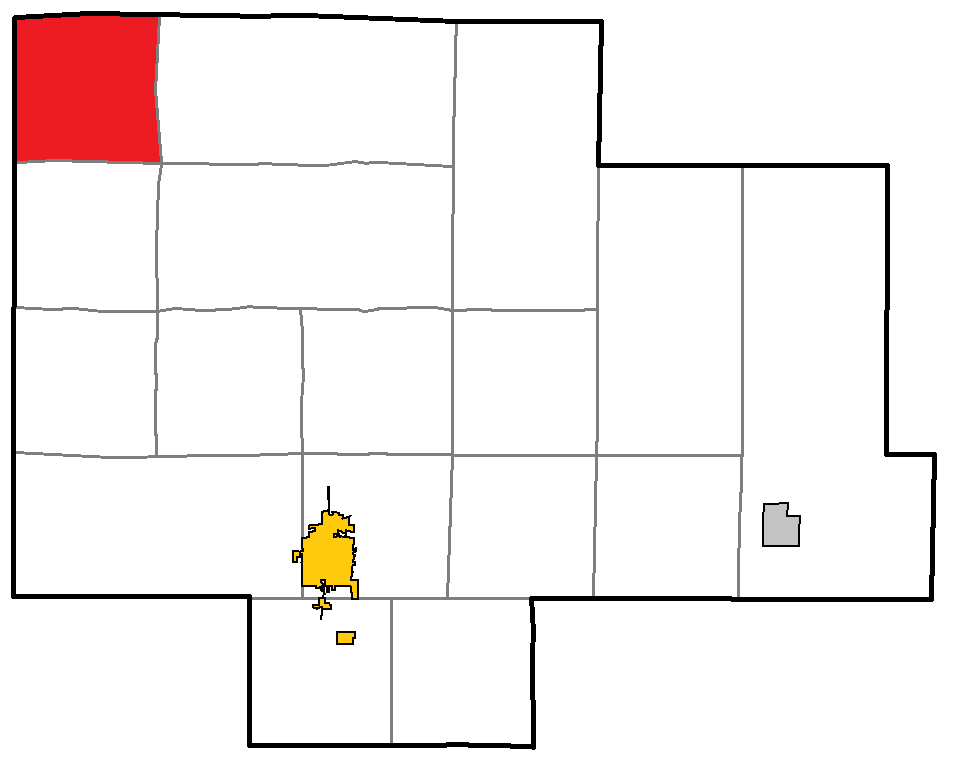
- Location of Parrish, within Langlade County
- Coordinates: 45°25′43″N 89°23′6″W
- Country: United States
- State: Wisconsin
- County: Langlade

Area
  - Total: 36.47 sq mi (94.45 km^{2})
  - Land: 36.11 sq mi (93.53 km^{2})
  - Water: 0.36 sq mi (0.92 km^{2})
- Elevation: 1,660 ft (506 m)

Population (2020)
  - Total: 91
  - Density: 2.5/sq mi (0.97/km^{2})
- Time zone: UTC-6 (Central (CST))
  - Summer (DST): UTC-5 (CDT)
- ZIP Code: 54435 (Gleason)
- Area codes: 715 & 534
- FIPS code: 55-067-61375
- GNIS feature ID: 1583898

Parrish is a town in Langlade County, Wisconsin, United States. The population was 91 at the 2020 census, no change from the 2010 census. The unincorporated community of Parrish is located in the town.

== Geography ==
Parrish occupies the northwestern corner of Langlade County; it is bordered to the north by Oneida County and to the west by Lincoln County. According to the United States Census Bureau, the town has a total area of 36.5 square miles (94.5 km^{2}), of which 36.1 square miles (93.5 km^{2}) are land and 0.3 square miles (0.9 km^{2}), or 0.98%, are water. The town is drained by the westward-flowing Prairie River, a tributary of the Wisconsin River.

== Demographics ==
As of the census of 2000, there were 108 people, 41 households, and 35 families residing in the town. The population density was 3 people per square mile (1.1/km^{2}). There were 92 housing units at an average density of 2.5 per square mile (1/km^{2}). The racial makeup of the town was 88.89% White and 11.11% Asian.

There were 41 households, out of which 22% had children under the age of 18 living with them, 70.7% were married couples living together, 7.3% had a female householder with no husband present, and 14.6% were non-families. 9.8% of all households were made up of individuals, and 2.4% had someone living alone who was 65 years of age or older. The average household size was 2.63 and the average family size was 2.77.

In the town, the population was spread out, with 22.2% under the age of 18, 6.5% from 18 to 24, 24.1% from 25 to 44, 25.9% from 45 to 64, and 21.3% who were 65 years of age or older. The median age was 42 years. For every 100 females, there were 92.9 males. For every 100 females age 18 and over, there were 100.0 males.

The median income for a household in the town was $40,625, and the median income for a family was $40,833. Males had a median income of $31,000 versus $21,250 for females. The per capita income for the town was $18,645. There were 6.3% of families and 4.7% of the population living below the poverty line, including no under-eighteens and 16.7% of those over 64.
