= Parrish (community), Wisconsin =

Parrish, Wisconsin
- Unincorporated community
- Location within Wisconsin Location within the United States
- Coordinates: 45°25′11″N 89°24′09″W
- Country: United States
- State: Wisconsin
- County: Langlade
- Town: Parrish
- Elevation: 1,601 ft (488 m)
- Time zone: UTC-6 (Central (CST))
  - Summer (DST): UTC-5 (CDT)
- Area codes: 715 & 534
- GNIS feature ID: 1571065

Parrish is an unincorporated community located in the town of Parrish, Langlade County, Wisconsin, United States. Parrish is located near Wisconsin Highway 17, 15 miles (24 km) south of Rhinelander.

== History ==
A post office called Parrish was established in 1889, and remained in operation until it was discontinued in 1963. Parrish was named for a railroad official.
