= Van Ostrand, Wisconsin =

Ghost town in Landglade County, Wisconsin

Van Ostrand is a ghost town in Langlade County, Wisconsin.

A railroad began service between Shawano and Van Ostrand in 1907. People began to move to White Lake and leave Van Ostrand. It was accelerated by the new lumber mill built in White Lake. The Wisconsin Northern moved its depot from Van Ostrand to White Lake at approximately that time. Van Ostrand was abandoned after the railroad was removed.
