= Langlade (community), Wisconsin =

Langlade, Wisconsin
- Unincorporated community
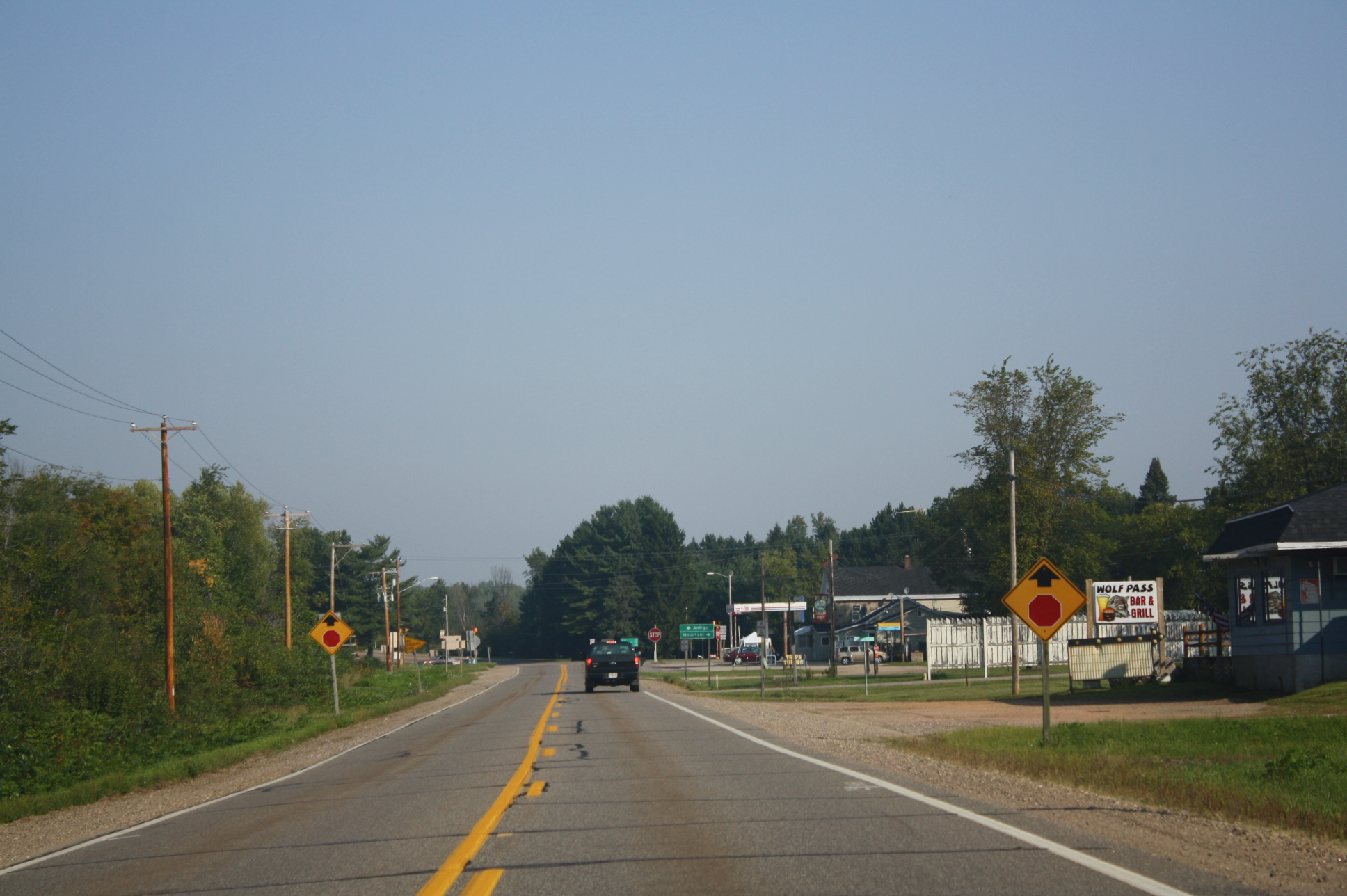
- Looking north at downtown Langlade on WIS 55

- Location within Wisconsin Location within the United States
- Country: United States
- State: Wisconsin
- County: Langlade
- Town: Wolf River
- Time zone: UTC-6 (Central (CST))
  - Summer (DST): UTC-5 (CDT)
- Area codes: 715 & 534
- GNIS feature ID: 1579627

Langlade is an unincorporated community located in the town of Wolf River in Langlade County, Wisconsin, United States. It is located at the intersection of state highways 55 and 64. The Langlade post office was established in June 1873 by its first postmaster, Charles H. Lazelere. The post office was later discontinued in 1915. The community is named for Charles Michel de Langlade, who established a trading post in the 1740s.
