= Eau Claire River (Wisconsin River tributary) =

River in north central Wisconsin

Eau Claire River Wah-yaw-oon-ut-ta-gua-yaw Se-be (Ojibwe)
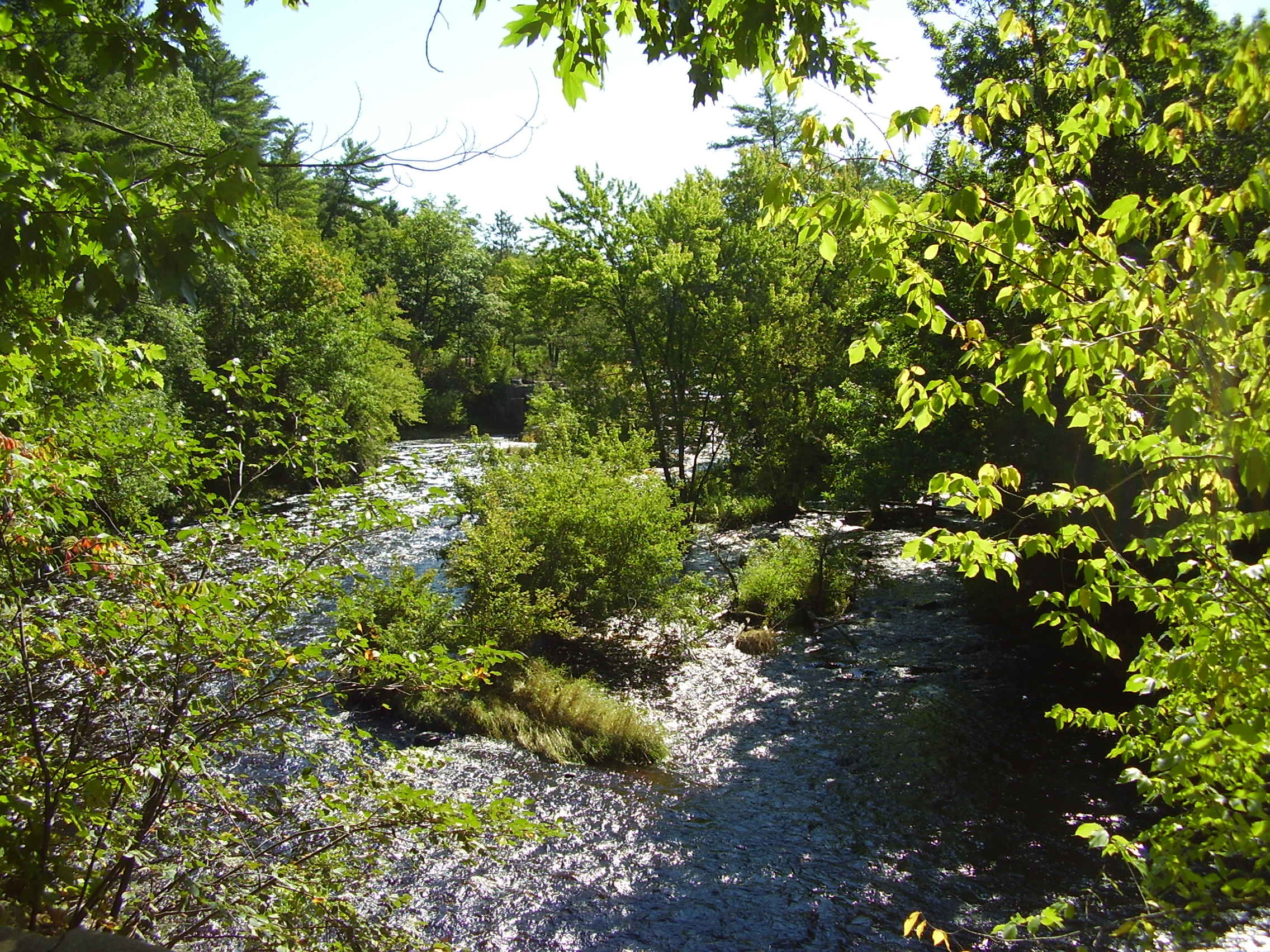
- Eau Claire River downstream from the dells

Physical characteristics
- Source
  - location: Langlade County, Wisconsin
  - coordinates: 45.140800°N 89.240670°W
- Mouth
  - location: Wausau, Wisconsin
  - coordinates: 44.915246°N 89.613455°W
  - elevation: 1,161 feet (354 m)

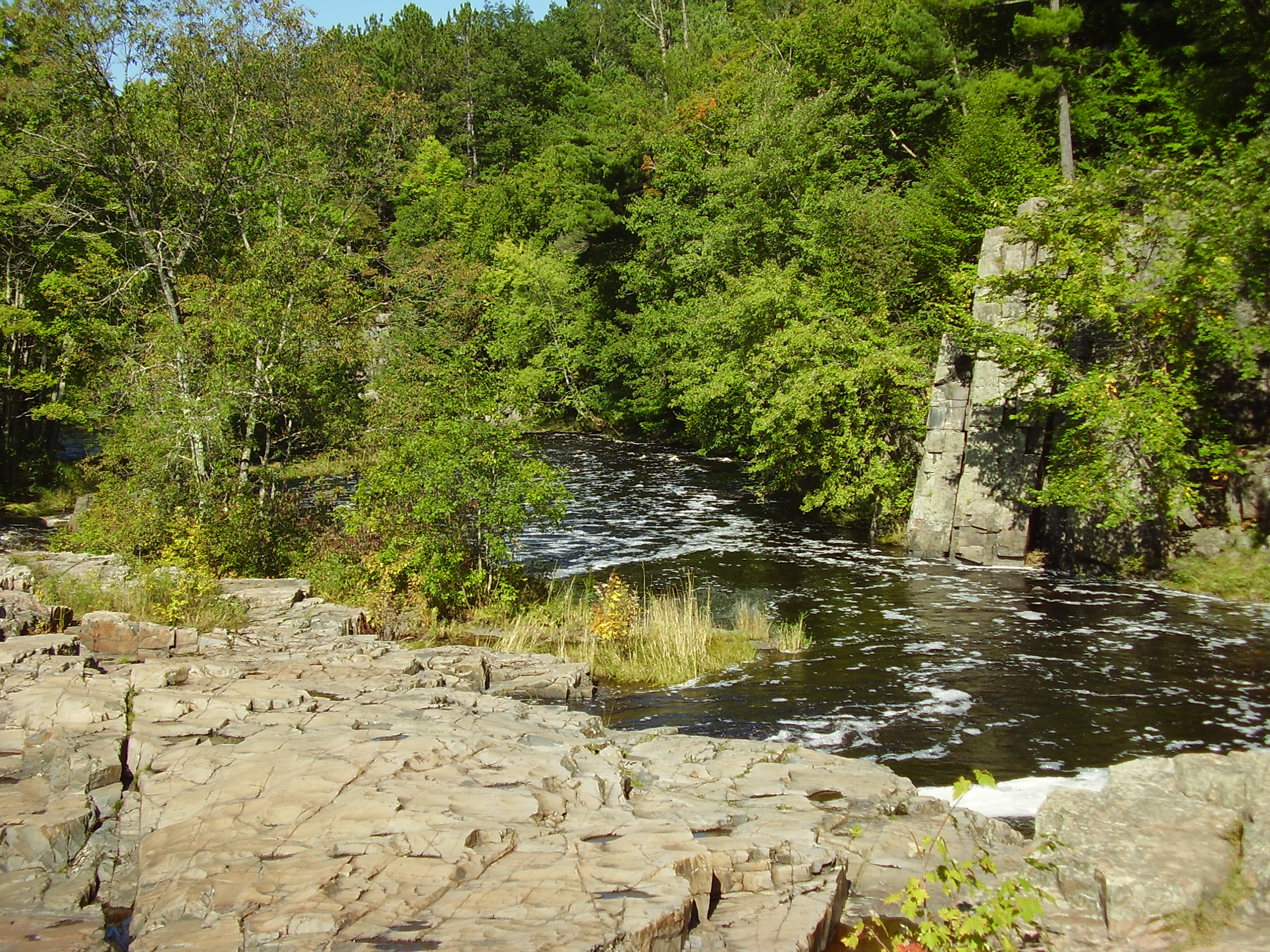
Eau Claire Dells

The Eau Claire River is a river in the U.S. state of Wisconsin. It is a tributary of the Wisconsin River. The Eau Claire River originates in western Langlade County and flows into Marathon County.

The Eau Claire River flows through "Dells of the Eau Claire" then to Wausau before it converges into the Wisconsin River just north of Schofield.
