= Langlade County, Wisconsin =

County in Wisconsin, United States

- County
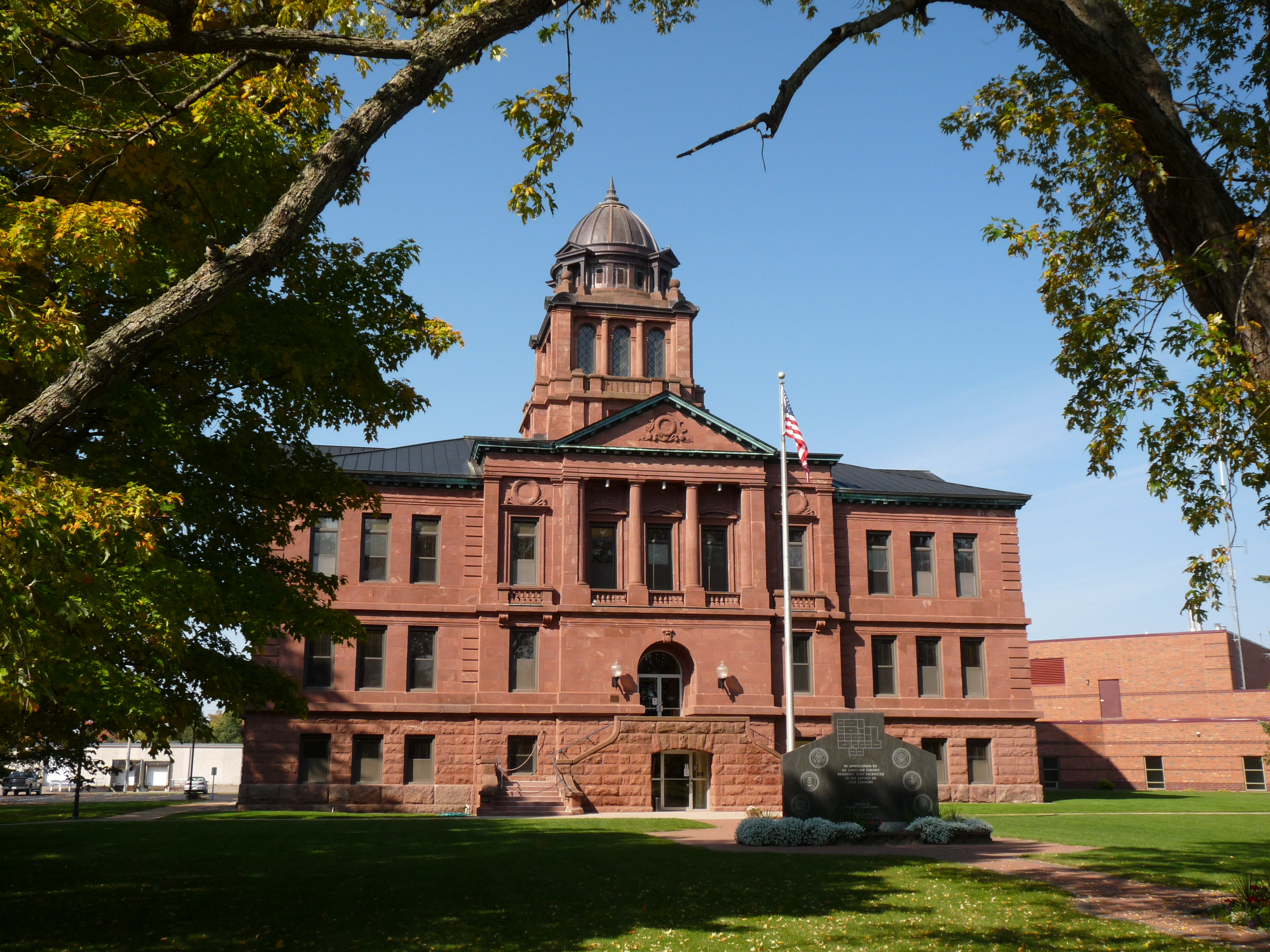
- Langlade County Courthouse in 2014

- Logo

- Location within the U.S. state of Wisconsin
- Coordinates: 45°13′00″N 89°00′00″W
- Country: United States
- State: Wisconsin
- Created: March 3, 1879
- Named for: Charles Michel de Langlade
- Seat: Antigo
- Largest city: Antigo

Area
  - Total: 888 sq mi (2,300 km^{2})
  - Land: 871 sq mi (2,260 km^{2})
  - Water: 17 sq mi (44 km^{2}) 1.9%

Population (2020)
  - Total: 19,491
  - Estimate (2025): 19,534 ▲
  - Density: 22.4/sq mi (8.6/km^{2})
- Time zone: UTC−6 (Central)
  - Summer (DST): UTC−5 (CDT)
- Congressional district: 7th
- Website: www.co.langlade.wi.us

Langlade County is a county located in the U.S. state of Wisconsin. As of the 2020 census, the population was 19,491. Its county seat is Antigo.

== History ==
Langlade County was created on March 3, 1879, as New County. It was renamed Langlade County, in honor of Charles de Langlade, on February 20, 1880, and fully organized on February 19, 1881. The county's original borders extended northward from the top of Shawano County up to the Michigan state line. Between 1881 and 1885, the borders of Langlade County changed as nearby Lincoln and Shawano counties added or gave up area. Langlade lost its northernmost area along the Michigan border to Forest County when it was created in 1885.

== Geography ==
According to the U.S. Census Bureau, the county has a total area of 888 square miles (2,300 km^{2}), of which 871 square miles (2,260 km^{2}) is land and 17 square miles (44 km^{2}) (1.9%) is water. The highest point in the county is at the foot of the Basswood Lookout Tower, west of Summit Lake (elev: 1857').

=== Adjacent counties ===
- Oneida County – northwest
- Forest County – northeast
- Oconto County – east
- Menominee County – southeast
- Shawano County – south
- Marathon County – southwest
- Lincoln County – west

=== National protected area ===
- Nicolet National Forest (part)

== Demographics ==
Historical population
| Census | Pop. | Note | %± |
|---|---|---|---|
| 1880 | 685 | | — |
| 1890 | 9,465 | | 1,281.8% |
| 1900 | 12,553 | | 32.6% |
| 1910 | 17,062 | | 35.9% |
| 1920 | 21,471 | | 25.8% |
| 1930 | 21,544 | | 0.3% |
| 1940 | 23,227 | | 7.8% |
| 1950 | 21,975 | | −5.4% |
| 1960 | 19,916 | | −9.4% |
| 1970 | 19,220 | | −3.5% |
| 1980 | 19,978 | | 3.9% |
| 1990 | 19,505 | | −2.4% |
| 2000 | 20,740 | | 6.3% |
| 2010 | 19,977 | | −3.7% |
| 2020 | 19,491 | | −2.4% |
| 2025 (est.) | 19,534 | ▲ | 0.2% |
U.S. Decennial Census; 1790–1960 1900–1990; 1990–2000 2010 2020

=== Racial and ethnic composition ===
Langlade County, Wisconsin – Racial and ethnic composition Note: the US Census treats Hispanic/Latino as an ethnic category. This table excludes Latinos from the racial categories and assigns them to a separate category. Hispanics/Latinos may be of any race.
| Race / ethnicity (NH = Non-Hispanic) | Pop 1980 | Pop 1990 | Pop 2000 | Pop 2010 | Pop 2020 | % 1980 | % 1990 | % 2000 | % 2010 | % 2020 |
|---|---|---|---|---|---|---|---|---|---|---|
| White alone (NH) | 19,766 | 19,222 | 20,193 | 19,109 | 17,960 | 98.94% | 98.55% | 97.36% | 95.66% | 92.15% |
| Black or African American alone (NH) | 1 | 13 | 28 | 70 | 105 | 0.01% | 0.07% | 0.14% | 0.35% | 0.54% |
| Native American or Alaska Native alone (NH) | 98 | 137 | 109 | 172 | 235 | 0.49% | 0.70% | 0.53% | 0.86% | 1.21% |
| Asian alone (NH) | 14 | 22 | 57 | 62 | 67 | 0.07% | 0.11% | 0.27% | 0.31% | 0.34% |
| Native Hawaiian or Pacific Islander alone (NH) | x | x | 3 | 0 | 4 | x | x | 0.01% | 0.00% | 0.02% |
| Other race alone (NH) | 2 | 7 | 6 | 5 | 36 | 0.01% | 0.04% | 0.03% | 0.03% | 0.18% |
| Mixed race or Multiracial (NH) | x | x | 173 | 235 | 625 | x | x | 0.83% | 1.18% | 3.21% |
| Hispanic or Latino (any race) | 97 | 104 | 171 | 324 | 459 | 0.49% | 0.53% | 0.82% | 1.62% | 2.35% |
| Total | 19,978 | 19,505 | 20,740 | 19,977 | 19,491 | 100.00% | 100.00% | 100.00% | 100.00% | 100.00% |

=== 2020 census ===
As of the 2020 census, the county had a population of 19,491. The population density was 22.4 people per square mile (8.6 people/km^{2}). There were 12,138 housing units at an average density of 13.9 units per square mile (5.4 units/km^{2}). The median age was 49.5 years, with 19.7% of residents under the age of 18 and 25.2% of residents 65 years of age or older. For every 100 females there were 101.7 males, and for every 100 females age 18 and over there were 99.6 males age 18 and over.

There were 8,641 households in the county, of which 22.2% had children under the age of 18 living in them. Of all households, 48.7% were married-couple households, 20.2% were households with a male householder and no spouse or partner present, and 23.8% were households with a female householder and no spouse or partner present. About 31.6% of all households were made up of individuals and 16.1% had someone living alone who was 65 years of age or older.

The racial makeup of the county was 93.0% White, 0.5% Black or African American, 1.3% American Indian and Alaska Native, 0.4% Asian, <0.1% Native Hawaiian and Pacific Islander, 0.7% from some other race, and 4.1% from two or more races. Hispanic or Latino residents of any race comprised 2.4% of the population.

Of the 12,138 housing units, 28.8% were vacant. Among occupied housing units, 74.9% were owner-occupied and 25.1% were renter-occupied. The homeowner vacancy rate was 1.5% and the rental vacancy rate was 11.1%.

About 41.4% of residents lived in urban areas, while 58.6% lived in rural areas.

=== 2000 census ===
2000 Census age pyramid for Langlade County

As of the census of 2000, there were 20,740 people, 8,452 households, and 5,814 families residing in the county. The population density was 24 people per square mile (9.3 people/km^{2}). There were 11,187 housing units at an average density of 13 units per square mile (5.0 units/km^{2}). The racial makeup of the county was 97.93% White, 0.15% Black or African American, 0.54% Native American, 0.27% Asian, 0.02% Pacific Islander, 0.2% from other races, and 0.87% from two or more races. 0.82% of the population were Hispanic or Latino of any race. 49.4% were of German, 8.6% Polish, 6.2% Irish and 5.8% American ancestry.

There were 8,452 households, out of which 29.4% had children under the age of 18 living with them, 56.7% were married couples living together, 8.2% had a female householder with no husband present, and 31.2% were non-families. 26.7% of all households were made up of individuals, and 13.6% had someone living alone who was 65 years of age or older. The average household size was 2.42 and the average family size was 2.93.

In the county, the population was spread out, with 24.4% under the age of 18, 6.5% from 18 to 24, 26% from 25 to 44, 24.3% from 45 to 64, and 18.8% who were 65 years of age or older. The median age was 40 years. For every 100 females there were 98.5 males. For every 100 females age 18 and over, there were 95.6 males.

In 2017, there were 196 births, giving a general fertility rate of 68.3 births per 1000 women aged 15–44, the 20th highest rate out of all 72 Wisconsin counties.

== Transportation ==
=== Major highways ===
- U.S. Highway 45
- Highway 17 (Wisconsin)
- Highway 47 (Wisconsin)
- Highway 52 (Wisconsin)
- Highway 55 (Wisconsin)
- Highway 64 (Wisconsin)

=== Airport ===
- KAIG - Langlade County Airport

The county owns and operates the Langlade County Airport, which serves both the local and transient general aviation community.

== Communities ==
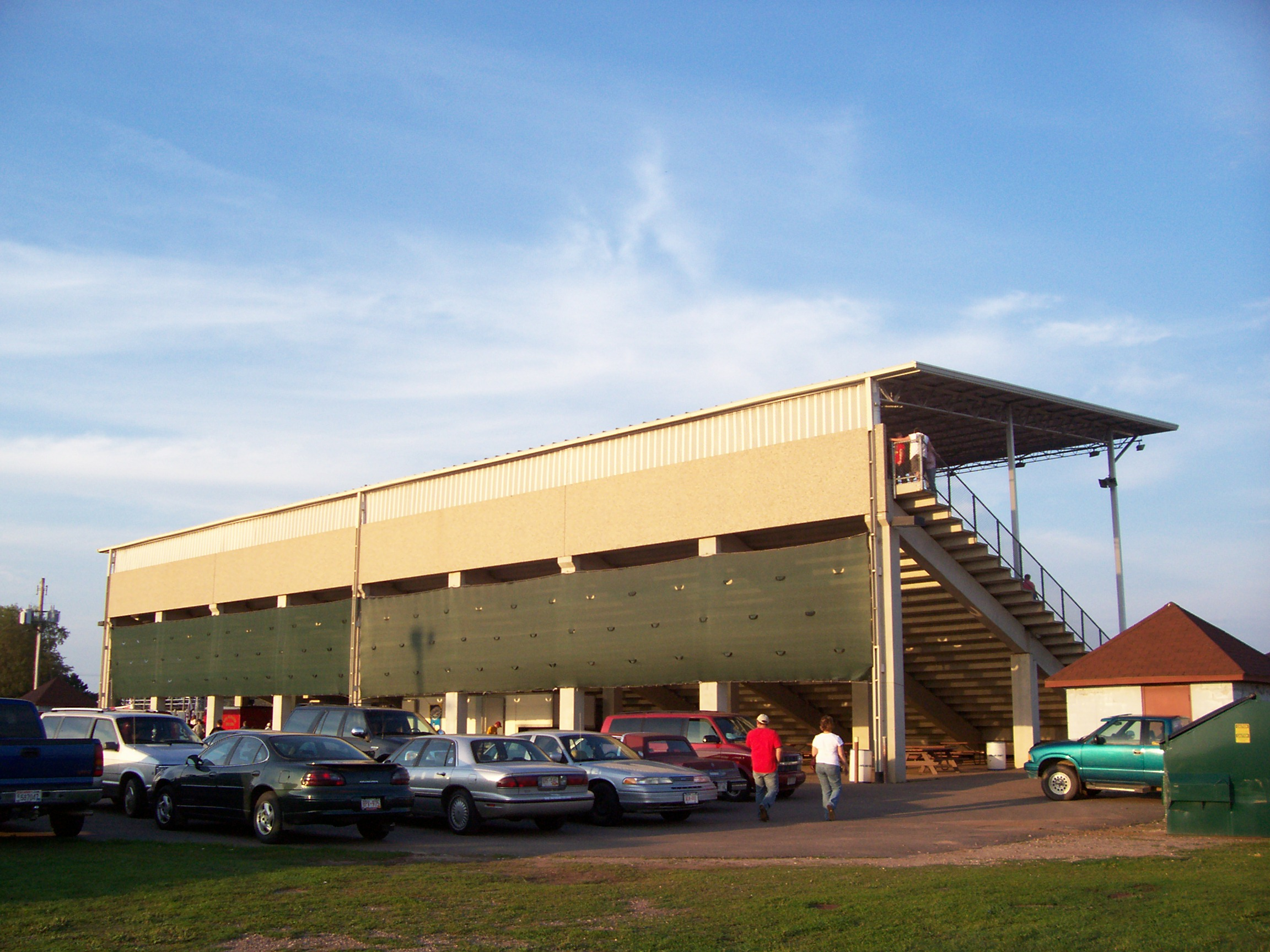
Langlade County Fairgrounds grandstands in Antigo

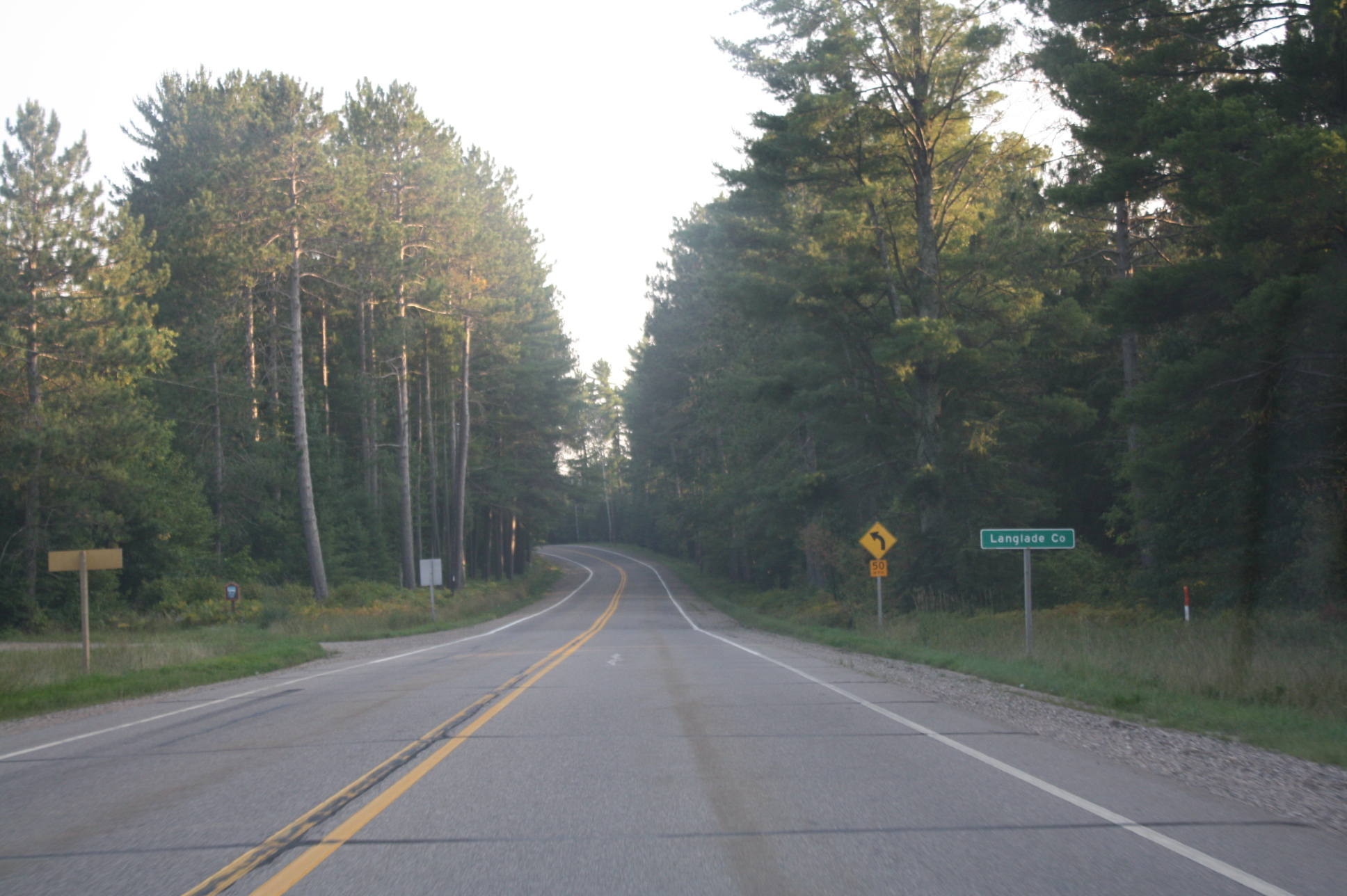
Looking south while entering Langlade County on WIS 55

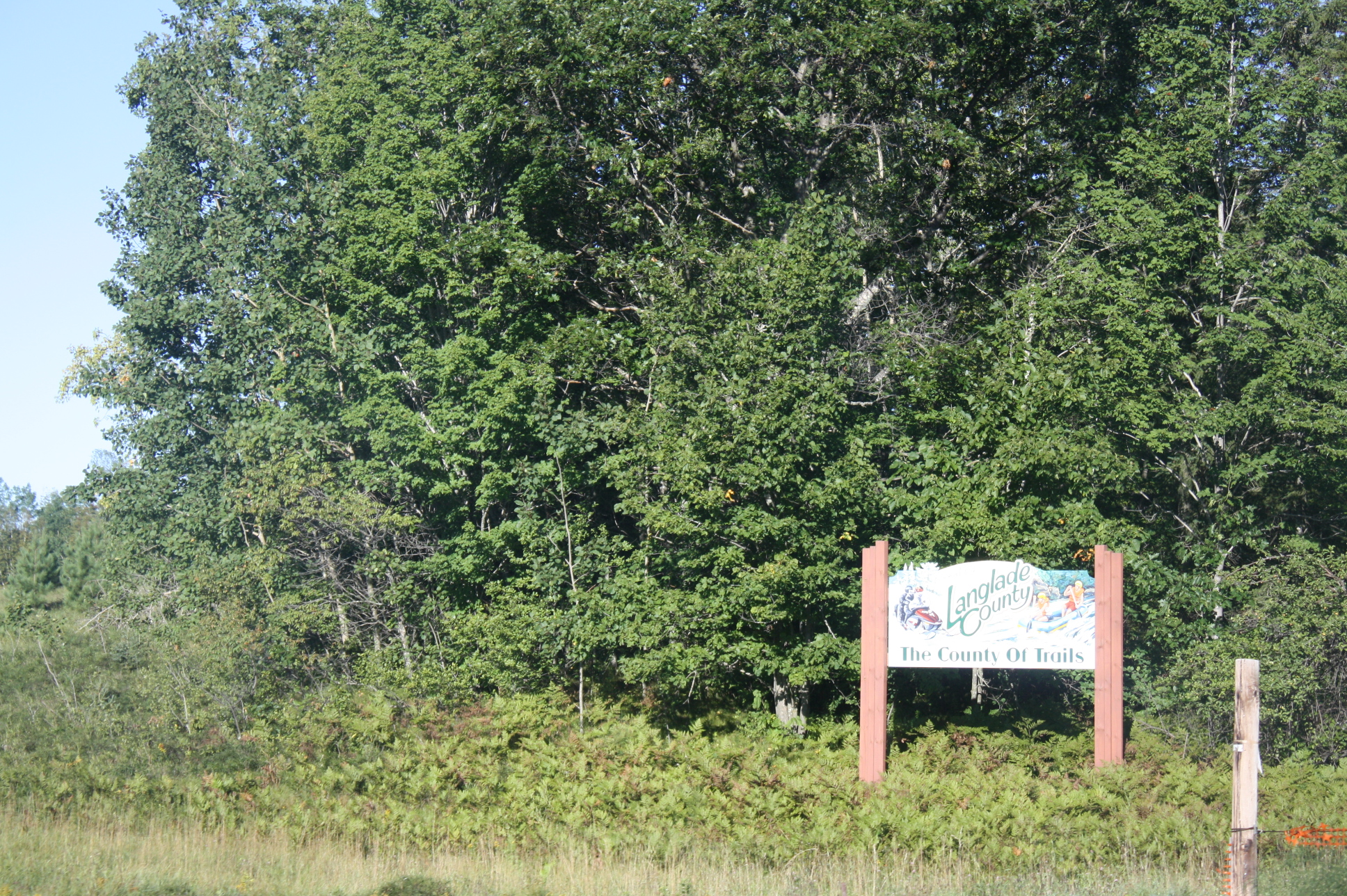
Looking north at the welcome sign for Langlade County

=== City ===
- Antigo (county seat)

=== Village ===
- White Lake

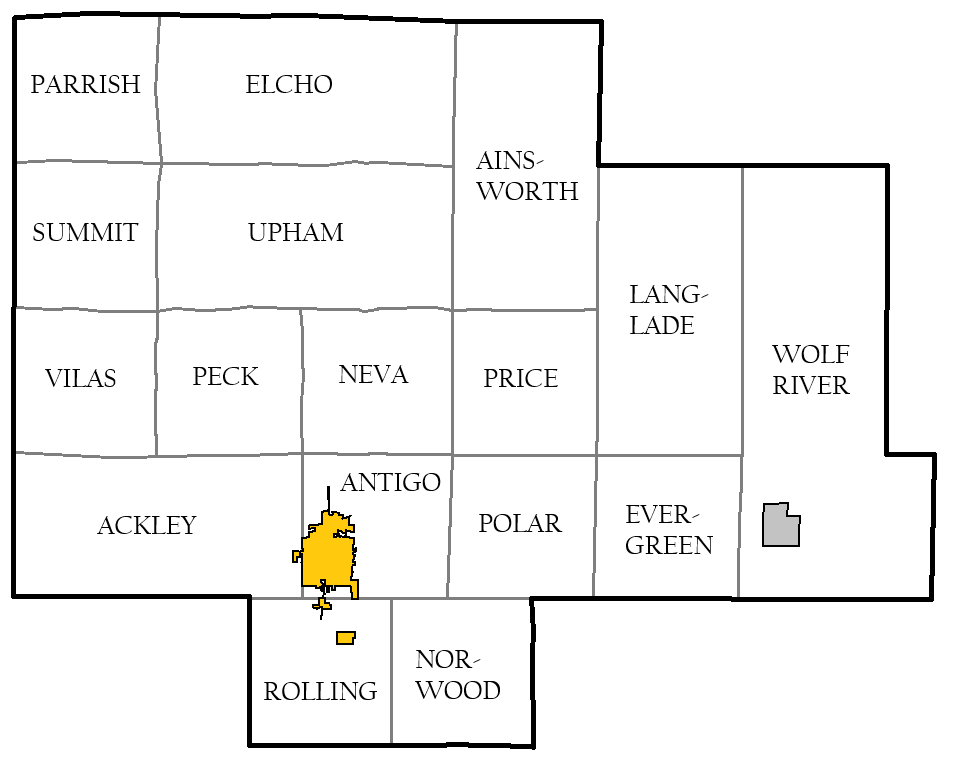
Towns of Langlade County

=== Towns ===
- Ackley
- Ainsworth
- Antigo
- Elcho
- Evergreen
- Langlade
- Neva
- Norwood
- Parrish
- Peck
- Polar
- Price
- Rolling
- Summit
- Upham
- Vilas
- Wolf River

=== Census-designated places ===
- Elcho
- Post Lake
- Summit Lake

=== Unincorporated communities ===
- Bavaria
- Bryant
- Choate
- Deerbrook
- Elmhurst
- Elton
- Four Corners
- Freeman
- Hollister
- Kempster
- Koepenick
- Langlade
- Lily
- Markton
- Neva
- Neva Corners
- Ormsby
- Parrish
- Pearson
- Phlox
- Pickerel
- Polar
- Sherry Junction

=== Ghost towns/neighborhoods ===
- Kent/Drexel
- Van Ostrand

== Politics ==
United States presidential election results for Langlade County, Wisconsin
| Year | Republican | | Democratic | | Third party(ies) | |
| Year | No. | % | No. | % | No. | % |
|---|---|---|---|---|---|---|
| 1892 | 844 | 38.40% | 1,289 | 58.64% | 65 | 2.96% |
| 1896 | 1,457 | 58.80% | 956 | 38.58% | 65 | 2.62% |
| 1900 | 1,596 | 58.38% | 1,080 | 39.50% | 58 | 2.12% |
| 1904 | 2,105 | 65.72% | 1,018 | 31.78% | 80 | 2.50% |
| 1908 | 1,921 | 57.21% | 1,340 | 39.90% | 97 | 2.89% |
| 1912 | 710 | 23.40% | 1,387 | 45.72% | 937 | 30.88% |
| 1916 | 1,538 | 45.09% | 1,755 | 51.45% | 118 | 3.46% |
| 1920 | 4,059 | 68.65% | 1,619 | 27.38% | 235 | 3.97% |
| 1924 | 2,572 | 35.98% | 926 | 12.95% | 3,651 | 51.07% |
| 1928 | 3,715 | 47.15% | 4,078 | 51.76% | 86 | 1.09% |
| 1932 | 2,340 | 26.44% | 6,332 | 71.56% | 177 | 2.00% |
| 1936 | 2,635 | 30.34% | 5,837 | 67.22% | 212 | 2.44% |
| 1940 | 4,523 | 46.09% | 5,190 | 52.88% | 101 | 1.03% |
| 1944 | 4,036 | 48.23% | 4,310 | 51.50% | 23 | 0.27% |
| 1948 | 3,441 | 42.58% | 4,346 | 53.78% | 294 | 3.64% |
| 1952 | 5,841 | 63.02% | 3,371 | 36.37% | 57 | 0.61% |
| 1956 | 5,004 | 63.82% | 2,804 | 35.76% | 33 | 0.42% |
| 1960 | 4,614 | 53.31% | 4,025 | 46.50% | 16 | 0.18% |
| 1964 | 2,994 | 37.05% | 5,077 | 62.83% | 10 | 0.12% |
| 1968 | 3,712 | 49.44% | 3,064 | 40.81% | 732 | 9.75% |
| 1972 | 4,368 | 57.26% | 3,011 | 39.47% | 250 | 3.28% |
| 1976 | 4,630 | 51.85% | 4,134 | 46.29% | 166 | 1.86% |
| 1980 | 4,866 | 49.30% | 4,498 | 45.57% | 507 | 5.14% |
| 1984 | 5,830 | 60.91% | 3,675 | 38.39% | 67 | 0.70% |
| 1988 | 4,884 | 53.17% | 4,254 | 46.31% | 48 | 0.52% |
| 1992 | 3,890 | 38.74% | 3,630 | 36.15% | 2,522 | 25.11% |
| 1996 | 3,206 | 37.15% | 4,074 | 47.20% | 1,351 | 15.65% |
| 2000 | 5,125 | 52.72% | 4,199 | 43.20% | 397 | 4.08% |
| 2004 | 6,235 | 56.30% | 4,751 | 42.90% | 88 | 0.79% |
| 2008 | 5,081 | 48.85% | 5,182 | 49.82% | 139 | 1.34% |
| 2012 | 5,816 | 55.29% | 4,573 | 43.47% | 130 | 1.24% |
| 2016 | 6,478 | 63.60% | 3,250 | 31.91% | 458 | 4.50% |
| 2020 | 7,330 | 65.65% | 3,704 | 33.18% | 131 | 1.17% |
| 2024 | 7,782 | 66.72% | 3,746 | 32.12% | 136 | 1.17% |

Beginning in 1952, Langlade County has voted Republican in all but three presidential elections, backing Lyndon B. Johnson in his 1964 landslide, choosing Bill Clinton in 1996 with a prominent third party showing from Ross Perot keeping Clinton from obtaining a majority in the county, and narrowly supporting Barack Obama in 2008 by just 101 votes and less than a 1% margin of victory. In recent elections the Republican strength in the county has increased; Donald Trump's performance in 2020 and subsequently in 2024 were the best Republican showings since Warren G. Harding in 1924.

== See also ==
- National Register of Historic Places listings in Langlade County, Wisconsin
