= Land of the Silver Birch =

1920s Canadian folk song

"Land of the Silver Birch" (Roud 4550) is a traditional Canadian folk song that dates from the 1920s. The lyrics are sometimes erroneously attributed to Pauline Johnson, perhaps in confusion with her well-known poem, "The Song My Paddle Sings". It is sometimes sung to keep time while canoeing, and sometimes sung at campfires in a round. It is in Aeolian, or natural minor, but may be sung with a raised sixth, creating a Dorian feel.

Its subject matter is a romanticized vision of nature and the land from the perspective of an Indigenous person.

== Lyrics ==
As with most traditional songs, the lyrics vary slightly. The following are representative:

"Land of the Silver Birch"

verse 1:

Land of the silver birch
Home of the beaver
Where still the mighty moose
Wanders at will

Refrain:
Blue lake and rocky shore
I will return once more
boomdidi boom boom – boomdidi boom boom – boomdidi boom boom boom

High on a rocky ledge
I'll build my wigwam (Alternate version: There where the blue lake lies, I'll set my wigwam)
Close to the water's edge
Silent and still

Refrain

My heart grows sick for thee
Here in the low lands
I will return to thee
Hills of the north

Refrain

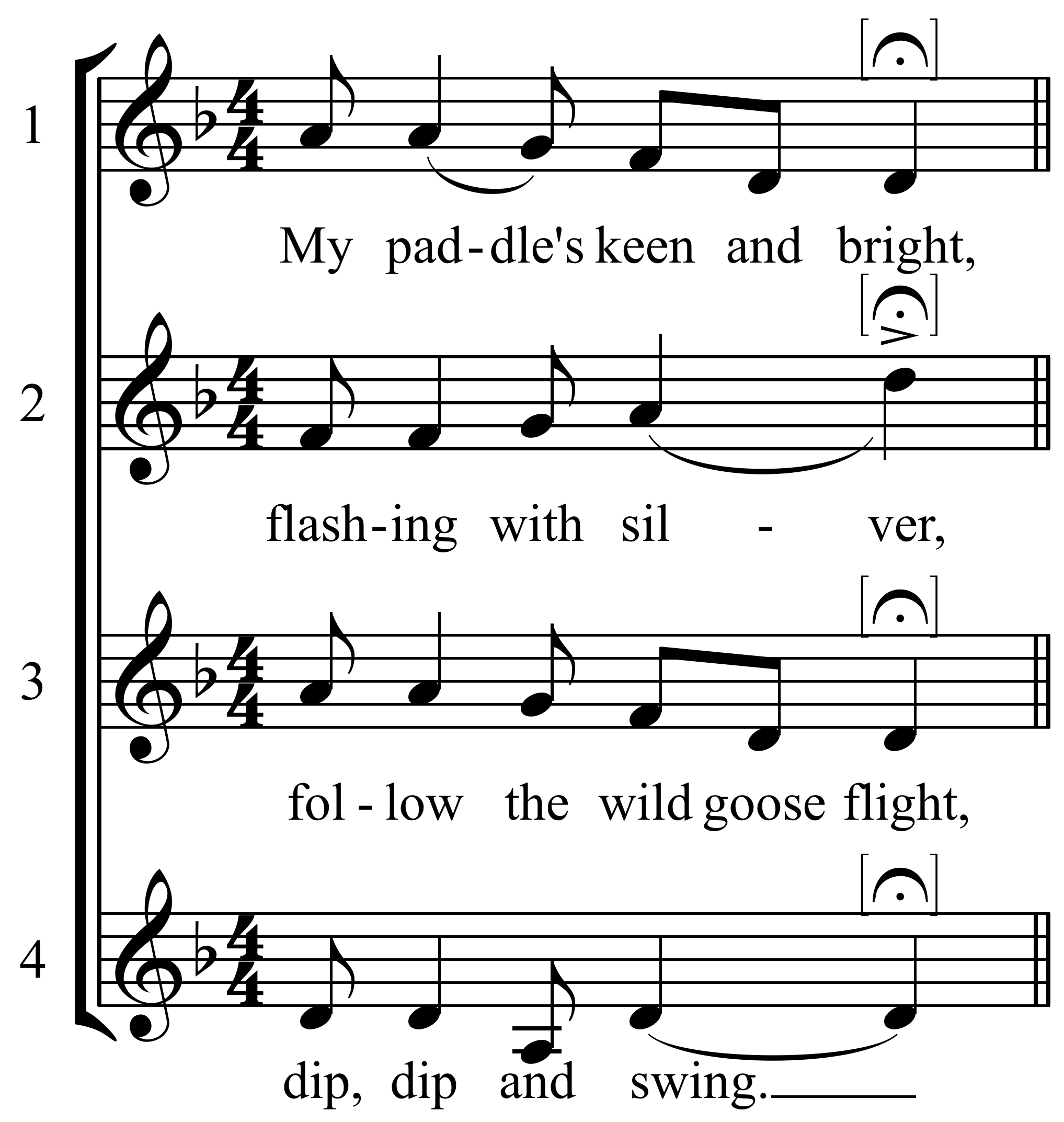
"My Paddle's Keen and Bright"

It is related to a similar song "My Paddle's Keen and Bright", written by Margaret Embers McGee (1889–1975) in 1918, which is used to keep time paddling and is frequently intermingled:

My paddle's keen and bright
Flashing with silver
Follow the wild goose flight (other known colloquial versions of this line exist, including: Follow the pale moonlight, and Follow the waters light.)
Dip, dip and swing

Dip, dip and swing her back
Flashing with silver
Swift as the wild goose flies
Dip, dip and swing

== Alternative lyrics ==
The lyrics of this song often vary by region. Some possible variations and additional verses:

Deep in the forest
Down in the lowlands
My heart cries out for thee
Hills of the North

Swift as a silver fish
Canoe of birch bark
Thy mighty waterways
Carry me forth

Though I am forced to flee
Far from my homeland
I will return to thee
Hills of the North

High as an eagle soars
Over the mountains
My spirit rises up
Free as a bird

A French version, "Terre du bouleau blanc", was distributed by Orff Canada.

In 1979 the Canadian Cultural Workers' Committee, a musical group associated with the Communist Party of Canada (Marxist-Leninist), released a song on their album 'The Party is the Most Precious Thing' titled 'Death to the Traitors' which takes its melody from "Land of the Silver Birch" but with new communist lyrics about destroying imperialism and capitalism in Canada and uniting the Canadian working class.

== "Silver Birch" in the Scouts and Guiding movement ==
Since the 1930s, the song has been popular with Scouts and Girl Guides. Its origin is unclear. It is sung regularly at Canadian Scout and Guide camps, including Doe Lake, Camp Maple Leaf, Camp Wenonah (co-educational camp) and Camp Peaceful Waters in Quebec's lower Laurentians.

The song is also sometimes sung at Boy Scout Camps in the United States, though sometimes "eagle" is sung in place of "beaver". Another variation is sung at the opening and closing campfires at Ma-Ka-Ja-Wan Scout Reservation in Pearson, Wisconsin. Cuyuna Scout Camp of Crosslake, Minnesota uses this song as one of the three it uses to close its Sunday and Friday night campfire programs, as does Camp Babcock-Hovey in Ovid, New York.

The translated Italian version "Terra di Betulla" is likely frequent campfire song for Italian scouts.

The Dutch version “Land van de Zilverberk” is sung in Dutch scouts groups. It is likely this version travelled to the Netherlands through different scout Jamborees.

== Other uses ==
In the 2019 film Brotherhood, directed by Richard Bell is based on a true story of a 1926 canoeing accident in an Ontario, Canada lake at a boys' summer camp. Ten boys and a camp counsellor died, when their 30-foot canoe capsized. The boys' hearty rendition of Land of the Silver Birch as the canoe trip began, is replayed throughout the film in subdued tones, reflecting the survivors' struggle to stay alive in the dark, frigid waters.

== See also ==
- Canadian patriotic music
