= Elcho =

Elcho may refer to:

- Earl of Wemyss
- Elcho Castle, castle, village, and site of former nunnery near Perth, Scotland
- Elcho Priory, Scotland
- Elcho Shield, international match rifle competition
- Elcho, Wisconsin, a town in the United States
- Elcho (community), Wisconsin, an unincorporated community in the United States
- Elcho Island, Arnhem Land, Northern Territory, Australia
