= Des Plaines Valley Council =

Boy Scouts of America local council

- Owner: Boy Scouts of America
- Headquarters: La Grange, Illinois
- Country: United States
- Founded: 1993
- Defunct: 2014

The Des Plaines Valley Council was a former Boy Scouts of America local council that was headquartered in La Grange, Illinois, United States. In 2014, the council merged with the Calumet Council, Chicago Area Council, and Northwest Suburban Council to form Pathway to Adventure Council.

It was formed through the merger of the West Suburban Council and the Thatcher Woods Council in 1993. The council operated Camp Shin-Go-Beek near Waupaca, Wisconsin and Camp Mach-Kin-O-Siew near Elcho, Wisconsin. Both camps closed in October of 2015. The council operated the BSA Adventure Camp in Rochelle, Illinois, in a joint venture with Three Fires Council. The camp was sold in November 2018. The council sold Camp Tomo-Chi-Chi-Knolls in Huntley, Illinois to the Kane County Forest Preserve District as of January 1, 2007. Long before that, in the 1980s, as The West Suburban Council, it sold its Camp Delavan located on Lake Delavan in Wisconsin. Des Plaines Valley Council was served by Pachsegink OA Lodge.

== District Organization ==
District organization at the time of the merger was:

Tall Grass District services Burr Ridge, Clarendon Hills, Darien, Downers Grove, Hinsdale, Lemont, Westmont, and Willowbrook.

Twin Lakes District services Bellwood, Broadview, Elmwood Park, Forest Park, Franklin Park, Leyden Township, Maywood, Melrose Park, Northlake, Oak Park, River Forest, River Grove, and Stone Park.

Voyageur Trace District services Berwyn, Bridgeview, Brookfield, Countryside, Hodgkins, Indian Head Park, Justice, La Grange, La Grange Highlands, La Grange Park, Lyons, McCook, North Riverside, Riverside, Stickney, Westchester, Western Springs, and Willow Springs.

== Camp Mach-Kin-O-Siew ==
Camp Mach-Kin-O-Siew
- Location: Elcho, Wisconsin
- Coordinates: 45.460497°N 89.248883°W

Camp Mach-Kin-O-Siew (popularly known as Camp Mach) was located near Elcho, Wisconsin, in Langlade County, Wisconsin, United States, on Enterprise Lake.

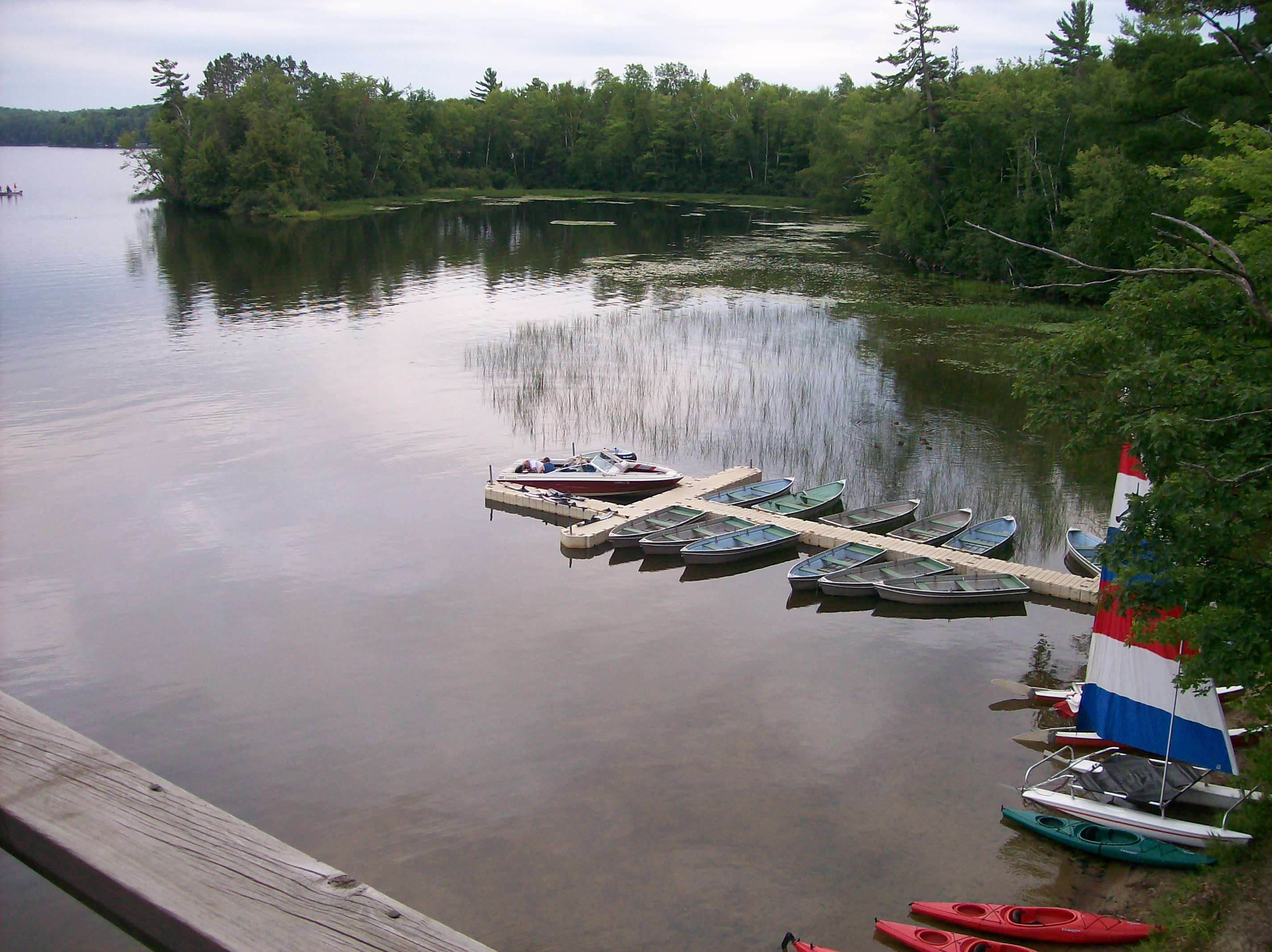
The boats owned by the camp viewed from Mach's "Stairway to Heaven" lookout tower.

With a size of approximately 590 acres surrounded by more wooded areas, it provided a northwoods wilderness type camping environment.

The camp summer program has operated for as many as 8 weeks per year. This was eventually reduced to two weeks a year, from the last week of July to the first week of August. Scout troops stayed for 7 days at a time, checking in Sunday, checking out Saturday.

Major parts of the camp's program were its merit badge classes. A wide range of merit badges were offered. The Order of the Arrow lodge held a calling-out ceremony at camp, and candidates have the opportunity to complete their ordeal induction the following day. Other activities included hiking, fishing, a bog hike, boating, rifle, shotgun, climbing, swimming and livesaving.

Mach's facilities included a waterfront area, a field sports area (comprising rifle, shotgun, and archery ranges), thirteen campgrounds, several piers, a campfire bowl, a climbing tower, a forge, a water slide, a shower house, and a chapel. However, the camp had no dining hall, so the Scouts cook all their meals with supplies provided by the camp (except for the first and last dinners.)

The extensive waterfront area was located on a beach along Enterprise Lake. It consists of a large swimming area, a lookout tower dedicated to the memory Of Scouter Rudolph J. Kasal, a boat dock, and a water slide. The camp owned a fleet of boats, consisting of kayaks, sunfish class sailboats, catamarans, an inboard motorboat for waterskiing, two outboard motorboats, rowboats, canoes, a dinghy, and sailboards. The camp also has two smaller lakes "Big Apple" and "Little Apple" within its borders.

The Camp Cup was a competition between the troops visiting the camp. The scoring for the Camp Cup was derived from campsite inspections and competitions in Scout skills (e.g. archery). One major competition was Monster Camp, in which troops decorate their campsite using Scout skills. Judges searched in the temporary sets for good use of Scout skills, such as lashings.

Because the Boy Scouts of America maintains a "Leave No Trace" philosophy, the Scouts that attend Camp Mach attempt to preserve the camp's natural environment. The only island in Enterprise Lake was owned by the camp. It is maintained as a wildlife sanctuary, therefore no person can set foot on the island. Other natural features include two small lakes, a bog, and a marsh.

The camp has ceased to operate as a Boy Scout camp.

== Camp Shin-Go-Beek ==
Since 1948, Camp Shin-Go-Beek has been located near Waupaca, Wisconsin on Big Twin and Little Twin lakes. The camp is close to the chain-of-lakes area of central Wisconsin, the Crystal River and Shadow Lake (used for camp canoe trips), and many outdoor recreation areas including the Wolf and Fox Rivers. College towns of Oshkosh, Appleton, and Stevens Point are nearby. The camp is serviced by Order of the Arrow Pachsegink Lodge.

Both Cub Scouts and Boy Scouts use Camp Shin-Go-Beek. The camp operated for several weeks in late June and early July, then the staff moved to Camp Mach-Kin-O-Siew for two weeks. The camp is home to chipmunks, deer, coyotes, and many endangered birds, such as the bald eagle, the sandhill crane, and the blue heron.

The camp has ceased to operate as a scout camp following the summer season of 2015, however the western section of the property has been acquired by the Shin-Go-Beek Foundation which has continued camping operations under the name "Camp Shin-Go-Beek". The camp was reopened to campers in 2018.

== See also ==
- Scouting in Illinois
- Scouting in Wisconsin
