= Post Lake, Wisconsin =

Census-designated place in Wisconsin, United States

- Census-designated place

- Location within Wisconsin Location within the United States
- Coordinates: 45°26′27″N 89°04′49″W
- Country: United States
- State: Wisconsin
- County: Langlade
- Town: Elcho

Area
  - Total: 8.874 sq mi (22.98 km^{2})
  - Land: 7.248 sq mi (18.77 km^{2})
  - Water: 1.626 sq mi (4.21 km^{2})
- Elevation: 1,532 ft (467 m)

Population (2020)
  - Total: 343
  - Density: 47.3/sq mi (18.3/km^{2})
- Time zone: UTC-6 (Central (CST))
  - Summer (DST): UTC-5 (CDT)
- ZIP Code: 54428 (Elcho)
- Area codes: 715 & 534
- GNIS feature ID: 1571820
- FIPS code: 55-64550

Post Lake is an unincorporated community and census-designated place (CDP) in the town of Elcho, Langlade County, Wisconsin, United States. Post Lake is 12 miles (19 km) southwest of Crandon. As of the 2020 census, its population was 343, down from 374 at the 2010 census. A post office was established in 1884, but it was eventually discontinued in 1913.

The Mole Lake Ojibwe have at times been called the Post Lake Band. They say the name of the lake comes from a spiritually significant post that stood near the outlet of the lake in days gone by.

== Notable people ==
Notable people that were born or lived in Post Lake include the following:

- Marie Antoinette Chevalier (1793–1865), after whom the city of Marinette, Wisconsin is named
