= Miami Council =

Miami Council may refer to several local councils of the Boy Scouts of America:

- Miami Valley Council in Ohio
- Miami Council (Florida), now South Florida Council
- Miami Council (Oklahoma), now Cherokee Area Council
- Dayton-Miami Valley Area Council, now Miami Valley Council in Ohio
