= Ainsworth, Wisconsin =

- Town
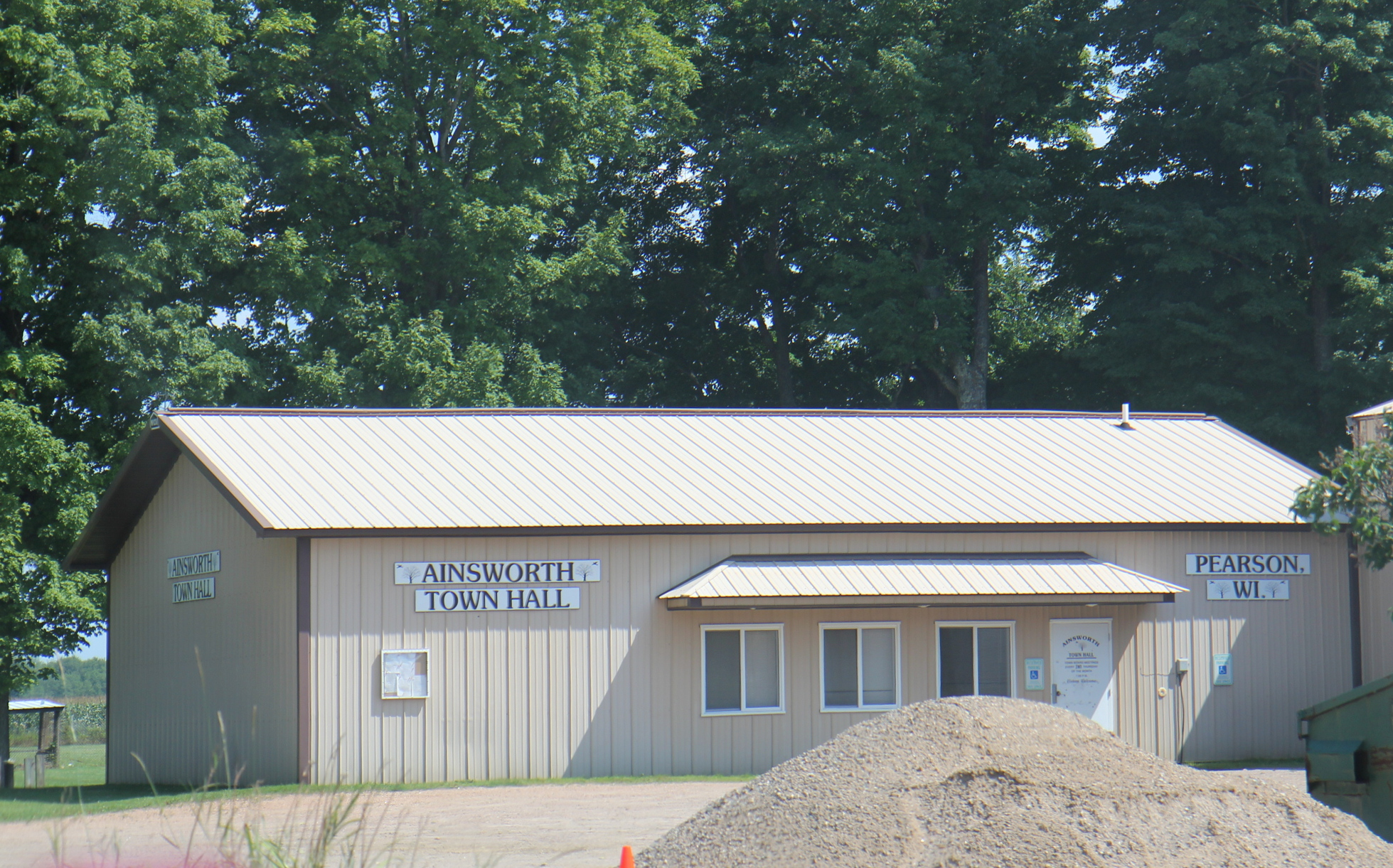
- Town hall

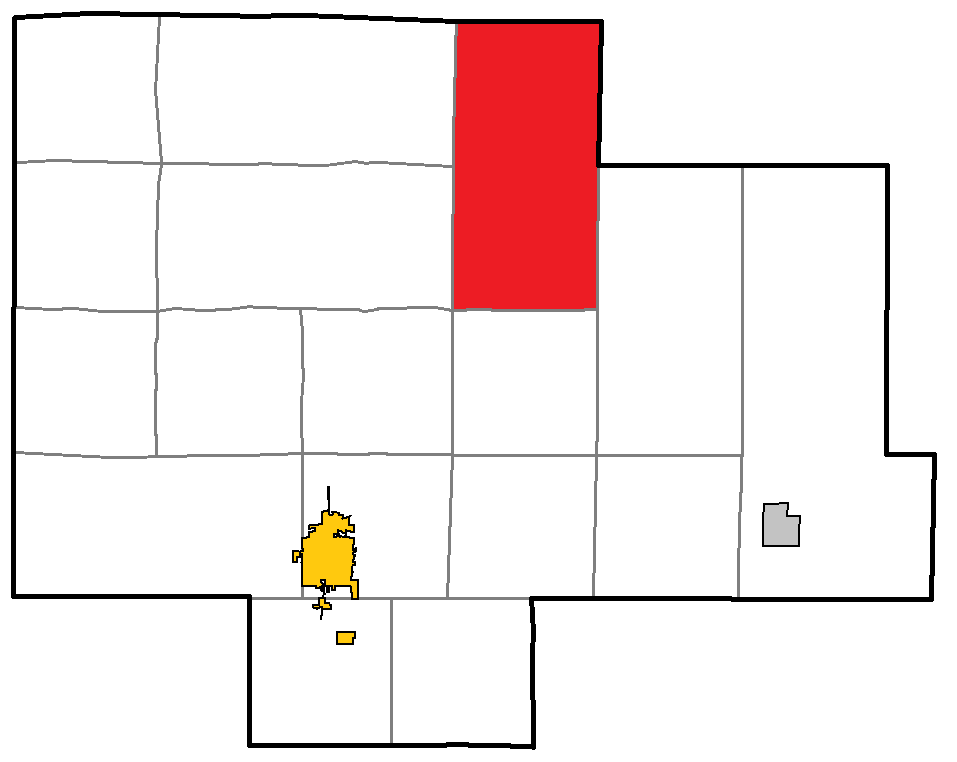
- Location of Ainsworth, within Langlade County
- Coordinates: 45°23′14″N 88°58′32″W
- Country: United States
- State: Wisconsin
- County: Langlade
- Established: 1904

Area
  - Total: 72.1 sq mi (186.8 km^{2})
  - Land: 69.3 sq mi (179.5 km^{2})
  - Water: 2.8 sq mi (7.2 km^{2})
- Elevation: 1,535 ft (468 m)

Population (2020)
  - Total: 477
  - Density: 6.88/sq mi (2.66/km^{2})
- Time zone: UTC-6 (Central (CST))
  - Summer (DST): UTC-5 (CDT)
- ZIP Codes: 54462 (Pearson); 54428 (Elcho); 54465 (Pickerel); 54424 (Deerbrook)
- Area codes: 715 & 534
- FIPS code: 55-00625
- GNIS feature ID: 1582662
- Website: https://ainsworthwi.gov/

Ainsworth is a town in Langlade County, Wisconsin, United States. The town was founded in 1904, and was named for Thomas Ainsworth, a civil engineer who supervised the construction of the Wolf River Dam in 1869 for the Keshena Improvement Company. The population was 477 at the 2020 census, up from 469 at the 2010 census. The unincorporated community of Pearson is located within the town. The township is served by the Pickerel Volunteer Fire Department, and the Pickerel Rescue Squad for ambulance services.

== Geography ==
Ainsworth is in northern Langlade County; it is bordered to the north and partially to the east by Forest County. Pearson is in the west-central part of the town, where the Wolf River is joined from the west by the Hunting River.

According to the United States Census Bureau, the town of Ainsworth has a total area of 72.1 square miles (186.8 km^{2}), of which 69.3 square miles (179.5 km^{2}) are land and 2.8 square miles (7.2 km^{2}), or 3.88%, are water. The Wolf River, a major component of the Fox River basin, flows from northwest to southeast across the town. Rolling Stone Lake and the west end of Pickerel Lake are in the northeastern part of the town, draining via Pickerel Creek to the Wolf River north of Pearson.

== Demographics ==
As of the census of 2000, there were 571 people, 255 households, and 175 families residing in the town. The population density was 8.2 people per square mile (3.2/km^{2}). There were 549 housing units at an average density of 7.9 per square mile (3.1/km^{2}). The racial makeup of the town was 98.77% White, 0.18% Native American, 0.35% Pacific Islander, and 0.7% from two or more races.

There were 255 households, out of which 19.6% had children under the age of 18 living with them, 57.3% were married couples living together, 6.3% had a female householder with no husband present, and 31% were non-families. 25.1% of all households were made up of individuals, and 12.5% had someone living alone who was 65 years of age or older. The average household size was 2.24 and the average family size was 2.64.

In the town, the population was spread out, with 17% under the age of 18, 4.7% from 18 to 24, 22.8% from 25 to 44, 33.8% from 45 to 64, and 21.7% who were 65 years of age or older. The median age was 48 years. For every 100 females, there were 104.7 males. For every 100 females age 18 and over, there were 107.9 males.

The median income for a household in the town was $27,727, and the median income for a family was $31,719. Males had a median income of $26,538 versus $17,768 for females. The per capita income for the town was $14,162. About 7.1% of families and 10.6% of the population were below the poverty line, including 10.8% of those under age 18 and 5.2% of those age 65 or over.

== See also ==
- List of towns in Wisconsin
