= Lake Killian =

Lake in the state of Wisconsin, United States

- Location within Wisconsin
- Location: Pearson, Wisconsin, United States
- Coordinates: 45°22′01″N 88°57′46″W
- Primary inflows: spring water, precipitation
- Primary outflows: Skid's Creek
- Basin countries: United States
- Max. length: 1,150 metres (3,770 ft)
- Max. width: 490 metres (1,610 ft)
- Surface area: 28.5 hectares (0.110 sq mi)
- Average depth: 3.6 metres (12 ft)
- Max. depth: 7.6 metres (25 ft)
- Water volume: 1,020,000 cubic metres (830 acre⋅ft)
- Shore length^{1}: 3.0 kilometres (1.9 mi)
- Surface elevation: 465 m (1,526 ft)
- ^{1} Shore length is not a well-defined measure.

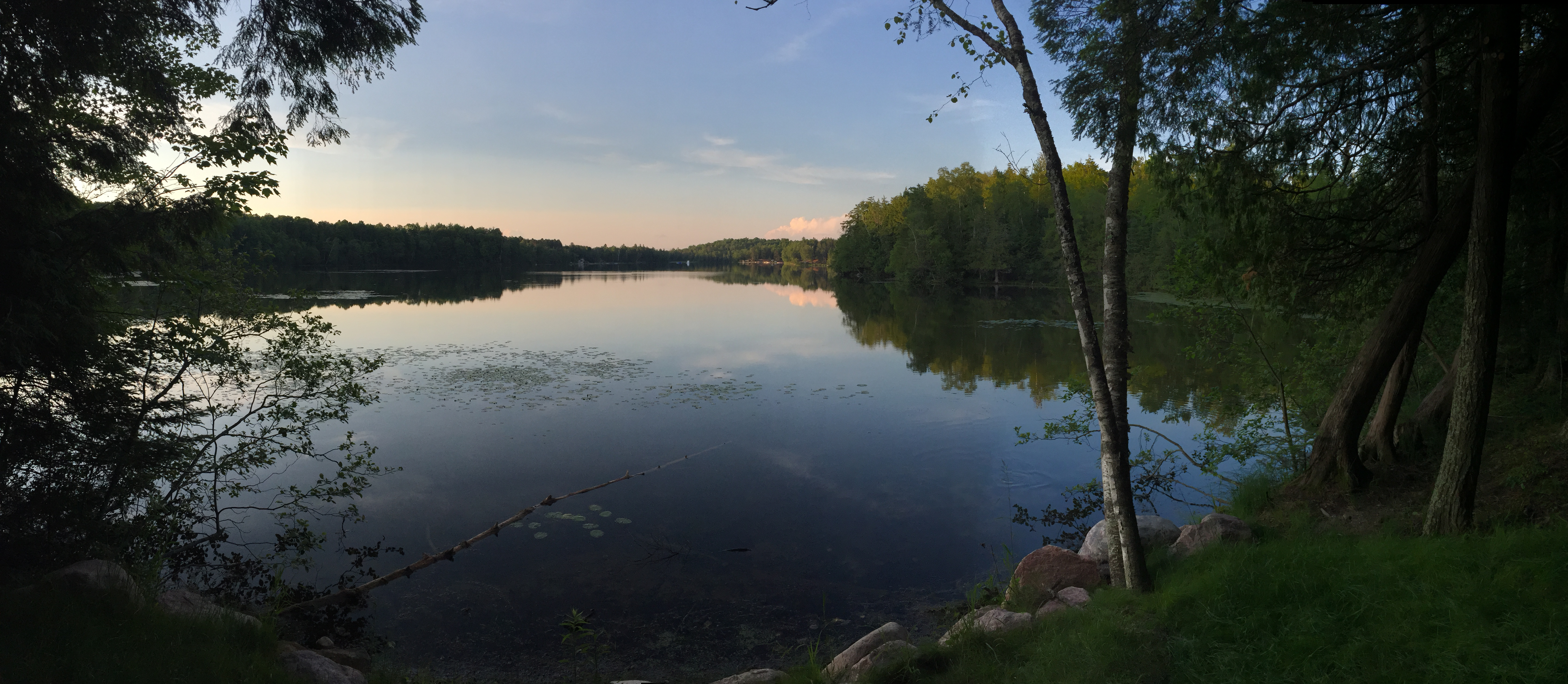
A panoramic view of Lake Killian taken on its south shore

Lake Killian is a small kettle lake wholly encompassed by Ma-Ka-Ja-Wan Scout Reservation in Pearson, Wisconsin. It is a central geographic feature of the camp, dividing it into East Camp and West Camp on opposing sides of the lake. Both East Camp and West Camp maintain aquatics facilities where campers can complete various merit badges. The lake is used by scouts on both sides of the lake for fishing, swimming, and boating. Spring Lake Road, which goes through the scout reservation, is named for the lake.

== Hydrology ==
Lake Killian receives all of its water from springs and precipitation; the only outflow is Skid's Creek on the west side of the lake. Skid's Creek drains from so far north in the lake that water in the southern basin has a significantly greater residence time than more northern waters.

== Bathymetry ==
The bathymetric character of Lake Killian is dominated by a shallow northern third, with depths under 3 metres. The lake steadily deepens moving toward its center, with a deep central basin of 5 metres' depth or deeper occupying the central third. The southern and eastern portions of the lake are generally deeper than the northern and western regions. A large sandbar, less than a metre under the surface and stretching a hundred metres from end to end, dominates the southwestern extremity of the lake and is surrounded by comparatively shallow waters. The deep central basin of the lake plunges to a maximum of 7.6 metres (25 ft), though the average depth is much shallower, only 3.6 metres (12 ft).
