= Enterprise Lake =

Lake in Langlade County, Wisconsin, United States

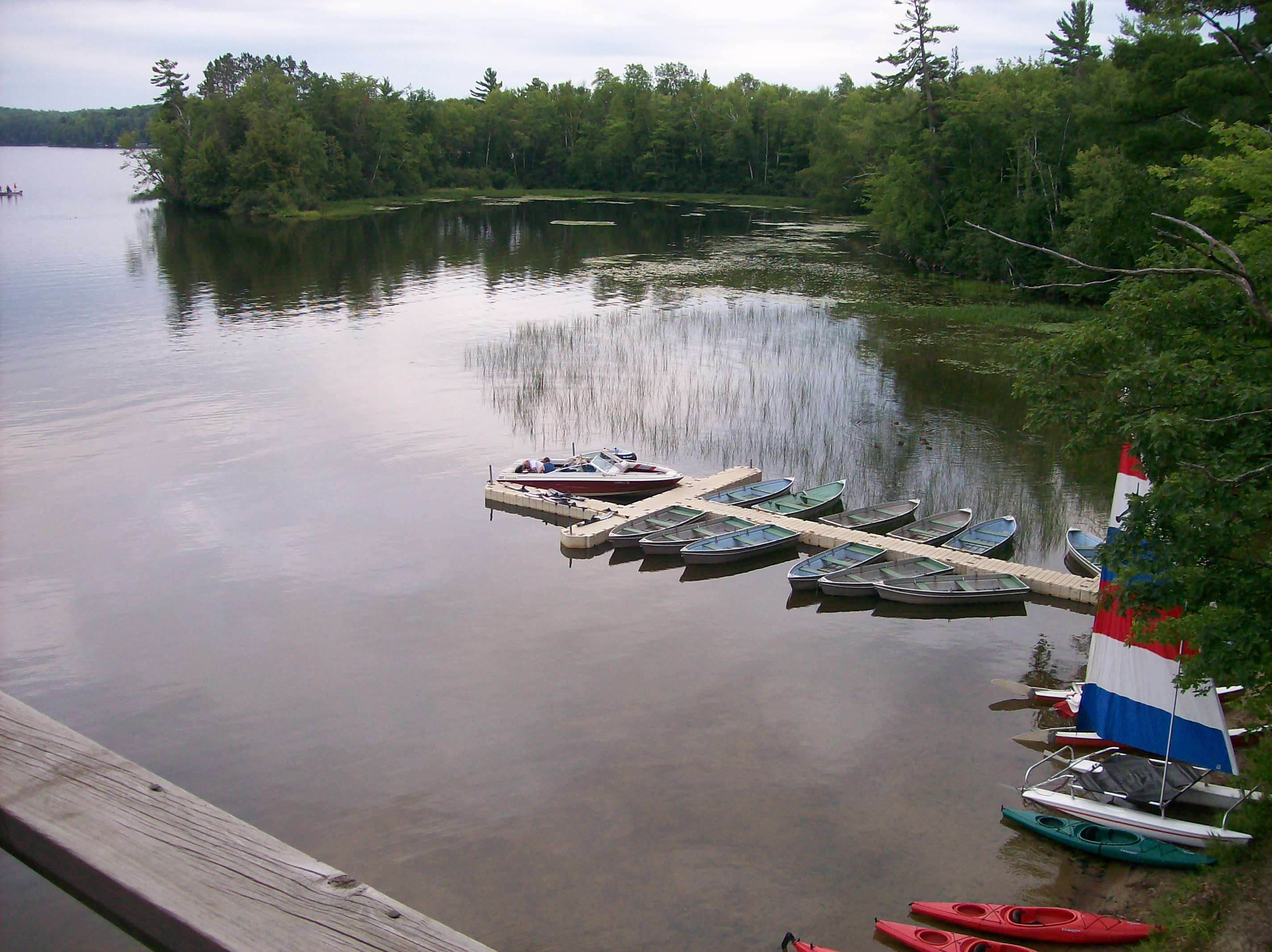
- Shoreline viewed from Camp Mach

- Location within Wisconsin Location within the United States
- Location: Langlade County, Wisconsin
- Coordinates: 45°27′19″N 089°14′29″W
- Primary inflows: Enterprise Creek
- Primary outflows: Enterprise Creek
- Basin countries: United States
- Surface area: 504.1 acres (2.04 km^{2})
- Max. depth: 27 ft (8.2 m)
- Islands: 1

Enterprise Lake is a lake in Wisconsin, United States. It has a maximum depth of 27 feet (8.2 m). Part of its shoreline, and only island, belongs to Camp Mach-Kin-O-Siew. Enterprise Lake is a 509-acre lake located in Langlade County.
