= Pathway to Adventure Council =

Boy Scouts council in Chicago, Illinois, US

- Owner: Scouting America
- Country: United States
- Founded: 2015
- Membership: 9,000 youth 6,000 adults
- President: Dr. Marlon Mitchell
- Council Commissioner: Jim Honan
- Scout Executive: Jeff Isaac
- Website www.pathwaytoadventure.org

Pathway to Adventure Council District Map

Pathway to Adventure Council, also known as PTAC, is a Scouting America local council headquartered in Chicago, Illinois. Created from the merger of four councils, it spans a large portion of the Chicago metropolitan area and part of Northwest Indiana. The council operates two camps and four service centers and had about 21,000 youth members according to its own reports in 2021. The Order of the Arrow Takhone Lodge #7 serves the Pathway To Adventure Council.

Pathway To Adventure Council Shoulder Patch

== History ==
In 2014, the Chicago Area Council, Des Plaines Valley Council, Northwest Suburban Council, and Calumet Council announced they would be merging to increase efficiency and to remain sustainable as an organization. The merger occurred on January 1, 2015. At first, each of the predecessor councils was reorganized as "Communities" with each maintaining its service centers and schedules. The council has since homogenized the communities by creating districts that span the boundaries of the former councils. The new council inherited several long-term camps from its predecessor councils, but closed Camp Mach-Kin-O-Siew and Camp Shin-Go-Beek in 2015 and announced the closure of Camp Lakota. Camp Lakota's closing was delayed for several years, and ceased operations on May 23, 2021. In 2021, the council announced that Camp Napowan in Wild Rose, Wisconsin would be closed and put up for sale. The camp was closed on October 11, 2021.

In 2015, the Illinois General Assembly passed a resolution praising the council and declared September 15, 2015, as "Scouts of Illinois Recruitment Day" within Illinois.

== Organization ==
The council is formed of ten districts that cover parts of Cook, DuPage, Lake, and Will counties in Illinois, and Lake County, Indiana. Four service centers inherited from the predecessor councils support Pathway to Adventure Council, with centers located in Arlington Heights, Illinois, Chicago, Illinois, La Grange, Illinois, and Munster, Indiana. For a short period, the council operated the Boy Scout Discovery Outpost at Woodfield Mall.

== Order of the Arrow Takhone Lodge #7 ==
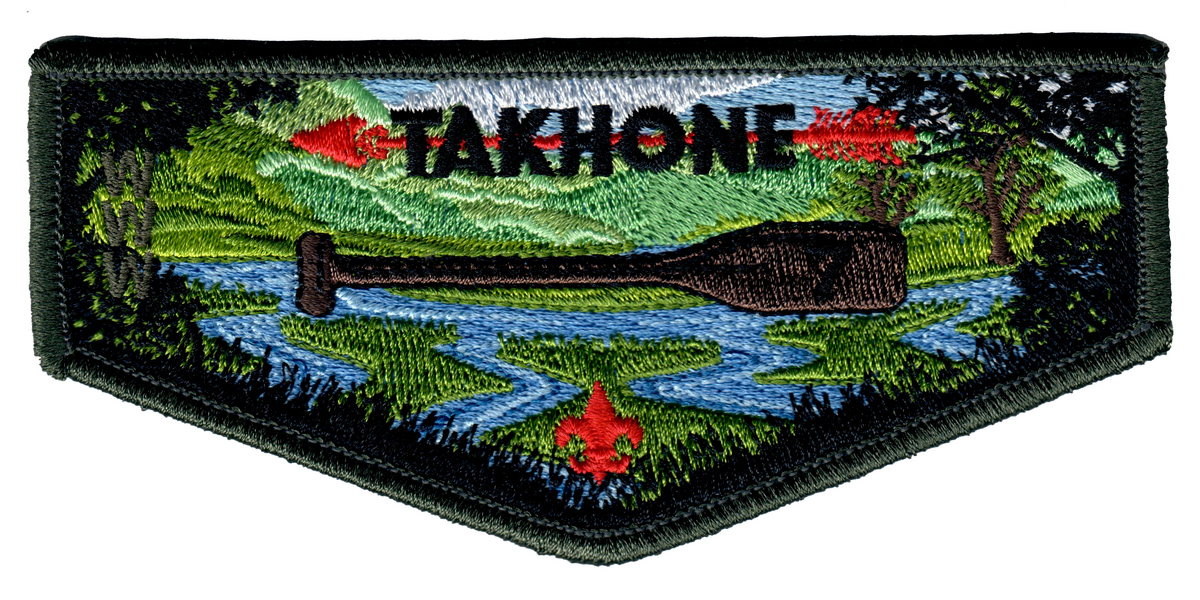
Takhone Lodge Flap

The Pathway to Adventure Council is served by the Order of the Arrow Takhone Lodge #7. The Lodge was formed on January 1, 2019 through the merge of Lakota, Michigamea, Owasippe, and Pachsegink Lodges. The Lodge Totem is the Canoe Paddle. The Lenape word Takhone translates to "the place where rivers join."

https://oa7.org/

== Camps ==
The council operates two camps: Camp Frank S. Betz in Berrien Springs, Michigan and Owasippe Scout Reservation in Twin Lake, Michigan. The council previously operated more camps than it acquired in the merger, but they have since ceased operations to reduce operational expenditures.

=== Camp Frank S. Betz ===
Camp Betz Thunderbird Hall

Camp Frank S. Betz is located in Berrien Springs, Michigan. Named after the person who donated the land for the camp. Camp Betz has been continually operating since 1922.

=== Owasippe Scout Reservation ===
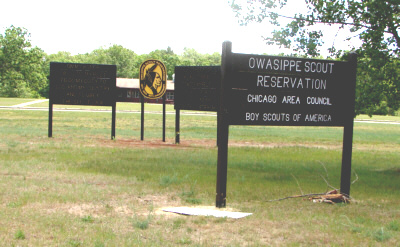
Owasippe Scout Reservation is one of four camps maintained by the Pathway to Adventure Council.

Owasippe Scout Reservation is a resident camp located in Twin Lake, Michigan. Founded in 1911, it is the oldest continually operated Scout Camp in the United States. Originally founded under the Chicago Council (Later Chicago Area Council), it started on a land donation of 40 acres on Crystal Lake from the Whitehall Chamber of Commerce. Owasippe was originally founded as "A. Stamford White Scout Camps" after the Chairman of the Chicago Board of Trade, who was instrumental in the development of the initial encampments and acquisition of more property.

At the peak of its operation in 1974, Owasippe sat on 11,000 acres, operating 8 subcamps with an annual attendance of 10,000 campers per season. With Scouting's national fall in membership and participation starting in the 1980s Chicago Area Scouting also was affected by this. Unable to afford rising costs of operating with declining campership, Owasippe downsized operations and property.

The current reservation sits on 4,800 acres and is composed of 3 sub-camps within the property. The current operating sub-camps are Camp Blackhawk (Scouts BSA camp), Camp Wolverine (Scouts BSA and Cub Scouts), and Camp Reneker (Family Camp). There is also a high adventure base at Owasippe featuring a high ropes course, river trips on the White River, mountain biking, ATV courses, and a horse ranch.

Owasippe is currently staffed by 200 Scouters serving an average of 5,000 Scouts over 7 weeks every season.

=== Former camps ===
Camp Mach-Kin-O-Siew and Camp Shin-Go-Beek were former summer camps operated by Des Plaines Valley Council that were closed shortly after the merger. Camp Lakota, located in Woodstock, Illinois, was permanently closed on May 23, 2021.

==== Camp Napowan ====
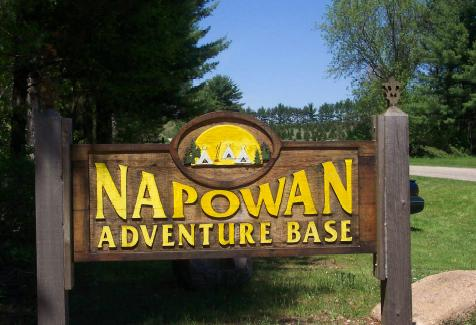
Camp Napowan entrance sign

Camp Napowan was a 400-acre Scouts BSA camp located in Wild Rose, Wisconsin. It was founded in the year 1946, formerly a tree farm. It is located between Hills Lake and Lake Napowan, with pine forests and a large variety of other trees surrounding the rest of the camp from its days as a logging operation. During the summer months, the camp operated an eight-week camping experience for scouts who stay for one- or two-week sessions. The camp typically drew around 2,000 campers each summer.

The camp staff lived on the grounds during the summer; in total there were usually over 70 staff members during the summer season. Harrison Ford worked in the Nature program area in 1957.

A new dining pavilion was constructed in 2009, with the dedication occurring on April 16, 2009. The camp's main office is located in the heart of the camp, near the main parade field. The camp has an enclosed dining hall near the main parade field with a full kitchen attached, usually used for cooking, and a larger dining pavilion used for serving meals.

Camp Napowan's program areas included: aquatics (swimming and boating), COPE (Climbing tower and High Adventure Course), nature, Skynet (STEM), shooting sports, Sherwood (Scoutcraft), Verona (performance and design), Flintlock (a mock 1870s frontier village that has handicraft), and Eagle Oasis (an area dedicated to advancing to the First Class rank).
