= Scouting in Illinois =

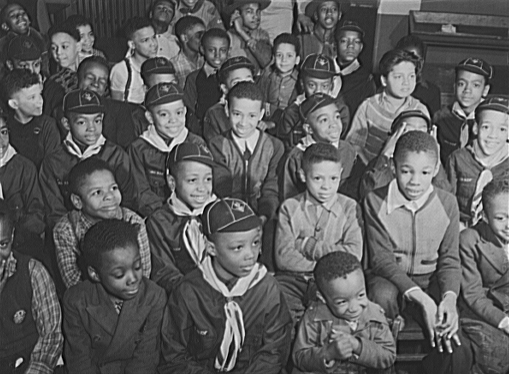
- A meeting of the Cub Scouts in the community center of the Ida B. Wells Homes in Chicago

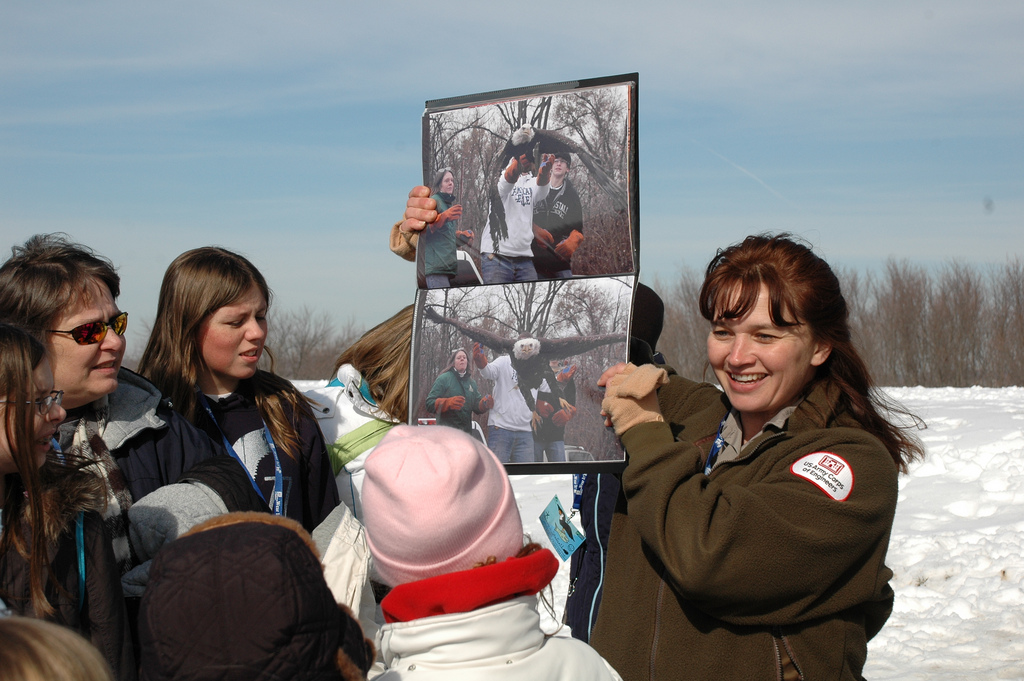
- Girl Scouts eagle watching on the Mississippi River at the National Great Rivers Museum

Scouting in Illinois has served youth since 1909. The state was the home of the Boy Scouts of America (BSA) founder, William D. Boyce.

== Early history (1910 – 1950) ==
In 1910–1913, Local Councils weorganized by any group of men in a community. Beginning in 1913, Local / Area Councils were chartered by the Boy Scouts of America. In 1946, the National Order of the Arrow Lodge Meeting was held at Chanute Field.

== Recent history (1950 – Present) ==
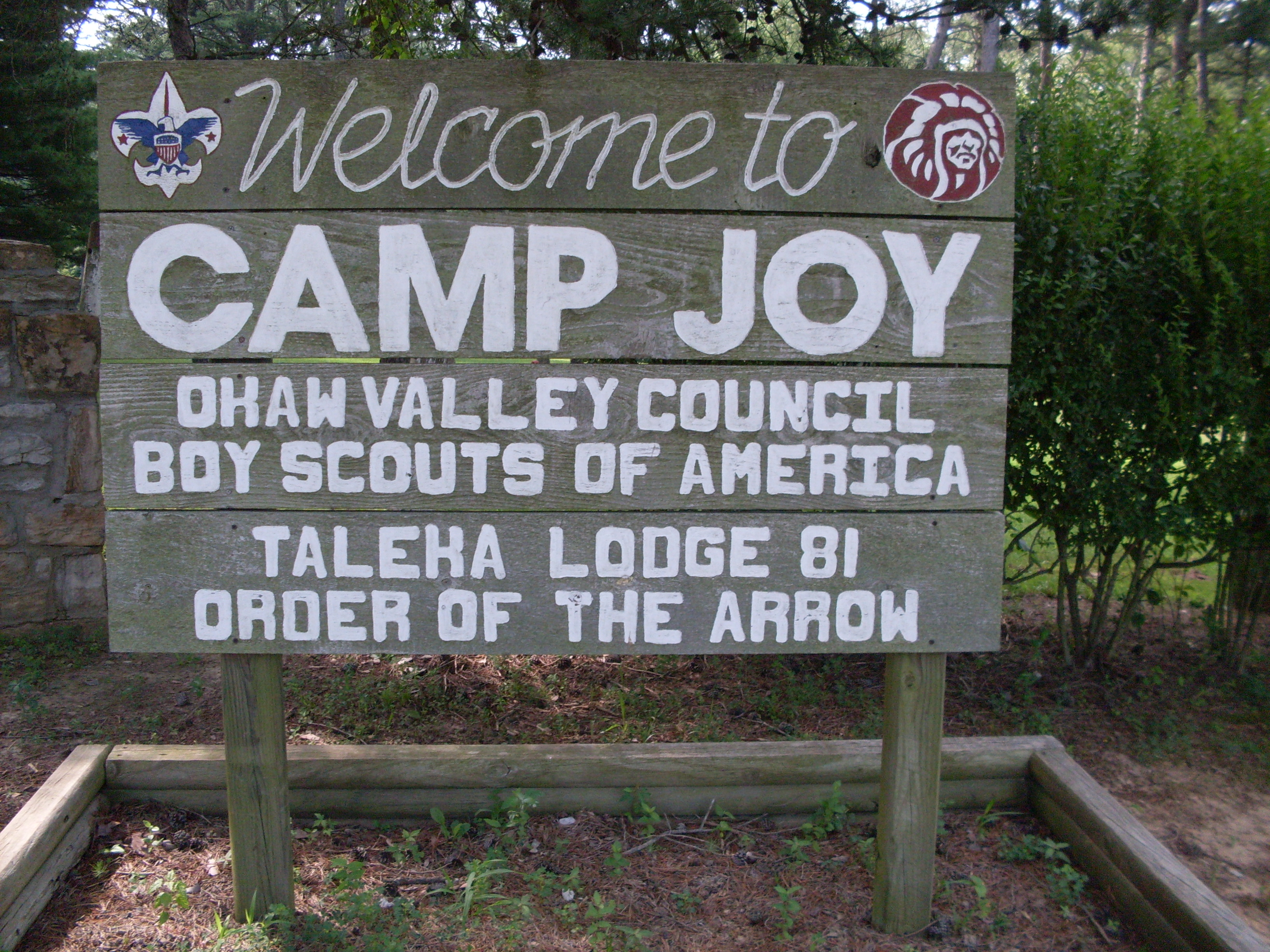
Sign at the entrance to Camp Joy

The 1963 and 1971 National Order of the Arrow Conferences were held at the University of Illinois at Urbana–Champaign.

In 2007, Lincoln Trails Council ran a Scoutreach program in inner city areas. Boys are offered constructive, fun activities and learn about scouting.

The Lewis and Clark Council was formed from the 2009 merger of Okaw Valley Council (OVC) and Trails West Council (TWC). The Lewis & Clark council had its headquarters in Belleville, Illinois. The council owned four camps: Camp Joy in Carlyle, Illinois, Camp Sunnen in Potosi, Missouri, Camp Warren Levis in Godfrey, Illinois, and Camp Vandeventer in Waterloo, Illinois. There were six districts in the Lewis & Clark Council: the Illini District, Black Gold District, Kaskaskia District, Cahokia Mounds District, Piasa Bird District, and St. Clair District. Okaw Valley Council and the Trails West Council merged in 2009 to create the Lewis & Clark Council.

The two councils from which Lewis & Clark was formed were themselves the product of mergers. The Trails West Council was founded in 1991 when the Piasa Bird Council and the Cahokia Mounds Council joined. The Okaw Valley Council was somewhat older at the time of the merger; it was formed in 1965 following the consolidation of the Kaskaskia Council and the Mississippi Valley Council.

In April 2014, the following councils announced that they would merge:

- Calumet Council
- Chicago Area Council
- Des Plaines Valley Council
- Northwest Suburban Council

The merged council was named the Pathway to Adventure Council.

In September 2016 the Lewis and Clark Council voted to merge with the Greater St. Louis Area Council, effective January 1, 2017.

The Lincoln Trails Council had its headquarters in Decatur, Illinois, and was served by Woapink Lodge #167 (founded in 1955). The council merged into the Greater Saint Louis Area Council on January 1, 2019.

== Boy Scouts of America Today ==
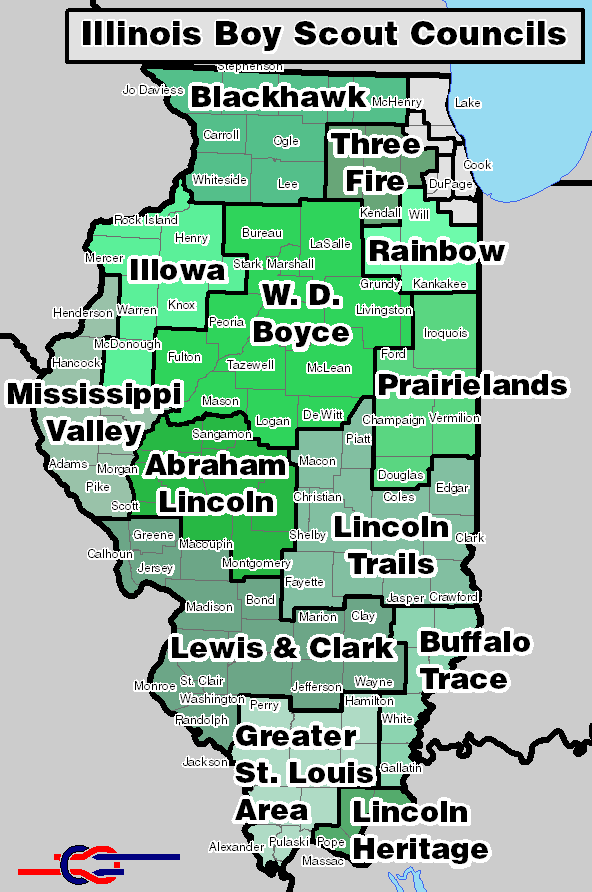
BSA Councils serving Illinois circa 2018

There are 14 Boy Scouts of America (BSA) local councils in Illinois.

== Councils ==
=== Abraham Lincoln Council ===
Abraham Lincoln Council is headquartered in Springfield, Illinois and serves central Illinois. It operates Camp Bunn in Hettick, Illinois, Camp Illinek in Springfield, Illinois and is served by the Illinek Order of the Arrow Lodge #132.

The three districts in the council are:

- Honest Abe District (serving Cass, Morgan, Scott & northern half of Green Counties)
- Lincoln Home District (serving Sangamon & Menard Counties)
- Log Cabin / Railsplitter District (serving Montgomery and the western 3/4 of Christian County & the northern half of Macoupin County)

The U.S. Scouting Service Project maintains the ScoutCamp.org website which provides general information and a place for leader comments on the two camps operated by the Abraham Lincoln Council at Camp Bunn and Camp Illinek.

=== Blackhawk Area Council ===
Blackhawk Area Council is headquartered in Rockford, Illinois and serves southwestern Wisconsin and northwestern Illinois. It operates Canyon Camp, located between Stockton and Apple River, Illinois, and Camp Lowden near Oregon, Illinois, and is served by Wulapeju Lodge #140. The council was formed by the merging of the U.S. Grant Council in the west and Blackhawk Council in the east portion of what is now the Blackhawk Area Council. Formerly, the two councils each had one camp. The council also owns a cabin in Mount Carroll, Illinois. The word Wulapeju (one spirit) refers to the merger of the Ma-ka-tai-me-she-kia-kiak (Chief Blackhawk's name) Lodge and Wetassa Lodge #227 as part of the council merger.

- Pioneer District (merge of Arrowhead and Wetassa Districts in 2022)
- Sycamore District
- Wanchanagi District
- White Eagle District

=== Buffalo Trace Council ===
Buffalo Trace Council is based in Evansville, Indiana that serves southwestern Indiana and southeastern Illinois. Its affiliated Order of the Arrow lodge is Kiondaga Lodge.

=== Glacier's Edge Council ===
Sinnissippi Council served Scouts in Wisconsin and Illinois, before it merged with Four Lakes Council. It is now called Glacier's Edge Council and is headquartered in Madison, Wisconsin.

=== Greater Saint Louis Area Council ===
The Greater Saint Louis Area Council is headquartered in Saint Louis, Missouri, and serves almost 70,000 Scouts in the Saint Louis metro area, southeast Missouri, southern Illinois, central Illinois, and eastern Illinois. The Greater Saint Louis Area Council merged with the Lewis and Clark Council in January 2017 and the Lincoln Trails Council in January 2019.

=== Illowa Council ===
The Illowa Council serves Scouts in western Illinois and eastern Iowa in the Quad Cities area with one camp, Loud Thunder Scout Reservation. Konepaka Ketiwa Lodge #38 (part of Section C-3A) is the Order of the Arrow lodge that serves this council.

- Hoover District
- Inali District
- Kittan District
- Mesquakie District
- Saukenuk District

=== Lincoln Heritage Council ===
Lincoln Heritage Council serves Scouts in Kentucky, Indiana, Illinois (Hardin, Massac, and Pope counties), and Tennessee.

=== Mississippi Valley Council ===
Mississippi Valley Council, headquartered in Quincy, Illinois, is served by Black Hawk Lodge 67. This council serves Scouts in Illinois, Missouri, and Iowa with two camps, Camp Saukenauk and Camp Eastman. The council merged in 1993 with the Saukee Area Council and the Southeastern Iowa Council.

=== Northeast Illinois Council ===
Northeast Illinois Council has its headquarters in Vernon Hills, Illinois. It runs Camp Sol R. Crown in Trevor, Wisconsin, Camp Oakarro near Wadsworth, Illinois, and Ma-Ka-Ja-Wan Scout Reservation near Pearson, Wisconsin. The council is served by Ma-Ka-Ja-Wan Lodge #40.

The Ma-Ka-Ja-Wan Scout Reservation is located in northern Wisconsin and serves the Scouts of the Northeast Illinois Council based in Vernon Hills, Illinois. Originally a logging camp, the scouts purchased the land and first had campers in 1929. The 1,560 acres (6 km^{2}) camp serves over 2,300 scouts each summer. Scouts attending Ma-Ka-Ja-Wan have the opportunity to work on merit badges, attend programs, and boat, swim, or fish on Lake Killian. Ma-Ka-Ja-Wan also operates a nationally accredited high adventure base that offers units 11 trek opportunities. Ma-Ka-Ja-Wan, as of 2014, had a perfect BSA accreditation rating.

Northeast Illinois Council is composed of three districts:

- Aptakisic District
- North Star District
- Potawatomi District

In addition, the council's Order of the Arrow lodge is split into three chapters with the same boundaries as its districts:

- Yakwahay Chapter (North Star)
- Namachani Chapter (Potawatomi)
- Aptakisic Chapter (Aptakisic)

=== Pathway to Adventure Council ===
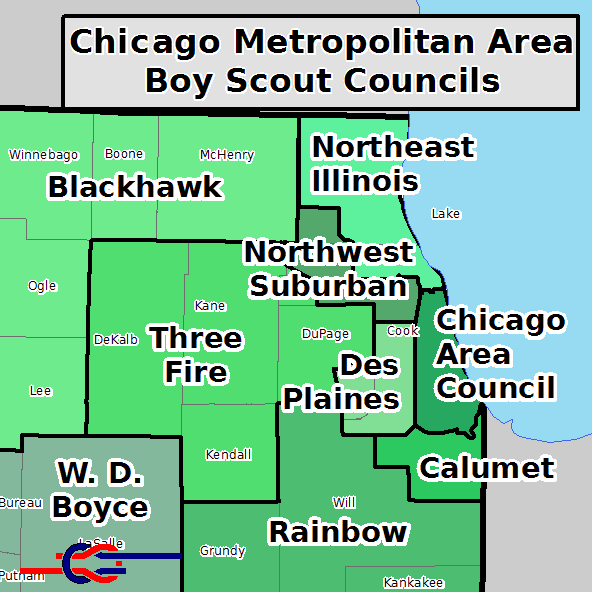
BSA Councils serving the Chicago area in early 2014

Pathway to Adventure Council is headquartered in Chicago, Illinois. On January 1, 2015, the Chicago Area Council, Des Plaines Valley Council, Northwest Suburban Council, and Calumet Council merged. Each of the predecessor councils have been reorganized as "Communities" with each maintaining their service centers as well as event and training schedules.

==== Camps ====
The council operates two camps: Camp Frank S. Betz in Berrien Springs, Michigan, and Owasippe Scout Reservation in Twin Lake, Michigan.

=== Prairielands Council ===
Prairielands Council serves Scouts in east central Illinois and western Indiana.

=== Rainbow Council ===
Rainbow Council is headquartered in Lockport, Illinois. It serves communities in Will, Grundy, and Kankakee counties. Rainbow Council operates Rainbow Scout Reservation (RSR) near Morris, Illinois. This over 600-acre property hosts year-round camping, including Scouts BSA and Cub Scout resident camping. RSR runs a Scouts BSA summer camp and Cub Scout resident camps each summer. Programs at RSR include a camper program, expanded programs for older scouts, and over 50 merit badges.

The council used to own and operated Camp Theakiki(sold 2023) near Kankakee, Illinois.

Rainbow Council is served by Waupecan Lodge #197.

- Ishkote District (South I 80)
- Waapi Lenaswa District (North I 80)

=== Three Fires Council ===
Three Fires Council
- Owner: Boy Scouts of America
- Location: St. Charles, Illinois
- Country: United States
- President: Brian W. Caputo Ph.D.
- Council Commissioner: David George
- Scout Executive: Ron Wentzell
- Website www.threefirescouncil.org

Three Fires Council is located in St. Charles, Illinois. In 1992, it was formed from the merger of Two Rivers Council and DuPage Area Council (named for DuPage County); it was briefly called "Two Rivers-DuPage Area Council." Its council service center is located in St. Charles, Illinois. Three Fires operates Camp Big Timber near Elgin, Illinois, and Scout Shops in St. Charles, Illinois, and Naperville, Illinois. The council is divided into 3 districts based on location.

==== Organization ====
- Chippewa District
- Ottawa District
- Potawatomi District

=== W. D. Boyce Council ===
The W. D. Boyce Council serves youth in central Illinois, from Lincoln to Ottawa, and Peoria to Bloomington.

== Girl Scouting in Illinois ==
There are five councils based in Illinois, though a small part of northern Winnebago County is served by Girl Scouts of Wisconsin - Badgerland Council

=== Girl Scouts of Central Illinois ===
Girl Scouts of Central Illinois
- Owner: GSUSA
- Headquarters: Springfield, Illinois
- Country: United States
- Chief Executive Officer: Pam Kovacevich
- Board Chair: Debra Wozniak
- Website www.getyourgirlpower.org

Girl Scouts of Central Illinois serves over 20,000 girls and has nearly 5,000 adult volunteers.

It was formed by the merger of Girl Scouts of Centrillio Council, Girl Scouts-Kickapoo Council, Girl Scouts of Two Rivers Council, Shemamo Girl Scout Council of Illinois, Girl Scouts, Land of Lincoln Council, and Girl Scouts of Green Meadows Council.

Regions:

- Bloomington covers Livingston, Logan and McLean counties
- Champaign covers Champaign, Douglas, Ford, Iroquois, and Vermillion counties
- Decatur covers Christian, DeWitt, Macon, Moultries, Piatt, and Shelby counties
- Peoria covers Marshall, Peoria, Stark, Tazewell, and Woodford counties
- Quincy covers Adams, Brown, Pike, and Schulyer counties
- Springfield covers Cass, Greene, Macoupin, Mason, Menard, Montgomery, Morgan, Sangamon, and Scott counties
- Macomb covers Fulton, Hancock, and McDonough counties
- Peru covers Bureau, LaSalle, and Putnam counties

=== Girl Scouts of Eastern Iowa and Western Illinois ===
Girl Scouts of Eastern Iowa and Western Illinois
- Owner: GSUSA
- Headquarters: Rock Island, Illinois
- Country: United States
- Chief Executive Officer: Diane Nelson
- Board Chair: Teresa Colgan
- Website girlscoutstoday.org

Girl Scouts of Eastern Iowa and Western Illinois serves 20,000 girls and has 5,000 adult volunteers in Eastern Iowa and Rock Island, Mercer, Henderson, Warren, Knox, Henry, and Jo Daviess counties in Illinois.

Formed by the merger of Girl Scouts of Conestoga Council, Girl Scouts Little Butt Council, Girl Scouts of the Mississippi Valley, and Girl Scouts of Shining Trail Council.

=== Girl Scouts of Greater Chicago and Northwest Indiana ===
Girl Scouts of Greater Chicago and Northwest Indiana
- Owner: GSUSA
- Headquarters: Chicago, Illinois
- Country: United States
- Chief Executive Officer: Nancy Wright
- President of the Board: Karen Layng
- Website www.girlscoutsgcnwi.org

Girl Scouts of Greater Chicago and Northwest Indiana serves more than 55,000 girls and 21,000 adult volunteers. It is the largest Girl Scout council by membership in the United States. It includes Cook, DuPage, Grundy, Kankakee, Lake and Will counties in Illinois and Jasper, Lake, Newton, and Porter counties in Indiana.

It was formed by the merger of Girl Scouts of the Calumet Council Indiana, Girl Scouts of Chicago, Drifting Dunes Girl Scout Council, Girl Scouts of DuPage County Council, Girl Scouts — Illinois Crossroads Council, Girl Scouts — Prairie Winds, Girl Scouts of South Cook County, and Girl Scouts of Trailways Council on July 1, 2008.

=== Girl Scouts of Northern Illinois ===
Girl Scouts of Northern Illinois
- Owner: GSUSA
- Country: United States
- Chief Executive Officer: Fiona Cummings
- Board Chair: Lisa Normoyle
- Website www.girlscoutsni.org

Girl Scouts of Northern Illinois was formed on October 1, 2009, from a merger of Fox Valley, Rock River Valley, Green Hills, and Sybaquay councils. The council serves Kane, Kendall, McHenry, DeKalb, Boone, Winnebago, Stephenson, Ogle, Lee, Jo Daviess, Carroll and Whiteside counties.

=== Girl Scouts of Southern Illinois ===
Girl Scouts of Southern Illinois
- Owner: GSUSA
- Headquarters: Glen Carbon, Illinois
- Country: United States
- Chief Executive Officer: Villie M. Appoo
- Board Chair: Dixie Travelstead
- Website www.gsofsi.org

The council serves around 14,000 girls in southern Illinois. It was formed in October 2009 from a merger of River Bluffs and Shagbark Councils.

== Scouting museums in Illinois ==
- Ottawa Scouting Museum, Ottawa, Illinois

== International Scouting units in Illinois ==
There were Belarusian Scouts in Exile in Chicago through the 1980s, and Lietuvos skautų sąjunga still exists there. Külföldi Magyar Cserkészszövetség Hungarian Scouting also maintains a troop in Chicago and there are large contingents of active Plast Ukrainian Scouts in Chicago.
