= Miami Valley Council =

Local council of the Boy Scouts of America

Miami Valley Council (#444)
- Owner: Boy Scouts of America
- Headquarters: Dayton, Ohio
- Country: United States
- Website www.miamivalleybsa.org

The Miami Valley Council is a local council of the Boy Scouts of America and serves Darke, Preble, Miami, Shelby and Montgomery counties in Ohio.

== Organization ==
Prior to June 1, 2014, Miami Valley Council was divided into six districts. There were four rural districts: Darke District, Miami District, Preble District, and Shelby District, each named for the county in which they were located. There were two urban districts: Sunwatch District, which roughly covered the northern half of Montgomery County, and Wright Brothers District, which roughly covered the southern half.

Part of the 2012-2014 Miami Valley Council Strategic Plan called for the council to review its district structure. A District Realignment Proposal was approved by the Miami Valley Council Executive Board in November 2013, and took effect on June 1, 2014, reducing the total number of districts from six to four. As a result of the realignment, the former Miami and Shelby Districts were merged into a single, new district known as Two Rivers District, while the former Darke and Preble Districts merged into Wayne Trace District. The Sunwatch and Wright Brothers Districts were not affected.

As of June 1, 2014, the four districts of Miami Valley Council are Two Rivers District, Wayne Trace District, Sunwatch District, and Wright Brothers District.

== History ==
the council has changed throughout the years.

Dayton Council #444 founded 1916
Dayton-Miami Valley Council #444 merged 1929
Miami Valley Council #444 renamed 1949

Piqua Council #456 founded 1920

== Camps ==
=== Woodland Trails Scout Reservation ===
Woodland Trails Scout Reservation was the Miami Valley Council's year-round camping facility. It was located on a 1,000-acre (4.0 km^{2}) spread of hardwood forests, fields, and streams. As of April 23, 2022 the council no longer operates the camp and is in negotiations to sell the property.

Woodland Trails Scout Reservation
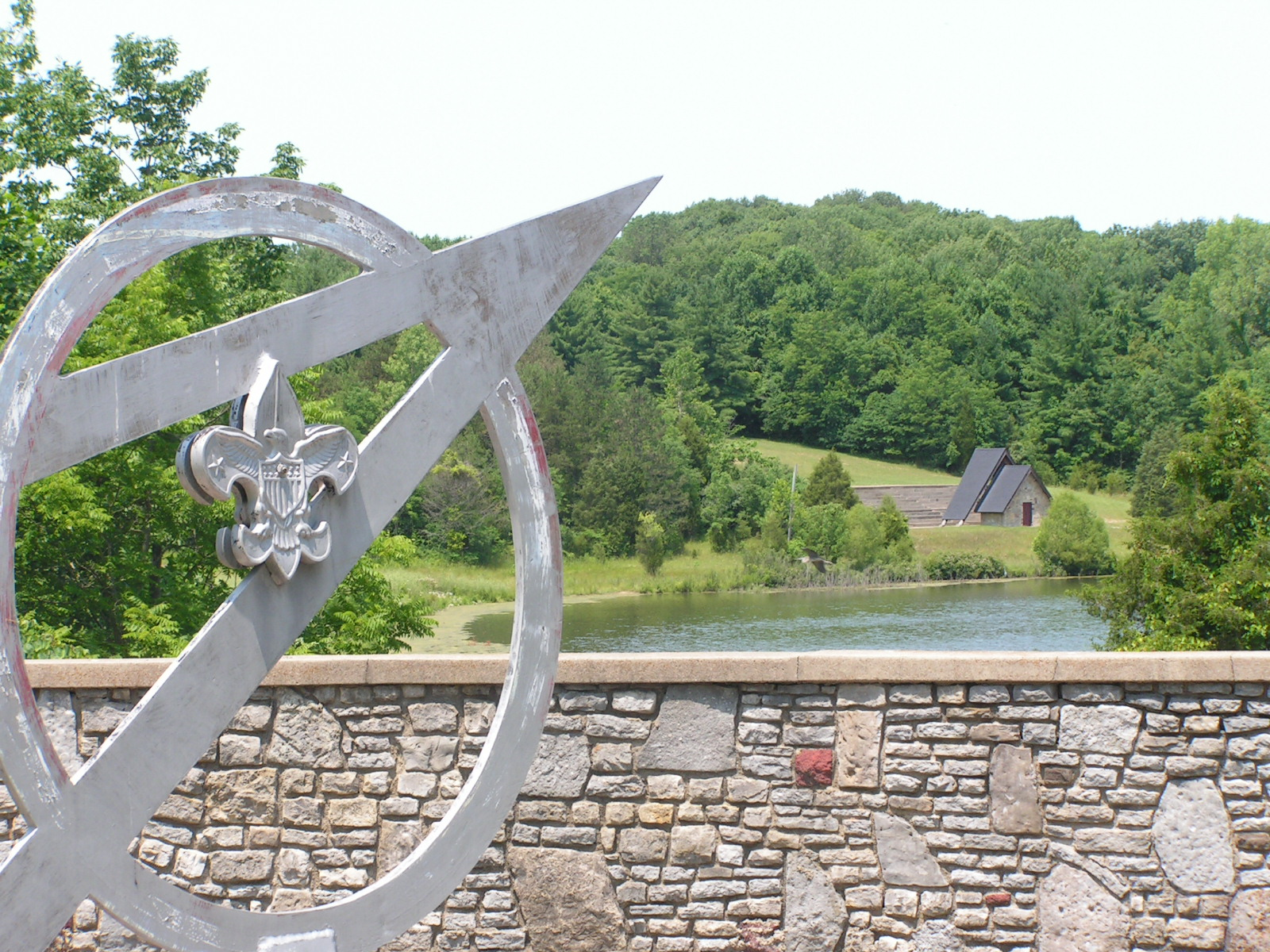
- Woodland Trails Scenic Overlook
- Owner: Miami Valley Council, Boy Scouts of America
- Location: Camden, Ohio
- Country: United States
- Coordinates: 39°39′21″N 84°38′41″W
- Founded: 1959
- Website www.woodlandtrails.org

==== History ====
At the start of the 1950s, the Miami Valley Council of the Boy Scouts of America operated one camp, Cricket Holler Scout Camp. This camp is located in Butler Township, a community approximately 10 miles (16 km) north of Dayton, Ohio. Cricket Holler was established in 1919 and occupies 160 acres (0.65 km^{2}) of forested land. Due to the vast increase in the number of boys joining the Scouting movement in the Dayton area at that time, Cricket Holler could no longer adequately meet the burgeoning needs of the area's scouts, so the council leadership began to look for a large tract of land which could better serve the region's young men. In 1958, the Miami Valley Council succeeded in purchasing just over 2,000 acres (8.1 km^{2}) of land on the northern outskirts of the village of Camden in Preble County.

===== 1959 =====
The new scout reservation was originally planned to be a massive property divided into two camps for resident and day camping activities. Each camp would have its own man-made lake with campsites and other necessary buildings and support structures. Financial shortfalls and a decline in membership lead to the eventual abandonment of this master plan, with only the eastern camp being developed for summer resident camping purposes. By June 1959, there existed a new road cut into the interior of the camp, a food preparation building, the swimming pool and the spillway which would soon protect the waters of Mystic Lake. A name for the new property had not yet been selected, so for the first year it was simply referred to as "Miami Valley Scout Reservation."

With only a short time to prepare for the summer season, much of the property was still being developed as campers arrived. With the spillway construction only finished in early June, Mystic Lake was only about 1/3 filled, requiring boats to be carried across more than 50 yards of mud and tree stumps to reach the waterfront. Water lines across camp were limited, and were being run as required to accommodate the greatest need. Roads and campsites were established using a bulldozer with no specific plan. Initially 11 campsites were constructed, but each was nothing more than a cleared area with no physical structures. As much of the property was active farmland until 1958, there were few trees to speak of. Campers and staff planted young trees to help establish the current hardwood forest that covers Woodland Trails.

===== 1960 - 1989 =====
In 1960, the property was officially named Woodland Trails Scout Reservation. 12 additional campsites were built, establishing a total of 23 areas each equipped with a pavilion, kybo, and wash stand. Buildings such as the chapel, an 18-foot (5.5 m) climbing tower, Dittmar Ecology Center, 32-pole flag quadrangle, Herb Smith craft area, Pointner Lodge and a water tower were constructed. With these facilities, the camp flourished as one of the finest in Ohio. Originally, there was no dining hall; units practiced the traditional "patrol cooking" method, serviced by the camp commissary. As the years progressed, Pointner Lodge was developed into the camp's dining hall. Because of size constraints, this facility was not able to accommodate the entire camp at one time, requiring units to eat in shifts and pavilion tents to be set up outside to add to the seating capacity.

===== 1990 - 1999 =====
In 1990, the Miami Valley Council and the Dan Beard Council in Cincinnati completed the construction of a new dining hall. This was the last major joint venture between the organizations, as the Dan Beard Council received a large monetary gift and re-opened Camp Friedlander later in the decade. In 1991, Woodland Trails opened a new Project COPE course in the southern area of the property. In the fall of 1999, the dam holding back the waters of Mystic Lake was found to be unstable, and the lake was subsequently drained for nearly two years to complete repairs.

===== 2000 - present =====
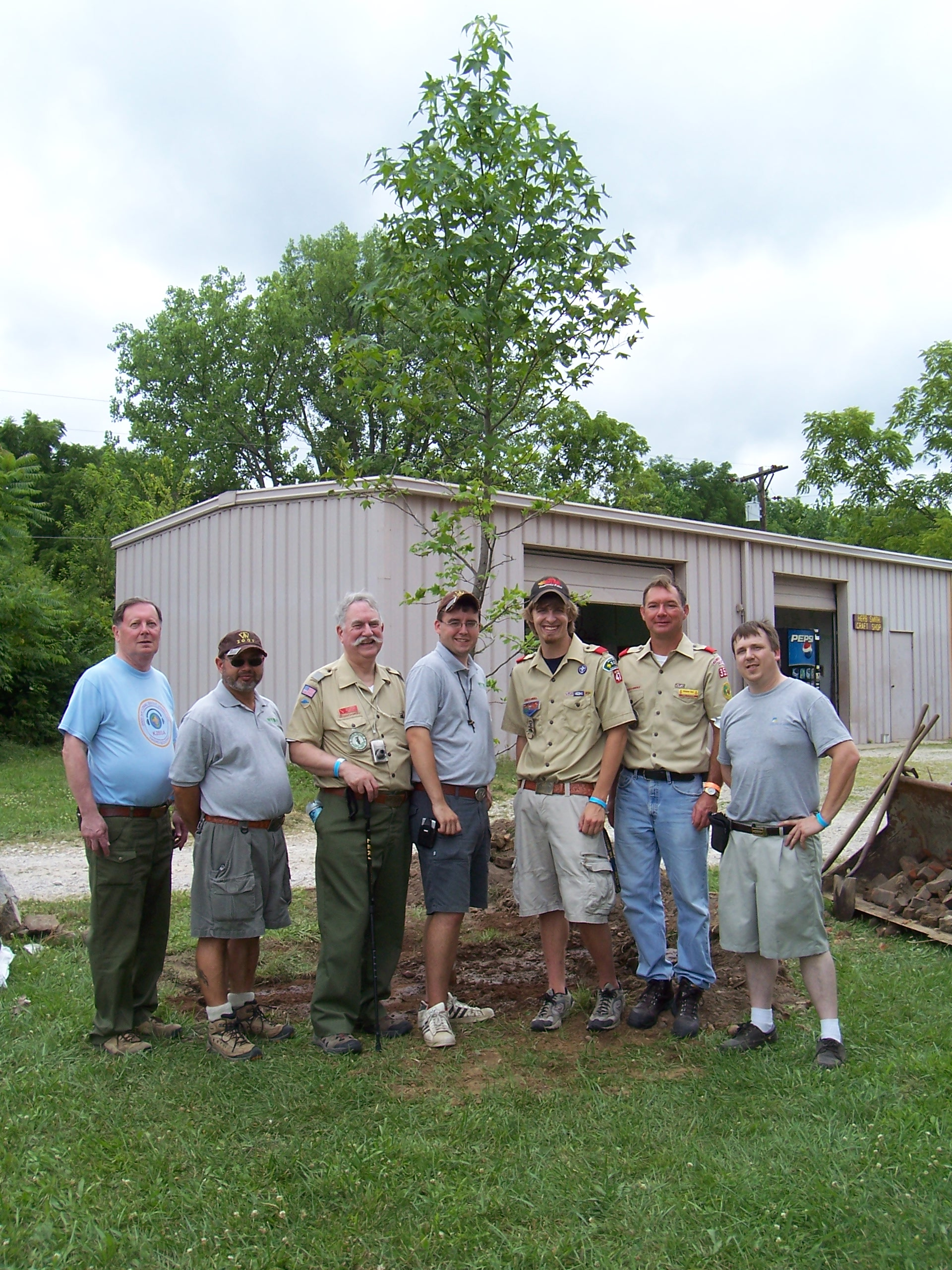
A tree was planted commemorating the 50th anniversary of Woodland Trails. Former campers and staff alumni stand in the foreground.

In 2000, the Miami Valley Council sold approximately 710 acres (2.9 km^{2}) of the original 2,000-acre (8.1 km^{2}) property to the Ohio Department of Natural Resources to form the Woodland Trails Wildlife Area. This transaction provided a solid financial foundation, allowing the council to rebuild its endowment fund and to retain ownership of Cricket Holler Scout Camp in Dayton. With the repairs to the spillway complete, Mystic Lake was filled once again and reestablished as Four Eagles Lake to honor the benefactors responsible for the donations to the repair efforts. In 2002, a new 55-foot (17 m) climbing and rappelling tower was constructed, spearheaded by Miami Lodge #495 of the Order of the Arrow. In 2002, the Wilbur Shoup Activity Center was donated by Dayton Power and Light, serving as a central meeting place in camp during the summer season. The camp celebrated its 50th anniversary in the summer of 2009 with the motto "Fifty Years of Service".

On November 8, 2021, the Miami Valley Council announced that the camp would be sold in its entirety due do fiscal concerns as a result of continuing declining membership and participation as well as a requirement to contribute to the national trust fund resulting from a class action lawsuit against the Boy Scouts of America regarding abuses of youth by adult leaders over many decades.

==== Campsites ====
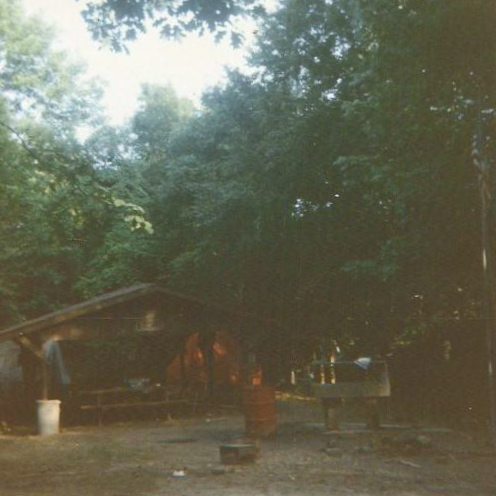
Crow's Nest. Each campsite is equipped with a pavilion, kybo, and wash stand.

- Anthony Wayne
- Baden Powell
- Barringer Ridge
- Blackberry Hill
- Broken Arrow
- Buckeye
- Bud Westendorf
- Buzzard's Roost
- Crow's Nest
- Daniel Boone
- Davy Crockett
- Eagle's Nest
- Foxboro
- Frank Hess
- George Rogers Clark
- Green Meadows
- Kit Carson
- Pioneer
- Raccoon Ridge
- Sam Houston
- Sleepy Hollow
- Surfside
- Tecumseh

==== Facilities ====
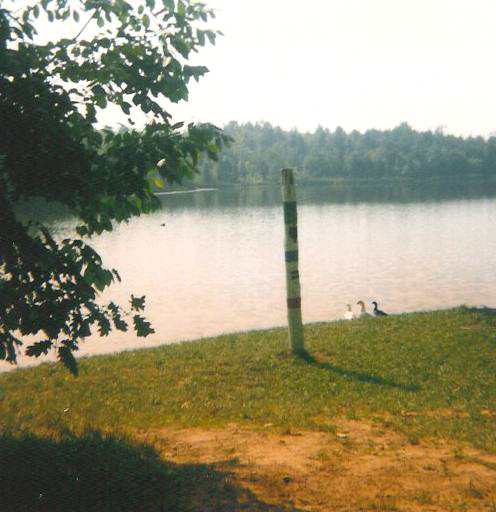
The lakeside council ring is used for campfire programs and Order of the Arrow ceremonies.

- Administration Center
- Chapel
- Climbing/Rappelling Tower
- Council Ring
- Dining Hall
- Ecology & Conservation Center
- First-Year Camper Pavilion
- Flag Quadrangle
- Handicraft Building
- Horse Ranch
- Lakefront and Dock
- North Shower House
- Pool and Shower House
- Scoutcraft Center
- Shooting Sports Ranges (Archery, Rifle, Shotgun)
- Sports Center and Fields
- Trading Post
- Science, Technology, Engineering, and Mathematics Center

=== Cricket Holler Scout Camp ===
Cricket Holler Scout Camp
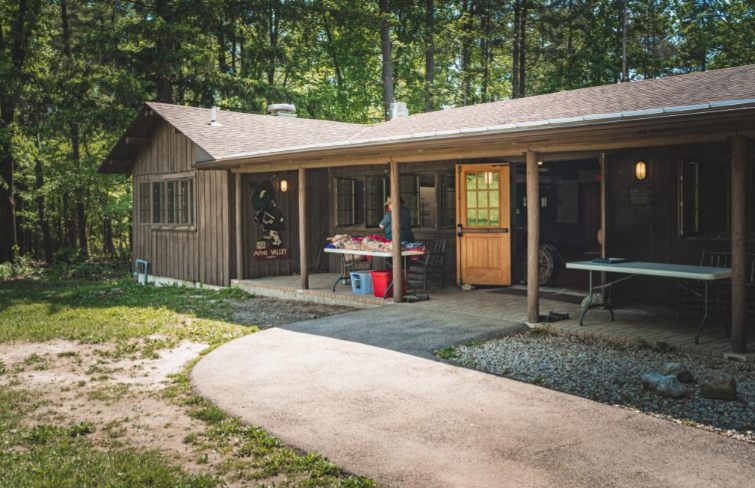
- Kiwanis Lodge During Scout Event
- Owner: Miami Valley Council, Boy Scouts of America
- Location: Dayton, Ohio
- Country: United States
- Website https://campreservation.com/444/Camps/374

The Miami Valley Council also operates Cricket Holler Scout Camp, located in Dayton, Ohio. Cricket Holler was the first camp built by the Miami Valley Council in 1919. It operates on a roughly 135-acre lot, full of trails, streams, and woods. The Camp's main entrance is on Cricket Holler Dr. E, and it leads down to the camp ranger's cabin and the main parking lot. The road is connected to a paved section that leads to the K-Lodge and eventually to the main trails.

==== Kiwanis Lodge (K-Lodge) ====
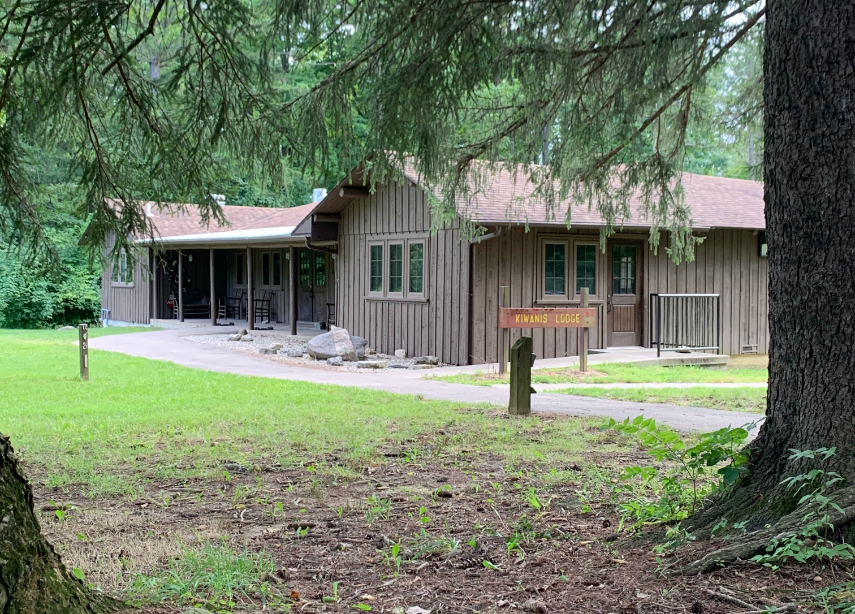
The K-Lodge, Built In 1945

An open and well-kept building, the Kiwanis Lodge, or K-Lodge was built in 1945, as donated by The Dayton Kiwanis Club. It has a large open room that branches, a large kitchen, bathrooms, and a couple storage closets. Shaped like an H from above, the K-Lodge faces an open field, with a large flagpole to the left and the newly renovated shower house to the right. Behind it are two openings to trails that run throughout the camp. The K-Lodge was designed for scouting gatherings and to host a multitude of large-scale events.

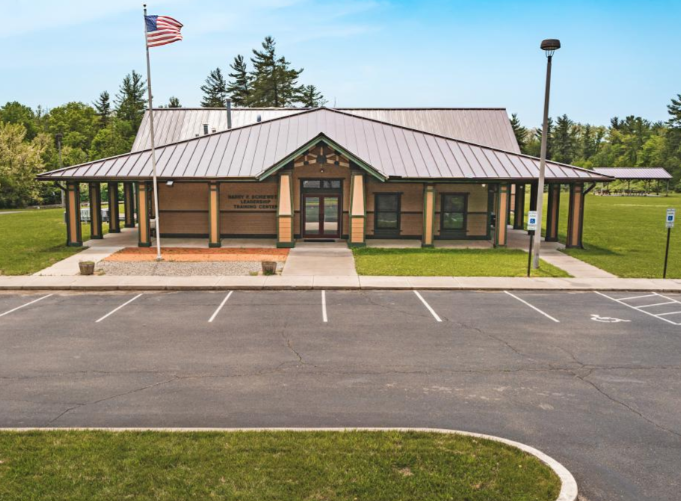
The Lodge's Main Entrance

==== Schiewetz Leadership Training Center ====
The Schiewetz Leadership Training Center is designed to support corporate as well as scouting needs for meetings, trainings, and social gatherings. The training center itself offers one large dividable conference room, 3 classrooms, and a kitchen. The training center is supported by 4 cabins down the hill. Open fields and a parking lot surround the building.

===== Campsites =====
- Dan Beard
- Dan Boone
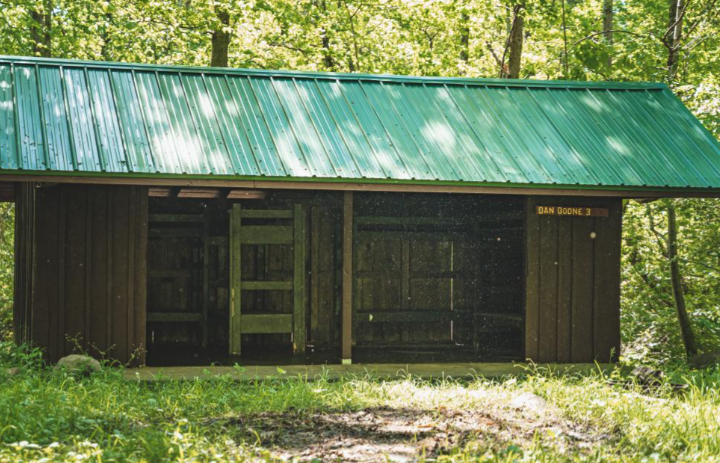
  Shelter 3 At Campsite Dan Boone
- Locust Grove
- Miami
- Sioux
- Treaty
- Winnebago
- Wyandotte
- Pequa (Not Used)
- Pawnee (Not Used)
- Frontier (Not Used)

===== Shelters =====
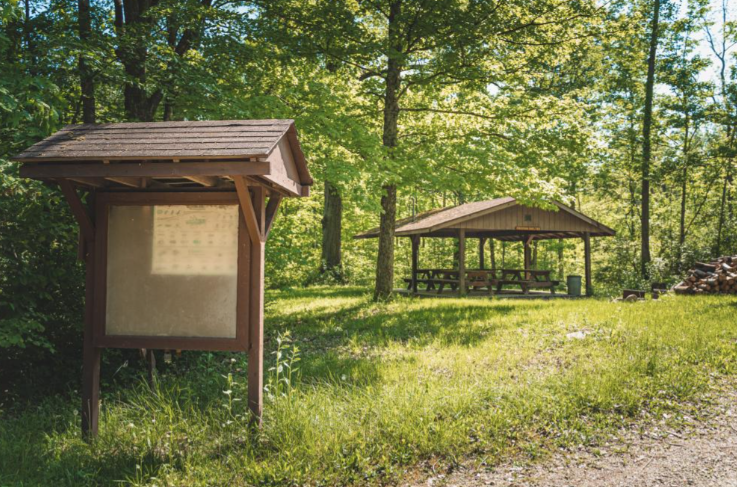
The Freeman Shelter

- Freeman Shelter
- Locust Grove Shelter
- T-Shelter (Not Used)

===== Facilities =====
- Chapel

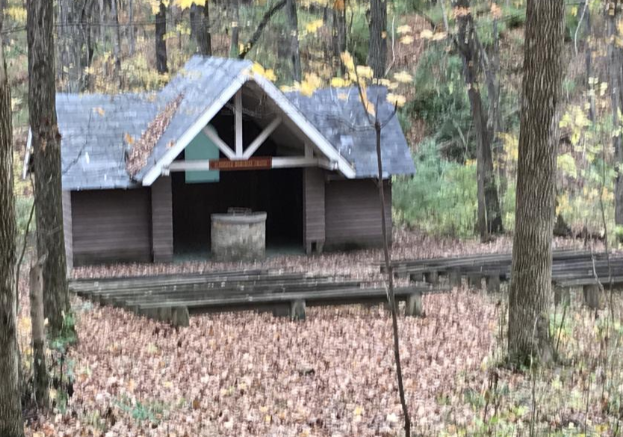
Chapel

- Dubbing Field
- Sports Field
- K-Lodge Field
- Shower House
- T-Lodge (Training Lodge)
- Council Ring
- Maintenance Barn
- BB & Archery Range
- Bird Tree (Not Used)
- Old Council Ring (Not Used)

== Order of the Arrow ==
Miami Lodge is the Order of the Arrow lodge that serves the council.

== Controversial Alumni ==
In September 2018, former Scout Executive George Douglas Nelson was arrested for allegedly transferring council funds to the Miami Valley Council, his former council, to purchase a personal vehicle. He was charged with disbursing charitable funds for personal gain, wire fraud, and forgery. In 2019, Nelson pleaded guilty to forgery, was sentenced to 2 years of probation and ordered to pay restitution to the Northeast Illinois Council.
