= Elcho, Wisconsin =

- Town
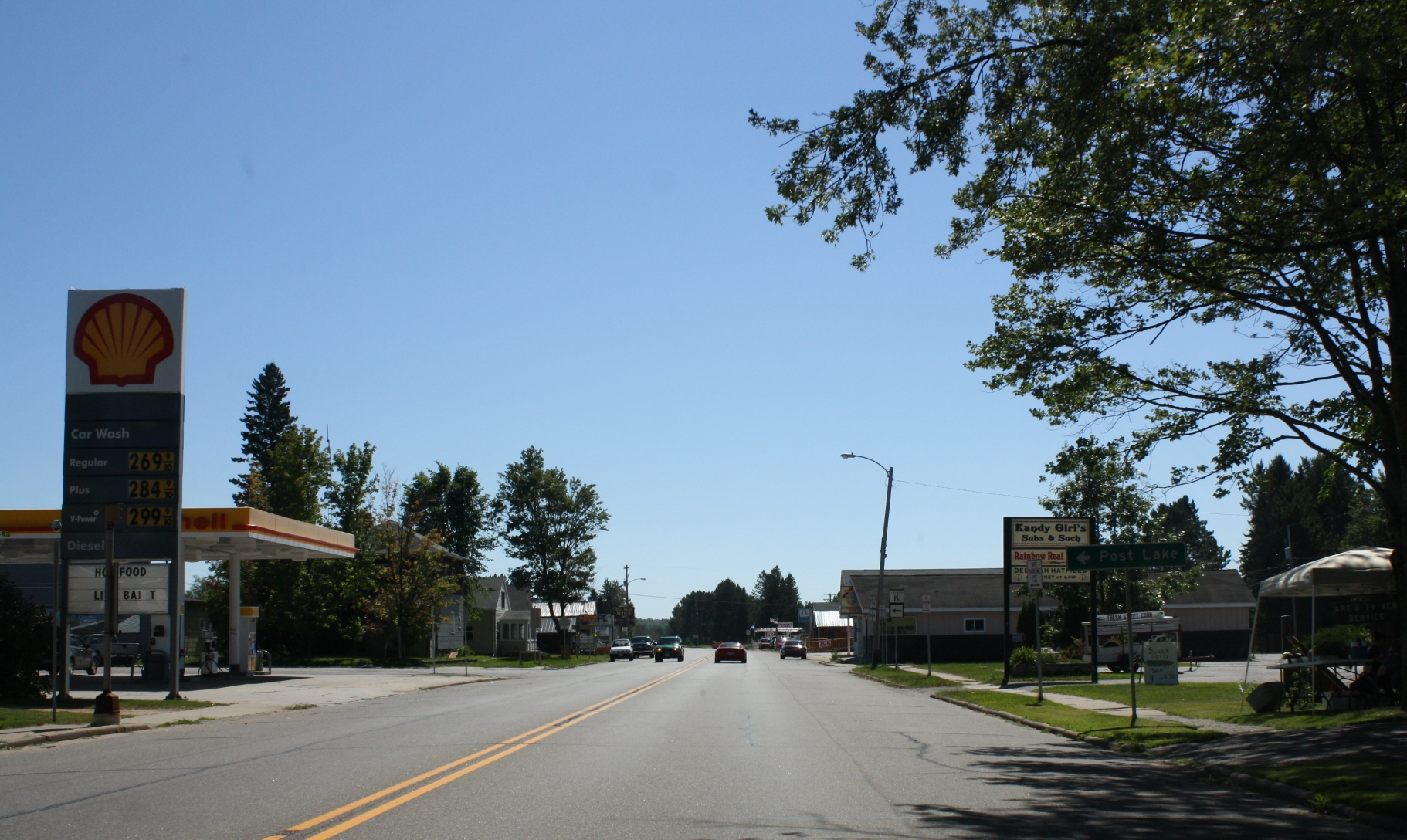
- Downtown in unincorporated Elcho

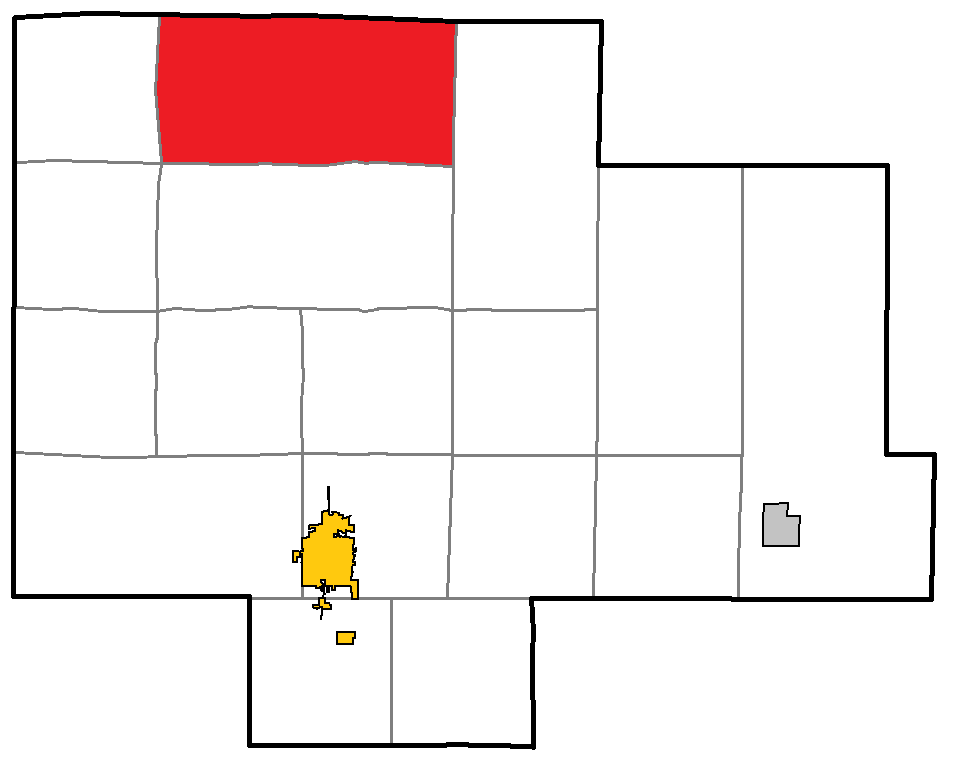
- Location of Elcho, within Langlade County
- Coordinates: 45°26′19″N 89°10′6″W
- Country: United States
- State: Wisconsin
- County: Langlade

Area
  - Total: 75.2 sq mi (194.8 km^{2})
  - Land: 71.0 sq mi (183.8 km^{2})
  - Water: 4.2 sq mi (11 km^{2})
- Elevation: 1,610 ft (490 m)

Population (2020)
  - Total: 1,168
  - Density: 16.46/sq mi (6.355/km^{2})
- Time zone: UTC-6 (Central (CST))
  - Summer (DST): UTC-5 (CDT)
- ZIP Codes: 54428 (Elcho; 54485 (Summit Lake)
- Area codes: 715 & 534
- FIPS code: 55-23050
- GNIS feature ID: 1583142
- Website: https://www.townofelcho.com/

Elcho is a town in Langlade County, Wisconsin, United States. The population was 1,168 at the 2020 census. The census-designated places of Elcho, Post Lake, and part of Summit Lake are located in the town.

The area is served by the Elcho Fire and Rescue Department.

== History ==
A post office called Elcho has been in operation since 1887. Elcho was named after a place in Scotland. A Boy Scout camp, Camp Mach-Kin-O-Siew (a.k.a. Camp Mach), was located in Elcho.

== Geography ==
Elcho is in northern Langlade County, bordered to the north by Oneida County. The town is in the geographical region of Wisconsin known as the Northern Highland. The community of Elcho is in the center of the town, while Post Lake is in the east and Summit Lake is on the southern border.

According to the United States Census Bureau, the town has a total area of 75.2 square miles (194.8 km^{2}), of which 71.0 square miles (183.8 km^{2}) are land and 4.2 square miles (11 km^{2}), or 5.64%, are water. Upper and Lower Post Lake are in the northeast corner of the town, on the Wolf River. The Hunting River rises in the northern part of town at Otter Lake next to the community of Elcho and drains the central part of the town before flowing southeast to the Wolf River at Pearson. The Prairie River, a tributary of the Wisconsin River, drains the western part of the town, except for the northwest corner, where Enterprise Lake feeds Enterprise Creek, which flows north toward the Pelican River, a separate tributary of the Wisconsin River.

== Demographics ==
As of the census of 2000, there were 1,317 people, 613 households, and 397 families residing in the town. The population density was 18.5 people per square mile (7.1/km^{2}). There were 1,370 housing units at an average density of 19.2 per square mile (7.4/km^{2}). The racial makeup of the town was 98.71% White, 0.08% African American, 0.08% Native American, 0.15% Asian, and 0.99% from two or more races. Hispanic or Latino people of any race were 0.23% of the population.

There were 613 households, out of which 17.5% had children under the age of 18 living with them, 56.3% were married couples living together, 5.1% had a female householder with no husband present, and 35.1% were non-families. 30.2% of all households were made up of individuals, and 15% had someone living alone who was 65 years of age or older. The average household size was 2.15 and the average family size was 2.64.

In the town, the population was spread out, with 18% under the age of 18, 4.3% from 18 to 24, 20.5% from 25 to 44, 30.5% from 45 to 64, and 26.7% who were 65 years of age or older. The median age was 51 years. For every 100 females age 18 and over, there were 100.7 males.

The median income for a household in the town was $29,010, and the median income for a family was $36,000. Males had a median income of $27,262 versus $19,327 for females. The per capita income for the town was $17,016. About 7.5% of families and 9% of the population were below the poverty line, including 5.7% of those under age 18 and 6% of those age 65 or over.
