= Elcho (CDP), Wisconsin =

Census-designated place in Wisconsin, United States

Elcho, Wisconsin
- Census-designated place
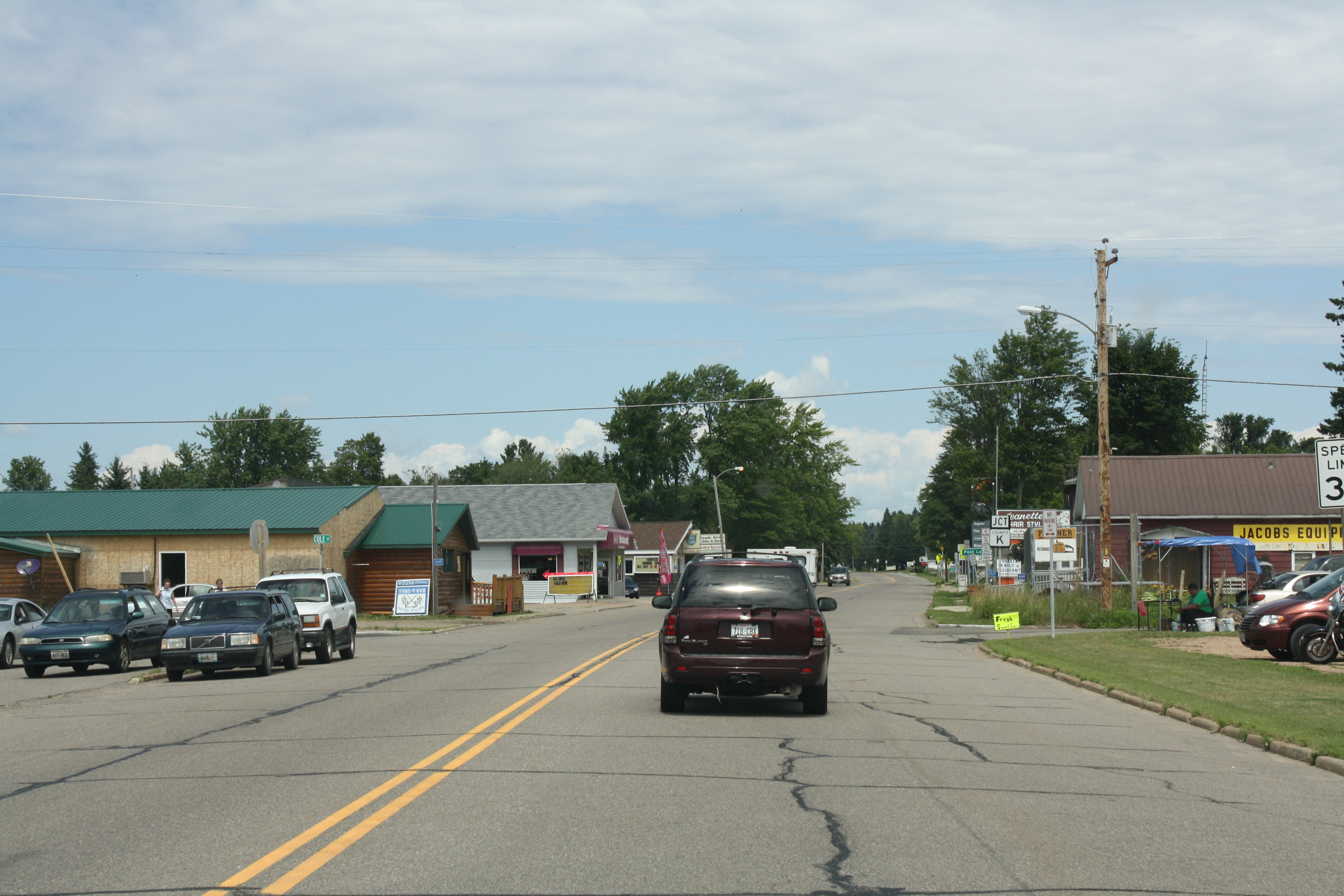
- Looking north at downtown Elcho

- Location within Wisconsin Location within the United States
- Coordinates: 45°26′09″N 89°11′00″W
- Country: United States
- State: Wisconsin
- County: Langlade
- Town: Elcho

Area
  - Total: 1.199 sq mi (3.11 km^{2})
  - Land: 1.063 sq mi (2.75 km^{2})
  - Water: 0.136 sq mi (0.35 km^{2})
- Elevation: 1,631 ft (497 m)

Population (2020)
  - Total: 327
  - Density: 308/sq mi (119/km^{2})
- Time zone: UTC-6 (Central (CST))
  - Summer (DST): UTC-5 (CDT)
- ZIP code: 54428
- Area codes: 715 & 534
- GNIS feature ID: 1564493
- FIPS code: 55-23025

Elcho is an unincorporated community and census-designated place (CDP) in the town of Elcho, Langlade County, Wisconsin, United States. Elcho is located on U.S. Route 45 and Wisconsin Highway 47, 16.5 miles (26.6 km) southwest of Crandon. Elcho has a post office with ZIP code 54428. As of the 2020 census, its population was 327, down from 339 at the 2010 census.

== Images ==
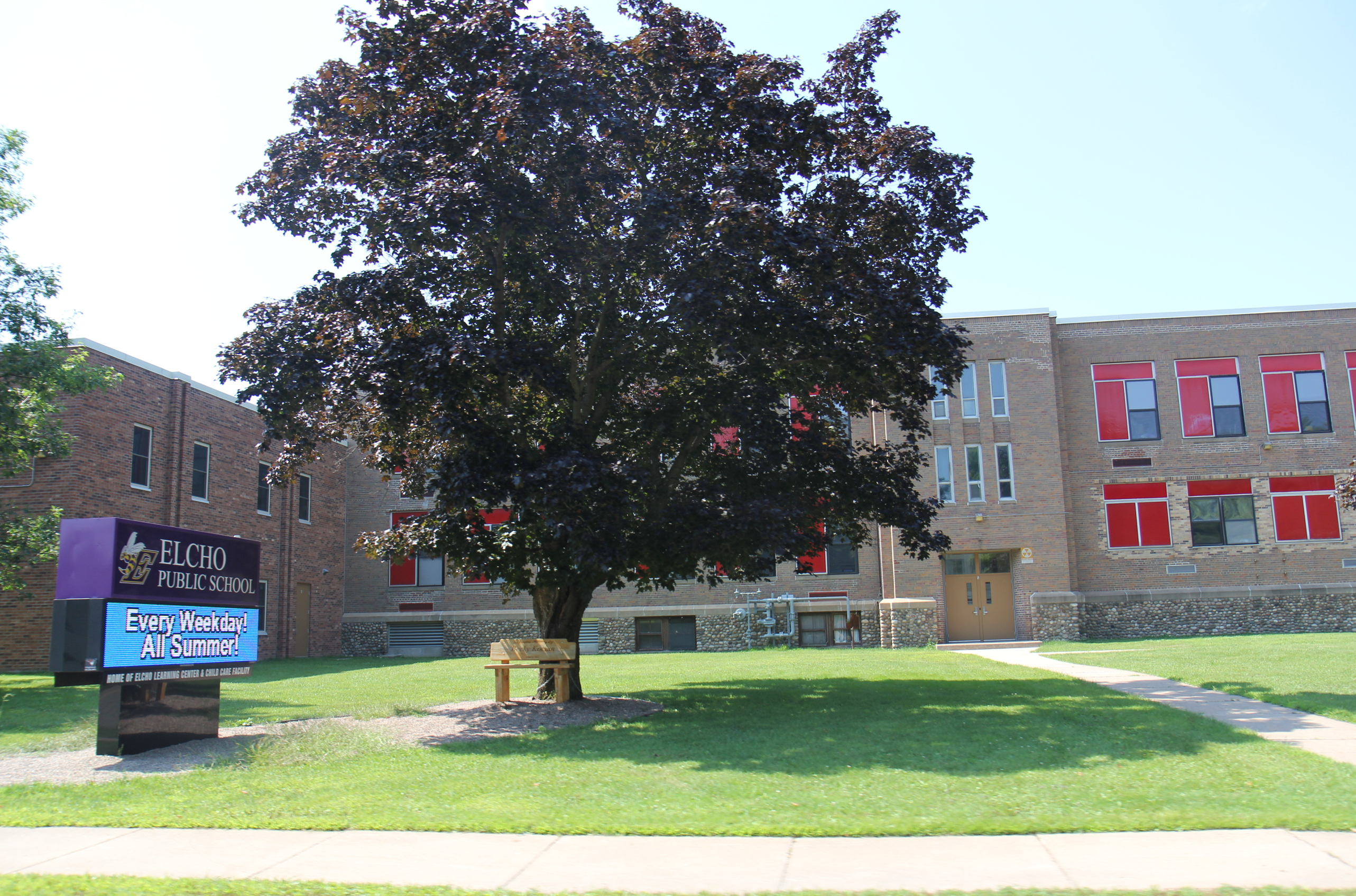
Elcho School

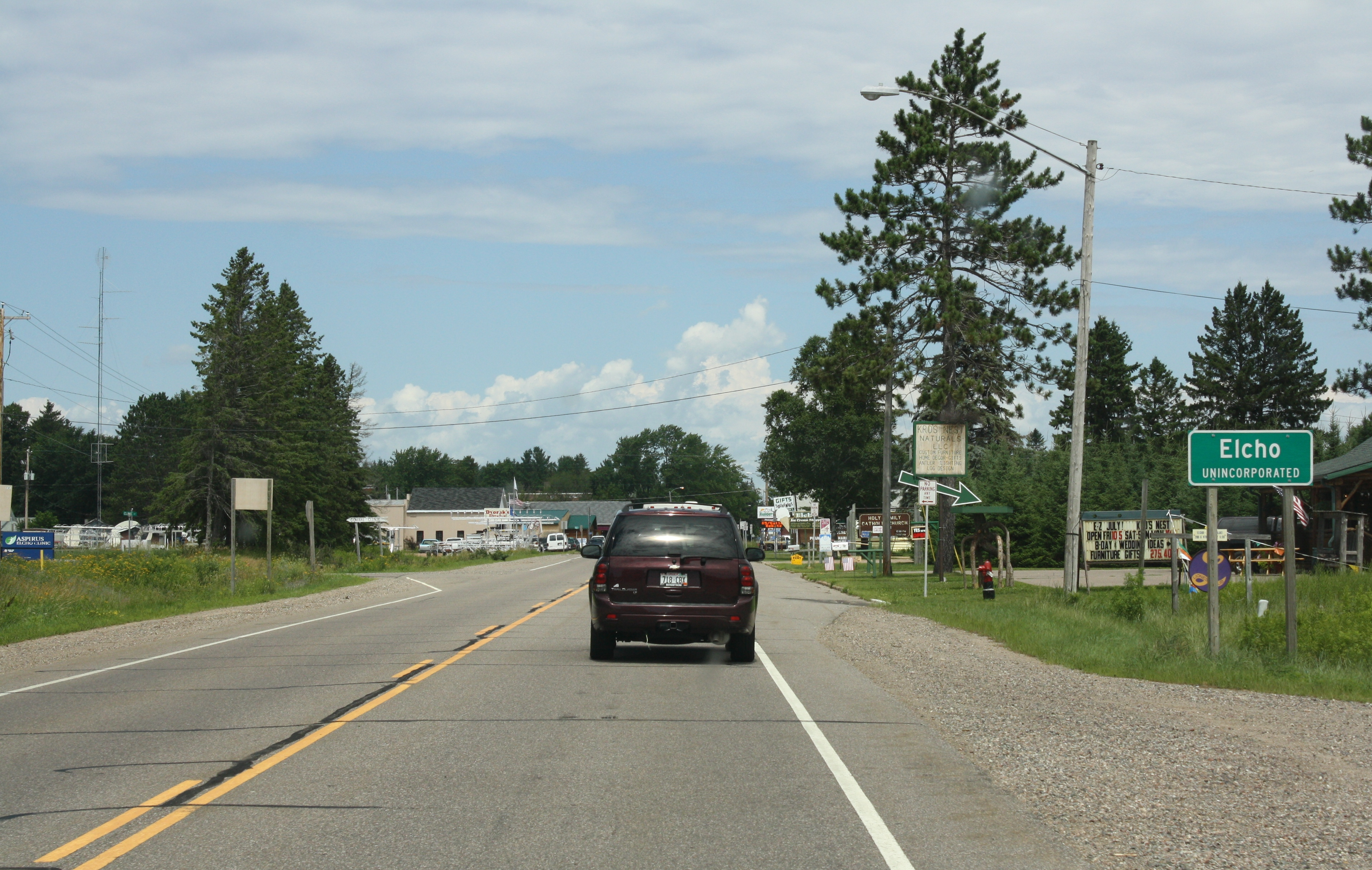
Elcho sign on U.S. Route 45

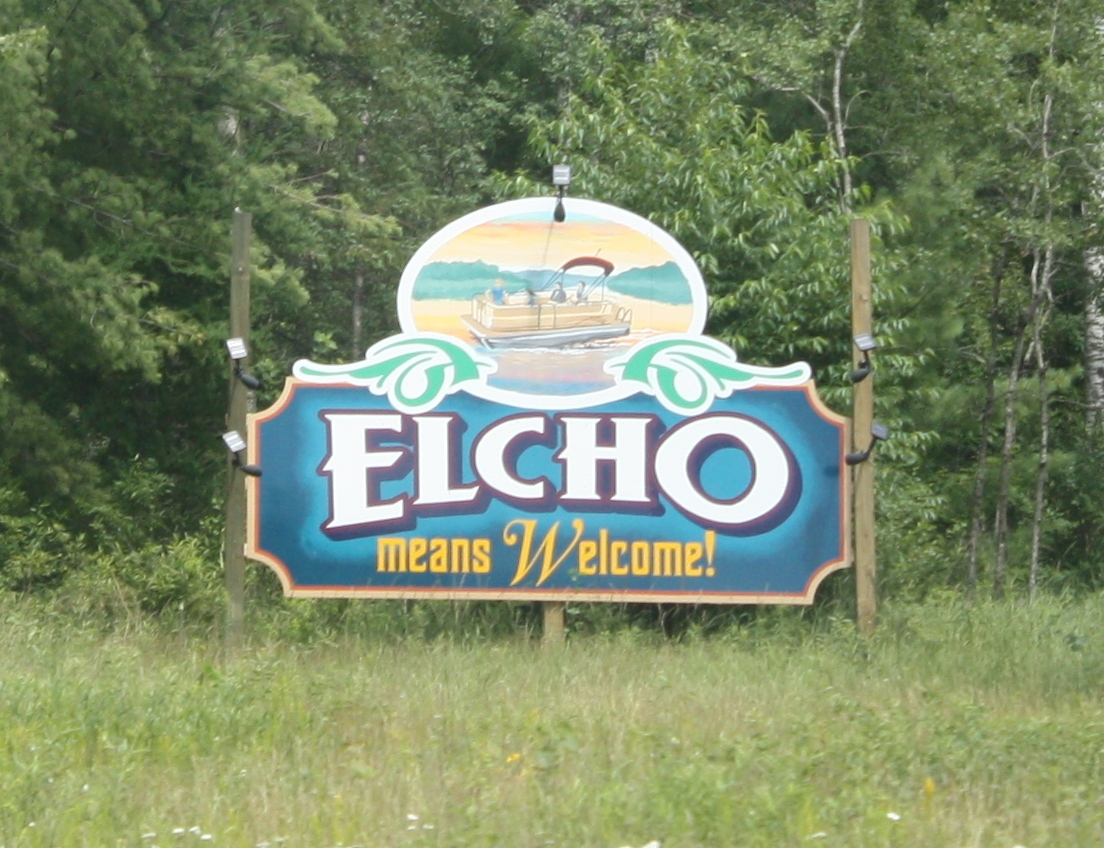
Welcome sign

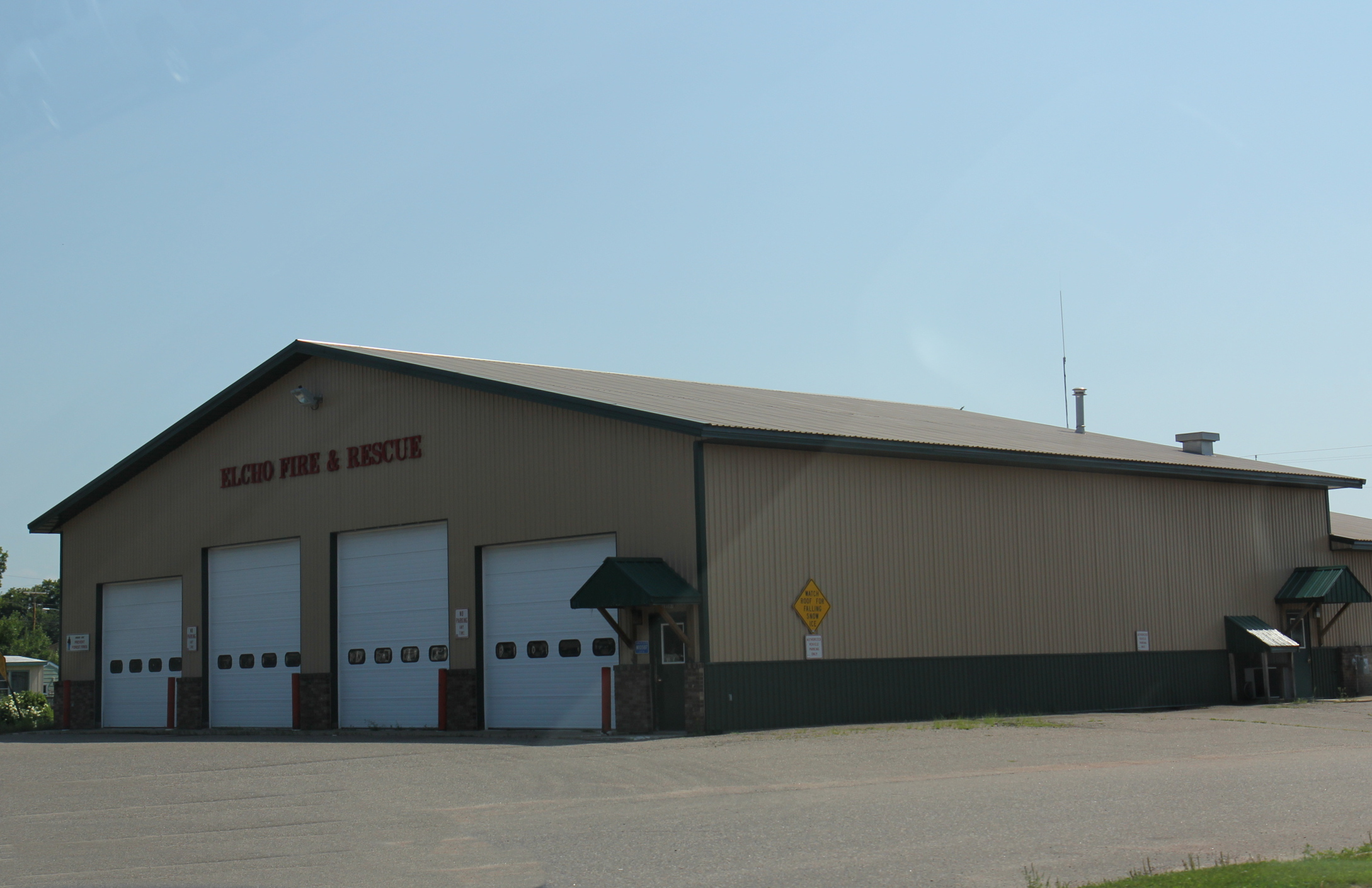
Fire and rescue building

== See also ==
- List of census-designated places in Wisconsin
