= Pearson, Wisconsin =

- Unincorporated community
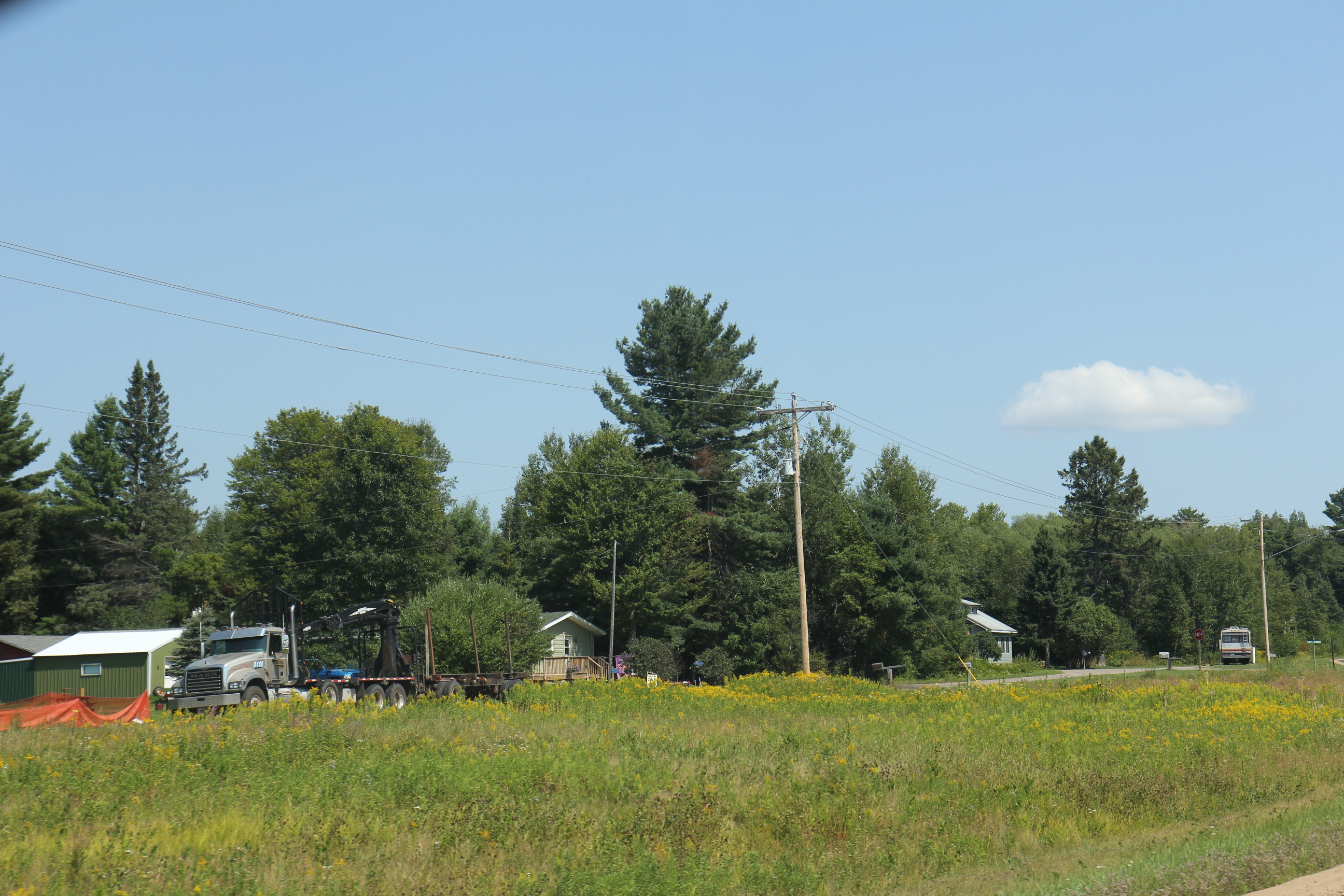
- Housing in Pearson

- Location within Wisconsin Location within the United States
- Coordinates: 45°21′51″N 89°00′59″W
- Country: United States
- State: Wisconsin
- County: Langlade
- Town: Ainsworth
- Elevation: 1,526 ft (465 m)
- Time zone: UTC-6 (Central (CST))
  - Summer (DST): UTC-5 (CDT)
- ZIP code: 54462
- Area codes: 715 & 534
- GNIS feature ID: 1571127

Pearson is an unincorporated community in the town of Ainsworth, Langlade County, Wisconsin, United States. Pearson is 5 miles (8 km) west of Pickerel and 17 miles (27 km) north-northeast of Antigo, the county seat of Langlade County. The community is situated on Pickerel Creek near its confluence with the Wolf River. County Highway T runs through Pearson; the closest state highway to the community is Wisconsin State Highway 55 in Pickerel.

Pearson had a post office, which closed on May 4, 1996; ZIP code 54462 still serves the community.

The Northeast Illinois Council of the Boy Scouts of America runs a summer camp, Ma-Ka-Ja-Wan Scout Reservation, in Pearson.

The Pickerel Volunteer Fire Department Station is located east of the community on Johnson Road.

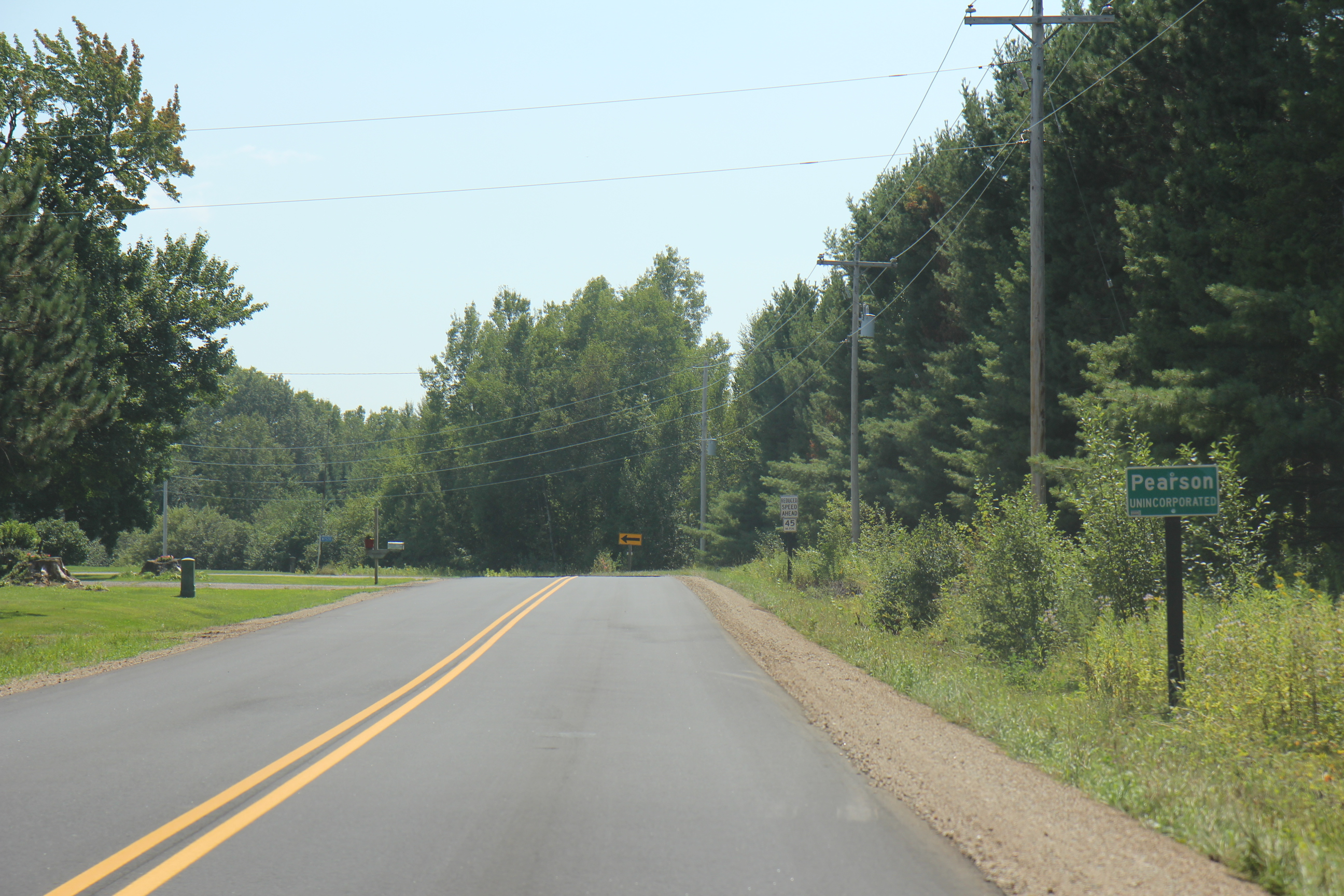
The sign for Pearson
