= Evergreen (disambiguation) =

Evergreen refers to plants that have leaves all year round.

Evergreen or Ever green may also refer to:

== Places ==
=== Australia ===
- Evergreen, Queensland

=== Canada ===
- Evergreen, Calgary
- Evergreen, Edmonton
- Evergreen, Saskatoon

=== United States ===
- Evergreen, Conecuh County, Alabama
- Evergreen, San Jose, California
  - Evergreen Village Square, San Jose
- Evergreen, Colorado
- Evergreen, Florida
- Evergreen Park, Illinois
- Evergreen, Louisiana
- Evergreen, Baltimore, Maryland
- Evergreen Township, Montcalm County, Michigan
- Evergreen Township, Sanilac County, Michigan
- Evergreen Township, Becker County, Minnesota
- Evergreen, Missouri
- Evergreen, Montana
- Evergreen, Tatums Township, Columbus County, North Carolina
- Evergreen, Ransom Township, Columbus County, North Carolina
- Evergreen, Ohio
- Evergreen, Allegheny County, Pennsylvania
- Evergreen, Bradford County, Pennsylvania
- Evergreen, Memphis, Tennessee
- Evergreen, Virginia
- Evergreen, West Virginia
- Evergreen, Langlade County, Wisconsin
  - Evergreen River, a river that starts in the town
- Evergreen, Marathon County, Wisconsin
- Evergreen, Washburn County, Wisconsin
- The Evergreens, a campground in Solon, Maine, U.S.

== Arts, entertainment and media ==
=== Music ===
==== Performers ====
- Evergreen (American band), an American post-punk band
- Evergreen (French band), a French indie pop duo
- Evergreen (rapper) (Nicholas Fantini, born 1984), Italian rapper

==== Albums ====
- Evergreen (Alison Brown album), 2008
- Evergreen (Booker T. album), 1974
- Evergreen (Broods album), 2014
- Evergreen (Echo & the Bunnymen album), or the title track, 1997
- Evergreen, Volume 2, by the Stone Poneys
- Evergreen (The Darling Buds EP), 2017
- Evergreen, by Audrey Assad, 2018
- Evergreen (After the Burial album), 2019
- Evergreen (Pentatonix album), 2021
- Evergreen (Pvris album), 2023
- Evergreens (album), by Mina, 1974
- Evergreen (Soccer Mommy album), 2024

==== Songs ====
- "Evergreen" (Booker T. Jones song), 1974
- "Evergreen" (Love Theme from A Star Is Born), by Barbra Streisand, 1976
- "Evergreen" (Hitomi Takahashi song), 2005
- "Evergreen" (Richy Mitch & the Coal Miners song), 2017
- "Evergreen" (Westlife song), 2001
- "Evergreen", by The Brian Jonestown Massacre from the 1995 album Methodrone
- "Evergreen", by Faithless from the 2001 album Outrospective
- "Evergreen", by the Fiery Furnaces from the 2005 album EP
- "Evergreen", by Gryffin from the 2022 album Alive
- "Evergreen", by Hyde, 2001
- "Evergreen", by Into a Circle, 1988
- "Evergreen", by Jars of Clay from the 2007 album Christmas Songs
- "Evergreen", by Roy Orbison from the 1962 album Roy Orbison's Greatest Hits
- "Evergreen", by Knuckle Puck from the 2015 album Copacetic
- "Evergreen", by Pvris from the 2023 Evergreen
- "Evergreen", by Scale the Summit from the 2013 album The Migration
- "Evergreen", by Susan Jacks, 1981
- "Evergreen", by Yebba, 2017
- "Ever Green", by Band-Maid from the 2014 album Maid in Japan
- "Evergreen (You Didn't Deserve Me at All)", by Omar Apollo, 2022

=== Television ===
- Evergreen (TV series), a 2018 South Korean TV series
- Evergreen (miniseries), 1985, based on the Belva Plain novel
- "Evergreen" (Adventure Time), a 2014 TV episode, and the fictional protagonist
- "Evergreen", an episode of The Twilight Zone (2002 TV series)

=== Other uses in arts, entertainment and media ===
- Ever Green, a 1930 musical
  - Evergreen (film), a 1934 British film based on the musical
- Evergreen (media), content that is not time-sensitive
- Evergreen (manga), a 2011 Japanese manga series
- Evergreen, a 1978 novel by Belva Plain, later made into a miniseries
- Evergreen Game, an 1852 chess game between Adolf Anderssen and Jean Dufresne
- Evergreen Review, a literary magazine

== Buildings ==
- Evergreen (Hopewell, Virginia), U.S.
- Evergreen (Mount Savage, Maryland), U.S.
- Evergreen (Owensville, Maryland), U.S.
- Evergreen (Rocky Mount, Virginia), U.S.
- Evergreen Museum & Library, Baltimore, Maryland, U.S.
- Evergreen on the Falls, Baltimore, Maryland, U.S.

== Businesses and organizations ==
- Evergreen Cooperatives, a group of cooperatives in Cleveland, Ohio, U.S.
- Evergreen Holding Group, a Chinese shipbuilding and potash mining company
- Evergreen International, an American nonprofit to overcome homosexual behavior
- Evergreen International Aviation, a global aviation services company
  - Evergreen International Airlines, a charter and cargo airline
- Evergreen Investments, an investment management business
- Evergreen Group, Taiwan-based conglomerate of shipping, transportation, and associated service companies
  - Evergreen Marine Corporation, a Taiwanese container transportation and shipping company
- Evergreen State College, in Olympia, Washington, U.S.
- Evergreen Technologies, a defunct American computer hardware company
- Evergreen College (Canada), a multi-campus private career college

== Science and technology ==
- Evergreen (GPU family)
- Evergreen (software), an open-source integrated library system
- Evergreening, extending the lifetime of patents
- Project Evergreen, by Chiltern Railways
- USCGC Evergreen, a buoy tender
- Evergreen, a shade of green

== See also ==
- Evergreen Cemetery (disambiguation)
- Washington (state), nicknamed The Evergreen State
