= Albany Township, Pennsylvania =

Albany Township is the name of some places in the U.S. state of Pennsylvania:

- Albany Township, Berks County, Pennsylvania
- Albany Township, Bradford County, Pennsylvania
