= Sintoukola potash project =

Sintoukola mine
- Location: Kouilou Department, Republic of the Congo
- Products: Potash

The Sintoukola potash project is a large potash project located in southern Republic of the Congo in Kouilou Department. Sintoukola represents one of the largest potash reserves in Republic of Congo having estimated reserves of 731 million tonnes of ore grading 20.5% potassium chloride metal. The project is being developed by Kore Potash.
