= I386 =

32-bit microprocessor by Intel

i386
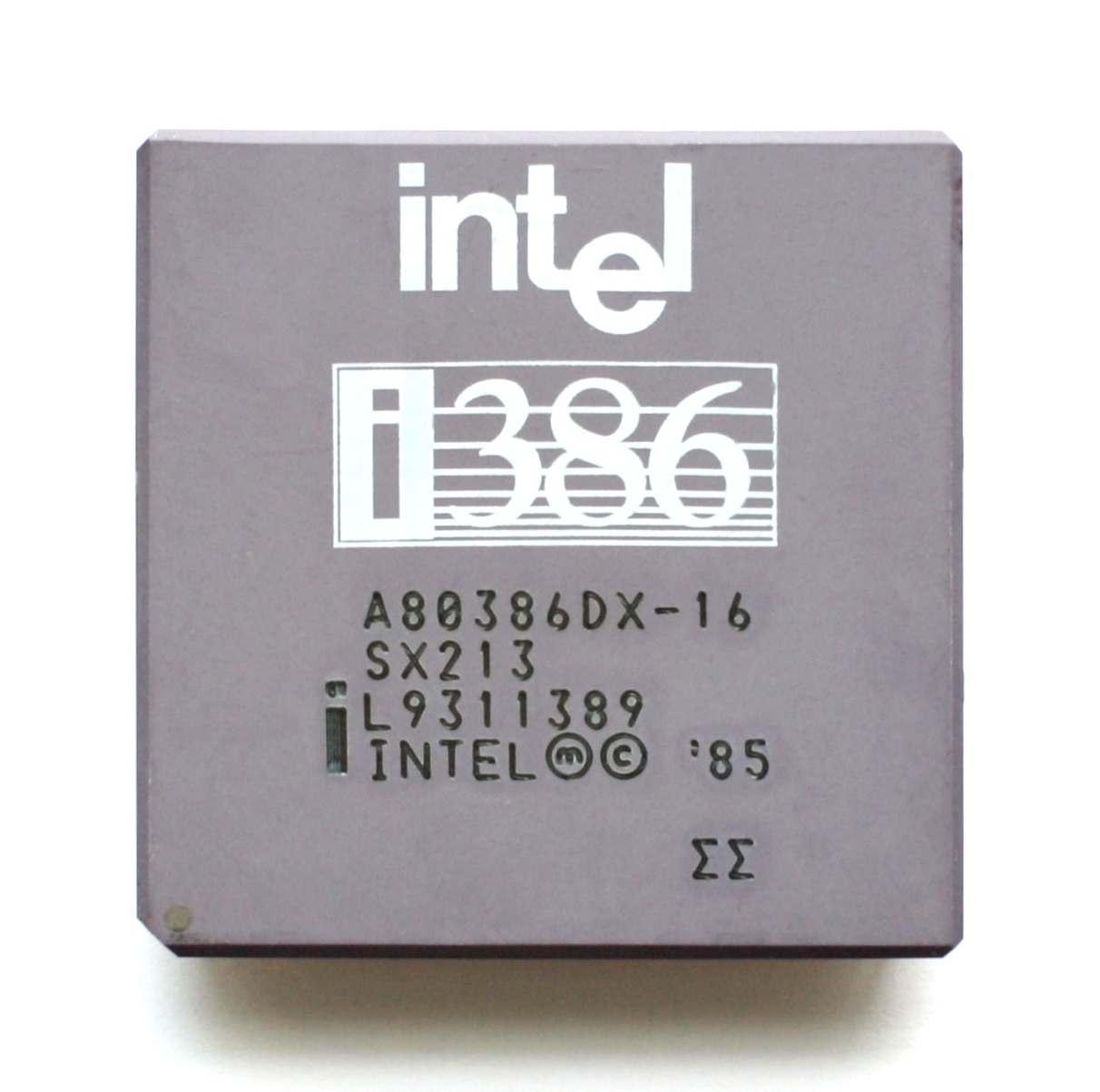
- An Intel i386DX 16 MHz processor in a ceramic package

General information
- Launched: October 1985
- Discontinued: September 28, 2007
- Common manufacturers: Intel; AMD; IBM

Performance
- Max. CPU clock rate: 12 MHz to 40 MHz
- Data width: 32 bits (386SX: 16 bits)
- Address width: 32 bits (386SX: 24 bits)

Physical specifications
- Transistors: 275,000 – 855,000
- Co-processor: 386DX: Intel 80387; 386SX: Intel 80387SX
- Package: 132-pin PGA, 132-pin PQFP; SX variant: 88-pin PGA, 100-pin BQFP with 0.635 mm pitch
- Socket: PGA132

Architecture and classification
- Technology node: 1.5 μm to 1 μm
- Instruction set: x86-16, IA-32
- Models: i386DX; i386SX; i386SL; i376; i386EX(T/TB/C); i386CXSA; i386SXSA/i386SXTA; i386CXSB; RapidCAD

History
- Predecessor: Intel 80286
- Successor: i486

Support status
- Unsupported

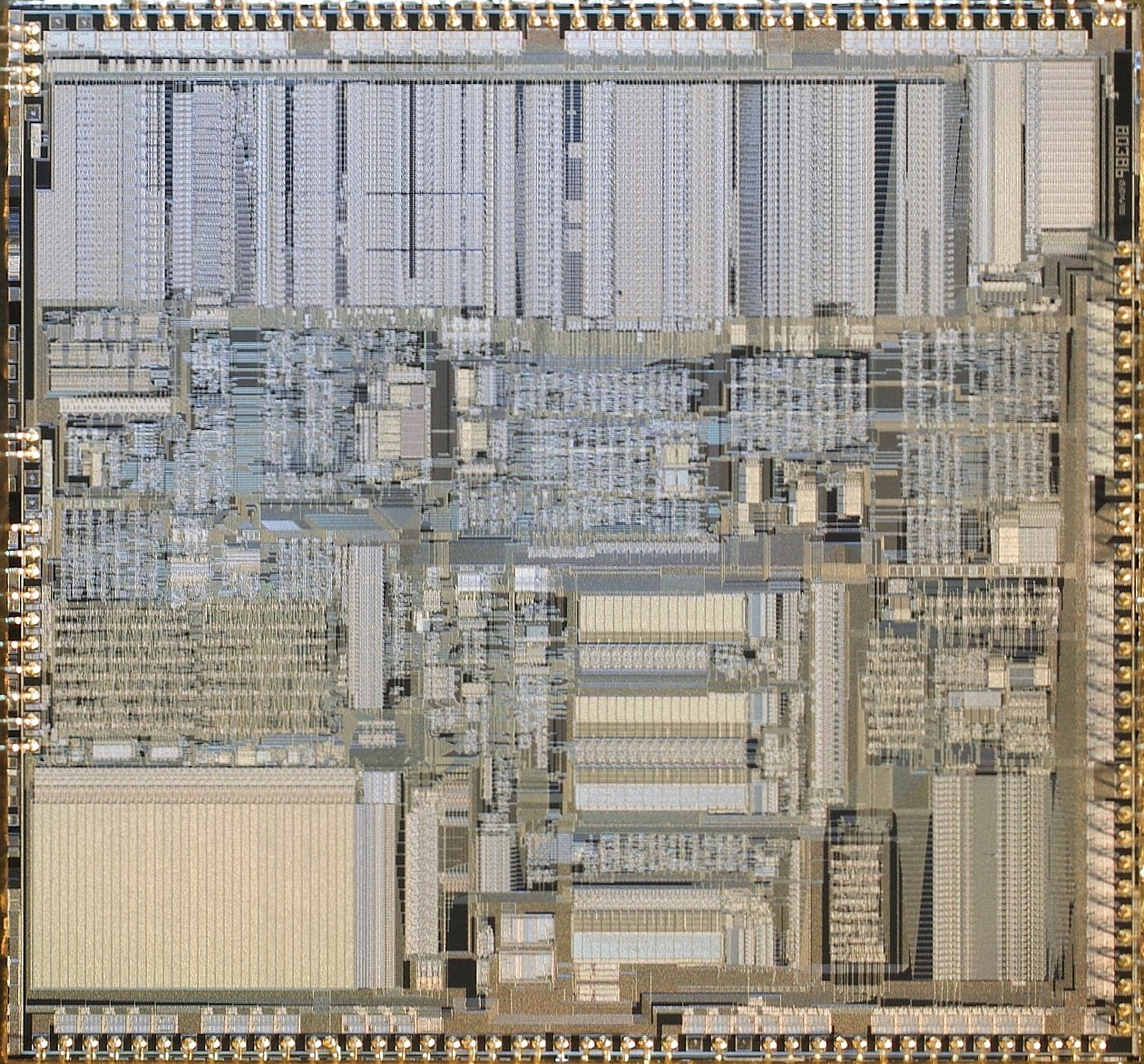
Intel A80386DX-20 CPU die image

The i386, originally released as the 80386, is a 32-bit microprocessor introduced by Intel in 1985 as the third generation of the x86 processor family. It extended the architecture with 32-bit registers and addressing while retaining backward compatibility with software written for earlier 16-bit x86 processors.

Pre-production samples of the 386 were released to select developers in October 1985, while mass production commenced in June 1986. It was the central processing unit (CPU) of many workstations and high-end personal computers of the time. It began to fall out of public use when i486 processors became increasingly popular in the early 1990s, while in embedded systems, the 386 remained in widespread use until Intel finally discontinued it in 2007.

Compared to its predecessor the Intel 80286 ("286"), the 32-bit i386 was compatible with the existing library of 16-bit applications created for earlier PCs, (Note: The 80286 was itself an extension of the 8086 architecture with advanced memory management functions and significantly better performance.) while also extending the architecture from 16-bits to 32-bits, extending the addressing to support up to 4 GB of memory, and adding an on-chip MMU allowing for easier virtual memory and paging implementation. The all-new virtual 8086 mode (or VM86) made it possible to run one or more real mode programs simultaneously virtualized under a protected mode operating environment.

The i386 instruction set, programming model, and binary encodings are still the common denominator for all 32-bit x86 processors, which is termed the i386 architecture, x86, or IA-32, depending on context. Over the years, successively newer implementations of the same architecture have become several hundreds of times faster than the original 80386 (and thousands of times faster than the 8086). (Note: This considers integer performance only, as processors prior to the 486DX require a coprocessor to perform floating point calculations in hardware. Increases in floating point performance are measured in tens of thousands of times, compared to the 8086's floating point coprocessor the 8087, or hundreds of thousands of times compared to software implementations of floating point on the 8086.)

== Production history ==
=== Development ===
In the early 1980s Intel, the creator of 80286, was aware of that microprocessor's poor reputation. The company's own engineers believed that Motorola 68000 was superior to their "ugly duckling". Bill Gates called 80286 "brain dead", and important customer IBM thought that its architecture was a flawed dead end. While the company expected that Intel i432 would be its future architecture, i432 was very slow and many also believed unsuitable. Groups worked on various successors, including a completely new architecture ("P4") from i432 designer Glen Myers that resembled DEC VAX, and another ("P7") intended to combine Myers's work and i432 technology.

Although many in the company believed that a 32-bit successor to 80286 was nonviable, Gene Hill and 80286 co-designer Robert Childs secretly worked on the "stepchild" project and persuaded others of its potential over Myers's plan, which people such as John Crawford compared to the events at Data General in The Soul of a New Machine. Binary compatibility with the Intel 8086 architecture the recently introduced IBM PC used was at first not seen as important, and many disliked the older CPUs' segmented memory model. A greater priority was a 32-bit flat memory model so 80386 can, like 68000, run Unix well.

80386 development began in 1982 under the internal name of P3. Intel previously used NMOS logic but 80386 was its first CMOS product, consistent with the industry trend. The rapidly growing IBM PC installed base made supporting its software library more important, and Intel salespeople told customers that their 286 software would run on 386. The 386 designers thus supported both flat and segmented memory models, what Crawford described as "the best of both worlds". Pat Gelsinger led the port of Amdahl UTS to the CPU to confirm Unix's viability. A 512-byte CPU cache was meant to be incorporated (twice as large as the 68020's, for marketing purposes) but the limit of die size made this impossible, and it was replaced with a small prefetch queue and the ability to use an external cache controller.

The tape-out of the 80386 development was finalized in July 1985. The 80386 was introduced as pre-production samples for software development workstations in October 1985. Intel had exited the DRAM market to focus on microprocessors, so the former "stepchild" was vital to its future; the company moved memory engineers to the 80386 project, improving the die shrink. The forthcoming product persuaded customers that the 80286 was not a dead end, increasing the latter's sales.

=== First production ===
80386 manufacturing in volume began in June 1986, along with the first plug-in device that allowed existing 80286-based computers to be upgraded to the 386, the Translator 386 by American Computer and Peripheral. The 80386 being sole sourced made the CPU very expensive, but it was very successful. Hill recalled representing the design team at a PC Magazine awards ceremony:

But what really sunk in my brain was to look around the room, because all the awards that year were for the 386 boxes, software, boards, chips, peripheral chips. It was all 386. So here was a whole ballroom full of people, the elite in their various industries that were getting awards just because of the 386. So it really struck me how many jobs and how much businesses had been created from the 386. It became not only the king of Intel, but the king of many industries, not just the PC industry.

Although the multiple segment models were rarely used their existence may have benefited Intel, because the complexity slowed other companies' ability to second source the CPU. Mainboards for 80386-based computer systems were cumbersome and expensive at first, but manufacturing was justified upon the 80386's mainstream adoption. The first personal computer to make use of the 80386 was the Deskpro 386, designed and manufactured by Compaq; this marked the first time a fundamental component in the IBM PC compatible de facto standard was updated by a company other than IBM.

The first versions of the 386 have 275,000 transistors. The 20 MHz version operates at 4–5 MIPS. It also performs between 8,000 and 9,000 Dhrystones per second. The 25 MHz 386 version is capable of 7 MIPS. A 33 MHz 80386 was reportedly measured to operate at about 11.4 and 11.5 MIPS. At that same speed, it has the performance of 8 VAX MIPS. These processors run about 4.4 clocks per instruction.

=== Successor ===
After AMD and Chips and Technologies released 386-compatible CPUs, Intel in 1992 lowered the price of its 25-MHz 80486SX processor to less than that of the 33-MHz 80386. An industry analyst said that Intel wanted customers to move to the competition-free 486. The strategy was very successful; by 1993 many computer companies had discontinued 80386 products or planned to do so later that year. Customers who found that Windows 3.1 ran slowly with 386 were willing to pay $200–300 more for 486; Dell reported that 80486-based computers were 70% of sales.

=== Discontinuation ===
In May 2006, Intel announced that i386 production would stop at the end of September 2007. Although it had long been obsolete as a personal computer CPU, Intel and others had continued making the chip for embedded systems. Such systems using an i386 or one of many derivatives are common in aerospace technology and electronic musical instruments, among others. Some mobile phones also used (later fully static CMOS variants of) the i386 processor, such as the BlackBerry 950 and Nokia 9000 Communicator. Linux continued to support i386 processors until December 11, 2012, when the kernel cut 386-specific instructions in version 3.8.

== Architecture ==
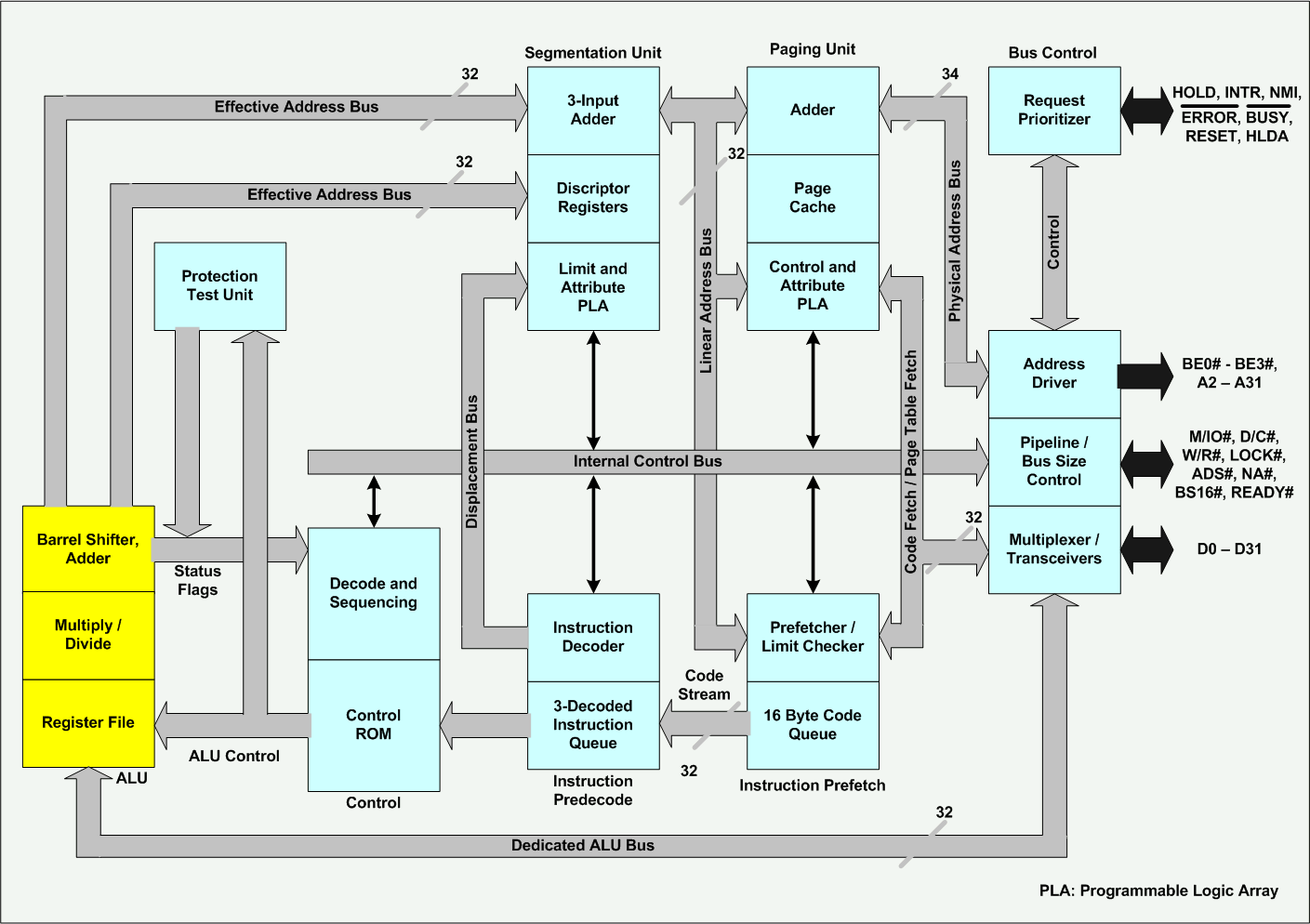
Block diagram of the i386 microarchitecture

i386 registers
^{3}_{1}	...	^{1}_{5}	...	^{0}_{7}	...	^{0}_{0}	(bit position)
Main registers (8/16/32 bits)
EAX		AX		AL			Accumulator
ECX		CX		CL			Count register
EDX		DX		DL			Data register
EBX		BX		BL			Base register
Index registers (16/32 bits)
ESP		SP					Stack Pointer
EBP		BP					Base Pointer
ESI		SI					Source Index
EDI		DI					Destination Index
Program counter (16/32 bits)
EIP		IP					Instruction Pointer
Segment selectors (16 bits)
		CS					Code Segment
		DS					Data Segment
		ES					Extra Segment
		FS					F Segment
		GS					G Segment
		SS					Stack Segment
Status register
^{1}_{7}	^{1}_{6}	^{1}_{5}	^{1}_{4}	^{1}_{3}	^{1}_{2}	^{1}_{1}	^{1}_{0}	^{0}_{9}	^{0}_{8}	^{0}_{7}	^{0}_{6}	^{0}_{5}	^{0}_{4}	^{0}_{3}	^{0}_{2}	^{0}_{1}	^{0}_{0}	(bit position)
V	R	0	N	IOPL		O	D	I	T	S	Z	0	A	0	P	1	C	EFlags

The processor was a significant evolution in the x86 architecture, and extended a long line of processors that stretched back to the Intel 8008. The predecessor of the 80386 was the Intel 80286, a 16-bit processor with a segment-based memory management and protection system. The 80386 extended the architecture from 16-bits to 32-bits, and added an on-chip memory management unit. This paging translation unit made it much easier to implement operating systems that used virtual memory. It also offered support for register debugging. It featured eight independent pipelined functional units which operated in parallel, though complex x86 instruction decoding restricted the maximum throughput to one instruction every two clock cycles (0.5 IPC).

The 80386 featured three operating modes: real mode, virtual mode, and protected mode. The protected mode, which debuted in the 286, was extended to allow the 386 to address up to 4 GB of memory. With the addition of segmented addressing system, it can expand up to 64 TB of virtual memory. The all new virtual 8086 mode (or VM86) made it possible to run one or more real mode programs in a protected environment, although some programs were not compatible. It features scaled indexing and 64-bit barrel shifter.

The ability for a 386 to be set up to act like it had a flat memory model in protected mode despite the fact that it uses a segmented memory model in all modes was arguably the most important feature change for the x86 processor family until AMD released the x86-64 in 2003.

Several new instructions have been added to 386: BSF, BSR, BT, BTS, BTR, BTC, CDQ, CWDE, LFS, LGS, LSS, MOVSX, MOVZX, SETcc, SHLD, SHRD.

Two new segment registers have been added (FS and GS) for general-purpose programs. The single Machine Status Word of the 286 grew into eight control registers CR0–CR7. Debug registers DR0–DR7 were added for hardware breakpoints. New forms of the MOV instruction are used to access them.

The chief architect in the development of the 80386 was John H. Crawford. He was responsible for extending the 80286 architecture and instruction set to 32-bits, and then led the microprogram development for the 80386 chip.

The i486 and P5 Pentium line of processors were descendants of the i386 design.

=== Data types ===
The following data types are directly supported and thus implemented by one or more i386 machine instructions; these data types are briefly described here.:

- Bit (Boolean value), bit field (group of up to 32 bits) and bit string (up to 4 Gbit in length).
- 8-bit integer (byte), either signed (range −128..127) or unsigned (range 0..255).
- 16-bit integer, either signed (range −32,768..32,767) or unsigned (range 0..65,535).
- 32-bit integer, either signed (range −2^{31}..2^{31}−1) or unsigned (range 0..2^{32}−1).
- Offset, a 16- or 32-bit displacement referring to a memory location (using any addressing mode).
- Pointer, a 16-bit selector together with a 16- or 32-bit offset.
- Character (8-bit character code).
- String, a sequence of 8-, 16- or 32-bit words (up to 4 Gbyte in length).
- BCD, decimal digits (0..9) represented by unpacked bytes.
- Packed BCD, two BCD digits in one byte (range 0..99).

== Example code ==
The following i386 assembly source code is for a subroutine named _strtolower that copies a null-terminated ASCIIZ character string from one location to another, converting all alphabetic characters to lower case. The string is copied one byte (8-bit character) at a time.

                         
                         
                         
                         
                         
                         
                         
                         
                         
00000000
00000000  55
00000001  89E5
00000003  8B750C
00000006  8B7D08
00000009  FC
0000000A  AC
0000000B  3C41
0000000D  7C06
0000000F  3C5A
00000011  7F02
00000013  0420
00000015  AA
00000016  84C0
00000018  75F0
0000001A  5D
0000001B  C3
0000001C

; _strtolower:
; Copy a null-terminated ASCII string, converting
; all alphabetic characters to lower case.
;
; Entry stack parameters
;      [ESP+8] = src, Address of source string
;      [ESP+4] = dst, Address of target string
;      [ESP+0] = Return address
;
_strtolower proc
       push   ebp			    ; Set up the call frame
       mov	  ebp,esp
       mov	  esi,[ebp+0xc]	    ; Set ESI = src (+4 for push ebp)
       mov	  edi,[ebp+0x8]	    ; Set EDI = dst
       cld				        ; Auto-increment ESI and EDI
again: lodsb			        ; Load AL from [ESI], bump ESI
       cmp    al,'A'			; If AL < 'A',
       jl     copy			    ; Skip conversion
       cmp    al,'Z'			; If AL > 'Z',
       jg	  copy		        ; Skip conversion
       add	  al,'a'-'A'      	; Convert AL to lowercase
copy:  stosb			        ; Store AL to [EDI], bump EDI
       test   al,al		  	    ; If AL != 0,
       jnz	  again			    ; Repeat the loop
       pop	  ebp		 	    ; Restore the previous base
       ret				        ; Return to caller
end    proc

The example code uses the EBP (base pointer) register to establish a call frame, an area on the stack that contains all of the parameters and local variables for the execution of the subroutine. This kind of calling convention supports reentrant and recursive code and has been used by Algol-like languages since the late 1950s. A flat memory model is assumed, specifically, that the DS and ES segments address the same region of memory.

== Business importance ==
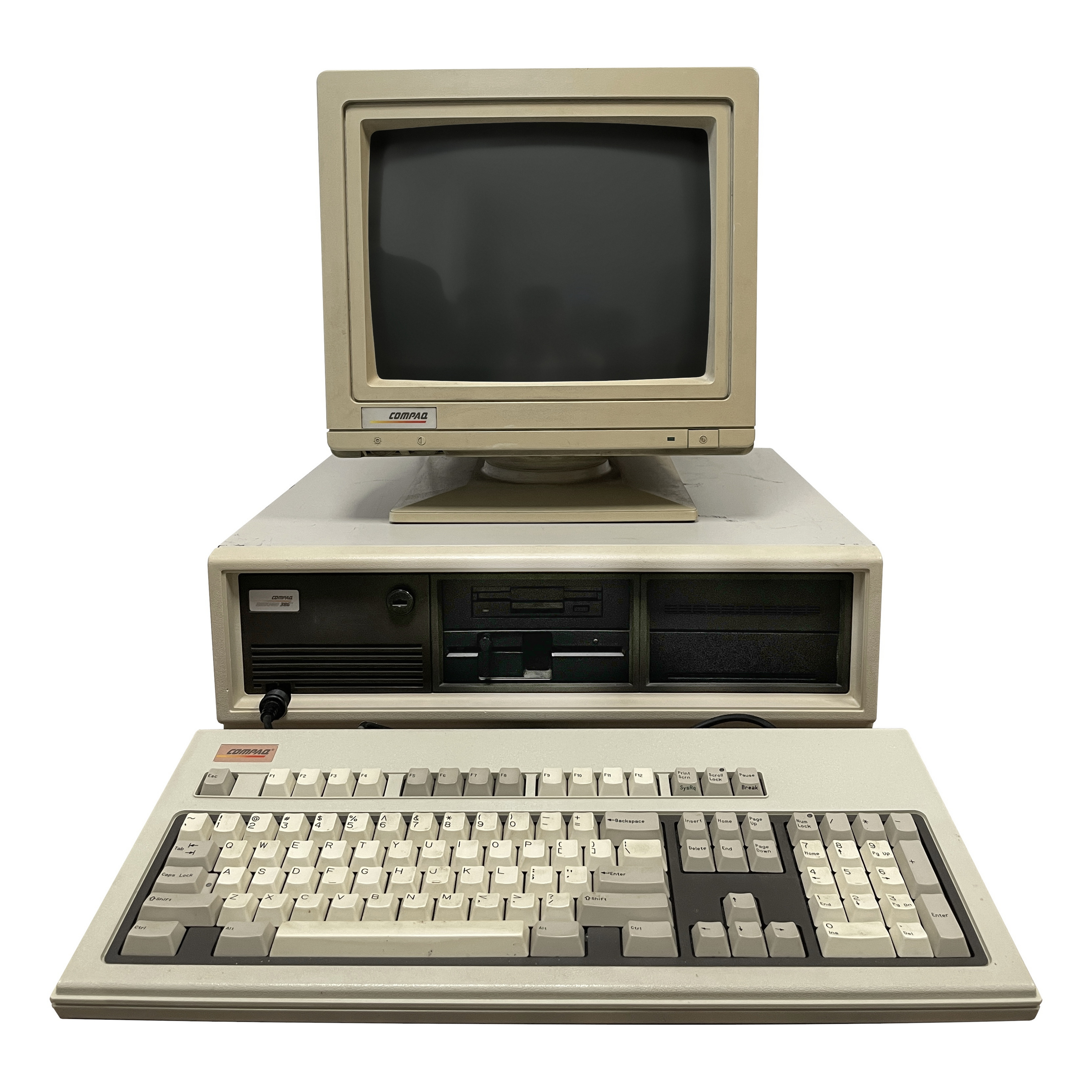
A Compaq Deskpro 386 with monitor and peripherals; the Deskpro 386 was the first personal computer to feature an 80386 microprocessor.

The first PC based on the Intel 80386 was the Compaq Deskpro 386, introduced in September 1986. By extending the 16/24-bit IBM PC/AT standard into a natively 32-bit computing environment, Compaq became the first company to design and manufacture such a major technical hardware advance on the PC platform. IBM was offered use of the 80386, but had manufacturing rights for the earlier 80286. IBM therefore chose to rely on that processor for a couple more years. The early success of the Compaq Deskpro 386 played an important role in legitimizing the PC "clone" industry and in de-emphasizing IBM's role within it. The first computer system sold with the 386SX was the Compaq Deskpro 386S, released in July 1988.

Prior to the 386, the difficulty of manufacturing microchips and the uncertainty of reliable supply made it desirable that any mass-market semiconductor be multi-sourced, that is, made by two or more manufacturers, the second and subsequent companies manufacturing under license from the originating company. The 386 was for a time (4.7 years) only available from Intel, since Andy Grove, Intel's CEO at the time, made the decision not to encourage other manufacturers to produce the processor as second sources. This decision was ultimately crucial to Intel's success in the market. The 386 was the first significant microprocessor to be single-sourced. Single-sourcing the 386 allowed Intel greater control over its development and substantially greater profits in later years.

AMD introduced its compatible Am386 processor in March 1991 after overcoming legal obstacles, thus ending Intel's 4.7-year monopoly on 386-compatible processors. From 1991 IBM also manufactured 386 chips under license for use only in IBM PCs and boards.

In 1991, while studying computer science at University of Helsinki, Linus Torvalds began a project that later became the Linux kernel. He wrote the program specifically for the hardware he was using and independent of an operating system because he wanted to use the functions of his new 80386 PC.

== Compatibles ==
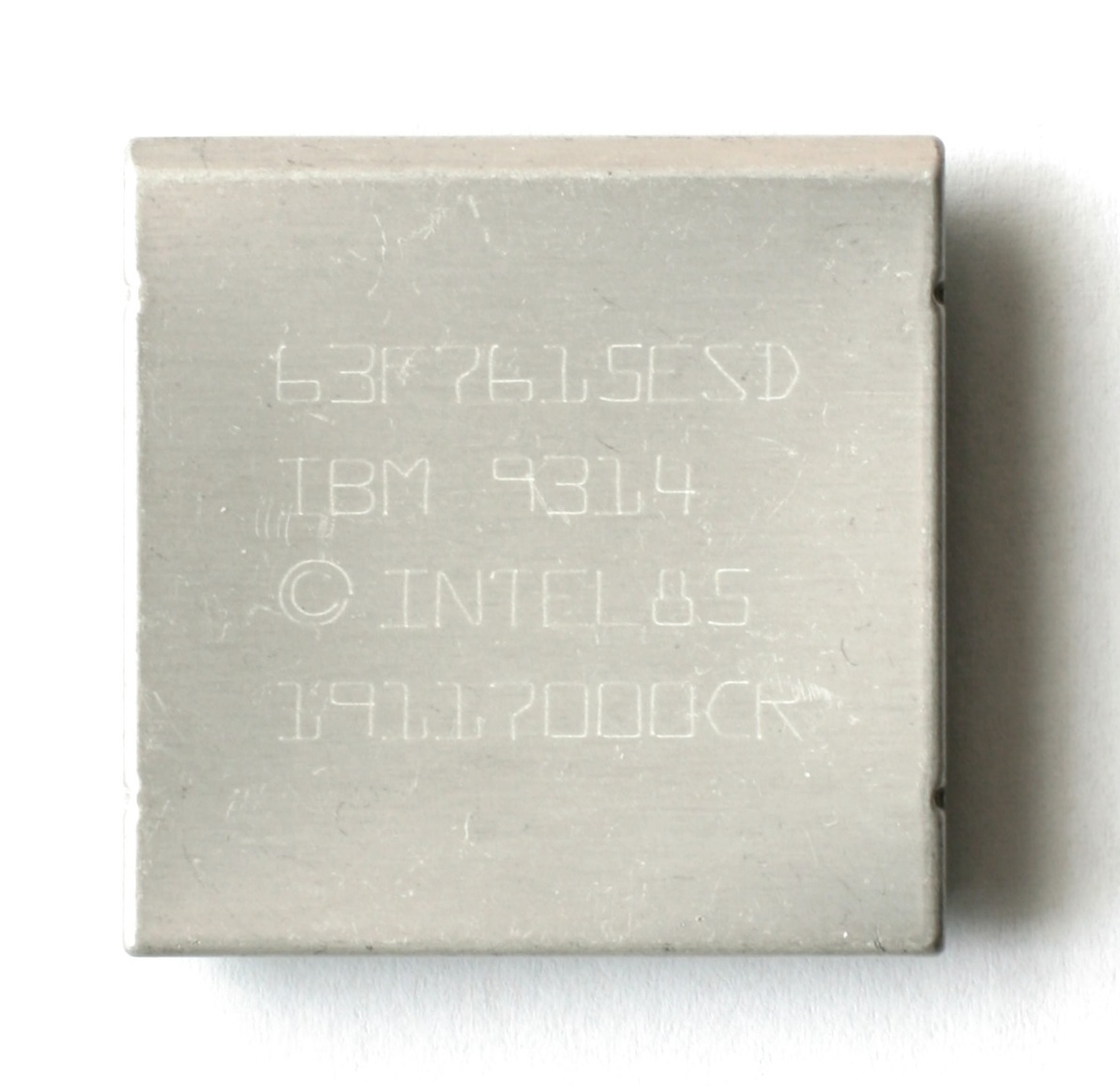
Intel i386 packaged by IBM

- The AMD Am386SX and Am386DX were almost exact clones of the i386SX and i386DX. Legal disputes caused production delays for several years, but AMD's 40 MHz part eventually became very popular with computer enthusiasts as a low-cost and low-power alternative to the 25 MHz 486SX. The power draw was further reduced in the "notebook models" (Am386 DXL/SXL/DXLV/SXLV), which could operate with 3.3 V and were implemented in fully static CMOS circuitry.
- Chips and Technologies Super386 38600SX and 38600DX were developed using reverse engineering. They sold poorly, due to some technical errors and incompatibilities, as well as their late appearance on the market. They were therefore short-lived products.
- Cyrix Cx486SLC/Cx486DLC could be (simplistically) described as a kind of 386/486 hybrid chip that included a small amount of on-chip cache. It was popular among computer enthusiasts but did poorly with OEMs. The Cyrix Cx486SLC and Cyrix Cx486DLC processors were pin-compatible with i386SX and i386DX respectively. These processors were also manufactured and sold by Texas Instruments.
- IBM 386SLC and 486SLC/DLC were variants of Intel's design which contained a large amount of on-chip cache (8 KB, and later 16 KB). The agreement with Intel limited their use to IBM's own line of computers and upgrade boards only, so they were not available on the open market.
- V.M. Technology VM386SX+ was developed by Tsukuba, Japan-based fabless microprocessor design firm V.M. Technology (VMT), founded by former Intel 4004 and Zilog Z80 microprocessor design engineer Masatoshi Shima, with its primary funding originating from ASCII Corporation. The chip was primarily marketed in East Asia, avoiding the US market deliberately. ALi M6117 SoC contains an x86 core derived from VM386SX+.

== Early problems ==
Intel originally intended for the 80386 to debut at 16 MHz. However, due to poor yields, it was instead introduced at 12.5 MHz.

Early in production, Intel discovered a marginal circuit that could cause a system to return incorrect results from 32-bit multiply operations. Not all of the processors already manufactured were affected, so Intel tested its inventory. Processors that were found to be bug-free were marked with a double sigma (ΣΣ), and affected processors were marked "16 BIT S/W ONLY". These latter processors were sold as good parts, since at the time 32-bit capability was not relevant for most users.

The i387 math coprocessor was not ready in time for the introduction of the 80386, and so many of the early 80386 motherboards instead provided a socket and hardware logic to make use of an 80287. In this configuration the FPU operated asynchronously to the CPU, usually with a clock rate of 10 MHz. The original Compaq Deskpro 386 is an example of such design.

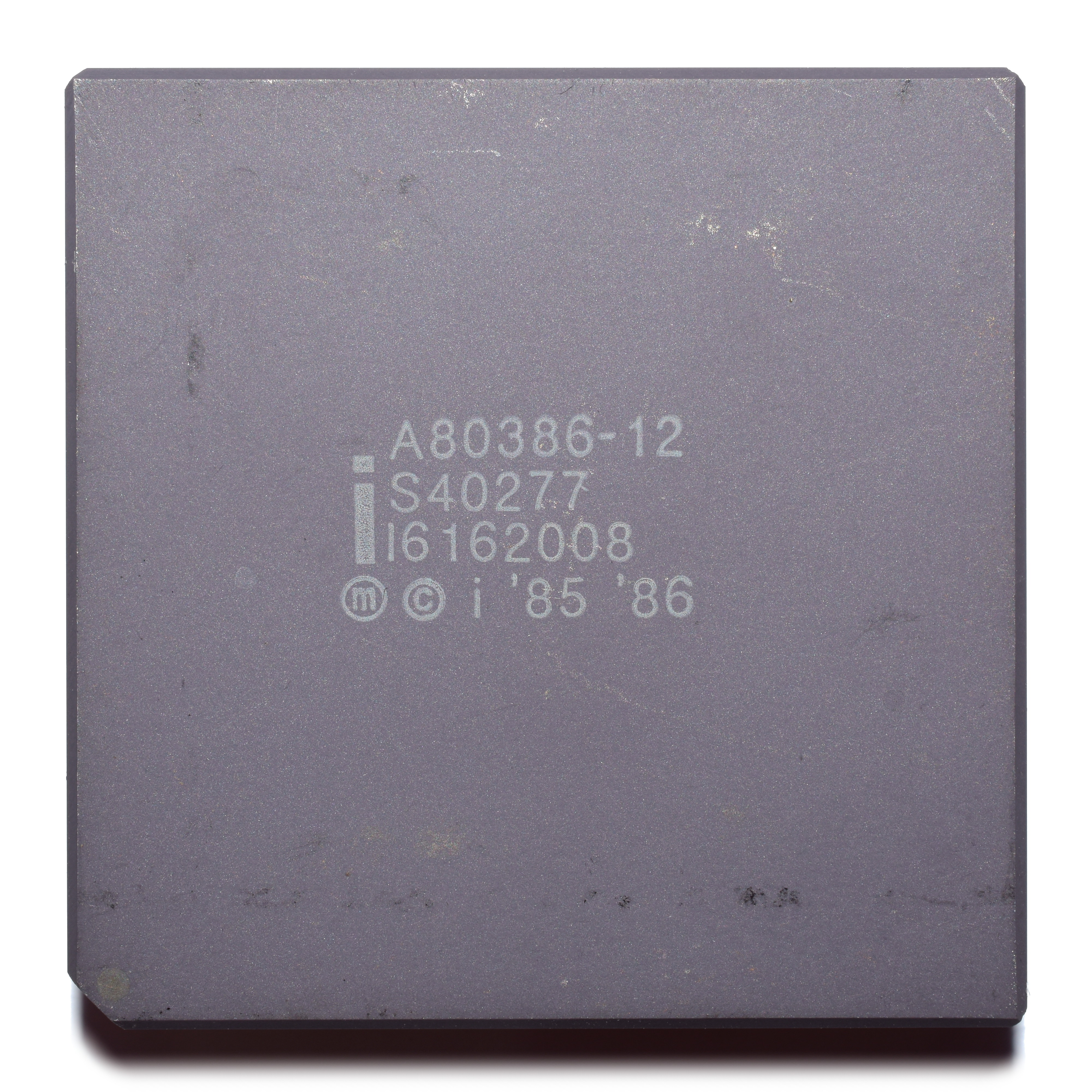
A very early 80386 at 12 MHz (A80386-12), before the 32-bit multiply bug was found

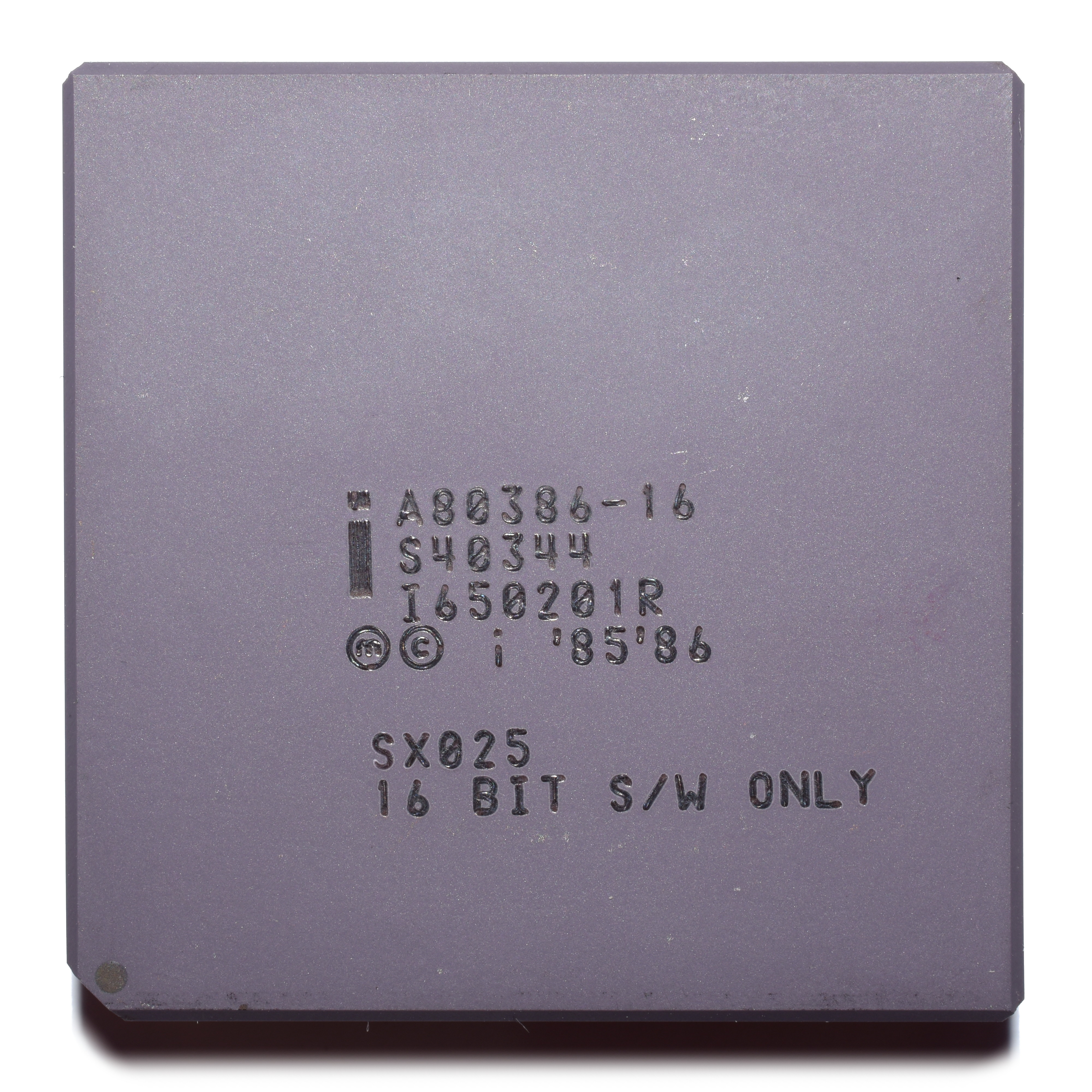
An A80386-16 marked "16 BIT S/W ONLY" with the multiply bug

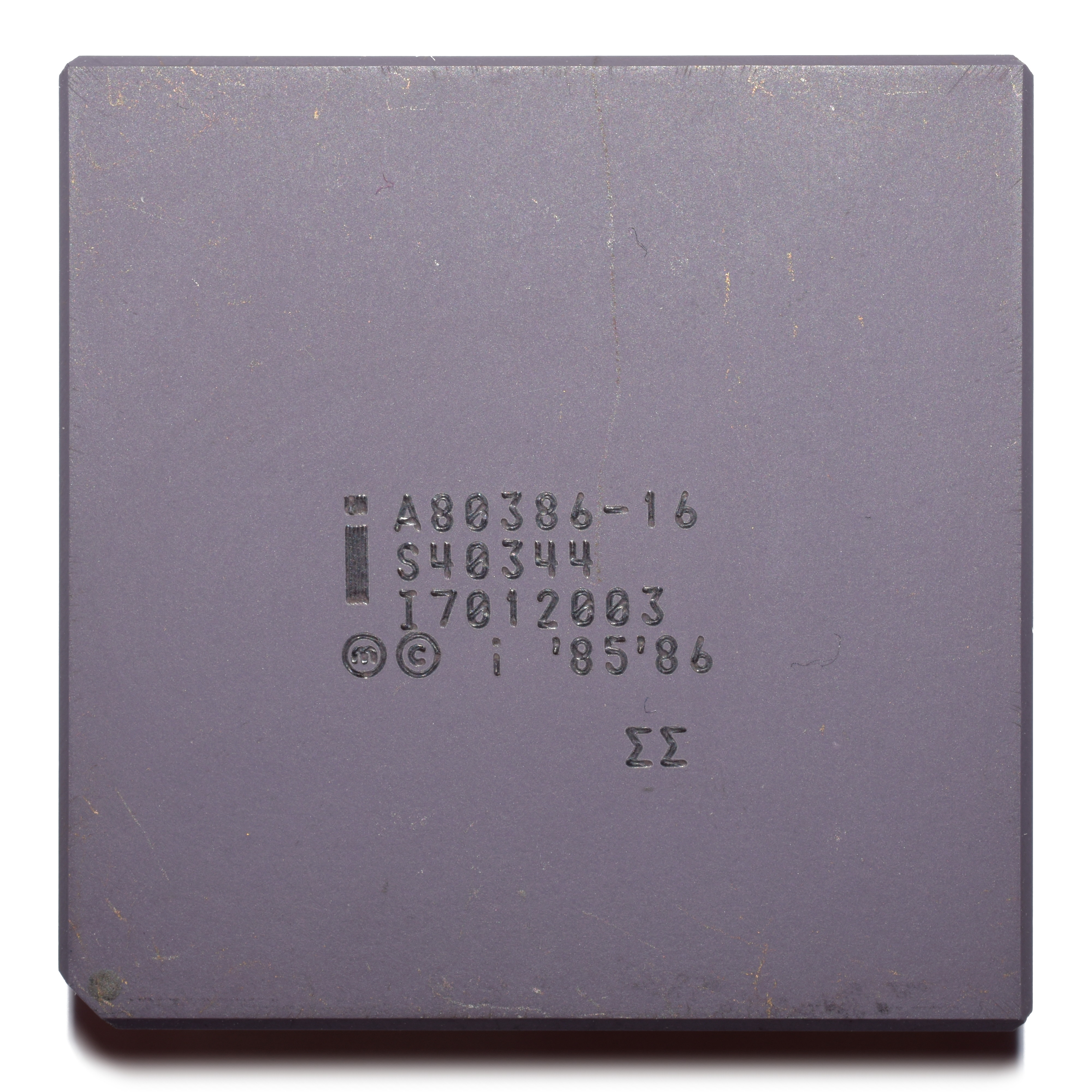
A bug-free A80386-16 marked "ΣΣ"

== Pin-compatible upgrades ==
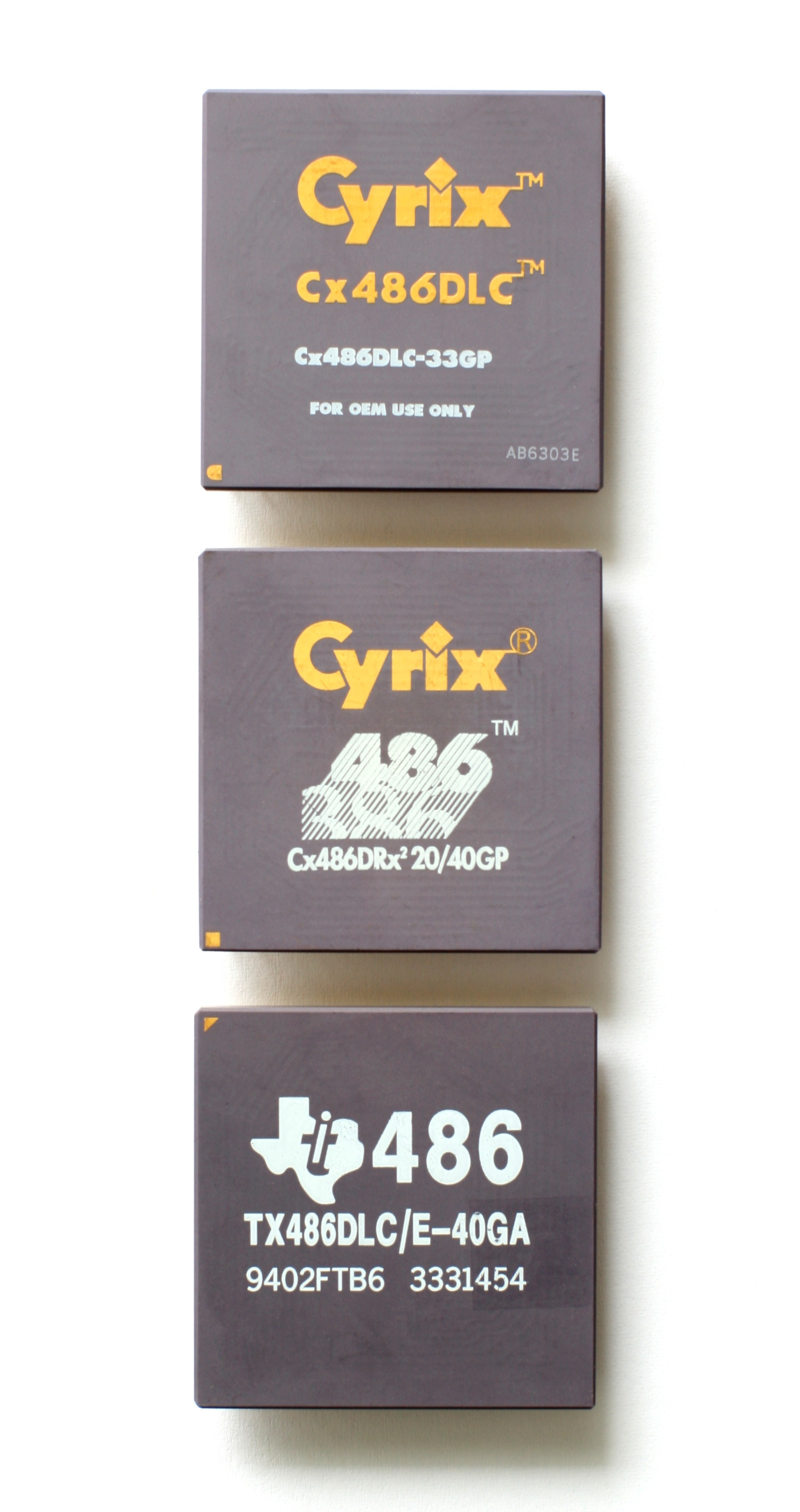
Typical 386 upgrade CPUs from Cyrix and Texas Instruments

Intel later offered a modified version of its 486DX in i386 packaging, branded as the Intel RapidCAD. This provided an upgrade path for users with i386-compatible hardware. The upgrade was a pair of chips that replaced both the i386 and i387. Since the 486DX design contained an FPU, the chip that replaced the i386 contained the floating-point functionality, and the chip that replaced the i387 served very little purpose. However, the latter chip was necessary in order to provide the FERR signal to the mainboard and appear to function as a normal floating-point unit.

Third parties offered a wide range of upgrades, for both SX and DX systems. The most popular ones were based on the Cyrix 486DLC/SLC core, which typically offered a substantial speed improvement due to its more efficient instruction pipeline and internal L1 SRAM cache. The cache was usually 1 KB, or sometimes 8 KB in the TI variant. Some of these upgrade chips (such as the 486DRx2/SRx2) were marketed by Cyrix themselves, but they were more commonly found in kits offered by upgrade specialists such as Kingston, Evergreen Technologies and Improve-It Technologies. Some of the fastest CPU upgrade modules featured the IBM SLC/DLC family (notable for its 16 KB L1 cache), or even the Intel 486 itself. Many 386 upgrade kits were advertised as being simple drop-in replacements, but often required complicated software to control the cache or clock doubling. Part of the problem was that on most 386 motherboards, the A20 line was controlled entirely by the motherboard with the CPU being unaware, which caused problems on CPUs with internal caches.

Overall, it was very difficult to configure upgrades to produce the results advertised on the packaging, and upgrades were often not very stable or not fully compatible.

== Models and variants ==
=== Early 5 V models ===
==== i386DX ====
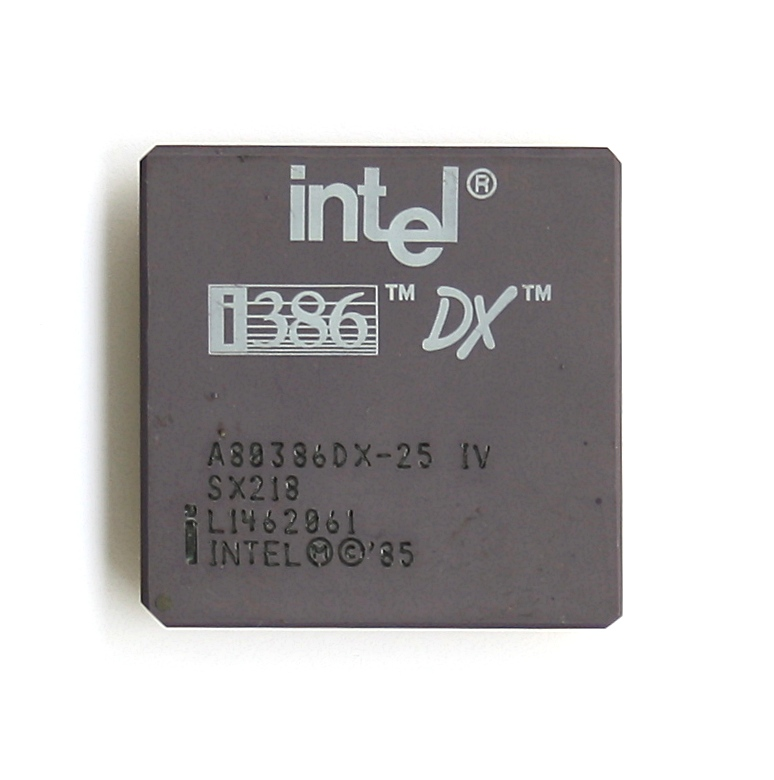
Intel i386DX, 25 MHz

Original version, released in October 1985. The 16 MHz version was available for US$299 in quantities of 100. The 20 MHz version was available for $599 in quantities of 100. The 33 MHz version was made available on April 10, 1989.

- Capable of working with 16- or 32-bit external busses
- Package: PGA-132 which was available in sampling for fourth quarter of 1985 or PQFP-132
- Process: First types CHMOS III, 1.5 μm, later CHMOS IV, 1 μm
- Die size: 104 mm² (ca. 10 mm × 10 mm) in CHMOS III and 39 mm² (6 mm × 6.5 mm) in CHMOS IV.
- Transistor count: 275,000
- Specified max clock: 12 MHz (early models), later 16, 20, 25 and 33 MHz

==== M80386 ====
The military version was made using the CHMOS III process technology. It was made to withstand 105 Rads (Si) or greater. It was available for $945 each in quantities of 100.

==== 80386SX ====
In 1988, Intel introduced the 80386SX, most often referred to as the 386SX, a cut-down version of the 80386 with a 16-bit data bus, mainly intended for lower-cost PCs aimed at the home, educational, and small-business markets, while the 386DX remained the high-end variant used in workstations, servers, and other demanding tasks. The CPU remained fully 32-bit internally, but the 16-bit bus was intended to simplify circuit-board layout and reduce total cost. (Note: This was a similar approach to that used by Intel with the 8088, a derivative of the Intel 8086, that was used in the original IBM PC.) The 16-bit bus simplified designs but hampered performance. Only 24 pins were connected to the address bus, therefore limiting addressing to 16 MB, (Note: The 16 MB limit was similar to that of the 68000, a comparable processor.) but this was not a critical constraint at the time. Performance differences were due not only to differing data-bus widths, but also due to performance-enhancing cache memories often employed on boards using the original chip. This version can run 32-bit application software at 70 to 90 percent the speed of the regular Intel386 DX CPU.

The original 80386 was subsequently renamed i386DX to avoid confusion. However, Intel subsequently used the "DX" suffix to refer to the floating-point capability of the i486DX. The 387SX was an 80387 part that was compatible with the 386SX (i.e. with a 16-bit databus). The 386SX was packaged in a surface-mount QFP and sometimes offered in a socket to allow for an upgrade.

The 16 MHz 386SX contains the 100-lead BQFP. It was available for $165 in quantities of 1000. It has the performance of 2.5 to 3 MIPS as well. The low-power version was available on April 10, 1989. This version that uses 20 to 30 percent less power and has higher operating temperature than the regular version, up to 100 °C. They were available for US$26 in 5,000-piece quantities.

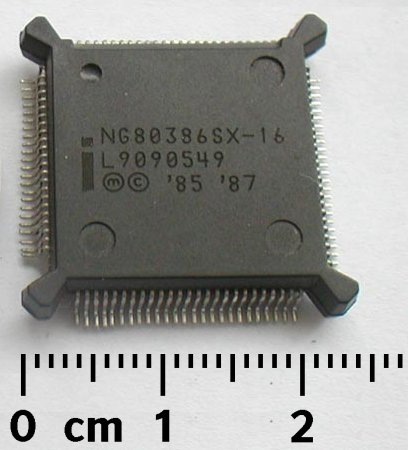
80386SX 16 MHz

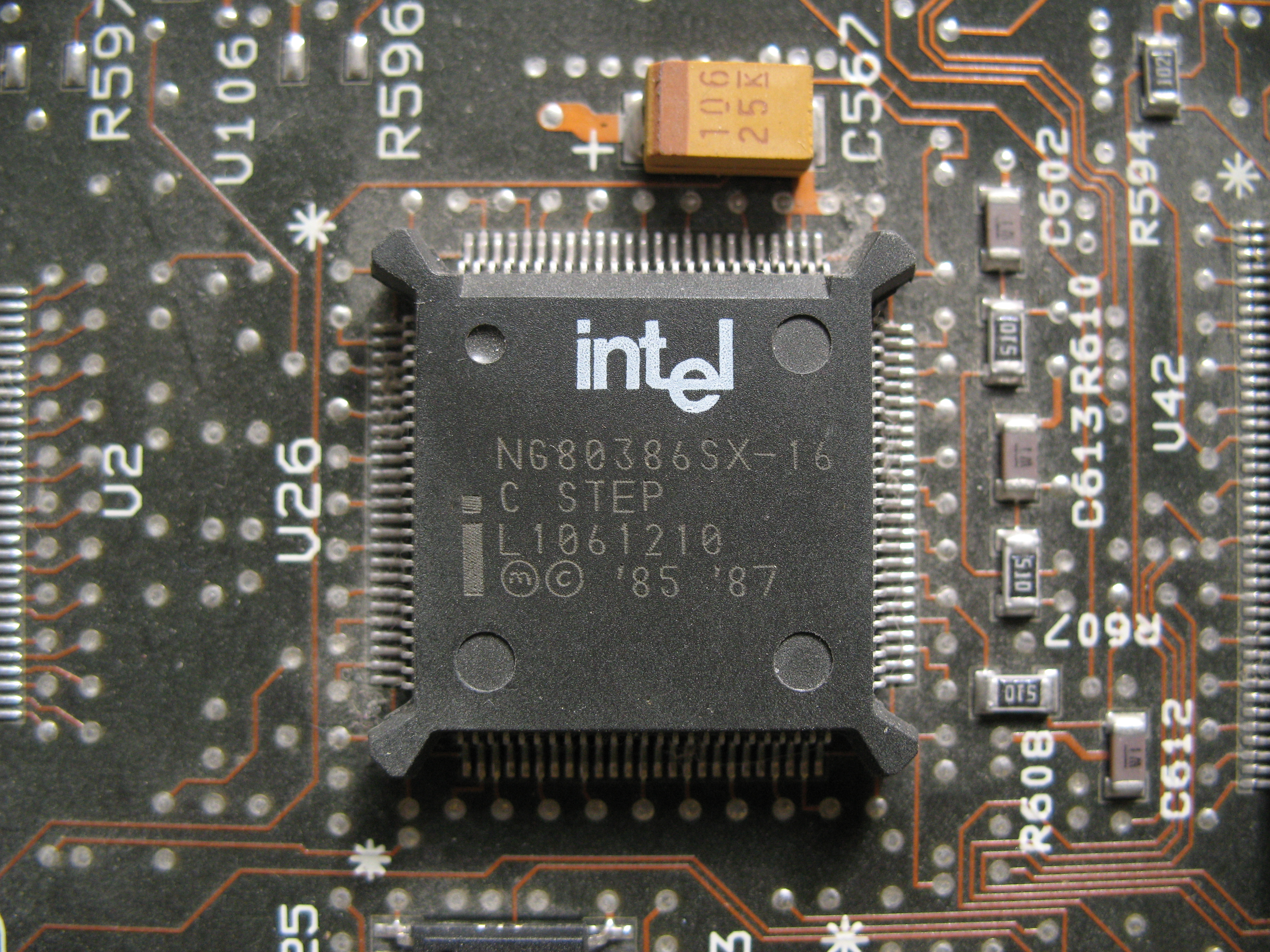
A surface-mount version of Intel 80386SX processor in a Compaq Deskpro computer. It is non-upgradable unless hot-air circuit-board rework is performed.

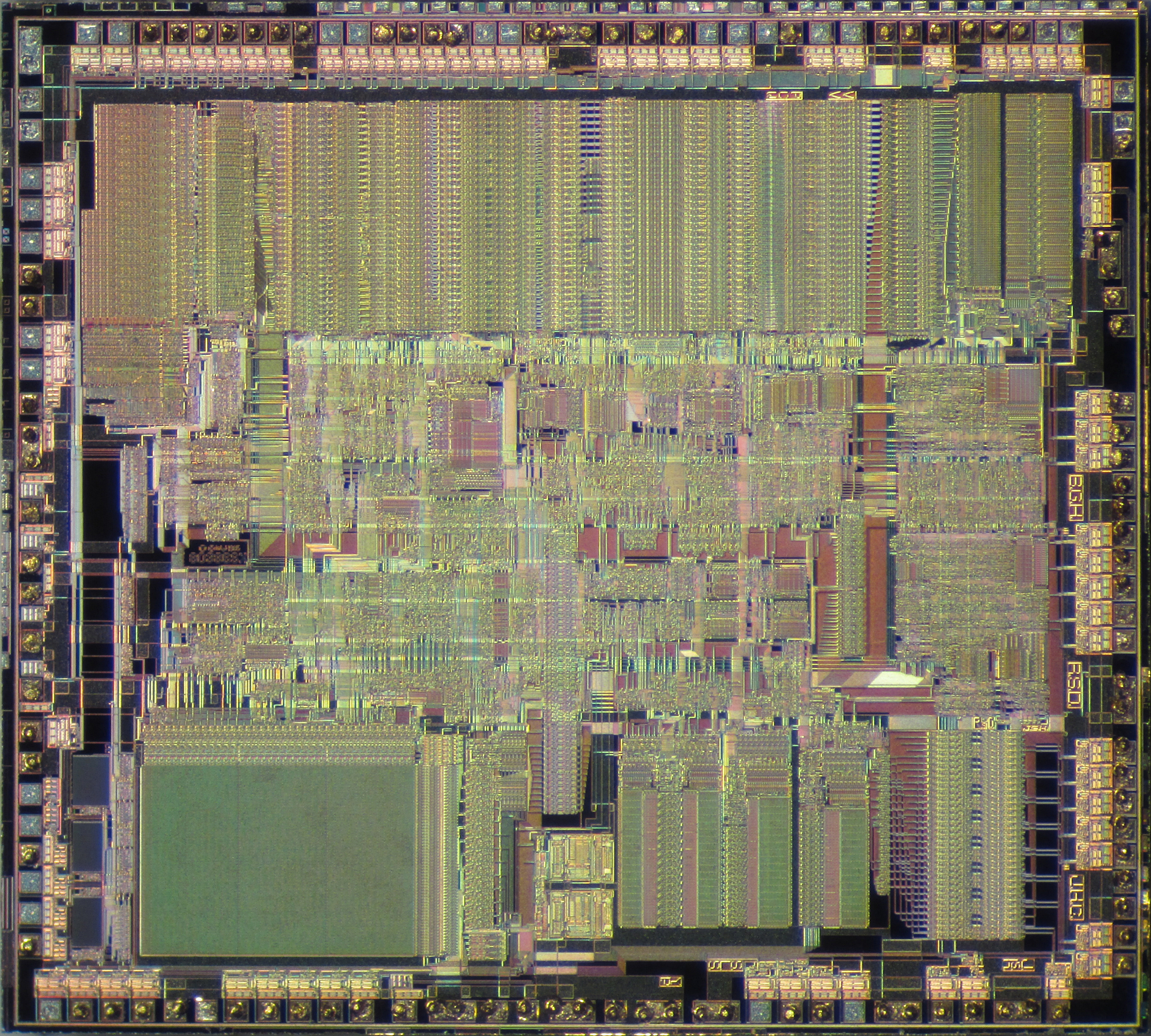
Die of Intel 80386SX

==== 80386SL ====
The 80386SL was introduced as a power-efficient version for laptop computers. The processor offered several power-management options (e.g. SMM), as well as different "sleep" modes to conserve battery power. It also contained support for an external cache of 16 to 64 KB. The extra functions and circuit implementation techniques caused this variant to have over 3 times as many transistors as the i386DX. The i386SL was first available at 20 MHz clock speed, with the 25 MHz model later added. With this system, it reduced up to 40% foot space than the Intel386 SX system. That translate to lighter and more portable cost-effective system.

Dave Vannier, the chief architect designed this microprocessor. It took them two years to complete this design since it uses the existing 386 architecture to implement. That assist with advanced computer-aided design tools which includes a complete simulation of system board. This die contains the 386 CPU core, AT Bus Controller, Memory Controller, Internal Bus Controller, Cache Control Logic along with Cache Tag SRAM and Clock. This CPU contains 855,000 transistors using one-micron CHMOS IV technology. It was available for $176 in 1,000 unit in quantities. The 25-MHz version was available in samples for $189 in 1,000-piece quantities, that version was finally made available in production by the end of 1991. It supports up to 32 MB of physical address space. There was a 20-MHz cacheless version of Intel386 SL microprocessor, at the press time samples of this version were available for $101 in 1,000-piece quantities. There were low-voltage 20-Mhz version and cacheless 16- and 20-Mhz version microprocessors. These low voltage uses 3.3 Volts to supplied them and they do support full static mode as well. They were available for $94, $48, and $78 respectively in 1,000 pieces quantities.

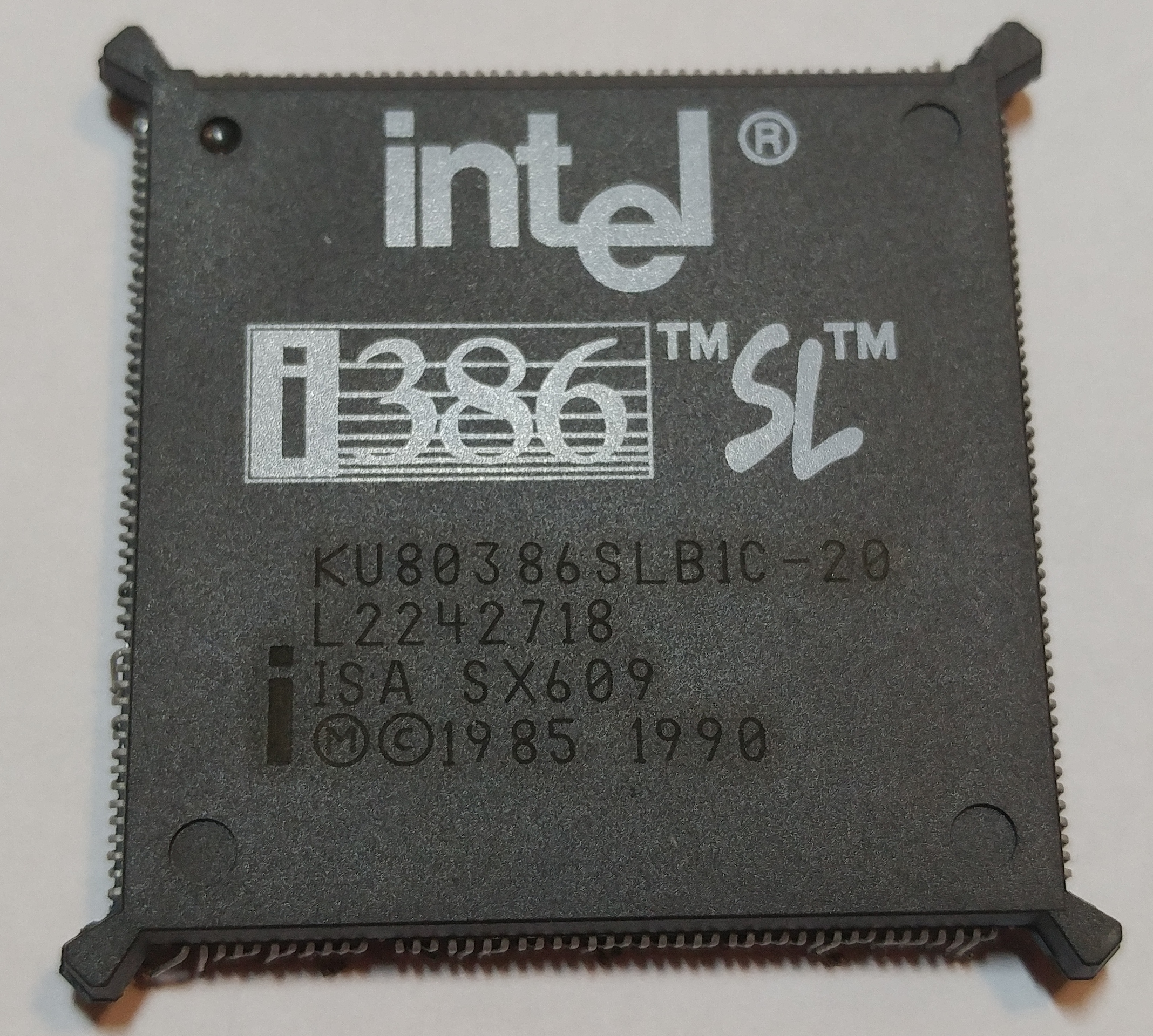
i386SL from 1990

==== SnapIn 386 ====
In May 1991, Intel introduced an upgrade for IBM PS/2 Model 50 and 60 systems which contain 80286 microprocessors, converting them to 32-bit systems. The SnapIn 386 module is a daughtercard with 20-MHz 386SX and 16-Kbyte direct-mapped cache SRAM memory. It directly plugs into the existing 286 socket with no cables, jumpers or switches. In the winter of 1992, an additional to this module now supported to IBM PS/2 Model 50 Z, 30 286 and 25 286 systems. Both modules were available for $495.

==== RapidCAD ====
A specially packaged Intel 486DX and a dummy floating-point unit (FPU) designed as pin-compatible replacements for an i386 processor and i387 FPU.

=== Versions for embedded systems ===
==== 80376 ====
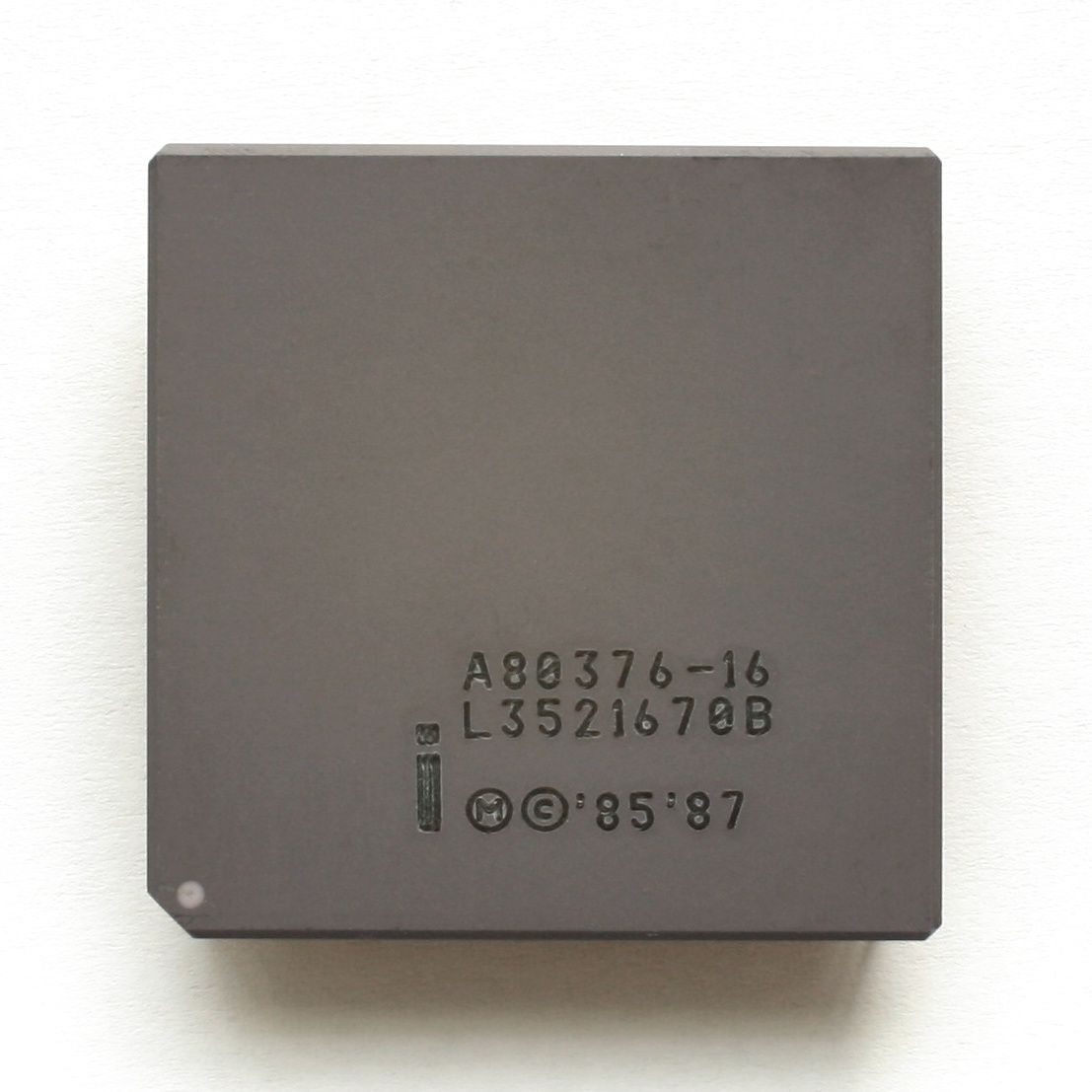
The Intel i376.

The Intel 80376, introduced January 16, 1989, was a variant of the Intel 80386SX intended for embedded systems. It differed from the 80386 in not supporting real mode (the processor booted directly into 32-bit protected mode) and having no support for paging in the MMU. The 376 was available at 16 or 20 MHz clock rates.

This processor can perform up to 3.0 MIPS at 16 MHz speed. It offers from 70 to 80 percent of the performance with 80386 at the same clock speed. This processor has external 16-bit bus with internal 32-bit bus. The Intel 82370 chipset which contains 8 DMA channels, 15 interrupts, 4 16-bit timer/counters, DRAM refresh controller, and wait-state generator which it is closely coupled with this processor, but it is software compatible to Intel 82380 chipset. Both devices are packaged with 100-pin BQFP. The 80376 and the 82370 version also have 88-PGA and 132-PGA package as well respectively. The plastic version of 80376 were US$99 and 82370 were US$57 in quantities of 100 respectively.

It was replaced with the much more successful 80386EX from 1994, and was finally discontinued on June 15, 2001.

==== i386EX, i386EXTB and i386EXTC ====
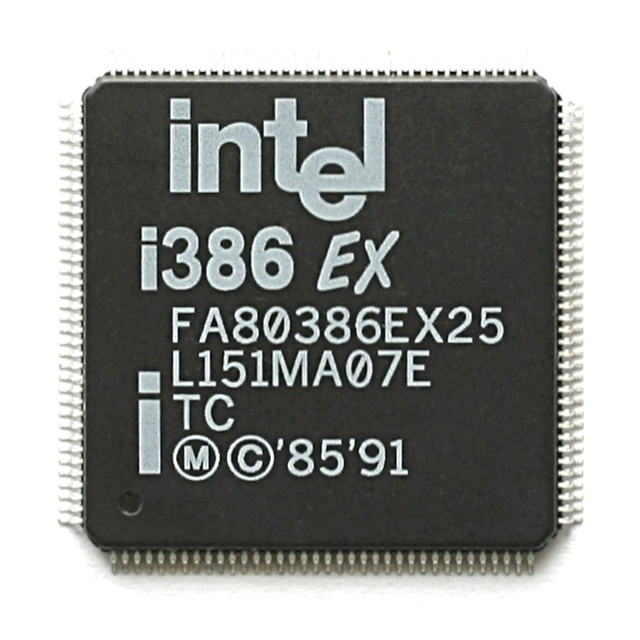
Intel i386EXTC, 25 MHz

System and power management and built in peripheral and support functions: Two 82C59A interrupt controllers; Timer, Counter (3 channels); Asynchronous SIO (2 channels); Synchronous SIO (1 channel); Watchdog timer (Hardware/Software); PIO. Usable with 80387SX or i387SL FPUs.

- Data/address bus: 16 / 26 bits
- Package: PQFP-132, SQFP-144 and PGA-168
- Process: CHMOS V, 0.8 μm
- Specified max clock:
  - i386EX: 16 MHz @2.7–3.3 volts or 20 MHz @3.0–3.6 volts or 25 MHz @4.5–5.5 volts
  - i386EXTB: 20 MHz @2.7–3.6 volts or 25 MHz @3.0–3.6 volts
  - i386EXTC: 25 MHz @4.5–5.5 volts or 33 MHz @4.5–5.5 volts

==== Intel386 CX ====
The Intel386 CX processor were available in sample around December 1993, but planned in production in the third quarter of 1994. Pricing for this version for 1994 in US$27.30 in 5,000-pieces quantities.

==== i386CXSA and i386SXSA (or i386SXTA) ====
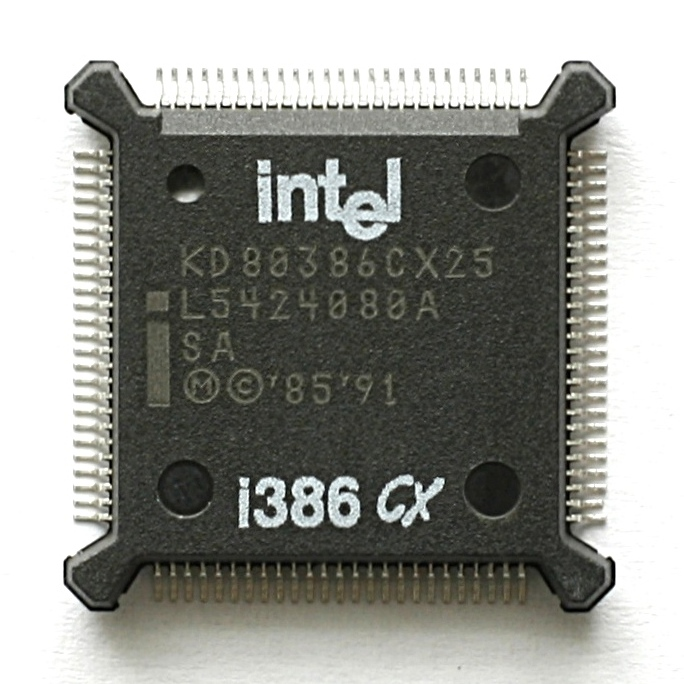
Intel i386CXSA, 25 MHz

Transparent power management mode, integrated MMU and TTL compatible inputs (only 386SXSA). Usable with i387SX or i387SL FPUs.

- Data/address bus: 16 / 26 bits (24 bits for i386SXSA)
- Package: BQFP-100
- Voltage: 4.5–5.5 volts (25 and 33 MHz); 4.75–5.25 volts (40 MHz)
- Process: CHMOS V, 0.8 μm
- Specified max clock: 25, 33, 40 MHz

==== i386CXSB ====
Transparent power management mode and integrated MMU. Usable with i387SX or i387SL FPUs.

- Data/address bus: 16 / 26 bits
- Package: BQFP-100
- Voltage: 3.0 volts (16 MHz) or 3.3 volts (25 MHz)
- Process: CHMOS V, 0.8 μm
- Specified max clock: 16, 25 MHz

==== E3G / 80386BX ====
Intel 386-based processor designed for use in smartphones, with integrated peripherals such as two 8259A interrupt controllers, two 16550 UARTs, LCD controller, keyboard scan controller, real-time clock and others. Used in the Nokia 9000 Communicator, released in 1996.

- Data/address bus: 16 / 26 bits (22 external bits)
- Package: TQFP-176
- Voltage: 3.3 volts
- Specified max clock: 25 MHz (internal clock), 33 MHz (external clock)

== Obsolescence ==
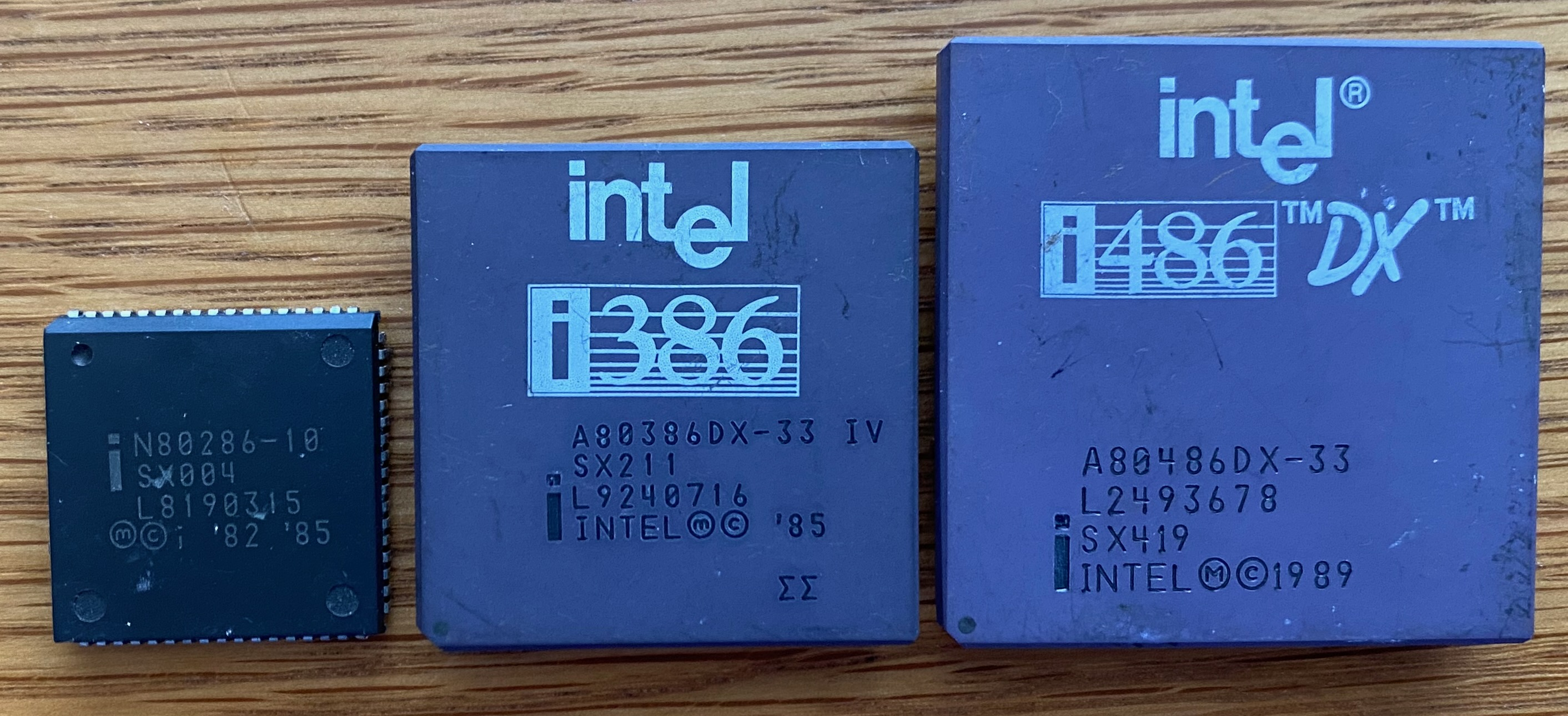
Size comparison of the 286, 386 and 486

Windows 95 was the only entry in the Windows 9x series to officially support the 386, requiring at least a 386DX, though a 486 or better was recommended; Windows 98 requires a 486DX or higher. In the Windows NT family, Windows NT 3.51 was the last version with 386 support.

Debian GNU/Linux dropped 386 support with the release of 3.1 (Sarge) in 2005 and completely removed support in 2007 with 4.0 (Etch). Citing the maintenance burden around SMP primitives, the Linux kernel developers cut support from the development codebase in December 2012, later released as kernel version 3.8.

Among the BSDs, FreeBSD's 5.x releases were the last to support the 386; support for the 386SX was cut with release 5.2, while the remaining 386 support was removed with the 6.0 release in 2005. OpenBSD removed 386 support with version 4.2 (2007), DragonFly BSD with release 1.12 (2008), and NetBSD with the 5.0 release (2009).

== Microcode reverse engineering ==
In May 2026, the Intel 80386 microcode was reverse engineered and publicly disassembled by a group including reenigne, Daniel Balsom ("gloriouscow"), Smartest Blob, nand2mario, and Ken Shirriff. The work reconstructed the processor's 37-bit microinstruction format and identified over 200 microcode entry points, revealing details of the 80386 instruction decoder, protection logic, paging behavior, and internal execution units. The reverse engineering effort also demonstrated that all documented 80386 instructions are implemented through microcode, unlike some earlier and later x86 processors which execute certain instructions entirely in hardwired logic. The source code was published on GitHub. When run on the X386 FPGA, the microcode can boot DOS 6 and DOS 7, it can run protected-mode programs DOS/4GW and DOS/32A, and it can play Doom and Cannon Fodder.

== See also ==
- List of Intel microprocessors
