= Elton, Wisconsin =

- Unincorporated community
- Location within Wisconsin Location within the United States
- Coordinates: 45°10′06″N 88°53′11″W
- Country: United States
- State: Wisconsin
- County: Langlade
- Town: Evergreen
- Elevation: 1,388 ft (423 m)
- Time zone: UTC-6 (Central (CST))
  - Summer (DST): UTC-5 (CDT)
- ZIP code: 54430
- Area codes: 715 & 534
- GNIS feature ID: 1564595

Elton is an unincorporated community located in Langlade County, Wisconsin, United States. Elton is located on Wisconsin Highway 64 east of Antigo, in the town of Evergreen. Elton established a post office in 1883, and it still operates today.

Elton is named after Elton C. Larzelere, whose father, Charles De Langlade helped organize Langlade County in 1879. In 1886, Charles and several others secured permission from the Langlade County Board to create the township of Elton, set off from Langlade Township. The Chicago and Northwestern previously had a line through the community.
