= MagIndustries =

Canadian mining company

- Type: Publicly traded
- Industry: Mining
- Founded: 1997
- Headquarters: Toronto, Canada
- Products: Potash, Magnesium
- Website: None

MagIndustries was a Canadian mining company focused primarily on the development of a major potash project in the Republic of the Congo. At its peak, the company had multiple divisions involved in energy, forestry, and mineral processing. It was majority owned by Chinese conglomerate Evergreen Holding Group before collapsing amid corruption investigations.

== History ==
=== Formation and Early Focus ===
MagIndustries was established in 1997 as Congo Minerals Inc., with an initial focus on magnesium production in the Republic of the Congo. It signed an agreement with the Congolese Ministry of Mines in the Kouilou region and targeted development near the old Holle mine. It became publicly traded via a reverse takeover of Clavos Enterprises and rebranded as Magnesium Alloy Corporation.

Initial leadership included George Creber (Chairman), William Burton (Executive VP), and Kim Barkan (VP). Board members included financier Stephen Dattels and Patrick Mitchell.

In February 2005, the company changed its name to MagIndustries to reflect a diversified portfolio: MagMining (potash), MagEnergy (hydropower), MagMetals (magnesium smelting), MagMinerals (potash processing), and MagForestry (eucalyptus plantations).

=== Potash Expansion ===
Between 2007 and 2009, the company advanced its flagship Mengo Potash Project. A feasibility study was completed in 2008, and it signed a mining investment agreement with the Congolese government granting a 10-year tax holiday. It raised over $100 million in private placements and received support from fertilizer distributor Ameropa Holding.

Eni signed a natural gas supply deal for the project’s large energy needs. At one point in 2008, MagIndustries was the third-largest mining firm by market capitalization on the TSX Venture Exchange.

=== Struggles with Financing ===
Despite early success, MagIndustries was unable to secure the US$1.4 billion in project financing due to the 2008 financial crisis, falling potash prices, and lack of investor familiarity with Congo. Chinese SOEs like Sinohydro and Complant were considered as partners, but talks broke down. A proposed deal with TSC Capital also failed.

=== Acquisition by Evergreen ===
In 2011, China’s Evergreen Holding Group, a private shipbuilder, acquired a 76% stake for $115 million. The company remained listed on the TSX, but investor confidence eroded. While in 2013 China Development Bank issued a $740 million financing commitment, this only temporarily boosted investor sentiment.

=== Bribery Investigation and Collapse ===
In March 2010, former executive Willy Verbrugghe filed a wrongful dismissal claim alleging he was fired for exposing illegal payments to Congolese officials. In January 2015, the RCMP raided MagIndustries’ Toronto offices based on a corruption probe.

The company’s internal probe confirmed improper payments, including bribes in the form of cash, real estate, vehicles, and gifts. Evergreen refused to fund continued investigations. Amid a bond default in China, MagIndustries’ board resigned, financial filings ceased, and it was delisted from the TSX in August 2015.

== Operations ==
=== Mengo Potash Project ===
MagIndustries’ flagship asset was the Mengo Potash Project near Pointe-Noire, Republic of the Congo. The project had a planned capacity of 600,000 tonnes per year and required over US$1.4 billion for full development.

=== Other Divisions ===
- MagEnergy: Worked on refurbishing the Inga II hydroelectric dam in the Democratic Republic of the Congo.
- MagMetals: Planned magnesium smelter co-located with the potash facility.
- MagForestry: Managed a 68,000-hectare eucalyptus plantation for biomass production.

== See also ==
- Kore Potash - Next door neighbor potash project
