= Kore Potash =

- Type: Public
- Traded as: ASX: KP2
- Industry: Mining
- Founded: 2004; 22 years ago
- Headquarters: London, United Kingdom
- Key people: Sean Bennett (CEO); David Hathorn (Chairman)
- Products: Potash
- Website: korepotash.com

Kore Potash is a mining company incorporated in the United Kingdom developing a potash project in the Republic of Congo.

== Corporate affairs ==
The company is publicly traded with a primary listing on the Australian Securities Exchange and has concurrent secondary listings on the Alternative Investment Market of the London Stock Exchange and Johannesburg Stock Exchange. It raised US$13 million in its debut on secondary markets in March 2018.

The secondary listings on the LSE and JSE were intended to expose the company to investors more accustomed to African projects. The company's main investors are SGRF, the sovereign wealth fund of Oman, and SQM, a Chilean mining company.

== Project ==
The company is pursuing development of the Sintoukola potash project in the Kouilou Department, Republic of Congo. The company's announced plans are to begin producing in 2022 and eventually reach 2 million tonnes per year in output.

== See also ==
- MagIndustries - Next door neighbor, a potash mining company with an advanced stage project also in the Kouilou Department
