= New Albany, Pennsylvania =

Borough in Pennsylvania, US

- Borough
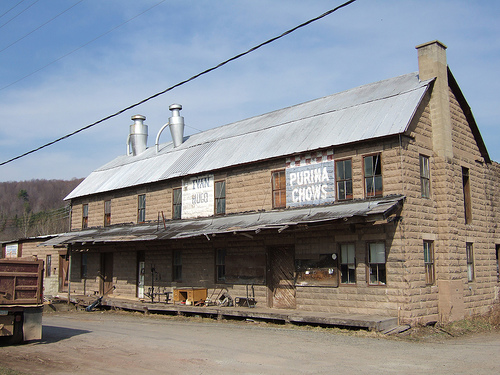
- A feed store in New Albany
- Nickname: Bigtown N'albny
- Motto: Established "A Long Time Ago"
- Location of New Albany in Bradford County, Pennsylvania.

- Location of New Albany in Pennsylvania
- Coordinates: 41°36′00″N 76°26′32″W
- Country: United States
- State: Pennsylvania
- County: Bradford
- Settled: 1819
- Incorporated (borough): 1879

Area
  - Total: 0.44 sq mi (1.13 km^{2})
  - Land: 0.44 sq mi (1.13 km^{2})
  - Water: 0 sq mi (0.00 km^{2})
- Elevation: 1,220 ft (370 m)

Population (2020)
  - Total: 251
  - Density: 575/sq mi (221.9/km^{2})
- Time zone: UTC-5 (Eastern (EST))
  - Summer (DST): UTC-4 (EDT)
- Zip Code: 18833
- Area code: 570
- FIPS code: 42-53152
- Website: new-albany.com

New Albany is a borough in Bradford County, Pennsylvania, United States. It is part of Northeastern Pennsylvania. The population was 254 at the 2020 census.

== Geography ==
New Albany is located in southern Bradford County at 41°36′2″N 76°26′30″W (41.600441, -76.441720). It is surrounded by Albany Township but separate from it.

U.S. Route 220 passes through the borough, leading north 13 miles (21 km) to Towanda, the county seat, and southwest 54 miles (87 km) to Williamsport. According to the U.S. Census Bureau, the borough has a total area of 0.46 square miles (1.2 km^{2}), all land.

== Demographics ==
Historical population
Census	Pop.	Note	%±
1880	222		—
1890	287		29.3%
1900	425		48.1%
1910	413		−2.8%
1920	315		−23.7%
1930	294		−6.7%
1940	334		13.6%
1950	365		9.3%
1960	359		−1.6%
1970	382		6.4%
1980	336		−12.0%
1990	306		−8.9%
2000	306		0.0%
2010	356		16.3%
2020	251		−29.5%
2021 (est.)	254	▲	1.2%

As of the census of 2000, there were 306 people, 126 households, and 77 families residing in the borough. The population density was 642.3 inhabitants per square mile (248.0/km^{2}). There were 147 housing units at an average density of 308.6 per square mile (119.2/km^{2}). The racial makeup of the borough was 99.02% White and 0.98% Native American. Hispanic or Latino of any race were 0.65% of the population.

There were 126 households, out of which 27.8% had children under the age of 18 living with them, 44.4% were married couples living together, 10.3% had a female householder with no husband present, and 38.1% were non-families. 31.0% of all households were made up of individuals, and 15.9% had someone living alone who was 65 years of age or older. The average household size was 2.43 and the average family size was 3.01.

In the borough the population was spread out, with 25.5% under the age of 18, 8.8% from 18 to 24, 27.8% from 25 to 44, 22.9% from 45 to 64, and 15.0% who were 65 years of age or older. The median age was 37 years. For every 100 females there were 108.2 males. For every 100 females age 18 and over, there were 88.4 males.

The median income for a household in the borough was $29,444, and the median income for a family was $29,464. Males had a median income of $31,875 versus $23,750 for females. The per capita income for the borough was $15,209. About 12.7% of families and 15.0% of the population were below the poverty line, including 16.4% of those under the age of eighteen and 22.5% of those sixty five or over.

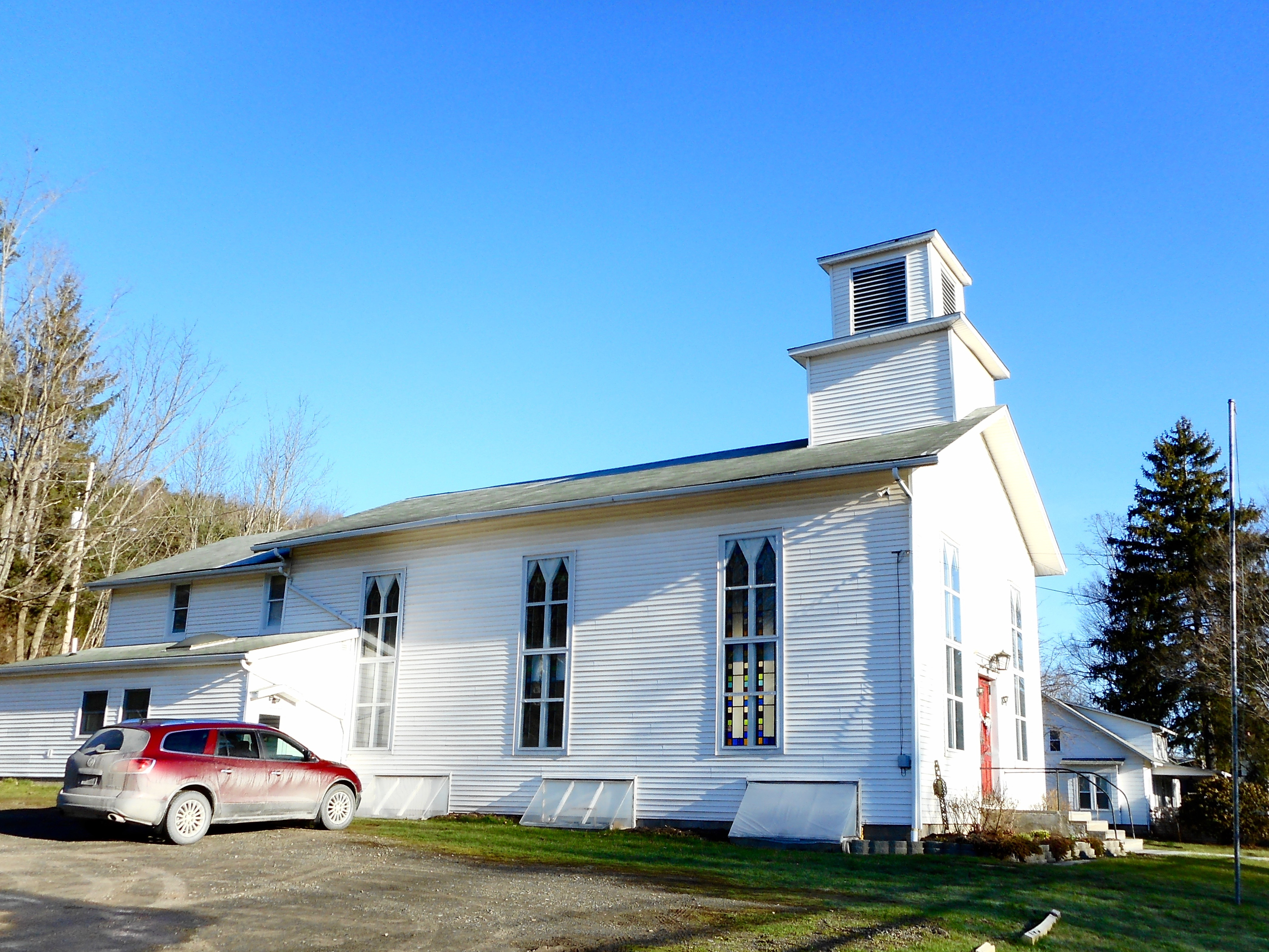
United Methodist Church
