= Evergreen Holding Group =

Holding company

- Type: Private
- Industry: Shipbuilding; Potash
- Founded: 2003
- Headquarters: Ningbo, China
- Key people: Liang Xiaolei (founder)
- Website: www.eigg.cn

Evergreen Holding Group (Chinese: 春和集团) is a Chinese holding company with interests in shipbuilding and potash mining. It is the controlling shareholder of MagIndustries, a Canadian potash mining company that owns a mining license for the Mengou potash project in the Republic of Congo, one of the largest greenfield potash mines in the world.

The company was founded in 2003 after the founder Liang Xiolei acquired the Zhejiang Shipyard in Ningbo and defunct Jiangyang Shipyard in Yangzhou. The shipbuilding business thrived in the 2000s with the company becoming among the 50 largest shipbuilders in the world by book orders in 2007. However, it would struggle in the next decade with the company failing to repay a loan in December 2015, defaulting on a 400 million RMB bond in 2016, and two of its shipyards entering bankruptcy in 2016.

The bond default caused consternation among bondholders who pointed out the inadequacy in disclosures by the company. An investor in the defaulted bond quoted in The Wall Street Journal was not aware of a corruption raid in Canada against the company's mining subsidiary MagIndustries until April 2015 at a bondholders meeting months after the raid occurred in January 2015. News of the raid on MagIndustries offices had been published on the website of MagIndustries in English.
