= Evergreen, Langlade County, Wisconsin =

Evergreen, Wisconsin
- Town
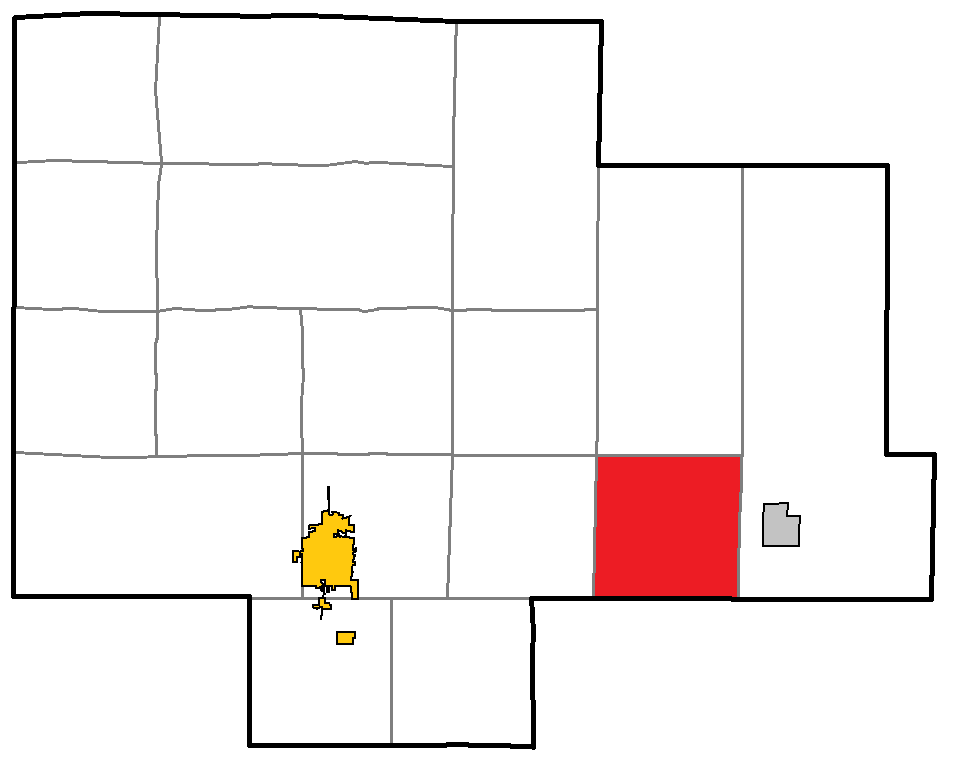
- Location of Evergreen, within Langlade County
- Coordinates: 45°9′10″N 88°52′19″W
- Country: United States
- State: Wisconsin
- County: Langlade

Area
  - Total: 36.15 sq mi (93.62 km^{2})
  - Land: 35.69 sq mi (92.44 km^{2})
  - Water: 0.46 sq mi (1.18 km^{2})
- Elevation: 1,362 ft (415 m)

Population (2020)
  - Total: 462
  - Density: 12.9/sq mi (5.00/km^{2})
- Time zone: UTC-6 (Central (CST))
  - Summer (DST): UTC-5 (CDT)
- ZIP Code: 54430 (Elton); 54418 (Bryant); 54491 (White Lake)
- Area codes: 715 & 534
- FIPS code: 55-067-24575
- GNIS feature ID: 1583178
- Website: https://townofevergreenwi.com/

Evergreen is a town in Langlade County, Wisconsin, United States. The population was 462 as of the 2020 census. The unincorporated communities of Elton and Four Corners are located in the town.

== Geography ==
Evergreen is in southeastern Langlade County and is bordered to the south by Menominee County. Elton, with its own post office, is in the center of Evergreen, along Wisconsin Highway 64. The town is 14 miles (23 km) east of Antigo, the county seat, and 6 miles (9.7 km) west of White Lake.

According to the United States Census Bureau, the town of Evergreen has a total area of 36.1 square miles (93.6 km^{2}), of which 35.7 square miles (92.4 km^{2}) are land and 0.46 square miles (1.2 km^{2}), or 1.26%, are water. The Evergreen River flows through the town. Its source is Flora Lake, which is located in the northeastern corner, near Four Corners.

== Demographics ==
As of the census of 2000, there were 468 people, 181 households, and 135 families residing in the town. The population density was 13.1 people per square mile (5/km^{2}). There were 218 housing units at an average density of 6.1 per square mile (2.3/km^{2}). The racial makeup of the town was 97.65% White, 0.43% Native American, 0.85% Asian, and 1.07% from two or more races. Hispanic or Latino people of any race were 0.43% of the population.

There were 181 households, out of which 29.3% had children under the age of 18 living with them, 64.1% were married couples living together, 5.5% had a female householder with no husband present, and 25.4% were non-families. 23.2% of all households were made up of individuals, and 13.3% had someone living alone who was 65 years of age or older. The average household size was 2.59 and the average family size was 3.05.

In the town, the population was spread out, with 27.4% under the age of 18, 4.1% from 18 to 24, 23.7% from 25 to 44, 28.4% from 45 to 64, and 16.5% who were 65 years of age or older. The median age was 42 years. For every 100 females, there were 113.7 males. For every 100 females age 18 and over, there were 111.2 males.

The median income for a household in the town was $30,536, and the median income for a family was $36,250. Males had a median income of $29,205 versus $18,125 for females. The per capita income for the town was $16,519. About 5.3% of families and 6% of the population were below the poverty line, including 4.1% of those under age 18 and 16.9% of those age 65 or over.
