= Evergreen (Booker T. Jones song) =

Song by Booker T.

from the album Evergreen
- A-side: "Evergreen"
- B-side: "Song For Casey"
- Released: 1974
- Label: Epic 8-50031
- Composer: Booker T. Jones
- Producer: Booker T. Jones

US chronology
"Evergreen" (1974)	"Mama Stewart" (1975)

"Evergreen" is a 1974 single by Booker T.. It registered in various charts that year, which included a nine-week run in the Billboard Easy Listening Top 50 chart.

== Background ==
"Evergreen" is a song by Booker T. It is from the album of the same name. Backed with "Song for Casey", "Evergreen" was released on Epic 8-50031 in 1974. Jones is both the composer and producer of the song.

Booker T. performed the song live at the Winterland in San Francisco on 10 December 1974.

== Reception ==
"Evergreen" was a Single Pick and had a positive review in the 28 September issue of Record World with the reviewer referring to his instrumental work as verdant funk.

The album was reviewed in the 26 October issue of Cash Box, where the title track ("Evergreen") was referred to as "Stunning".

== Charts ==
=== Cash Box ===
"Evergreen" debuted at No. 115 in the Cash Box Looking Ahead chart for the week of 26 October It peaked at No. 103 for the week of 7 December. It was still in the chart at No. 114 for the week of 4 January 1975.

=== Record World ===
"Evergreen" debuted at No. 110 in the Record World 101-150 Singles chart for the week of 9 November. The single had climbed up to No. 102 for the week of 23 November.

"Evergreen" debuted at No. 97 in the Record World Singles chart for the week of 30 November. It peaked at No. 90 for the week of 14 December.

=== Billboard ===
"Evergreen" debuted at No. 48 in the Billboard Easy Listening chart for the week of 30 November. Having been in the chart for six weeks, it peaked at No. 25 for the week of 14 December. At week nine, the single was still in the chart for the week of 4 January 1975.
