= Evergreen, Ohio =

Unincorporated community in Ohio, U.S.

Coordinates: 38°53′28″N 82°16′26″W

Evergreen is an unincorporated community in Gallia County, in the U.S. state of Ohio.

== History ==
Evergreen was platted in 1855. A post office called Evergreen was established in 1880, and remained in operation until 1927.
