= Evergreen Technologies =

Defunct American computer company

Evergreen Technologies, Inc.
- Company type: Private
- Industry: Computer
- Founded: 1989; 37 years ago in Corvallis, Oregon
- Defunct: 2005; 21 years ago
- Fate: Dissolution
- Number of employees: 70 (1997)

Evergreen Technologies, Inc., was a privately owned computer company active from 1989 to 2005 that manufactured a wide variety CPU upgrade chips for x86-based personal computers. Based in Corvallis, Oregon, the company enjoyed a heyday in the 1990s, becoming a market leader in the CPU upgrade segment.

== History ==
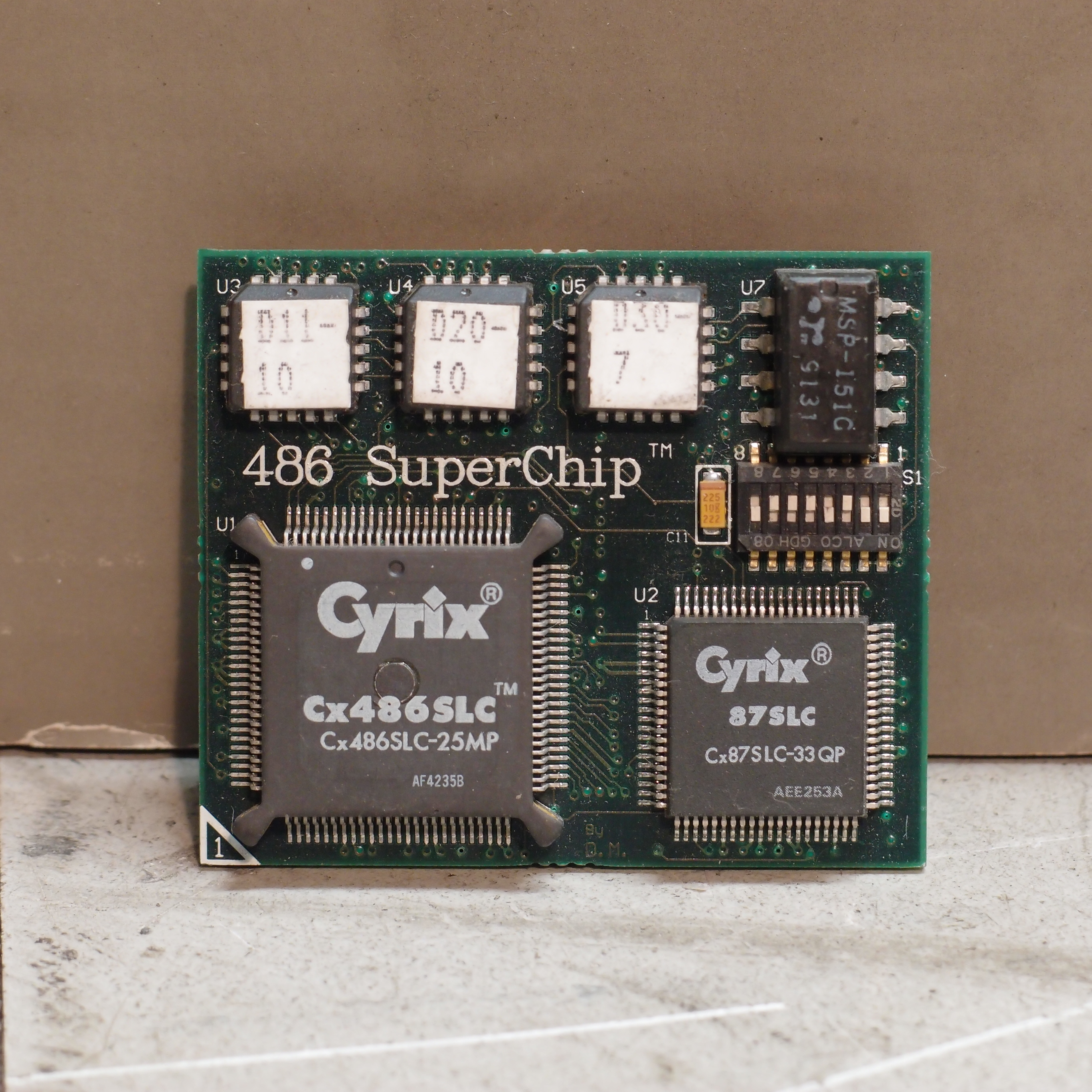
Evergreen Technologies's 486 SuperChip from 1992

Evergreen Technologies was founded in 1989 by Kenneth "Mike" Magee in Corvallis, Oregon. Before founding Evergreen, Magee previously worked as vice president of Software Support Services, a Corvallis-based software vendor; he had also previously founded M.S. Systems, Inc., a computer store in Corvallis. The company's first product, a CPU upgrade module that allowed motherboards with Intel 80286 processors to be upgraded to i386 processors, first shipped in May 1990. In 1992, Evergreen introduced the 486 SuperChip, a CPU upgrade module featuring Cyrix's Cx486 processor that allowed 286-class machines to achieve close to i486-level performance. Evergreen later signed a contract with IBM allowing the latter to capitalize on Evergreen's patents and circuit-board layouts for their 486 upgrade modules, in 1994.

At their heyday in the 1990s, Evergreen's largest competitors included Intel themselves, with their i486 and Pentium OverDrive chips, and Kingston Technology, with their TurboChip. Sales in Evergreen's upgrade modules grew 159-fold between 1993 and 1998; the company sold roughly 40 percent of their products to international buyers. By mid-1997, Evergreen had expanded to possess four buildings in Corvallis, a manufacturing plant in Portland, Oregon, a sales office in New York City and a regional office in Swindon, England. Between all locations, the company employed roughly 70 workers in that year.

In early 1999, the company introduced the AcceleraPCI (codenamed the EclipsePCI), an upgrade expansion card allowing motherboards with the Peripheral Component Interconnect (PCI) bus—with processors ranging from late-model DX4s to Pentiums to Pentium Pros—to be outfit with P6-based Celeron processors. Development of the AcceleraPCI was Evergreen's most expensive undertaking to date and was highly publicized in the tech press.

Evergreen went defunct in 2005.
