= Albany Township, Bradford County, Pennsylvania =

Township in Pennsylvania, US

Coordinates: 41°38′00″N 76°24′59″W

- Township
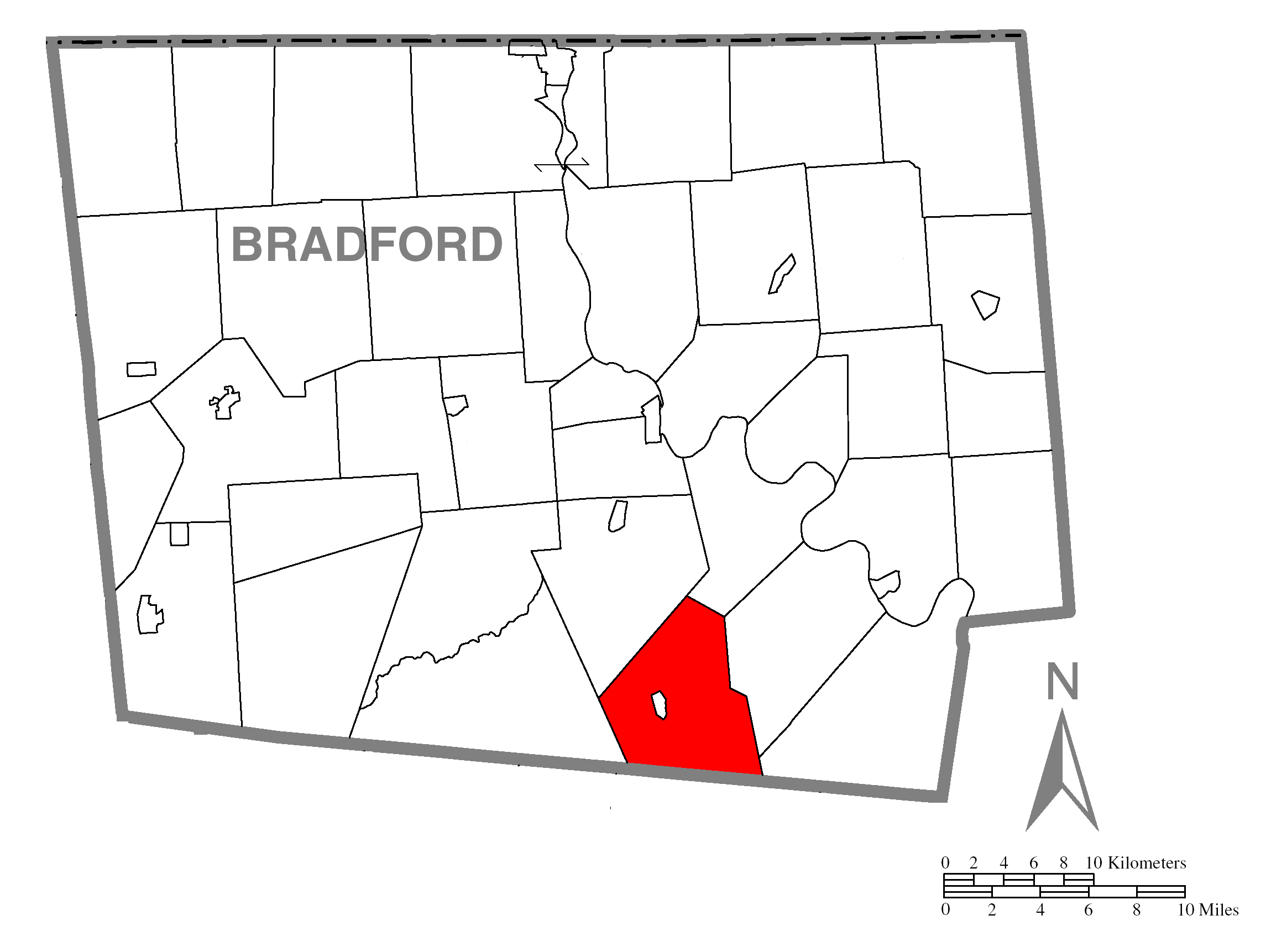
- Map of Bradford County with Albany Township highlighted

- Map of Bradford County, Pennsylvania
- Country: United States
- State: Pennsylvania
- County: Bradford
- Settled: 1800
- Incorporated: 1824

Area
  - Total: 32.86 sq mi (85.11 km^{2})
  - Land: 32.76 sq mi (84.84 km^{2})
  - Water: 0.10 sq mi (0.27 km^{2})

Population (2020)
  - Total: 859 ▼
  - Estimate (2023): 866
  - Density: 27.1/sq mi (10.47/km^{2})
- FIPS code: 42-015-00596

Albany Township is a township in Bradford County, Pennsylvania, United States. It is part of Northeastern Pennsylvania. The population was 859 at the 2020 census.

== Geography ==
Albany Township is located in southern Bradford County, along the Sullivan County line. It is bordered by Overton Township to the southwest, Monroe Township to the northwest, Asylum Township to the northeast, Terry Township and Wilmot Township to the east, and Cherry Township in Sullivan County to the south. Albany Township surrounds the borough of New Albany but is separate from it. The unincorporated community of Evergreen is northeast of New Albany.

U.S. Route 220 runs through the township, leading north to Towanda and south to Dushore and Laporte.

According to the U.S. Census Bureau, the township has a total area of 32.9 square miles (85.1 km^{2}), of which 32.7 square miles (84.8 km^{2}) is land and 0.12 square miles (0.3 km^{2}), or 0.31%, is water.

== Demographics ==
Historical population
Census	Pop.	Note	%±
2010	911		—
2020	859		−5.7%
2023 (est.)	866		0.8%
U.S. Decennial Census

As of the census of 2000, there were 927 people, 362 households, and 276 families residing in the township. The population density was 28.8 inhabitants per square mile (11.1/km^{2}). There were 495 housing units at an average density of 15.4/sq mi (5.9/km^{2}). The racial makeup of the township was 97.52% White, 1.08% Native American, 0.11% Asian, and 1.29% from two or more races. Hispanic or Latino of any race were 0.32% of the population.

There were 362 households, out of which 34.0% had children under the age of 18 living with them, 64.1% were married couples living together, 7.5% had a female householder with no husband present, and 23.5% were non-families. 20.2% of all households were made up of individuals, and 8.8% had someone living alone who was 65 years of age or older. The average household size was 2.56 and the average family size was 2.92.

In the township the population was spread out, with 25.9% under the age of 18, 6.1% from 18 to 24, 27.3% from 25 to 44, 27.5% from 45 to 64, and 13.2% who were 65 years of age or older. The median age was 40 years. For every 100 females, there were 106.9 males. For every 100 females age 18 and over, there were 101.5 males.

The median income for a household in the township was $36,932, and the median income for a family was $37,250. Males had a median income of $29,271 versus $21,838 for females. The per capita income for the township was $16,156. About 4.6% of families and 5.7% of the population were below the poverty line, including 7.2% of those under age 18 and 3.3% of those age 65 or over.
