= Evergreen River =

River in north east Wisconsin

- Location within Wisconsin Location within the United States

Location
- Country: United States
- State: Wisconsin

Physical characteristics
- Source: Northwest of White Lake
  - location: Flora Lake
  - coordinates: 45.1963581°N 88.8139965°W
- Mouth: Wolf River
  - location: South of Markton
  - coordinates: 45.0541444°N 88.6556613°W
  - elevation: 978 ft (298 m)

Basin features
- Tributaries
  - left: McCall Creek, Elton Creek Evergreen Creek
  - right: Deadman Creek

The Evergreen River is a river in north east Wisconsin that flows through Langlade and Menominee counties. The source of the river is Flora Lake in the Town of Evergreen. The Evergreen River conjoins the Wolf River south of Markton. The majority of land around the river is wooded and largely undeveloped.

The Evergreen River State Fishery Area follows the course of the river for a few miles in Langlade County. The land is owned and operated by the Wisconsin Department of Natural Resources.

== See also ==
- List of Wisconsin rivers
