= Evergreen (Booker T. album) =

Studio album by Booker T.
- Released: 1974
- Studios: Record Plant, Sausalito
- Label: Epic KE 33143
- Producer: Booker T. Jones

Booker T. chronology
Chronicles (1973)	Evergreen (1974)	Try and Love Again (1978)

Evergreen is a 1974 album by the American musician Booker T. that was released on the Epic label. It contains the hit instrumental "Evergreen".

== Background ==
The ten-track album was released by Epic Records in 1974. The album was later reissued on compact disc in an expanded form in 2013. The re-release includes the extra tracks, "Evergreen" (single version), "Life Is Funky", "Take Me to the River", "Love is Strange" (with Priscilla Coolidge), "A Whiter Shade of Pale" and "(Your Love Has Lifted Me) Higher and Higher".

== Reception ==
The album was given a positive review in the 26 October issue of Cash Box where it was referred to as a "whirling dervish of musical brilliance and sensitivity". The tracks selected for mention were "Tennessee Voodoo", "Jamaica Song", "Why Me" and "Evergreen" which was referred to as stunning. Also in the same issue, David Budge said the album was excellent.

The record was Record World Album Pick for the week of 26 October. With the album being referred to as a fresh approach, the reviewer also wrote that his vocals enhanced the sweet tracks. Tracks selected for mention were, "Tennessee Voodoo", "Country Days" and "Evergreen".

== Tracks ==
=== Side A ===
1. "Jamaica Song" - 2:25
2. "Mama Stewart" - 2:52
3. "Tennessee Voodoo" - 4:46
4. "Flamingo" - 3:38
5. "Song for Casey" - 4:52

=== Side B ===
1. "Evergreen" - 6:30
2. "Country Days" - 4:35
3. "Why Me" - 3:35
4. "Front Street" Rag - 2:14
5. "Lie to Me" - 6:00

== Singles ==
"Evergreen" was backed with "Song for Casey" and released on Epic in 1974. It peaked at No. 102 on the Record World 101-150 Singles chart for the week of 23 November, and peaked at No. 90 on the Record World Singles chart for the week of 14 December. It peaked at No. 103 on the Cash Box Looking Ahead chart for the week of 7 December. It also peaked at No. 25 on the Billboard Top 50 Easy Listening chart for the week of 14 December.

"Mama Stewart" b/w "Front Street Rag" was released on Epic 8-50078 in 1974.
