= Evergreen, Bradford County, Pennsylvania =

Unincorporated community in Pennsylvania, US

Evergreen, Pennsylvania
- Unincorporated community
- Location within Pennsylvania
- Coordinates: 41°37′12″N 76°24′51″W
- Country: United States
- State: Pennsylvania
- County: Bradford
- Township: Albany
- Elevation: 1,362 ft (415 m)
- Time zone: UTC-5 (Eastern (EST))
  - Summer (DST): UTC-4 (EDT)
- Area code: 570
- GNIS feature ID: 1174360

Evergreen is an unincorporated community in Bradford County, Pennsylvania, United States.
