= Wisconsin Highway 52 =

State highway in Wisconsin, United States

State Trunk Highway 52
- WIS 52 highlighted in red

Route information
- Maintained by WisDOT
- Length: 76.3 mi (122.8 km)
- Existed: 1924–present

Major junctions
- West end: US 51 in Wausau (Note: This interchange, completed in 2013, extended WIS 52 westerly past its previous western terminus for about 600 feet (180 m) to connect with WIS 29.)
- US 45 in Aniwa; US 45 / WIS 47 / WIS 64 in Antigo
- East end: WIS 32 in Wabeno

Location
- Country: United States
- State: Wisconsin
- Counties: Marathon, Shawano, Langlade, Forest

Highway system
- Wisconsin State Trunk Highway System; Interstate; US; State; Scenic; Rustic
← WIS 51	→ US 53

State Trunk Highway 52 (often called Highway 52, STH-52 or WIS 52) is a state highway in the U.S. state of Wisconsin. It runs east–west in central and northeastern Wisconsin from Wabeno to Wausau. It is one of four state highways that also serve Antigo.

== Route description ==
Running from west to east, WIS 52 begins at an interchange with U.S. Highway 51 (US 51) freeway, which serves as Wausau's western bypass. It then enters Wausau as Bridge Street, crossing the Wisconsin River into downtown.

North of downtown Wausau, WIS 52 runs on a pair of one-way streets.

Northeast of Wausau, WIS 52 runs past Hogerty, with access to the Dells of the Eau Claire River Park, a popular recreational park and campground known for its rock formations and waterfalls; the Ice Age Trail also runs through the park.

Just past Marathon County, WIS 52 meets up with US 45 and joins it for the drive north to Antigo, the Langlade County seat. WIS 47 and WIS 64 also intersect WIS 52 along this stretch. From Antigo, WIS 52 zigzags northeast past Lily, where it has a junction with WIS 55 along the Wolf River. The road then enters the Nicolet National Forest and into Forest County before ending at WIS 32 just northwest of Wabeno.

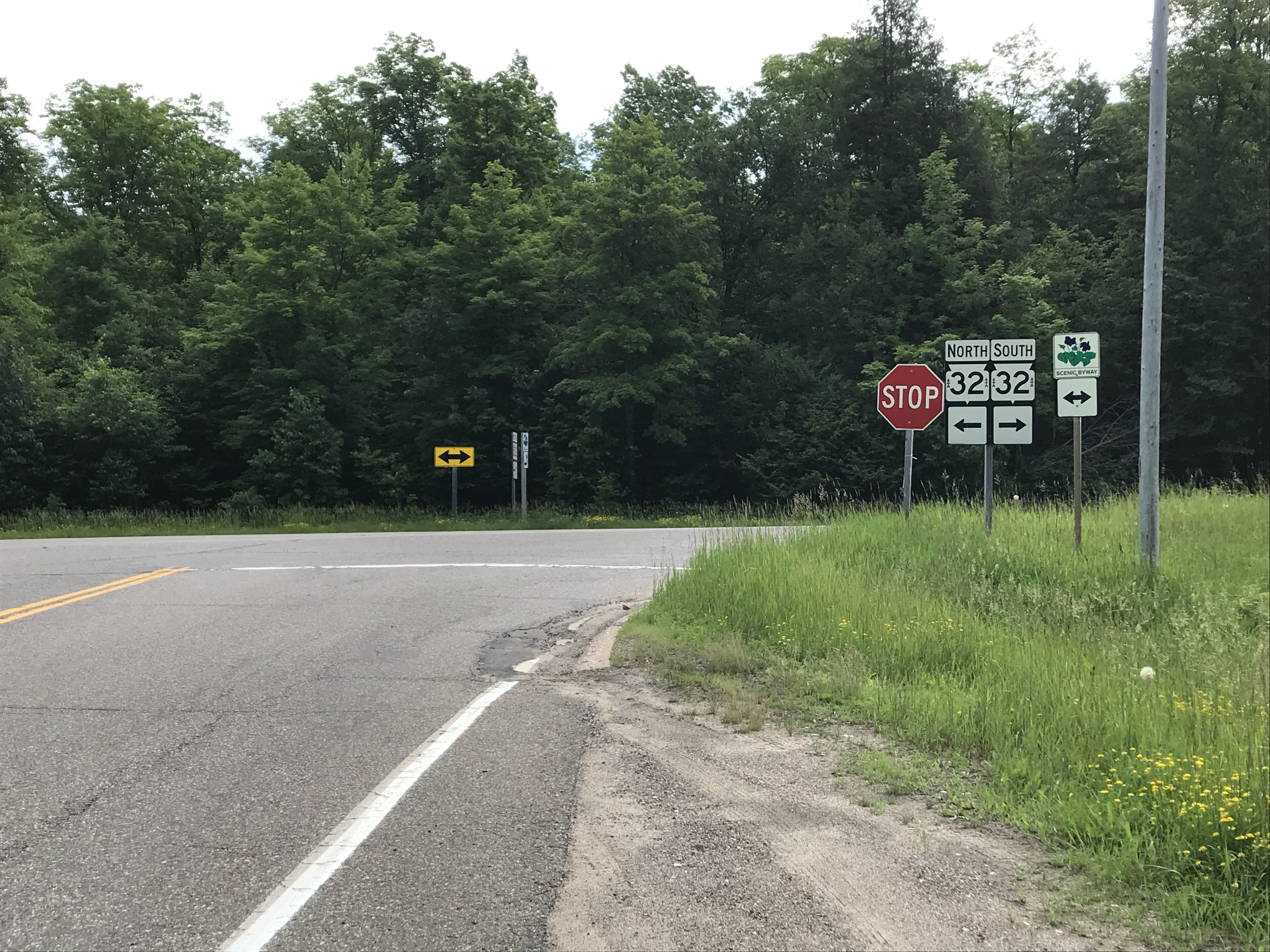
The northern terminus with WIS 32 near Wabeno

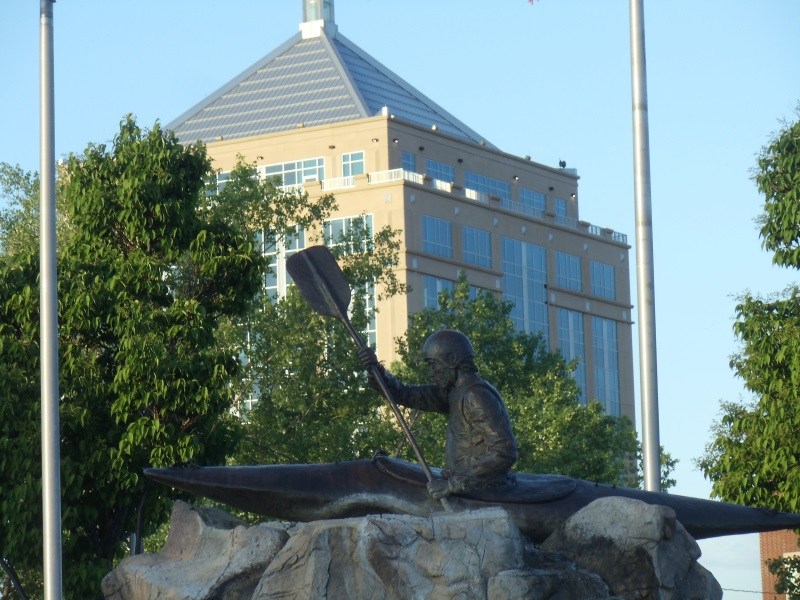
A kayak statue along the Wisconsin River where WIS 52 formerly entered downtown Wausau near the Dudley Tower

== History ==
In 2013, WIS 52 was extended 600 feet (180 m) because of the new interchange.

In 2025, WIS 52 was rerouted along Bridge Street instead of Stewart Avenue, avoiding the downtown area.

== Major intersections ==
County	Location	mi	km	Destinations	Notes
Marathon	Wausau			US 51 – Merrill, Stevens Point	Western terminus of WIS 52
Marathon	Wausau			Bus. US 51	
Shawano	Aniwa			US 45 south – Birnamwood, Wittenberg, Clintonville	Southern end of US 45 concurrency
Langlade	Town of Rolling			WIS 47 south – Keshena	Southern end of WIS 47 concurrency
Langlade	Antigo			US 45 north / WIS 47 north – Monico WIS 64 west – Merrill	Northern end of US 45/WIS 47 concurrency; western end of WIS 64 concurrency
Langlade	Langlade			WIS 64 east – Langlade	Eastern end of WIS 64 concurrency
Langlade	Lily			WIS 55 north – Crandon	Northern end of WIS 55 concurrency
Langlade	Lily			WIS 55 south – Langlade	Southern end of WIS 55 concurrency
Forest	Wabeno			WIS 32 – Laona, Wabeno	Eastern terminus of WIS 52
1.000 mi = 1.609 km; 1.000 km = 0.621 mi: Concurrency terminus
