= Pickerel, Wisconsin =

- Unincorporated community
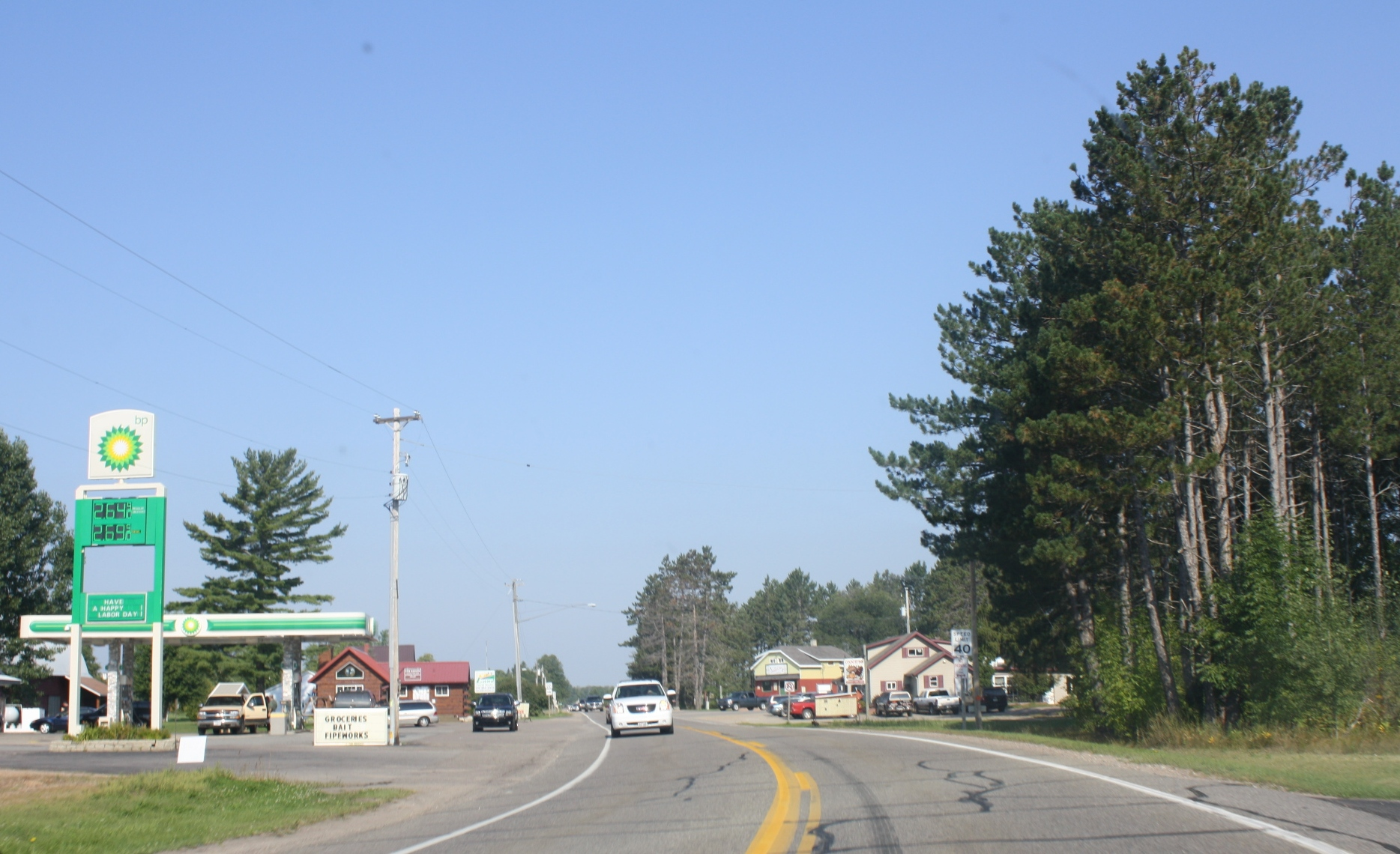
- Downtown Pickerel

- Location within Wisconsin Location within the United States
- Coordinates: 45°21′34″N 88°54′39″W
- Country: United States
- State: Wisconsin
- County: Langlade
- Town: Langlade
- Elevation: 1,555 ft (474 m)
- Time zone: UTC-6 (Central (CST))
  - Summer (DST): UTC-5 (CDT)
- ZIP code: 54465
- Area codes: 715 & 534
- GNIS feature ID: 1571309

Pickerel is an unincorporated community in the northeastern corner of Langlade County, Wisconsin, United States. The community is located on Wisconsin Highway 55, in the town of Langlade. Pickerel is 19 miles (31 km) northeast of Antigo, the county seat of Langlade County. Pickerel has a post office with ZIP code 54465. The Pickerel Volunteer Fire Department is located northwest of town on County Road T, and serves the town of Ainsworth, and part of the town of Nashville in Forest County.

The Pickerel Rescue Squad station is located south of town on State Highway 55, and provides ambulance services (EMS) to the towns of Ainsworth, Langlade, and part of the Town of Nashville. Pickerel Rescue is an Advanced life support unit.

== Images ==
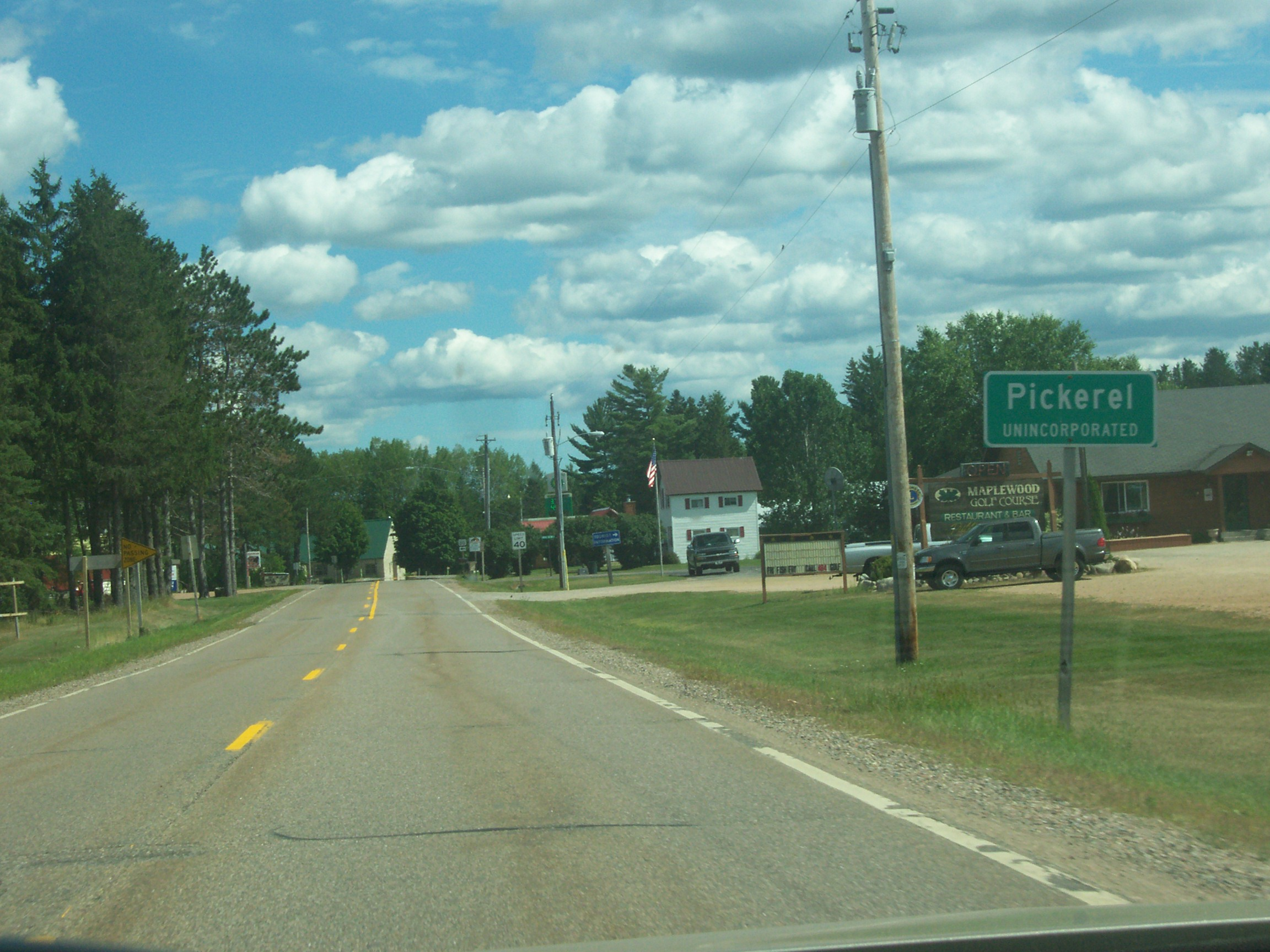
Looking south at Pickerel's entrance sign

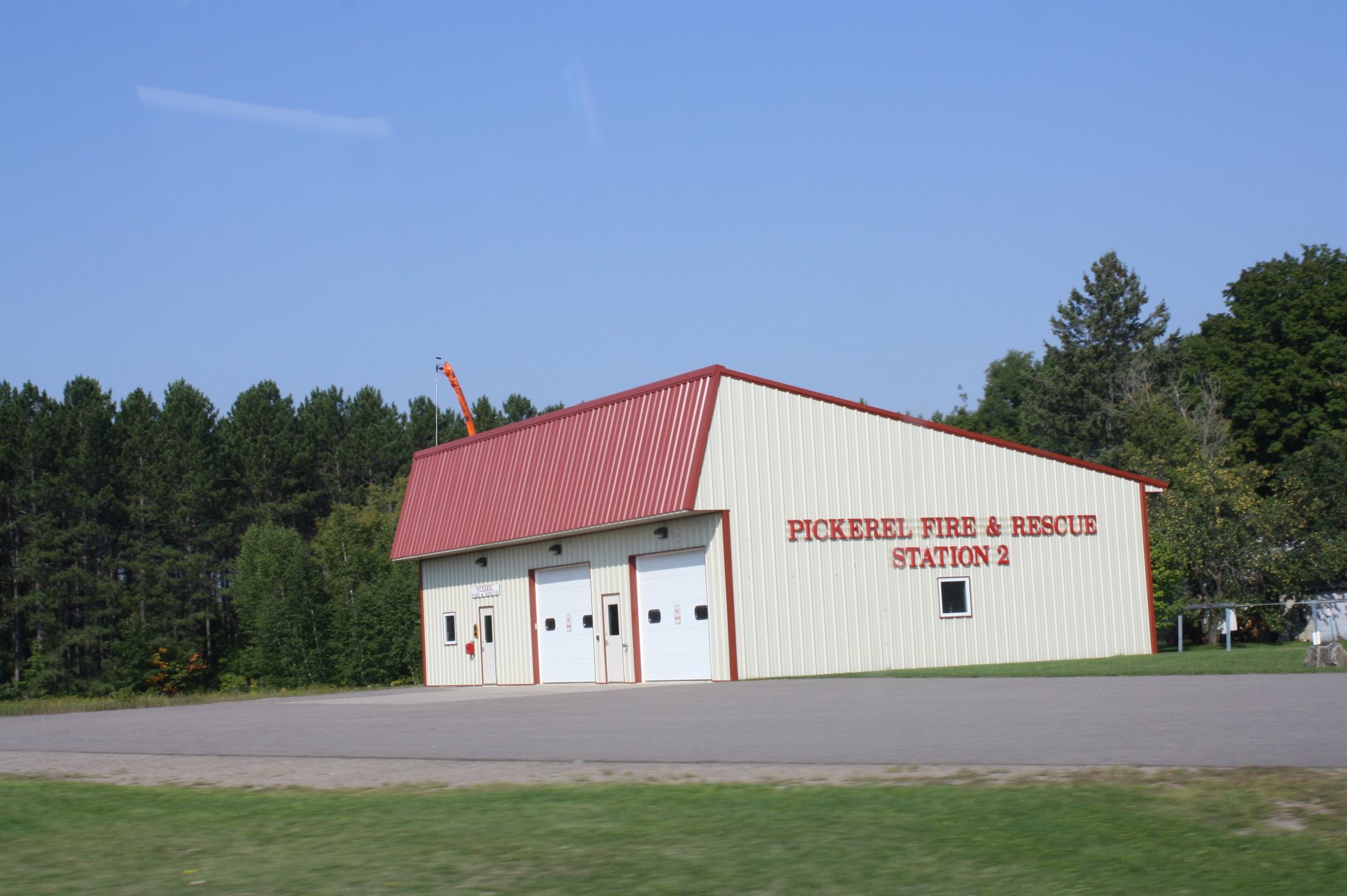
Pickerel Rescue Squad Station

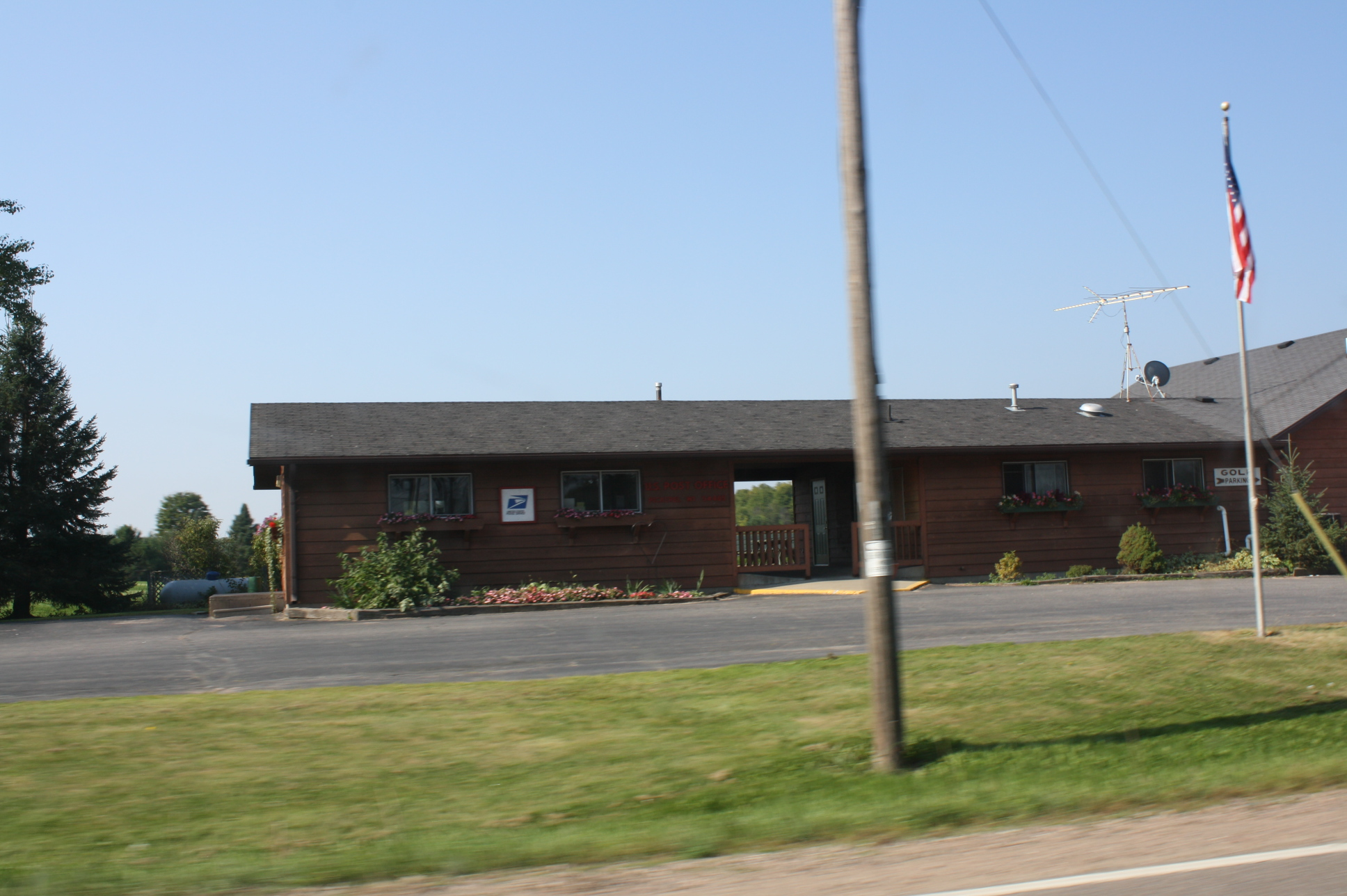
Post office

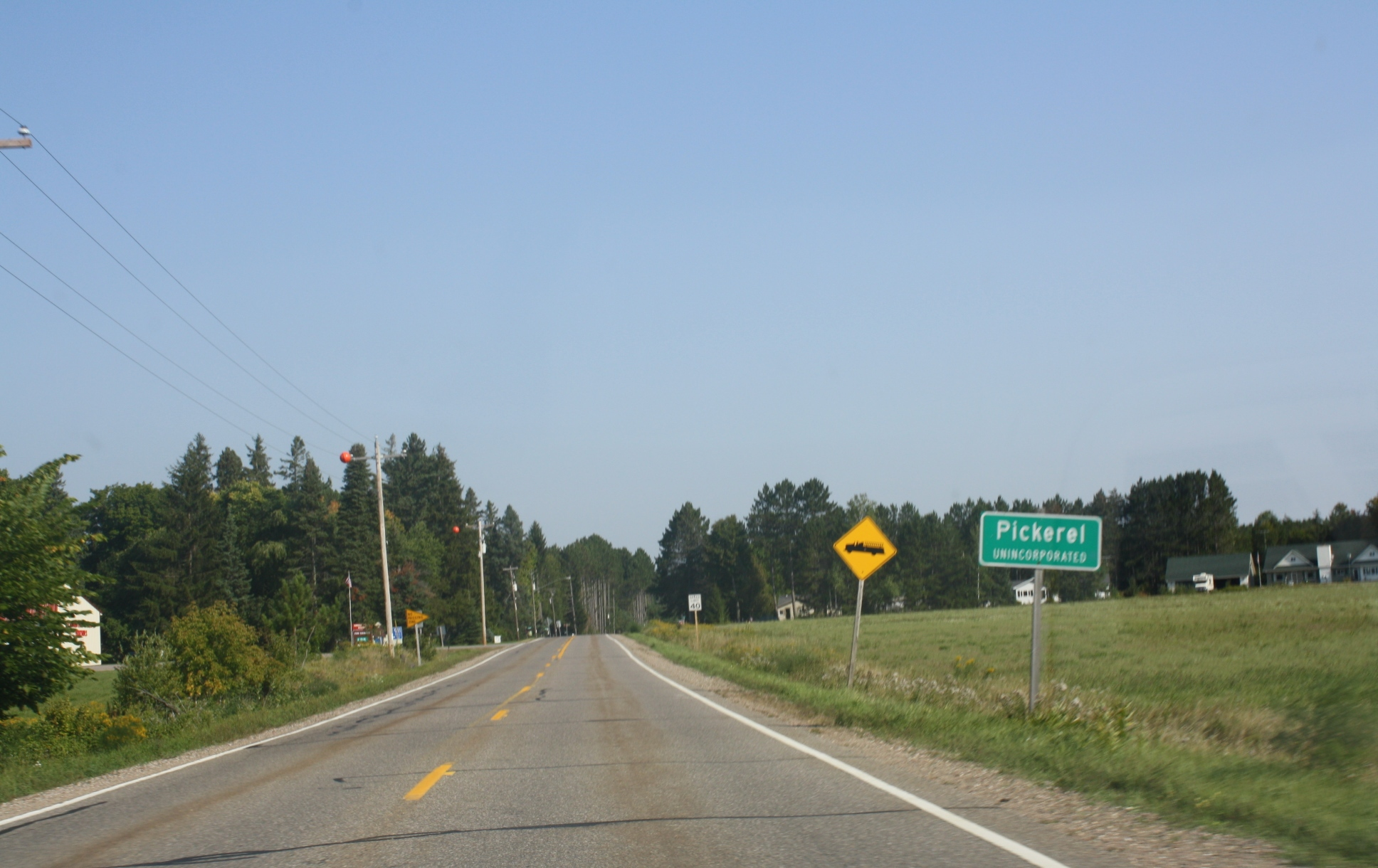
Looking north at Pickerel's entrance sign
