= Nelma, Wisconsin =

- Unincorporated community
- Location within Wisconsin Location within the United States
- Coordinates: 46°01′11″N 88°49′04″W
- Country: United States
- State: Wisconsin
- County: Forest
- Elevation: 1,558 ft (475 m)
- Time zone: UTC-6 (Central (CST))
  - Summer (DST): UTC-5 (CDT)
- Area code(s): 715 & 534
- GNIS feature ID: 1579997

Nelma is an unincorporated community in the town of Alvin, Forest County, Wisconsin, United States. Nelma is located on Wisconsin Highway 55 near the Michigan border, 31 miles (50 km) north of Crandon.
