= Lily, Wisconsin =

- Unincorporated community
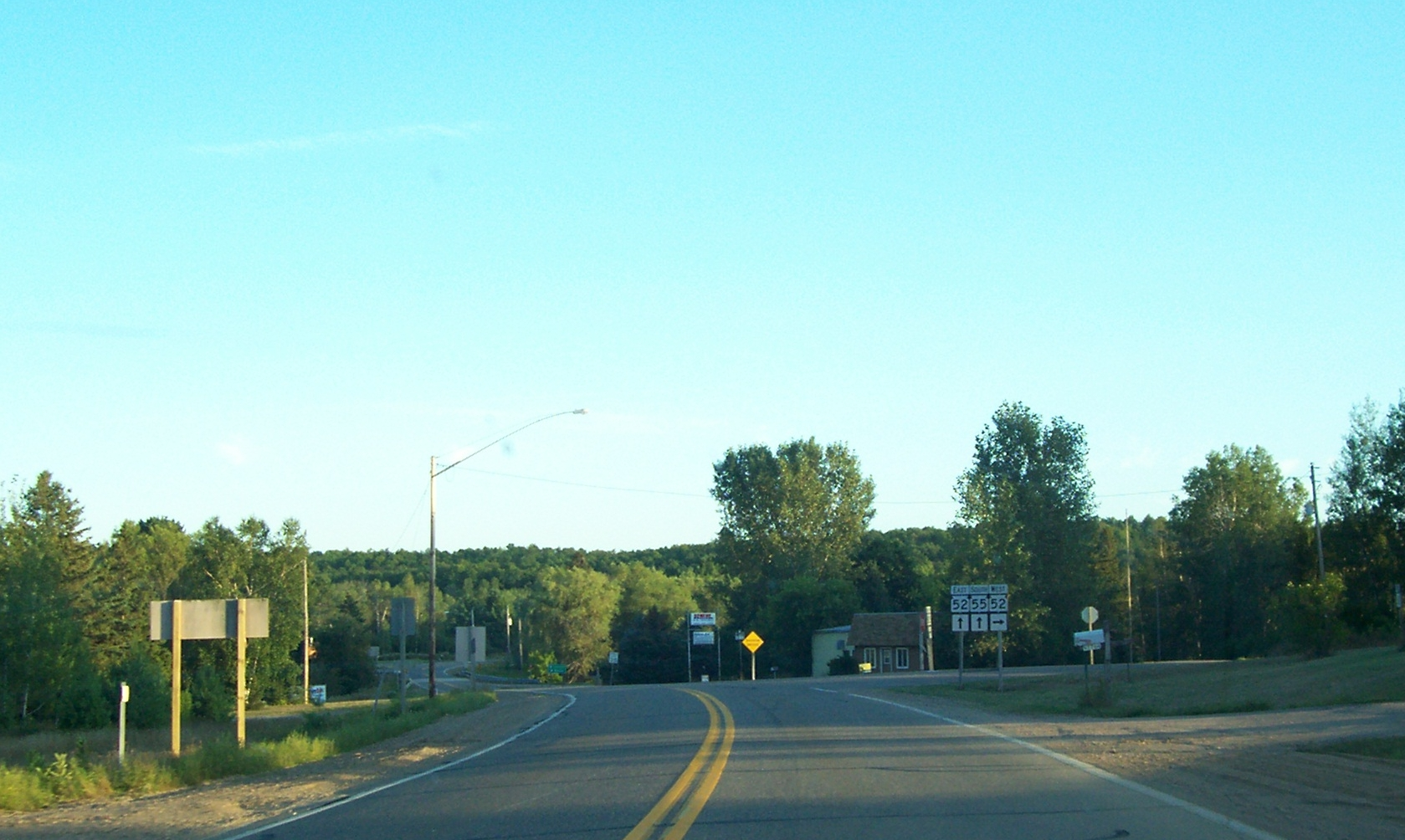
- Looking south at WIS 52 from WIS 55

- Location within Wisconsin Location within the United States
- Coordinates: 45.307°N 88.854°W
- Country: United States
- State: Wisconsin
- County: Langlade
- Town: Langlade
- Elevation: 1,440 ft (440 m)
- Time zone: UTC-6 (Central (CST))
  - Summer (DST): UTC-5 (CDT)
- ZIP code: 54491
- Area codes: 715 & 534
- GNIS feature ID: 1579653

Lily is an unincorporated community in Langlade County, Wisconsin, United States, located within the town of Langlade. Lily is at the intersection of state highways 52 and 55.

The Town of Langlade Town Hall, and the Town of Langlade Fire & Rescue Department are located in Lily.

The Wisconsin Central Ltd Railroad (formerly Soo Line) operated a rail line through Lily until 2001, when the tracks were removed. The railroad grade is now the Wolf River State Trail.

Lily is also a junction for many area snowmobile and ATV trails. The Lily Sno-Birds Clubhouse is located on Turtle Lake Road, and there is also a small racetrack located there where snowmobiles and ATVs have raced in the past. The track is currently dormant. The town of Lily established a post office in 1882 until it was discontinued in 1891.

== Images ==
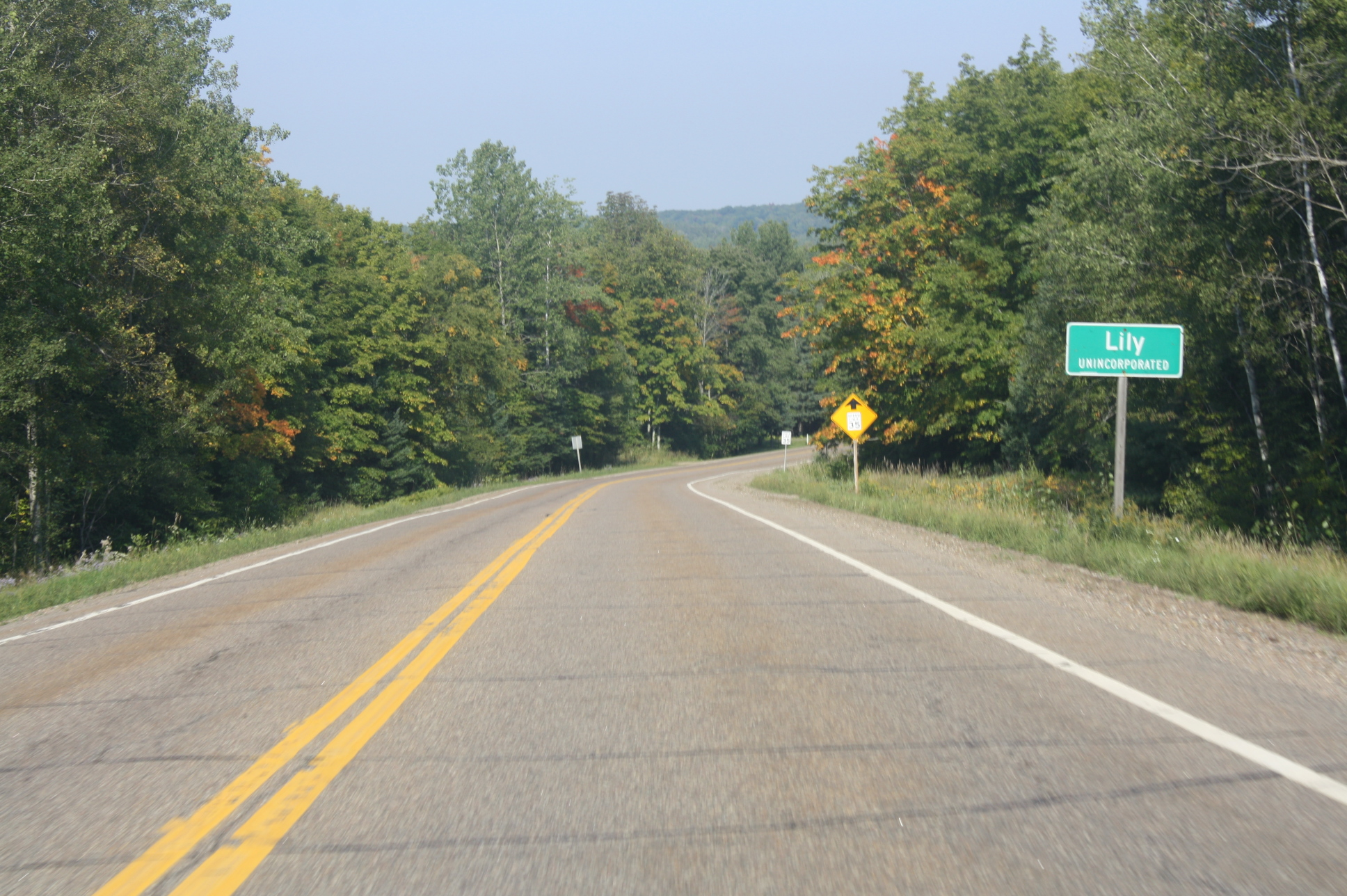
Looking north at the sign for Lily

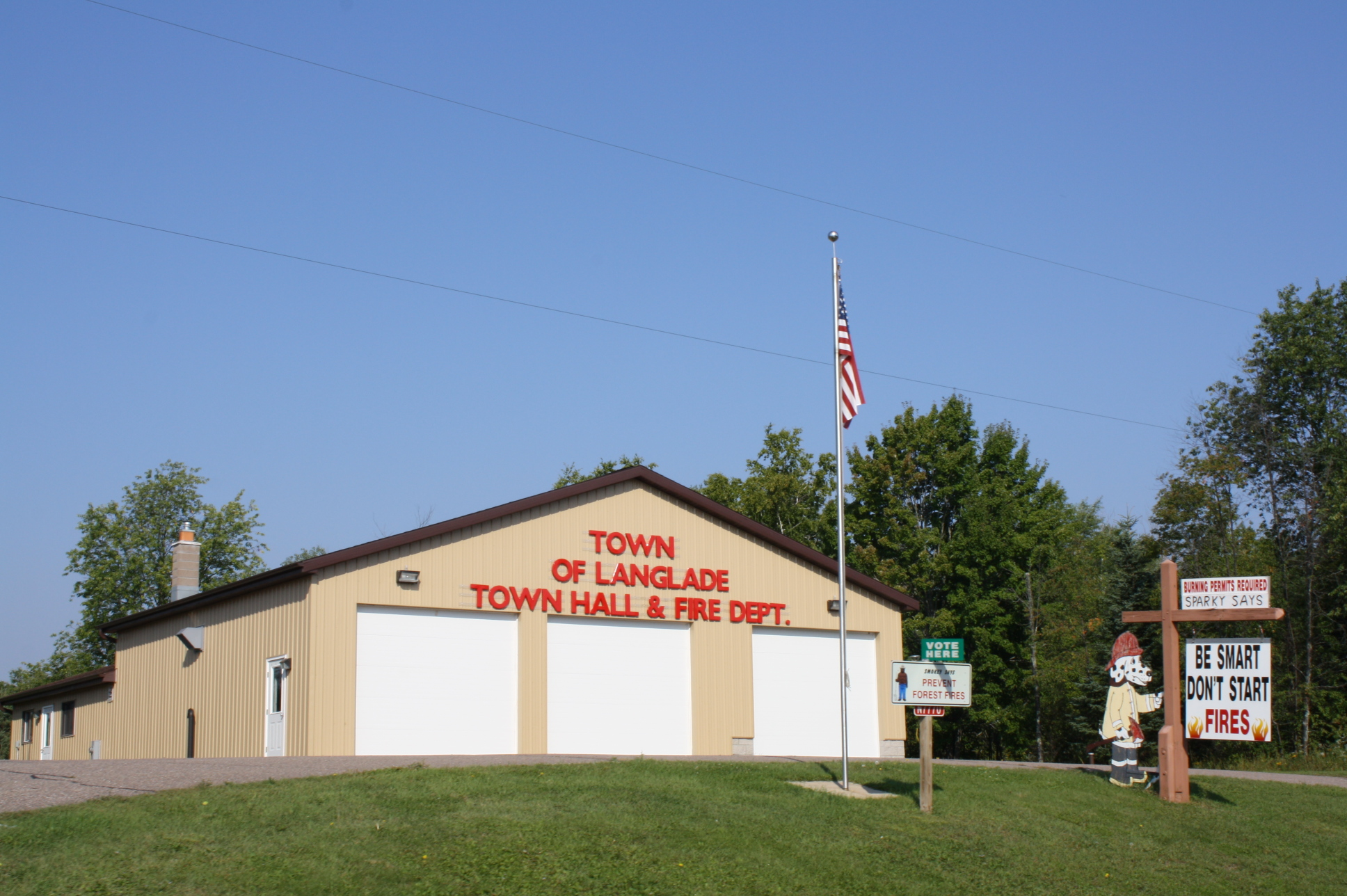
Town of Langlade town hall and fire station
