= M-73 (Michigan highway) =

State highway in Iron County, Michigan, United States

M-73
- M-73 highlighted in red

Route information
- Maintained by MDOT
- Length: 8.171 mi (13.150 km)
- Existed: c. July 1, 1919–present

Major junctions
- South end: WIS 55 near Iron River
- North end: US 2 in Iron River

Location
- Country: United States
- State: Michigan
- Counties: Iron

Highway system
- Michigan State Trunkline Highway System; Interstate; US; State; Byways
← M-72	→ M-74

M-73 is a north–south state trunkline highway in the Upper Peninsula of the US state of Michigan. It connects with US Highway 2 (US 2) and Highway 55 (WIS 55) at the state line near Iron River. Running through forest, the highway was first designated along with the rest of the state highway system in 1919. Unchanged since its inception, M-73 was completely paved by the mid-1930s.

== Route description ==
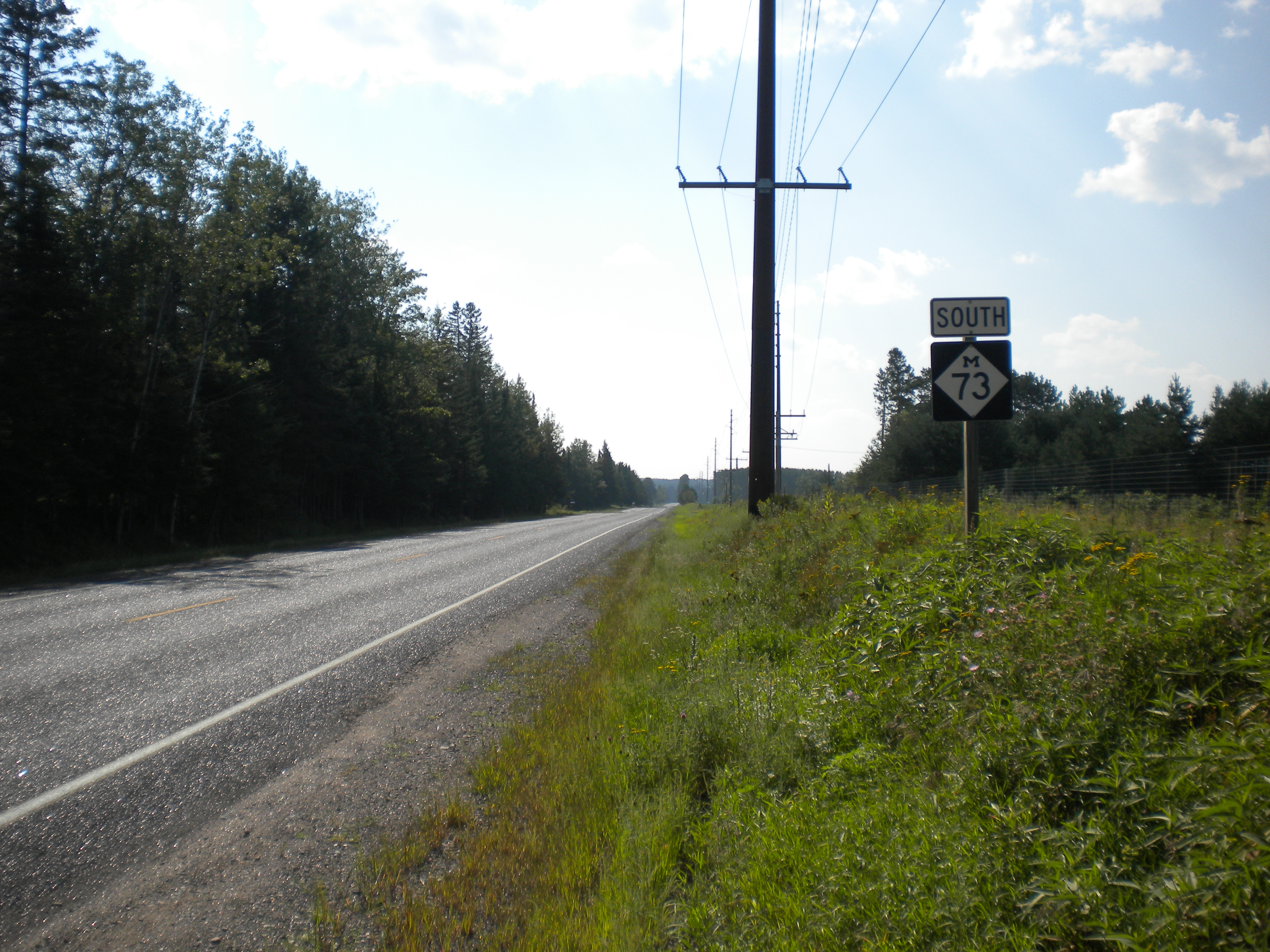
M-73 in rural Iron County

M-73 starts on its southwestern end on a bridge over the Brule River that connects across the state line to WIS 55 in Forest County, Wisconsin. On the Michigan side of the border, the highway runs north away from the river. It runs along the western edge of a section of farm fields for a half mile before turning eastward with a sharp 90-degree bend to run through them, passing Ahlberg Road. M-73 passes to the south of Hagerman, Little Hagerman, and Bass lakes, after which it turns northeasterly running north of Stanley Lake. The northern terminus is at US 2 west of downtown Iron River. All of M-73 is two-lane rural highway through wooded terrain except the section immediately north of the state line which runs along the aforementioned farm.

No part of M-73 is listed on the National Highway System. In 2009, the Michigan Department of Transportation conducted a survey to determine the traffic volume along the highway, reported using a metric called average annual daily traffic. The department determined that 890 vehicles a day used the southern half of the highway while 1,100 vehicles used the northern section closest to US 2. In the same surveys, MDOT calculated that, on average, 30 trucks used the roadway daily.

== History ==
M-73 was designated by July 1, 1919, along with the rest of the initial state trunkline highway system. In 1937, the highway was completely hard-surfaced for the first time. Its routing has been largely unchanged since designation. The original bridge over the Brule River was built in 1922. In a joint project with the Wisconsin Department of Transportation (WisDOT), MDOT funded a replacement in 2003. WisDOT supervised construction of the new span in a project that ran between July 14 and November 4, 2003.

== Major intersections ==
The entire highway is in Iron County.

Location	mi	km	Destinations	Notes
Stambaugh Township	0.000	0.000	WIS 55 south	Wisconsin state line
Iron River Township	8.171	13.150	US 2 – Ironwood, Iron River, Crystal Falls	
1.000 mi = 1.609 km; 1.000 km = 0.621 mi
