= Langlade, Wisconsin =

- Town
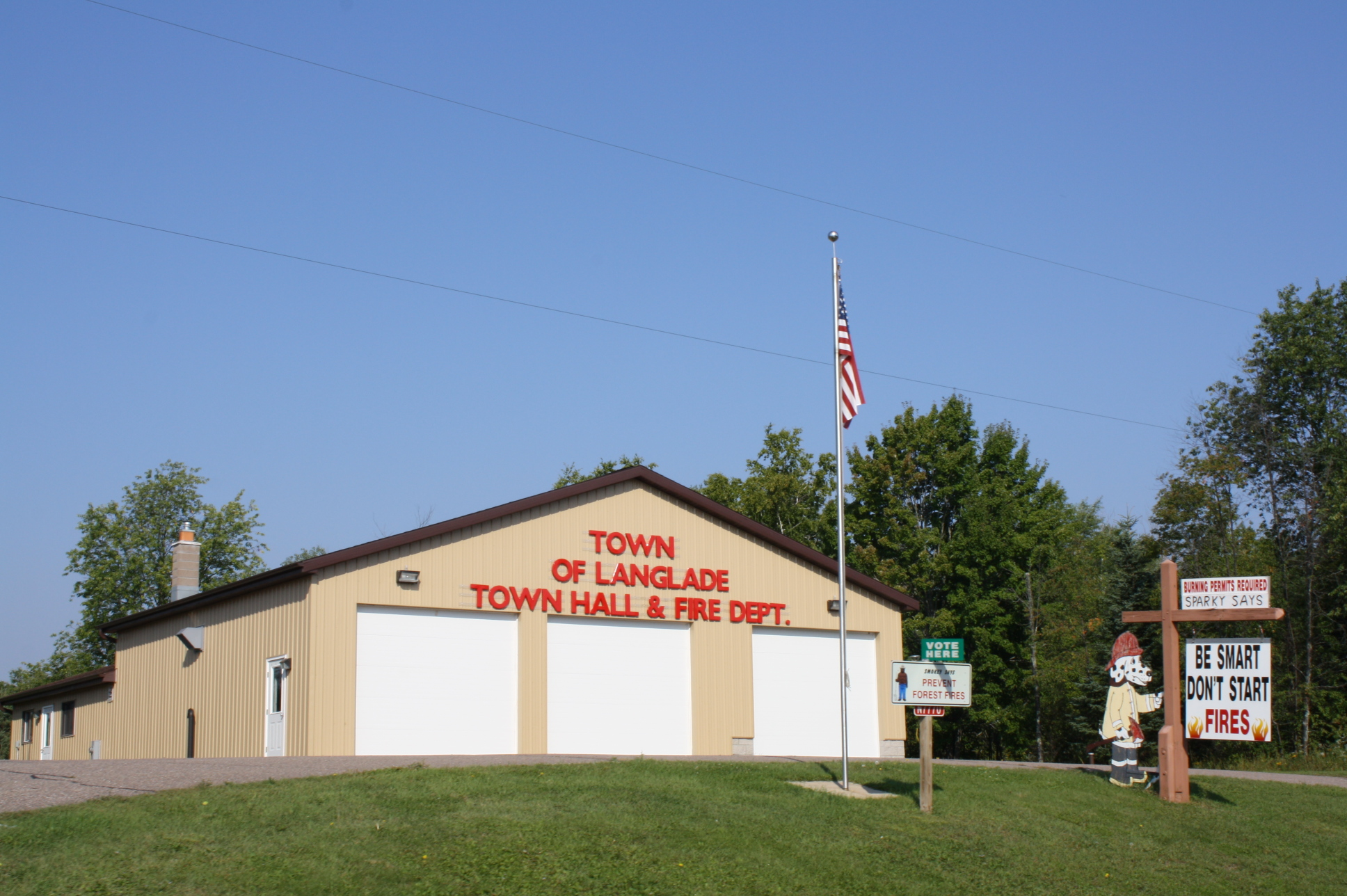
- Town of Langlade Town Hall and Fire Station, located in Lily

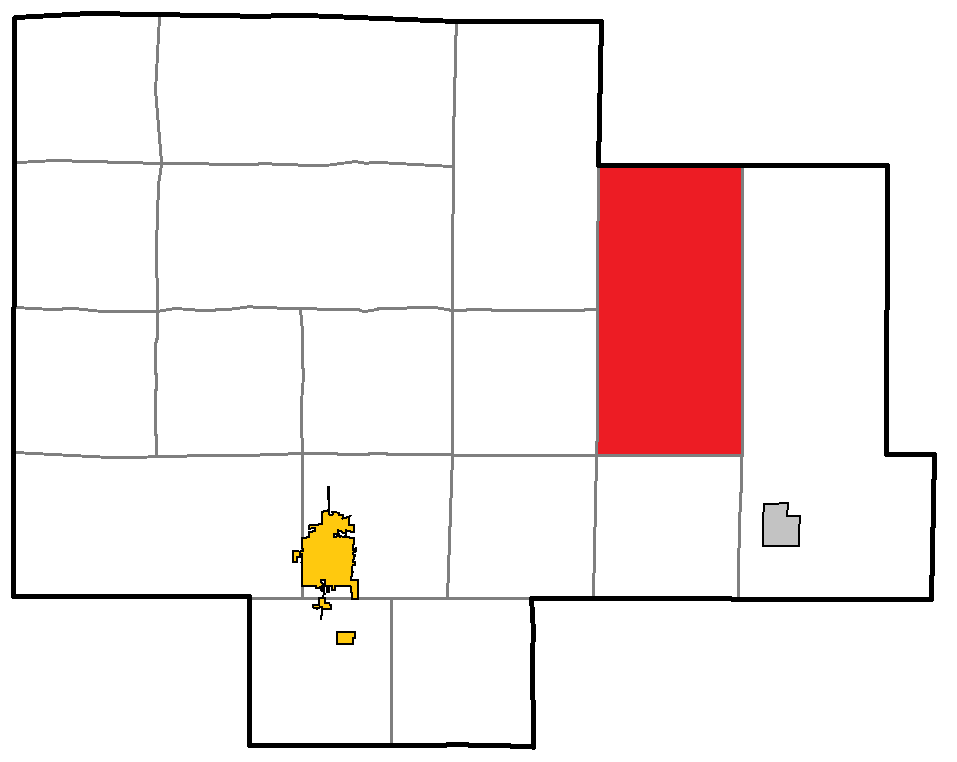
- Location of Langlade, within Langlade County
- Coordinates: 45°18′26″N 88°51′21″W
- Country: United States
- State: Wisconsin
- County: Langlade

Area
  - Total: 72.5 sq mi (187.8 km^{2})
  - Land: 71.5 sq mi (185.3 km^{2})
  - Water: 0.97 sq mi (2.5 km^{2})
- Elevation: 1,421 ft (433 m)

Population (2020)
  - Total: 469
  - Density: 6.56/sq mi (2.53/km^{2})
- Time zone: UTC-6 (Central (CST))
  - Summer (DST): UTC-5 (CDT)
- ZIP Code: 54418 (Bryant); 54491 (White Lake); 54465 (Pickerel)
- Area codes: 715 & 534
- FIPS code: 55-42425
- GNIS feature ID: 1583526

Langlade is a town in Langlade County, Wisconsin, United States. The population was 469 at the 2020 census. The unincorporated communities of Choate, Freeman, Lily, and Pickerel are located within the town.

The township is served by the Town of Langlade Fire Department, and Pickerel Rescue Squad for ambulance services.

== Geography ==
Langlade is in eastern Langlade County and is bordered to the north by Forest County. The community of Lily is close to the geographic center of the town, on the eastern side of the Wolf River, where it is joined from the northeast by the Lily River. State highways 52 and 55 cross in Lily, WI-52 leading northeast 17 miles (27 km) to Wabeno and southwest 21 miles (34 km) to Antigo, the Langlade county seat, while WI-55 leads north 24 miles (39 km) to Crandon and southeast 45 miles (72 km) to Shawano. The community of Pickerel, with its own post office, is in the northwestern corner of the town along WI-55, while Choate and Freeman are in the north along WI-52.

According to the United States Census Bureau, the town of Langlade has a total area of 72.5 square miles (187.8 km^{2}), of which 71.5 square miles (185.3 km^{2}) are land and 0.97 square miles (2.5 km^{2}), or 1.35%, are water. The Wolf River, part of the Fox River watershed leading to Green Bay on Lake Michigan, flows northwest to southeast across the town.

== Demographics ==
As of the census of 2000, there were 472 people, 208 households, and 147 families residing in the town. The population density was 6.6 people per square mile (2.5/km^{2}). There were 375 housing units at an average density of 5.2 per square mile (2/km^{2}). The racial makeup of the town was 98.73% White, 0.42% Native American, and 0.85% from two or more races.

There were 208 households, out of which 20.2% had children under the age of 18 living with them, 63.5% were married couples living together, 3.8% had a female householder with no husband present, and 29.3% were non-families. 23.1% of all households were made up of individuals, and 11.5% had someone living alone who was 65 years of age or older. The average household size was 2.27 and the average family size was 2.66.

In the town, the population was spread out, with 18.4% under the age of 18, 3.4% from 18 to 24, 25.4% from 25 to 44, 29.9% from 45 to 64, and 22.9% who were 65 years of age or older. The median age was 47 years. For every 100 females, there were 110.7 males. For every 100 females age 18 and over, there were 105.9 males.

The median income for a household in the town was $27,054, and the median income for a family was $30,909. Males had a median income of $26,607 versus $16,389 for females. The per capita income for the town was $14,418. About 13.5% of families and 13.8% of the population were below the poverty line, including 16% of those under age 18 and 11% of those age 65 or over.

== Culture ==
Langlade is mentioned in the song "Champagne in Sweatpants", on the album Separation Sunday by The Hold Steady, in reference to "gettin' langlazed."
