= Wisconsin Highway 114 =

State highway in Wisconsin, United States

State Trunk Highway 114
- WI-114 highlighted in red

Route information
- Maintained by WisDOT
- Length: 21.03 mi (33.84 km)

Major junctions
- West end: I-41 / US 41 in Neenah
- US 10 in Menasha; US 10 in Sherwood
- East end: WIS 32 / WIS 57 in Hilbert

Location
- Country: United States
- State: Wisconsin
- Counties: Winnebago, Calumet

Highway system
- Wisconsin State Trunk Highway System; Interstate; US; State; Scenic; Rustic
← WIS 113	→ WIS 115

State Trunk Highway 114 (often called Highway 114, STH-114 or WIS 114) is a state highway in the U.S. state of Wisconsin. It runs east–west in east central Wisconsin from Neenah to Hilbert. The highway ran from Neenah to Brillion before about 1986, when the section from Hilbert to Brillion was turned back to Calumet County, which now maintains it as County Trunk Highway PP (CTH-PP).

== Route description ==
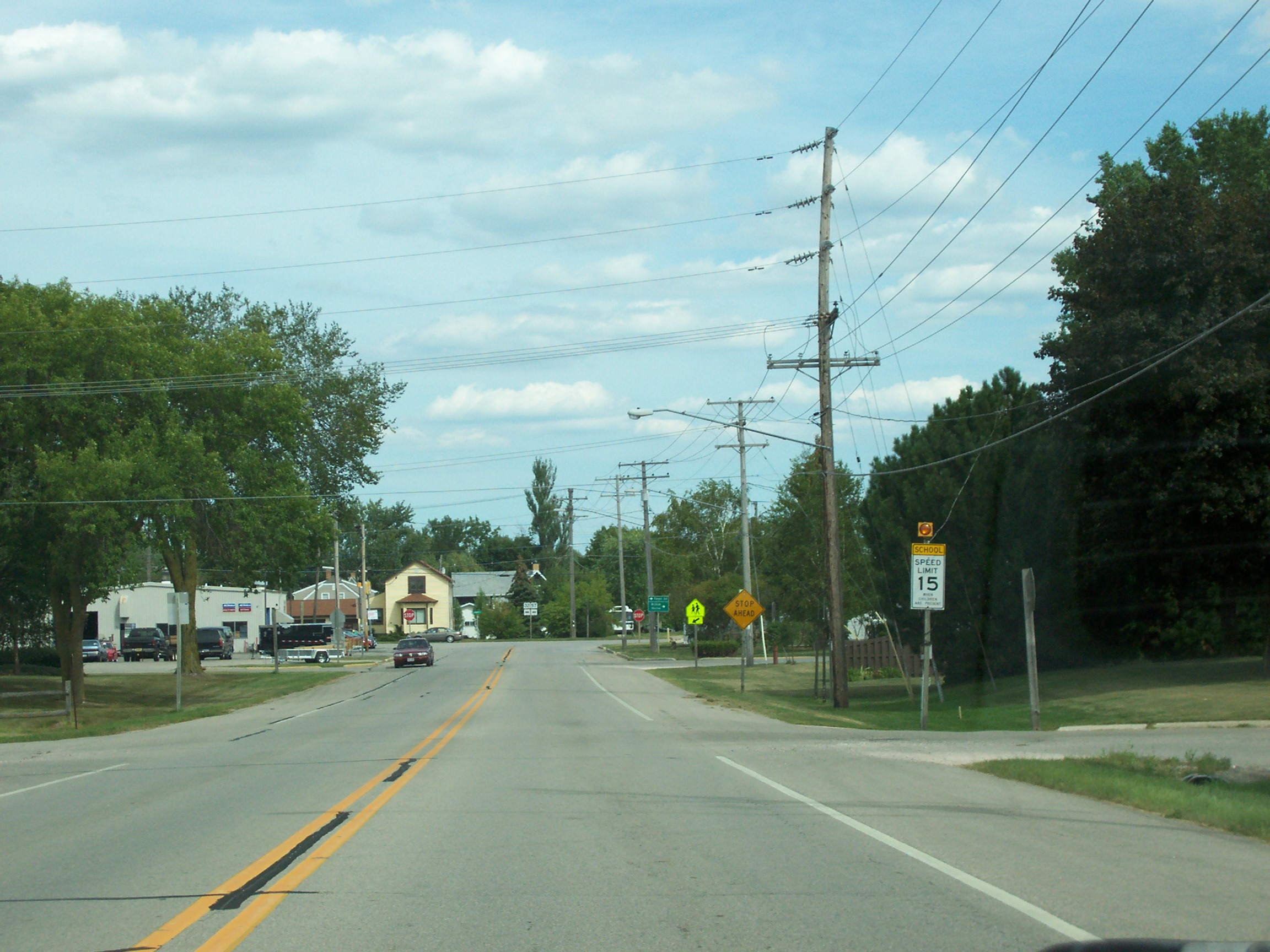
Current east terminus in Hilbert

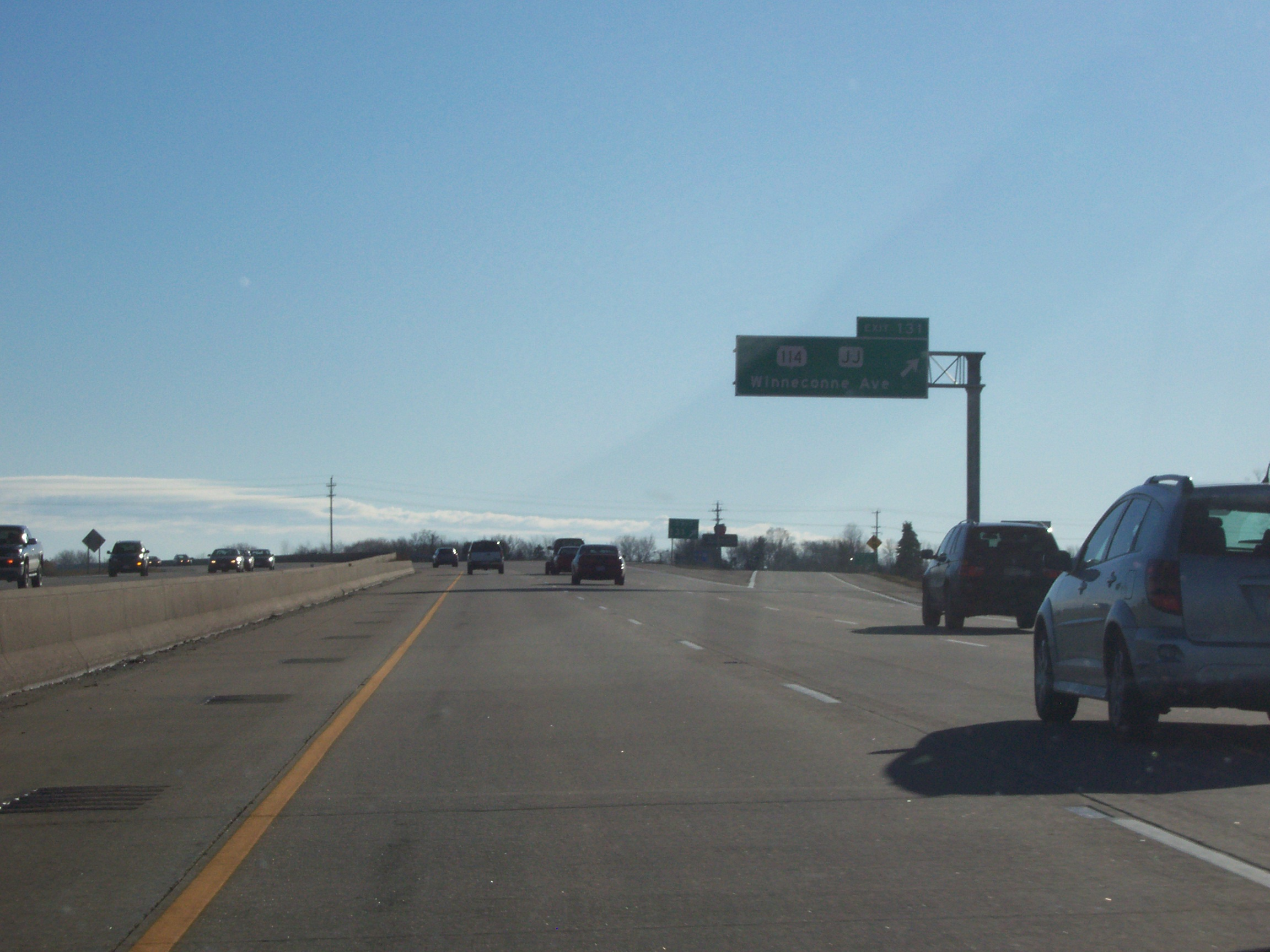
The western terminus while traveling southbound on I-41

Starting at Interstate 41/US Highway 41 (I-41/US 41) in Neenah, WIS 114 starts to travel eastward along Winneconne Avenue. As it reaches downtown, WIS 114 transitions north onto Commercial Street. As it enters Menasha, WIS 114 transitions onto Washington Avenue and then onto Tayco Street. It then turns east along Third Street, intersects WIS 47, and then northeast along Plank Road.

After the road bends east, WIS 114 then begins to run concurrently with US 10. After that, the road transitions from a five-lane undivided road to a four-lane divided road. Then, WIS 114 branches southeastward away from US 10. As it almost enters Sherwood, it then begins to run concurrently with WIS 55. Then, in the middle of Sherwood, they bend south-southwestward. As they are about to leave Sherwood, WIS 114 turns southward. After that, WIS 114 turns eastward towards Hilbert to intersect with WIS 32/WIS 57. At this intersection in Hilbert, WIS 114 ends.

== Major intersections ==
County	Location	mi	km	Destinations	Notes
Winnebago	Neenah			I-41 / US 41 – Appleton, Milwaukee	
Winnebago	Menasha			WIS 47 north – Appleton	
Winnebago–Calumet county line	Menasha			US 10 west – Appleton	Western end of US 10 concurrency
Calumet	Town of Harrison			US 10 east – Manitowoc	Eastern end of US 10 concurrency
Calumet	Sherwood			WIS 55 north – Kaukauna	Western end of WIS 55 concurrency
Calumet	Sherwood			WIS 55 – Stockbridge, Fond du Lac	Eastern end of WIS 55 concurrency
Calumet	Hilbert			WIS 32 / WIS 57 – Forest Junction, Chilton	
1.000 mi = 1.609 km; 1.000 km = 0.621 mi
