= Wisconsin Highway 55 =

State highway in Wisconsin, United States

State Trunk Highway 55
- WIS 55 highlighted in red

Route information
- Maintained by WisDOT
- Length: 175.55 mi (282.52 km)

Major junctions
- South end: US 151 in Brothertown
- US 10 in Sherwood; I-41 / US 41 in Kaukauna; US 8 / WIS 32 in Crandon
- North end: M-73 in Nelma

Location
- Country: United States
- State: Wisconsin
- Counties: Calumet, Outagamie, Shawano, Menominee, Langlade, Forest

Highway system
- Wisconsin State Trunk Highway System; Interstate; US; State; Scenic; Rustic
← WIS 54	→ WIS 56

State Trunk Highway 55 (often called Highway 55, STH-55, or WIS 55) is a state highway in Wisconsin, United States. It travels south-to-north in the northeastern part of Wisconsin from an intersection with U.S. Highway 151 (US 151) approximately 1.5 miles (2.4 km) north of Brothertown, near the eastern shore of Lake Winnebago in Calumet County, to the Michigan state line at the Brule River approximately one mile (1.6 km) northeast of Nelma in Forest County, where it connects to M-73.

== Route description ==
WIS 55 begins at an intersection with US 151 directly across Lake Winnebago from Oshkosh. Proceeding north, it passes through Stockbridge. Just south of Sherwood it merges with WIS 114 and the highway enters Sherwood and turns to go northwest. At a roundabout junction, WIS 55 leaves the concurrency with WIS 114 to go north. It crosses US 10 at another roundabout junction and enters Kaukauna on Lawe Street and crosses the Fox River. Past downtown it turns onto Delanglade Street. WIS 55 crosses Interstate 41 (I-41) and US 41 as it leaves Kaukauna and turns to go north, passing through Freedom. WIS 55 runs concurrently with WIS 54 for one mile before turning to go north, passing through Seymour. As the highway proceeds north, it crosses WIS 156.

WIS 55 joins the WIS 29 expressway and leaves the expressway before entering Shawano. There is a short concurrency with WIS 22. North of Shawano the highway enters the Menominee Indian Reservation. North of the reservation it crosses WIS 64 and proceeds north through the forest. WIS 55 runs concurrently with US 8 in Crandon. As it leaves Crandon it runs concurrently with WIS 32 until Argonne, where WIS 32 turns to go northwest toward Three Lakes. WIS 55 enters the Headwaters Wilderness.

In the forest, the highway crosses WIS 70 and goes through the town of Alvin and terminates at the Wisconsin-Michigan border on a bridge over the Brule River, where it continues as M-73.

== History ==
The original bridge over the Brule River was built in 1922. In a joint project with the Michigan Department of Transportation (MDOT), the Wisconsin Department of Transportation (WisDOT) funded a replacement in 2003. WisDOT supervised the construction of the new span in a project that ran between July 14 and November 4, 2003.

A new roundabout was opened at the intersection of WIS 55 and US 10 between Sherwood and Kaukauna in the autumn of 2009. Another roundabout recently opened at the busy intersection of WIS 55 and WIS 114 approximately one mile (1.6 km) west of Sherwood, Wisconsin.

Over the summer of 2018, a one-mile (1.6 km) section of WIS 55 at its interchange with I-41 in Kaukauna was reconstructed and four new roundabouts were added.

In summer of 2023, the shoulder was widened in Alvin for bicycle access as part of a resurfacing project.

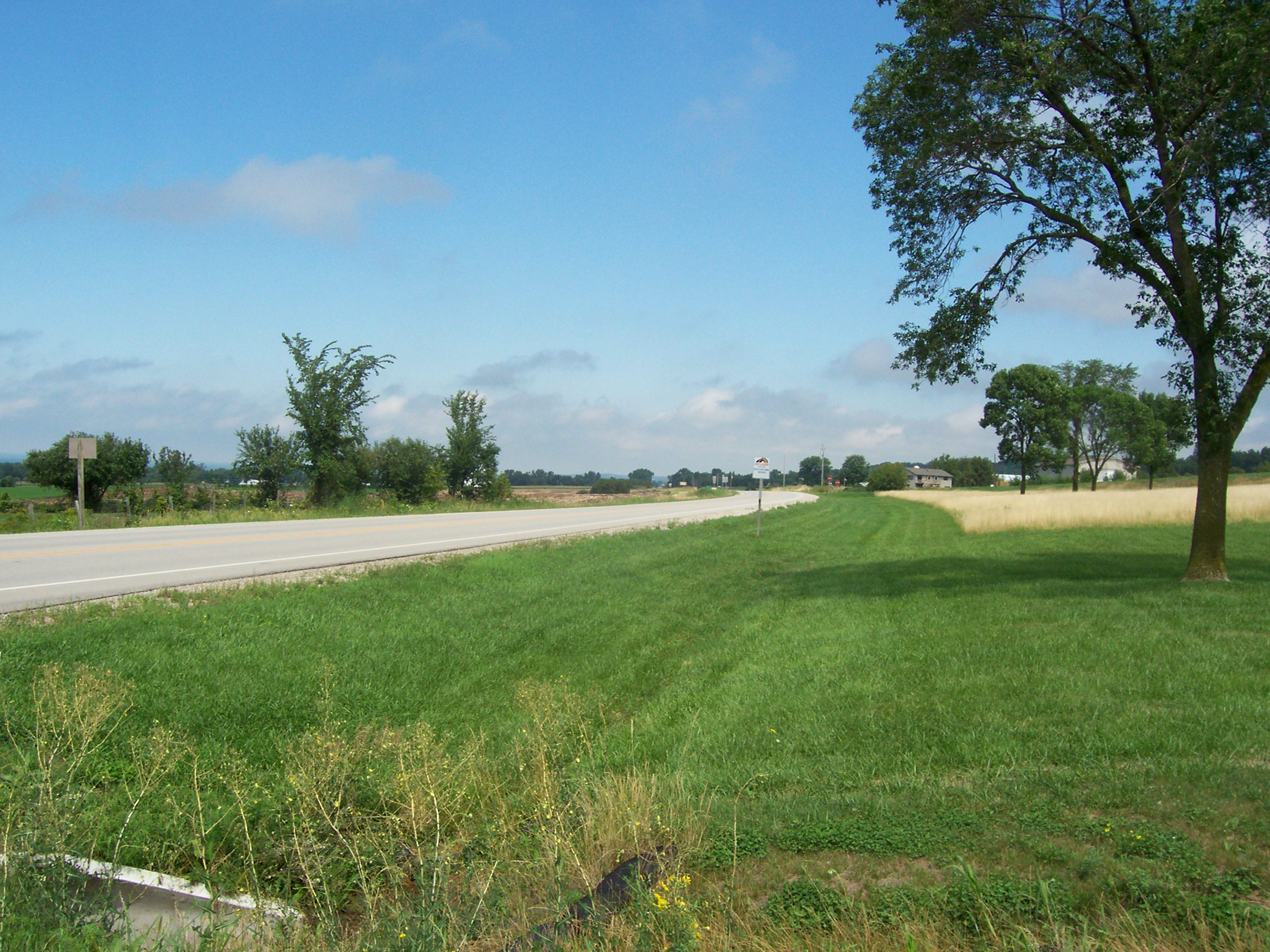
Southern terminus in the Town of Brothertown

== Major intersections ==
County	Location	mi	km	Destinations	Notes
Calumet	Town of Chilton	0.0	0.0	US 151 – Fond du Lac, Chilton, Manitowoc	Southern terminus
Calumet	Sherwood	11.9	19.2	WIS 114 east – Hilbert	Eastern end of WIS 114 concurrency
Calumet	Sherwood	14.4	23.2	WIS 114 west – Menasha, Neenah	Western end of WIS 114 concurrency
Calumet	Town of Harrison	15.9	25.6	US 10 – Appleton, Manitowoc	
Outagamie	Kaukauna	21.2	34.1	WIS 96 west – Appleton	Western end of WIS 96 concurrency
Outagamie	Kaukauna	21.6	34.8	WIS 96 east – Wrightstown	Eastern end of WIS 96 concurrency
Outagamie	Kaukauna	22.6	36.4	I-41 / US 41 – Milwaukee, Green Bay	
Outagamie	Oneida	36.8	59.2	WIS 54 east – Green Bay	Eastern end of WIS 54 concurrency
Outagamie	City of Seymour	38.8	62.4	WIS 54 west – Black Creek, New London	Western end of WIS 54 concurrency
Shawano	Rose Lawn	45.8	73.7	WIS 156 – Clintonville, Green Bay	
Shawano	Angelica	51.1	82.2	WIS 29 east / WIS 160 east – Pulaski, Green Bay	Eastern end of WIS 29 concurrency
Shawano	Bonduel	59.2	95.3	WIS 47 south / WIS 117 north – Black Creek, Appleton, Bonduel, Cecil	Southern end of WIS 47 concurrency
Shawano	Shawano	65.9	106.1	WIS 29 west – Wausau	Western end of WIS 29 concurrency
Shawano	Shawano	67.7	109.0	WIS 22 north – Cecil, Oconto	Northern end of WIS 22 concurrency
Shawano	Shawano	69.7	112.2	WIS 22 south – Clintonville	Southern end of WIS 22 concurrency
Menominee	Keshena	78.1	125.7	WIS 47 north – Neopit, Antigo	Northern end of WIS 47 concurrency
Langlade	Langlade	103.3	166.2	WIS 64 – Antigo, Mountain	
Langlade	Lily	114.8	184.8	WIS 52 east – Wabeno	Eastern end of WIS 52 concurrency
Langlade	Lily	114.9	184.9	WIS 52 west – Antigo	Western end of WIS 52 concurrency
Forest	Crandon	139.0	223.7	US 8 east / WIS 32 south – Laona, Norway	Southern end of US 8/WIS 32 concurrency
Forest	Crandon	139.5	224.5	US 8 west – Rhinelander	Northern end of US 8 concurrency
Forest	Argonne	146.1	235.1	WIS 32 north – Three Lakes	Northern end of WIS 32 concurrency
Forest	Town of Alvin	169.4	272.6	WIS 70 – Eagle River, Florence	
Forest	Town of Alvin	175.55	282.52	M-73 north – Iron River	Continuation into Michigan
1.000 mi = 1.609 km; 1.000 km = 0.621 mi: Concurrency terminus
