= Aniwa, Wisconsin =

- Village
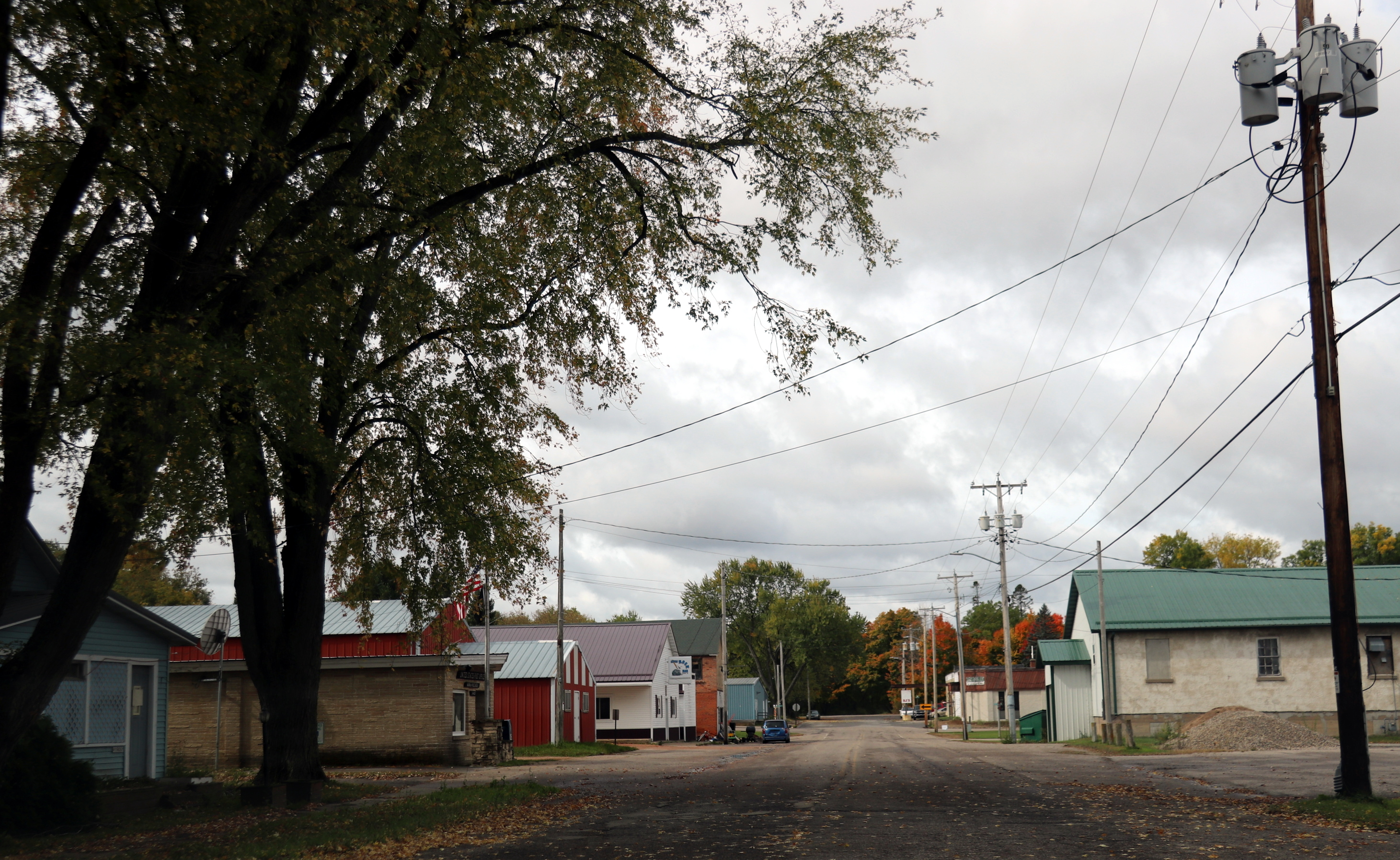
- Downtown Aniwa

- Location of Aniwa in Shawano County, Wisconsin.
- Coordinates: 44°59′2″N 89°8′59″W
- Country: United States
- State: Wisconsin
- County: Shawano

Area
  - Total: 2.16 sq mi (5.60 km^{2})
  - Land: 2.12 sq mi (5.50 km^{2})
  - Water: 0.039 sq mi (0.10 km^{2})
- Elevation: 1,348 ft (411 m)

Population (2020)
  - Total: 243
  - Density: 114/sq mi (44.2/km^{2})
- Time zone: UTC-6 (Central (CST))
  - Summer (DST): UTC-5 (CDT)
- FIPS code: 55-02100
- GNIS feature ID: 1582697

Aniwa is a village in Shawano County, Wisconsin, United States. The population was 243 at the 2020 census. The village is located within the Town of Aniwa. U.S. Route 45 runs north–south through the village.

== Name origin ==
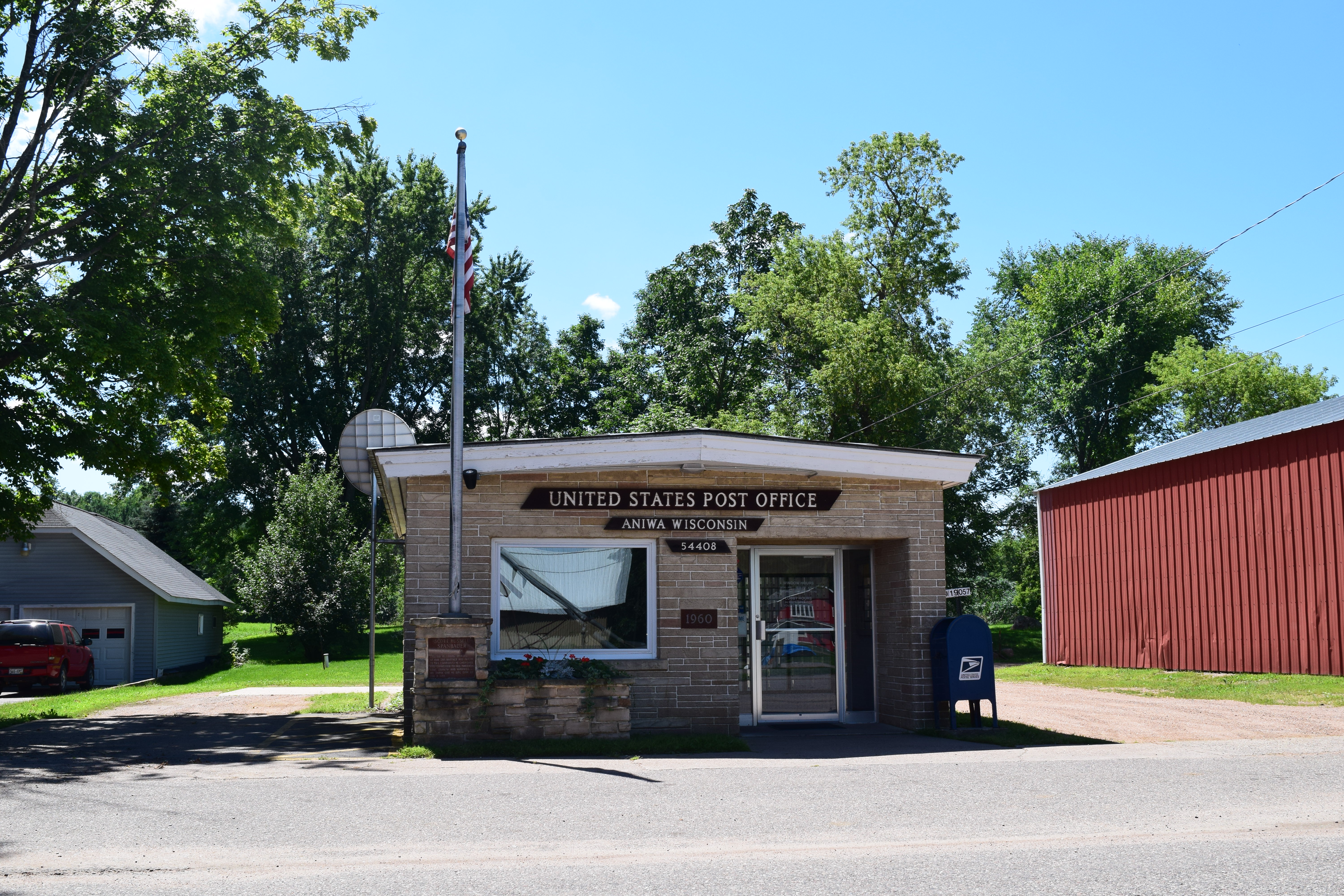
Post office

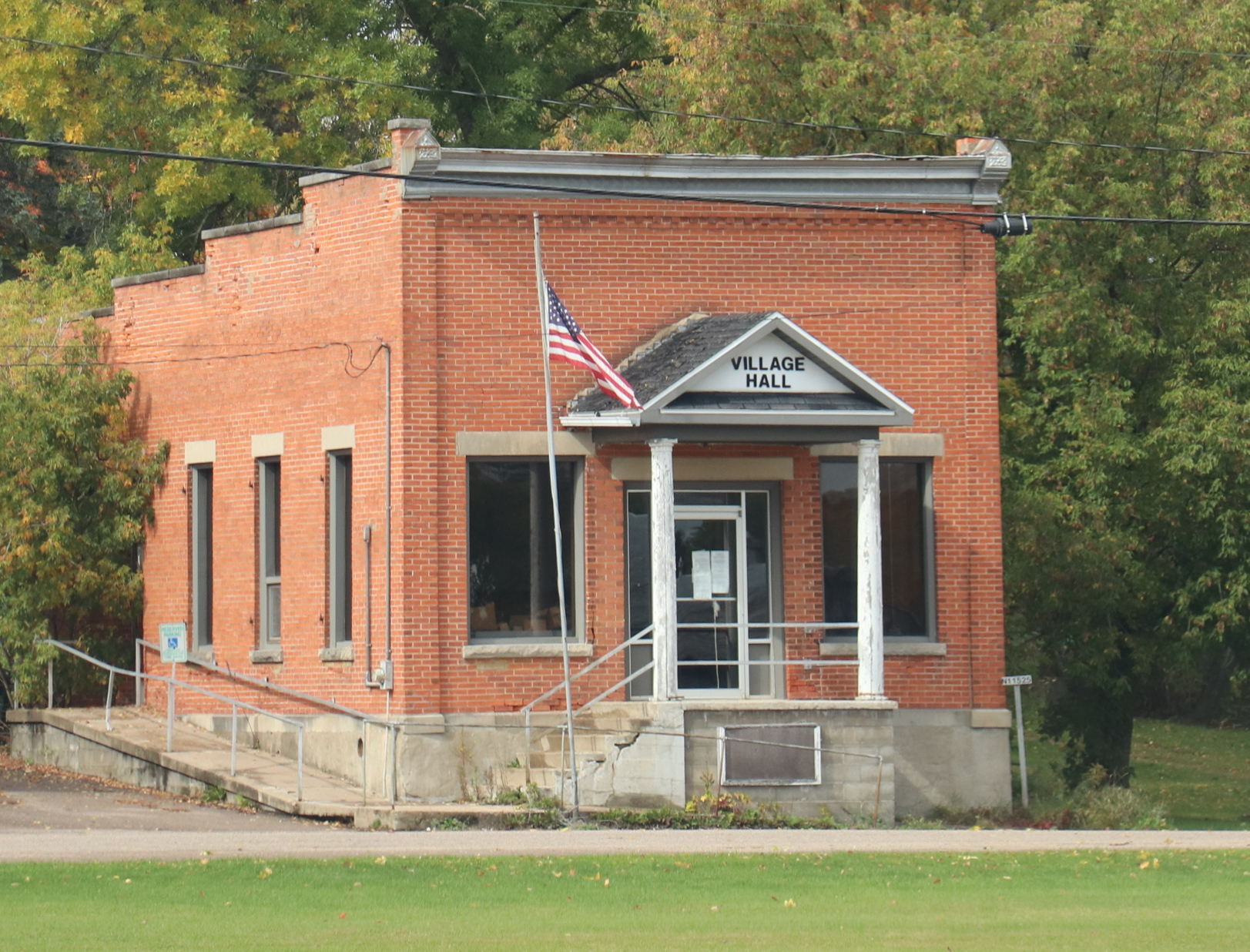
Village hall

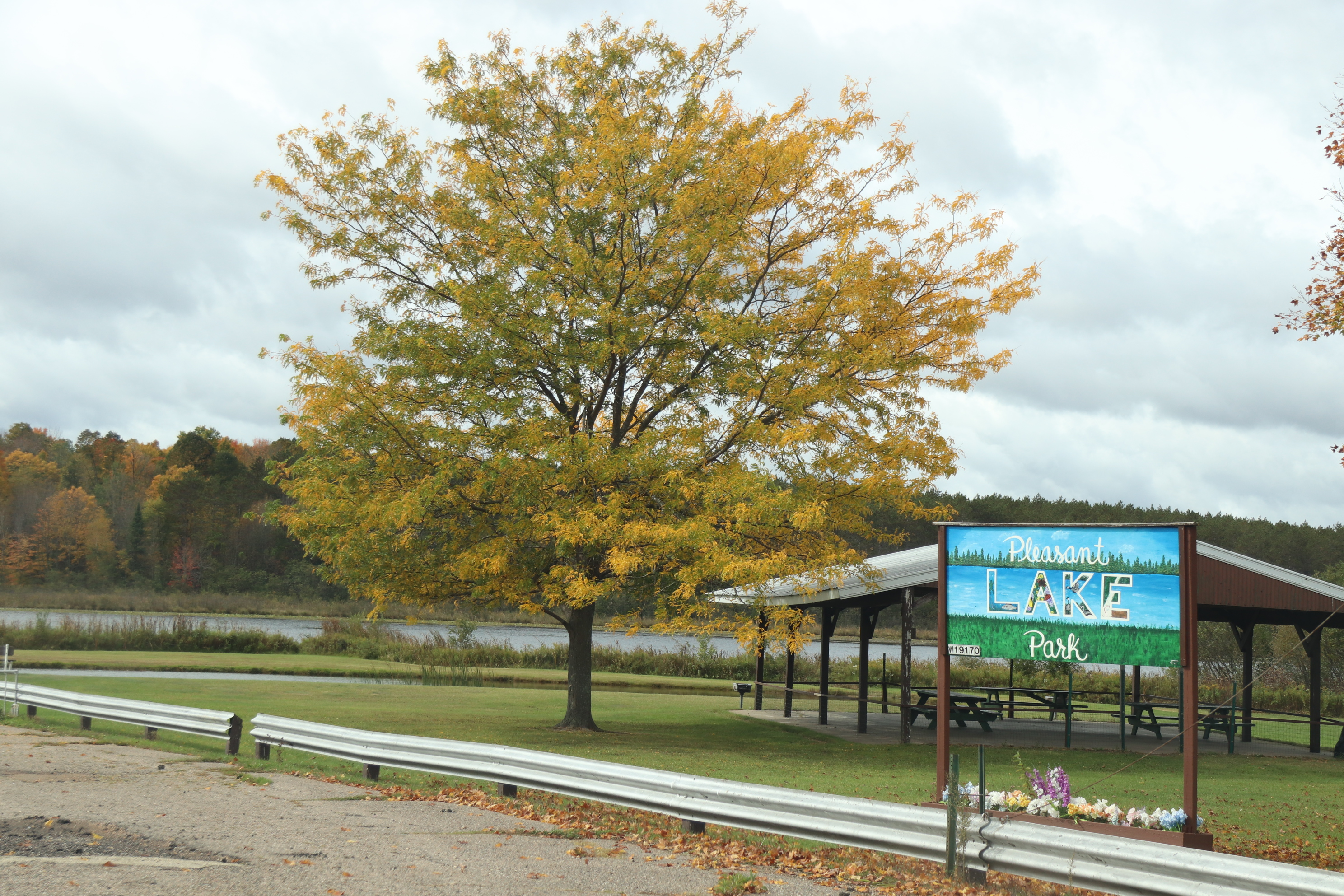
Pleasant Lake Park

The name Aniwa is of Ojibwe origin. It is derived from aniwi, aniwa "those".

== Geography ==
Aniwa is located at 45°0′36″N 89°12′45″W (45.010062, -89.212767).

According to the United States Census Bureau, the village has a total area of 2.13 square miles (5.52 km^{2}), of which 2.09 square miles (5.41 km^{2}) is land and 0.04 square miles (0.10 km^{2}) is water.

== Demographics ==
Historical population
Census	Pop.	Note	%±
1900	367		—
1910	274		−25.3%
1920	250		−8.8%
1930	296		18.4%
1940	283		−4.4%
1950	257		−9.2%
1960	247		−3.9%
1970	233		−5.7%
1980	273		17.2%
1990	249		−8.8%
2000	272		9.2%
2010	260		−4.4%
2020	243		−6.5%
U.S. Decennial Census

=== 2010 census ===
As of the census of 2010, there were 260 people, 111 households, and 71 families living in the village. The population density was 124.4 inhabitants per square mile (48.0/km^{2}). There were 126 housing units at an average density of 60.3 per square mile (23.3/km^{2}). The racial makeup of the village was 99.2% White and 0.8% from two or more races. Hispanic or Latino of any race were 0.8% of the population.

There were 111 households, of which 32.4% had children under the age of 18 living with them, 47.7% were married couples living together, 11.7% had a female householder with no husband present, 4.5% had a male householder with no wife present, and 36.0% were non-families. 29.7% of all households were made up of individuals, and 8.1% had someone living alone who was 65 years of age or older. The average household size was 2.34 and the average family size was 2.92.

The median age in the village was 40.3 years. 25.4% of residents were under the age of 18; 3.8% were between the ages of 18 and 24; 30.4% were from 25 to 44; 22.3% were from 45 to 64; and 18.1% were 65 years of age or older. The gender makeup of the village was 50.0% male and 50.0% female.

=== 2000 census ===
As of the census of 2000, there were 272 people, 114 households, and 79 families living in the village. The population density was 130.2 people per square mile (50.2/km^{2}). There were 127 housing units at an average density of 60.8 per square mile (23.5/km^{2}). The racial makeup of the village was 97.06% White, 0.37% Native American, and 2.57% from two or more races. 1.10% of the population were Hispanic or Latino of any race.

There were 114 households, out of which 24.6% had children under the age of 18 living with them, 55.3% were married couples living together, 7.0% had a female householder with no husband present, and 30.7% were non-families. 23.7% of all households were made up of individuals, and 8.8% had someone living alone who was 65 years of age or older. The average household size was 2.39 and the average family size was 2.80.

In the village, the population was spread out, with 22.8% under the age of 18, 9.9% from 18 to 24, 30.1% from 25 to 44, 20.6% from 45 to 64, and 16.5% who were 65 years of age or older. The median age was 36 years. For every 100 females, there were 110.9 males. For every 100 females age 18 and over, there were 118.8 males.

The median income for a household in the village was $28,542, and the median income for a family was $30,833. Males had a median income of $26,094 versus $21,875 for females. The per capita income for the village was $13,203. About 7.5% of families and 15.6% of the population were below the poverty line, including 25.5% of those under the age of eighteen and 17.1% of those 65 or over.
