= Alvin, Wisconsin =

- Town
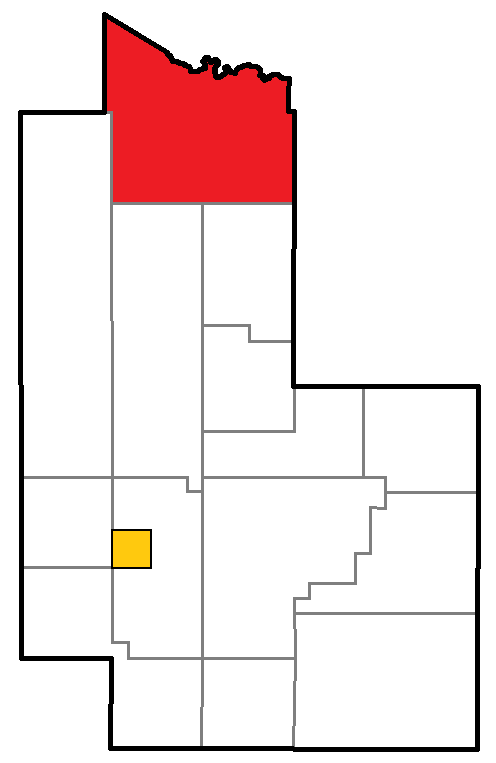
- Location of Alvin, within Forest County
- Coordinates: 45°57′53″N 88°49′19″W
- Country: United States
- State: Wisconsin
- County: Forest

Area
  - Total: 116.0 sq mi (300.4 km^{2})
  - Land: 115.0 sq mi (297.8 km^{2})
  - Water: 1.0 sq mi (2.6 km^{2})
- Elevation: 1,703 ft (519 m)

Population (2020)
  - Total: 173
  - Density: 1.50/sq mi (0.581/km^{2})
- Time zone: UTC-6 (Central (CST))
  - Summer (DST): UTC-5 (CDT)
- Area codes: 715 & 534
- FIPS code: 55-01625
- GNIS feature ID: 1582686

Alvin is a town in Forest County, Wisconsin, United States. The population was 173 at the 2020 census. The town was named after Alvin Spencer, a Baptist minister from Powell County, Kentucky who arrived in the area around 1908. The unincorporated communities of Alvin and Nelma are located in the town. Wisconsin Highway 55 goes through Alvin and Nelma.

== Geography ==
According to the United States Census Bureau, the town has a total area of 116.0 square miles (300 km^{2}), of which 115.0 square miles (298 km^{2}) is land and 1.0 square mile (2.6 km^{2}), or 0.87%, is water.

== Demographics ==
As of the census of 2000, there were 186 people, 96 households, and 62 families residing in the town. The population density was 1.6 people per square mile (0.6/km^{2}). There were 411 housing units at an average density of 3.6 per square mile (1.4/km^{2}). The racial makeup of the town was 98.39% White, and 1.61% from two or more races.

There were 96 households, out of which 12.5% had children under the age of 18 living with them, 56.3% were married couples living together, 3.1% had a female householder with no husband present, and 34.4% were non-families. 30.2% of all households were made up of individuals, and 17.7% had someone living alone who was 65 years of age or older. The average household size was 1.94 and the average family size was 2.37.

In the town, the population was spread out, with 10.8% under the age of 18, 3.2% from 18 to 24, 18.8% from 25 to 44, 32.8% from 45 to 64, and 34.4% who were 65 years of age or older. The median age was 58 years. For every 100 females, there were 104.4 males. For every 100 females age 18 and over, there were 110.1 males.

The median income for a household in the town was $26,500, and the median income for a family was $29,375. Males had a median income of $27,188 versus $30,208 for females. The per capita income for the town was $15,643. About 12.1% of families and 13.9% of the population were below the poverty line, including none of those under the age of eighteen and 9.5% of those sixty five or over.
